= Green Party of Manitoba candidates in the 2003 Manitoba provincial election =

The Green Party of Manitoba (GPM) fielded fourteen candidates in the 2003 provincial election, none of whom were elected. Information about these candidates may be found on this page. The party received a total of 3,792 votes.

The GPM also fielded a candidate in a 2005 by-election. Information about that candidate has been included on this page.

== Jesse Tottle (Assiniboia) ==
Tottle worked in West Kildonan at the time of the election. He received 102 votes (1.25%), finishing fourth against New Democratic Party incumbent Jim Rondeau.

== Catharine Johannson (Burrows) ==
Johannson has an Economics degree from the University of Manitoba. She wrote several plays during the 1990s, including "Dogs on Prozac", "Free Radical", "Redneck Misunderstood" and "How to Love a Self-Hating Ukrainian".

Johannson comes from a politically active family. Her father, Robert Johannson, was a member of Winnipeg city council from 1971 to 1977, and later campaigned for the provincial New Democratic Party. She herself was a member of the Manitoba Young New Democrats in the 1990s, and became President of the New Democratic Youth of Canada, the NDP's national youth wing, in 1997. She campaigned for a seat on the Winnipeg City Council in 1992, but was unsuccessful. She later left the NDP to join the Green Party. Her mother Joan Johannson and brother Mike Johannson have also been Green Party candidates.

Johannson has served on the federal council of the Green Party of Canada, and supported Elizabeth May for the leadership of the Green Party of Canada in 2006. She was also a member of the Green Party of Manitoba executive in the early 2000s.

Electoral record
| Election | Division | Party | Votes | % | Place | Winner |
|---|---|---|---|---|---|---|
| 1992 Winnipeg municipal | Councillor, Daniel McIntyre ward | n/a | 2,127 | 21.38 | 3/4 | Amaro Silva |
| 2003 provincial | Burrows | Green | 123 | 2.12 | 4/4 | Doug Martindale, New Democratic Party |
| 2008 Federal | Winnipeg North | Green | 1,077 | 4.78 | 4/6 | Judy Wasylycia-Leis, New Democratic Party |

== Larry Powell (Dauphin—Roblin) ==
Powell is an organic food producer and community activist in Roblin. He was a vocal opponent of plans to construct large hog farms in the Roblin area in 2000, arguing that they were environmentally unsafe and had been approved without due process. In 2001, as chair of Citizens Against Factory Farming (CAFF), he argued that European hog producers were deliberately setting up business in Canada to take advantage of less restrictive environmental regulations.

He received 216 votes (2.55%) in the 2003 election, finishing fourth against New Democratic Party incumbent Stan Struthers.

== Mikel Magnusson (Fort Rouge) ==
Magnusson was born in Digby, Nova Scotia, and has worked as a personal care attendant in Winnipeg. He has campaigned for the Green Party at the provincial and federal levels. He endorsed mandatory labels for genetically modified food in 1999 and 2000, and opposed what he described as overdevelopment strategies. A 2003 newspaper report describes him as a friend of Markus Buchart, who led the Manitoba Green Party from 1998 to 2005.

Magnusson has criticized tendencies toward postmodernism and moral relativism, and has written against Noam Chomsky and Marxism.

Electoral record
| Election | Division | Party | Votes | % | Place | Winner |
|---|---|---|---|---|---|---|
| 2000 federal | Winnipeg Centre | Green | 698 | 2.56 | 5/6 | Pat Martin, New Democratic Party |
| 2003 provincial | Fort Rouge | Green | 355 | 4.97 | 4/5 | Tim Sale, New Democratic Party |

== Mario Ducusin (Inkster) ==
Ducusin was born in the Philippines, and moved to Canada in 1976. He was a candidate for city council in the 1995 municipal election, seeking election in the Old Kildonan ward. A newspaper article from this campaign describes him as forty-five years old, with no party affiliation. He called for a crackdown on youth crime, supported measures to strengthen the family unit, and strongly opposed government-owned casinos.

Electoral record
| Election | Division | Party | Votes | % | Place | Winner |
|---|---|---|---|---|---|---|
| 1995 Winnipeg municipal | Councillor, Old Kildonan ward | n/a | 551 | 3.74 | 3/5 | Mike O'Shaughnessy |
| 2003 provincial | Inkster | Green | 103 | 1.50 | 4/4 | Kevin Lamoureux, Liberal |

== Frank Luschak (Kildonan) ==
Luschak is an elementary school teacher in Winnipeg. In 1998, he argued that a local Hepatitis B immunization plan should be postponed, on the grounds that the shots could result in immune deficiency difficulties. He also cautioned parents about a meningitis vaccine in 2001. Luschak's own daughter once fell into a seven-day coma after receiving a different immunization shot. He received 140 votes (1.92%) in 2003, finishing fourth against New Democratic Party incumbent Dave Chomiak.

== Vere H. Scott (Lord Roberts) ==
Scott received 442 votes (6.30%), finishing fourth against New Democratic Party incumbent Diane McGifford. He ran for the Green Party of Canada in the 2006 federal election.

== Joan Johannson (Minto) ==
Johannson is former New Democrat, and was a candidate of the New Democratic Party in the 1981 and 1990 provincial elections. She later left the NDP to join the Green Party. Her husband, Robert Johannson, is a former Winnipeg City Councillor, and her children Catharine and Mike have campaigned for the Green Party at the provincial and federal levels.

Johannson has a Master's Degree in social work, and was a social worker in Winnipeg for many years. She became unemployed during the economic downturn of the early 1990s, and subsequently became a prominent anti-poverty activist in the city. Johannson led the Canadian Association of the Non-Employed (CANE) from 1993 to 2000, and was a director of the National Anti-Poverty Association. She wrote her autobiography, "Discovering the Bright Warrior: Confessions of a Social Activist", in 2001.

Johannson became Policy Development coordinator for the Green Party of Canada (Manitoba) and the Green Party of Manitoba in 2004.

Electoral record
| Election | Division | Party | Votes | % | Place | Winner |
|---|---|---|---|---|---|---|
| 1981 provincial | Turtle Mountain | New Democratic Party | 1,660 | 25.16 | 2/3 | Brian Ransom, Progressive Conservative |
| 1990 provincial | Assiniboia | New Democratic Party | 1,348 | 16.58 | 3/3 | Linda McIntosh, Progressive Conservative |
| 2003 provincial | Minto | Green | 197 | 3.82 | 4/5 | MaryAnn Mihychuk, New Democratic Party |

== Linda Goossen (River Heights) ==
Goossen is a registered nurse. She wrote a newspaper column on the future of Manitoba nursing in 2002, encouraging graduates of Manitoba programs to stay in the area. She was also a founding editor of Winnipeg's Motherwork magazine, and announced in 1994 that she would only purchase canola oil from organic farmers due to concerns about excessive pesticide use. Goossen opposed the Winnipeg municipal government's decision to spray malathion in the city in 2002. She received 209 votes (2.26%), finishing fourth against Liberal leader Jon Gerrard.

== Alon Weinberg (St. Johns) ==
Weinberg received 221 votes (3.79%), finishing fourth against New Democratic Party incumbent Gord Mackintosh. He ran for the Green Party of Canada in the 2004 federal election.

== Keith Barber (St. Norbert) ==
Barber, a Quaker, managed Agape Table, a soup kitchen in Winnipeg's inner city. Agape suffered financial difficulties in late 2003, before a feature in the Winnipeg Free Press newspaper brought in significant local donations. Barber has written in support of a mixed-member proportional representation electoral system. and was the Green Party's membership coordinator in 2004.

He initially became interested in the green movement while in Trier Germany in 1984, and felt an affinity for the emphasis on social justice, pacifism, environmentalism, egalitarian, collective intelligence and participatory democracy. He was active in the peace movement and straight edge Punk scene prior to encountering the Greens at a planning meeting in Trier to prepare for a protest against the nuclear power stations being built on the German-French Border. His goal in the election was to participate in many conversations about alternatives to grey politics rather than to achieve a large share of the vote. He received 186 votes (2.70%), finishing fourth against New Democratic Party candidate Marilyn Brick.

He also began the process of running in the 2004 federal election for the Greens, and campaigned mostly in First Nations communities such as Grassy Narrows and Big Grassy. While he was campaigning, he was looking for a local candidate to run for the Greens, and recruited Carl Chaboyer, a forestry expert, from Grassy Narrows First Nation to run in the Kenora Riding. He also recruited Trevor Farley to run in the Manitoba Selkirk-Interlake Riding during that same election. In later years he removed himself as a member of the federal party because of the Federal Green Party's shift away from non-violence in its Military policies; and he left the provincial party in 2005, as a result of internal party divisions.

== Nelson P. Morrison (St. Vital) ==
Morrison works for the City of Winnipeg as an industrial instrumentation technologist. He campaigned for Mayor of Winnipeg in the 1998 municipal election at age 38, on a platform of helping the city's poor. He opposed rival candidate Peter Kaufmann's plan to sell Winnipeg Hydro, and tried to present Kaufmann with a sarcastic "For Sale" sign during an all-candidates debate. Morrison indicated that he did not spend any money on this campaign, and finished well behind Glen Murray, the winning candidate.

He ran for Mayor of Winnipeg a second time in 2004, after Murray resigned to campaign for the House of Commons of Canada. He called for the city's executive policy committee to be changed every six months, and opposed a new extension in Waverley West. He finished well behind Sam Katz.

Morrison has served as external liaison on the Manitoba Green party executive. He was a critic of party leader Markus Buchart, whom he unsuccessfully challenged in November 2004. Buchart resigned in March 2005, due to ongoing criticism from within the party.

Electoral record
| Election | Division | Party | Votes | % | Place | Winner |
|---|---|---|---|---|---|---|
| 1998 municipal election | Mayor of Winnipeg | n/a | 1,425 | 0.64 | 6/7 | Glen Murray |
| 2003 provincial | St. Vital | Green | 179 | 2.58 | 4/4 | Nancy Allan, New Democratic Party |
| Winnipeg municipal by-election, 22 June 2004 | Mayor of Winnipeg | n/a | 528 | 0.23 | 8/9 | Sam Katz |

== Connie Jantz (Steinbach) ==
Jantz has served as President of the Green Party of Manitoba, and is active in the Winnipeg arts community. She received 126 votes (2.20%), finishing fourth against Progressive Conservative candidate Kelvin Goertzen.

== Markus Buchart (Wolseley) ==
Buchart was the party leader. He received 1,193 votes (19.49%), finishing second against New Democratic Party candidate Rob Altemeyer. He resigned the party leadership in 2005, as a result of internal party divisions.

== Shelagh Pizey-Allen (Fort Whyte by-election, 16 December 2005) ==
Pizey-Allen was eighteen years old, and was a first-year student at the University of Winnipeg. She had previously been involved with Offramp, the environmental society at Vincent Massey Collegiate in Winnipeg. Pizey-Allen was a member of the Team Canada water polo team in 2003, and played an exhibition game in Cuba.

She was a spokesperson for Concerned Residents Educating Winnipeg (CREW) in the summer of 2005, and argued against spraying malathion to control the city's mosquito population. The group later changed its name to Concerned Residents of Winnipeg (CROW). During the 2005 by-election, Pizey-Allen described herself as left-of-centre on social issues. She received 120 votes (1.77%), finishing fourth against Progressive Conservative Party leader Hugh McFadyen.

Pizey-Allen was charged with mischief in 2006, after taking part in a road blockage in Kenora, Ontario. Protestors had set up the blockage to prevent logging trucks from crossing Separation Bridge. In the summer of 2007, she helped organize a Youth Activist Retreat with a focus on social justice and environmental issues.
