= Green Party of Manitoba candidates in the 2007 Manitoba provincial election =

The Green Party of Manitoba fielded 14 candidates in the 2007 Manitoba provincial election, none of whom were elected. Information about these candidates may be found on this page.

== Kristen Andrews (Point Douglas) ==
Andrews moved from Morden to Winnipeg in 1988. She owns the Ragpickers Antifashion Emporium vintage clothing store, and is a member of Peace Alliance Winnipeg and the Canadian Federation of Independent Business. In 2006, she criticized the Canadian military's decision to hold a major training exercise on the streets of Winnipeg. She received 213 votes (5.30%), finishing fourth against New Democratic Party incumbent George Hickes.

== Christine Bennet-Clark (River Heights) ==
Bennet-Clark was born in Matsqui, British Columbia on September 24, 1949, and was raised in and around Vancouver and Vancouver Island. She is a registered social worker, having completed Social Service Worker training at Algonquin College in Ontario. She has also completed a Bachelor of Arts degree in Psychology from Athabasca University, and at the time of the election was working toward a Master of Arts degree in Adult Education from the University of Calgary and a diploma in Adult Education from St. Francis Xavier University. In 2005, she delivered a presentation entitled "Enaction: Getting our Minds Around Emergent Cognition".

Bennet-Clark moved to Winnipeg in 1999, and has been involved in public debates over malathion spraying and condominium construction in Assiniboine Park. She received 378 votes (4.05%) in the 2007 election, finishing fourth against Manitoba Liberal Party leader Jon Gerrard.

== Ardythe Basham (Wolseley) ==
Basham was born in Manitoba, and holds a Ph.D. in History from the University of British Columbia. She is a volunteer with the Robert A. Steen Community Centre and Friends of the Cornish Library, and has done historical work for both organizations. She served as Green Party of Manitoba president in 2005-06. Her son, Andrew Basham, became party leader in 2006 and led the party into the 2007 provincial election.

Basham's campaign focused on local issues and social housing. She received 763 votes (12.07%), finishing second against New Democratic Party incumbent Rob Altemeyer.
