= Lisa Naylor =

Canadian politician

The Honourable Lisa Naylor MLA

Minister of Transportation and Infrastructure
- Incumbent
- Assumed office October 18, 2023
- Premier: Wab Kinew
- Preceded by: Doyle Piwniuk

Minister of Consumer Protection and Government Services
- In office October 18, 2023 – November 13, 2024
- Premier: Wab Kinew
- Preceded by: James Teitsma
- Succeeded by: Mintu Sandhu as Minister of Public Service Delivery

Member of the Legislative Assembly of Manitoba for Wolseley
- Incumbent
- Assumed office September 10, 2019
- Preceded by: Rob Altemeyer

Winnipeg School Division Trustee for Ward 4
- In office 2014–2019

Personal details
- Born: December 31, 1965 (age 60)
- Party: New Democratic

Lisa Naylor is a Canadian politician, who was elected to the Legislative Assembly of Manitoba in the 2019 Manitoba general election. She represents the electoral district of Wolseley as a member of the New Democratic Party of Manitoba.

Prior to her election to the legislature, Naylor served as a trustee on the Winnipeg School Division board.

As an out lesbian, Naylor successfully fought to have her partner recognized as a legal parent of her child in the early 2000s, prior to the legalization of same-sex marriage in Canada.

== Electoral history ==
2023 Manitoba general election: Wolseley
Party	Candidate	Votes	%	±%	Expenditures
New Democratic	Lisa Naylor	6,582	75.31	+29.28	$15,106.60
Progressive Conservative	Mickey Leuzzi	861	9.85	+0.82	$0.00
Liberal	Philip Spevack	592	6.77	-1.61	$0.00
Green	Janine G. Gibson	553	6.33	-29.67	$7,766.87
Communist	Cam Scott	152	1.74	–	$106.40
Total valid votes/expense limit		8,740	99.60	–	$63,586.00
Total rejected, unmarked and declined ballots		35	0.40	–	
Turnout		8,775	53.77	-3.19	
Eligible voters		16,319			
New Democratic hold		Swing		+14.23	
Source(s) Source: Elections Manitoba

2019 Manitoba general election: Wolseley
Party	Candidate	Votes	%	±%	Expenditures
New Democratic	Lisa Naylor	4,253	46.28	+4.37	$29,044.71
Green	David Nickarz	3,336	36.30	-0.14	$28,329.32
Progressive Conservative	Elizabeth Hildebrand	831	9.04	-3.92	$521.28
Liberal	Shandi Strong	770	8.38	-0.61	$8,359.72
Independent	Eddie Hendrickson	129	1.38	New	$0.00
Total valid votes/expense limit			100.0		$55,109
Total rejected ballots					
Turnout					
Eligible voters					
Source: Elections Manitoba
