= Holly Nelson =

Canadian writer and activist

Leader of the Green Party of Manitoba
- In office 2005–2006
- Preceded by: Daniel Drimes
- Succeeded by: Andrew Basham

Personal details
- Born: Mankato, Minnesota, United States
- Party: Green Party of Manitoba

Holly Nelson is a Canadian writer, poet, activist and print reporter. She served as leader of the Green Party of Manitoba from 2005 to 2006.

== Early life and career ==
Nelson was born in Mankato, Minnesota, United States, the daughter of electrical engineer Forrest Nelson and poet Natalie Nelson. She has lived in Canada since 1973, taking Canadian citizenship in 1980.

She worked for Manitoba Hydro as an engineering aide for 20 years, designing and drafting electrical substations and control circuitry. She left this position to study journalism at Red River College.

== Writer ==
Nelson has written for several media outlets, including the Canadian Broadcasting Corporation, the Manitoba Co-operator and the Herald Leader Press. She won the 2002 Eric and Jack Wells Award for Excellence in Journalism, and has participated in several arts festivals in Winnipeg. Her first publication is a 2004 poetry compilation, All These Stars...and Me With No Bucket.

== Green Party leader ==
Nelson joined the Green Party of Manitoba in 2003, and was acclaimed as its leader at the party's annual meeting in November 2005. The position had been vacant since March, when Markus Buchart resigned as the result of ongoing divisions within the party. Nelson advocated reaching out to older and more conservative Manitoba residents, rather than relying on left-wing campus activists for the party's membership. She also advocated proportional representation, and said that the Greens would only run candidates in a small number of ridings in the next election.

She wrote again the construction of a new Winnipeg slaughterhouse in December 2005, arguing that such enterprises routinely injure young workers and do not provide economic benefits to their host communities.

Nelson resigned as party leader in September 2006, having accepted an out-of-province position. She has never campaigned for public office.
