= James Beddome =

Manitoba Green Politician

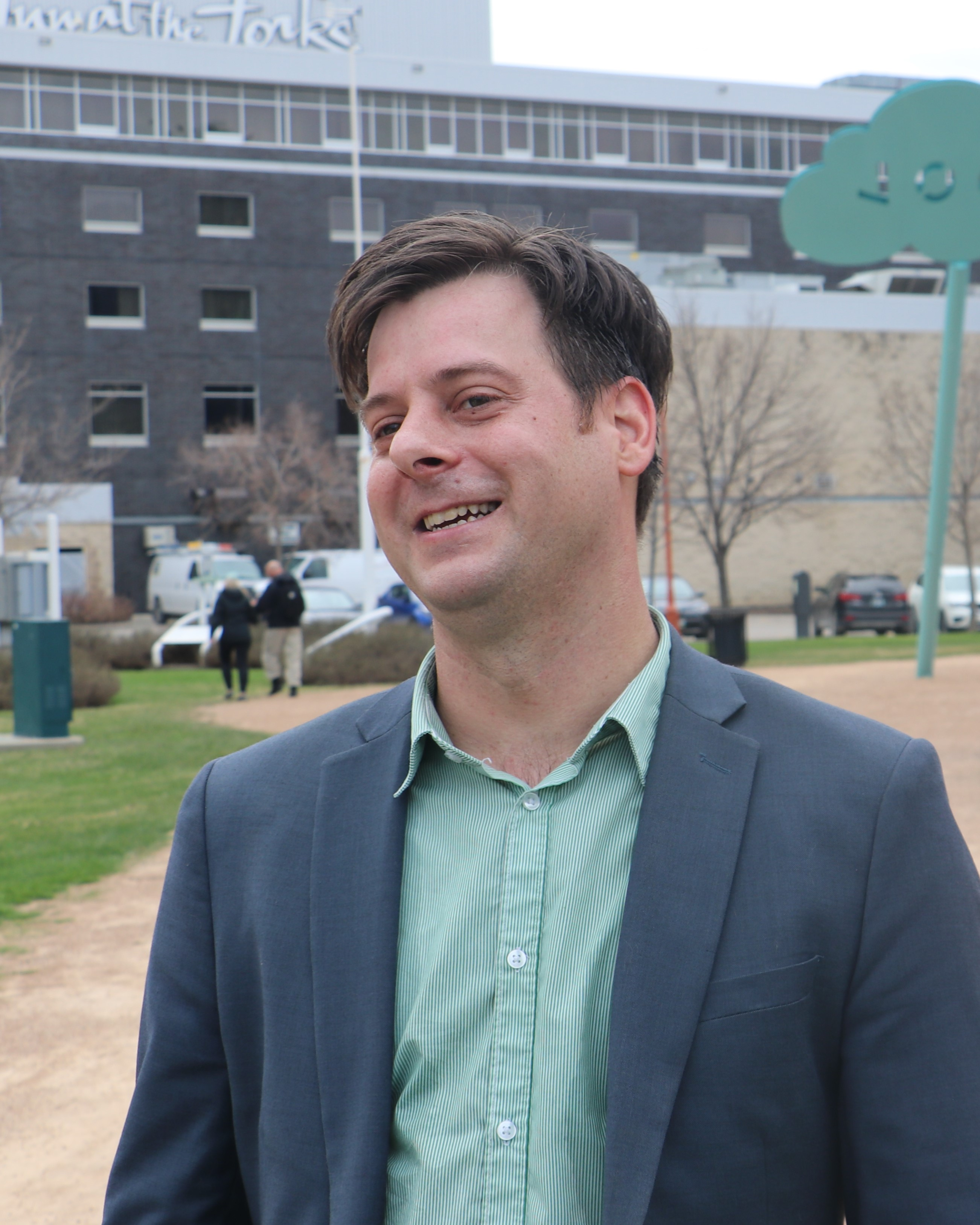

Leader of the Green Party of Manitoba
- In office November 15, 2014 – March 26, 2023
- Preceded by: Alain Landry
- Succeeded by: Janine Gibson
- In office November 15, 2008 – November 22, 2013
- Preceded by: Andrew Basham
- Succeeded by: Alain Landry

Personal details
- Born: James Robert Beddome; October 2, 1983 (age 42) Brandon, Manitoba, Canada
- Party: Green
- Education: University of Manitoba

James Robert Beddome (born October 2, 1983) is a Canadian lawyer and politician who was the former leader of the Green Party of Manitoba from November 2014 to March 2023. He has run in several elections for the provincial party, and was also the Green Party of Canada candidate in Winnipeg South Centre for the 2019 federal election. He works as a lawyer in Manitoba.

== Early life and career ==
Beddome was born in Brandon, Manitoba, and was raised on a livestock farm north of Rapid City. He has an Honours Bachelor of Arts degree in Political Studies and Economics from the University of Manitoba (2006), and has worked as an administrator at Nesbitt Burns. In 2008, he and two partners started a bicycle taxi service in Winnipeg.

Beddome joined the Green Party of Manitoba in 2006, and soon became the chair of its economic policy committee. He worked on Kaj Hasselriis's campaign for Mayor of Winnipeg in 2006, and stood as the Green candidate for the rural division of Minnedosa in the 2007 provincial election. He travelled by bicycle in the latter campaign, carrying a trailer and sleeping at campsites. Beddome said that he wanted to raise awareness about clean modes of transportation as well as the problems faced by family farms.

== Party leader ==
Beddome was elected to a two-year term as Manitoba Green Party leader on November 15, 2008, defeating incumbent Andrew Basham and third candidate Shane Nestruck. After his victory, he said that he would work toward running a full slate of candidates in the next provincial election. He was the party's candidate for a by-election in the northeast Winnipeg division of Elmwood in early 2009. In 2011, he ran as the party's candidate for Wolseley in the general election that year.

In 2013, Beddome stepped down as leader to focus on completing his articles of law after graduating from the faculty of law at the University of Manitoba. Alain Landry was appointed interim party leader for the Manitoba Greens in November 2013.

Beddome ran as a candidate in the party's 2014 leadership race, and was reelected as party leader in November 2014. In the 2016 and 2019 provincial elections he ran in Fort Garry-Riverview and then Fort Rouge. In the 2019 federal election, he ran in Winnipeg South Centre. Beddome had been planning on running for federal election in 2019 before Brian Pallister called the provincial elections early. He was prepared to retract his federal campaign and had a replacement candidate in place, should he have won the provincial seat but Beddome did not win in either election.

In May 2022, Beddome announced that he would step down as leader of the Green Party of Manitoba. He was succeeded by Janine Gibson on March 26, 2023.

== Electoral record ==
2019 Canadian federal election: Winnipeg South Centre
Party	Candidate	Votes	%	±%	Expenditures
Liberal	Jim Carr	22,799	45.00	−14.72	$83,512.07
Conservative	Joyce Bateman	15,051	29.71	+1.52	$37,521.63
New Democratic	Elizabeth Shearer	8,965	17.70	+8.74	$8,170.86
Green	James Beddome	3,173	6.26	+3.13	$3,211.69
People's	Jane MacDiarmid	569	1.12	–	$7,017.57
Christian Heritage	Linda Marynuk	104	0.21	–	none listed
Total valid votes/expense limit		50,661	99.48		
Total rejected ballots		267	0.52	+0.17	
Turnout		50,928	70.97	-5.30	
Eligible voters		71,760			
Liberal hold		Swing		−8.12	
Source: Elections Canada

2019 Manitoba general election: Fort Rouge
Party	Candidate	Votes	%	±%	Expenditures
New Democratic	Wab Kinew	5,055	51.0	+13.4	
Progressive Conservative	Edna Nabess	1,857	18.7	-10.1	
Green	James Beddome	1,580	15.9	+4.9	
Liberal	Cyndy Friesen	1,290	13.0	-7.1	
Manitoba	Michael McCracken	54	0.5	-1.5	
Independent	Bradley Hebert	30	0.3	-0.2	
Total valid votes			100.0		
Total rejected ballots		30			
Turnout		9,913			
Eligible voters		16,870			
Source: Elections Manitoba

2016 Manitoba general election: Fort Garry-Riverview
Party	Candidate	Votes	%	±%	Expenditures
New Democratic	James Allum	3,450	37.84	-17.45	$35,643.17
Progressive Conservative	Jeannette Montufar	3,149	34.53	+1.74	$33,993.08
Green	James Beddome	1,711	18.76	+14.47	$6,131.49
Liberal	Johanna Wood	807	8.85	+1.69	$3,744.00
Total valid votes/Expense limit		9,117	100.0		£44,476.00
Eligible voters		13,402			
Source: Elections Manitoba

2011 Manitoba general election: Wolseley
Party	Candidate	Votes	%	±%	Expenditures
New Democratic	Rob Altemeyer	4,229	60.72	−3.16	21,048.39
Green	James Beddome	1,368	19.64	+7.57	5,635.36
Progressive Conservative	Harpreet Turka	850	12.20	+0.89	8,750.53
Liberal	Eric Stewart	517	7.42	−4.02	5,479.79
Total valid votes		6,964	99.21		
Rejected and declined votes		55	0.78		
Turnout		7,019	55.60		
Registered voters		12,624			
Majority		2,861	25.68	41.08	
Source: Elections Manitoba

Manitoba provincial by-election, March 24, 2009: Elmwood Resignation of Jim Maloway
Party	Candidate	Votes	%	±%	Expenditures
New Democratic	Bill Blaikie	2,325	53.76	-7.75	$17,603.25
Progressive Conservative	Adrian Schulz	913	21.11	0.10	$15,919.78
Liberal	Regan Wolfrom	877	20.28	2.79	$27,106.33
Green	James R. Beddome	210	4.86	–	$1,115.73
Total valid votes		4,325	–	–	
Rejected		14	–		
Eligible voters / turnout		11,907	36.44	−13.54	
Source(s) Source:

2007 Manitoba general election: Minnedosa
Party	Candidate	Votes	%	±%	Expenditures
Progressive Conservative	Leanne Rowat	3,790	52.79	+5.42	$22,692.31
New Democratic	Harvey Paterson	2,769	38.57	-8.63	$16,563.22
Green	James Beddome	281	3.91	–	$1,661.53
Liberal	Christopher Baker	268	3.73	-0.16	$340.29
Independent	Colin Atkins	72	1.00	-0.54	$1,218.45
Total valid votes		7,180	99.68	–	
Rejected		23	0.32	-0.01	
Turnout		7,203	58.99	+2.83	
Eligible voters		12,211			
Progressive Conservative hold		Swing		+7.02	
Source(s) Source: Manitoba. Chief Electoral Officer (2007). Statement of Votes for the 39th Provincial General Election, May 22, 2007 (PDF) (Report). Winnipeg: Elections Manitoba.
