= Janine Gibson (politician) =

Canadian Politician

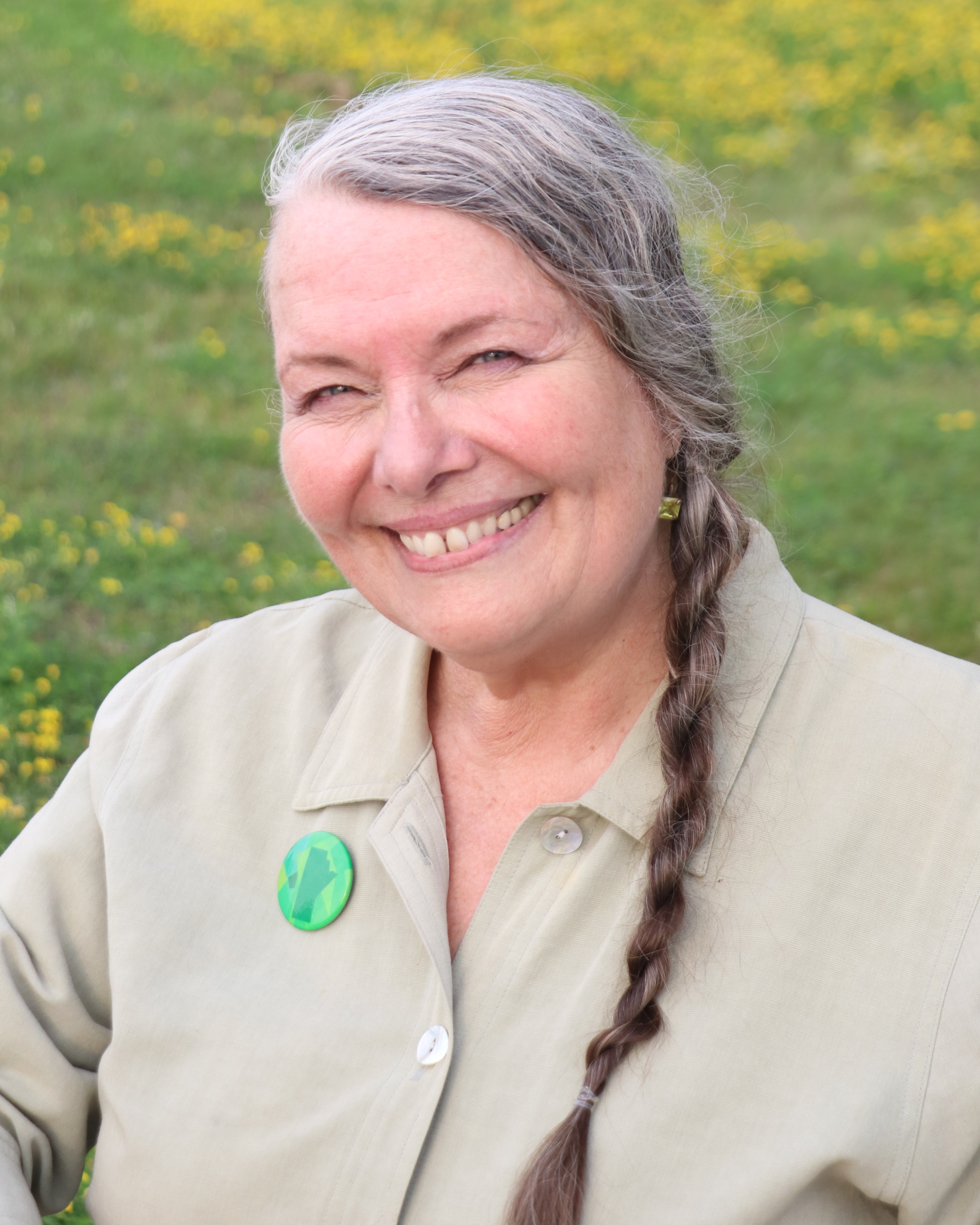

Leader of the Green Party of Manitoba
- Incumbent
- Assumed office March 26, 2023
- Deputy: Dennis Bayomi and Blair Mahaffy
- Preceded by: James Beddome

Personal details
- Party: Green
- Education: University of Winnipeg; University of Manitoba
- Occupation: Organic agriculture consultant

Janine G. Gibson is a Canadian politician, activist, farmer, and organic agriculture consultant who has served as the Leader of the Green Party of Manitoba since March 26, 2023.

Gibson has stood for election seven times as the Green Party of Canada candidate for Provencher and five times for the Green Party of Manitoba, as the candidate for Steinbach in 2007 and 2019, for La Verendrye in 2011 and 2016, and for Wolseley in 2023.

Gibson resides south of Steinbach, Manitoba on a solar-powered farm co-op which she co-founded in 1984. She works as an organic agriculture consultant under her business "Creative Health Consulting" and as an Organic certification inspector and vice-chair of the International Organic Inspectors Association. Gibson is also active as a volunteer for a number of Canadian environmentalist and animal-rights activism and lobbying groups.

At the time of the 2025 Canadian federal election, she lived in Grunthal, Manitoba.

== Electoral Record ==
2025 Canadian federal election: Portage—Lisgar
Party	Candidate	Votes	%	±%	Expenditures
Conservative	Branden Leslie	31,889	69.38		
Liberal	Robert Kreis	10,493	22.82		
New Democratic	Lisa Tessier	2,011	4.38		
People's	Kevin Larson	977	2.13		
Green	Janine G. Gibson	595	1.29		
Total valid votes/expense limit		45,965	99.28		
Total rejected ballots		335	0.72		
Turnout		46,300	67.94		
Eligible voters		68,152			
Source: Elections Canada

Manitoba provincial by-election, June 18, 2024: Tuxedo Resignation of Heather Stefanson
Party	Candidate	Votes	%	±%	Expenditures
New Democratic	Carla Compton	3,777	49.44	+11.95	
Progressive Conservative	Lawrence Pinsky	3,175	41.56	+1.36	
Liberal	Jamie Pfau	569	7.45	-14.85	
Green	Janine Gibson	118	1.54		
Total valid votes		7,639	99.58		
Total rejected and declined ballots		32	0.42	+0.01	
Turnout		7,671	45.62	-14.24	
Eligible voters		16,814			
New Democratic gain from Progressive Conservative		Swing		+5.30	

2023 Manitoba general election: Wolseley
Party	Candidate	Votes	%	±%	Expenditures
New Democratic	Lisa Naylor	6,582	75.31	+29.28	$15,106.60
Progressive Conservative	Mickey Leuzzi	861	9.85	+0.82	$0.00
Liberal	Philip Spevack	592	6.77	-1.61	$0.00
Green	Janine G. Gibson	553	6.33	-29.67	$7,766.87
Communist	Cam Scott	152	1.74	–	$106.40
Total valid votes/expense limit		8,740	99.60	–	$63,586.00
Total rejected, unmarked and declined ballots		35	0.40	–	
Turnout		8,775	53.77	-3.19	
Eligible voters		16,319			
New Democratic hold		Swing		+14.23	
Source(s) Source: Elections Manitoba

2021 Canadian federal election: Provencher
Party	Candidate	Votes	%	±%	Expenditures
Conservative	Ted Falk	24,294	48.7	-17.2	$83,776.96
Liberal	Trevor Kirczenow	8,472	17.0	+3.9	$25,158.99
People's	Nöel Gautron	8,168	16.4	+14.2	$24,179.71
New Democratic	Serina Pottinger	6,270	12.6	-0.2	$0.00
Independent	Rick Loewen	1,366	2.7	N/A	$0.00
Green	Janine G. Gibson	1,272	2.6	-3.4	$1,596.00
Total valid votes/expense limit		49,901	99.5	–	$117,118.32
Total rejected ballots		355	0.5		
Turnout		50,156	67.4		
Eligible voters		74,468			
Conservative hold		Swing		-10.6	
Source: Elections Canada

2019 Canadian federal election: Provencher
Party	Candidate	Votes	%	±%	Expenditures
Conservative	Ted Falk	31,821	65.9	+9.84	$91,792.89
Liberal	Trevor Kirczenow	6,347	13.1	-21.56	$13,417.34
New Democratic	Erin McGee	6,187	12.8	+7.50	none listed
Green	Janine G. Gibson	2,884	6.0	+2.02	none listed
People's	Wayne Sturby	1,066	2.2		none listed
Total valid votes/expense limit		48,305	100.0		
Total rejected ballots		322			
Turnout		48,627	70.5		
Eligible voters		68,979			
Conservative hold		Swing		+7.85	
Source: Elections Canada

2019 Manitoba general election: Steinbach
Party	Candidate	Votes	%	±%	Expenditures
Progressive Conservative	Kelvin Goertzen	6,241	81.64	-7.53	$14,150.78
New Democratic	Robert Jessup	616	8.06	3.12	$612.56
Green	Janine Gibson	418	5.47	–	$0.00
Liberal	LeAmber Kensley	370	4.84	-1.05	$0.00
Total valid votes		7,645	–	–	
Rejected		31	–		
Eligible voters / turnout		14,623	52.49	0.78	
Source(s) Source: Manitoba. Chief Electoral Officer (2019). Statement of Votes for the 42nd Provincial General Election, September 10, 2019 (PDF) (Report). Winnipeg: Elections Manitoba. "Candidate Election Returns". Elections Manitoba. Elections Manitoba.

2016 Manitoba general election: La Verendrye
Party	Candidate	Votes	%	±%
Progressive Conservative	Dennis Smook	5,262	71.23	7.16
Green	Janine Gibson	724	9.80	5.02
New Democratic	Echo Asher	705	9.54	-16.59
Liberal	Bill Paulishyn	696	9.42	4.41
Total valid votes		7,387	–	–
Rejected		78	–	
Eligible voters / turnout		13,494	55.32	1.71
Source(s) Source: Manitoba. Chief Electoral Officer (2016). Statement of Votes for the 41st Provincial General Election, April 19, 2016 (PDF) (Report). Winnipeg: Elections Manitoba.

Canadian federal by-election, November 25, 2013: Provencher Resignation of Vic Toews
Party	Candidate	Votes	%	±%	Expenditures
Conservative	Ted Falk	13,046	58.20	−12.40	$ 83,542.19
Liberal	Terry Hayward	6,711	29.94	+23.23	66,455.27
New Democratic	Natalie Courcelles Beaudry	1,843	8.22	−9.67	17,878.16
Green	Janine Gibson	817	3.64	+0.69	1,074.97
Total valid votes/expense limit		22,417	100.0	–	$ 97,453.98
Total rejected ballots		136	0.60	+0.17	
Turnout		22,553	33.85	−27.88	
Eligible voters		66,624			
Conservative hold		Swing		−17.86	
By-election due to the resignation of Vic Toews.
Source(s) "November 25, 2013 By-elections". Elections Canada. November 26, 2013. "November 25, 2013 By-election – Financial Reports".

2011 Manitoba general election: La Verendrye
Party	Candidate	Votes	%	±%	Expenditures
Progressive Conservative	Dennis Smook	4,487	64.07	26.25	$20,489.51
New Democratic	Maurice Tallaire	1,830	26.13	-24.99	$11,908.18
Liberal	Monica Guetre	351	5.01	-1.22	$4,148.98
Green	Janine Gibson	335	4.78	–	$0.00
Total valid votes		7,003	–	–	
Rejected		30	–		
Eligible voters / turnout		13,119	53.61	-6.45	
Source(s) Source: Manitoba. Chief Electoral Officer (2011). Statement of Votes for the 40th Provincial General Election, October 4, 2011 (PDF) (Report). Winnipeg: Elections Manitoba.

2011 Canadian federal election: Provencher
Party	Candidate	Votes	%	±%	Expenditures
Conservative	Vic Toews	27,820	70.60	+5.95	$70,719.84
New Democratic	Al Mackling	7,051	17.89	+4.17	$14,274.04
Liberal	Terry Hayward	2,645	6.71	-5.86	$25,938.56
Green	Janine Gibson	1,164	2.95	-2.84	$210.00
Christian Heritage	David Reimer	510	1.29	-1.95	$8,372.94
Pirate	Ric Lim	215	0.55	–	$393.24
Total valid votes/expense limit		39,405	100.0	–	$ 90,198.71
Total rejected ballots		169	0.43	-0.00	
Turnout		39,574	61.73	+5.63	
Eligible voters		64,104			
Conservative hold		Swing		+0.89	

2008 Canadian federal election: Provencher
Party	Candidate	Votes	%	±%	Expenditures
Conservative	Vic Toews	23,303	64.65	-1.03	$67,419
New Democratic	Ross Martin	4,947	13.72	+0.01	$6,406
Liberal	Shirley Hiebert	4,531	12.57	-3.27	$16,369
Green	Janine Gibson	2,089	5.79	+1.02	$1,093
Christian Heritage	David Reimer	1,170	3.24	–	$10,130
Total valid votes/expense limit		36,040	100.0	–	$87,213
Total rejected ballots		156	0.43	+0.02	
Turnout		36,196	58.01	-7.04	

2007 Manitoba general election: Steinbach
Party	Candidate	Votes	%	±%	Expenditures
Progressive Conservative	Kelvin Goertzen	6,144	82.98	8.35	$25,321.51
New Democratic	Rawle Squires	641	8.66	-6.59	$331.36
Liberal	Jonathan Thiessen	351	4.74	-3.19	$340.30
Green	Janine G. Gibson	268	3.62	1.42	$421.15
Total valid votes		7,404	–	–	
Rejected		25	–		
Eligible voters / turnout		14,863	49.98	7.99	
Source(s) Source: Manitoba. Chief Electoral Officer (2007). Statement of Votes for the 39th Provincial General Election, May 22, 2007 (PDF) (Report). Winnipeg: Elections Manitoba.

2006 Canadian federal election: Provencher
Party	Candidate	Votes	%	±%	Expenditures
Conservative	Vic Toews	25,199	65.68	+2.66	$40,862.19
Liberal	Wes Penner	6,077	15.84	−9.08	$75,239.46
New Democratic	Patrick O'Connor	5,259	13.71	+4.70	$2,266.71
Green	Janine Gibson	1,830	4.77	+1.72	$87.31
Total valid votes		38,365	100.00		
Total rejected ballots		157	0.41	−0.02	
Turnout		38,522	65.05	+5.38	
Electors on the lists		59,216			
Sources: Official Results, Elections Canada and Financial Returns, Elections Canada.

2004 Canadian federal election: Provencher
Party	Candidate	Votes	%	±%	Expenditures
Conservative	Vic Toews	22,694	63.02	+4.99	$70,851.00
Liberal	Peter Epp	8,975	24.92	−10.94	$64,895.23
New Democratic	Sarah Zaharia	3,244	9.01	+2.90	$1,472.79
Green	Janine Gibson	1,100	3.05	–	$480.59
Total valid votes		36,013	100.00		
Total rejected ballots		155	0.43	+0.07	
Turnout		36,168	59.67	−10.36	
Electors on the lists		60,617			
Percentage change figures are factored for redistribution. Conservative Party percentages are contrasted with the combined Canadian Alliance and Progressive Conservative percentages from 2000.
Sources: Official Results, Elections Canada and Financial Returns, Elections Canada.
