= Wolseley (Manitoba electoral district) =

Provincial electoral district in Manitoba, Canada

Coordinates: 49.883°N 97.161°W

Manitoba electoral district
- Location in Winnipeg

Provincial electoral district
- Legislature: Legislative Assembly of Manitoba
MLA
Lisa Naylor
New Democratic
- District created: 1957
- First contested: 1958
- Last contested: 2023

Wolseley is a provincial electoral district of Manitoba, Canada. It was created by redistribution in 1957, and has formally existed since the 1958 provincial election. The riding is located in the centre of the city of Winnipeg. It is named for Col. Garnet Joseph Wolseley, the nineteenth-century army officer who played a significant role in crushing the Red River Rebellion in 1870.

Wolseley is bordered to the east by Union Station, to the southeast by Fort Rouge, to the south by River Heights, to the north by Notre Dame, and to the west by St. James. The University of Winnipeg is located in the northeast corner of the riding. The Legislative Assembly of Manitoba is located at the meeting point of Wolseley and Fort Rouge.

The riding's population was predominantly Anglo-Saxon when it was first created; a news report from 1969 indicates that its population had become more diverse by that time.

The riding's population in 1996 was 20,472. In 1999, the average family income was $37,794, and the unemployment rate was 16.30%. Half of the riding's residents are categorized as low-income, the second-highest rate in the province. Thirty per cent of families in the riding are single-parent.

The aboriginal population of Wolseley is 19% of the total. Five per cent of the riding's residents are Filipino.

Health and social services account for 13% of Wolseley's industry, with a further 12% in manufacturing.

Wolseley has undergone a number of dramatic political shifts since its creation. It was initially represented by Dufferin Roblin, a Red Tory who served as Premier of Manitoba from 1958 to 1967. He was succeeded by another Progressive Conservative, but in a 1972 by-election the riding was won by Izzy Asper, leader of the Manitoba Liberal Party and subsequently a prominent media baron in Canada. He retained the riding until his retirement in 1975.

The New Democratic Party of Manitoba (NDP) did not win the seat until 1981. However, the riding has been in NDP hands for all but two years since then. In the 2003 election, Green Party leader Markus Buchart ran in this riding and finished second with almost 20% of the vote.

Wolseley also holds the distinction of having elected one of the few MLAs in Manitoba's history to be expelled from parliament: Robert Wilson, who was stripped of his seat in 1981 after being convicted of marijuana-related charges.

== Members of the Legislative Assembly ==
Name	Party	Took office	Left office
Dufferin Roblin	PC	1958	1968
Leonard Claydon	PC	1969	1971
Israel Asper	Lib	1972	1975
Robert Wilson	PC	1975	1980
	Independent PC	1980	1980
	Independent	1980	1981
Myrna Phillips	NDP	1981	1988
Harold Taylor	Lib	1988	1990
Jean Friesen	NDP	1990	2003
Rob Altemeyer	NDP	2003	2019
Lisa Naylor	NDP	2019	present

== Electoral results ==
2023 Manitoba general election
Party	Candidate	Votes	%	±%	Expenditures
New Democratic	Lisa Naylor	6,582	75.31	+29.28	$15,106.60
Progressive Conservative	Mickey Leuzzi	861	9.85	+0.82	$0.00
Liberal	Philip Spevack	592	6.77	-1.61	$0.00
Green	Janine G. Gibson	553	6.33	-29.67	$7,766.87
Communist	Cam Scott	152	1.74	–	$106.40
Total valid votes/expense limit		8,740	99.60	–	$63,586.00
Total rejected, unmarked and declined ballots		35	0.40	–	
Turnout		8,775	53.77	-3.19	
Eligible voters		16,319			
New Democratic hold		Swing		+14.23	
Source(s) Source: Elections Manitoba

2019 Manitoba general election
Party	Candidate	Votes	%	±%	Expenditures
New Democratic	Lisa Naylor	4,253	46.28	+4.37	$29,044.71
Green	David Nickarz	3,336	36.30	-0.14	$28,329.32
Progressive Conservative	Elizabeth Hildebrand	831	9.04	-3.92	$521.28
Liberal	Shandi Strong	770	8.38	-0.61	$8,359.72
Independent	Eddie Hendrickson	129	1.38	New	$0.00
Total valid votes/expense limit			100.0		$55,109
Total rejected ballots					
Turnout					
Eligible voters					
Source: Elections Manitoba

2016 Manitoba general election
Party	Candidate	Votes	%	±%	Expenditures
New Democratic	Rob Altemeyer	3,037	41.27	-19.46	$32,887.29
Green	David Nickarz	2,645	35.94	+16.30	$15,710.81
Progressive Conservative	Raquel Dancho	945	12.84	+0.64	$7,262.81
Liberal	Shandi Strong	653	8.87	+1.45	$3,844.07
Manitoba	Wayne Sturby	79	1.07		$1,094.12
Total valid votes/expense limit		7,359	98.92		$39,244.00
Total rejected ballots		80	1.08	+0.29	
Turnout		7,439	63.26	+7.66	
Eligible voters		11,759			
New Democratic hold		Swing		-17.88	
Source: Elections Manitoba

2011 Manitoba general election
Party	Candidate	Votes	%	±%	Expenditures
New Democratic	Rob Altemeyer	4,229	60.72	−3.16	21,048.39
Green	James Beddome	1,368	19.64	+7.57	5,635.36
Progressive Conservative	Harpreet Turka	850	12.20	+0.89	8,750.53
Liberal	Eric Stewart	517	7.42	−4.02	5,479.79
Total valid votes		6,964	99.21		
Rejected and declined votes		55	0.78		
Turnout		7,019	55.60		
Registered voters		12,624			
Majority		2,861	25.68	41.08	
Source: Elections Manitoba

2007 Manitoba general election
Party	Candidate	Votes	%	±%	Expenditures
New Democratic	Rob Altemeyer	4,038	63.88	+6.98	$21,917.13
Green	Ardythe Basham	763	12.07	-7.42	$1,096.00
Liberal	Raven Thundersky	723	11.44	-1.08	$4,743.98
Progressive Conservative	Gustav Nelson	715	11.31	+0.22	$3,946.16
Communist	David Tymoshchuk	82	1.30		$373.87
Total valid votes		6,321	100.00		
Rejected and declined votes		53			
Turnout		6,374	55.28		
Registered voters		11,531			

2003 Manitoba general election
Party	Candidate	Votes	%	±%	Expenditures
New Democratic	Rob Altemeyer	3,482	56.90	-12.25	$20,948.83
Green	Markus Buchart	1,193	19.49	+14.83	$5,307.87
Liberal	Val Mollison	766	12.52		$4,591.54
Progressive Conservative	Ashley Burner	679	11.09	-10.97	$1,006.54
Total valid votes		6,120	100.00		
Rejected and declined votes		77			
Turnout		6,197	53.14		
Registered voters		11,662			

1999 Manitoba general election
Party	Candidate	Votes	%	Expenditures
New Democratic	Jean Friesen	5,282	69.15	$16,153.00
Progressive Conservative	Carol Roberts	1,685	22.06	$13,845.42
Green	Phyllis Abbé	356	4.66	$4,591.54
Communist	David Allison	133	1.74	$0.00
Total valid votes		7,456	100.00	
Rejected and declined votes		182		
Turnout		7,638	53.14	
Registered voters		11,464		

1988 Manitoba general election
Party	Candidate	Votes	%	±%
Liberal	Harold Taylor	3,618	42.78	+
New Democratic	Myrna Phillips	3,112	36.79	-
Progressive Conservative	Kirk Stanley	1,579	18.67	-
Progressive	Derek Shettler	149	1.76	
Total valid votes		8,458	100.00	-
Rejected ballots		33	–	–
Turnout		8,491	74.44	
Eligible voters		11,406		
Source: Elections Manitoba

1977 Manitoba general election
Party	Candidate	Votes	%	±%
Progressive Conservative	Robert Wilson	2,763	41.01	+18.63
New Democratic	Murdoch MacKay	2,689	39.90	+1.12
Liberal	Norma McCormick	1,286	19.09	-19.74
Turnout		6,873	74.98	
Progressive Conservative gain from Liberal		Swing		+19.18
Source: Elections Manitoba

Manitoba provincial by-election, February 20, 1969 Resignation of Duff Roblin
Party	Candidate	Votes	%	±%	Expenditures
Progressive Conservative	Leonard Claydon	2,161	46.62		$2,640.69
Liberal	Julius Koteles	1,528	33.01	–	$10,753.19
New Democratic	Archie Stone	944	20.37		$1,423.50
Total valid votes		4,633	98.38		
Rejected and discarded votes		75	1.62		
Turnout		4,708	41.97		
Electors on the lists		11,217			

1966 Manitoba general election
Party	Candidate	Votes	%	±%
Progressive Conservative	Dufferin Roblin	3,132	48.88	
Liberal	Julius Koteles	1,780	27.78	
New Democratic	Cecil Wood	1,495	23.33	
Total valid votes		6,407	100.00	
Rejected and discarded votes		45		
Turnout		6,452	55.52	
Electors on the lists		11,621		

== Previous boundaries ==
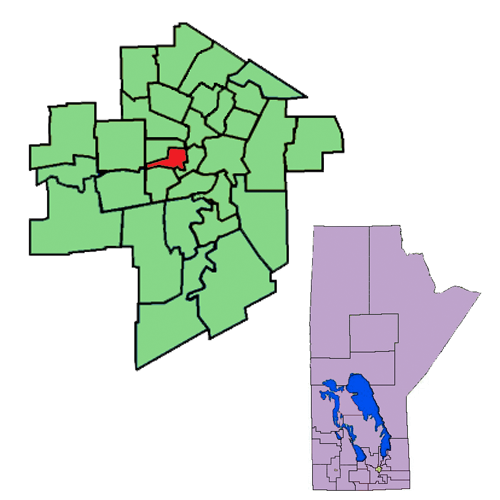
The 1999–2011 boundaries for Wolseley highlighted in red.

== See also ==
- List of Manitoba provincial electoral districts
- Canadian provincial electoral districts
