= Green Party of Manitoba candidates in the 1999 Manitoba provincial election =

The Green Party of Manitoba fielded six candidates in the 1999 provincial election, none of whom were elected. Information about these candidates may be found on this page.

== Chris Billows (River Heights) ==
Billows was a founding member of the Manitoba Green Party of Manitoba, and served as its official spokesman before its first leader was chosen. In announcing the party's creation in 1998, he said "The province can only solve its many economic and social problems if it addresses at the same time the serious environmental mess the other parties have created while in government". He received 92 votes (0.80%) in the 1999 election, finishing fourth against Manitoba Liberal Party leader Jon Gerrard.
