= New Democratic Party of Manitoba candidates in the 2003 Manitoba provincial election =

The New Democratic Party of Manitoba fielded a full slate of candidates in the 2003 provincial election, and won a majority government with 35 of 57 seats in the Manitoba legislature. Many of their party's candidates have their own biography pages; information about others may be found here.

This page also provides information on New Democratic Party candidates in by-elections between 2003 and 2005.

== Perry Kalynuk (Arthur-Virden) ==
Kalynuk was born and raised in Angusville, and has a degree from Brandon University. He has taught high school in Virden and Waskada. He first campaigned for the New Democratic Party in the 1999 provincial election, after defeating social worker Janet Brady for the party nomination. He supports single-desk marketing through the Canadian Wheat Board, and criticized Progressive Conservative candidate Larry Maguire for opposing the CWB's status. Kalynuk has also said that the board should accommodate new generation cooperatives. He supported Bill Blaikie for the federal New Democratic Party leadership in 2002. Kalynuk worked as a teacher in Kuwait for ten months in 2004-05.

Electoral record
Election	Division	Party	Votes	%	Place	Winner
1999 provincial	Arthur-Virden	New Democratic Party	3,063	35.79	2/3	Larry Maguire, Progressive Conservative
2003 provincial	Arthur-Virden	New Democratic Party	3,219	41.89	2/3	Larry Maguire, Progressive Conservative

== Janine Ballingall Scotten (Fort Whyte) ==
Ballingal Scotten has worked as a counsellor at the Youville Centre and St. Raphael Centre in Winnipeg (Winnipeg Free Press, 4 May 1998), and has specialized in treatment for sexual addiction (WFP, 29 September 2001). She has noted that many "sexual addicts" were abused as children, and has observed the shame attached to the term has forced many to keep in hiding. She has also been active with Habitat for Humanity (WFP, 11 June 2003).

She received 2,647 votes (28.13%) in 2003, finishing second against Progressive Conservative incumbent John Loewen.

== Dennis Kshyk (Kirkfield Park) ==
Kshyk received 2,855 votes (31.06%), finishing second against Progressive Conservative leader Stuart Murray. See his biography page for more information.

== Kristin Bingeman (River Heights) ==
Bingeman was 29 years old at the time of the election. She holds a Master's Degree in Natural Resource Management from the University of Manitoba, and has written for the Sierra Club. She received 1,824 votes (19.74%), finishing third against Manitoba Liberal Party leader Jon Gerrard.

== Christina McDonald (Fort Whyte by-election, 13 December 2005) ==
McDonald has a Bachelor of Arts degree in early years' education (1991), a Master of Arts degree in curriculum development (1994) and an interdisciplinary Ph.D. in education from the University of Manitoba (2003). She was an administrator at the University of Manitoba's Natural Resources Institute from 1982 to 1998, when she became Sustainable Development Coordinator for Manitoba Advanced Education and Training. As of 2007, she holds the same position with Manitoba Education, Citizenship and Youth. She is also a director of the Manitoba Forestry Association. McDonald received 1,650 votes (24.34%) in the election, finishing second against Progressive Conservative candidate Hugh McFadyen.
