= Global Change Game =

The Global Change Game is a large-scale educational simulation devised in Winnipeg in December 1991 by a group of students from the University of Manitoba, including Rob Altemeyer. The game is played on "a colourful hand-painted world map the size of a basketball court". It is a simulation that involves exploring, understanding and solving some of the global issues of its time.

== Gameplay ==
A large map of the world is laid out. The game involves approximately 70 participants (depending on the size of the venue). Each participant is randomly assigned to one of ten regions in the world: North America, Latin America, Europe, the Commonwealth of Independent States, Africa, The Middle East, India, Southeast Asia, China and the Pacific Rim. Each player represents roughly 100 million people. Each region begins with realistic assets and problems. North America, Europe and the Pacific Rim are relatively wealthy, for example, while India and Africa have greater levels of poverty. Each region selects a leader, who is given a vest, tie, and hat to identify themselves. Tokens representing access to food, health care and employment are distributed to players based on actual global data; tokens representing industries and natural resources are placed in each region; and leaders are given tokens representing their region's money and military power and their own personal wealth.

The Game typically lasts about three hours, covering 30 to 40 years of simulated time. During the Game, players are challenged to develop their economies to provide food, health care and employment for everyone, and to solve environmental problems facing their regions. Players who lack food, health care, or employment are periodically given black arm bands for each of these "necessities of life" that they are missing; any player who receives three black arm bands will be declared dead. Income and pollution arising from industries are distributed periodically, and population growth will occur in some regions, placing additional pressure on economies and resources. Players trade resources among themselves and invest money in industries or in creative solutions to problems facing their regions. While the game is in play, facilitators move around the map to work with the players to determine whether the players' proposals for regional policies are feasible or not, and to assess the consequences. For example, failure to deal with deforestation or soil erosion may lead to consequences for food production, or failure to control pollution may have consequences for health. Global problems such as global warming may also affect the course of events. Leaders can also choose to declare war; victory is determined by the number of military tokens deployed, but if nuclear weapons are used, serious global consequences result.

== Issues ==
The list of issues raised in the game is as follows:

- Hunger
- Health and Nutrition
- Sustainable Development
- International Relations
- Deforestation
- Desertification
- Agricultural practices
- Resource consumption
- Population growth
- War
- Pollution
- International trade
- Economic disparity
- Biodiversity
- Ozone Depletion
- Climate Change
- Energy alternatives
- Gender issues
- Resource Distribution
- Refugees and immigration
- Geography
- Education

== Use in research ==
In a 1994 study by American-Canadian psychologist Bob Altemeyer, 68 subjects chosen as demonstrating high levels of right-wing authoritarianism played a three-hour version of the Global Change Game, and were compared to a comparison game played by individuals with low RWA scores.

The game played by those with low scores resulted in world peace and widespread international cooperation. Seven men and three women made themselves team leader "Elites", and the Elites agreed to meet for talks on "the Island Paradise of Tasmania" whenever an international crisis arose. The three superpowers favored nuclear disarmament at the start of the game, and no wars occurred during the game. When an ozone layer depletion crisis arose, the world's Elites contributed sufficient money to resolve the problem through technology. The game ended with 400 million deaths to disease and starvation in India and Africa, but Altemeyer considered it "actually a highly successful run of the game, compared to most".

In the simulation played by authoritarians, all eight Elite roles were taken by men. The game quickly became highly militarised, with no countries choosing to disarm their nuclear weapons. The game opened with the Elite from the Middle East doubling oil prices, and the Soviet Union investing in armies to invade North America. The North American Elites retaliated with nuclear weapons, instantly ending the game in a nuclear holocaust. When this happens in the game, the facilitators turn off the lights in the room and explain the consequences of the nuclear war, before giving the players a "second chance", turning the game clock back two years. The Soviet Union invaded China instead of the United States, and nuclear war remained a threat for the remainder of the game. Africa and Asia collapsed having spent their resources buying into alliances, and by the end of the game 1.7 billion people had died.

Elites in both games had the option to siphon their country's funds to private accounts, with a prize being given at the end of the game to "World's Richest Person". The Elites in the high-RWA group siphoned more than twice the amount that the low-RWA group had, and Altemeyer attributed the disparity in game outcomes to this, as well as a tendency for high-RWAs to care more about their own group than outsiders.

Extrapolating conclusions from the study has been criticised by some researchers, such as criticism of its small sample size (the game only had two "runs"), as well as whether the personality variables of the participants would have much real world effect compared to the effects of social norms. It has also been argued that since the Global Change Game and its outcome is dependent upon researcher assumptions about how the world works (with death toll being calculated by their own formula to account for poverty, disease and war), it may not necessarily reflect reality and authoritarians would thus struggle to "win" the simulation as they would not necessarily share the researchers' assumptions. For example, authoritarians were more inclined to focus on domestic problems rather than global ones, engaging in little international interaction of any kind (either coercive or cooperative) but the game is designed to punish such isolationist behaviour and reward international cooperation.

== See also ==
- Risks to civilization, humans and planet Earth
