= Independent candidates in the 2003 Manitoba provincial election =

There were two independent candidates in the 2003 Manitoba provincial election, neither of who were elected. They received a total of 167 votes. Information about these candidates may be found on this page.

== Didz Zuzens (Fort Garry) ==
Zuzens has campaigned for the House of Commons of Canada and the Legislative Assembly of Manitoba on a total of four occasions.

He intended to register as a Libertarian Party of Canada candidate for his first federal campaign in 1997, but was informed by an Elections Canada official that he could not do so as the party had withdrawn from the election. Zuzens acknowledged that he had been told of the party's decertification before registering, but added "Maybe I didn't want to hear that I wasn't going to be the candidate. It may be delirious, but I just refused to believe that". He registered as an independent candidate in 1997, and again in 2000.

At the provincial level, Zuzens campaigned for the Libertarian Party of Manitoba in 1999 and as an independent in 2003. The LPM was registered for the 2003 election, and it is unclear why Zuzens ran as an independent.

Zuzens lists himself as retired. He wrote against Canada's public health system in 2000, describing it as the "Canada Waiting List" system.

Electoral record
Election	Division	Party	Votes	%	Place	Winner
1997 federal	Winnipeg Centre	Independent	44	0.16	8/8	Pat Martin, New Democratic Party
1999 provincial	Minto	Libertarian	27	0.38	5/5	MaryAnn Mihychuk, New Democratic Party
2000 federal	Winnipeg South	Independent	183	0.43	5/5	Reg Alcock, Liberal
2003 provincial	Fort Garry	Independent	61	0.74	4/4	Kerri Irvin-Ross, New Democratic Party

== Colin Atkins (Minnedosa) ==
Atkins is a leading organizer for the federal Christian Heritage Party in Manitoba. He received 106 votes (1.54%), finishing fourth against Progressive Conservative candidate Leanne Rowat.
