= Markus Buchart =

Canadian politician

Leader of the Green Party of Manitoba
- In office 1999–2005
- Preceded by: first leader
- Succeeded by: Daniel Drimes

Personal details
- Party: Green Party of Manitoba

Markus Buchart is a lawyer and politician in Manitoba, Canada. He was the first leader of the Green Party of Manitoba, serving from 1999 until his resignation in March 2005.

== Early life and private career ==
Buchart has a Bachelor of Arts degree from the University of Manitoba and a Master's Degree from McGill University, both in Economics. He was a provincial civil servant from 1986 to 1992, working for both Progressive Conservative and New Democratic Party governments on tax policy, federal-provincial relations and environmental policy. He left in 1992, disappointed with the government's environmental direction. He received a law degree from the University of Manitoba in 1995, and ran an independent law practice for several years before joining the downtown Winnipeg law firm of Tupper & Adams in 2004. His practice consists mainly of civil litigation. In late 2006, he moved to the firm of Pullan Kammerloch Frohlinger.

Buchart has been active with several environmental, peace and social justice groups, and was an editor and writer for the local environmental quarterly Links Magazine from 1989 to 1998. In one 1995 article, he wrote that Manitoba civil servants had been instructed to write environmental laws and regulations so as to ensure that the government would not be held liable for lax enforcement. He has repeatedly called for Manitoba to improve its water safety legislation, noting that the provincial Environment Act exempts farmland from its provisions. Buchart criticized a water safety bill introduced by Steve Ashton in 2004, arguing that while it would provide for effective testing, it would not prevent waste-runoff from entering the water system in the first place. He has also argued that the province ignored its own laws by allowing the City of Winnipeg to spray malathion against mosquitoes.

Buchart opposed the True North Entertainment Centre's bid to construct an arena on the site of Winnipeg's old Eaton's building in 2002. He spearheaded a court challenge against the Assiniboine Credit Union's decision to fund the project, describing the initiative as a risky venture for members (including himself). He later drew attention to the initial transfer of ownership for the Eaton's building, which was permitted on a sworn value of $10 and resulted in the non-payment of a provincial land transfer tax. Following criticism, the government imposed a transfer tax of $100,000. The property was valued at five million dollars in a subsequent transfer of ownership.

== Political career ==
Buchart describes himself as a "blue-green", and is on the eco-capitalist wing of Canada's green movement. He was chosen as the Manitoba Green Party's first leader in 1999, one year after the party's creation. The Manitoba Greens fielded six candidates in the 1999 provincial election, and Buchart ran against Progressive Conservative Premier Gary Filmon in the Tuxedo constituency. He declared his support for small business in this election, arguing that small enterprises provide jobs for local economies and cause less pollution than large companies. He also drew attention to the fact that several municipalities in southeastern Manitoba were donating public tax revenues to political parties, a practice that he strongly criticized.

The Green Party ran fourteen candidates in the 2003 election, and ran a more visible campaign than in 1999. Buchart criticized the governing New Democratic Party's stewardship of the environment, and said that his party would amend the provincial Parks Act to provide protection to all parks. He campaigned in the Wolseley constituency, and received 1,193 votes (19.5%) for a second-place finish against New Democrat Rob Altemeyer. No other GPM candidate received more than 7% support. Buchart's leadership was challenged by Nelson Morrison in November 2004, but he handily retained his position.

Buchart resigned as party leader in March 2005, saying that Green Party meetings and committees were being disrupted by a small group of "unruly and ungovernable" radical members. Six other members of the party executive resigned at the same time. Buchart argued that his opponents were more interested in "placard-waving protests" than in building a serious political party.

Buchart announced the creation of the Winnipeg Green Party in May 2006, and campaigned under its banner in the 2006 municipal election. The City of Winnipeg does not officially recognize parties, and all municipal Green candidates appeared on the ballot as independents. In addition to promoting environmental goals, the Winnipeg Greens called for Video Lottery Terminals to be removed from all bars, restaurants and city-owned casinos.

Buchart supported Jim Harris's tenure as leader of the federal Green Party, and campaigned for David Chernushenko to become Harris's successor in 2006. Buchart is the personal lawyer of ex-Mayor candidate Alex "Creampuff boy" Reid.

== Electoral record ==
2006 Winnipeg municipal election: City Councillor, St. Vital Ward
Candidate	Votes	%
(x)Gord Steeves	10,762	75.38
Leslie Fingler	2,466	17.27
Markus Buchart	1,049	7.35
Total valid votes	14,277	100.00

2003 Manitoba general election: Wolseley
Party	Candidate	Votes	%	±%	Expenditures
New Democratic	Rob Altemeyer	3,482	56.90	-12.25	$20,948.83
Green	Markus Buchart	1,193	19.49	+14.83	$5,307.87
Liberal	Val Mollison	766	12.52		$4,591.54
Progressive Conservative	Ashley Burner	679	11.09	-10.97	$1,006.54
Total valid votes		6,120	100.00		
Rejected and declined votes		77			
Turnout		6,197	53.14		
Registered voters		11,662			

1999 Manitoba general election: Tuxedo
Party	Candidate	Votes	%	±%	Expenditures
Progressive Conservative	Gary Filmon	5,952	60.72	-5.50	$24,905.00
New Democratic	Jack Dubois	2,333	23.80	+12.70	$1,636.00
Liberal	Rochelle Zimberg	1,391	14.19	-8.48	$1,406.60
Green	Markus Buchart	126	1.29		$49.01
Total valid votes/expense limit		9,802	99.25	–	
Total rejected and declined ballots		74	0.75	+0.38	
Turnout		9,876	71.83	-1.27	
Eligible voters		13,749			
Progressive Conservative hold		Swing		-9.10	

All electoral information is taken from Elections Manitoba and the City of Winnipeg. Expenditure entries refer to individual candidate expenses.
