= 2003 Manitoba general election =

- June 3, 2003

57 seats of the Legislative Assembly of Manitoba 29 seats were needed for a majority
- Turnout: 54.17% (▼13.94%)
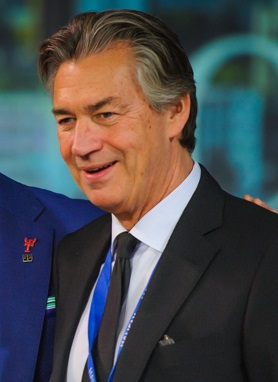

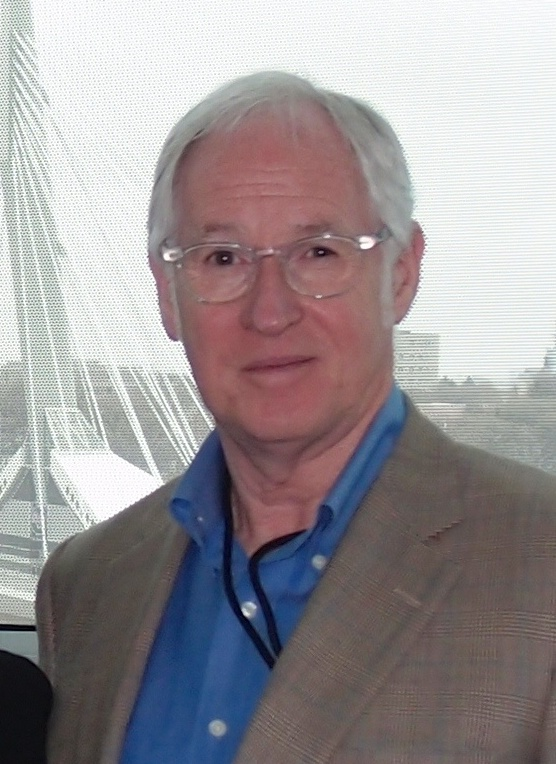

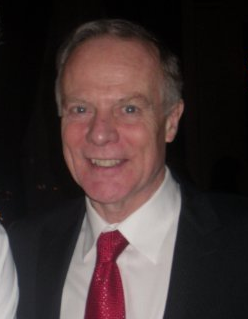
	First party	Second party	Third party
Leader	Gary Doer	Stuart Murray	Jon Gerrard
Party	New Democratic	Progressive Conservative	Liberal
Leader since	March 30, 1988	November 4, 2000	October 17, 1998
Leader's seat	Concordia	Kirkfield Park	River Heights
Last election	32	24	1
Seats won	35	20	2
Seat change	▲3	▼4	▲1
Popular vote	195,425	142,967	52,123
Percentage	49.47%	36.19%	13.19%
Swing	▲4.96pp	▼4.65pp	▼0.21pp
- Popular vote by riding. As this is an FPTP election, seat totals are not determined by popular vote, but instead via results by each riding. Click the map for more details.
Premier before election
Gary Doer
New Democratic
Premier after election
Gary Doer
New Democratic

The 2003 Manitoba general election was held on June 3, 2003 to elect Members of the Legislative Assembly of the Province of Manitoba, Canada. It was won by the New Democratic Party, which won 35 seats out of 57 (net gain of 3), securing another term for premier Gary Doer.

The Progressive Conservative Party finished second with twenty seats, a net loss of 4 from 1999. The Liberal Party won two seats, a net gain of one from the previous election.

An article in The Globe and Mail attributed the NDP's strong performance to premier Doer's tenure, where he was seen as having "delivered a reasonable economic performance and a steady stream of budget surpluses."

== Results ==
Summary of the June 3, 2003 Manitoba Legislature election results
Party	Party leader	Candidates	Seats				Popular vote		
Party	Party leader	Candidates	1999	Dissol.	2003	+ / —	#	%	Change
New Democratic	Gary Doer	57	32	31	35	+3	195,425	49.47%	+4.96%
Progressive Conservative	Stuart Murray	57	24	23	20	−4	142,967	36.19%	−4.65%
Liberal	Jon Gerrard	57	1	1	2	+1	52,123	13.19%	−0.21%
Green	Markus Buchart	14	0	0	0	—	3,792	0.96%	+0.76%
Communist	Darrell Rankin	5	0	0	0	—	334	0.08%	−0.01%
Libertarian	Chris Buors	5	0	0	0	—	248	0.06%	-0.07%
Independents and no affiliation		2	0	1	0	—	167	0.04%	−0.19%
Vacant				2					
Total		196	57	57	57	—	397,069	54.17%	
Registered Voters							732,946		

^{1} One of the two independent candidates is a member of the federal Christian Heritage Party, while the other was formerly a candidate of the Libertarian Party.

=== Vote and seat summaries ===
Ternary plots – shift of electoral support (1999–2003)
1999

2003
Electoral districts identified by colours of winning parties

Popular vote
New Democratic	49.47%
PC	36.19%
Liberal	13.19%
Others	1.14%

Seats summary
New Democratic	61.40%
PC	35.08%
Liberal	3.50%

=== Results by riding ===
Party key:

- PC: Progressive Conservative Party of Manitoba
- L: Manitoba Liberal Party
- NDP: New Democratic Party of Manitoba
- G: Manitoba Green Party
- Comm: Communist Party of Canada - Manitoba
- Lbt: Libertarian Party of Manitoba
- Ind: Independent

Election expenditures refer only to candidate expenses.

==== Northern Manitoba / Parkland ====
Electoral district	Candidates					Incumbent
Electoral district	NDP	PC	Liberal	Green	Other	Incumbent
Dauphin-Roblin	Stan Struthers; 4602 (54.27%)	Bill Griffin; 2979 (35.13%)	Joelle Robinson; 683 (8.05%)	Larry Powell; 216 (2.55%)		Stan Struthers
Flin Flon	Gerard Jennissen; 2402 (73.21%)	Lloyd Macdonald; 322 (9.81%)	Garry Zamzow; 557 (16.98%)			Gerrard Jennissen
Rupertsland	Eric Robinson; 2203 (87.52%)	Cory Phillips; 152 (6.04%)	Orville Woodford; 162 (6.44%)			Eric Robinson
Swan River	Rosann Wowchuk; 4701 (63.00%)	Jason Shaw; 2223 (29.79%)	Russell McKay; 538 (7.21%)			Rosann Wowchuk
The Pas	Oscar Lathlin; 3104 (65.61%)	Richard Goudy; 791 (16.72%)	Mark Sweeny; 836 (17.67%)			Oscar Lathlin
Thompson	Steve Ashton; 3291 (82.73%)	Bill Archer; 532 (13.37%)	Myrle Traverse; 155 (3.90%)			Steve Ashton

==== Westman ====
Electoral district	Candidates					Incumbent
Electoral district	NDP	PC	Liberal	Green	Other	Incumbent
Arthur-Virden	Perry Kalynuk; 3,219 (41.89%)	Larry Maguire; 4,135 (53.80%)	Vaughn Ramsay; 331 (4.31%)			Larry Maguire
Brandon East	Drew Caldwell; 3,870 (62.04%)	Greg Dinsdale; 2,036 (32.64%)	Scott Brigden; 274 (4.39%)		Lisa Gallagher (Communist); 58 (0.93%)	Drew Caldwell
Brandon West	Scott Smith; 5,210 (61.02%)	Reg Atkinson; 2,982 (34.93%)	Candace Sigurdson; 346 (4.05%)			Scott Smith
Minnedosa	Harvey Paterson; 3,247 (47.19%)	Leanne Rowat; 3,259 (47.37%)	Gordon Powell; 268 (3.90%)		Colin Atkins (Independent); 106 (1.54%)	Harold Gilleshammer
Russell	Don Yanick; 3,208 (40.78%)	Len Derkach; 4,087 (51.96%)	Joan Clement; 571 (7.26%)			Len Derkach

==== Central Manitoba ====
Electoral district	Candidates					Incumbent
Electoral district	NDP	PC	Liberal	Green	Other	Incumbent
Carman	Bill Harrison; 1,445 (21.27%)	Denis Rocan; 3,523 (51.86%)	Don Oldcorn; 1,825 (26.87%)			Denis Rocan†
Gimli	Peter Bjornson; 5,500 (56.56%)	Vern Sabeski; 3,651 (37.54%)	Lynn Clark; 574 (5.90%)			Ed Helwer
Interlake	Tom Nevakshonoff; 3,858 (63.76%)	Betty Green; 1,796 (29.68%)	Leslie Jacobson; 397 (6.56%)			Tom Nevakshonoff
Lakeside	Robert Marshall; 3,015 (38.85%)	Ralph Eichler; 4,110 (52.96%)	Louis Allain; 636 (8.19%)			Harry Enns
Morris	John Auger; 1,588 (22.71%)	Mavis Taillieu; 3,996 (57.16%)	Michael van Walleghem; 1,407 (20.13%)			Frank Pitura
Pembina	Mary Johnson; 877 (14.24%)	Peter George Dyck; 4,694 (76.24%)	Marilyn Skubovious; 505 (8.20%)		Aaron Crossman (Communist); 81 (1.32%)	Peter George Dyck
Portage la Prairie	Bob Kriski; 3,023 (42.73%)	David Faurschou; 3,524 (49.82%)	Mike Lefebvre; 527 (7.45%)			David Faurschou
Selkirk	Greg Dewar; 4,580 (62.69%)	Doug Neal; 1,257 (17.20%)	Jack Jonasson; 1,469 (20.11%)			Greg Dewar
Ste. Rose	John Harapiak; 2,301 (35.14%)	Glen Cummings; 3,709 (56.64%)	Wendy Menzies; 538 (8.22%)			Glen Cummings†
Turtle Mountain	Lonnie Patterson; 1,893 (28.72%)	Merv Tweed; 3,956 (60.01%)	Bev Leadbeater; 743 (11.27%)			Merv Tweed

==== Eastman ====
Electoral district	Candidates					Incumbent
Electoral district	NDP	PC	Liberal	Green	Other	Incumbent
Emerson	Luc Gendreau; 1,137 (19.25%)	Jack Penner; 3,509 (59.41%)	Len Schieman; 1,260 (21.34%)			Jack Penner†
Lac du Bonnet	Michael Hameluck; 3,875 (45.35%)	Gerald Hawranik; 4,380 (51.26%)	Cheryl Appleyard; 290 (3.39%)			Gerald Hawranik
La Verendrye	Ron Lemieux; 3,881 (58.07%)	Gerard Simard; 2,310 (34.57%)	Paula Ryplanski Marsch; 492 (7.36%)			Ron Lemieux
Springfield	Georgine Spooner; 2,512 (30.97%)	Ron Schuler; 4,917 (60.62%)	Vince Boileau; 682 (8.41%)			Ron Schuler
Steinbach	Bonnie Schmidt; 875 (15.24%)	Kelvin Goertzen; 4,284 (74.63%)	Monica Guetre; 455 (7.93%)	Connie Jantz; 126 (2.20%)		Jim Penner

==== Northwest Winnipeg ====
Electoral district	Candidates					Incumbent
Electoral district	NDP	PC	Liberal	Green	Other	Incumbent
Burrows	Doug Martindale; 4,004 (69.01%)	Derek Lambert; 423 (7.29%)	Tony Sanchez; 1,252 (21.58%)	Catherine Johannson; 123 (2.12%)		Doug Martindale
Inkster	Mario Santos; 2,851 (41.46%)	Michael Ledarney; 251 (3.65%)	Kevin Lamoureux; 3,671 (53.39%)	Mario Ducusin; 103 (1.50%)		Becky Barrett
Kildonan	Dave Chomiak; 5,123 (70.13%)	Garreth McDonald; 1,100 (15.06%)	Michael Lazar; 942 (12.90%)	Frank Luschak; 140 (1.92%)		Dave Chomiak
Point Douglas	George Hickes; 2,877 (74.86%)	Wyatt McIntyre; 337 (8.77%)	Mary Lou Bourgeois; 547 (14.23%)		Darrell Rankin (Communist); 82 (2.14%)	George Hickes
St. Johns	Gord Mackintosh; 4,224 (72.40%)	Ray Garnett; 612 (10.49%)	Ed Kolodziej; 745 (12.77%)	Alon Weinberg; 221 (3.79%)	Chris Buors (Libertarian); 32 (0.55%)	Gord Mackintosh
The Maples	Cris Aglugub; 3,781 (68.12%)	Tammy Witko; 885 (15.94%)	Angelina Olivier-Job; 885 (15.94%)			Cris Aglugub†
Wellington	Conrad Santos; 3,119 (73.96%)	Jon Penner; 413 (9.79%)	Rylan Reed; 640 (15.18%)		Glen Wreggitt (Communist); 45 (1.07%)	Conrad Santos

==== Northeast Winnipeg ====
Electoral district	Candidates					Incumbent
Electoral district	NDP	PC	Liberal	Green	Other	Incumbent
Concordia	Gary Doer; 4,450 (76.67%)	Conor Lloyd; 935 (16.11%)	Tanya Parks; 419 (7.22%)			Gary Doer
Elmwood	Jim Maloway; 3,954 (65.92%)	Bryan McLeod; 1,229 (20.49%)	Walt Roberts; 748 (12.47%)		Gavin Whittaker (Libertarian); 67 (1.12%)	Jim Maloway
Radisson	Bidhu Jha; 3,888 (52.45%)	Linda West; 2,901 (39.13%)	Murray Cliff; 624 (8.42%)			Bidhu Jha
River East	Doug Longstaffe; 4,402 (45.75%)	Bonnie Mitchelson; 4,935 (51.28%)	Fred Curry; 286 (2.97%)			Bonnie Mitchelson
Rossmere	Harry Schellenberg; 5,057 (65.55%)	Virginia Larsson; 2,296 (29.76%)	Sam Bhalesar; 362 (4.69%)			Harry Schellenberg†
St. Boniface	Greg Selinger; 4,904 (74.34%)	Dan Zahari; 741 (11.23%)	Dougald Lamont; 952 (14.43%)			Greg Selinger
Transcona	Daryl Reid; 4,414 (69.48%)	Nansy Marsiglia; 915 (14.40%)	Betty Ann Watts; 1,024 (16.12%)			Daryl Reid

==== West Winnipeg ====
Electoral district	Candidates					Incumbent
Electoral district	NDP	PC	Liberal	Green	Other	Incumbent
Assiniboia	Jim Rondeau; 5,147 (63.05%)	Dennis Wishanski; 2,257 (27.65%)	Monique Graboski; 657 (8.05%)	Jessie Tottle; 102 (1.25%)		Jim Rondeau
Charleswood	Mel Willis; 1,436 (17.52%)	Myrna Driedger; 3,961 (48.32%)	Rick Ross; 2,800 (34.16%)			Myrna Driedger
Kirkfield Park	Dennis Kshyk; 2,855 (31.06%)	Stuart Murray; 4,294 (46.72%)	Brian Head; 2,042 (22.22%)			Stuart Murray
St. James	Bonnie Korzeniowski; 3,982 (53.68%)	Cliff Allbutt; 2,473 (33.34%)	Alana McKenzie; 963 (12.98%)			Bonnie Korzeniowski
Tuxedo	Sonia Taylor; 2,023 (25.36%)	Heather Stefanson; 4,213 (52.81%)	Marla Billinghurst; 1,741 (21.83%)			Heather Stefanson

==== Central Winnipeg ====
Electoral district	Candidates					Incumbent
Electoral district	NDP	PC	Liberal	Green	Other	Incumbent
Fort Rouge	Tim Sale; 4,118 (57.64%)	Mark Francis; 1,409 (19.72%)	David Henteleff; 1,212 (16.96%)	Mikel Magnusson; 355 (4.97%)	Jim Weidman (Libertarian); 51 (0.71%)	Tim Sale†
Lord Roberts	Diane McGifford; 4,352 (61.99%)	Andrew Hymers; 1,179 (16.79%)	Ali Lamont; 982 (13.99%)	Vere Scott; 442 (6.29%)	Andy Caisse (Libertarian); 66 (0.94%)	Diane McGifford
Minto	MaryAnn Mihychuk; 3,586 (69.47%)	David Laurence; 626 (12.13%)	Mario Javier; 685 (13.27%)	Joan Johannson; 197 (3.81%)	Cheryl-Anne Carr (Communist); 68 (1.32%)	MaryAnn Mihychuk
River Heights	Kristin Bingeman; 1,824 (19.74%)	Mike Radcliffe; 2,675 (28.95%)	Jon Gerrard; 4,500 (48.70%)	Linda Goosen; 209 (2.26%)	Clancy Smith (Libertarian); 32 (0.35%)	Jon Gerrard
Wolseley	Rob Altemeyer; 3,482 (56.90%)	Ashley Burner; 679 (11.09%)	Val Mollison; 766 (12.52%)	Markus Buchart; 1,193 (19.49%)		Jean Friesen

==== South Winnipeg ====
Electoral district	Candidates					Incumbent
Electoral district	NDP	PC	Liberal	Green	Other	Incumbent
Fort Garry	Kerri Irvin-Ross; 3,852 (46.75%)	Joy Smith; 3,765 (45.69%)	Taran Malik; 562 (6.82%)		Didz Zuzens (Independent); 61 (1.12%)	Joy Smith
Fort Whyte	Janine Ballingall Scotten; 2,647 (28.13%)	John Loewen; 4,960 (52.71%)	Gerry Sankar; 1,803 (19.16%)			John Loewen
Riel	Christine Melnick; 4,455 (54.03%)	Shirley Render; 3,119 (37.83%)	Kristopher Ade; 671 (8.14%)			Linda Asper
Seine River	Theresa Oswald; 4,314 (51.06%)	Louise Dacquay; 3,582 (42.40%)	Luciano Vacca; 553 (6.54%)			Louise Dacquay
Southdale	Carolyn Frost; 3,123 (36.04%)	Jack Reimer; 4,422 (51.03%)	Chuck Mrena; 1,120 (12.93%)			Jack Reimer
St. Norbert	Marilyn Brick; 3,355 (48.68%)	Marcel Laurendeau; 2,610 (37.87%)	Jocelyn Greenwood; 741 (10.75%)	Keith Barber; 186 (2.70%)		Marcel Laurendeau
St. Vital	Nancy Allan; 4,409 (63.43%)	Kirsty Reilly; 1,656 (23.82%)	Justin Beaudry; 707 (10.17%)	Nelson Morrison; 179 (2.58%)		Nancy Allan

=== Synopsis of results ===
2003 Manitoba general election – synopsis of riding results
Electoral division	Winning party							Votes (Note: All parties with more than 1% of the vote are shown individually. Independent candidates and other minor parties are aggregated separately.)					
Electoral division	1999	1st place	Votes	Share	Margin #	Margin %	2nd place	NDP	PC	Lib	Ind	Oth	Total
Arthur-Virden	PC	PC	4,135	53.81%	916	11.92%	NDP	3,219	4,135	331	–	–	7,685
Assiniboia	NDP	NDP	5,147	63.05%	2,890	35.40%	PC	5,147	2,257	657	–	102	8,163
Brandon East	NDP	NDP	3,870	62.04%	1,834	29.40%	PC	3,870	2,036	274	–	58	6,238
Brandon West	NDP	NDP	5,210	61.02%	2,228	26.10%	PC	5,210	2,982	346	–	–	8,538
Burrows	NDP	NDP	4,004	69.01%	2,752	47.43%	Lib	4,004	423	1,252	–	123	5,802
Carman	PC	PC	3,523	51.86%	1,698	25.00%	Lib	1,445	3,523	1,825	–	–	6,793
Charleswood	PC	PC	3,961	48.32%	1,161	14.16%	Lib	1,436	3,961	2,800	–	–	8,197
Concordia	NDP	NDP	4,450	76.67%	3,515	60.56%	PC	4,450	935	419	–	–	5,804
Dauphin-Roblin	NDP	NDP	4,602	54.27%	1,623	19.14%	PC	4,602	2,979	683	–	216	8,480
Elmwood	NDP	NDP	3,954	65.92%	2,725	45.43%	PC	3,954	1,229	748	–	67	5,998
Emerson	PC	PC	3,509	59.41%	2,249	38.08%	Lib	1,137	3,509	1,260	–	–	5,906
Flin Flon	NDP	NDP	2,402	73.21%	1,845	56.23%	Lib	2,402	322	557	–	–	3,281
Fort Garry	PC	NDP	3,852	46.75%	87	1.06%	PC	3,852	3,765	562	61	–	8,240
Fort Rouge	NDP	NDP	4,118	57.63%	2,709	37.91%	PC	4,118	1,409	1,212	–	406	7,145
Fort Whyte	PC	PC	4,960	52.71%	2,313	24.58%	NDP	2,647	4,960	1,803	–	–	9,410
Gimli	PC	NDP	5,500	56.56%	1,849	19.01%	PC	5,500	3,651	574	–	–	9,725
Inkster	NDP	Liberal	3,671	53.39%	820	11.93%	NDP	2,851	251	3,671	–	103	6,876
Interlake	NDP	NDP	3,858	63.76%	2,062	34.08%	PC	3,858	1,796	397	–	–	6,051
Kildonan	NDP	NDP	5,123	70.13%	4,023	55.07%	PC	5,123	1,100	942	–	140	7,305
Kirkfield Park	PC	PC	4,294	46.72%	1,439	15.66%	NDP	2,855	4,294	2,042	–	–	9,191
La Vérendrye	NDP	NDP	3,881	58.07%	1,571	23.51%	PC	3,881	2,310	492	–	–	6,683
Lac du Bonnet	PC	PC	4,380	51.26%	505	5.91%	NDP	3,875	4,380	290	–	–	8,545
Lakeside	PC	PC	4,110	52.96%	1,095	14.11%	NDP	3,015	4,110	636	–	–	7,761
Lord Roberts	NDP	NDP	4,352	61.99%	3,173	45.19%	PC	4,352	1,179	982	–	508	7,021
Minnedosa	PC	PC	3,259	47.37%	12	0.17%	NDP	3,247	3,259	268	106	–	6,880
Minto	NDP	NDP	3,586	69.47%	2,901	56.20%	Lib	3,586	626	685	–	265	5,162
Morris	PC	PC	3,996	57.16%	2,408	34.44%	NDP	1,588	3,996	1,407	–	–	6,991
Pembina	PC	PC	4,694	76.24%	3,817	61.99%	NDP	877	4,694	505	–	81	6,157
Point Douglas	NDP	NDP	2,877	74.86%	2,330	60.63%	Lib	2,877	337	547	–	82	3,843
Portage la Prairie	PC	PC	3,524	49.82%	501	7.08%	NDP	3,023	3,524	527	–	–	7,074
Radisson	NDP	NDP	3,888	52.45%	987	13.31%	PC	3,888	2,901	624	–	–	7,413
Riel	NDP	NDP	4,455	54.03%	1,336	16.20%	PC	4,455	3,119	671	–	–	8,245
River East	PC	PC	4,935	51.28%	533	5.54%	NDP	4,402	4,935	286	–	–	9,623
River Heights	Liberal	Liberal	4,500	48.70%	1,825	19.75%	PC	1,824	2,675	4,500	–	241	9,240
Rossmere	NDP	NDP	5,057	65.55%	2,761	35.79%	PC	5,057	2,296	362	–	–	7,715
Rupertsland	NDP	NDP	2,203	87.52%	2,041	81.09%	Lib	2,203	152	162	–	–	2,517
Russell	PC	PC	4,087	51.96%	879	11.17%	NDP	3,208	4,087	571	–	–	7,866
Seine River	PC	NDP	4,314	51.06%	732	8.66%	PC	4,314	3,582	553	–	–	8,449
Selkirk	NDP	NDP	4,580	62.69%	3,111	42.58%	Lib	4,580	1,257	1,469	–	–	7,306
Southdale	PC	PC	4,422	51.03%	1,299	14.99%	NDP	3,123	4,422	1,120	–	–	8,665
Springfield	PC	PC	4,917	60.62%	2,405	29.65%	NDP	2,512	4,917	682	–	–	8,111
St. Boniface	NDP	NDP	4,904	74.34%	3,952	59.91%	Lib	4,904	741	952	–	–	6,597
St. James	NDP	NDP	3,982	53.68%	1,509	20.34%	PC	3,982	2,473	963	–	–	7,418
St. Johns	NDP	NDP	4,224	72.40%	3,479	59.63%	Lib	4,224	612	745	–	253	5,834
St. Norbert	PC	NDP	3,355	48.68%	745	10.81%	PC	3,355	2,610	741	–	186	6,892
St. Vital	NDP	NDP	4,409	63.43%	2,753	39.61%	PC	4,409	1,656	707	–	179	6,951
Ste. Rose	PC	PC	3,709	56.64%	1,408	21.50%	NDP	2,301	3,709	538	–	–	6,548
Steinbach	PC	PC	4,284	74.63%	3,409	59.39%	NDP	875	4,284	455	–	126	5,740
Swan River	NDP	NDP	4,816	63.24%	2,564	33.67%	PC	4,816	2,252	547	–	–	7,615
The Maples	NDP	NDP	3,781	81.03%	2,896	62.07%	PC	3,781	885	–	–	–	4,666
The Pas	NDP	NDP	3,104	65.61%	2,268	47.94%	Lib	3,104	791	836	–	–	4,731
Thompson	NDP	NDP	3,291	82.73%	2,759	69.36%	PC	3,291	532	155	–	–	3,978
Transcona	NDP	NDP	4,414	69.48%	3,390	53.36%	Lib	4,414	915	1,024	–	–	6,353
Turtle Mountain	PC	PC	3,956	60.01%	2,063	31.30%	NDP	1,893	3,956	743	–	–	6,592
Tuxedo	PC	PC	4,213	52.81%	2,190	27.45%	NDP	2,023	4,213	1,741	–	–	7,977
Wellington	NDP	NDP	3,119	73.96%	2,479	58.79%	Lib	3,119	413	640	–	45	4,217
Wolseley	NDP	NDP	3,482	56.90%	2,289	37.40%	Grn	3,482	679	766	–	1,193	6,120

= open seat
= winning candidate was in previous Legislature
= incumbent had switched allegiance
= previously incumbent in another riding
= incumbency arose from a byelection gain
= not incumbent; was previously elected to the Legislature
= other incumbents renominated
= previously an MP in the House of Commons of Canada
= multiple candidates

=== Turnout, winning shares and swings ===
Summary of riding results by turnout, vote share for winning candidate, and swing (vs 1999)
Riding and winning party			Turnout		Vote share (Note: Share won by winning candidate, with difference noted from share achieved by the same party in 1986.)		Swing (Note: Positive indicates improvement to standing of party winning in 1986; negative points to 1986's second-place party being swung to.)	
Riding and winning party			%	Change (pp)	%	Change (pp)	To	Change (pp)
Arthur-Virden	PC	Hold	60.40	-4.17	53.81	4.56	NDP	-0.77
Assiniboia	NDP	Hold	59.87	-12.49	63.05	18.82	NDP	17.69
Brandon East	NDP	Hold	52.66	-11.69	62.04	0.76	PC	-2.77
Brandon West	NDP	Hold	60.43	-12.7	61.02	11.76	NDP	11.28
Burrows	NDP	Hold	50.13	-15.51	69.01	2.67	NDP	2.45
Carman	PC	Hold	54.14	-6.33	51.86	2.61	PC	3.13
Charleswood	PC	Hold	60.25	-13.62	48.32	-6.4	Liberal	-8.59
Concordia	NDP	Hold	46.50	-17.8	76.67	6.59	NDP	6.92
Dauphin-Roblin	NDP	Hold	62.22	-10.39	54.27	-1.4	NDP	1.64
Elmwood	NDP	Hold	47.98	-16.26	65.92	3.06	NDP	7.43
Emerson	PC	Hold	48.54	-13.7	59.41	5.29	PC	5.9
Flin Flon	NDP	Hold	39.17	-12.43	73.21	8.3	NDP	13.92
Fort Garry	NDP	Gain	63.49	-11.6	46.75	3.13	NDP	-0.68
Fort Rouge	NDP	Hold	54.65	-15.23	57.63	8.95	NDP	9.81
Fort Whyte	PC	Hold	56.61	-19.81	52.71	-9.02	NDP	-5.17
Gimli	NDP	Gain	61.72	-16.22	56.56	12.68	NDP	-11.24
Inkster	Lib	Gain	61.36	-10.93	53.39	10.75	Liberal	-6.87
Interlake	NDP	Hold	49.90	-13.09	63.76	15.17	NDP	13.54
Kildonan	NDP	Hold	53.31	-17.54	70.13	7.47	NDP	9.26
Kirkfield Park	PC	Hold	61.44	-15.24	46.72	-6.51	NDP	-5.45
La Verendrye	NDP	Hold	52.54	-15.88	58.07	16.88	NDP	10.79
Lac du Bonnet	PC	Hold	60.52	-5.84	51.26	0.48	PC	2.17
Lakeside	PC	Hold	56.39	-11.6	52.96	4.21	NDP	-1.98
Lord Roberts	NDP	Hold	53.69	-15.33	61.99	8.68	NDP	9.56
Minnedosa	PC	Hold	56.15	-6.73	47.37	-2.34	NDP	-5.91
Minto	NDP	Hold	47.25	-16.84	69.47	5.55	NDP	11.06
Morris	PC	Hold	52.56	-14.56	57.16	3.78	PC	4.27
Pembina	PC	Hold	43.10	-9.45	76.24	7.23	PC	4.53
Point Douglas	NDP	Hold	40.24	-18.84	74.86	21.52	NDP	14.32
Portage la Prairie	PC	Hold	57.05	-2.72	49.82	3.3	NDP	-1.19
Radisson	NDP	Hold	54.05	-17.04	52.45	-2.57	PC	-4.37
Riel	NDP	Hold	61.15	-15.19	54.03	7.12	NDP	6.77
River East	PC	Hold	68.01	-9.29	51.28	1.03	NDP	-0.71
River Heights	Lib	Hold	67.43	-16.24	48.70	3.7	Liberal	7.85
Rossmere	NDP	Hold	58.22	-21.25	65.55	16.34	NDP	16.47
Rupertsland	NDP	Hold	28.12	-10.61	87.52	28.37	NDP	21.4
Russell	PC	Hold	63.35	-1.86	51.96	-1.67	PC	1.96
Seine River	NDP	Gain	59.35	-14.78	51.06	15.6	NDP	-10.58
Selkirk	NDP	Hold	54.50	-18.88	62.69	8.34	NDP	12.52
Southdale	PC	Hold	55.96	-18.57	51.03	-0.29	NDP	-4.48
Springfield	PC	Hold	55.79	-21.32	60.62	10.94	PC	10.27
St. Boniface	NDP	Hold	52.19	-22.35	74.34	17.76	NDP	17.24
St. James	NDP	Hold	55.51	-16.53	53.68	8.64	NDP	6.97
St. Johns	NDP	Hold	47.72	-17.38	72.40	0.4	NDP	5.16
St. Norbert	NDP	Gain	58.16	-14.51	48.68	9.76	NDP	-9.15
St. Vital	NDP	Hold	52.16	-21.87	63.43	12.29	NDP	12.36
Ste. Rose	PC	Hold	52.72	-9.23	56.64	6.73	PC	7.02
Steinbach	PC	Hold	41.99	-15.52	74.63	-3.49	NDP	-3.14
Swan River	NDP	Hold	60.17	-10.79	63.24	8.28	NDP	8.76
The Maples	NDP	Hold	49.11	-20.46	81.03	26.55	NDP	18.33
The Pas	NDP	Hold	40.46	-11.26	65.61	18.76	NDP	22.74
Thompson	NDP	Hold	37.54	-16.86	82.73	11.74	NDP	11.4
Transcona	NDP	Hold	48.54	-19.44	69.48	5.6	NDP	9.29
Turtle Mountain	PC	Hold	54.86	-3.96	60.01	3.83	PC	0.79
Tuxedo	PC	Hold	56.31	-15.52	52.81	-7.91	NDP	-4.73
Wellington	NDP	Hold	44.47	-14.39	73.96	4.68	NDP	5.34
Wolseley	NDP	Hold	53.14	-13.52	56.90	-13.95	PC	-1.22

=== Changes in party shares ===
Share change analysis by party and riding (2003 vs 1999)
Riding	Liberal		NDP		PC	
Riding	%	Change (pp)	%	Change (pp)	%	Change (pp)
Arthur-Virden	4.31	-10.66	41.89	6.1	53.81	4.56
Assiniboia	8.05	-3.51	63.05	18.82	27.65	-16.56
Brandon East	4.39	-1.34	62.04	0.76	32.64	6.3
Brandon West	4.05	-0.04	61.02	11.76	34.93	-10.79
Burrows	21.58	-2.23	69.01	2.67	7.29	-2.03
Carman	26.87	-3.65	21.27	1.04	51.86	2.61
Charleswood	34.16	10.78	17.52	-4.38	48.32	-6.4
Concordia	7.22	1.75	76.67	6.59	16.11	-7.26
Dauphin-Roblin	8.05	8.05	54.27	-1.4	35.13	-4.67
Elmwood	12.47	12.47	65.92	3.06	20.49	-11.8
Emerson	21.33	-6.5	19.25	1.2	59.41	5.29
Flin Flon	16.98	16.98	73.21	8.3	9.81	-19.53
Fort Garry	6.82	-4.5	46.75	3.13	45.69	1.78
Fort Rouge	16.96	-2.17	57.63	8.95	19.72	-10.67
Fort Whyte	19.16	7.71	28.13	1.31	52.71	-9.02
Gimli	5.90	-2.89	56.56	12.68	37.54	-9.8
Inkster	53.39	10.75	41.46	-2.99	3.65	-9.26
Interlake	6.56	-3.26	63.76	15.17	29.68	-11.91
Kildonan	12.90	1.67	70.13	7.47	15.06	-11.05
Kirkfield Park	22.22	2.12	31.06	4.39	46.72	-6.51
La Verendrye	7.36	-9.72	58.07	16.88	34.57	-4.7
Lac du Bonnet	3.39	3.39	45.35	-3.87	51.26	0.48
Lakeside	8.19	-9.93	38.85	8.17	52.96	4.21
Lord Roberts	13.99	-4.08	61.99	8.68	16.79	-10.45
Minnedosa	3.90	-3.78	47.19	9.48	47.37	-2.34
Minto	13.27	6.9	69.47	5.55	12.13	-16.56
Morris	20.13	-4.76	22.71	2.2	57.16	3.78
Pembina	8.20	-6.71	14.24	-1.83	76.24	7.23
Point Douglas	14.23	-7.12	74.86	21.52	8.77	-10.79
Portage la Prairie	7.45	-7.49	42.73	5.68	49.82	3.3
Radisson	8.42	-3.61	52.45	-2.57	39.13	6.17
Riel	8.14	0.18	54.03	7.12	37.83	-6.42
River East	2.97	-3.47	45.74	2.44	51.28	1.03
River Heights	48.70	3.7	19.74	6.76	28.95	-12
Rossmere	4.69	0.87	65.55	16.34	29.76	-16.61
Rupertsland	6.44	-14.43	87.52	28.37	6.04	-13.94
Russell	7.26	7.26	40.78	-5.59	51.96	-1.67
Seine River	6.55	-8.74	51.06	15.6	42.40	-5.55
Selkirk	20.11	8.36	62.69	8.34	17.21	-16.69
Southdale	12.93	-6.49	36.04	8.67	51.03	-0.29
Springfield	8.41	0.7	30.97	-9.61	60.62	10.94
St. Boniface	14.43	-16.71	74.34	17.76	11.23	-1.05
St. James	12.98	-3.34	53.68	8.64	33.34	-5.29
St. Johns	12.77	5.19	72.40	0.4	10.49	-9.93
St. Norbert	10.75	-3.92	48.68	9.76	37.87	-8.54
St. Vital	10.17	-0.6	63.43	12.29	23.82	-12.43
Ste. Rose	8.22	0.6	35.14	-7.32	56.64	6.73
Steinbach	7.93	-1.49	15.24	2.79	74.63	-3.49
Swan River	7.18	7.18	63.24	8.28	29.57	-9.24
The Maples	0.00	-15.52	81.03	26.55	18.97	-10.11
The Pas	17.67	7.96	65.61	18.76	16.72	-26.72
Thompson	3.90	-0.67	82.73	11.74	13.37	-11.07
Transcona	16.12	8.01	69.48	5.6	14.40	-12.98
Turtle Mountain	11.27	-6.08	28.72	2.25	60.01	3.83
Tuxedo	21.83	7.63	25.36	1.56	52.81	-7.91
Wellington	15.18	2.39	73.96	4.68	9.79	-6
Wolseley	12.52	12.52	56.90	-13.95	11.09	-11.5

== Post-election changes ==
- MaryAnn Mihychuk (Minto) resigned her seat on May 21, 2004 to campaign for Mayor of Winnipeg. A by-election was held on June 22, 2004 to determine her successor.

Manitoba provincial by-election, June 22, 2004: Minto Resignation of MaryAnn Mihychuk
Party	Candidate	Votes	%	Expenditures
New Democratic	Andrew Swan	2,848	54.69	$14,208.77
Liberal	Wayne Helgason	1,616	31.03	$9,826.24
Progressive Conservative	David Laurence	631	12.12	$41.20
Communist	Cheryl-Anne Carr	113	2.17	$0.00
Total valid votes		5,208	99.17	
Rejected ballots		43	0.83	
Turnout		5,251	47.18	
Registered voters		11,129		

- Merv Tweed (Turtle Mountain) resigned his seat to campaign for the House of Commons of Canada. A by-election was held on July 2, 2004 to determine his successor.

Manitoba provincial by-election, July 2, 2004: Turtle Mountain Resignation of Merv Tweed
Party	Candidate	Votes	%	±%	Expenditures
Progressive Conservative	Cliff Cullen	3,632	63.01	3.00	$11,273.31
Liberal	Bev Leadbeater	1,084	18.81	7.54	$2,256.63
New Democratic	Betty Storie	1,048	18.18	-10.53	$12,037.72
Total valid votes		5,764	–	–	
Rejected		12	–		
Eligible voters / turnout		12,267	47.10	–	
Source(s) Source:

- John Loewen (Fort Whyte) resigned his seat on September 26, 2005 to campaign for the House of Commons of Canada. A by-election was held on December 16, 2005, to determine his successor.

Manitoba provincial by-election, December 16, 2005: Fort Whyte Resignation of John Loewen
Party	Candidate	Votes	%	±%	Expenditures
Progressive Conservative	Hugh McFadyen	3,542	52.26	−0.45	$27,219.00
New Democratic	Christina McDonald	1,650	24.34	−3.79	$18,333.89
Liberal	Jean Paterson	1,466	21.63	+2.47	$6,134.47
Green	Shelagh Pizey-Allen	120	1.77	–	$233.71
Total valid votes		6,778	99.91		
Rejected ballots		6	0.09	-0.17	
Turnout		6,784	38.07	−18.54	
Registered voters		17,820			
Progressive Conservative hold		Swing		+1.67	

== See also ==
- Independent candidates, 2003 Manitoba provincial election
