= Fort Rouge (electoral district) =

Provincial electoral district in Manitoba, Canada

Coordinates: 49.873°N 97.147°W

Manitoba electoral district
- Location in Winnipeg

Provincial electoral district
- Legislature: Legislative Assembly of Manitoba
MLA
Wab Kinew
New Democratic
- District created: 1957
- First contested: 1958
- Last contested: 2023

Fort Rouge (French: Fort-Rouge) is a provincial electoral district of Manitoba, Canada. It was created by redistribution in 1957, and formally came into existence in the general election of 1958. The riding was eliminated in 1989, and re-established in 1999. It is located in the central section of the city of Winnipeg.

Fort Rouge is bordered on the east by St. Boniface, to the south by Fort Garry-Riverview, to the north by Logan, and to the west by River Heights. The actual Legislative Assembly of Manitoba building is located across the river from Fort Rouge.

The riding's population in 1996 was 20,364. In 1999, the average family income was $49,361, and the unemployment rate was 8.70%. 39.6% of Fort Rouge's residents are listed as low-income, the sixth-highest rate in the province. Almost 80% of occupied dwelling are rentals, and over 20% of households are single-parent families. Almost 25% of Fort Rouge's residents have a university degree—one of the highest rates in the province.

Fort Rouge has an immigrant population of 20%. Eight per cent of the riding's residents are aboriginal. The service sector accounts for 21% of Fort Rouge's industry, with a further 11% in social services.

The seat was held by the Progressive Conservatives from 1958 to 1973, and was a rare bastion of Liberal strength in the province from 1973 to 1981. Lloyd Axworthy was the riding's representative from 1973 to 1979; for a time, he was the only Liberal in the legislature. Roland Penner's election for the New Democratic Party in 1981, however, foretold of future NDP successes in the riding. Though Jim Carr would win the riding back for the Liberals in 1988, the seat would be broken into Crescentwood, Broadway and Osborne for the 1990 election. By the time the seat was reestablished in 1999, Crescentwood, Broadway and Osborne would all have NDP representatives, with Crescentwood MLA Tim Sale becoming the first MLA of the reestablished Fort Rouge. It has been continuously represented by the NDP since the riding was reestablished in 1999.

In the 2007, 2011, and 2016 provincial elections the Liberals were the main challengers to the NDP, though the party would continue to hold the seat with Jennifer Howard. In 2016, Liberal leader Rana Bokhari ran in Fort Rouge, losing to the NDP's Wab Kinew. At the 2015 federal election, according to Elections Canada data, Fort Rouge voted heavily Liberal. In the 2019 and 2023 elections, the Progressive Conservatives finished second behind the NDP, with the Liberals falling behind Green candidate James Beddome in 2019.

The district is represented by NDP leader and Premier Wab Kinew.

== Members of the Legislative Assembly ==
Assembly	Years	Member	Party
Riding created from Winnipeg South
25th	1958–1959	Gurney Evans	Progressive Conservative
26th	1959–1962	Gurney Evans	Progressive Conservative
27th	1962–1966	Gurney Evans	Progressive Conservative
28th	1966–1969	Gurney Evans	Progressive Conservative
29th	1969–1973	Inez Trueman	Progressive Conservative
30th	1973–1977	Lloyd Axworthy	Liberal
31st	1977–1979	Lloyd Axworthy	Liberal
31st	1979–1981	June Westbury	Liberal
32nd	1981–1986	Roland Penner	New Democratic
33rd	1986–1988	Roland Penner	New Democratic
34th	1988–1990	Jim Carr	Liberal
Riding dissolved into Broadway, Crescentwood and Osborne
Riding re-created from Broadway, Crescentwood and Osborne
37th	1999–2003	Tim Sale	New Democratic
38th	2003–2007	Tim Sale	New Democratic
39th	2007–2011	Jennifer Howard	New Democratic
40th	2011–2016	Jennifer Howard	New Democratic
41st	2016–2019	Wab Kinew	New Democratic
42nd	2019–2023	Wab Kinew	New Democratic
43rd	2023–present	Wab Kinew	New Democratic

== Election results ==
=== 1958 ===
1958 Manitoba general election
Party	Candidate	Votes	%
Progressive Conservative	Gurney Evans	3,647	54.83
Liberal–Progressive	James Edward "Jimmy" Wilson	1,862	27.99
Co-operative Commonwealth	Ernest Draffin	1,143	17.18
Total valid votes		6,652	–
Rejected		26	–
Eligible voters / Turnout		12,010	55.60
Source(s) Source: Manitoba. Chief Electoral Officer (1999). Statement of Votes for the 37th Provincial General Election, September 21, 1999 (PDF) (Report). Winnipeg: Elections Manitoba.

=== 1959 ===
1959 Manitoba general election
Party	Candidate	Votes	%	±%
Progressive Conservative	Gurney Evans	4,352	56.34	1.52
Liberal–Progressive	Jerry Marrin	1,947	25.21	−2.78
Co-operative Commonwealth	Robert C. Murdoch	1,425	18.45	1.27
Total valid votes		7,724	–	–
Rejected		55	–	
Eligible voters / Turnout		12,183	63.85	8.25
Source(s) Source: Manitoba. Chief Electoral Officer (1999). Statement of Votes for the 37th Provincial General Election, September 21, 1999 (PDF) (Report). Winnipeg: Elections Manitoba.

=== 1962 ===
1962 Manitoba general election
Party	Candidate	Votes	%	±%
Progressive Conservative	Gurney Evans	3,507	52.94	−3.41
Liberal	Brock McArthur	2,128	32.12	6.91
New Democratic	William R. Reid	990	14.94	−3.51
Total valid votes		6,625	–	–
Rejected		76	–	
Eligible voters / Turnout		11,989	55.89	−7.96
Source(s) Source: Manitoba. Chief Electoral Officer (1999). Statement of Votes for the 37th Provincial General Election, September 21, 1999 (PDF) (Report). Winnipeg: Elections Manitoba.

=== 1966 ===
1966 Manitoba general election
Party	Candidate	Votes	%	±%
Progressive Conservative	Gurney Evans	3,767	46.72	−6.22
Liberal	Francis C. Muldoon	2,451	30.40	−1.72
New Democratic	Len Green	1,845	22.88	7.94
Total valid votes		8,063	–	–
Rejected		22	–	
Eligible voters / Turnout		13,105	61.69	5.80
Source(s) Source: Manitoba. Chief Electoral Officer (1999). Statement of Votes for the 37th Provincial General Election, September 21, 1999 (PDF) (Report). Winnipeg: Elections Manitoba.

=== 1969 ===
1969 Manitoba general election
Party	Candidate	Votes	%	±%
Progressive Conservative	Inez Trueman	2,750	38.53	−8.19
New Democratic	Una Decter	2,446	34.27	11.39
Liberal	Jane Sayler Heffelfinger	1,941	27.20	−3.20
Total valid votes		7,137	–	–
Rejected		51	–	
Eligible voters / Turnout		12,328	58.31	−3.39
Source(s) Source: Manitoba. Chief Electoral Officer (1999). Statement of Votes for the 37th Provincial General Election, September 21, 1999 (PDF) (Report). Winnipeg: Elections Manitoba.

=== 1973 ===
1973 Manitoba general election
Party	Candidate	Votes	%	±%
Liberal	Lloyd Axworthy	4,181	36.49	9.30
New Democratic	Samia Friesen	3,614	31.54	−2.73
Progressive Conservative	Inez Trueman	3,531	30.82	−7.71
Independent	Lane McDonald	131	1.14	–
Total valid votes		11,457	–	–
Rejected		79	–	
Eligible voters / Turnout		14,340	80.45	22.14
Source(s) Source: Manitoba. Chief Electoral Officer (1999). Statement of Votes for the 37th Provincial General Election, September 21, 1999 (PDF) (Report). Winnipeg: Elections Manitoba.

=== 1977 ===
1977 Manitoba general election
Party	Candidate	Votes	%	±%
Liberal	Lloyd Axworthy	4,153	39.54	3.05
Progressive Conservative	Julian Hugh McDonald	3,486	33.19	2.37
New Democratic	Ermano Barone	2,863	27.26	−4.28
Total valid votes		10,502	–	–
Rejected		55	–	
Eligible voters / Turnout		14,272	73.97	−6.48
Source(s) Source: Manitoba. Chief Electoral Officer (1999). Statement of Votes for the 37th Provincial General Election, September 21, 1999 (PDF) (Report). Winnipeg: Elections Manitoba.

=== 1979 by-election ===
Manitoba provincial by-election, October 16, 1979 Resignation of Lloyd Axworthy
Party	Candidate	Votes	%	±%
Liberal	June Westbury	2,659	39.22	−0.33
New Democratic	Victor Steven "Vic" Savino	2,291	33.79	6.53
Progressive Conservative	Julian Hugh McDonald	1,830	26.99	−6.20
Total valid votes		6,780	–	–
Rejected		N/A	–	
Eligible voters / Turnout		N/A	–	–
Source(s) Source: Manitoba. Chief Electoral Officer (1999). Statement of Votes for the 37th Provincial General Election, September 21, 1999 (PDF) (Report). Winnipeg: Elections Manitoba.

=== 1981 ===
1981 Manitoba general election
Party	Candidate	Votes	%	±%
New Democratic	Roland Penner	4,342	44.57	10.77
Progressive Conservative	Perry Schulman	2,843	29.18	2.19
Liberal	June Westbury	2,415	24.79	−14.43
Progressive	Bud Boyce	143	1.47	–
Total valid votes		9,743	–	–
Rejected		77	–	
Eligible voters / Turnout		13,671	71.83	–
Source(s) Source: Manitoba. Chief Electoral Officer (1999). Statement of Votes for the 37th Provincial General Election, September 21, 1999 (PDF) (Report). Winnipeg: Elections Manitoba.

=== 1986 ===
1986 Manitoba general election
Party	Candidate	Votes	%	±%
New Democratic	Roland Penner	4,223	48.86	4.30
Progressive Conservative	Robert P. Haier	2,590	29.97	0.79
Liberal	Lionel Ditz	1,683	19.47	−5.31
Libertarian	Clancy Smith	101	1.17	–
Communist	Nigel Hanrahan	46	0.53	–
Total valid votes		8,643	–	–
Rejected		53	–	
Eligible voters / Turnout		13,517	64.33	−7.50
Source(s) Source: Manitoba. Chief Electoral Officer (1999). Statement of Votes for the 37th Provincial General Election, September 21, 1999 (PDF) (Report). Winnipeg: Elections Manitoba.

=== 1988 ===
1988 Manitoba general election
Party	Candidate	Votes	%	±%
Liberal	Jim Carr	5,127	48.91	29.44
New Democratic	Roland Penner	2,912	27.78	-21.08
Progressive Conservative	Robert Haier	2,303	21.97	-8.00
Progressive	Gordon Pratt	75	0.72	–
Libertarian	Dennis Owens	66	0.63	-0.54
Total valid votes		10,483	–	–
Rejected		50	–	
Eligible voters / turnout		15,057	69.95	5.62
Liberal gain from New Democratic		Swing		+25.22
Source(s) Source: Manitoba. Chief Electoral Officer (1999). Statement of Votes for the 37th Provincial General Election, September 21, 1999 (PDF) (Report). Winnipeg: Elections Manitoba.

=== 1999 ===
1999 Manitoba general election
Party	Candidate	Votes	%	Expenditures
New Democratic	Tim Sale	4,759	48.68	$25,152.00
Progressive Conservative	Ron Paley	2,971	30.39	$26,322.65
Liberal	John Shanski	1,870	19.13	$24,461.96
Green	Alex Reid	176	1.80	$256.65
Total valid votes		9,776	–	
Rejected		52	–	
Eligible voters / turnout		14,064	69.88	
Source(s) Source: Manitoba. Chief Electoral Officer (1999). Statement of Votes for the 37th Provincial General Election, September 21, 1999 (PDF) (Report). Winnipeg: Elections Manitoba.

=== 2003 ===
2003 Manitoba general election
Party	Candidate	Votes	%	±%	Expenditures
New Democratic	Tim Sale	4,118	57.63	8.95	$16,724.33
Progressive Conservative	Mark Francis	1,409	19.72	−10.67	$8,860.98
Liberal	David Henteleff	1,212	16.96	−2.17	$4,299.83
Green	Mikel Magnusson	355	4.97	3.17	$48.24
Libertarian	Jim Weidman	51	0.71	–	$0.00
Total valid votes		7,145	–	–	
Rejected		59	–		
Eligible voters / turnout		13,182	54.65	−15.23	
Source(s) Source: Manitoba. Chief Electoral Officer (2003). Statement of Votes for the 38th Provincial General Election, June 3, 2003 (PDF) (Report). Winnipeg: Elections Manitoba.

=== 2007 ===
2007 Manitoba general election
Party	Candidate	Votes	%	±%	Expenditures
New Democratic	Jennifer Howard	3,828	46.97	−10.67	$25.968.04
Liberal	Paul Hesse	2,488	30.53	13.56	$23,866.84
Progressive Conservative	Christine Waddell	1,202	14.75	−4.97	$11,369.89
Green	Gerald H. Enns	511	6.27	1.30	$905.51
Independent	Ron Nash	92	1.13	–	$261.98
Communist	Frank Komarniski	29	0.36	–	
Total valid votes		8,150	–	–	
Rejected		53	–		
Eligible voters / turnout		13,169	62.29	7.64	
Source(s) Source: Manitoba. Chief Electoral Officer (2007). Statement of Votes for the 39th Provincial General Election, May 22, 2007 (PDF) (Report). Winnipeg: Elections Manitoba.

=== 2011 ===
2011 Manitoba general election
Party	Candidate	Votes	%	±%	Expenditures
New Democratic	Jennifer Howard	4,501	51.26	4.29	$28,361.23
Liberal	Paul Hesse	2,031	23.13	−7.40	$31,673.03
Progressive Conservative	Sonny Dominique	1,770	20.16	5.41	$17,369.18
Green	Stephen Weedon	478	5.44	−0.83	$24.14
Total valid votes		8,780	–	–	
Rejected		54	–		
Eligible voters / turnout		14,429	61.22	−1.07	
Source(s) Source: Manitoba. Chief Electoral Officer (2011). Statement of Votes for the 40th Provincial General Election, October 4, 2011 (PDF) (Report). Winnipeg: Elections Manitoba. "Election Returns: 40th General Election". Elections Manitoba. 2011.

=== 2016 ===
2016 Manitoba general election
Party	Candidate	Votes	%	±%	Expenditures
New Democratic	Wab Kinew	3,360	37.63	−13.63	$39,199.49
Progressive Conservative	Audrey Gordon	2,571	28.80	8.64	$42,245.54
Liberal	Rana Bokhari	1,792	20.07	−3.06	$30,238.82
Green	Grant Sharp	983	11.01	5.57	$322.90
Manitoba	Matthew Ostrove	175	1.96	–	$945.26
Communist	Paula Ducharme	47	0.53	–	$33.67
Total valid votes / expense limit		8,928	–	–	$44,855.00
Rejected		125	–		
Eligible voters / turnout		13,896	65.15	3.92	
New Democratic hold		Swing		–11.04	
Source(s) Source: Manitoba. Chief Electoral Officer (2016). Statement of Votes for the 41st Provincial General Election, April 19, 2016 (PDF) (Report). Winnipeg: Elections Manitoba. "Election Returns: 41st General Election". Elections Manitoba. 2016.

=== 2019 ===
2019 Manitoba general election
Party	Candidate	Votes	%	±%	Expenditures
New Democratic	Wab Kinew	5,055	51.24	13.60	$23,922.64
Progressive Conservative	Edna Nabess	1,857	18.82	−9.97	$7,290.07
Green	James Beddome	1,580	16.01	5.00	$8,974.33
Liberal	Cyndy Friesen	1,290	13.08	−7.00	$8,223.63
Manitoba First	Michael McCracken	54	0.55	−1.41	$582.58
Manitoba Forward	Bradley Hebert	30	0.30	–	$0.00
Total valid votes		9,866	–	–	
Rejected		47	–		
Eligible voters / turnout		16,870	58.76	−6.39	
Source(s) Source: Manitoba. Chief Electoral Officer (2019). Statement of Votes for the 42nd Provincial General Election, September 10, 2019 (PDF) (Report). Winnipeg: Elections Manitoba. "Candidate Election Returns". Elections Manitoba. Elections Manitoba.

=== 2023 ===
2023 Manitoba general election
Party	Candidate	Votes	%	±%	Expenditures
New Democratic	Wab Kinew	6,761	70.57	+19.33	$23,088.15
Progressive Conservative	Rejeanne Caron	1,566	16.34	−2.48	$0.00
Liberal	Katherine Johnson	1,152	12.02	−1.05	$5,193.76
Communist	Robert Crooks	102	1.06	–	$106.40
Total valid votes/expense limit		9,581	99.59	–	$64,588.00
Total rejected and declined ballots		39	0.41	–	
Turnout		9,620	58.04	−0.73	
Eligible voters		16,576			
New Democratic hold		Swing		+10.90	
Source(s) Source: Elections Manitoba

== Previous boundaries ==
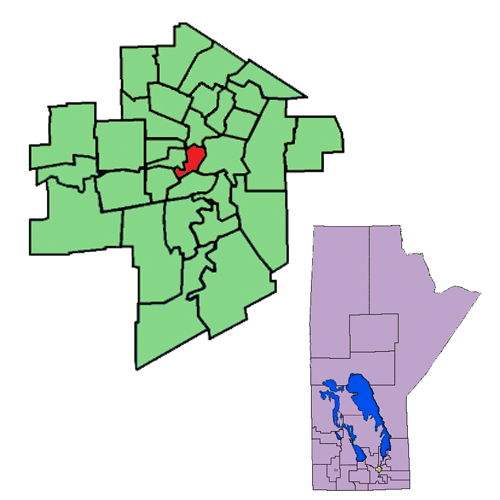
The 1999–2011 boundaries of the riding of Fort Rouge highlighted in red.

== See also ==
- List of Manitoba provincial electoral districts
- Canadian provincial electoral districts
