= Rob Altemeyer =

Canadian politician

Member of the Legislative Assembly of Manitoba for Wolseley
- In office June 3, 2003 – August 12, 2019
- Preceded by: Jean Friesen
- Succeeded by: Lisa Naylor

Personal details
- Born: Winnipeg, Manitoba
- Party: New Democratic Party
- Parent: Bob Altemeyer
- Education: University of Manitoba (BA) (MNRM)

Rob Altemeyer is a politician in Manitoba, Canada. He was a member of the Manitoba legislature from 2003 to 2019. Altemeyer has long been involved in social justice and environmental issues in the Winnipeg area. He was responsible for implementing a recycling program at the University of Manitoba, and was one of the founders of the Global Change Game (an internationally respected educational program) while still a student. Altemeyer served a two-year term on the Council of Canadians, and has taken part in a variety of activities in the fair trade/anti-globalization movement. In 1998, he organized an anti-globalization study group known as Beyond McWorld.

Altemeyer has also been involved in the Wolseley Neighbourhood Advisory Committee, which is involved in over two dozen local capital improvement projects. Prior to the 2003 provincial election, he served as an assistant to New Democratic Party of Manitoba (NDP) Cabinet Minister Tim Sale. In the 2003 general election, Altemeyer was elected to the provincial legislature as a New Democrat for the centre-Winnipeg riding of Wolseley. He received 3,482 votes, against 1,193 for his nearest competitor, Green Party leader Markus Buchart. He was re-elected in the 2007, 2011, and 2016 provincial elections. He did not run for re-election in 2019.

== Biography ==
Altemeyer was born and raised in Winnipeg, Manitoba, and was educated at the University of Manitoba where he received a Bachelor of Arts degree in Anthropology and a Master's Degree in Natural Resource Management. He also played college baseball for two years in North Dakota, on an athletic scholarship. Rob Altemeyer is the son of Canadian psychologist Bob Altemeyer.

== Electoral record ==
2016 Manitoba general election: Wolseley
Party	Candidate	Votes	%	±%	Expenditures
New Democratic	Rob Altemeyer	3,037	41.27	-19.46	$32,887.29
Green	David Nickarz	2,645	35.94	+16.30	$15,710.81
Progressive Conservative	Raquel Dancho	945	12.84	+0.64	$7,262.81
Liberal	Shandi Strong	653	8.87	+1.45	$3,844.07
Manitoba	Wayne Sturby	79	1.07		$1,094.12
Total valid votes/Expense limit		7,359	98.92		$39,244.00
Total rejected ballots		80	1.08	+0.29	
Turnout		7,439	63.26	+7.66	
Eligible voters		11,759			
New Democratic hold		Swing		-17.88	
Source: Elections Manitoba

2011 Manitoba general election: Wolseley
Party	Candidate	Votes	%	±%	Expenditures
New Democratic	Rob Altemeyer	4,229	60.72	−3.16	21,048.39
Green	James Beddome	1,368	19.64	+7.57	5,635.36
Progressive Conservative	Harpreet Turka	850	12.20	+0.89	8,750.53
Liberal	Eric Stewart	517	7.42	−4.02	5,479.79
Total valid votes		6,964	99.21		
Rejected and declined votes		55	0.78		
Turnout		7,019	55.60		
Registered voters		12,624			
Majority		2,861	25.68	41.08	
Source: Elections Manitoba

2007 Manitoba general election: Wolseley
Party	Candidate	Votes	%	±%	Expenditures
New Democratic	Rob Altemeyer	4,038	63.88	+6.98	$21,917.13
Green	Ardythe Basham	763	12.07	-7.42	$1,096.00
Liberal	Raven Thundersky	723	11.44	-1.08	$4,743.98
Progressive Conservative	Gustav Nelson	715	11.31	+0.22	$3,946.16
Communist	David Tymoshchuk	82	1.30		$373.87
Total valid votes		6,321	100.00		
Rejected and declined votes		53			
Turnout		6,374	55.28		
Registered voters		11,531			

2003 Manitoba general election: Wolseley
Party	Candidate	Votes	%	±%	Expenditures
New Democratic	Rob Altemeyer	3,482	56.90	-12.25	$20,948.83
Green	Markus Buchart	1,193	19.49	+14.83	$5,307.87
Liberal	Val Mollison	766	12.52		$4,591.54
Progressive Conservative	Ashley Burner	679	11.09	-10.97	$1,006.54
Total valid votes		6,120	100.00		
Rejected and declined votes		77			
Turnout		6,197	53.14		
Registered voters		11,662			
