= Green Party of Manitoba =

Provincial political party in Canada

- Abbreviation: GPM
- Leader: Janine Gibson
- President: Dennis Bayomi
- Deputy Leaders: Dennis Bayomi; Blair Mahaffy
- Founded: November 11, 1998; 27 years ago
- Headquarters: P.O. Box 26023, RPO Maryland Winnipeg, Manitoba R3G 3R3
- Membership (2025): ▼121
- Ideology: Green politics
- Political position: Centre-left
- Colours: Green
- Seats in Legislature: 0 / 57

Website
- greenparty.mb.ca

The Green Party of Manitoba (GPM; French: Parti vert du Manitoba) is a green provincial political party in Manitoba, Canada, founded on November 11, 1998. The party is legally autonomous from the Green Party of Canada, though for several years many of its members also belonged to the Green Party of Canada in Manitoba, a federal organization established in 1996 (the two organizations were separated in May 2005). The GPM has maintained a position as the fourth largest party in Manitoba since the 2003 election until the 2023 Manitoba general election, both in the number of votes received and candidates run.

== History ==
The GPM is not the first "Green Party" in Manitoba history. Nick Ternette, a political advocate for the left wing of the New Democratic Party (NDP), established a "Green Party" in Winnipeg in 1989, and fielded candidates under its banner in that year's municipal elections. Ternette opposed the party's centrist direction in the 1980s. His "Green Party" supported several progressive and environmental causes. None of its candidates were elected, and the party never ran candidates at the provincial level. Ternette is not affiliated with the GPM, although neither has he opposed it.

The current GPM was established by Winnipeg electoral reform activist Chris Billows in November 1998, with the assistance of the Green Party of Canada. Billows, Eymond Toupin, and future provincial leader Markus Buchart hosted the Green Party of Canada's national convention in Winnipeg in August 1998.

== Policies ==
The GPM's policies are progressive as the party is primarily focused on environmental issues, and promotes the conservation of land and non-renewable natural resources. It has expressed concern about "urban sprawl" in Winnipeg's suburbs, has called for reform in Manitoba's commercial hog sector, and generally supports the rights of small farming interests over corporations.

The GPM also favours liberal positions on social issues such as abortion and same-sex marriage, and promotes accessible public health care with emphasis on healthy lifestyles and illness prevention.

The party supports the extension of labour protection laws to farm-workers and a reduction of Manitoba's standard work week from 40 to 32 hours. It has also endorsed full employment, and has criticized Gary Doer's NDP government for not reversing welfare cutbacks enacted by the previous Tory government of Gary Filmon.

According to GPM's website, the party's Democratic Reform titled, "Encouraging Truth in Politics" was approved on January 17, 2025. The website states in a bulleted list that the party expects to expose political materials and politicians that have purposely caused false narratives.

=== 2016 platform ===
The GPM released its 2016 election platform, entitled "Building a Sustainable Manitoba", on April 5, 2016. The document included promises to introduce Guaranteed Annual Income to Manitoba, a $50/tonne carbon tax, fare-free transit, and oppose the Energy East pipeline, among other items.

=== 2025 platform ===
"Encouraging Truths in Politics" focuses on bringing forth the truth in the political realm of Canada. GPM's 2025 plan also includes the importance of verified information on media platforms and how it is vital that citizens are not shown falsely articulated material.

== Election results ==
General election	Leader	Candidates	Seats	+/-	%	Votes	Position	Parliamentary status
1999	Markus Buchart	6 / 57	0 / 57	Steady	0.20%	973	5th	Extra-parliamentary
2003	Markus Buchart	14 / 57	0 / 57	Steady	0.96%	3,792	▲4th	Extra-parliamentary
2007	Andrew Basham	15 / 57	0 / 57	Steady	1.34%	5,586	4th	Extra-parliamentary
2011	James Beddome	32 / 57	0 / 57	Steady	2.52%	10,886	4th	Extra-parliamentary
2016	James Beddome	31 / 57	0 / 57	Steady	5.22%	22,282	4th	Extra-parliamentary
2019	James Beddome	43 / 57	0 / 57	Steady	6.24%	27,450	4th	Extra-parliamentary
2023	Janine Gibson	13 / 57	0 / 57	Steady	0.80%	3,618	▼5th	Extra-parliamentary

The GPM ran six candidates in the provincial election of 1999, and scored its best result in the Winnipeg riding of Wolseley, where Phyllis Abbé, also a prominent former New Democrat, received 386 votes. Former party leader Markus Buchart ran against Premier Gary Filmon in the riding of Tuxedo, and received 126 votes. The party received 0.2% of all votes cast in the province.

The GPM ran fourteen candidates in the 2003 election. Buchart received 1193 votes (19.5%) in Wolseley, placing second against New Democrat Rob Altemeyer. The GPM as a whole received 4.08% of the vote in the ridings that it contested.

In the December 13, 2005, by-election held in the strongly conservative Fort Whyte constituency, GPM candidate Shelagh Pizey-Allen garnered 1.77% of the vote.

The GPM ran fifteen candidates in the 2007 election. The fifteen captured 1.33% of the vote, or 5.5% in the electoral divisions that were contested. The Green candidates received 12.32% in Wolseley placing second, 8.46% in Lord Roberts, 7.76% in St. Boniface, 6.38% in Fort Rouge, and third place in Minnedosa ahead of the Liberal Party of Manitoba.

In 2011, the GPM ran 32 candidates across the province and took 2.52% of the vote province-wide, or 10,886 votes, and won 4.56% of votes in ridings they contested. Party leader James Beddome placed second in the Wolseley constituency with 19.64% of the vote, while nine other candidates placed third in various ridings ahead of Liberal candidates.

In 2016, the party more than doubled its total votes from 2011, breaching the 5% total vote threshold for the first time in its history. Green candidates won an average of 9.14% of the vote in ridings they contested. In Wolseley, David Nickarz would take 35.94% of the vote and come within 500 votes of unseating longtime NDP MLA Rob Altemeyer. Beddome, still the party's leader, would take 18.77% of the vote in Fort Garry-Riverview, an increase of 14 percentage points for the Greens over the previous election in that riding. The Greens also came in second in La Verendrye with Janine Gibson, Morden-Winkler with Mike Urichuk and Midland with Stacy O'Neill finishing ahead of NDP and Liberal candidates in ridings easily won by the Progressive Conservatives.

In 2019, still under Beddome's leadership, the party ran candidates in over 40 ridings for the first time ever. Greens took over 6% of the total vote, an average of 8.25% in the ridings they contested. Despite this, no Green was elected and the party finished second in only three seats (Morden-Winkler with Mike Urchik, Wolseley with David Nickarz, and Turtle Mountain with David M. Neufeld), largely due to an improved performance by the New Democratic Party.

In 2022, Beddome announced he was stepping down as leader of the GPM. He was replaced by Janine Gibson in March 2023, ahead of that year's provincial election. The Greens suffered a major setback, running only 13 candidates — the fewest since 1999, their first election — and receiving less than one percent of the total vote, and fewer raw votes than they did in 2003. The party did not finish ahead of third in any ridings, and finished third in just one riding where there were more than three candidates: Portage la Prairie, where Arishya Aggarwal finished 65 votes ahead of the last-place Liberal candidate.

In 2023, Janine Gibson's action plan consisted of ways to make the Earth a healthier habitat. The plan strived to promote operations that decreased hazardous toxins and emissions by advocating for energy efficient operations using both solar and wind technology. In addition, GPM acknowledged the expensive cost of living and discussed ways in which the party would combat the issue.

== Leadership ==
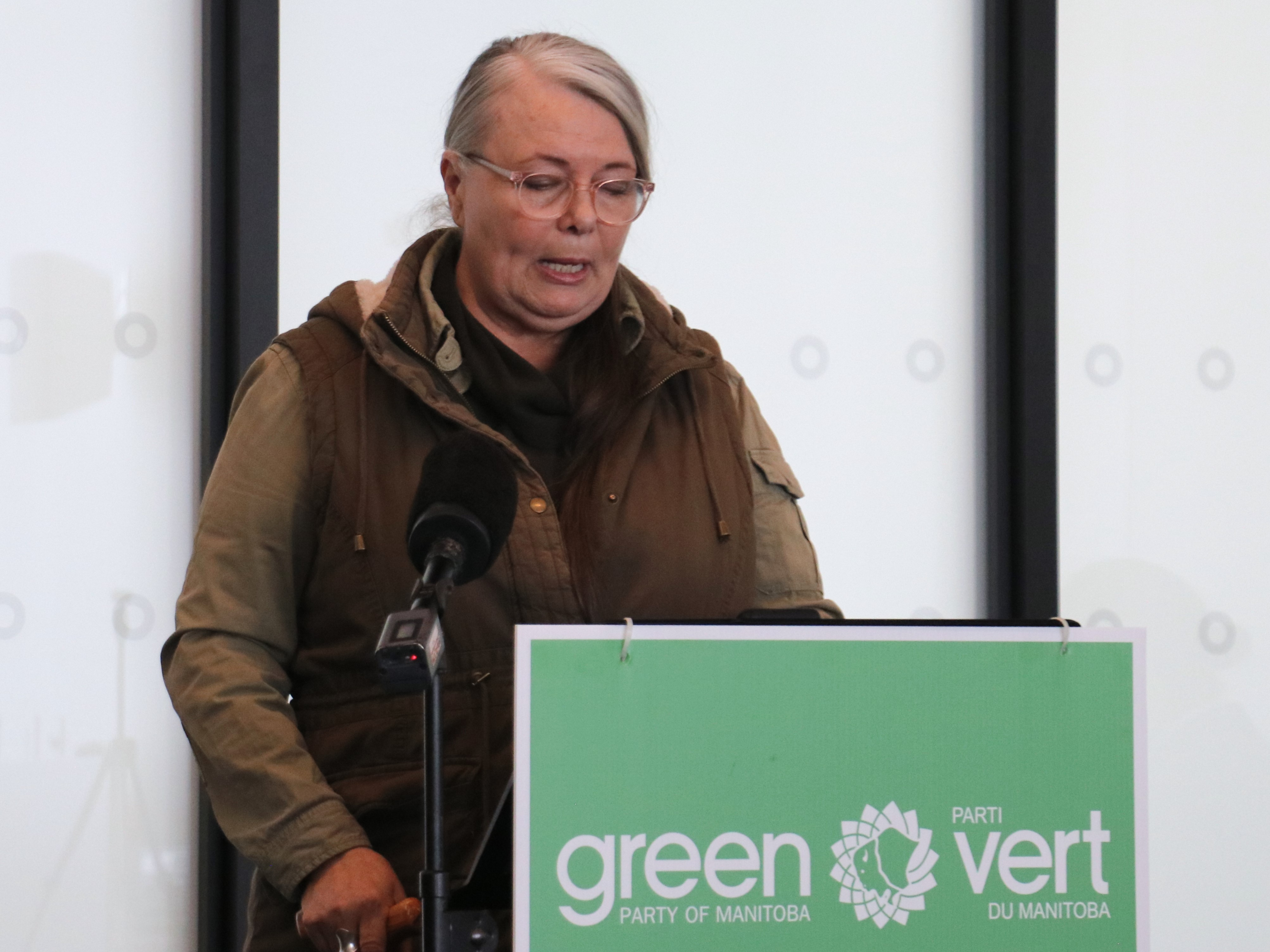
Janine G. Gibson, Leader of the GPM since March 2023.

Leaders of the Green Party of Manitoba

- Markus Buchart, 1998–2005
- Daniel Drimes, 2005
- Holly Nelson, 2005–2006
- Andrew Basham, 2006–2008
- James Beddome, 2008–2013
- Alain Landry (interim), 2013–2014
- James Beddome, 2014–2023
- Janine Gibson, 2023–present

Markus Buchart resigned as party leader in late February 2005.

The party's second leader was Daniel Drimes. He served as leader from April 2 to 22, 2005.

The party's first leadership contest under the rules of Elections Manitoba began on July 1, 2005, and a new leader was chosen on November 20, 2005. She was Holly Nelson, a retired electrical technologist and professional writer who owned a Winnipeg New Age book store, the Philosopher's Stone, during the 1990s.

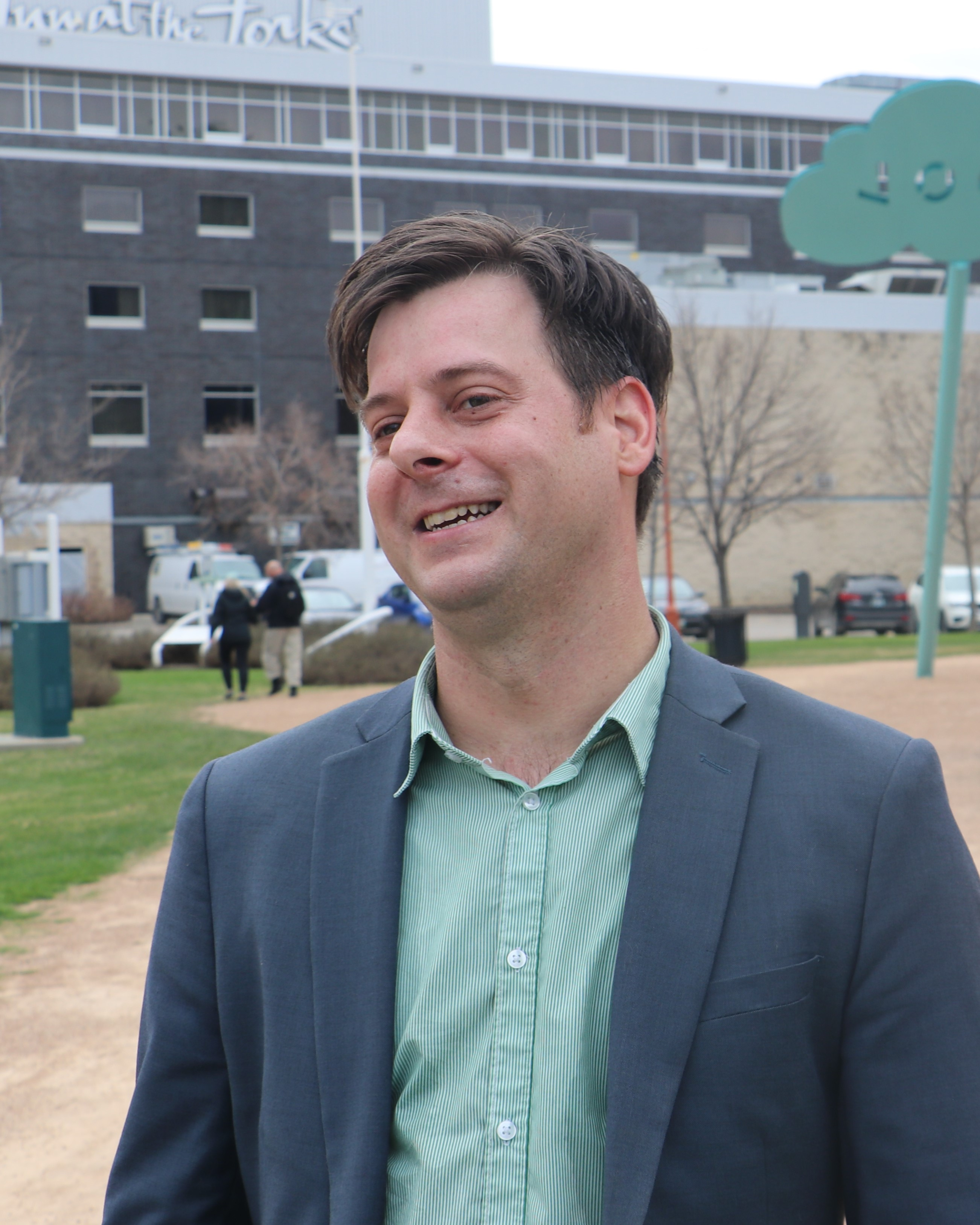
James Beddome, The longest serving leader of the GPM, led the party from 2008 to 2013 and again from 2014 to 2023.

In September 2006, a few weeks before the party's leadership convention, she stepped down, having accepted an out-of-province job. On November 19, 2006, the party chose 23-year-old Andrew Basham as its new leader.

On November 15, 2008, James Beddome was elected leader, defeating incumbent leader Andrew Basham and contender Shane Nestruck. Beddome's first term expired November 2010, and he was acclaimed a second term.

Alain Landry was appointed interim party leader for the Manitoba Greens in Nov, 2013 after the resignation of former leader James Beddome. James stepped down to focus on his new career as a lawyer after graduating from the faculty of law at the University of Manitoba in 2013.

Landry ran as a candidate in the 2007 and 2011 elections. In January 2014, he ran in the Morris by-election.

Former leader James Beddome sought to return to the leadership of the Greens and ran in the leadership race held in November 2014. He defeated past Green candidate Kate Storey in the contest with 21 votes to 9 for Storey.

In May 2022, Beddome announced that he would step down as leader of the Green Party of Manitoba. He was succeeded by Janine Gibson on March 26, 2023.

Janine Gibson is the present leader of GPM and her focus is primarily on economic conditions and improving the health of the environment. Gibson's main priority before her involvement in politics centered around natural food growth and sustainability.

== See also ==
- List of Green party leaders in Canada
- List of Green politicians who have held office in Canada
- List of Manitoba general elections
- List of political parties in Manitoba
- Politics of Manitoba
