= Elections Manitoba =

Non-partisan agency of the Government of Manitoba

- Élections Manitoba
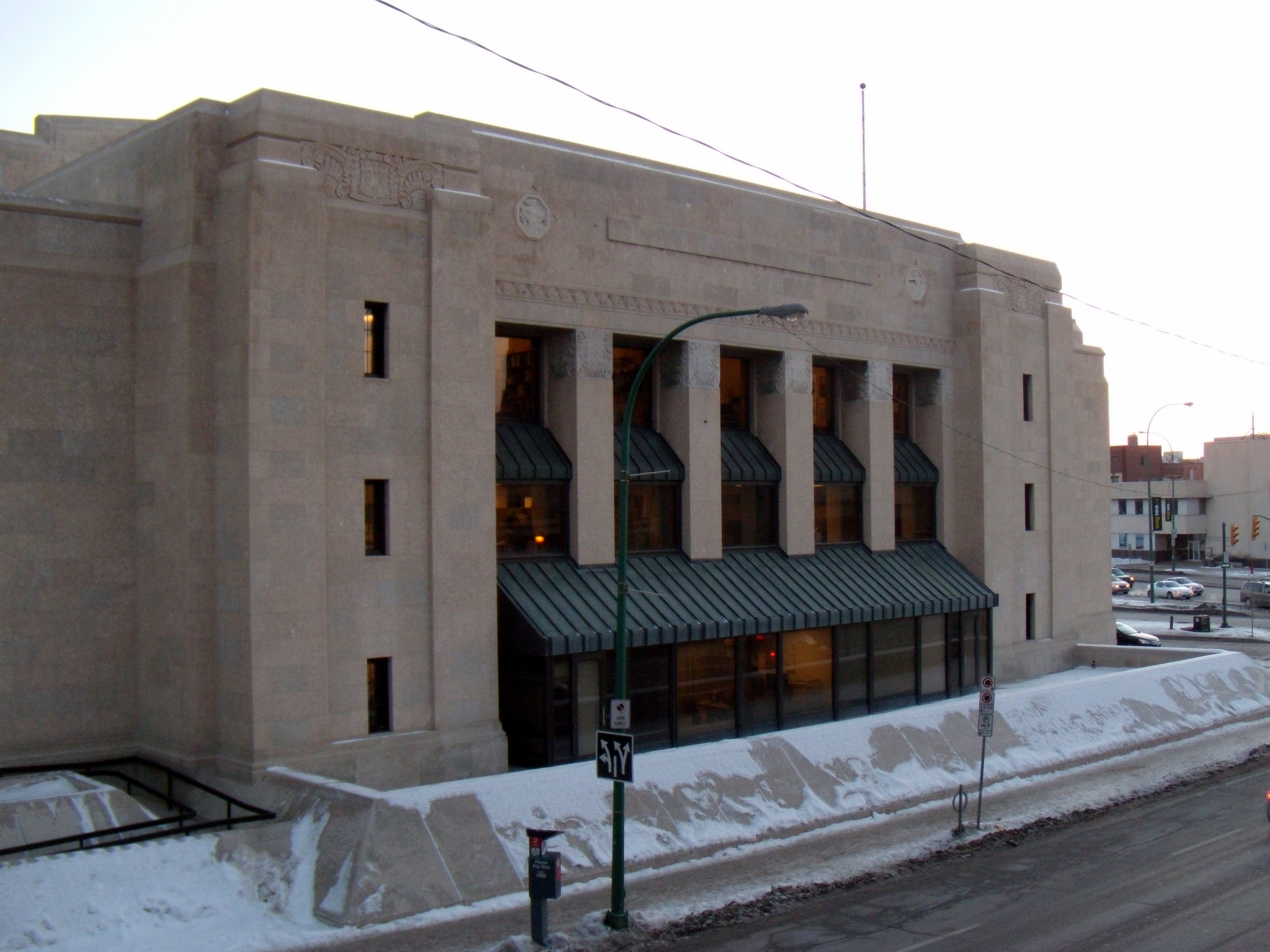
- Elections Manitoba Building in Winnipeg

Agency overview
- Formed: 1980
- Jurisdiction: elections and plebiscites in Manitoba
- Headquarters: 120 - 200 Vaughan Street Winnipeg, Manitoba R3C 1T5
- Employees: 21
- Agency executive: Josh Watt, Chief Electoral Officer
- Key documents: The Elections Act; The Election Financing Act
- Website: Official website

Elections Manitoba (French: Élections Manitoba) is the non-partisan agency of the Government of Manitoba responsible for the conduct and regulation of provincial elections in Manitoba.

Its responsibilities are to operate free of political influence; conduct Manitoba's provincial elections, by-elections, and referendums; ensure that all eligible citizens have the opportunity to vote; promote public awareness of voting and the electoral process; help political participants to comply with election rules; facilitate The Elections Act and The Election Financing Act; and recommend improvements to existing legislation.

It is the Office of the Chief Electoral Officer of Manitoba (CEO) that heads Elections Manitoba with assistance from the deputy chief electoral officer. The CEO administers provincial elections in order to ensure their fairness and freedom from political influence. The officer reports to the Legislative Assembly of Manitoba and must be non-partisan, i.e., they cannot be a member of a political party or vote in an election. The current CEO as of May 2021 is Shipra Verma, who was appointed in 2013.

The commissioner of elections is appointed by the chief electoral officer in consultation with all political parties, and is solely responsible for prosecuting and investigating violations of election law. Since 2011, Bill Bowles has served as commissioner.

== Staff and leadership ==
=== Chief electoral officer ===
Elections Manitoba is the Office of the Chief Electoral Officer of Manitoba (CEO), who heads Elections Manitoba with assistance from the deputy chief electoral officer. The CEO administers provincial elections in order to ensure their fairness and freedom from political influence. The CEO is appointed by the lieutenant governor of Manitoba and reports to the Legislative Assembly of Manitoba. The officer must be non-partisan: i.e., they cannot be a member of a political party or vote in an election.

The Office of the Chief Electoral Officer was established in 1980 to serve as an independent office of the Legislative Assembly and the clerk of Executive Council. Obstructing the CEO became an election offence as of 1998.

Manitoba chief electoral officers
Name	Period
Richard Willis	1980–1989
Richard Balasko (acting)	1989–1990
Richard Balasko	1990–2010
Shipra Verma	2013–2025
Josh Watt	2025–present

=== Returning officers ===
Elections Manitoba is headed by the chief electoral officer (CEO), who is assisted by the deputy chief electoral officer. The two are supported by a core staff of 21 people.

Returning officers (ROs), who are hired by the CEO, manage the election at the electoral division level and are the main point-of-contact for information and assistance during an election. Along with assistant returning officers, ROs provide voter services—including coordination of registration, answering questions about the voting process, setting up voting places—and candidate support—including preparation and distribution of the voters list, and distributing and receiving forms, among other things.

Returning officers recruit election officials for each electoral division. Approximately 8,000 election officials are employed to administer a general election. This includes RO staff and election officials who update the voters list and run the election at voting places across the province.

== Commissioner of elections ==
The commissioner of elections is an independent officer who is responsible for ensuring compliance with and enforcement of The Elections Act and The Election Financing Act, and is thus solely responsible for prosecuting and investigating violations of election law. (Non-compliance and enforcement matters relating to municipal or federal elections do not fall within the commissioner's jurisdiction.)

The commissioner is appointed by the chief electoral officer in consultation with the leaders of all the political parties represented in the assembly. Although appointed by the CEO, the commissioner's authority is separate from and independent of the CEO. The current commissioner is Bill Bowles, whose appointment became effective on 14 March 2011. The first commissioner, Michael T. Green, was appointed in December 2006.

The position of commissioner was created on 13 December 2006 when amendments to The Elections Act and The Election Financing Act came into effect, transferring investigative and prosecutorial responsibilities from the chief electoral officer.
