= Outline of Manitoba =

Overview of and topical guide to Manitoba

Flag of Manitoba

Location of Manitoba

The following outline is provided as an overview of and topical guide to Manitoba:

Manitoba – Canadian prairie province. The province, with an area of 649,950 square kilometres (250,900 sq mi), has a largely continental climate because of its flat topography. Agriculture, mostly concentrated in the fertile southern and western parts of the province, is vital to the province's economy; other major industries are transportation, manufacturing, mining, forestry, energy, and tourism. Manitoba's capital and largest city is Winnipeg.

== General reference ==
- Pronunciation: /ˌmænəˈtoʊbə/
- Common English name(s): Manitoba
- Official English name(s): Manitoba
  - Abbreviations and name codes
    - Postal symbol: "R"
    - ISO 3166-2 code: CA-MB
    - Internet second-level domain: .mb.ca
- Adjectival(s): Manitoba/Manitoban/Manitobain
- Demonym(s): Manitoban/Manitobain

== Geography of Manitoba ==
Geography of Manitoba

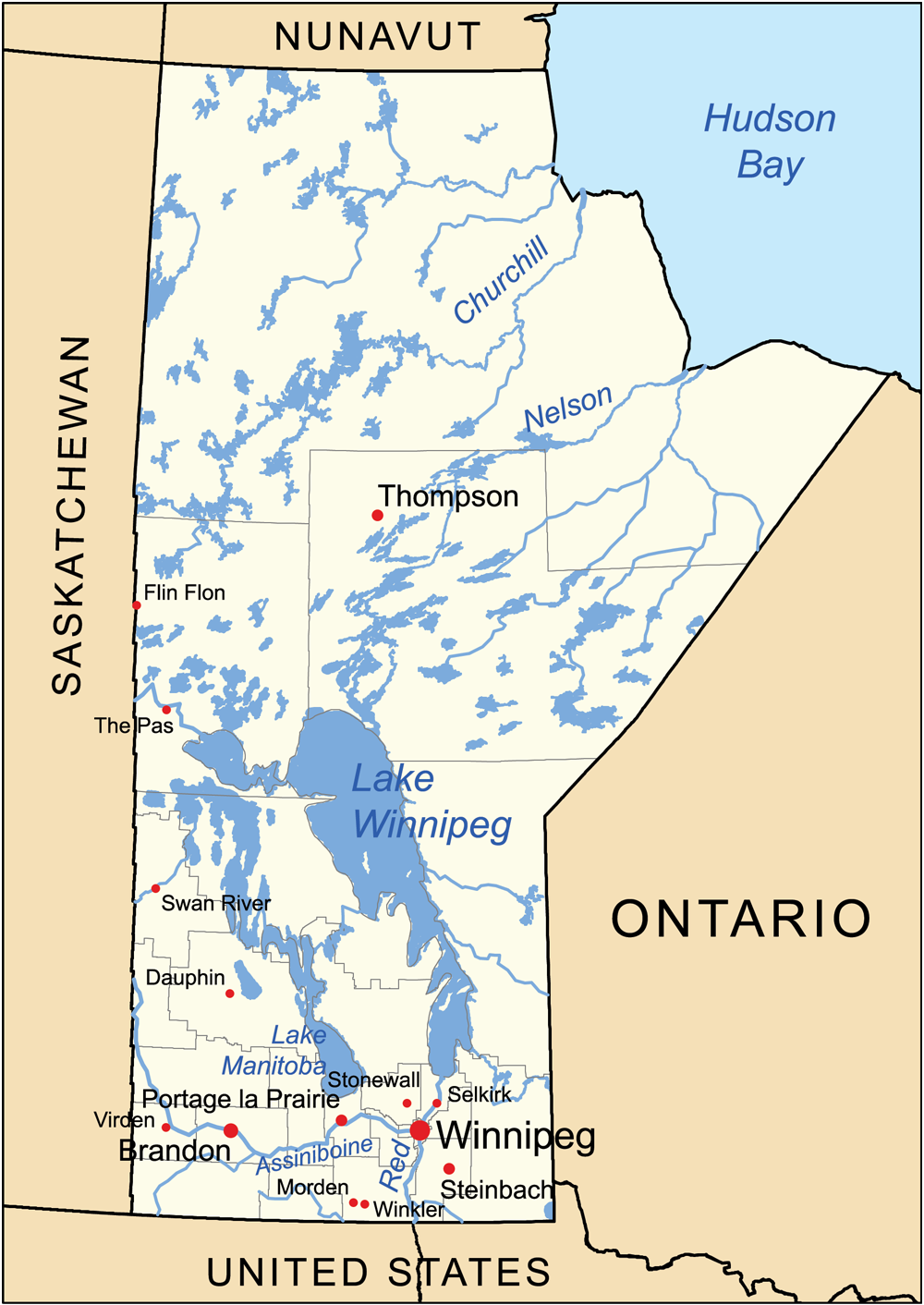
Manitoba

- Manitoba is: a province of Canada.
- Population of Manitoba: 1,232,654 (est.)
- Area of Manitoba: 649,950 km^{2} (250,950 sq. miles)

=== Location ===
- Manitoba is situated within the following regions:
  - Northern Hemisphere, Western Hemisphere
    - Americas
      - North America
        - Northern America
          - Laurentia
            - Canada
              - Western Canada
                - Canadian Prairies
- Time zones (see also Time in Canada):
  - Central Standard Time (UTC-06), Central Daylight Time (UTC-05)
- Extreme points of Manitoba

=== Environment of Manitoba ===
Canada's first reported Fujita Scale F5 tornado approaching Elie

- Climate of Manitoba
- Geology of Manitoba
- Lake Winnipeg algae threat
- List of protected areas of Manitoba
- Wildlife of Manitoba

==== Natural geographic features of Manitoba ====
- Islands of Manitoba
- Lakes of Manitoba
- List of dams and reservoirs in Manitoba
- Rivers of Manitoba
- Mountains of Manitoba

=== Heritage sites in Manitoba ===
- Historic places in Manitoba
- National Historic Sites of Canada in Manitoba

=== Regions of Manitoba ===
Regions of Manitoba

==== Manitoba reserves in Manitoba ====
- List of native reserves in Manitoba

==== Municipalities of Manitoba ====
Manitoba municipalities

- List of cities in Manitoba
  - Capital of Manitoba: Winnipeg
    - Geography of Winnipeg
      - Climate of Winnipeg
      - Demographics of Winnipeg
    - History of Winnipeg
      - List of mayors of Winnipeg
- List of rural municipalities in Manitoba

=== Demography of Manitoba ===
Demographics of Manitoba

== Government and politics of Manitoba ==
Politics of Manitoba

- Capital of Manitoba: Winnipeg
- Elections in Manitoba (last 5)
  - 2016
  - 2011
  - 2007
  - 2003
  - 1999
- Political parties in Manitoba

=== Branches of the government of Manitoba ===
Government of Manitoba

==== Executive branch of the government of Manitoba ====
- Head of state: King of Canada, King Charles III
  - Head of state's representative (Viceroy): Lieutenant Governor of Manitoba, Anita Neville
    - Previous lieutenant governors
    - Head of government: Premier of Manitoba, Wab Kinew
      - Previous premiers
      - Cabinet: Executive Council of Manitoba
        - Minister of Innovation, Energy and Mines
        - Minister of Transportation and Infrastructure
        - Minister of Environment and Climate Change
        - Minister of Indigenous Reconciliation
        - Minister responsible for sport
        - Minister of Local Government
        - Minister responsible for Emergency Measures
        - Minister responsible for the Manitoba Lotteries Corporation Act
        - Minister responsible for the Public Service
        - Minister of Finance
        - Minister responsible for Crown corporations review and accountability
        - Minister of Education and Early Childhood Learning
        - Minister of Healthy Living, Seniors and Consumer Affairs
        - Minister charged with the administration of the Liquor Control Act
        - Minister of Entrepreneurship, Training and Trade
        - Minister of Immigration and Multiculturalism
        - Minister of Health, Seniors and Long Term Care
        - Minister of Housing and Community Development
        - Attorney-General of Manitoba
        - Minister of Justice
        - Minister responsible for Constitutional Affairs
        - Minister of Family Services and Labour
        - Minister responsible for Persons with Disabilities
        - Minister responsible for the Women and Gender Equity
        - Minister of Sport, Culture, Heritage and Tourism
        - Minister of Advanced Education and Training
        - Minister of Agriculture

==== Legislative branch of the government of Manitoba ====
- Parliament of Manitoba (unicameral): Legislative Assembly of Manitoba
  - Speaker of the Legislative Assembly of Manitoba:
  - Manitoba Legislative Building
- Federal representation
  - List of Manitoba senators

==== Judicial branch of the government of Manitoba ====
- Federal Courts of Canada
  - Supreme Court of Canada
  - Federal Court of Appeal
  - Tax Court of Canada
- Canadian court of appeal: Manitoba Court of Appeal
- Superior court: Court of King's Bench of Manitoba
- Provincial Court: Provincial Court of Manitoba
- Military court: Court Martial Appeal Court of Canada

=== Law and order in Manitoba ===
Law of Manitoba

- Manitoba Bar Association – the provincial law society
- Capital punishment: none.
  - Canada eliminated the death penalty for murder on July 14, 1976.
- Manitoba Act
- Law, government, and crime in Winnipeg
- Reference re Manitoba Language Rights

=== Military of Manitoba ===
Canadian Forces Being a part of Canada, Manitoba does not have its own military. The Canadian Forces have members stationed in Manitoba.

== History of Manitoba ==
=== History of Manitoba, by period ===
- Rupert's Land / Red River Colony
- Red River Rebellion
- Manitoba Schools Question
- Winnipeg General Strike
- 1950 Red River Flood
- Meech Lake Accord
- 1997 Red River flood

=== History of Manitoba, by region ===
- History of Winnipeg
  - Timeline of Winnipeg history

== Culture of Manitoba ==
Culture of Manitoba

- Provincial decorations and medals
- Festivals in Manitoba
  - Festival du Voyageur
  - Folklorama
- Cinema of Manitoba
- Literature of Manitoba
  - List of writers from Manitoba
- Mass media in Manitoba
- Museums in Manitoba
- Music of Manitoba
- Manipogo
- Manitoba Day

=== People of Manitoba ===
- Franco-Manitoban
- List of Manitobans
- Ethnic groups in Manitoba

=== Religion in Manitoba ===
Religion in Manitoba

- Buddhism in Manitoba
- Christianity in Manitoba
- Hinduism in Manitoba
- Islam in Manitoba
- Judaism in Manitoba
- Sikhism in Manitoba
- Irreligion in Manitoba

=== Sports in Manitoba ===
- Curl Manitoba
  - List of curling clubs in Manitoba
- Baseball Manitoba
  - Winnipeg Goldeyes (American Association)
- Winnipeg Blue Bombers (Canadian Football League)
- Winnipeg Jets (National Hockey League)
- Rugby Manitoba
- Major sporting events
  - 1999 Pan American Games

=== Symbols of Manitoba ===
Symbols of Manitoba

- Coat of arms of Manitoba
- Flag of Manitoba
- Provincial flower: prairie crocus
- Provincial bird: great grey owl
- Provincial tree: white spruce
- Provincial motto: Gloriosus et Liber (Glorious and Free)
- Provincial symbol: bison
- Provincial capital: Winnipeg

== Economy and infrastructure of Manitoba ==
Economy of Manitoba

- Media in Manitoba
  - List of television stations in Manitoba
  - Radio stations in Manitoba
- Currency: Canadian dollar
- Economic history of Manitoba
- Manitoba Hydro
- Manitoba Health
  - Regional Health Authorities of Manitoba
  - List of hospitals in Manitoba
- Transportation in Manitoba
  - Airports in Manitoba
  - Railway stations in Manitoba
  - Roads in Manitoba
    - Vehicle registration plates of Manitoba
    - Manitoba Public Insurance

== Education in Manitoba ==
Education in Manitoba

- Primary and secondary education in Manitoba
  - School districts in Manitoba
- Higher education in Manitoba
  - University of Manitoba
  - University of Winnipeg
  - Brandon University
  - Red River College
  - University College of the North
  - Canadian Mennonite University

== See also ==
- Outline of Canada
- Outline of geography
  - Outline of Canada
    - Outline of Alberta
    - Outline of British Columbia
    - Outline of Nova Scotia
    - Outline of Ontario
    - Outline of Prince Edward Island
    - Outline of Quebec
    - Outline of Saskatchewan
