= Manitoba Liquor Control Commission =

Former Crown agency of the government of Manitoba, Canada

- Type: Crown corporation
- Industry: Retail (department & discount)
- Predecessor: Board of Liquor Control Commissioners
- Founded: 1923
- Defunct: 2014
- Fate: Merged with Manitoba Lotteries Corporation
- Successor: Manitoba Liquor & Lotteries Corporation
- Headquarters: Winnipeg, Manitoba
- Key people: Tannis Mindell, Chair; Winston Hodgins, President & CEO
- Products: Liquor sales and distribution to both consumers and businesses
- Revenue: ▲ approx: $284.1 m CAD (2013/2014)
- Number of employees: 1,200
- Manitoba Liquor Control Commission

Corporation overview
- Minister responsible: Minister responsible for the Liquor Control Act
- Key document: The Liquor Control Act, CCSM c L160

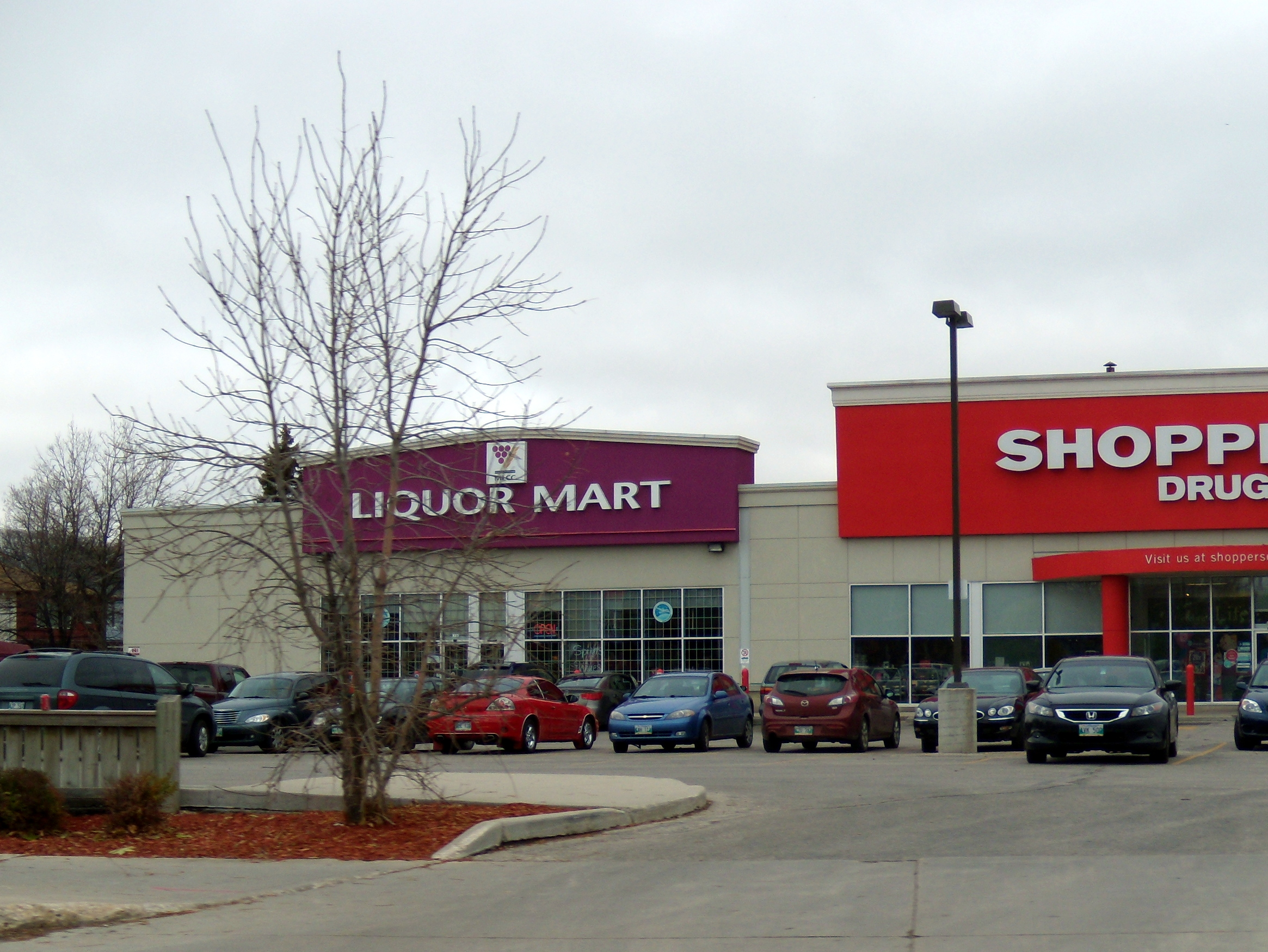
Liquor Mart in Winnipeg, Manitoba

The Manitoba Liquor Control Commission (MLCC) was a Crown corporation mandated with regulating, distributing, and selling beverage alcohol in the Canadian province of Manitoba. In 2014, the Manitoba government merged MLCC with the Manitoba Lotteries Corporation to form the Manitoba Liquor & Lotteries Corporation.

== History ==
=== Board of Liquor Control Commissioners ===
What came to be the MLCC was preceded by the three-member Board of Liquor Control Commissioners—established in 1889 under the Liquor License Act, which banned the sale, distribution, or transportation of liquor without a liquor license. Reporting directly to the Attorney General, the Board was in charge of issuing, denying, suspending, and revoking all liquor licenses within Manitoba, as well monitoring compliance with the Liquor License Act. The Board would lose much of its function in 1916 with the passing of the Manitoba Temperance Act, which banned most liquor sales within the province.

=== Liquor Control Commission ===
In 1923, the Manitoba Temperance Act was repealed by the Government Liquor Control Act, which permitted the sale of beverage liquor to the general public through government-owned and -operated stores, as well as through licensed vendors. For this, the Act dissolved the Board of Liquor Control Commissioners and formed in its place the Government Liquor Control Commission to act as the sole authority for the sale and distribution of liquor in Manitoba. The new Commission was composed of three Lieutenant-Governor-appointed members and was mandated with implementing and overseeing the provisions of the Government Liquor Control Act (1923, 1928), including the operation of liquor stores, as well as the regulation of liquor sales and use within Manitoba.

In 1957, as part of the new Liquor Control Act (1956), the Government Liquor Control Commission became known as the Liquor Control Commission of Manitoba. The Liquor Control Act modernized liquor sales and regulation; however, the Commission retained its function of controlling Manitoba liquor sales, and reported to the Minister responsible for the Liquor Control Act. The Liquor Control Act empowered the commission to buy, import, and sell liquor; control the possession, sale, and transportation of liquor; and to establish and operate liquor retailers throughout the province of Manitoba.

Beginning in the late 1970s and early 1980s, the commission's role was broadened to include greater emphasis on corporate effectiveness, product quality control, customer relations, workplace quality, and social responsibility. This brought on public campaigns for responsible alcohol consumption, and the implementation of employee development programs, among other things.

In 1980, the commission was renamed the Manitoba Liquor Control Commission.

=== Merger (2012–14) ===
In April 2012, the Government of Manitoba announced, through the provincial budget, a plan to merge the Manitoba Liquor Control Commission with Manitoba Lotteries, to form the Manitoba Liquor & Lotteries Corporation. In September 2012, the province held public consultations in six communities to discuss the merger: Arborg, Thompson, The Pas, Brandon, Winkler, and Winnipeg.

The Manitoba Liquor and Lotteries Corporation Act and the Manitoba Liquor and Gaming Control Act came into effect on 1 April 2014, officially beginning the operation of Manitoba Liquor & Lotteries Corporation. At the same time, the Liquor and Gaming Authority of Manitoba was created to absorb the regulatory functions of the two former corporations.

== Activities ==
MLCC was headquartered in Winnipeg. At the time of its merger, MLCC employed approximately 1,200 full and part-time workers, all being members of the Manitoba Government Employees Union.

In October 2008, MLCC was named one of "Canada's Top 100 Employers" by Mediacorp Canada Inc., and was featured in Maclean's newsmagazine. Later that month, MLCC was also named one of Manitoba's Top Employers, which was announced by the Winnipeg Free Press newspaper.

At the time of its merger, MLCC had 56 Liquor Mart/Liquor Mart Express locations, 175 Liquor Vendors (partners with the MLCC), and 8 specialty wine stores throughout Manitoba, and its products included a total of 4,341 active product listings as of 2012.

The MLCC's enforcement of liquor controls included inspections of licensed premises, sale permit functions as well as professional shoppers in liquor marts to ensure proof-of-age challenges.

== Minister responsible for The Liquor Control Act ==
The Minister charged with the administration of The Liquor Control Act was a government position in Manitoba responsible for the implementation and maintenance of the former Liquor Control Act, including the responsibility to oversee the Manitoba Liquor Control Commission and the Manitoba Liquor & Lotteries Corporation Rather than a full portfolio, it was always held by ministers with other cabinet responsibilities.

Name	Party	Took office	Left office	Title	Concurrent positions
Rene Toupin	NDP	15 October 1975	22 September 1976	Minister responsible for Liquor Commission	Minister of Tourism, Recreation and Cultural Affairs (1974–76); Minister of Co-operative Development (1975–77)
Howard Pawley	NDP	22 September 1976	24 October 1977	Minister responsible for administration of Liquor Control Act	Attorney-General (1973–77)
Gerald Mercier	PC	24 October 1977	30 November 1981	N/A	Attorney-General
Roland Penner	NDP	30 November 1981	21 September 1987	Minister responsible for the administration of The Liquor Control Act	Chairman of Treasury Board (1981–82); Minister of Consumer and Corporate Affairs (1983–86); Minister responsible for Constitutional Affairs (1986–88)
Gary Doer	NDP	21 September 1987	9 May 1988	Minister responsible for Liquor Control Act	Minister of Crown Investments; Minister of Manitoba Telephone System; Minister responsible for Accountability of Crown Corporations
James McCrae	PC	9 May 1988	21 April 1989	Minister responsible for Liquor Control Act	Minister of Consumer and Corporate Affairs; Minister of Co-operative Development; Minister responsible for Constitutional Affairs
James McCrae	PC	September 1990	10 September 1993	Minister responsible for Liquor Control Act	Minister of Justice and Attorney-General and Keeper of the Great Seal; Minister responsible for Constitutional Affairs, Corrections, The Corrections Act (except Part II)
Linda McIntosh	PC	5 February 1991	10 September 1993	Minister responsible for Liquor Control Act	Minister of Co-operative, Consumer and Corporate Affairs
Harold Gilleshammer	PC	10 September 1993	6 January 1997	Minister responsible for Liquor Control Act	Minister of Culture, Heritage and Citizenship; Minister responsible for Multiculturalism; Minister responsible for A.E. McKenzie Co. Ltd.
Rosemary Vodrey	PC	6 January 1997	5 October 1999	Minister charged with the administration of The Liquor Control Act	Minister of Culture, Heritage and Citizenship; Minister responsible for Multiculturalism; Minister responsible for the Status of Women
Diane McGifford	NDP	5 October 1999	17 January 2001	Minister charged with the administration of The Liquor Control Act	Minister of Culture, Heritage and Tourism
Scott Smith	NDP	17 January 2001	25 September 2002	Minister charged with the administration of The Liquor Control Act	Minister of Consumer and Corporate Affairs
Gregory Selinger	NDP	25 September 2002	4 November 2003	Minister charged with the administration of The Liquor Control Act	Minister responsible for the Civil Service (2001–09)
Scott Smith	NDP	4 November 2003	12 October 2004	Minister charged with the administration of The Liquor Control Act	Minister of Industry, Economic Development and Mines; Minister responsible for Emergency Measures; Minister charged with the administration of The Manitoba Lotteries Corporation Act
Scott Smith	NDP	12 October 2004	21 September 2006	Minister charged with the administration of The Liquor Control Act & The Manitoba Lotteries Act	Minister of Intergovernmental Affairs and Trade; Minister responsible for International Relations Co-ordination; Minister responsible for Emergency Measures
Gregory Selinger	NDP	28 June 2007	4 February 2008	Minister charged with the administration of The Liquor Control Act	Minister charged with the administration of The Manitoba Hydro Act (2006–09); Minister charged with the administration of The Manitoba Lotteries Corporation Act
Andrew Swan	NDP	4 February 2008	3 November 2009	Minister charged with the administration of The Liquor Control Act	Minister of Competitiveness, Training and Trade; Minister charged with the administration of The Manitoba Lotteries Corporation Act
Gord Mackintosh	NDP	3 November 2009	13 January 2012	Minister charged with the administration of The Liquor Control Act	Minister of Family Services and Consumer Affairs
Jim Rondeau	NDP	13 January 2012	18 October 2013	Minister charged with the administration of The Liquor Control Act	Minister of Healthy Living, Seniors and Consumer Affairs
Ron Lemieux	NDP	18 October 2013	3 May 2016	Minister charged with the administration of the Manitoba Liquor Control Act	Minister of Tourism, Culture, Sport and Consumer Protection; Minister charged with the administration of the Manitoba Lotteries Corporation Act
