= 2009 New Democratic Party of Manitoba leadership election =

Provincial political party election in Canada

2009 Manitoba New Democratic Party leadership election
- September 16, 2009
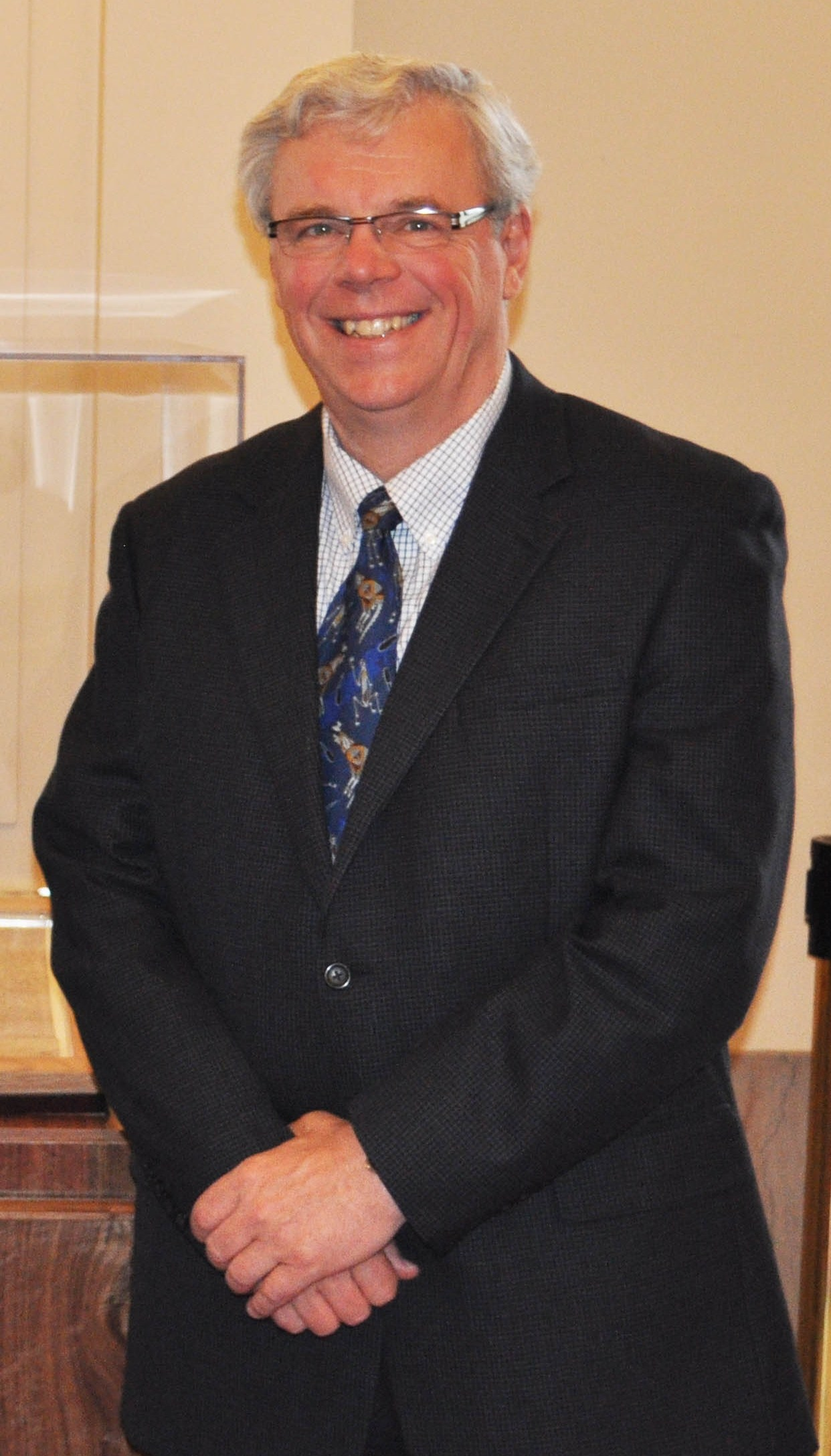
		NDP
Candidate	Greg Selinger	Steve Ashton
Riding	St. Boniface	Thompson
Final ballot	1,317 (65.75%)	685 (34.20%)
Leader before election
Gary Doer
Elected Leader
Greg Selinger

2009 New Democratic Party of Manitoba leadership election
- Date: October 16–17, 2009
- Convention: Winnipeg, Manitoba, Canada
- Resigning leader: Gary Doer
- Won by: Greg Selinger
- Ballots: 1
- Candidates: Steve Ashton; Greg Selinger; Andrew Swan (withdrew)
- Entrance fee: C$500 (deposit)
- Spending limit: C$50,000

The New Democratic Party of Manitoba leadership election of 2009 was prompted by party leader Gary Doer's announced pending resignation. Doer announced on August 27, 2009, that he intended to resign as leader of the New Democratic Party of Manitoba and Premier of Manitoba and the next day he announced that he was to become the next Canadian Ambassador to the United States. A leadership convention was held on October 16–17 to choose the new leader. There were two candidates for the position: former Minister of Intergovernmental Affairs, Steve Ashton and former Minister of Finance, Greg Selinger. Selinger received 65.75% of the ballots, and as such was elected party leader and became Premier-designate.

== Declared candidates ==
=== Steve Ashton ===
Steve Ashton is the Member of the Legislative Assembly for Thompson and was the Minister of Intergovernmental Affairs until he resigned to run for the leadership on September 4, 2009.

==== Endorsements ====
- Niki Ashton, Member of Parliament for Churchill (candidate's daughter)
- Daryl Reid, Member of the Legislative Assembly for Transcona
- Bidhu Jha, Member of the Legislative Assembly for Radisson

=== Greg Selinger ===
Greg Selinger is the Member of the Legislative Assembly for St. Boniface and was the Minister of Finance until he resigned to run for the leadership on September 8, 2009.

==== Endorsements ====
Provincial cabinet ministers

- Nancy Allan, Minister of Labour and Immigration
- Diane McGifford, Minister of Advanced Education and Literacy
- Christine Melnick, Minister of Water Stewardship
- Kerri Irvin-Ross, Minister of Healthy Living
- Theresa Oswald, Minister of Health
- Eric Robinson, Minister of Culture, Heritage, Tourism and Sport and Acting Minister of Aboriginal and Northern Affairs
- Jim Rondeau, Minister of Energy, Science and Technology
- Rosann Wowchuk, Minister of Agriculture, Food and Rural Initiatives

Members of Parliament

- Judy Wasylycia-Leis, Member of Parliament for Winnipeg North

Members of the Legislative Assembly

- Rob Altemeyer, Member of the Legislative Assembly for Wolseley
- Bill Blaikie, Member of the Legislative Assembly for Elmwood; former Dean of the House of Commons and Member of Parliament for Elmwood—Transcona
- Marilyn Brick, Member of the Legislative Assembly for St. Norbert
- Drew Caldwell, Member of the Legislative Assembly for Brandon East
- Greg Dewar, Member of the Legislative Assembly for Selkirk
- Jennifer Howard, Member of the Legislative Assembly for Fort Rouge
- Bonnie Korzeniowski, Member of the Legislative Assembly for St. James
- Flor Marcelino, Member of the Legislative Assembly for Wellington
- Doug Martindale, Member of the Legislative Assembly for Burrows
- Mohinder Saran, Member of the Legislative Assembly for The Maples

Other high-profile endorsements

- Darlene Dziewit, former President of the Manitoba Federation of Labour
- Jenny Gerbasi, Winnipeg City Councillor for Fort Rouge—East Fort Garry
- Paul Moist, National President of the Canadian Union of Public Employees
- Muriel Smith, former Deputy Premier of Manitoba

== Withdrawn candidates ==
=== Andrew Swan ===
Andrew Swan is the Member of the Legislative Assembly for Minto and was the Minister of Competitiveness, Training and Trade until he resigned to run for the leadership on September 2, 2009. Swan dropped out of the race on September 28, 2009 and regained his ministerial positions on October 5, 2009.

== Did not run ==
- Nancy Allan, Minister of Labour and Immigration
- Bill Blaikie, MLA and former Dean of the Canadian House of Commons
- Dave Chomiak, Minister of Justice
- Jennifer Howard, MLA
- Bidhu Jha, MLA
- Gord Mackintosh, Minister of Family Services and Housing
- Pat Martin, MP (Winnipeg Centre)
- Christine Melnick, Minister of Water Stewardship
- Theresa Oswald, Minister of Health
- Stan Struthers, Conservation Minister
- Dan Vandal, Winnipeg city councillor
- Judy Wasylycia-Leis, MP and former provincial cabinet minister

== Results ==
New Democratic Party of Manitoba leadership election, 2009
Candidate	Votes	Percentage
Greg Selinger	1,317	65.75%
Steve Ashton	685	34.20%
Spoiled ballots	1	0.05%
Total	2,003	100.00%
