= Andrew Swan =

Former Manitoba NDP; former Manitoba Minister of Competitiveness, Training and Trade

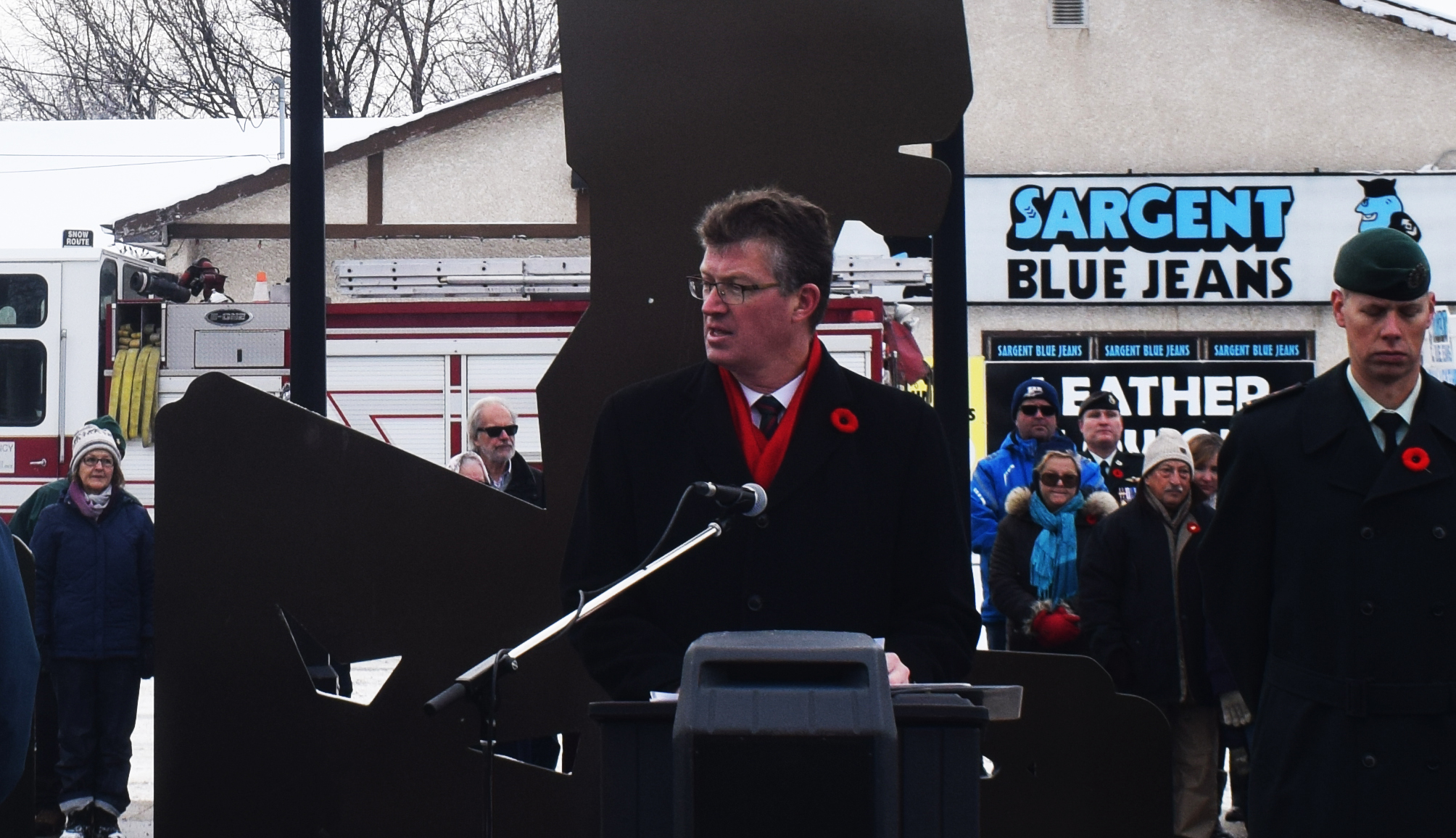
- Andrew Swan at the 2017 Valour Road Remembrance Day ceremony.

Manitoba Government House Leader
- In office October 18, 2013 – November 3, 2014
- Premier: Greg Selinger
- Preceded by: Jennifer Howard

Manitoba Minister of Justice and Attorney General
- In office November 3, 2009 – November 3, 2014
- Premier: Greg Selinger
- Preceded by: Dave Chomiak
- Succeeded by: James Allum

Manitoba Minister of Competitiveness, Training and Trade
- In office October 5, 2009 – November 3, 2009
- Premier: Gary Doer; Greg Selinger
- Preceded by: Nancy Allan (interim)
- Succeeded by: Peter Bjornson
- In office February 4, 2008 – September 2, 2009
- Premier: Gary Doer
- Preceded by: Scott Smith
- Succeeded by: Nancy Allan (interim)

Member of the Legislative Assembly of Manitoba for Minto
- In office June 22, 2004 – August 12, 2019
- Preceded by: MaryAnn Mihychuk
- Succeeded by: riding dissolved

Personal details
- Born: August 9, 1968 (age 58) Winnipeg, Manitoba, Canada
- Party: New Democratic
- Education: University of Manitoba
- Profession: Lawyer

Andrew James Swan (born August 9, 1968) is a politician in Manitoba, Canada. He served in the Legislative Assembly of Manitoba from 2004 to 2019. He was first elected in a 2004 by-election, replacing MaryAnn Mihychuk, who resigned to run for Mayor of Winnipeg.

Swan graduated from the University of Manitoba faculty of law in 1990. After graduating, he practised law at the firm of Thompson Dorfman Sweatman, becoming a partner in 2000. His specialty was family law. Swan was appointed to the Residential Tenancies Commission in 2000, and is also a member of the Manitoba Running Association.

Swan first ran for the Manitoba legislature as a New Democrat in the 1990 provincial election, placing third in the west-end Winnipeg riding of Sturgeon Creek. Gerry McAlpine of the Progressive Conservatives won, while incumbent Liberal MLA Iva Yeo came second. Swan did not seek political office again until 2004.

On June 22, 2004, Swan was elected as a New Democrat for the riding of Minto, defeating his next closest competitor, Liberal Wayne Helgason, by 2,848 votes to 1,616. He was re-elected in the 2007 provincial election. He was appointed to Premier Gary Doer's cabinet on February 4, 2008, as Minister of Competitiveness, Training and Trade, Minister charged with the administration of the Liquor Control Act, and Minister charged with the administration of The Manitoba Lotteries Corporation Act.

On September 2, 2009, after Doer resigned from the Assembly to become Ambassador to the United States, Swan resigned his cabinet position and announced his candidacy for the leadership of the NDP. His cabinet colleagues Steve Ashton and Greg Selinger also announced they would seek the leadership. Nancy Allan replaced Swan as interim Minister of Competitiveness, Training and Trade. The leadership convention took place on October 17, 2009. On September 28, Swan dropped out of the leadership race and endorsed Selinger. He regained his ministerial positions on October 5, 2009.

After winning the leadership race, Selinger appointed Swan as Minister of Justice and Attorney General on November 3. He was re-elected in 2011.

Swan resigned his cabinet position on November 3, 2014, along with Jennifer Howard, Theresa Oswald, Erin Selby and Stan Struthers, due to concerns about Premier Selinger's leadership. He remained an NDP MLA after resignation. Despite a collapse in NDP support for the 2016 election, he retained his seat by a comfortable margin.

On January 20, 2019, Swan announced he would seek the federal NDP nomination in the riding of Winnipeg Centre in the 2019 Canadian federal election. He lost the nomination to community activist Leah Gazan, who went on to become the MP for Winnipeg Centre. He did not seek re-election in the snap 2019 Manitoba general election, at which the 2018 electoral redistribution, which eliminated Minto, took effect.
