= Ministry of Intergovernmental Affairs =

Ministry of Intergovernmental Affairs may refer to:

- The Ministry of Intergovernmental Affairs (Manitoba)
- The Ministry of Intergovernmental Affairs (Ontario)
