= Western Independence Party of Manitoba candidates in the 1990 Manitoba provincial election =

The Western Independence Party of Manitoba ran six candidates in the 1990 provincial election, none of whom were elected.

== Jan Mandseth (Fort Garry) ==
Mandseth received 249 votes (2.30%), finishing fourth against Progressive Conservative candidate Rosemary Vodrey.
