= New Careers =

New Careers is a former education and training program in Manitoba, Canada. It was established in 1971 by the provincial government of Edward Schreyer.

The program claimed a 92-93% job success rate during the 1990s, the highest in the country. Follow-up research showed that 75% were still working three years later. Many of its graduates were from disadvantaged backgrounds, and several were from the province's aboriginal communities. George Hickes, the current Speaker of the Legislative Assembly of Manitoba, has credited New Careers with turning his life around after a troubled youth.

New Careers was all but eliminated by the government of Gary Filmon in the mid-1990s. Education Minister Rosemary Vodrey imposed a 35% funding cutback on the organization in 1993, and her successor Clayton Manness halved the program in 1994. In 1995, Manness announced that all but four workers in the program would be laid off. Several opposition legislators criticized these decisions.
