= New Democratic Party of Manitoba candidates in the 1995 Manitoba provincial election =

The New Democratic Party of Manitoba ran a full slate of 57 candidates in the 1995 Manitoba provincial election, and elected 23 members to the Legislative Assembly of Manitoba to remain as the official opposition. Several of the party's candidates have individual biography pages; information about others may be found here.

== Brock Holowachuk (Fort Garry) ==
Brock Holowachuk is a senior planning officer with Manitoba Emergency Measures Organization. He previously worked with the provincial Office of the Fire Commissioner, and was involved in risk analysis and hazard assessment. He has coordinated provincial-federal activities related to the Council of the Federation, and has served as Secretary to Manitoba’s Security Subcommittee of Cabinet and the All Party Task Force on Security. He was president of Manitoba's Disaster Recovery Information Exchange in 2007-08, and has published several works on emergency planning. He has also taken a prominent role in devising strategies for the rescue and care of household pets.

Holowachuk received 1,857 votes (15.05%) as a New Democratic Party candidate in 1995, finishing third against Progressive Conservative Party incumbent Rosemary Vodrey.
