= Scott Smith (Canadian politician) =

Canadian politician

Member of the Legislative Assembly of Manitoba for Brandon West
- In office September 21, 1999 – May 22, 2007
- Preceded by: James McCrae
- Succeeded by: Rick Borotsik

Personal details
- Born: 1959 (age 66–67) Brandon, Manitoba, Canada
- Party: New Democratic Party of Manitoba
- Profession: firefighter

Scott Smith (born 1959) is a politician in Manitoba, Canada. He was a member of the Legislative Assembly of Manitoba as New Democratic Party from 1999 to 2007, and was a cabinet minister in the government of Gary Doer.

== Early life and career ==
Smith was born and raised in Brandon, Manitoba, and worked as a firefighter for twenty years before entering provincial politics. He was elected to the Brandon City Council in 1995, defeating an incumbent councillor in the city's seventh ward. He also ran for Mayor of Brandon in a by-election two years later, and finished third against Reg Atkinson in a close three-way contest. Smith continued to sit as a councillor during the mayoral campaign, and was re-elected without opposition in 1998. While on council, he served as chair of Brandon's poverty task force, grants review committee and taxi review committee.

== Member of the Legislative Assembly ==
=== Government backbencher ===
Smith was first elected to the Manitoba legislature in the 1999 provincial election, defeating longtime Progressive Conservative MLA and sitting Minister of Education and Training James McCrae in the division of Brandon West. The NDP won a majority government provincially, and Smith entered the legislature as a backbench supporter of Gary Doer's government. He served as Legislative Assistant to the Minister of Industry, Trade and Mines.

=== Cabinet minister ===
Minister of Consumer and Corporate Affairs

Smith was promoted to cabinet on January 17, 2001 as Minister of Consumer and Corporate Affairs, with responsibility for administration of the Liquor Control Act. In this capacity, he defended his government's support for rent control over opposition from landlord groups. He increased the maximum rent increase from 1.5% to 2% for 2002, but lowered it to 1% for 2003.

In May 2002, Smith introduced legislation giving investors the right to seek financial compensation from advisers who mismanage funds through violations of the Manitoba Securities Act. Maximum compensation was set at $100,000. This legislation was the first of its kind in Canada. Smith also introduced legislation to protect customers from negative option billing, and reformed provincial laws concerning reverse mortgages.

Liquor Control Act

As Minister responsible for the Liquor Control Act, Smith indicated that his government would not expand the number of private wine stores in the province. He oversaw a tax break for Manitoba's microbrewery industry in April 2001, when the Manitoba Liquor Control Commission reduced its mark-up rates.

In June 2001, Smith announced that Manitoba's liquor laws would be reformed to allow liquor stores, beverage rooms, vendors and private clubs to open on Sundays. Municipalities were allowed to pass by-laws exempting themselves from the legislation. Due in part to extra revenue from this change, the Manitoba Liquor Control Commission's net profits increased by $4.7 million in the 2001-02 year.

Other responsibilities

Smith was appointed to the influential Treasury Board of cabinet on March 24, 2001, replacing Oscar Lathlin. Following the September 11 attacks, he was appointed to an all-party task force on provincial security. In December 2001, he introduced steps to prevent the spread of false or forged birth certificates.

Minister of Transportation and Government Services

Premier Gary Doer shuffled his cabinet on September 25, 2002, and appointed Smith as Minister of Transportation and Government Services with responsibility for Emergency Measures and administration of the Manitoba Lotteries Corporation Act.

Transportation

In October 2002, Smith instructed drivers of the province's fleet vehicles to purchase environmentally friendly ethanol fuel in areas where it was reasonably available. He said that the Doer government wanted to see ethanol made more widely available across the province, and hoped his decision would provide an incentive for retailers. Provincial ethanol purchases increased dramatically in the last three months of the year. Smith also unveiled two hybrid electric cars for the provincial fleet in December 2002, and said that he planned to double the number of environmentally friendly vehicles in provincial service.

In February 2003, Smith introduced a plan to have the Trans-Canada Highway twinned as far as the Saskatchewan border over a period of four years. The plan was conditional on financial aid from the federal government. In the same year, he joined with federal cabinet minister Rey Pagtakhan to announce significant upgrades to Manitoba's highway system.

Smith also introduced a number of measures to improve driving safety in Manitoba. In September 2003, he indicated that repeat drunk drivers would be required to install ignition-interlock devices in their cars, requiring them to pass a breathalyzer test before the car could be started. He introduced tougher penalties for seatbelt violations, and sought to introduce high-technology drivers' licenses with biometric information.

Government Services

Smith announced in November 2002 that the Doer government would expedite the tendering process for provincial capital construction, indicating that 80% of projects would be tendered by January. Many contracts had not been not tendered until the spring or early summer in previous years, and some in the industry complained that the delays led to market confusion.

Smith was also in charge of the provincial government's efforts to maintain economic viability for the financially troubled port city of Churchill in northern Manitoba. The government pledged one million dollars to find new markets and new products for the city in early 2003.

Smith presided over a memorial ceremony for the victims of the September 11 attacks at the International Peace Garden in September 2003. He drew attention to his own background as a firefighter in paying tribute to those who died in the New York City attacks.

Minister of Industry, Economic Development and Mines

Smith was re-elected in the 2003 provincial election, winning an unexpectedly easy victory over former Brandon Mayor Reg Atkinson. He was promoted to Minister of Industry, Economic Development and Mines on November 4, 2003, retaining responsibility for Emergency Measures and the Manitoba Lotteries Act. He was also given responsibility for the Liquor Control Act a second time.

Smith helped oversee the controversial expansion of Manitoba's pharmaceutical sector, and defended local retailers who profited from the sale of medicine to American buyers.

Smith also worked with Manitoba beef farmers through the summer of 2004, in an effort to purchase a new slaughterhouse with thorough bovine spongiform encephalopathy testing procedures. The value of Canadian cattle had declined dramatically in previous months, when the American border was closed to trade after BSE was found in a single Canadian cow. Many farmers argued that a more comprehensive testing system would be necessary to reopen the American border.

As Minister of Mines, Smith oversaw the expansion of Manitoba's burgeoning gold sector. The province announced $1.4 million in tax credits for the mining industry in spring 2004.

Minister of Intergovernmental Affairs and Trade

Smith was promoted again on October 12, 2004 to Minister of Intergovernmental Affairs and Trade. He retained responsibility for Emergency Measures, Lotteries and the Liquor Control Act, and also became minister responsible for International Relations Coordination.

Shortly after his appointment, Smith announced that the Doer government would not proceed with a series of controversial changes to the provincial Planning Act. Farmers and environmental groups had criticized the changes, arguing that they would remove municipal oversight from the expansion of hog farms. Smith argued that the proposed changes were no longer necessary, due to the Water Protection Act being developed by his government. He introduced a revised set of changes in 2005, which received cautious support from advocacy groups.

In November 2004, Smith introduced an amendment to the City of Winnipeg's charter allowing the city to provide business tax relief for selected neighbourhoods. Previous rules had mandated a uniform rate for the entire city. The following year, Smith introduced greater property tax flexibility for all Manitoba municipalities. He introduced the Capital Region Partnership Act in the same period, requiring Winnipeg and the surrounding municipalities to cooperate in the development of regional lands.

The federal government distributed gas tax revenues to the provinces in 2005, and gave provincial governments discretion over how the monies would be divided. Following discussions with the Association of Manitoba Municipalities, Smith announced that the money would be distributed to different parts of the province on a per capita basis. Representatives from major cities brought forward an alternate proposal, wherein 90% of the funds would be made available on a per capita basis and 10% put directly toward public transit in urban centres.

Smith approved the Doer government's proposal to create the Waverley West subdivision of Winnipeg in April 2005, notwithstanding concerns that his membership in the government created an inherent bias. In time, the suburb is expected to become larger than Brandon. In 2006, Smith announced $200,000 for emergency programs in north and west-end Winnipeg.

Emergency Measures

Smith and the Broadcasters Association of Manitoba introduced a new public emergency notification system in late 2003, ensuring that details of an emergency will be conveyed by radio and television within 15–30 minutes of its occurrence.

In November 2003, Smith designated Selkirk as the first city in Manitoba to have exceeded its emergency preparedness requirements. In March 2005, he introduced legislation allowing Manitoba to sign mutual agreements for emergency preparedness with other provinces, American states, and countries. He also coordinated flood relief for various parts of Manitoba over a period of several years.

Other responsibilities

Smith served as acting Highways Minister in the summer of 2006. He indicated that Manitoba would consider raising its speed limit to 110 km/hour for selected twinned highways, putting Manitoba policy in line with American states and other provinces.

Minister of Competitiveness, Training and Trade

After another cabinet shuffle on September 21, 2006, Smith was designated as Minister of Competitiveness, Training and Trade while retaining responsibility for Lotteries and the Liquor Control Act. He continued to defend Manitoba's pharmaceutical industry against criticism from the Canadian Pharmacists Association, arguing that Manitoba companies have a proven track record of providing a safe and secure product to buyers. Smith presided over a continued expansion in Manitoba's manufacturing sector, with Statistics Canada reporting the creation of 3,000 new jobs in January 2007.

Liquor Control Act

Smith announced modernizing reforms to the Liquor Control Act in late 2004, giving private wine stores the right to sell drinks such as brandy and cognac. He also indicated that Manitobans would be allowed to re-seal half-empty wine bottles ordered in restaurants, and bring them home. Most restaurateurs supported this change.

Lotteries

Smith defended the use of Video Lottery Terminals as a source of government revenue, and rejected a 2003 proposal from Progressive Conservative MLA John Loewen to phase out most terminals from the province. Loewen argued that the machines brought a huge social burden upon Manitoba; Smith responded that the province had taken steps to combat gambling addiction and was introducing machines with responsible gaming software. He also noted that Manitoba received $232 million annually from lottery revenues, and argued that the money was necessary to fund social programs.

Smith rejected a proposal to allow Automated Teller Machines into casinos in January 2004, although he approved a plan to allow Sunday gambling in hotels, bars and lounges.

In April 2004, Smith indicated that his government would review a Manitoba Lottery Corporation regulation that mandated English as the only language permitted at gambling tables (Manitoba recognizes English and French as official languages). As a short-term measure, he announced that both of Winnipeg's casinos would hire a French-speaking card dealer.

The Manitoba Lotteries Corp. posted a profit of $146.2 million for the first half of 2006, a $6.4 million increase over the previous year.

Leadership ambitions

Prior to the 2007 provincial election, Smith was the only member of Gary Doer's cabinet to openly contemplate running for the party leadership after Doer retires. A Winnipeg Free Press writer argued that many party members considered him to be too right-wing for the position.

2007 election

Smith was narrowly defeated by Progressive Conservative candidate Rick Borotsik, a popular former mayor, in the 2007 provincial election. He was the only New Democratic Party incumbent to lose his seat in the election.

== Federal politics ==
Smith supported Bill Blaikie's bid to become leader of the federal New Democratic Party in 2003.

== Trivia ==
- Smith defeated Winnipeg Mayor Sam Katz in a friendly competition in the 2006 Winnipeg marathon. Smith finished the 26-mile marathon in three hours and fifty-four minutes, while Katz took four hours and thirty-seven minutes.

== Table of offices held ==
Manitoba provincial government of Gary Doer
Cabinet posts (5)
Predecessor	Office	Successor
position created in 2006	Minister of Competitiveness, Training and Trade; 2006-	Jim Rondeau
Rosann Wowchuk	Minister of Intergovernmental Affairs and Trade; 2004-2006	himself, Steve Ashton*
MaryAnn Mihychuk*	Minister of Industry, Economic Development, and Mines; 2003-2004	Jim Rondeau
Steve Ashton	Minister of Transportation and Government Services; 2002-2003	Ron Lemieux
Ron Lemieux	Minister of Consumer and Corporate Affairs; 2001-2002	position eliminated in 2002
Special Cabinet Responsibilities
Predecessor	Title	Successor
Rosann Wowchuk	Minister responsible for International Relations Coordination; 2004-2006	position eliminated in 2006
Greg Selinger	Minister responsible for the Liquor Control Act; 2003-	Greg Selinger
Diane McGifford	Minister responsible for the Manitoba Lotteries Corporation Act; 2002-	Greg Selinger
position created in 2002	Minister responsible for Emergency Measures; 2002-2006	Steve Ashton
Diane McGifford	Minister responsible for the Liquor Control Act; 2001-2002	Greg Selinger
Legislative Assembly of Manitoba
Preceded by James McCrae	Member of the Legislative Assembly for Brandon West; 1999-2007	Succeeded by Rick Borotsik
Political offices
Preceded by Romeo Lemieux	Member of Brandon City Council for Linden Lanes Ward; 1995-1999	Succeeded by Ken Fitzpatrick

- Ashton was designated as Minister of Intergovernmental Affairs.
- Mihychuk was designated as Minister of Industry, Trade and Mines.

== Electoral record ==
2007 Manitoba general election: Brandon West
Party	Candidate	Votes	%	±%	Expenditures
Progressive Conservative	Rick Borotsik	4,730	48.04	13.12	$29,059.52
New Democratic	Scott Smith	4,674	47.48	-13.55	$27,506.06
Liberal	M. J. Willard	398	4.04	-0.01	$6,098.53
Communist	Lisa Gallagher	43	0.44	–	
Total valid votes		9,845	–	–	
Rejected		39	–		
Eligible voters / turnout		14,796	66.80	6.37	
Source(s) Source: Manitoba. Chief Electoral Officer (2007). Statement of Votes for the 39th Provincial General Election, May 22, 2007 (PDF) (Report). Winnipeg: Elections Manitoba.

2003 Manitoba general election: Brandon West
Party	Candidate	Votes	%	±%	Expenditures
New Democratic	Scott Smith	5,210	61.02	11.76	$20,721.62
Progressive Conservative	Reg Atkinson	2,982	34.93	-10.79	$15,828.88
Liberal	Candace Sigurdson	346	4.05	-0.04	$2,086.52
Total valid votes		8,538	–	–	
Rejected		28	–		
Eligible voters / turnout		14,174	60.43	-12.70	
Source(s) Source: Manitoba. Chief Electoral Officer (2003). Statement of Votes for the 38th Provincial General Election, June 3, 2003 (PDF) (Report). Winnipeg: Elections Manitoba.

1999 Manitoba general election: Brandon West
Party	Candidate	Votes	%	±%	Expenditures
New Democratic	Scott Smith	4,898	49.26	18.43	$17,671.00
Progressive Conservative	James McCrae	4,546	45.72	-3.68	$29,994.07
Liberal	Lisa Roy	407	4.09	-15.67	$600.00
Communist	Lisa Gallagher	92	0.93	–	$0.00
Total valid votes		9,943	–	–	
Rejected		75	–		
Eligible voters / turnout		13,698	73.13	5.39	
Source(s) Source: Manitoba. Chief Electoral Officer (1999). Statement of Votes for the 37th Provincial General Election, September 21, 1999 (PDF) (Report). Winnipeg: Elections Manitoba.

1998 Brandon municipal election: Councillor, Ward Seven
Candidate	Votes	%
(x)Scott Smith	acclaimed	.

Brandon, Manitoba municipal by-election, September 24, 1997: Mayor of Brandon
Candidate	Votes	%
Reg Atkinson	elected	-
Dan Munroe	about 200 votes behind	-
Scott Smith	about 400 votes behind	-
Geoff Borden		-
three other candidates	not listed	-

1995 Brandon municipal election: Councillor, Ward Seven
Candidate	Votes	%
Scott Smith	1,350	66.34
(x)Romeo Lemieux	685	33.66
Total valid votes	2,035	100.00

All provincial election information is taken from Elections Manitoba. Expenditure entries refer to individual candidate expenses.
