= Minister responsible for Constitutional Affairs (Manitoba) =

The minister responsible for constitutional affairs was a position included in the Executive Council of Manitoba from 1986 to 2016. The position was not a full cabinet portfolio, and had always been held by a minister with other cabinet responsibilities, typically the provincial Minister of Justice, Attorney-General and Keeper of the Great Seal.

== List of ministers responsible for constitutional affairs ==
Name	Party	Took office	Left office	Concurrent positions
Roland Penner	New Democratic Party	April 17, 1986	May 9, 1988	
James McCrae	Progressive Conservative	May 9, 1988	April 21, 1989	Minister of Consumer and Corporate Affairs; Minister of Co-operative Development; Minister responsible for Liquor Control Act
James McCrae	Progressive Conservative	September 1990	September 10, 1993	Minister of Justice and Attorney General; Minister responsible for Corrections and for The Corrections Act except Part II; Minister responsible for Liquor Control Act
Rosemary Vodrey	Progressive Conservative	September 10, 1993	January 6, 1997	Minister of Justice and Attorney General; Minister responsible for the Status of Women
Vic Toews	Progressive Conservative	January 6, 1997	October 5, 1999	Minister of Justice and Attorney General
Gord Mackintosh	New Democratic Party	October 5, 1999	September 21, 2006	Minister of Justice and Attorney General
Dave Chomiak	New Democratic Party	September 21, 2006	November 3, 2009	Minister of Justice and Attorney General
Andrew Swan	New Democratic Party	November 3, 2009	November 3, 2014	Minister of Justice and Attorney General; Minister charged with the administration of The MPI Act
James Allum	New Democratic Party	November 3, 2014	April 29, 2015	Minister of Justice and Attorney General; Minister charged with the administration of The MPI Corporation Act
Gord Mackintosh	New Democratic Party	April 29, 2015	May 3, 2016	Minister of Justice and Attorney General; Minister charged with the administration of The MPI Corporation Act
