= MaryAnn Mihychuk =

Canadian politician

The Honourable MaryAnn Mihychuk PC

Chairwoman of the Standing Committee on Indigenous and Northern Affairs
- In office February 2, 2017 – September 11, 2019
- Preceded by: Andy Fillmore
- Succeeded by: To be elected

Minister of Employment, Workforce and Labour
- In office November 4, 2015 – January 10, 2017
- Prime Minister: Justin Trudeau
- Preceded by: Kellie Leitch
- Succeeded by: Patty Hajdu

Member of Parliament for Kildonan—St. Paul
- In office October 19, 2015 – September 11, 2019
- Preceded by: Joy Smith
- Succeeded by: Raquel Dancho

Member of the Legislative Assembly of Manitoba for Minto 1999–2004 St. James 1995—1999
- In office September 21, 1999 – May 21, 2004
- Preceded by: Riding Created
- Succeeded by: Andrew Swan
- In office April 25, 1995 – September 21, 1999
- Preceded by: Paul Edwards
- Succeeded by: Bonnie Korzeniowski

Personal details
- Born: February 27, 1955 (age 71) Vita, Manitoba, Canada
- Party: NDP (1989–2014); Liberal (2014–present)
- Spouse: Kenneth Marshall (m. 1992)
- Children: 3
- Profession: Geologist

MaryAnn Mihychuk PC (born February 27, 1955) is a Canadian politician from Manitoba. She was elected to the House of Commons of Canada in 2015, representing the riding of Kildonan—St. Paul for the Liberal Party of Canada, and served as Minister of Employment, Workforce and Labour in the federal Cabinet until the January 10, 2017, cabinet shuffle by Justin Trudeau. She lost her seat in the House of Commons in the 2019 Canadian federal election.

She was previously a cabinet minister in the government of Manitoba New Democratic Premier Gary Doer from 1999 to 2004. Mihychuk resigned to run for Mayor of Winnipeg in 2004, but was defeated by Sam Katz.

== Life and career ==
Mihychuk was born in Vita, Manitoba, the daughter of Katherine Salamandyk and Métro Mihychuk. She received the degrees of Bachelor of Arts from the University of Winnipeg in 1979, and Master of Science from Brock University in 1984. She is certified as a Practicing Professional Geoscientist. Mihychuk worked as a geologist in Newfoundland and Labrador from 1984 to 1986 and in Manitoba from 1986 to 1992. In 1992, she married Kenneth Marshall. She has two daughters, Sarah Mihychuk and Hannah Mihychuk, and a son, John.

Mihychuk was first elected as a Winnipeg School Division Trustee first in 1989 and was re-elected in 1992.

=== Provincial politics ===
She was first elected to the Manitoba legislature in 1995, defeating Liberal leader Paul Edwards by 3,109 votes to 2,853 in the Winnipeg constituency of St. James. The 1995 election was won by Gary Filmon's Progressive Conservatives. Mihychuk and 22 other New Democrats formed the Official Opposition.

The NDP won the following general election in 1999. This time Mihychuk was elected in the constituency of Minto, defeating Progressive Conservative Harry Lehotsky by 4,534 votes to 2,035. Gary Doer was sworn in as Premier and named Mihychuk Minister of Industry, Trade and Mines.

Mihychuk was re-elected to the provincial legislature in 2003, winning almost 70% of the votes cast in her constituency. On November 4, 2003, she was named Minister of Intergovernmental Affairs and Trade, with responsibility for International Relations Coordination.

=== Post-provincial politics ===
Mihychuk resigned from cabinet and the legislature on May 21, 2004, to seek election as Mayor of Winnipeg. The 2004 election was held to determine the successor to former mayor Glen Murray. Murray had resigned to seek election to the House of Commons of Canada. Mihychuk's campaign platform focussed on increasing Winnipeg's population. Mihychuk lost this election, winning ten percent of the municipal electorate's vote.

In 2005 Mihychuk relocated to Toronto, Ontario to work for the Prospectors and Developers Association of Canada (PDAC) as Director of Regulatory Affairs.

Mihychuk supported Lorne Nystrom's campaigns to lead the federal New Democratic Party in 1995 and 2003.

=== Federal politics ===
In 2014, Mihychuk was chosen as the Liberal candidate in the riding of Kildonan—St. Paul for the 2015 federal election, defeating the previous Liberal candidate, Victor Andres. Mihychuk said that her views on the economy and social views were closer to those of the federal Liberals. She was subsequently elected to the seat. She was the Minister of Employment, Workforce, and Labour from November 4, 2015, until a cabinet shuffle in January 2017.

She was accused of being abusive and causing confusion by the Canadian Red Cross after visiting a shelter for evacuees from forest fires affecting Garden Hill First Nation in 2018, a formal complaint was filed against her to the federal government. She was accused of adding to the chaos and suggesting to evacuees that they should go to Selkirk, Manitoba, and on her advice 40–50 evacuees waited in the cold with their belongings for transportation to Selkirk that never arrived. Indigenous people had requested her assistance because the Red Cross was ignoring them and placing families in large centre mixed in with a population that had people convicted of sexual offenses. Mihychuk pushed the Red Cross to treat the evacuees with respect and only after advocating were the large centres closed down and the evacuees placed into hotels. While Red Cross officials were upset, the evacuees expressed their satisfaction with the outcome to Indigenous MP Robert-Falcon Ouellette.

== Electoral record ==
2019 Canadian federal election: Kildonan—St. Paul
Party	Candidate	Votes	%	±%	Expenditures
Conservative	Raquel Dancho	19,856	44.8	+4.96	$92,599.19
Liberal	MaryAnn Mihychuk	12,356	27.9	-14.76	none listed
New Democratic	Evan Krosney	9,387	21.2	+6.91	none listed
Green	Rylan Reed	1,777	4.0	+2.22	$0.00
People's	Martin Deck	510	1.2	–	none listed
Christian Heritage	Spencer Katerynuk	304	0.7	-0.41	$2,640.00
Independent	Eduard Hiebert	108	0.2	-0.12	$741.74
Total valid votes/expense limit		44,298	100.0		
Total rejected ballots		222			
Turnout		44,520	67.7		
Eligible voters		65,719			
Conservative gain from Liberal		Swing		+9.99	
Source: Elections Canada

2015 Canadian federal election: Kildonan—St. Paul
Party	Candidate	Votes	%	±%	Expenditures
Liberal	MaryAnn Mihychuk	18,717	42.66	+34.78	–
Conservative	Jim Bell	17,478	39.84	−18.63	–
New Democratic	Suzanne Hrynyk	6,270	14.29	−15.76	–
Green	Steven Stairs	783	1.78	−0.86	–
Christian Heritage	David Reimer	485	1.11	–	–
Independent	Eduard Walter Hiebert	142	0.32	–	–
Total valid votes/Expense limit		43,875	100.00		$196,356.40
Total rejected ballots		161	0.37	–	
Turnout		44,036	71.48	–	
Eligible voters		61,604			
Liberal gain from Conservative		Swing		+26.70	
Source: Elections Canada

29th Canadian Ministry (2015–2025) – Cabinet of Justin Trudeau
Cabinet post (1)
Predecessor	Office	Successor
Kellie Leitch	Minister of Employment, Workforce and Labour; November 4, 2015 – January 10, 2017	Patty Hajdu

Manitoba provincial government of Gary Doer
Cabinet posts (2)
Predecessor	Office	Successor
Rosann Wowchuk	Minister of Intergovernmental Affairs and Trade; November 4, 2003 – May 18, 2004	Rosann Wowchuk
Ministry Created	Minister of Industry, Trade and Mines; October 5, 1999 – November 4, 2003	Scott Smith
