= Steve Ashton =

Canadian politician (born 1956)

Manitoba Minister of Infrastructure and Transportation
- In office April 9, 2015 – May 3, 2016
- Premier: Greg Selinger
- Preceded by: Ron Kostyshyn
- Succeeded by: Blaine Pedersen
- In office November 3, 2009 – December 22, 2014
- Premier: Greg Selinger
- Preceded by: Ron Lemieux
- Succeeded by: Ron Kostyshyn

Manitoba Minister of Intergovernmental Affairs
- In office September 21, 2006 – September 14, 2009
- Premier: Gary Doer
- Preceded by: Scott Smith
- Succeeded by: Ron Lemieux

Manitoba Minister of Water Stewardship
- In office November 4, 2003 – September 21, 2006
- Premier: Gary Doer
- Preceded by: new portfolio
- Succeeded by: Christine Melnick

Manitoba Minister of Labour and Immigration
- In office June 25, 2003 – November 4, 2003
- Premier: Gary Doer
- Preceded by: Becky Barrett
- Succeeded by: Nancy Allan

Manitoba Minister of Conservation
- In office September 25, 2002 – November 4, 2003
- Premier: Gary Doer
- Preceded by: Oscar Lathlin
- Succeeded by: Stan Struthers

Manitoba Minister of Transportation and Government Services
- In office January 17, 2001 – September 25, 2002
- Premier: Gary Doer
- Preceded by: new portfolio
- Succeeded by: Scott Smith

Manitoba Minister of Highways and Government Services
- In office October 5, 1999 – January 17, 2001
- Premier: Gary Doer
- Preceded by: new portfolio
- Succeeded by: poltfolio abolished

Member of the Legislative Assembly of Manitoba for Thompson
- In office November 17, 1981 – April 19, 2016
- Preceded by: Ken MacMaster
- Succeeded by: Kelly Bindle

62nd President of the University of Manitoba Students' Union
- In office 1978–1979
- Preceded by: Roger Nelson
- Succeeded by: Debra Slade

Personal details
- Born: Steven John Ashton; February 29, 1956 (age 70) Surrey, England
- Party: New Democratic Party
- Spouse: Hariklia Dimitrakopoulou-Ashton (1980–)
- Children: Niki Ashton; Alexander Ashton
- Education: University of Manitoba; Lakehead University

Steven John Ashton (born February 29, 1956) is a British-born Canadian politician in Manitoba, Canada. He was a long-serving member of the Legislative Assembly of Manitoba, and was a long-time cabinet minister in the New Democratic Party governments led by premiers Gary Doer and Greg Selinger. He resigned from cabinet on December 22, 2014 to challenge Selinger for the leadership of the party. Ashton was eliminated from the race, after finishing last on the first ballot at the 2015 NDP leadership convention. Selinger was re-elected party leader on the second ballot. In 2017, Ashton ran for Manitoba NDP leader, losing to Wab Kinew, who became premier in 2023.

== Early life ==
Ashton was born in Surrey, England, the son of John Stewart Ashton and Nedra May Childs. His father was born in Wales. He moved with his family, including his brothers Martin and Alan, to Thompson, in northern Manitoba, at age eleven. He was educated at R. D. Parker Collegiate in that community, the University of Manitoba in Winnipeg, and Lakehead University in Thunder Bay, Ontario. He was President of the University of Manitoba Students' Union in 1978–79 and has lectured in Economics for the former Inter Universities North in Thompson and Cross Lake.

== Political career ==
Ashton was first elected to the Manitoba legislature in the 1981 provincial election, defeating Progressive Conservative incumbent Ken MacMaster by 72 votes in the constituency of Thompson. At the time of his first election, Ashton was involved in an INCO strike in the Thompson area as a member of the United Steelworkers of America; he was also the second youngest person ever elected to the Manitoba legislature at the time. He was re-elected in the 1986 election by a greater margin. Ashton did not serve in the cabinet of Howard Pawley.

The NDP were defeated in the provincial election of 1988, although Ashton won his own riding by a comfortable margin. He would later serve as House Leader for the NDP in opposition, and was easily re-elected in the provincial elections of 1990, 1995 and 1999. In 1995, he supported Lorne Nystrom's bid to lead the federal New Democratic Party.

=== Cabinet ===
When NDP leader Gary Doer became Premier of Manitoba in October 1999, Ashton was appointed Minister of Highways and Government Services. On July 4, 2000, he was charged with administration of the Gaming Control Act; his ministry was renamed as Transportation and Government Services on January 17, 2001. Following a cabinet shuffle on September 25, 2002, Ashton became Minister of Conservation (in which capacity he argued for national approval of the Kyoto Accord on climate change). On June 25, 2003, he was also made Minister of Labour and Immigration with responsibility for Multiculturalism and administration of the Worker's Compensation Act.

In 2003, Ashton supported Bill Blaikie's campaign to become leader of the federal NDP.

Ashton was re-elected in the 2003 election with over 82% of the vote in his constituency. On November 4, 2003, he was named as the minister in charge of Manitoba Water Stewardship, a department created after highly publicized water contamination tragedies in Walkerton, Ontario and North Battleford, Saskatchewan.

Ashton was re-elected in the 2007 provincial election and in September 2007 he was appointed Minister of Intergovernmental Affairs and Minister responsible for the Emergency Measures Organization.

On September 4, 2009, Ashton announced his candidacy to succeed Gary Doer as leader of the Manitoba NDP in the 2009 leadership election and ran on a platform advocating the party's return to its social justice and labour roots. Ashton placed second behind Greg Selinger with 34.2% of the vote.

Upon Greg Selinger's election as premier, Ashton was made Minister of Infrastructure and Transportation, with the added responsibilities of Emergency Measures and the administration of the Manitoba Lotteries Corporation Act. He also became the lead minister for Canada-Manitoba Infrastructure programs.

Ashton resigned from cabinet on December 22, 2014 to challenge Selinger in the 2015 Manitoba NDP leadership election, at which he was unsuccessful.

He returned to cabinet in April 2015 as Minister of Infrastructure and Transportation and Minister responsible for emergency measures.

After thirty-four and a half years as an MLA, Ashton lost his seat to Progressive Conservative candidate Kelly Bindle in the April 19, 2016, provincial election.

In 2017, Ashton ran for Manitoba NDP leader, losing to Wab Kinew.

== Personal life ==
In 1979, Ashton married Hariklia "Hari" Dimitrakopoulou; they have two children. His daughter, Niki, is also a politician and served as the federal NDP Member of Parliament for the riding of Churchill—Keewatinook Aski, while his son Alexander was elected chairman of the board of trustees for the School District of Mystery Lake. Ashton is also Secretary of the Canadian Committee for the Restitution of the Parthenon Marbles, seeking the return of the treasured sculptures from Britain to Greece. He speaks Greek, and has written on the political culture of that nation.

== Electoral results ==
=== 2017 leadership convention ===
Candidate	Votes	%
Wab Kinew	728	74.3
Steve Ashton	253	25.7
Total Valid Votes	981	100.00

=== 2015 leadership convention ===
==== First ballot ====
Candidate	Votes	%
Greg Selinger	612	36.02
Theresa Oswald	575	33.84
Steve Ashton	502	29.54
Total Valid Votes	1,699	100.00

Ashton eliminated. Releases his delegates, did not publicly endorse another candidate

=== 2009 leadership convention ===
2009 New Democratic Party of Manitoba leadership election
Candidate	Votes	Percentage
Greg Selinger	1,317	65.75%
Steve Ashton	685	34.20%
Spoiled ballots	1	0.05%
Total	2,003	100.00%

=== Provincial results ===
2016 Manitoba general election: Thompson
Party	Candidate	Votes	%	±%	Expenditures
Progressive Conservative	Kelly Bindle	1,712	44.16	+15.86	$11,544.03
New Democratic	Steve Ashton	1,527	39.39	-29.14	$17,980.87
Liberal	Inez Vystrcil-Spence	638	16.46	+13.28	$7,318.95
Total valid votes/expense limit		3,877	99.13		$32,545.00
Total rejected ballots		34	0.87	+0.39	
Turnout		3,911	37.36	+0.64	
Eligible voters		10,469			
Progressive Conservative gain from New Democratic		Swing		+22.50	
Source: Elections Manitoba

2011 Manitoba general election: Thompson
Party	Candidate	Votes	%	±%	Expenditures
New Democratic	Steve Ashton	2,586	68.52	−5.38	$11,696.80
Progressive Conservative	Anita Campbell	1,068	28.30	+18.17	$16,809.87
Liberal	Ken Dillen	120	3.18	−12.79	$462.91
Total valid votes		3,774	99.53		
Rejected and declined votes		18	0.47	-0.15	
Turnout		3,792	36.72	−3.10	
Registered voters		10,328			
New Democratic hold		Swing		-11.78	

2007 Manitoba general election: Thompson
Party	Candidate	Votes	%	±%	Expenditures
New Democratic	Steve Ashton	3,036	73.90	-8.83	$9,356.43
Liberal	Kenny Braun	656	15.97	+12.07	$7,377.03
Progressive Conservative	Cory Phillips	416	10.13	-3.25	$688.99
Total valid votes		4,108	99.37		
Rejected and declined votes		26	0.63	-0.05	
Turnout		4,134	39.82	+2.28	
Registered voters		10,382			
New Democratic hold		Swing		-10.45	

2003 Manitoba general election: Thompson
Party	Candidate	Votes	%	±%	Expenditures
New Democratic	Steve Ashton	3,291			$9,804.99
Progressive Conservative	Bill Archer	532			$2,448.27
Liberal	Myrle Traverse	155			$627.36
Total valid votes/Expense limit			100.0		$
Eligible voters		–			
Source: Elections Manitoba

1999 Manitoba general election: Thompson
Party	Candidate	Votes	%	±%	Expenditures
New Democratic	Steve Ashton	3,793	70.99	+9.29	$7,846.00
Progressive Conservative	Cecil Thorne	1,306	24.44	+1.94	$20,487.52
Liberal	Pascal Bighetty	244	4.57	-11.22	$2,661.92
Total valid votes		5,343	99.42		
Rejected and declined votes		31	0.58	+0.25	
Turnout		5,374	54.40	−0.47	
Registered voters		9,879			
New Democratic hold		Swing		+3.67	

1995 Manitoba general election: Thompson
Party	Candidate	Votes	%	±%
New Democratic	Steve Ashton	3,619	61.71	+1.78
Progressive Conservative	Chuck Shabe	1,320	22.51	-7.36
Liberal	Tim Johnston	926	15.79	+5.57
Total valid votes		5,865	100.00	
Rejected votes		19		
Turnout		5,884	54.87	
Registered voters		10,724		
Source: Elections Manitoba

1990 Manitoba general election: Thompson
Party	Candidate	Votes	%	±%
New Democratic	Steve Ashton	4,099	59.93	+11.83
Progressive Conservative	Loretta Clarke	2,043	29.87	-2.10
Liberal	Don McIvor	698	10.20	-9.73
Total valid votes		6,840	99.65	
Rejected and declined votes		24	0.35	+0.16
Turnout		6,864	63.05	-10.11
Registered voters		10,887		
New Democratic hold		Swing		+6.97
Source: Elections Manitoba

1988 Manitoba general election: Thompson
Party	Candidate	Votes	%	±%
New Democratic	Steve Ashton	2,992	48.10	-18.51
Progressive Conservative	Ken Collin	1,989	31.97	+6.07
Liberal	Janice Pronteau	1,240	19.93	+12.45
Total valid votes		6,221	99.81	
Rejected and declined votes		12	0.19	-0.08
Turnout		6,233	73.16	+1.66
Registered voters		8,520		
New Democratic hold		Swing		-12.29
Source: Elections Manitoba

1986 Manitoba general election: Thompson
Party	Candidate	Votes	%	±%
New Democratic	Steve Ashton	3,852	66.61	+17.17
Progressive Conservative	Ken Biglow	1,498	25.90	-22.30
Liberal	George Printeau	433	7.49	+5.13
Total valid votes		5,783	99.72	
Rejected and declined votes		16	0.28	-0.03
Turnout		5,799	71.50	-9.14
Registered voters		8,111		
New Democratic hold		Swing		+19.74
Source: Elections Manitoba

1981 Manitoba general election: Thompson
Party	Candidate	Votes	%	±%
New Democratic	Steve Ashton	2,890	49.44	+7.69
Progressive Conservative	Ken MacMaster	2,818	48.20	-6.16
Liberal	Cy Hennessey	138	2.36	-1.54
Total valid votes		5,846	99.69	
Rejected and declined votes		18	0.31	-0.13
Turnout		5,864	80.64	+13.02
Registered voters		7,272		
New Democratic gain from Progressive Conservative		Swing		+6.92
Source: Elections Manitoba
