= Manitoba Advanced Education and Literacy =

Department of Advanced Education and Training
Department overview
- Formed: January 5, 2021
- Preceding agencies: Manitoba Advanced Education, Skills and Immigration; Manitoba Advanced Education and Training
- Jurisdiction: Government of Manitoba
- Headquarters: Winnipeg, Manitoba
- Employees: 125.75 FTE (2010-2011)
- Annual budget: CAD$620 million (2010-2011)
- Minister responsible: Renée Cable, Minister of Advanced Education and Training
- Website: www.edu.gov.mb.ca/ael

Manitoba Advanced Education and Training (formerly the Department of Advanced Education, Skills and Immigration) is the department of the Government of Manitoba responsible for supporting adult learning, post-secondary education, and vocational training in Manitoba.

The department is overseen by the Minister of Advanced Education and Training, who is Renée Cable, as of 18 October 2023.

== Overview ==
In the 2011-2012 Annual Report, the department's stated goal was:

to support high quality adult learning and post-secondary education that meets the needs of all Manitobans.

— Manitoba Advanced Education and Literacy,

The listed acts provide the structure under which the department has operated:

- The Adult Learning Centres Act
- The Adult Literacy Act
- The Advanced Education Administration Act
- The Brandon University Act
- The Colleges Act
- The Université de Saint-Boniface Act
- The Council on Post-Secondary Education Act
- The Degree Granting Act
- The Private Vocational Institutions Act
- The Student Aid Act
- The University College of the North Act
- The University of Manitoba Act
- The University of Winnipeg Act

The Minister of Advanced Education, Skills and Immigration’s 2021 mandate focused on improving Manitobans’ access to post-secondary education, supporting competitive universities and colleges, developing workforce skills, and expanding economic and social opportunities for graduates and immigrants.

== History ==
=== 20th century ===
In 1957, the Directorate of Vocational Education was established under the Department of Education with the responsibility of the administration and coordination of vocational education in Manitoba for both high schools and post-secondary institutions. In 1961, the Brandon Vocational Training Centre (now Assiniboine Community College) opened; followed by the Manitoba Institute of Technology (now Red River College) in 1962. In 1965, construction began for the Northern Manitoba Vocational Centre (now University College of the North) in The Pas. As the community colleges were established and grew, the Directorate focused its resources on planning, construction, and program development for these institutions.

Succeeding the Directorate of Vocational Education in 1968 was the Youth and Manpower Division of the Department of Youth and Education. The creation of this new division reflected the increasing need for technical training in Manitoba as labour demands of the economy grew. The division's mandate was to provide information and resources to assist the development of youth and manpower initiatives in the province, primarily through the operation of the province's three community colleges: Assiniboine Community College (in Brandon), Keewatin Community College (The Pas), and Red River College (Winnipeg). The expansion of these colleges, and their increasing role in provincial labour development, led to the division being renamed in 1970 to the Community Colleges Division (French: Division d'universités de commuauté).

Under the terms of the Universities Establishment Act of 1966, Manitoba's Associate Deputy Minister of Education was given additional responsibilities for University Affairs. In 1967, Brandon College became Brandon University and United College became the University of Winnipeg. That year, the University Grants Commission, which disbursed financial support to these institutions (as well as to the University of Manitoba), was established. University Affairs provided administrative support to the Commission and was responsible for the administration of student financial assistance. Responsibility for student financial assistance, however, would be transferred to the Education Department's Directorate of Instruction and Supervisory Services (now known as Field Services Branch) in 1969.

In 1971, the Department of Colleges and Universities Affairs (French: Département des affaires d'universités) was created by an order-in-council under the Executive Government Organization Act, and assumed all functions of University Affairs. The department also assumed jurisdiction for the Community Colleges Division of the former Department of Youth and Education, and for 2 new divisions: the Youth Secretariat and the Special Projects Division. The latter administered the Manitoba New Careers Program, Inter-Universities Exchange Program, Special Mature Students Program, and the Indian Métis Project for Careers Through Teacher Education (IMPACTE) at Brandon University. From 1971 through 1975, the Minister of the Department of Colleges and Universities Affairs was also the Minister of the Department of Education.

In 1976, the Department of Continuing Education and Manpower (French: Département de formation permanente et de main d'oeuvre) assumed the functions of the Department of Colleges and Universities Affairs, taking on the responsibility for post-secondary education and labour training in Manitoba. The name of this department would reflect the expanded cooperation between the federal and provincial governments regarding labour and 'manpower'. During the 1977/78 fiscal year, the functions of the department were reintegrated with those of the Department of Education.

In 1978, the Community Colleges Division, which belonged to the Department of Colleges and Universities Affairs at the time, once again became a division within the Department of Education. In 1982, it was replaced by the new Post-Secondary, Adult and Continuing Education Division. This new division also integrated branches from the former Program Development and Support Services Division.

In April 1978, the Education Department merged with the Department of Continuing Education and Manpower to form one restructured organization, the Department of Education, that would be responsible for both the public school system and the post-secondary education system in Manitoba. Accordingly, the administrative resources of the two departments were also combined. The new Department of Education would additionally have divisions including the Community Colleges Division, which was responsible for administration of Manitoba's three community colleges; and the Manpower Division, which would later be transferred to the Department of Labour in 1978. This Department of Education would last until 1988.

In 1989, the Manitoba Literacy Office was created and became part of the Post-Secondary, Adult and Continuing Education Division. The following year, the division was renamed Post-Secondary, Adult and Continuing Education and Training, adopting the creation of a new branch to implement a skills training strategy called WORKFORCE 2000. This strategy would be mandated to promote private-sector involvement in Manitoba's human resource development and workplace training.

Also in 1989, the Department of Education and Training (French: Éducation et formation professionnelle) assumed the functions of the former Department of Education, as well as the functions of the Department of Employment Services and Economic Security related to the development and delivery of training programs.

In 1993, the Post-Secondary, Adult and Continuing Education Division would undergo a major reorganization to consolidate skills training initiatives from across the provincial government. Assuming the divisions functions would be the Training and Continuing Education Division, under which skills-training initiatives were consolidated, as the division also took on the functions of the former Employability Enhancement and Youth Programs units within the Department of Family Services, as well as assuming jurisdiction over the Department of Labour's Apprenticeship Branch. Through its various branches, the division was responsible for: "literacy and continuing education programs; workplace-based trade skills and essential skills training; cooperation with private industry in developing training initiatives; administering funding to Manitoba's community colleges; and improving access to training and education for those excluded by location, economic factors, or lack of prior education or experience." With the signing of the Canada-Manitoba Labour Market Development Agreement in 1997, the division was reorganized and its branches assumed responsibilities previously held in Manitoba by the federal government, including: employment insurance-funded employment and training programs; labour market programming; and employment counseling.

In 1994, a second deputy minister was added to the Department of Education and Training and given responsibility for training and advanced education. In 1999, this position was dissolved as part of the transfer of education functions from the Department of Education and Training to the Departments of Education, Training and Youth and of Advanced Education.

=== 21st century ===
In April 2000, the Department of Education, Training and Youth assumed the functions of the Department of Education and Training, followed by the creation of the Department of Advanced Education in January 2001. The two departments, each with its own Minister, shared a single administrative structure and deputy minister, as well as sharing a Training and Continuing Education Division, Administration and Finance Division, Bureau de l'éducation française, and the School Programs Division.

In 2003, the Department of Education, Training and Youth and the Department of Advanced Education were reorganized, establishing the Department of Education and Youth and the Department of Advanced Education and Training. Each department had its own administrative structure, although they still shared a deputy minister as well as the Administration and Finance Division until 2006. The Department of Advanced Education and Training (French: Enseignement postsecondaire et Formation professionelle) took on the functions related to post-secondary institutions and to skills development and training programs. The Department of Advanced Education and Training was mandated under numerous Provincial Acts to administer, set priorities, allocate funds, and provide policy direction to the province's post-secondary and skills-training institutions, including the Universities of Manitoba, Winnipeg, and Brandon, the Collège universitaire de Saint-Boniface, Red River College, Assiniboine College, and Keewatin Community College (as well as its successor).

The Department of Education transferred the responsibility for vocational education and skills training to Advanced Education and Training. Some time in 2006 and 2007, however, the functions of the department were split between:

- the Department of Advanced Education and Literacy, which assumed the functions related to adult learning and literacy, post-secondary education, student financial aid, and vocational education in a school or institutional setting.
- the Ministry of Competitiveness, Training and Trade, which assumed the functions related to vocational education and skills-training in a workplace or industrial setting.

Between 2009 and 2011, Manitoba Education shared various services with Advanced Education and Literacy, including a Financial and Administrative Services branch, the Aboriginal Education Directorate, a Systems and Technology/Innovative Technology branch, and a Human Resource Services branch.

On 18 October 2013, Manitoba Education merged with the Department of Advanced Education and Literacy to form the Department of Education and Advanced Learning, under Minister James Allum. Other responsibilities of Advanced Education and Literacy were divided with the Minister of Multiculturalism and Literacy. Alum was replaced by Peter Bjornson on 3 November 2014, but returned to the office and served until 3 May 2016, when the Department of Advanced Education and Literacy was dissolved.

The Manitoba cabinet was reorganized after the provincial general election of 2016, and the department's responsibilities formed part of the new Education and Training portfolio under the direction of Ian Wishart. In 2021, the Pallister government introduced the new Department of Advanced Education, Skills and Immigration, under the control of Wayne Ewasko.

== Minister of Advanced Education and Training ==
The Minister of Advanced Education and Training is the cabinet minister responsible for Department of Advanced Education and Training.

From 1971 through 1975, the Minister of the Department of Colleges and Universities Affairs was also the Minister of the Department of Education. Diane McGifford served as the first minister of the new "Minister of Advanced Education and Training" portfolio from 21 September 2006 to 28 March 2011.

Ministers responsible for post-secondary, adult, and vocational education in Manitoba
Name	Party	Took office	Left office
Minister of Colleges and Universities Affairs
Saul A. Miller	New Democratic Party	September 9, 1971	August 29, 1973
Ben Hanuschak	New Democratic Party	September 15, 1973 (Note: Hanuschak was the Minister of Education beginning September 9, 1971)	September 22, 1976
Minister of Continuing Education and Manpower
Ben Hanuschak	New Democratic Party	September 22, 1976	October 24, 1977
Keith Cosens	Progressive Conservative Party	October 24, 1977	April 1, 1978
Minister of Education
Keith Cosens	Progressive Conservative Party	April 1, 1978	November 30, 1981
Maureen Hemphill	New Democratic Party	November 30, 1981	April 17, 1986
Jerry Storie	New Democratic Party	April 17, 1986	September 21, 1987
Roland Penner	New Democratic Party	September 21, 1987	May 9, 1988
Minister of Education and Training (Note: The position of "Minister of Education and Training" was changed from "Minister of Education" on April 21, 1989.)
Leonard Derkach	Progressive Conservative Party	May 9, 1988	January 14, 1992
Rosemary Vodrey	Progressive Conservative Party	January 14, 1992	September 10, 1993
Clayton Manness	Progressive Conservative Party	September 10, 1993	March 20, 1995
James C. McCrae	Progressive Conservative Party	February 5, 1999	October 5, 1999
Minister of Advanced Education and Training
Diane McGifford	New Democratic Party	September 21, 2006	January 17, 2000
Minister of Advanced Education and Literacy
Diane McGifford	New Democratic Party	January 17, 2000	March 28, 2011
Erin Selby	New Democratic Party	March 28, 2011	October 18, 2013
Minister of Education and Advanced Learning
James Allum	New Democratic Party	October 18, 2013	November 3, 2014
Peter Bjornson	New Democratic Party	November 3, 2014	April 29, 2015
James Allum	New Democratic Party	April 29, 2015	May 3, 2016
Minister of Education and Training
Ian Wishart	Progressive Conservative Party	May 3, 2016	August 1, 2018
Kelvin Goertzen	Progressive Conservative Party	August 1, 2018	October 23, 2019
Minister of Advanced Education
Wayne Ewasko	Progressive Conservative Party	January 5, 2021	January 18, 2022
Jon Reyes	Progressive Conservative Party	January 18, 2022	January 30, 2023
Minister of Advanced Education and Training
Sarah Guillemard	Progressive Conservative Party	January 30, 2023	October 18, 2023
Renée Cable	New Democratic Party	October 18, 2023	incumbent

== See also ==
- Minister of Education (Manitoba)
- Provincial Nominee Program
- Minister of Labour (Canada)
- Minister of Immigration, Refugees and Citizenship (Canada)
- Alberta Advanced Education
- Ministry of Education (Ontario)
