= Lake Winnipeg algae threat =

Environmental issue in Canada

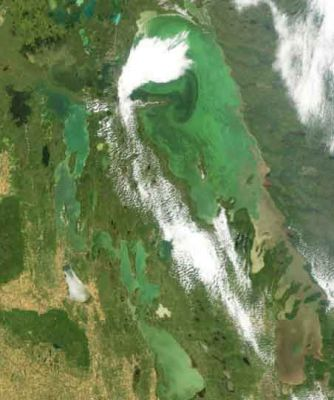
Lake Winnipeg covered in algae blooms. (July 2007)

Lake Winnipeg in Manitoba, Canada, has experienced excessive algae blooms since the 1990s and has been described as "Canada's sickest lake". Toxins released by cyanobacteria in the lake have led to a deterioration of water quality, posing hazards to both human and animal ecosystems. The blooms are caused by high concentrations of nitrogen and phosphorus from fertilizer runoff and sewage draining into the lake via rivers and surface runoff. Algae blooms in Lake Winnipeg have covered half of the lake (over 12,000 square kilometers) and clearly visible from space.

By 2006, Lake Winnipeg's algae blooms were considered to be the worst algae problem of any large freshwater lake in the world, according to Canadian Geographic. The bloom in 2006 covered nearly the entire lake's surface. In 2013, Lake Winnipeg was declared the most threatened lake in the world by the Global Nature Fund, due to excessive levels of phosphorus. Attempts to decrease the levels have been unsuccessful. In 2017, it was reported that a five-year effort removed less than 1% of the phosphorus.

Very high levels of the algae toxin microcystin closed Victoria Beach off from the public in the summer of 2003. Grand Beach and other settlements along the lake are often closed during summer months due to E. coli and algae-toxin-related threats. Immense algae blooms covering hundreds of square kilometers have appeared in the northern part of Lake Winnipeg since the 2010s.

== Social and economic impacts ==
Damage to Lake Winnipeg's ecological balance has had adverse economical effects for the area's $100 million a year tourism industry and $25 million a year fishing industry. The toxins that cyanobacteria release destroy freshwater ecosystems and are dangerous for a wide variety of aquatic and terrestrial species, including humans. Deadly water conditions in prairie dugouts have killed livestock. Commercial and indigenous fishermen on the lake often find their nets disabled during the summer months due to the thick algae conditions.

== Watershed and water supply problems ==
Lake Winnipeg ranks as the 11th largest freshwater lake in the world by surface area. The lake consists of three well-defined regions, the larger North Basin, the smaller South Basin, and the connecting body of water defined as the "Narrows", all of which are greatly affected by algae blooms. The surrounding watershed's drainage basin is roughly forty times larger than the lake's surface area. This ratio is higher than any other major lake in the world, making Lake Winnipeg more susceptible to excessive nutrient levels. Because the lake holds a considerably small volume of water, the water quality is diminished by man made structures and high nutrient loading.
Eutrophication entry points in Lake Winnipeg include:

- The Winnipeg River (E)
- The Saskatchewan River (W)
- The Red River (S)
- Precipitation

Water outflow points in Lake Winnipeg include:

- The Nelson River (NE)

The Red River accounts for roughly 7,716 tonnes of phosphorus draining into Lake Winnipeg per year. Approximately 2,500 tonnes of phosphorus flow out of the lake every year through the Nelson River. It is estimated that incoming phosphorus levels are doubled by agriculture and waste waters from the northern United States. The Saskatchewan River carries phosphorus from Alberta and Saskatchewan into the northwestern part of the lake. The Winnipeg River also nutrient loads the lake from Minnesota and Ontario. The nearby City of Winnipeg does not remove nitrogen and phosphorus from the majority of its wastewater (though upgrades to its sewage treatment plants were underway as of 2017), and these nutrients flow directly into Lake Winnipeg. Due to the washing and filtration techniques used by year-round and seasonal inhabitants along Lake Winnipeg, phosphorus-enriched soapy water can seep into the lake.

== Hydroelectricity ==
A large hydroelectric dam in Grand Rapids, Manitoba, is powered by the Saskatchewan River. The river currents rapidly catch runoff from much of the Canadian prairies, which then flows through a narrow channel eventually spilling into the north side of Lake Winnipeg. The dam is operated by Manitoba Hydro, which operates numerous dams throughout Manitoba that directly affect Lake Winnipeg's water levels and flow rate. The hydroelectric operations along Lake Winnipeg produce hundreds of millions of dollars in revenue every year for Manitoba Hydro. Pressure from provincial authorities and the media has prompted Manitoba Hydro to donate more than $1.35 million over a six-year span to help researchers tackle the constant biological and water quality changes in Lake Winnipeg.

== Chemical and biological problems ==
Environment Canada reports that the amount of nitrogen and phosphorus in Lake Winnipeg has increased dramatically since the 1990's, caused by a massive increase in the use of agricultural fertilizer, burning of fossil fuels, development of large urban populations, and an upsurge in land clearing and deforestation. The increased nitrogen and phosphorus loading from human activity has accelerated eutrophication of certain rivers, lakes, and wetlands, resulting in loss of habitat, changes in biodiversity and loss of recreational potential. The increased nutrients fuel the growth of cyanobacteria which grow rapidly and then die off over the course of an algae bloom. As the cells die and break down, they release cyanotoxins in the surrounding water.

Cyanobacteria blooms frequently persist for several months in Lake Winnipeg until colder temperatures, currents, and changes in the seasonal weather can filter them out. The cyanobacteria's decomposition process consumes oxygen at such a high rate that it can suffocate Lake Winnipeg's native walleye fish species and other aquatic life. Although small amounts of cyanobacteria occur naturally in Lake Winnipeg, there is no conclusive evidence of what normal levels may be. Satellite images show that blooms are occurring more frequently and are covering more surface area of the lake. The Lake Winnipeg algae crisis has grown to such a large scale that the blooms can be seen from outer space.
