= Department of Public Service Delivery (Manitoba) =

Minister of Public Service Delivery
- Ministre de la Prestation des services publics

Agency overview
- Jurisdiction: Government of Manitoba
- Minister responsible: Mintu Sandhu, Minister of Public Service Delivery
- Website: www.gov.mb.ca/central/index.html

The Minister of Public Service Delivery (formerly Consumer Protection and Government Services) is a cabinet position in the Government of Manitoba responsible for consumer protection, public works, and public services.

The Consumer Protection branch is, in essence, concerned with marketplace interactions between consumers and businesses, as well as tenants and landlords.

The other core responsibilities of the department is strategic procurement services, as well as capital planning, project delivery, and asset management for the provincial government's vertical and underground infrastructure.

== History ==
Cabinet responsibilities relating to consumer protection, corporate affairs, procurement, and public services in Manitoba have taken many forms since the formation of the province itself, with specific ministerial designations changing several times. Distinct positions for these responsibilities initially emerged from the offices of Provincial Secretary and Minister of Public Works in the late 1960s.

=== Government Services ===
Upon restructuring via the 1965 Public Works Act, the increasingly service-oriented Department of Public Works transferred responsibilities relating to provincial highways to the new Department of Highways, both under a common ministry. Public Works also become responsible for maintaining and servicing government-occupied buildings and grounds.

Between 1968 and 1969, Public Works was further reorganized to encompass a wider range of services, including the design, construction, acquisition, and maintenance of government buildings and property; the procurement and maintenance of government vehicles and equipment; and the delivery of postal, printing, and information services to the government.

To reflect these significant changes, the department was intended to be renamed the Department of Government Services, but the renaming did not transpire until 1978.

In 1978, the Department of Public Works was dissolved and its responsibilities assumed by a new Department of Government Services. The restructuring also allowed the new department to provide fee-based services, charging different government departments directly for the services provided.

In 1980, Government Services began to administer the Emergency Measures Organization (EMO), and between 1980 and 1982, it also expanded its functions to include responsibility for two independent bodies: the Land Value Appraisal Commission, and the Manitoba Disaster Assistance Board.

In 1999, the Government Services portfolio was merged with that of Highways and Transportation to form a new department called Manitoba Highways and Government Services, and later renamed to Transportation and Government Services in 2001.

Despite the formal merger, the department's Government Services section and Highways and Transportation section continued to operate as distinct entities. The Government Services section continued its responsibilities over efficient and cost-effective provision of central services through infrastructure planning, asset and property management, and supply and procurement services.

In 2006, the Department of Transportation and Government Services was restructured and renamed, becoming the Department of Infrastructure and Transportation. The newly named department continued to be responsible for public services, management of provincial government property, and intragovernmental services.

=== Consumer and corporate affairs ===
==== 1870-2002 ====
Established in 1870 with the formation of the province itself, the Provincial Secretary of Manitoba acted as the registrar general for the province, as well as granting commissions and letters patent of incorporation and granting licenses to non-Manitoban companies seeking to operate within the province.

From 1968 through 1970, John Carroll and Rene Toupin, who held both Provincial Secretary and Public Works responsibilities in different ministries, were recognized as Ministers of Consumer and Corporate Affairs.

In 1969, the Department of Consumer, Corporate, and Internal Services was established. Ben Hanuschak was appointed to succeed Toupin in 1970, as the new Minister of Consumer and Corporate Affairs and Internal Services.

The department's Corporate Affairs Division assumed many of the responsibilities of the Office of the Provincial Secretary after its dissolution in 1970. The division acted as the central registry for information regarding corporations and businesses in Manitoba, responsible for incorporating Manitoba businesses, licensing insurance companies, and collecting particular taxes.

Warner Jorgenson in 1978 was designated as the Minister of Consumer and Corporate Affairs (Consommation et Corporations Manitoba). On November 15, 1979, the department was restructured again as the Ministry of Consumer and Corporate Affairs and Environment.

In 1981, responsibility for the environment was transferred to a different minister and the Department of Consumer and Corporate Affairs was once again established. The department was structured in three main divisions: Administration and Management, Consumer Affairs, and Corporate Affairs.

In 1989, the name of the department was changed to Co-operative, Consumer and Corporate Affairs, upon adopting functions related to the development, promotion, and regulation of cooperatives, credit unions and caisses populaires. The Consumer and Corporate Affairs name was again resumed when Jim Ernst was appointed as minister in 1990, though the department still oversaw cooperative and credit union regulation.

The department was eliminated in September 2002, and its responsibilities folded into the office of Finance Minister Greg Selinger. With this change, the Corporate Affairs Division merged with the Consumer Affairs Division to form the new Consumer and Corporate Affairs Division within the Finance department.

Manitoba was one of the last provinces in Canada to have a separate Consumer and Corporate Affairs ministry.

==== 2009-2016 ====
In 2009, a government-wide departmental reorganization created the new Department of Family Services and Consumer Affairs, assuming functions related to consumer and corporate affairs from the Department of Finance.

The department's Consumer and Corporate Affairs Division took responsibility over the Consumer Protection office, the Financial Institution Regulation Branch, Residential Tenancies Branch, Claimant Advisor Office, the Companies Office, Vital Statistics, and the Property Registry. The Residential Tenancies Commission and the Automobile Injury Compensation Appeal Commission also reported to the department.

In January 2012, the department was renamed the Department of Family Services and Labour, with its responsibilities related to consumer and corporate affairs being transferred to the new Department of Healthy Living, Seniors and Consumer Affairs.

In October 2013, the department was disestablished, with all functions related to consumer and corporate affairs being transferred to the new Department of Tourism, Culture, Sport and Consumer Protection.

In May 2016, after the Progressive Conservatives took government, the department was renamed the Department of Sport, Culture and Heritage, with its consumer protection functions transferred to the Department of Justice.

=== Renewed department (2019-present) ===
In October 2019, the Department of Central Services was created to take over responsibility for capital management of government programs administered by various departments. The Department of Finance transferred all of its branches related to central government services to this new department.

In January 2022, the Department of Central Services became the Department of Labour, Consumer Protection and Government Services, assuming responsibility of all functions related to consumer protection, business services (other than administration of taxes), and labour from the Department of Finance. The new department also took over the Office of the Fire Commissioner and Inspection and Technical Services from the Department of Municipal Relations, as well as responsibility for the restoration of the Legislative Building from the now-defunct Department of Legislative and Public Affairs.

In January 2023, the department was renamed the Department of Consumer Protection and Government Services (CPGS), with the labour portfolio being transferred to the new Department of Labour and Immigration. Minister James Teitsma served under this title until October 2023 provincial election, when the NDP took government and appointed Lisa Naylor as minister.

In November 2024, under the new NDP government, CPGS was renamed the Department of Public Service Delivery, under newly appointed Minister Mintu Sandhu. Responsibilities over digital and technology services transferred to the newly created Department of Innovation and New Technology.

== Agencies ==
The department oversees several special operating agencies:

- Manitoba Education, Research and Learning Information Networks (MERLIN)
- Manitoba Centre for Cyber Security (MCCS)
- Materials Distribution Agency (MDA)
- Vehicle and Equipment Management Agency (VEMA)
- Public Guardian and Trustee
- Vital Statistics

Various offices of the department include:

- Automobile Injury Compensation Appeal Commission
- Consumer Protection Office
- Claimant Advisor Office
- Residential Tenancies Branch
- Residential Tenancies Commission

== List of ministers of consumer and corporate affairs ==
Name	Party	Took office	Left office
John Carroll	Progressive Conservative	September 24, 1968	July 15, 1969
Rene Toupin	New Democratic Party	July 15, 1969	August 20, 1970
Ben Hanuschak	New Democratic Party	August 20, 1970	December 1, 1971
Alvin Mackling	New Democratic Party	December 1, 1971	July 4, 1973
Ian Turnbull	New Democratic Party	July 4, 1973	September 22, 1976
Rene Toupin	New Democratic Party	September 22, 1976	October 24, 1977
Edward McGill	Progressive Conservative	October 24, 1977	October 20, 1978
Warner Jorgenson	Progressive Conservative	October 20, 1978	January 16, 1981
Gary Filmon	Progressive Conservative	January 16, 1981	November 30, 1981
Eugene Kostyra	New Democratic Party	November 30, 1981	August 20, 1982
John Bucklaschuk	New Democratic Party	August 20, 1982	November 4, 1983
Roland Penner	New Democratic Party	November 4, 1983	April 17, 1986
Alvin Mackling	New Democratic Party	April 17, 1986	May 9, 1988
James McCrae	Progressive Conservative	May 9, 1988	April 21, 1989
Edward Connery	Progressive Conservative	April 21, 1989	February 5, 1991
Linda McIntosh	Progressive Conservative	February 5, 1991	September 10, 1993
James Ernst	Progressive Conservative	September 10, 1993	January 6, 1997
Mike Radcliffe	Progressive Conservative	January 6, 1997	February 5, 1999
Shirley Render	Progressive Conservative	February 5, 1999	October 5, 1999
Ron Lemieux	New Democratic Party	October 5, 1999	January 17, 2001
Scott Smith	New Democratic Party	January 17, 2001	September 25, 2002
