= Minister of Industry, Economic Development and Mines (Manitoba) =

The Minister of Industry, Economic Development and Mines is a former ministerial position in the province of Manitoba, Canada.

The position was created in 1999 as the Ministry of Industry, Trade and Mines, taking responsibilities from other departments. Its name was changed in 2003.

The department was eliminated in 2006, and most of its responsibilities were shifted to the new Ministry of Competitiveness, Training and Trade. Some responsibilities were shifted to the Ministry of Science, Technology, Energy and Mines.

== List of ministers of industry, economic development and mines ==
Name	Party	Took office	Left office
MaryAnn Mihychuk *	New Democratic Party	October 5, 1999	November 4, 2003
Scott Smith	New Democratic Party	November 4, 2003	October 12, 2004
Jim Rondeau	New Democratic Party	October 12, 2004	September 21, 2006
