= Manitoba Water Stewardship =

Manitoba Water Stewardship was the department of the Government of Manitoba in charge of regulating several aspects of stewardship of water in Manitoba, including water quality, fisheries, and water-use licensing. Today, water stewardship falls under the Environment and Climate Change portfolio.

== Minister of Water Stewardship ==
The Minister of Water Stewardship was the cabinet minister responsible for Manitoba Water Stewardship. The position was created by Premier Gary Doer in 2003 and dissolved during the new premiership of Brian Pallister in 2016.

Name	Party	Title	Took office	Left office
Steve Ashton	New Democratic Party	Minister of Water Stewardship	November 4, 2003	September 21, 2006
Christine Melnick	New Democratic Party	Minister of Water Stewardship	September 21, 2006	January 13, 2012
Gord Mackintosh	New Democratic Party	Minister of Conservation and Water Stewardship	January 12, 2013	April 29, 2015
Tom Nevakshonoff	New Democratic Party	Minister of Conservation and Water Stewardship	April 29, 2015	May 3, 2016
