= Minister responsible for Multiculturalism (Manitoba) =

The minister responsible for multiculturalism was a government position in the province of Manitoba, Canada. The position was created in 1991, when Bonnie Mitchelson was designated as Minister of Multiculturalism in the government of Gary Filmon. The position was not a full ministerial portfolio and was always held by a member of government with other responsibilities.

In 2012, responsibility for multiculturalism was transferred to the Minister of Immigration and Multiculturalism.

== List of ministers responsible for multiculturalism ==
Name	Party	Took office	Left office
Bonnie Mitchelson	Progressive Conservative	February 5, 1991	September 10, 1993
Harold Gilleshammer	Progressive Conservative	September 10, 1993	January 6, 1997
Rosemary Vodrey	Progressive Conservative	January 6, 1997	October 5, 1999
Becky Barrett	New Democratic Party	October 5, 1999	June 25, 2003
Steve Ashton	New Democratic Party	June 25, 2003	November 4, 2003
Nancy Allan	New Democratic Party	November 4, 2003	November 3, 2009
Flor Marcelino	New Democratic Party	November 3, 2009	January 13, 2012
