= Minister responsible for the Manitoba Telephone System =

The minister responsible for the Manitoba Telephone System was a cabinet position in the Government of Manitoba charged with overseeing the Manitoba Telephone System (MTS). It was not a full portfolio, but was invariably held by ministers with other cabinet responsibilities. The position was created in 1970, and discontinued in 1999.

== List of ministers responsible for the Manitoba Telephone System ==
Name	Party	Took office	Left office
Peter Burtniak	New Democratic Party	August 4, 1970	July 4, 1973
Ian Turnbull	New Democratic Party	July 4, 1973	September 22, 1976
Rene Toupin (*)	New Democratic Party	September 22, 1976	October 24, 1977
Harry Enns	Progressive Conservative	November 15, 1979	January 16, 1981
Donald Orchard	Progressive Conservative	January 16, 1981	November 30, 1981
Leonard Evans	New Democratic Party	November 30, 1981	August 20, 1982
John Plohman (*)	New Democratic Party	August 20, 1982	November 4, 1983
Sam Uskiw (*)	New Democratic Party	November 4, 1983	January 30, 1985
Al Mackling (*)	New Democratic Party	January 30, 1985	December 2, 1986
Gary Doer	New Democratic Party	December 2, 1986	May 9, 1988
Glen Findlay	Progressive Conservative	May 9, 1988	February 5, 1999

- Toupin was designated as minister responsible for the Manitoba Telephone System and Communications.
- Plohman, Uskiw and Mackling were designated as ministers responsible for the Manitoba Telephone System Act.
