= Rene Toupin =

Canadian politician (1934–2014)

Rene Ernest Toupin (May 15, 1934 – March 15, 2014), born in Saint Boniface, Manitoba, was a politician in Manitoba, Canada. He was a New Democratic member of the Legislative Assembly of Manitoba from 1969 to 1977, and served as a cabinet minister in the government of Edward Schreyer.

Toupin was educated at Université Laval, and returned to Manitoba after his graduation. He was the Chair of the La Salle School Board from 1962 to 1966, and Chair of the La Salle Credit Union from 1962 to 1969. He was also a member of the Societe Franco-Manitobaine.

He was elected to the Manitoba legislature in the provincial election of 1969, scoring a relatively easy win in the riding of Springfield. The NDP formed a minority government following this election, and Toupin was named Minister of Consumer and Corporate Affairs on July 15, 1969. On December 18, 1969, he was transferred to the Ministry of Health and Social Development, where he remained for over four years. Toupin was narrowly re-elected in the 1973 election over Progressive Conservative challenger John Vaags.

Toupin held several cabinet portfolios during the Schreyer government's second term in office. He was named Minister of Tourism, Recreation and Cultural Affairs from January 28, 1974, and also became the Minister of Cooperative Development responsible for the Liquor Commission on October 15, 1975. Followed a cabinet shuffle on September 22, 1976, he retained the Cooperative Development portfolio and was named Minister of Consumer and Corporate Affairs for a second time, with responsibility for the Manitoba Telephone System and Communications.

The New Democrats were defeated in the 1977 election, and Toupin personally lost his riding to Tory Bob Anderson by just under 2,000 votes. He did not seek a return to provincial politics after that time. He died on March 15, 2014, at the age of 79.
