= Minister responsible for Emergency Measures (Manitoba) =

The Ministry responsible for Emergency Measures is a government position in the province of Manitoba, Canada. It is not a full ministerial portfolio, and has always been held by a member of the government with other ministerial responsibilities.

The position was created on September 25, 2002, partly in response to the events of September 11, 2001. The current minister responsible for Emergency Measures is Steve Ashton.

== List of ministers of emergency measures ==
Name	Party	Took office	Left office
Scott Smith	New Democratic Party	September 25, 2002	September 21, 2006
Steve Ashton	New Democratic Party	November 3, 2014	December 22, 2014
Ron Kostyshyn	New Democratic Party	December 23, 2014	April 29, 2015
Steve Ashton	New Democratic Party	April 29, 2015	May 3, 2016
