= James McCrae (politician) =

Canadian politician

Member of the Legislative Assembly of Manitoba for Brandon West
- In office March 18, 1986 – September 21, 1999
- Preceded by: Henry Nelson Carroll
- Succeeded by: Scott Smith

Personal details
- Born: September 19, 1948 (age 78) Vancouver, British Columbia, Canada
- Party: Progressive Conservative Party of Manitoba
- Profession: court reporter

James Collus "Jim" McCrae (born September 19, 1948) is a politician in Manitoba, Canada. He served as a member of the Legislative Assembly of Manitoba from 1986 to 1999, in the Progressive Conservative Party caucus. From 1988 to 1999, McCrae was a cabinet minister in the government of Premier Gary Filmon.

== Early life and career ==
McCrae was born in Vancouver, British Columbia. He was educated at Vincent Massey High School in Brandon, Manitoba and the Bryan College of Court Reporting in Los Angeles, California. He served as a court reporter for a number of years and was a Hansard reporter for the House of Commons of Canada from 1975 to 1982. McCrae served as a city councillor for Brandon City Council from 1983 to 1986.

== Provincial politics ==
McCrae was first elected to the Manitoba legislature in the 1986 provincial election, defeating New Democratic Party candidate Arnold Grambo by 1,409 votes in the riding of Brandon West. The NDP under Howard Pawley narrowly won the election, and McCrae joined 25 other Progressive Conservatives in the opposition.

In 1988, the Pawley government was brought down by disgruntled NDP backbencher Jim Walding. The Progressive Conservatives won a minority government in the election that followed; McCrae was re-elected over Liberal candidate John Worley by 1,421 votes, with the NDP falling to third place. On May 9, 1988, McCrae was appointed Attorney General (renamed Minister of Justice and Attorney General) in 1990, Minister of Consumer and Corporate Affairs and Minister of Cooperative Development, with responsibility for Constitutional Affairs and the Liquor Control Act. On April 21, 1989, he was relieved of all his ministries and responsibilities except for the primary portfolio of Attorney-General.

McCrae was easily re-elected in the 1990 provincial election, defeating NDP candidate and future Brandon mayor Shari Decter Hirst. He was kept in the Justice portfolio and once again given responsibility for constitutional affairs and the Liquor Control Act, as well as Corrections and most of The Corrections Act. As Justice Minister, McCrae was responsible for implementing Canada's first administrative licence suspension program for impaired drivers. On constitutional matters, he declared that Manitoba would assist in bringing about aboriginal self-government.

Following a cabinet shuffle on September 10, 1993, McCrae was named as Manitoba's Minister of Health. He was again re-elected without difficulty in the 1995 provincial election. During his time as Health Minister, McCrae made the controversial decision to shut down the emergency rooms in Winnipeg's community hospitals in favour of more centralized E.R. services.

A further cabinet shuffle on January 6, 1997, made McCrae Minister of Environment and Government House Leader, with responsibility for the Manitoba Public Insurance Corporation Act. As Environment Minister, McCrae was criticized by the Sierra Club for refusing to bring in plans to reduce greenhouse gas emissions.

In the final cabinet shuffle of Filmon's government on February 5, 1999, he was named Minister of Education and Training.

Filmon's Conservatives were defeated by the New Democratic Party under Gary Doer in the 1999 provincial election. Notwithstanding his long service in government, McCrae lost Brandon West by 352 votes to Scott Smith of the NDP.

== After provincial politics ==
After leaving the assembly, McCrae became a real estate agent. He ran for mayor of Brandon in 2002, but lost to Dave Burgess. His campaign was hindered by local opposition to some of the decisions he had made while in government. He did not seek re-election to the provincial legislature in 2003.

He was re-elected to Brandon City Council in October 2006 after a 20-year hiatus. He also wrote a book in 2006, Dancing Winds, a romance set during the Second World War at a concentration camp. McCrae was acclaimed to city council in 2010.

In April 2013, McCrae resigned from Brandon City Council. In May, he was named a part-time Citizenship Judge for Winnipeg.

In October 2023, McCrae appeared before Brandon City Council in opposition to a deferred resolution of council recognizing Canadian Indian Residential Schools as genocide, questioning the applicability of the term and argued the motion was ultra vires.

On May 13, 2024, the Brandon School Division Board of Trustees received communications from McCrae regarding the inclusion of the book Grave Error: How The Media Misled Us (and the Truth about Residential Schools) in the division's high school libraries and related concerns. McCrae attempted to speak to the board during the May 13^{th} meeting but the board denied to hear from McCrae, indicating that his delegation request had previously been denied due to an incomplete delegation request form.

McCrae appeared as a delegation to the Brandon School Division Board of Trustees on June 10^{th} 2024 to address disrespectful abuse of him at the May 13^{th} meeting. During McCrae's delegation, three trustees excused themselves from the meeting and the vice-chairperson ruled McCrae's delegation out of order.

McCrae was elected as a trustee for the Brandon School Division in the 2026 Manitoba municipal elections.
