= Minister of Education (Manitoba) =

The Minister of Education is a cabinet minister in the province of Manitoba, Canada. The department's primary responsibility is oversight of Manitoba's public school system.

The Department of Education is one of Manitoba's oldest government departments, although its specific designation has changed several times. It was known as the Minister of Youth and Education from 1968 to 1971, before returning to its original name. On April 21, 1989, it was retitled as the Minister of Education and Training. It was further restructured as the Minister of Education, Training and Youth in 2001, the Minister of Education and Youth in 2002, the Minister of Education, Citizenship and Youth in 2003, and back to the Minister of Education in 2009.

Responsibility for Training was moved to the Ministry of Advanced Education and Training in 2001, and to the Ministry of Competitiveness, Training and Trade in 2006 (renamed the Ministry of Entrepreneurship, Training and Trade in 2010). On May 3, 2016 the Pallister government returned the training portion of the ministry back to education under the name Education and Training.

The current Minister of Education and Early Childhood Learning is Tracy Schmidt.

== List of ministers of education ==
Name	Party	Took office	Left office
Alfred Boyd	No party	March 1873	October 1873
Vacant			
George Coldwell	Conservative	November 14, 1907	May 12, 1915
Robert Thornton	Liberal	May 12, 1915	August 8, 1922
John Bracken	Progressive	August 8, 1922	December 3, 1923
Charles Cannon	Progressive	December 3, 1923	April 21, 1927
Robert Hoey	Progressive	April 28, 1927	1932
Robert Hoey	Liberal-Progressive	1932	September 21, 1936
Ivan Schultz	Liberal-Progressive	September 21, 1936	February 5, 1944
John C. Dryden	Liberal-Progressive	February 5, 1944	December 14, 1948
Charles Rhodes Smith	Liberal-Progressive	December 14, 1948	August 16, 1950
Wallace C. Miller	Liberal-Progressive	August 16, 1950	June 30, 1958
Stewart McLean	Progressive Conservative	June 30, 1958	December 9, 1963
George Johnson	Progressive Conservative	December 9, 1963	September 24, 1968
Donald Craik	Progressive Conservative	September 24, 1968	July 15, 1969
Saul Miller	New Democratic Party	July 15, 1969	September 9, 1971
Ben Hanuschak	New Democratic Party	September 9, 1971	September 22, 1976
Ian Turnbull	New Democratic Party	September 22, 1976	October 24, 1977
Keith Cosens	Progressive Conservative	October 24, 1977	November 30, 1981
Maureen Hemphill	New Democratic Party	November 30, 1981	April 17, 1986
Jerry Storie	New Democratic Party	April 17, 1986	September 21, 1987
Roland Penner	New Democratic Party	September 21, 1987	May 9, 1988
Len Derkach	Progressive Conservative	May 9, 1988	January 14, 1992
Rosemary Vodrey	Progressive Conservative	January 14, 1992	September 10, 1993
Clayton Manness	Progressive Conservative	September 10, 1993	May 9, 1995
Linda McIntosh	Progressive Conservative	May 9, 1995	February 5, 1999
James McCrae	Progressive Conservative	February 5, 1999	October 5, 1999
Drew Caldwell	New Democratic Party	October 5, 1999	September 25, 2002
Ron Lemieux	New Democratic Party	September 25, 2002	November 4, 2003
Peter Bjornson	New Democratic Party	November 4, 2003	November 3, 2009
Nancy Allan	New Democratic Party	November 3, 2009	October 18, 2013
James Allum	New Democratic Party	October 18, 2013	May 3, 2016
Ian Wishart	Progressive Conservative	May 3, 2016	August 1, 2018
Kelvin Goertzen	Progressive Conservative	August 1, 2018	January 15, 2021
Cliff Cullen	Progressive Conservative	January 15, 2021	January 18, 2022
Wayne Ewasko	Progressive Conservative	January 18, 2022	October 18, 2023
Nello Altomare	New Democratic Party	October 18, 2023	January 14, 2025
Tracy Schmidt	New Democratic Party	January 23, 2025	incumbent
