= Rosemary Vodrey =

Canadian politician

Minister of Culture, Heritage and Citizenship
- In office January 6, 1997 – October 5, 1999
- Preceded by: Harold Gilleshammer
- Succeeded by: Diane McGifford

Minister of Justice and Attorney General with responsibility for Constitutional Affairs
- In office September 10, 1993 – January 6, 1997
- Preceded by: James McCrae
- Succeeded by: Vic Toews

Minister of Education and Training
- In office January 14, 1992 – September 10, 1993
- Preceded by: Len Derkach
- Succeeded by: Clayton Manness

Minister responsible for the Status of Women
- In office September 10, 1993 – October 5, 1999
- Preceded by: Bonnie Mitchelson
- Succeeded by: Diane McGifford

Minister responsible for Multiculturalism
- In office January 6, 1997 – October 5, 1999
- Preceded by: Harold Gilleshammer
- Succeeded by: Becky Barrett

Minister charged with administration of the Liquor Control Act
- In office January 6, 1997 – October 5, 1999
- Preceded by: Harold Gilleshammer
- Succeeded by: Diane McGifford

Member of the Legislative Assembly of Manitoba for Fort Garry
- In office September 11, 1990 – September 21, 1999
- Preceded by: Laurie Evans
- Succeeded by: Joy Smith

Personal details
- Born: Rosemary Lynn Webster; October 20, 1949 (age 76) Toronto, Ontario, Canada
- Party: Progressive Conservative
- Education: University of Toronto
- Occupation: School psychologist, politician

Rosemary Lynn Vodrey (born October 20, 1949) is a former Canadian politician in Manitoba, Canada. She was a Progressive Conservative member of the Legislative Assembly of Manitoba from 1990 to 1999 and was a senior cabinet minister of the government of Gary Filmon.

== Early life and career ==
Vodrey was born Rosemary Webster on October 20, 1949, the daughter of senior Toronto police officer Jack Webster. She studied Psychology at the University of Toronto before moving to Winnipeg with her partner. Vodrey later became a school psychologist and lectured in home economics at the University of Manitoba.

She became politically active after befriending Gary and Janice Filmon and sought election to the Manitoba legislature in the 1988 provincial election in the central Winnipeg division of Osborne. She finished third, behind Liberal candidate Reg Alcock and incumbent New Democrat Muriel Smith.

== Member of the Legislative Assembly ==
Vodrey ran for the legislature a second time in the 1990 provincial election and defeated incumbent Liberal Laurie Evans in the Fort Garry division in south-central Winnipeg. The Progressive Conservatives won a majority government, and Vodrey entered the legislature as a government backbencher. She faced a credible challenge from Liberal Jim Woodman in the 1995 provincial election but was re-elected as the Filmon government won a second majority across the province.

== Cabinet minister ==
=== Minister of Education and Training ===
Vodrey was appointed to Filmon's cabinet on January 14, 1992, replacing Len Derkach as Minister of Education and Training. Some criticized Filmon's choice, arguing that Vodrey's decision to send her children to private school made her an inappropriate choice to oversee the public system.

Court decisions

There were two important court decisions relating to education during Vodrey's tenure as Education Minister. In August 1992, a provincial judge determined that a section of the Manitoba Public Schools Act requiring mandatory Christian prayer in the classroom was unconstitutional. Manitoba was the last Canadian province to require prayer in public schools, and Vodrey did not challenge the decision.

In March 1993, the Supreme Court of Canada issued a unanimous decision requiring Manitoba to give exclusive control over French-language education to the province's francophone community. Vodrey welcomed this decision, saying that her government was already proceeding with legislation and promising that a new francophone school division would be in place by September. Manitoba's francophones generally supported the framework plan that was introduced two months later.

Budget cuts

The Filmon government introduced austerity measures on education in 1993, including a $16 million cut to public education funding and a 2% cap on school tax increases. Many parents opposed the cuts, while trustees criticized the cap as an encroachment on the autonomy of their boards. Vodrey later rejected a request from the Manitoba Association of School Trustees (MAST) to introduce wage freezes that would absorb some of the resulting financial burden, though she did agree to a separate proposal that allowed boards not to pay their staff for as many as eight professional development days. Manitoba's universities were also affected by the austerity drive, with officials at the University of Manitoba predicting layoffs and restricted access to some courses. Vodrey's decision to cap tuition increases at 5% was nevertheless described as relatively favourable to student interests.

Vodrey also announced cuts to rural and northern clinician services, as well as the elimination of Manitoba's post-secondary bursary program, a 35% cut to her department's New Careers program, and a 75% surcharge on tuition fees for international students. She argued that the cuts were necessary as part of her government's response to a debt crisis. Some in the media speculated that Finance Minister Clayton Manness, rather than Vodrey, was the primary instigator of this policy.

Other initiatives

Vodrey unveiled a task force report on Manitoba education in April 1993, highlighted by recommendations that the province assume all costs for special-needs children and that parents be given a greater role in education. John Plohman, education critic for the opposition New Democratic Party, welcomed the report but expressed concern that many of its recommendations would never be implemented by the Filmon government.

In July 1993, Vodrey established a provincial commission to review Manitoba's school division boundaries. The five-person commission was headed by former Winnipeg Mayor Bill Norrie and was given 16 months to conduct its research. Some critics expressed concern that the commission's work would lead to fewer and larger divisions.

Vodrey favoured greater cooperation with the federal government to establish national goals and standards for education.

Assessments

In a June 1993 editorial, Winnipeg Free Press columnist Jim Carr described Vodrey as "perhaps the biggest disappointment" in the Filmon cabinet. He characterized her treatment of school boards as "cavalier", and wrote that she had demonstrated little interest in improving the public school system. He later described her as "little more than a messenger of bad news" to school divisions and universities, while also writing that her skills might be better suited to a "less sensitive portfolio".

In 1995, the Winnipeg Free Press reported that the Filmon government had quietly shifted funds away from public and post-secondary education and into private training programs and private schools between 1988 and 1993.

=== Minister of Justice ===
Vodrey was promoted to Minister of Justice and Attorney General on September 10, 1993, with additional ministerial responsibility for Constitutional Affairs and the Status of Women. She was retained in these positions after the 1995 provincial election.

Criminal justice

Vodrey's first major decision as Justice Minister was to call an emergency summit of police, educators and community groups, following the fatal stabbing of a 16-year-old boy in Winnipeg. The summit took place in December and featured diverse opinions on the effectiveness of Canada's Young Offenders Act. Two months after the summit, Vodrey brought forward a crime reform package that included wilderness boot camps for young offenders, increased police surveillance of gangs, violence prevention workshops, a school violence coordinator, and a youth gang and violence phone line that would both receive confidential information and provide counselling services.

Vodrey's proposal for boot camps was controversial. New Democratic Party Justice critic Gord Mackintosh described it as "a simplistic, sensational way of pandering to vengeance", while some social workers argued the camps would actually reinforce criminal behaviour. Aboriginal leaders also expressed concern that these camps could have the same negative effect on native children as did the residential school system and criticized Vodrey for not seeking input from indigenous groups. Others argued that Vodrey's proposal had merit, and deserved to be given a trial run. In response to criticism, Vodrey promised that the camps would be humane and non-abusive, unlike the harsh, military-style youth camps that had been introduced previously in the United States. Vodrey formally opened two camps in September 1994, though opposition critics suggested that her department had simply made minor adjustments to existing youth correction services.

Vodrey also introduced legislation to make parents financially liable for the property offences of their children. Critics questioned the effectiveness of this measure, noting that many of the affected families would already be low-income. The measure was passed by Vodrey's successor, Vic Toews, in 1997.

Vodrey's plan to take driver's licenses from young offenders was less controversial and won the support of the NDP opposition. She later brought forward legislation compelling parents who refuse to pay child support to lose their licenses, joint holdings, and pension credits. The legislation was passed in 1995. Later in the year, Manitoba's acting ombudsman reported that most of its reforms had not yet been implemented, and that no significant change had taken place in the child support system. In early 1996, Vodrey introduced significant fine increases for offences such as speeding and underage drinking.

In February 1995, Vodrey introduced a policy that allowed law enforcement agencies to publicize the names of high-risk sex offenders being released from prisons into Manitoba communities. This was believed to be the first such policy in Canada, and some expressed concern that it could provoke vigilantism. Vodrey also announced changes to the province's prisons in early 1995, including a ban on television during the day, fewer telephone calls, reduced visit time, and a stricter work regimen.

In December 1995, Vodrey launched a provincial task force to make civil courts more responsible, accessible and efficient. Critics noted that the Manitoba Bar Association had already set up a similar task force, which included a member appointed by Vodrey's department.

Relations with the federal government

As provincial Justice Minister, Vodrey often encouraged the federal government to toughen provisions of the Young Offenders Act. In 1994, she proposed that the government publicize the names of young offenders when doing so would increase public safety, lower the age of criminal responsibility below 12 for repeat and "heinous" offenders, and make parents financially liable for the property offences of their children. The government of Alberta supported Vodrey's approach, while Ontario and Quebec favoured more cautious reforms. In early 1995, federal Justice Minister Allan Rock announced that he would accept Vodrey's proposal to name offenders, but would not lower the age of criminal responsibility or make parents liable.

Vodrey suggested several changes to Canada's anti-stalking laws in early 1995, including a reverse-onus bail clause for alleged stalkers, a provision that stalkers who kill their victims be deemed automatically guilty of first-degree murder, and a requirement that persons convicted of stalking submit their weapons and licenses to authorities. Rock's reform package, announced in late 1995, included Vodrey's recommendation for mandatory first-degree murder charges. Vodrey later supported Rock's effort to increase penalties for violent and sexual offenders.

Vodrey opposed the creation of the Canadian gun registry and refused to administer the program in Manitoba.

Judiciary

In December 1993, opposition parties and aboriginal groups called for an independent inquiry into complaints about controversial provincial judge Bruce McDonald. McDonald had been suspended from the bench in May 1993 after the Winnipeg Free Press ran a series of investigative articles into his handling of family law cases, drawing particular attention to prejudiced statements he had made about women and indigenous Canadians. He later resigned from the bench just as a judicial review into his conduct was scheduled to begin. Vodrey argued that McDonald's resignation obviated the need for a public review, and said that further concerns could be raised during a planned overhaul of the judicial council the following year. In December 1994, Vodrey announced that future judicial reviews could be permitted to continue even if the judges in question decide to resign.

The Filmon government imposed ten unpaid Fridays per year on provincial judges as a cost-cutting measure in the early 1990s. Several judges criticized this decision, arguing that it created an unacceptable backlog in the system. In July 1994, the Manitoba Provincial Judges Association filed legal papers alleging that the government had threatened to withhold a pay raise if the judges proceeded with a planned lawsuit over the matter. Vodrey declined to comment, but opposition parties accused the government of treating judges like civil servants.

Vodrey appointed Judith Webster as Chief Justice of the Provincial Court of Manitoba in December 1993. Webster was the first woman to hold this position.

Other

In February 1994, the federal and provincial governments joined with indigenous groups to establish a new funding formula for police services in aboriginal communities. In supporting the pact, Vodrey said that it would allow aboriginal input into the allocation of funds. Critics noted that it did not provide for the immediate restoration of native-run police agencies, most notably the Dakota Ojibway Tribal Council (DOTC) force that had been dismantled the previous year. Later in the year, Vodrey signed an interim agreement to provide for the DOTC force's return.

Vodrey announced a provincial gun amnesty program in May 1994, in which Manitobans were encouraged to turn in illegal firearms without fear of arrest. The project yielded 500 weapons, including explosives and three machine guns. Later in the same year, Vodrey granted the Brandon police force permission to carry semi-automatic handguns.

On October 23, 1995, Vodrey gave Winnipeg Mayor Susan Thompson $2 million to hire forty new police officers for the city. Some skeptics noted that this event took place two days before the 1995 municipal election, in which Thompson was facing a difficult challenge from two rival candidates. Vodrey denied there was any attempt to influence the outcome of the vote.

Vodrey commissioned a civil justice review task force in early 1996, to review the province's handling of divorce and child-custody cases and to prevent damage being done to spouses, children and families.

Headingley Jail Riot

A serious riot broke out at Manitoba's Headingley Correctional Institution on April 25, 1996. Eight guards and about forty prisoners were injured, some seriously, as a group of inmates ransacked parts of the jail for the better part of a day. By the end of the riot, the prison had no heat or electricity and the actual building was largely destroyed. Several guards later complained that staff cutbacks and unsafe working conditions were ongoing concerns in the period leading up to the violence.

Vodrey announced an independent review into the riot but rejected requests for a full-scale public inquiry. Prison guards across the province subsequently went on a three-day strike, seeking both an inquiry and the resignation of several officials responsible for overseeing the prison, including Vodrey. The opposition New Democratic Party also criticized Vodrey's response to the crisis, arguing that she was not forthcoming about the number of prisoners released from other prisons to alleviate overcrowding when inmates were transferred from Headingley. These criticisms were reduced somewhat after Vodrey appointed respected former judge Ted Hughes to conduct the inquiry.

Hughes submitted a report in December 1996 that described Headingley as having been a social powder keg before the riot, with serious problems in both safety and labour relations. He also described Vodrey as "surprisingly" ignorant of these problems in her capacity as minister. Vodrey accepted responsibility and expressed regret that she did not know of the prevailing circumstances at the prison.

Assessments

Vodrey became known for making high-profile policy announcements during her time in the Justice portfolio, and there was some speculation she would eventually be a candidate to succeed Gary Filmon as leader of the Progressive Conservative Party. This speculation ended after the Headingly riot, which did serious damage to her political standing. Some Winnipeg Free Press journalists noted that street gangs and juvenile crime actually increased during the period of Filmon and Vodrey's hardline approach.

=== Minister of Culture, Heritage and Citizenship ===
Vodrey was reassigned as Minister of Culture, Heritage and Citizenship on January 6, 1997. She retained ministerial responsibility for the Status of Women and was also given responsibility for Multiculturalism and the Liquor Control Act.

In June 1997, Vodrey introduced legislation to change Manitoba's access to information rules for the provincial and municipal governments and crown corporations. She also brought forward a companion bill for the protection of personal health records, which was intended to allow Manitoba's public health system to be transferred online. Some doctors expressed concern about the latter measure, arguing that patient privacy could not be ensured. The access to information bill was expected to be less controversial but was nonetheless met with opposition from journalists and others who argued that it would reduce public access to government files, and to electronic files in particular. Vodrey revised the bill in response to this criticism.

Vodrey announced several cultural grants in the summer of 1997, including $1.5 million to the Franco-Manitoban Heritage Centre and $400,000 to the Portage Community Centre Inc. In June 1998, she appointed a Ministerial Millennium Advisory Committee to advise on the best ways of celebrating the millennium. Vodrey changed the governance structure of Manitoba Film and Sound in late 1998, establishing a nine-member board appointed by the provincial government. One of her final acts in office was to oversee a financial bailout of the Winnipeg Symphony Orchestra.

Vodrey also oversaw Manitoba's immigration policy during her time as Minister of Culture. In 1998, the province received a $7 million funding increase for immigration from the federal government and was given a direct role in recruitment strategies. In early 1998, Vodrey and three other politicians were awarded robes of honour from Winnipeg's Sikh community.

=== Minister responsible for the Status of Women ===
In 1995, Vodrey introduced a $50,000 scholarship program for women entering high-technology fields at Manitoba community colleges. Female enrollment in these programs was very low at the time. In the same year, she was an official observer at the United Nations Fourth World Conference on Women in Beijing, China. She announced an anti-stalking initiative in 1996, allowing Manitobans to remove their names from provincial land title documents as a means of keeping their addresses confidential.

In 1996, journalist Lindor Reynolds wrote that Vodrey had a mixed record of effectiveness on women's issues. Reynolds noted that Manitoba's domestic abuse committee, started by former Justice Minister Jim McCrae, was shut down after Vodrey became Justice Minister in 1993. However, she commended Vodrey for releasing a 50-page guide entitled "Stop The Violence" that was used by women's shelters, crisis workers, doctor's offices and counsellors.

=== Minister responsible for the Manitoba Liquor Control Commission ===
Vodrey introduced a review of the province's four existing private wine stores in May 1997. The following year, she announced that the Filmon government would begin licensing private sales throughout the province. Jim Maloway of the New Democratic Party described this as "privatization by stealth", and expressed concern that the province would eventually privatize the Liquor Control Commission.

== Federal politics ==
Vodrey was co-chair of Kim Campbell's Manitoba campaign in 1993, during her ultimately successful bid to succeed Brian Mulroney as leader of the Progressive Conservative Party of Canada.

== Out of politics ==
Vodrey announced in March 1999 that she would not be a candidate in the next provincial election. She formally resigned from cabinet with the rest of the Filmon ministry on October 5, 1999, following the appointment of an NDP government that formalized the result of the election. She supported Stuart Murray's successful bid to succeed Gary Filmon as Progressive Conservative leader in 2000, and later endorsed Hugh McFadyen's successful campaign to succeed Murray in 2006. She supported Sam Katz's campaign for re-election as Mayor of Winnipeg in 2006.

Vodrey was appointed to a two-year term on the Board of Directors of the Royal Winnipeg Ballet in 2002 and was re-appointed in 2004, 2006 and 2008. She has also served on the board of the Misericordia Health Centre (MHC) Foundation. In 2003, Vodrey took part in a seminar entitled "Election Readiness for Women".

She was appointed as the Manitoba-Saskatchewan representative on the Canada Council for the Arts in April 2009.

== Electoral record ==
1995 Manitoba general election: Fort Garry
Party	Candidate	Votes	%	±%	Expenditures
Progressive Conservative	Rosemary Vodrey	5,959	48.29	1.22	$32,899.54
Liberal	Jim Woodman	4,434	35.93	-0.88	$34,086.38
New Democratic	Brock Holowachuk	1,857	15.05	1.22	$1,399.00
Libertarian	Alex Pressey	91	0.74	–	$124.74
Total valid votes		12,341	–	–	
Rejected		53	–		
Eligible voters / turnout		17,418	71.16	-1.80	
Source(s) Source: Manitoba. Chief Electoral Officer (1999). Statement of Votes for the 37th Provincial General Election, September 21, 1999 (PDF) (Report). Winnipeg: Elections Manitoba.

1990 Manitoba general election: Fort Garry
Party	Candidate	Votes	%	±%
Progressive Conservative	Rosemary Vodrey	5,105	47.07	7.27
Liberal	Laurie Evans	3,992	36.81	-9.77
New Democratic	Shirley Lord	1,500	13.83	1.88
Western Independence	Jan Mandseth	249	2.30	0.96
Total valid votes		10,846	–	–
Rejected		17	–	
Eligible voters / turnout		14,890	72.96	-5.26
Progressive Conservative gain from Liberal		Swing		+8.52
Source(s) Source: Manitoba. Chief Electoral Officer (1999). Statement of Votes for the 37th Provincial General Election, September 21, 1999 (PDF) (Report). Winnipeg: Elections Manitoba.

1988 Manitoba general election: Osborne
Party	Candidate	Votes	%	±%
Liberal	Reg Alcock	4,334	44.90	
New Democratic	Muriel Smith	2,753	28.52	
Progressive Conservative	Rosemary Vodrey	2,421	25.08	
Libertarian	Clancy Smith	145	1.50	
Turnout		9,691	78.85	
Liberal gain		Swing		
Source: Elections Manitoba
