= Rosann Wowchuk =

Canadian politician (born 1945)

Manitoba Minister of Finance
- In office November 3, 2009 – October 3, 2011
- Premier: Greg Selinger
- Preceded by: Greg Selinger
- Succeeded by: Stan Struthers

4th Deputy Premier of Manitoba
- In office June 6, 2003 – October 3, 2011 Serving with Eric Robinson from 2009
- Premier: Gary Doer; Greg Selinger
- Preceded by: Jean Friesen
- Succeeded by: Eric Robinson

Manitoba Minister of Agriculture, Food and Rural Initiatives
- In office November 4, 2003 – November 3, 2009
- Premier: Gary Doer
- Preceded by: new portfolio
- Succeeded by: Stan Struthers

Manitoba Minister of Agriculture and Food
- In office October 5, 1999 – November 4, 2003
- Premier: Gary Doer
- Preceded by: new portfolio
- Succeeded by: portfolio abolished

Member of the Legislative Assembly of Manitoba for Swan River
- In office September 11, 1990 – October 20, 2011
- Preceded by: Parker Burrell
- Succeeded by: Ron Kostyshyn

Personal details
- Born: Rosann Harapiak; August 15, 1945 (age 81) Cowan, Manitoba
- Party: New Democratic Party
- Education: Manitoba Teacher's College
- Occupation: Teacher, farmer

Rosann Wowchuk (née Harapiak; born August 15, 1945) is a former Manitoba politician, and was a cabinet minister in the New Democratic Party governments of Premiers Gary Doer and Greg Selinger.

The daughter of William Harapiak and Mary Philipchuk, she was born Rosann Harapiak in Cowan, Manitoba. She attended Manitoba Teacher's College, and subsequently worked as a teacher and farmer. In 1968, she married Sylvestor Wowchuk. She served as a municipal councillor and deputy reeve in the mid-northern community of Swan River from 1983 to 1990. Her brothers, Leonard and Harry Harapiak, were both NDP cabinet ministers during the 1980s.

Wowchuk was first elected to the Manitoba Legislature in the 1990 provincial election, defeating incumbent Progressive Conservative Parker Burrell in the riding of Swan River. She was re-elected in the 1995 election, defeating Tory candidate Fred Betcher by only 36 votes. There are many who believe that Independent Native Voice candidate Nelson Contois, who received 118 votes, was encouraged to run by local Tory organizers in an attempt to split the riding's left-of-centre vote. Also in 1995, Wowchuk supported Lorne Nystrom's campaign to become leader of the federal New Democratic Party.

After spending nine years as an opposition MLA, Wowchuk moved to the government benches in 1999 after Gary Doer's NDP won a parliamentary majority. She was appointed Minister of Agriculture and Food on October 5, 1999, and held this portfolio for the entirety of the Doer government's first term. In 2003, she supported Bill Blaikie's campaign to become leader of the federal NDP.

Wowchuk was easily re-elected in the provincial election of 2003, and was named deputy premier three days later. Retaining the agriculture portfolio, she was given ministerial responsibility for Intergovernmental Affairs and Cooperative Development on June 25. On November 4, the name of her ministry was changed to Agriculture, Food and Rural Initiatives, and she was relieved of responsibilities for Intergovernmental Affairs.

Although Wowchuk opposed the decision of Gary Filmon's government to eliminate the "single-desk" marketing of hog farms, she did not reverse the policy upon joining government. In 2004, she rejected a request from the Manitoba Cattle Producers that all livestock animals killed in a proposed Winnipeg plant be tested for BSE.

Wowchuk was also named acting Minister of Intergovernmental Affairs and Trade on May 18, 2004, following the resignation of Mary Ann Mihychuk. She retained this position until October 22, 2004.

Wowchuk was re-elected in the 2007 provincial election. On July 4, 2011, she announced that she will not run in the next provincial election.

Wowchuk is not related to current Swan River MLA Rick Wowchuk, despite the fact that the two share the same surname.
