= Manitoba Economic Development, Investment and Trade =

Manitoba Business, Mining, Trade and Job Creation.
- Ministère du développement économique, de l’investissement et du commerce

Agency overview
- Formed: 2019
- Preceding agency: Department of Economic Development, Investment, Trade and Natural Resources. Department of Economic Development, Investment and Trade. Department of Economic Development and Jobs
- Employees: 409 FTEs (2021/22)
- Minister responsible: Jamie Moses, Minister of Business, Mining, Trade and Job Creation.
- Deputy Minister responsible: Dana Rudy
- Child agencies: Industrial Technology Centre; Manitoba Development Corp

Manitoba Business, Mining, Trade and Job Creation (BMTJC; French: Ministère du développement économique, de l’investissement et du commerce; formerly Economic Development, Investment, Trade and Natural Resources) is the provincial government department responsible for economic growth and the creation of jobs in Manitoba.

The department was created in late 2019 out of the former Department of Growth, Enterprise and Trade. The portfolio is overseen by the Minister of Business, Mining, Trade and Job Creation. Who is currently Jamie Moses.

== History ==
The Department of Competitiveness, Training and Trade was established in 2006, combining responsibilities from the portfolios of Industry, Economic Development and Mines, Intergovernmental Affairs and Trade, and Advanced Education and Training. At the time, Premier Gary Doer announced that the ministry was the first of its kind in Canada, noting that it combined taxation concerns with long-term strategies for education and training.

The department was renamed to Entrepreneurship, Training and Trade in 2009, and to Jobs and the Economy in October 2013.

In 2016, the Department of Growth, Enterprise and Trade (GET) was created when the Jobs and the Economy portfolio combined with that of the Ministry of Mineral Resources, as well as taking on the transportation responsibilities of the former Ministry of Infrastructure and Transportation, and the northern economic development responsibilities of the Ministry of Aboriginal and Northern Affairs.

On 23 October 2019, the Department of Growth, Enterprise and Trade became the Department of Economic Development and Training. As result, GET's resource development division merged with the agriculture ministry to form the new Ministry of Agriculture and Resource Development; the labour and regulatory services division was transferred to Manitoba Finance; and the Office of the Fire Commissioner was transferred to Manitoba Municipal Relations.

In January 2021, the portfolio was renamed to the Department of Economic Development and Jobs. The department was renamed again the following year, on January 18, to Economic Development, Investment and Trade (EDIT).

== Ministers ==
Name	Party	Took office	Left office
Minister of Competitiveness, Training and Trade
Scott Smith	New Democratic Party	September 21, 2006	May 22, 2007
Jim Rondeau	New Democratic Party	June 28, 2007	February 4, 2008
Andrew Swan	New Democratic Party	February 4, 2008	November 3, 2009
Minister of Entrepreneurship, Training and Trade
Peter Bjornson	New Democratic Party	November 3, 2009	October 18, 2013
Minister of Jobs and the Economy
Theresa Oswald	New Democratic Party	October 18, 2013	November 3, 2014
Kevin Chief	New Democratic Party	November 3, 2014	May 3, 2016
Minister of Growth, Enterprise and Trade
Cliff Cullen	Progressive Conservative	May 3, 2016	August 17, 2017
Blaine Pedersen	Progressive Conservative	August 17, 2017	October 23, 2019
Minister of Economic Development and Training
Ralph Eichler	Progressive Conservative	October 23, 2019	January 5, 2021
Minister of Economic Development and Jobs
Ralph Eichler	Progressive Conservative	January 5, 2021	July 15, 2021
Jon Reyes	Progressive Conservative	July 15, 2021	January 18, 2022
Minister of Economic Development, Investment and Trade
Cliff Cullen	Progressive Conservative	January 18, 2022	January 30, 2023
Jeff Wharton	Progressive Conservative	January 30, 2023	October 17, 2023
Minister of Economic Development, Investment, Trade and Natural Resources
Jamie Moses	New Democratic Party	October 18, 2022	November 13, 2024
Minister of Business, Mining, Trade and Job Creation
Jamie Moses	New Democratic Party	November 13, 2024	Present

== See also ==
- Manitoba Advanced Education, Skills and Immigration
