= Minister charged with the administration of The Manitoba Lotteries Corporation Act =

Canadian provincial government position

The Minister charged with the administration of The Manitoba Lotteries Corporation Act is a government position in the province of Manitoba, Canada. It is not a full ministerial portfolio, and is always held by a member of government with other responsibilities.

From January 16, 1981, to November 4, 1983, the minister was designated as responsible for the Lotteries and Gaming Control Act.

The current minister is Greg Selinger.

== List of ministers charged with the administration of The Manitoba Lotteries Corporation Act ==
Name	Party	Took office	Left office
Laurent Desjardins	New Democratic Party	January 8, 1975	October 24, 1977
Edward McGill	Progressive Conservative	October 24, 1977	November 15, 1979
Robert Banman	Progressive Conservative	November 15, 1979	November 30, 1981
Laurent Desjardins	New Democratic Party	November 30, 1981	January 30, 1985
Eugene Kostyra	New Democratic Party	January 30, 1985	April 17, 1986
Judy Wasylycia-Leis	New Democratic Party	April 17, 1986	May 9, 1988
Bonnie Mitchelson	Progressive Conservative	May 9, 1988	September 10, 1993
Jim Ernst	Progressive Conservative	September 10, 1993	May 9, 1995
Eric Stefanson	Progressive Conservative	May 9, 1995	February 5, 1999
Darren Praznik	Progressive Conservative	February 5, 1999	October 5, 1999
Diane McGifford	New Democratic Party	October 5, 1999	September 25, 2002
Scott Smith	New Democratic Party	September 25, 2002	June 2007
Greg Selinger	New Democratic Party	June 2007	February 4, 2008

Source: (with corrections from the Canadian Parliamentary Guide)
