= Minister of Local Government (Manitoba) =

The Minister of Local Government is a cabinet minister in the province of Manitoba, Canada. The position was created in 1999 as the Minister of Intergovernmental Affairs. The portfolio was designated as Intergovernmental Affairs and Trade from November 2003 to September 2006, when responsibility for trade was shifted to the new portfolio of Competitiveness, Training and Trade. Then, the portfolio went back to being called Intergovernmental Affairs. In November 2009, when Greg Selinger became Premier, the portfolio was renamed Local Government. In October 2013, it was renamed Municipal Government, and was then renamed Municipal Relations in 2014. In 2023, the responsibility for Northern relations was transferred from Manitoba Indigenous Reconciliation to Municipal Relations.

== List of ministers ==
=== Intergovernmental affairs ===
Name	Party	Took office	Left office
Jean Friesen	New Democratic Party	October 5, 1999	June 25, 2003
Rosann Wowchuk	New Democratic Party	June 25, 2003	November 4, 2003
MaryAnn Mihychuk^{*}	New Democratic Party	November 4, 2003	May 18, 2004
Rosann Wowchuk (acting)^{*}	New Democratic Party	May 18, 2004	October 12, 2004
Scott Smith^{*}	New Democratic Party	October 12, 2004	September 21, 2006
Steve Ashton	New Democratic Party	September 21, 2006	September 14, 2009

- The Minister responsible for International Relations Coordination existed from 2003 to 2006. Rather than a full portfolio position, it was concurrently held by the Minister of Intergovernmental Affairs.

=== Local government ===
Name	Party	Took office	Left office
Ron Lemieux	New Democratic Party	November 3, 2009	October 18, 2013

=== Municipal government ===
Name	Party	Took office	Left office
Stan Struthers	New Democratic Party	October 18, 2013	November 3, 2014

=== Municipal relations ===
Name	Party	Took office	Left office
Jeff Wharton	Progressive Conservative	3 May 2016	23 October 2019
Rochelle Squires	Progressive Conservative	23 October 2019	5 January 2021
Derek Johnson	Progressive Conservative	5 January 2021	18 January 2022
Eileen Clarke	Progressive Conservative	18 January 2022	30 January 2023
Andrew Smith	Progressive Conservative	30 January 2023	18 October 2023

=== Municipal and Northern relations ===
Name	Party	Took office	Left office
Ian Bushie	New Democratic	18 October 2023	13 November 2024
Glen Simard	New Democratic	13 November 2024	present
