= 44th Manitoba general election =

Provincial election

- On or before October 5, 2027

57 seats of the Legislative Assembly of Manitoba 29 seats are needed for a majority
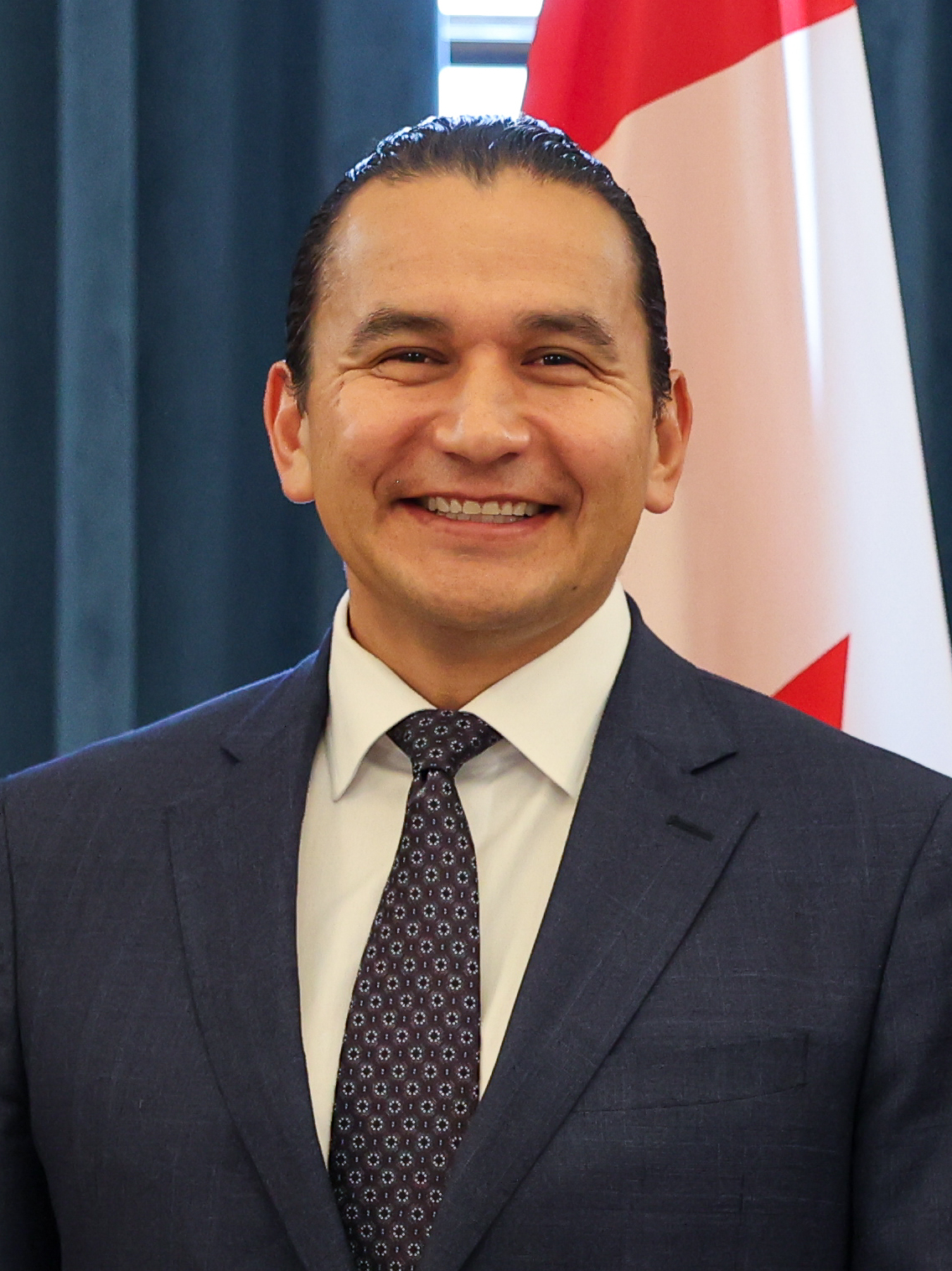

			LIB
Leader	Wab Kinew	Konrad Narth (interim)	Willard Reaves
Party	New Democratic	Progressive Conservative	Liberal
Leader since	September 16, 2017	September 29, 2026	September 29, 2025
Leader's seat	Fort Rouge	La Vérendrye	Running in River Heights
Last election	34 seats, 45.63%	22 seats, 41.86%	1 seat, 10.63%
Current seats	34	19	1
Seats needed	Steady	▲10	▲28
Incumbent premier
Wab Kinew
New Democratic

The 44th Manitoba general election will be held on or before October 5, 2027, to elect 57 members to the Legislative Assembly of Manitoba.

== Background ==
Under Manitoba's Elections Act, a general election must be held no later than the first Tuesday of October in the fourth calendar year following the previous election. As the previous election was held in 2023, the latest possible date for the election is October 5, 2027. The election will be held under first-past-the-post voting.

=== Current standings ===
43rd Manitoba Legislature – Movement in seats held up to the election (2023-present)
Party	2023	Gain/(loss) due to				Current
Party	2023	Resignation or death of MLA	Left Caucus	Removed from caucus	By-election	Current
New Democratic	34	(2)		(1)	3	34
Progressive Conservative	22	(2)	(1)		1	20
Liberal	1					1
Independent	–		1	1		2
Total	57	(4)		–	4	57

=== Incumbents not standing for re-election ===
Electoral district	MLA	Date announced
Turtle Mountain	Doyle Piwniuk	November 12, 2025
Steinbach	Kelvin Goertzen	December 10, 2025
Springfield-Ritchot	Ron Schuler	December 17, 2025
Selkirk	Richard Perchotte	March 5, 2026
Red River North	Jeff Wharton	May 7, 2026

== Timeline ==
Changes in seats held (2023–present)
Seat	Before				Change		
Seat	Date	Member	Party	Reason	Date	Member	Party
Tuxedo	May 6, 2024	Heather Stefanson	█ PC	Resignation	July 8, 2024	Carla Compton	█ New Democratic
Fort Garry	September 16, 2024	Mark Wasyliw	█ New Democratic	Removed from caucus			█ Independent
Transcona	January 14, 2025	Nello Altomare	█ New Democratic	Died in office	March 18, 2025	Shannon Corbett	█ New Democratic
Spruce Woods	March 24, 2025	Grant Jackson	█ PC	Resigned to run federally	August 26, 2025	Colleen Robbins	█ PC
Dawson Trail	March 10, 2026	Bob Lagassé	█ PC	Left PC Caucus			█ Independent
The Pas-Kameesak	March 21, 2026	Amanda Lathlin	█ New Democratic	Died in office	July 21, 2026	Jennifer Flett	█ New Democratic
Fort Whyte	September 29, 2026	Obby Khan	█ PC	Left PC Caucus			█ Independent

=== 2023 ===
- October 3: The 2023 Manitoba general election is held, resulting in a majority for the New Democratic Party. The Progressive Conservative Party becomes the Official Opposition, and the Liberal Party is reduced to one seat. PC leader Heather Stefanson announced her intent to resign once her successor is chosen, while she will remain as MLA for Tuxedo. Dougald Lamont resigns as Liberal leader on election night after he loses his seat of Saint Boniface.
- October 17: Cindy Lamoureux, MLA for Tyndall Park, is selected as interim leader of the Manitoba Liberal Party.
- October 18: The Kinew ministry is sworn in.

=== 2024 ===
- January 15: Heather Stefanson resigns as Leader of the Progressive Conservative Party
- January 18: Wayne Ewasko is chosen as the interim leader of the Progressive Conservative Party, replacing outgoing leader Heather Stefanson.
- April 25: Heather Stefanson announces her intention to vacate her seat on May 6. A by-election was held to fill the seat on June 18.
- May 6: Heather Stefanson Resigns as the MLA for Tuxedo
- June 18: New Democrat Carla Compton wins the Tuxedo by-election, gaining the seat from the Progressive Conservatives.
- September 16: Mark Wasyliw, MLA for Fort Garry, is removed from the NDP caucus and will sit as an independent.

=== 2025 ===
- January 14: Education and Early Childhood Learning Minister and MLA for Transcona Nello Altomare dies in office.
- January 23: Tracy Schmidt becomes Minister of Education and Early Childhood Learning, and Riel MLA Mike Moyes becomes Minister of Environment and Climate Change.
- March 18: New Democrat Shannon Corbett wins the Transcona by-election, holding the seat for the NDP and becomes the first Woman to be elected the MLA for Transcona.
- March 24: Progressive Conservative MLA for Spruce Woods, Grant Jackson resigns his seat to run for the federal Conservatives in Brandon—Souris.
- April 26: Obby Khan is elected as leader of the Progressive Conservative Party.
- August 26: Progressive Conservative Colleen Robbins wins the Spruce Woods by-election, holding the seat for the Progressive Conservatives.
- September 29: Willard Reaves is acclaimed as leader of the Liberal Party.
- November 12: Progressive Conservative MLA for Turtle Mountain, Doyle Piwniuk announces he will not seek re-election in the 44th General Election.
- December 10: Progressive Conservative MLA for Steinbach and 23rd Premier of Manitoba Kelvin Goertzen announces he will not seek re-election in the 44th General Election.
- December 17: Progressive Conservative MLA for Springfield-Ritchot and former Cabinet Minister Ron Schuler announces he will not seek re-election in the 44th General Election.

=== 2026 ===
- March 5: One term Progressive Conservative MLA for Selkirk Richard Perchotte will not seek re-election in the 44th General Election.
- March 10: Progressive Conservative MLA for Dawson Trail Bob Lagassé announces in the legislature that he is leaving the PC Caucus and will sit as an independent as well as run as an independent in the 44th Manitoba General Election.
- March 21: NDP MLA for The Pas-Kameesak Amanda Lathlin, the first First Nations woman ever elected in Manitoba, dies in office.
- July 21: New Democrat Jennifer Flett wins the The Pas-Kameesak by-election, holding the seat for the NDP.
- September 28: Obby Khan resigns as the leader of Progressive Conservative Party.
- September 29: Konrad Narth becomes interim Progressive Conservative leader. Obby Khan resigns as a PC party member, becoming an independent MLA.

== Legislature summary ==
Manitoba Legislature
Party	Leader	Candidates	Seats				Popular vote		
Party	Leader	Candidates	2023	Current	Next	+/-	Votes	%	+/-
New Democratic	Wab Kinew	38	34	34					
Progressive Conservative	Konrad Narth (interim)	28	22	19					
Liberal	Willard Reaves	13	1	1					
Keystone	Kevin Friesen	–	–	–	–	–			
Green	Janine Gibson	–	–	–	–	–			
Communist	Cam Scott	–	–	–	–	–			
Independents		3	–	3	–	–			
Vacant				–		–			
Blank and invalid votes									
Total		81	57	57	–				
Registered voters/turnout									

== Candidates ==
† = not seeking re-election
‡ = running for re-election in different constituency
italics indicates contestant for nomination or declared interest
bold indicates party leader

=== Northern Manitoba ===
Electoral district	Candidates					Incumbent
Electoral district	NDP	PC	Liberal	Keystone	Green	Incumbent
Flin Flon	Tom Lindsey					Tom Lindsey
Keewatinook	Ian Bushie					Ian Bushie
Swan River		Rick Wowchuk				Rick Wowchuk
The Pas-Kameesak	Jennifer Flett	Edna Nabess				Jennifer Flett
Thompson	Eric Redhead					Eric Redhead

=== Westman/Parkland ===
Electoral district	Candidates						Incumbent
Electoral district	NDP	PC	Liberal	Keystone	Green	Independent	Incumbent
Agassiz		Jodie Byram					Jodie Byram
Turtle Mountain	Rick Pauls	Mark Custance				Daryl Van Cauwenberghe	Doyle Piwniuk†
Brandon East	Glen Simard	Robert Blake					Glen Simard
Brandon West	Cora Dupuis	Wayne Balcaen					Wayne Balcaen
Dauphin	Ron Kostyshyn	Kayla Gillis					Ron Kostyshyn
Riding Mountain		Greg Nesbitt					Greg Nesbitt
Spruce Woods		Colleen Robbins					Colleen Robbins

=== Central Manitoba ===
Electoral district	Candidates					Incumbent
Electoral district	NDP	PC	Liberal	Keystone	Green	Incumbent
Borderland		Josh Guenter				Josh Guenter
Interlake-Gimli	Sarah Pinsent-Bardarson	Derek Johnson				Derek Johnson
Lakeside		Trevor King				Trevor King
Midland		Lauren Stone				Lauren Stone
Morden-Winkler		Carrie Hiebert				Carrie Hiebert
Springfield-Ritchot		Adam McAllister				Ron Schuler†
Portage la Prairie		Jeff Bereza				Jeff Bereza

=== Eastman ===
Electoral district	Candidates						Incumbent
Electoral district	NDP	PC	Liberal	Keystone	Green	Independent	Incumbent
Dawson Trail		Kyle Waczko				Bob Lagassé	Bob Lagassé
Lac du Bonnet	Rachel Dutton	Wayne Ewasko					Wayne Ewasko
La Verendrye		**Konrad Narth**					Konrad Narth
Steinbach		Michael Zwaagstra					Kelvin Goertzen†
Red River North		Shaun Jeffrey					Jeff Wharton†
Selkirk		Anna Mondor					Richard Perchotte†

=== Northwest Winnipeg ===
Electoral district	Candidates				Incumbent
Electoral district	NDP	PC	Liberal	Independent	Incumbent
Burrows	Diljeet Brar		Garry Alejo		Diljeet Brar
Kildonan-River East	Rachelle Schott				Rachelle Schott
McPhillips	JD Devgan	Serena Klos	Alden Novallasca		JD Devgan
Point Douglas	Bernadette Smith				Bernadette Smith
St. Johns	Nahanni Fontaine		Gerard Madarang	Patrick Allard	Nahanni Fontaine
The Maples	Mintu Sandhu				Mintu Sandhu
Tyndall Park			Cindy Lamoureux		Cindy Lamoureux

=== Northeast Winnipeg ===
Electoral district	Candidates					Incumbent
Electoral district	NDP	PC	Liberal	Green	Communist	Incumbent
Concordia	Matt Wiebe					Matt Wiebe
Elmwood	Jim Maloway					Jim Maloway
Radisson	Jelynn Dela Cruz	James Teitsma				Jelynn Dela Cruz
Rossmere	Tracy Schmidt					Tracy Schmidt
St. Boniface	Robert Loiselle					Robert Loiselle
Transcona	Shannon Corbett		Lorene Mann-Baxter			Shannon Corbett

=== West Winnipeg ===
Electoral district	Candidates				Incumbent
Electoral district	NDP	PC	Liberal	Green	Incumbent
Assiniboia	Nellie Kennedy	Rick Fickes			Nellie Kennedy
Roblin		Kathleen Cook	Darren Christle		Kathleen Cook
Kirkfield Park	Logan Oxenham	Rachel Punzalan	Marlon Guy Watts		Logan Oxenham
St. James	Adrien Sala				Adrien Sala
Tuxedo	Carla Compton	Danial Sprintz			Carla Compton

=== Central Winnipeg ===
Electoral district	Candidates					Incumbent
Electoral district	NDP	PC	Liberal	Green	Independent	Incumbent
Fort Garry			Shandi Strong			Mark Wasyliw
Fort Rouge	Wab Kinew				Jonathan Calderon	**Wab Kinew**
Notre Dame	Malaya Marcelino		Maria Cole Gayle			Malaya Marcelino
River Heights	Mike Moroz		**Willard Reaves**			Mike Moroz
Union Station	Uzoma Asagwara					Uzoma Asagwara
Wolseley	Lisa Naylor					Lisa Naylor

=== South Winnipeg ===
Electoral district	Candidates				Incumbent
Electoral district	NDP	PC	Liberal	Green	Incumbent
Fort Richmond	Jennifer Chen				Jennifer Chen
Fort Whyte			Ian Duncan		Obby Khan
Lagimodière	Tyler Blashko				Tyler Blashko
Riel	Mike Moyes				Mike Moyes
Seine River	Billie Cross	Glen Irvine	Jasbir Singh		Billie Cross
Southdale	Renée Cable				Renée Cable
St. Vital	Jamie Moses		David Hykaway		Jamie Moses
Waverley	David Pankratz				David Pankratz

== Opinion polling ==
Overall Polling with a local regression (LOESS) trend line for each party and a monthly average.

Voting intentions in Manitoba since the 2023 election
Polling firm	Dates conducted	Source	NDP	PC	Liberal	Keystone	Green	Others	Margin of error	Sample size	Polling method	Lead
	September 28–29, 2026	Obby Khan resigns as leader of the Progressive Conservative Party of Manitoba; Konrad Narth becomes interim leader.										
Abacus Data	Aug 28 – Sep 14, 2026		60%	29%	7%	2%	1%	1%	3.1%	1,000	mixed	31%
Probe Research	May 25 – Jun 8, 2026		55%	32%	8%	2%	2%	2%	3.1%	1,000	mixed	23%
Probe Research	Mar 1–17, 2026		55%	35%	6%	1%	2%	1%	3.1%	1,000	mixed	20%
Probe Research	Nov 25 – Dec 10, 2025		53%	32%	9%	2%	4%	0%	3.1%	1,000	mixed	21%
Angus Reid	Nov 26 – Dec 1, 2025		45%	46%	7%	–	1%	1%	5%	315	online	1%
	September 29, 2025	Willard Reaves is elected leader of the Manitoba Liberal Party										
Probe Research	Sep 4–14, 2025		53%	34%	8%	1%	4%	1%	3.1%	1,000	mixed	19%
Angus Reid	Aug 28 – Sep 5, 2025		48%	41%	10%	–	0%	2%	5%	334	online	7%
Probe Research	May 28 – Jun 10, 2025		57%	32%	8%	2%	1%	0%	3.1%	1,000	mixed	25%
Canadian Election Study	Apr 29 – May 13, 2025		47%	36%	15%	–	2%	1%	N/A	419	online	11%
	April 26, 2025	Obby Khan is elected leader of the Manitoba Progressive Conservative Party										
Probe Research	Mar 4–16, 2025		57%	33%	8%	1%	1%	0%	3.1%	1,000	mixed	24%
Probe Research	Nov 26 – Dec 10, 2024		53%	34%	6%	2%	2%	2%	3.1%	1,000	mixed	19%
Probe Research	Sep 5–15, 2024		56%	34%	4%	3%	1%	1%	3.1%	1,000	mixed	22%
Probe Research	May 28 – Jun 9, 2024		51%	38%	6%	1%	1%	1%	3.1%	1,000	mixed	13%
Probe Research	Mar 5–18, 2024		49%	37%	8%	1%	2%	2%	3.1%	1,000	mixed	12%
Probe Research	Nov 22 – Dec 1, 2023		51%	38%	7%	1%	2%	1%	3.1%	1,000	mixed	13%
2023 general election	October 3, 2023	(Note: Official Results)	45.63%	41.86%	10.63%	0.77%	0.74%	0.37%	—	—	—	3.77%
Polling firm	Dates conducted	Source						Others	Margin of error	Sample size	Polling method	Lead
Polling firm	Dates conducted	Source	NDP	PC	Liberal	Keystone	Green	Others	Margin of error	Sample size	Polling method	Lead
