= 43rd Manitoba Legislature =

- Majority parliament
- Nov. 9, 2023 – present

Parliament leaders
- Premier: Wab Kinew; Oct. 18, 2023 – present
- Leader of the Opposition: Heather Stefanson; Oct. 18, 2023 – Jan. 15, 2024
- Wayne Ewasko; Jan. 18, 2024 – Apr. 26, 2025
- Obby Khan; Apr. 26, 2025 – Sep. 28, 2026

Party caucuses
- Government: New Democrat
- Opposition: Progressive Conservative
- Unrecognized: Liberal

Legislative Assembly
- Speaker of the Assembly: Tom Lindsey; Nov. 9, 2023 – present
- Members: 57 MLA seats

Sovereign
- Monarch: Charles III; Sep. 8, 2022 – present
- Lieutenant governor: Hon. Anita Neville; Oct. 24, 2022 – present

Sessions
- 1st session November 9, 2023 – November 18, 2024
- 2nd session November 19, 2024 – November 17, 2025
- 3rd session November 18, 2025 – Present
← 42nd	→ 44th

MPs of the Manitoba Legislature NDP Liberal Party Progressive Conservative Party Independent Vacant

The 43rd Manitoba Legislature was created following a general election in 2023.

== Members of the 43rd Legislative Assembly ==
MLA	Party	Riding	First elected / previously elected	No.# of term(s)	Notes
Jodie Byram	Progressive Conservative	Agassiz	2023	1st term	
**Nellie Kennedy**	New Democratic	Assiniboia	2023	1st term	
Josh Guenter	Progressive Conservative	Borderland	2019	2nd term	
**Glen Simard**	New Democratic	Brandon East	2023	1st term	
Wayne Balcaen	Progressive Conservative	Brandon West	2023	1st term	
Diljeet Brar	New Democratic	Burrows	2019	2nd term	
**Matt Wiebe**	New Democratic	Concordia	2010	5th term	
**Ron Kostyshyn**	New Democratic	Dauphin	2011, 2023	2nd term*	
Bob Lagassé	Progressive Conservative	Dawson Trail	2016	3rd term	Left Caucus March 10, 2026
Bob Lagassé	Independent	Dawson Trail	2016	3rd term	Since March 10, 2026
Jim Maloway	New Democratic	Elmwood	1986, 2011	11th term*	
Tom Lindsey (Note: Speaker of the Assembly.)	New Democratic	Flin Flon	2016	3rd term	
Mark Wasyliw	New Democratic	Fort Garry	2019	2nd term	Removed from caucus September 4, 2024
Mark Wasyliw	Independent	Fort Garry	2019	2nd term	Since September 4, 2024
Jennifer Chen	New Democratic	Fort Richmond	2023	1st term	
**Wab Kinew**	New Democratic	Fort Rouge	2016	3rd term	
Obby Khan	Progressive Conservative	Fort Whyte	2022	2nd term	Removed from caucus September 28, 2026
Obby Khan	Independent	Fort Whyte	2022	2nd term	Since September 28, 2026
Derek Johnson	Progressive Conservative	Interlake-Gimli	2016	3rd term	
**Ian Bushie**	New Democratic	Keewatinook	2019	2nd term	
Rachelle Schott	New Democratic	Kildonan-River East	2023	1st term	
Logan Oxenham	New Democratic	Kirkfield Park	2023	1st term	
Konrad Narth	Progressive Conservative	La Verendrye	2023	1st term	
Wayne Ewasko	Progressive Conservative	Lac du Bonnet	2011	4th term	
Tyler Blashko	New Democratic	Lagimodière	2023	1st term	
Trevor King	Progressive Conservative	Lakeside	2023	1st term	
Jasdeep Devgan	New Democratic	McPhillips	2023	1st term	
Lauren Stone	Progressive Conservative	Midland	2023	1st term	
Carrie Hiebert	Progressive Conservative	Morden-Winkler	2023	1st term	
**Malaya Marcelino**	New Democratic	Notre Dame	2019	2nd term	
**Bernadette Smith**	New Democratic	Point Douglas	2017	3rd term	
Jeff Bereza	Progressive Conservative	Portage la Prairie	2023	1st term	
Jelynn Dela Cruz	New Democratic	Radisson	2023	1st term	
Jeff Wharton	Progressive Conservative	Red River North	2016	3rd term	
Greg Nesbitt	Progressive Conservative	Riding Mountain	2016	3rd term	
**Mike Moyes**	New Democratic	Riel	2023	1st term	
**Mike Moroz**	New Democratic	River Heights	2023	1st term	
Kathleen Cook	Progressive Conservative	Roblin	2023	1st term	
**Tracy Schmidt**	New Democratic	Rossmere	2023	1st term	
Billie Cross	New Democratic	Seine River	2023	1st term	
Richard Perchotte	Progressive Conservative	Selkirk	2023	1st term	
**Renée Cable**	New Democratic	Southdale	2023	1st term	
Ron Schuler	Progressive Conservative	Springfield-Ritchot	1999	7th term	
Grant Jackson	Progressive Conservative	Spruce Woods	2023	1st term	Until March 24, 2025
Colleen Robbins (Since August 26, 2025)	Progressive Conservative	Spruce Woods	2025	1st term	Elected in a by-election on August 26, 2025
Robert Loiselle	New Democratic	St. Boniface	2023	1st term	
**Adrien Sala**	New Democratic	St. James	2019	2nd term	
**Nahanni Fontaine**	New Democratic	St. Johns	2016	3rd term	
**Jamie Moses**	New Democratic	St. Vital	2019	2nd term	
Kelvin Goertzen	Progressive Conservative	Steinbach	2003	6th term	
Rick Wowchuk	Progressive Conservative	Swan River	2016	3rd term	
**Mintu Sandhu**	New Democratic	The Maples	2019	2nd term	
Amanda Lathlin	New Democratic	The Pas-Kameesak	2015	4th term	Died in office March 21, 2026
Jennifer Flett (Since on July 21, 2026)	New Democratic	The Pas-Kameesak	2026	1st term	Elected in a by-election on July 21, 2026
Eric Redhead	New Democratic	Thompson	2022	2nd term	
**Nello Altomare**	New Democratic	Transcona	2019	2nd term	Died in office January 14, 2025
Shannon Corbett (Since March 18, 2025)	New Democratic	Transcona	2025	1st term	Elected in a by-election on March 18, 2025
Doyle Piwniuk	Progressive Conservative	Turtle Mountain	2014	4th term	
Heather Stefanson	Progressive Conservative	Tuxedo	2000	7th term	Resigned May 6, 2024
Carla Compton (Since July 8, 2024)	New Democratic	Tuxedo	2024	1st term	Elected in a by-election on July 8, 2024
Cindy Lamoureux	Liberal	Tyndall Park	2016	3rd term	
**Uzoma Asagwara**	New Democratic	Union Station	2019	2nd term	
David Pankratz	New Democratic	Waverley	2023	1st term	
**Lisa Naylor**	New Democratic	Wolseley	2019	2nd term	

- Members in **bold** are in the Cabinet of Manitoba.
