= Wally Daudrich =

Canadian businessman

Personal details
- Born: 1963 or 1964 (age 62–63) Winnipeg, Manitoba, Canada
- Party: Conservative (federal); Keystone (provincial)
- Other political affiliations: Reform (federal); Progressive Conservative (provincial, until 2026)
- Children: 5

Wally Daudrich is a Canadian businessman and political candidate from Churchill, Manitoba.

== Life and career ==
Daudrich was born in Winnipeg and is married with five children. He lives in both Churchill and Morden, Manitoba.

Daudrich owns Lazy Bear Lodge and Expeditions, an ecotourism business that operates out of Churchill. It has been described as "northern Manitoba’s most successful tourism businesses". As of 2025, Daudrich is in a legal battle over provincial government-issued polar bear tour permits. Some of his tours have received criticism from local Indigenous populations. He is also the president of the Beluga Whale Tourism Association and is one of the directors of the Klein Group, which owns The Winnipeg Sun newspaper.

In politics, Daudrich has ran for the House of Commons as a Conservative and Reform candidate in Churchill, being defeated in the 1993, 2008, and 2011 Canadian federal elections. During the 2011 federal election, Daudrich made headlines for describing U.S. president Barack Obama as the "worst" and "biggest liar." He also describes himself as anti-abortion. While Conservative leader Stephen Harper refused to admonish Daudrich, he did state that he and Obama "have a very good working relationship".

In September 2024, Daudrich announced his intention to run in the 2025 Progressive Conservative Party of Manitoba leadership election to succeed Heather Stefanson, who had led the party to defeat as premier at the 2023 Manitoba general election. During the campaign, he was described as an "outsider" who wanted to "clean up" the party. Daudrich received no endorsements from incumbent party MLAs and received criticism for controversial remarks, including transphobic and Islamophobic posts against Fort Whyte MLA Obby Khan, his opponent in the race, and others. As a political attack, Daudrich claimed that there was "pornography in schools," which was denied by Khan. In February 2025, Daudrich caused controversy after stating that polar bears should be "let loose" to combat homelessness in Manitoba. Khan won the April 2025 leadership election, despite narrowly losing the popular vote to Daudrich. Following the election, he was hit with financial penalties after failing to file campaign paperwork.

In March 2026, he purchased the PC party headquarters in Winnipeg. In June, the PC party prevented Daudrich from seeking the party nomination in Turtle Mountain, which led him to quit the party and join the Keystone Party in July. He also became a board member of the party. Daudrich was the party's candidate in the 2026 The Pas-Kameesak provincial by-election, placing last.

== Electoral history ==
Manitoba provincial by-election, July 21, 2026: The Pas-Kameesak Death of Amanda Lathlin
| Party | Candidate | Votes | % | ±% |
|---|---|---|---|---|
| New Democratic | Jennifer Flett | 2,635 | 74.84 | +7.66 |
| Progressive Conservative | Edna Nabess | 616 | 17.50 | -11.23 |
| Liberal | Dan Quesnel | 165 | 4.69 | +0.59 |
| Keystone | Wally Daudrich | 105 | 2.98 | |
| Total valid votes | | 3,521 | 99.27 | – |
| Total rejected and declined ballots | | 26 | 0.73 | +0.35 |
| Turnout | | 3,547 | 36.28 | -17.24 |
| Eligible voters | | 9,776 | | |
Source: Elections Manitoba
| New Democratic hold | | Swing | | +9.45 |

2025 Progressive Conservative Party of Manitoba leadership election

- Obby Khan 2,198.8
- Wally Daudrich 2,163.2

2011 Canadian federal election: Churchill
| Party | Candidate | Votes | % | ±% | Expenditures |
|---|---|---|---|---|---|
| New Democratic | Niki Ashton | 10,262 | 51.12 | +3.36 | – |
| Conservative | Wally Daudrich | 5,256 | 26.18 | +5.68 | – |
| Liberal | Sydney Garrioch | 4,087 | 20.36 | -8.38 | – |
| Green | Alberteen Spence | 471 | 2.35 | -0.94 | – |
| Total valid votes/expense limit | | 20,076 | 100.00 | | |
| Total rejected ballots | | 107 | 0.53 | -0.02 | |
| Turnout | | 20,183 | 45.35 | +5.20 | |
| Eligible voters | | 44,509 | – | – | |

2008 Canadian federal election: Churchill—Keewatinook Aski
| Party | Candidate | Votes | % | ±% | Expenditures |
|---|---|---|---|---|---|
| New Democratic | Niki Ashton | 8,734 | 47.76 | +19.35 | $79,086 |
| Liberal | Tina Keeper | 5,289 | 28.74 | -11.94 | – |
| Conservative | Wally Daudrich | 3,773 | 20.50 | +8.95 | $45,616 |
| Green | Saara Harvie | 606 | 3.29 | +1.69 | $28 |
| Total valid votes/expense limit | | 18,402 | 100.00 | | $91,452 |
| Total rejected ballots | | 102 | 0.55 | +0.19 | |
| Turnout | | 18,504 | 40.15 | -13.48 | |
| New Democrat gain from Liberal | | Swing | + | | |

1993 Canadian federal election: Churchill
| Party | Candidate | Votes | % | ±% |
|---|---|---|---|---|
| Liberal | Elijah Harper | 9,658 | 40.7 | +17.7 |
| New Democratic | Rod Murphy | 8,751 | 36.9 | -19.5 |
| Progressive Conservative | Don Knight | 2,438 | 10.3 | -10.3 |
| Reform | Wally Daudrich | 2,275 | 9.6 | |
| National | Charles Settee | 590 | 2.5 | – |
| Total valid votes | | 23,712 | 100.0 | |
