= Wasylkiw =

Wasylkiw is a surname. Notable people with the surname include:

- Katelyn Wasylkiw (born 1993), Canadian curler
- Lauren Wasylkiw (born 1990), Canadian curler

== See also ==
- Mark Wasyliw, Canadian politician
