= Jennifer Flett =

Canadian politician

Jennifer Flett MLA

Member of the Legislative Assembly of Manitoba for The Pas-Kameesak
- Incumbent
- Assumed office July 21, 2026
- Preceded by: Amanda Lathlin

Personal details
- Party: New Democratic
- Education: University of Manitoba (BA)

Jennifer Flett is a Canadian politician who represents the electoral district of The Pas-Kameesak in the Legislative Assembly of Manitoba. A member of the New Democratic Party of Manitoba, she was elected in a by-election on July 21, 2026.

She is the former vice-chief of the Opaskwayak Cree Nation, as well as a technician and land commissioner for the Treaty 5 administration office.

== Electoral record ==
Manitoba provincial by-election, July 21, 2026: The Pas-Kameesak Death of Amanda Lathlin
Party	Candidate	Votes	%	±%
New Democratic	Jennifer Flett	2,635	74.84	+7.66
Progressive Conservative	Edna Nabess	616	17.50	-11.23
Liberal	Dan Quesnel	165	4.69	+0.59
Keystone	Wally Daudrich	105	2.98	
Total valid votes		3,521	99.27	–
Total rejected and declined ballots		26	0.73	+0.35
Turnout		3,547	36.28	-17.24
Eligible voters		9,776		
Source: Elections Manitoba
New Democratic hold		Swing		+9.45
