= Keystone Party of Manitoba =

Manitoba, Canada political party

- Leader: Kevin Friesen
- President: David Andres
- Founded: November 2021
- Registered: June 28, 2022
- Split from: Progressive Conservative Party of Manitoba
- Headquarters: P.O. Box 904 Grunthal, Manitoba R0A 0R0
- Ideology: Right-libertarianism; Economic liberalism
- Colours: Purple; yellow
- Seats in Legislature: 0 / 57

Website
- keystonepartymb.ca

The Keystone Party of Manitoba is a provincial political party in Manitoba, Canada.

== History ==
=== Foundation ===
The Keystone Party started organizing in November 2021 after the Progressive Conservative Party of Manitoba leadership election. Farmer Kevin Friesen became the interim leader. The party was officially registered with Elections Manitoba on June 28, 2022.

The party was officially launched on July 15, 2022, at a meeting where it elected Friesen, as its first leader, promoting him from his interim role. It describes itself as a grassroots party that seeks to overcome divides and promote a common Manitoban identity. Described as far-right by multiple media outlets, party leadership insists they are "close to centre" and define their ideology on the protection of civil liberties. A sizable portion of the early grassroots support for Keystone was gained for their staunch opposition to COVID lockdowns which were supported by all major parties.

=== 2023 election ===
The party amassed over 2,500 signatures of voters needed to become a registered party in Manitoba and hoped to field candidates in all 57 Manitoba constituencies during the 43rd Manitoba general election. The party based its campaign on trying to connect with voters dissatisfied with government overreach during the COVID-19 pandemic. The party hoped to garner votes from small-c Conservatives discontent with the longtime leadership of the provincial Conservative party and that party's failure to balance the province's budget during their tenurebeing helped with 10 longtime centrist members of the Conservative party retiring. However, the party had trouble reaching its goal of running 57 candidates in all 57 districts due to the rural, agrarian nature of their platform and voter base which hasn't been received well in more urban parts of the province. Another barrier is the hands off approach the party and its leadership are taking towards constituent associations, insisting on a grassroots approach and only allowing residents of the constituency to form an association, limiting the number of candidates they could run. The party held its convention in the Austin community centre on June 17, 2023, to establish the party's constitution and policies.

The Keystone Party only stood five candidates for the election. Their best showing was in Turtle Mountain where the party's leader, Kevin Friesen, stood, running on a platform of slashing government debt, reducing the cost of living, and repairing the district's roads. Friesen received 1,489 votes or 17.1% of the electorate, coming in third place. The party's second best showing was in La Verendrye where the party's candidate, Matthew Wiebe received 736 votes or 9.8% of the electorate also coming in third place. Wiebe, a political outsider and farmer, stated that he ran because "people don’t trust the PC party to be conservative anymore." The party also stood candidates in Agassiz where they got 721 votes (9.7%), Swan River where they got 394 votes (5.2%), and Interlake-Gimli where they got 391 votes (3.8%). In total the party garnered 3,731 votes. Friesen stated that he was pleased and excited at the support the party got, especially since it was the first election they contested, and the fact that in every riding they contested they did better than the Green Party of Manitoba.

=== 44th Manitoba general election ===
Kevin Friesen stated that the party intends to stand for the 44th Manitoba general election immediately after the 43rd election. He also stated that he will again run in Turtle Mountain and that the main priority for the party was to win over conservatives dissatisfied with the Progressive Conservative Party of Manitoba.

On March 15, 2025, former Manitoba PC leadership candidate Shelly Glover announced that she would be creating her own new centre-right party for PC voters dissatisfied with the rightward turn of the party. Despite overlapping in both purpose and ideology with the Keystone Party, Friesen stated that Glover was not in contact with him. During the 2025 Conservative leadership election the Progressive Conservatives saw a strong rural-urban split within their party, with the rural candidate, Wally Daudrich, losing the race to Obby Khan despite earning the most votes and vowed that he would still stand for a seat in the Legislative Assembly with the Keystone Party publicly inviting him to join the party. He declined, and instead said he would still run as a member of the Progressive Conservatives.

On February 14, 2026, Karl Krebs, one of the leading figures of the Keystone Party who got his political start being the "most public pandemic restriction opponent" in the province during the COVID-19 pandemic and was the party's candidate for Mayor of Winkler, died. On July 1, 2026 Daudrich changed his mind and joined the Keystone Party stating the PCs no longer represent "traditional conservatives" and ran as the party's candidate in the 2026 The Pas-Kameesak provincial by-election after the PCs launched a concerted effort to block his candidacy. Daudrich's leadership opponent Khan welcomed the party switch, stating that Keystone was a "better fit" for Daudrich's views. Daudrich earned just 105 votes in last place.

== Election results ==
General election	Leader	Candidates	Seats	+/-	%	Votes	Position	Parliamentary status
2023	Kevin Friesen	5 / 57	0 / 57	New	0.82%	3,731	4th	Extra-parliamentary

=== By-elections ===
By-election	Date	Candidate	Votes	%	Place
The Pas-Kameesak	July 21, 2026	Wally Daudrich	105	2.98%	4/4
