= 2025 Progressive Conservative Party of Manitoba leadership election =

Manitoba party election for party leader

- April 26, 2025
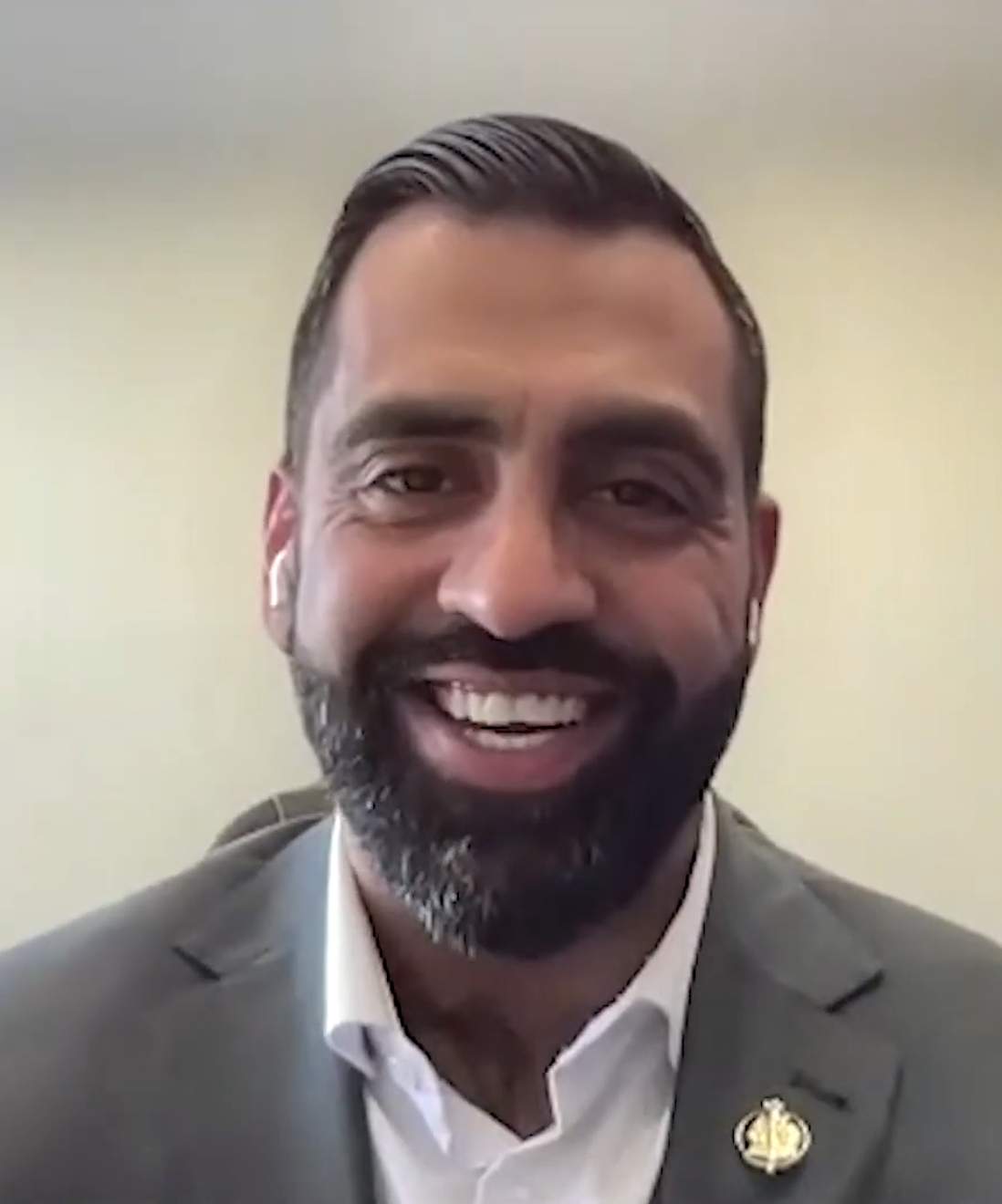
Candidate	Obby Khan	Wally Daudrich
Popular vote	3,334	3,387
Percentage	49.4%	50.2%
Points	2,198.8; 50.4%	2,163.2; 49.6%
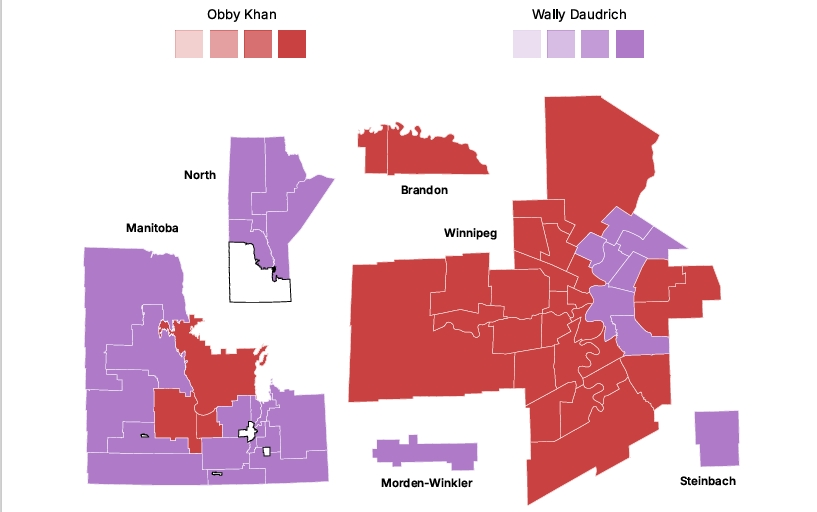
Leader before election
Wayne Ewasko (interim)
Elected Leader
Obby Khan

2025 Progressive Conservative Party of Manitoba leadership election
- Date: April 26, 2025
- Resigning leader: Heather Stefanson
- Won by: Obby Khan
- Ballots: 1
- Candidates: 2
- Entrance fee: $35,000

The 2025 Progressive Conservative Party of Manitoba leadership election was held on April 26, 2025. The internal party election was called as a result of former Premier Heather Stefanson, the leader of the Progressive Conservative Party of Manitoba, announcing her resignation on January 15, 2024 following her loss in the 2023 Manitoba general election. Obby Khan won by points, despite narrowly losing the popular vote.

== Procedure ==
In order to be eligible to contest the election, a candidate had to pay an entry fee of $35,000 and provide a petition for leadership signed by 200 party members. The election was held on a constituency-based weighted one member, one vote system.

== Candidates ==
=== Official ===
As of the registration deadline, the following candidates had committed publicly to running and had completed all requirements in accordance with the rules to be listed as an official candidate:

- Obby Khan (MLA for Fort Whyte; 2021–present, former Minister of Sport, Culture and Heritage; January 30, 2023–October 18, 2023)
  - Endorsements: Kelvin Goertzen (Steinbach), Kathleen Cook (Roblin), Wayne Balcaen (Brandon West), Richard Perchotte (Selkirk), Bob Lagassé (Dawson Trail), Grant Jackson (Spruce Woods), Jeff Bereza (Portage la Prairie), Trevor King (Lakeside), Greg Nesbitt (Riding Mountain) and Ron Schuler (Springfield–Ritchot).
- Wally Daudrich (Ecotourism businessman and hotelier from Churchill, Manitoba and 2008 and 2011 federal Conservative candidate for Churchill)

=== Failed to qualify ===
- Trevor Sprague (accountant with MNP and Winnipeg North—St. Paul candidate for the Canadian Alliance in the 2000 federal election)

=== Declined ===
- Wayne Balcaen (MLA for Brandon West 2023–present, former Police Chief of the Brandon Police Service)
- Candice Bergen (former Conservative MP for Portage—Lisgar; 2008–2023 and interim leader of the Conservative Party of Canada in 2022)
- Brian Bowman (former Mayor of Winnipeg)
- Kathleen Cook (MLA for Roblin; 2023–present)
- Carla Devlin (Mayor of East St. Paul; 2022–2026)
- Wayne Ewasko (MLA for Lac du Bonnet; 2011–present, interim leader 2024–2025)
- Scott Gillingham (Mayor of Winnipeg; 2022–present)
- Kelvin Goertzen (MLA for Steinbach; 2003–present, former Premier of Manitoba; 2021)
- Kevin Klein (former MLA for Kirkfield Park; 2022–2023)
- Shannon Martin (former MLA for McPhillips; 2016–2023)
- Richard Perchotte (MLA for Selkirk; 2023–present)
- Ron Schuler (2006 Progressive Conservative Leadership candidate and MLA for Springfield-Ritchot; 1999–present)
- Rick Wowchuk (MLA for Swan River; 2016–present)
