= 2026 The Pas-Kameesak provincial by-election =

Manitoba, Canada provincial byelection

- July 21, 2026

Riding of The Pas-Kameesak
- Turnout: 36.28% (▼17.24)
	First party	Second party
	NDP	PCP
Candidate	Jennifer Flett	Edna Nabess
Party	New Democratic	Progressive Conservative
Last election	67.18%	28.72%
Popular vote	2,635	616
Percentage	74.84%	17.50%
Swing	▲7.66%	▼11.23
MLA before election
Amanda Lathlin
New Democratic
Elected MLA
Jennifer Flett
New Democratic

The 2026 The Pas-Kameesak provincial by-election was held in the electoral district of The-Pas Kameesak on July 21, 2026. The seat was represented by Amanda Lathlin of the New Democratic Party of Manitoba (NDP) from April 2015 until her death in March 2026.

== Candidates ==
New Democratic Party

The NDP nominated Jennifer Flett, a technician and land commissioner for the Treaty 5 administration office, on June 22, 2026; Flett was also previously a member of the Opaskwayak Cree Nation's council.

Progressive Conservative Party

The Tories nominated entrepreneur Edna Nabess on June 30, 2026. Nabess is of the Mathias Colomb Cree Nation and previously served on several public boards. Nabess was previously the PCP candidate in several past elections, including in The Pas in the 2009 by-election, in Keewatinook in the 2016 Manitoba general election, and in Fort Rouge in the 2019 Manitoba general election against Wab Kinew.

Liberal Party

The Liberals nominated businessman and bank manager Dan Quesnel on June 26, 2026. Quesnel was formerly the president of The Pas/Opaskwayak Cree Nation Chamber of Commerce.

Keystone Party

The Keystone Party nominated hotelier and ecotourism operator Wally Daudrich on July 1, 2026. Daudrich was formerly a member of the Progressive Conservative Party but switched parties to run in this by-election. Daudrich was previously the Reform Party candidate in Churchill during the 1993 Canadian federal election, and the Conservative candidate in Churchill in both the 2008 and 2011 Canadian federal elections; additionally, Daudrich was a candidate in the 2025 Manitoba PC leadership election.

== Result ==
Manitoba provincial by-election, July 21, 2026: The Pas-Kameesak Death of Amanda Lathlin
Party	Candidate	Votes	%	±%
New Democratic	Jennifer Flett	2,635	74.84	+7.66
Progressive Conservative	Edna Nabess	616	17.50	-11.23
Liberal	Dan Quesnel	165	4.69	+0.59
Keystone	Wally Daudrich	105	2.98	
Total valid votes		3,521	99.27	–
Total rejected and declined ballots		26	0.73	+0.35
Turnout		3,547	36.28	-17.24
Eligible voters		9,776		
Source: Elections Manitoba
New Democratic hold		Swing		+9.45

== Previous result ==
2023 Manitoba general election: The Pas-Kameesak
Party	Candidate	Votes	%	±%	Expenditures
New Democratic	Amanda Lathlin	3,522	67.18	+9.27	$13,310.33
Progressive Conservative	Alan McLauchlan	1,506	28.72	+4.40	$25,109.47
Liberal	Alvina Rundle	215	4.10	+0.71	$4,535.93
Total valid votes/expense limit		5,243	99.62	–	$38,388.00
Total rejected and declined ballots		20	0.38	–0.11	
Turnout		5,263	53.52	+10.48	
Eligible voters		9,834			
New Democratic hold		Swing		+2.44	
Source(s) Source: Elections Manitoba
