= Jodie Byram =

Canadian politician

Jodie Byram MLA

Member of the Legislative Assembly of Manitoba for Agassiz
- Incumbent
- Assumed office October 3, 2023
- Preceded by: Eileen Clarke

Personal details
- Born: Manitoba, Canada
- Party: Progressive Conservative

Jodie Byram is a Canadian politician, who was elected to the Legislative Assembly of Manitoba in the 2023 Manitoba general election. She represents the district of Agassiz as a member of the Manitoba Progressive Conservative Party.

Prior to being elected, she was the constituency assistant for Eileen Clarke.

On October 24, 2023, she was appointed as the Shadow Minister for Labour and Immigration and as the Shadow Minister for The Workers Compensation Board. In 2025, she was appointed as the Shadow Minister for Families, Accessibility, and Gender Equality.

She has advocated for several issues brought forward by the disability community including spearheading Progressive Conservative support for the Integrated Adult Services report that would transform the disability support system in Manitoba. Jodie has also advocated for a CT Scanner in the new hospital in Neepawa, which was funded by the Progressive Conservative government.

== Electoral record ==
2023 Manitoba general election: Agassiz
Party	Candidate	Votes	%	±%	Expenditures
Progressive Conservative	Jodie Byram	4,519	63.85	-11.67	$15,784.10
New Democratic	Danica Wiggins	1,553	21.94	+9.17	$168.00
Keystone	Mark Wilson	694	9.81	–	$2,420.84
Liberal	Richard Davies	311	4.39	-1.74	$0.00
Total valid votes/expense limit		7,077	99.24	–	$52,088.00
Total rejected and declined ballots		54	0.76	–	
Turnout		7,131	53.35	-2.70	
Eligible voters		13,366			
Progressive Conservative hold		Swing		-10.42	
Source(s) Source: Elections Manitoba
