= The Pas-Kameesak =

Provincial electoral district in Manitoba, Canada

Manitoba electoral district

Provincial electoral district
- Legislature: Legislative Assembly of Manitoba
MLA
Jennifer Flett
New Democratic
- District created: 2018
- First contested: 2019
- Last contested: 2023

Demographics
- Population (2021): 21,150
- Electors (2023): 12,823
- Area (km²): 60,976
- Pop. density (per km²): 0.35
- Census division(s): Division No. 18, Division No. 19, Division No. 21
- Census subdivision(s): Chemawawin 2 & 3, Dauphin River 48A, Fairford 50, Fisher, Fisher River 44, Grahamdale, Grand Rapids, Grand Rapids 33, Jackhead 43, Kelsey, Little Saskatchewan 48, Moose Lake 31A, Opaskwayak Cree Nation 21, Peguis 1B, The Narrows 49, The Pas

The Pas-Kameesak (French: Le Pas-Kameesak) is a provincial electoral district in Northern Manitoba, Canada.

The riding was created by the 2018 provincial redistribution after the former riding of The Pas gained significant portions of the Swan River and the former riding of Interlake. It came into effect at the 2019 Manitoba general election.

The riding includes the town of The Pas, as well as Opaskwayak Cree Nation, Grand Rapids, Easterville, Pinaymootang First Nation, Peguis First Nation, Lake St. Martin First Nation, and Little Saskatchewan First Nation.

The riding is named for the town of The Pas, the largest community in the riding, and the Cree word kameesak, meaning 'big', a reference to Lake Winnipeg.

== Members of the Legislative Assembly ==
Assembly	Years	Member	Party
Riding created from The Pas, Swan River and Interlake
42nd	2019–2023	Amanda Lathlin	New Democratic
43rd	2023–2026	Amanda Lathlin	New Democratic
43rd	2026–present	Jennifer Flett	New Democratic

== Election results ==
=== 2026 ===
Manitoba provincial by-election, July 21, 2026 Death of Amanda Lathlin
Party	Candidate	Votes	%	±%
New Democratic	Jennifer Flett	2,635	74.84	+7.66
Progressive Conservative	Edna Nabess	616	17.50	-11.23
Liberal	Dan Quesnel	165	4.69	+0.59
Keystone	Wally Daudrich	105	2.98	
Total valid votes		3,521	99.27	–
Total rejected and declined ballots		26	0.73	+0.35
Turnout		3,547	36.28	-17.24
Eligible voters		9.776		
Source: Elections Manitoba
New Democratic hold		Swing		+9.45

=== 2023 ===
2023 Manitoba general election
Party	Candidate	Votes	%	±%	Expenditures
New Democratic	Amanda Lathlin	3,522	67.18	+9.27	$13,310.33
Progressive Conservative	Alan McLauchlan	1,506	28.72	+4.40	$25,109.47
Liberal	Alvina Rundle	215	4.10	+0.71	$4,535.93
Total valid votes/expense limit		5,243	99.62	–	$38,388.00
Total rejected and declined ballots		20	0.38	–0.11	
Turnout		5,263	53.52	+10.48	
Eligible voters		9,834			
New Democratic hold		Swing		+2.44	
Source(s) Source: Elections Manitoba

=== 2019 ===
2019 Manitoba general election
Party	Candidate	Votes	%	±%	Expenditures
New Democratic	Amanda Lathlin	3,180	57.90	+19.1	$9,983.35
Progressive Conservative	Ron Evans	1,336	24.33	-14.2	none listed
Green	Ralph McLean	790	14.38	+11.1	$1,993.53
Liberal	Ken Brandt	186	3.39	-15.9	$0.00
Total valid votes		5,492	99.51		
Rejected		27	0.49		
Turnout		5,519	43.04		
Eligible voters		12,823			
New Democratic hold		Swing		+16.6	
Source(s) Source: Manitoba. Chief Electoral Officer (2019). Statement of Votes for the 42nd Provincial General Election, September 10, 2019 (PDF) (Report). Winnipeg: Elections Manitoba.

2016 provincial election redistributed results
Party	%
New Democratic	38.8
Progressive Conservative	38.5
Liberal	19.3
Green	3.3

== Subdivisions ==
The Pas-Kameesak includes the following communities/subdivisions:

- Chemawawin 2 & 3
- Dauphin River First Nation
- Division 18, Unorganized
- Division 19, Unorganized
- Division No. 21, Unorganized
- Fisher
- Fisher River Cree Nation
- Grahamdale
- Grand Rapids
- Kelsey
- Kinonjeoshtegon First Nation
- Lake St. Martin First Nation
- Little Saskatchewan First Nation
- Misipawistik Cree Nation
- Moose Lake 31A
- Opaskwayak Cree Nation
- Peguis First Nation
- Pinaymootang First Nation
- The Pas

== See also ==
- List of Manitoba provincial electoral districts
- Canadian provincial electoral districts
