= Jeff Bereza =

Canadian politician

Jeff Bereza MLA

Member of the Legislative Assembly of Manitoba for Portage la Prairie
- Incumbent
- Assumed office October 3, 2023
- Preceded by: Ian Wishart

Deputy Leader of the Progressive Conservative Party of Manitoba
- Incumbent
- Assumed office May 6, 2025
- Leader: Obby Khan; Konrad Narth (interim)
- Preceded by: Kathleen Cook; Kelvin Goertzen

City Councillor Portage La Prairie
- In office 2006–2010

Personal details
- Born: August 6, 1963 (age 63)
- Party: Progressive Conservative
- Spouse: Lynne Bereza
- Children: 2

Jeff Bereza is a Canadian politician, who was elected to the Legislative Assembly of Manitoba in the 2023 Manitoba general election. He represents the district of Portage la Prairie as a member of the Manitoba Progressive Conservative Party.

Bereza was previously a councillor for Portage la Prairie, being first elected in 2006 with 2,351 votes, the most votes of any candidate in the race. In 2010, he unsuccessfully sought election for mayor, losing to incumbent Earl Porter with 2,157 votes to 1,678.

On October 24, 2023, he was appointed as the Shadow Minister for Agriculture.

On May 6, 2025, he was appointed the Deputy Leader of the Progressive Conservative Party.

== Electoral record ==
2023 Manitoba general election: Portage la Prairie
Party	Candidate	Votes	%	±%	Expenditures
Progressive Conservative	Jeff Bereza	3,816	59.61	-6.07	$13,665.32
New Democratic	Acacia Weselake	1,918	29.96	+7.96	$168.00
Green	Arishya Aggarwal	367	5.73	–	$1,117.39
Liberal	Ralph Dooley	301	4.70	-7.63	$0.00
Total valid votes/expense limit		6,402	99.13	–	$54,279.00
Total rejected and declined ballots		56	0.87	–	
Turnout		6,458	46.77	-1.87	
Eligible voters		13,809			
Progressive Conservative hold		Swing		-7.01	
Source(s) Source: Elections Manitoba
