= Nellie Kennedy =

Canadian politician

The Honourable Nellie Kennedy MLA

Minister of Sport, Culture, Heritage and Tourism
- Incumbent
- Assumed office November 13, 2024
- Premier: Wab Kinew
- Preceded by: Glen Simard

Member of the Legislative Assembly of Manitoba for Assiniboia
- Incumbent
- Assumed office October 3, 2023
- Preceded by: Scott Johnston

Personal details
- Party: New Democratic
- Education: University of Winnipeg University of Manitoba

Nellie Kennedy is a Canadian politician, who was elected to the Legislative Assembly of Manitoba in the 2023 Manitoba general election. She represents the district of Assiniboia as a member of the Manitoba New Democratic Party.

Prior to being elected, she was a community services disability worker.

== Electoral history ==
2023 Manitoba general election: Assiniboia
Party	Candidate	Votes	%	±%	Expenditures
New Democratic	Nellie Kennedy	4,722	50.02	+14.55	$22,718.51
Progressive Conservative	Scott Johnston	3,806	40.31	-3.94	$47,635.37
Liberal	Charles Ward	913	9.67	-3.76	$14,259.80
Total valid votes/expense limit		9,441	99.55	–	$66,377.00
Total rejected and declined ballots		43	0.45	–	
Turnout		9,484	55.70	+1.00	
Eligible voters		17,028			
New Democratic gain from Progressive Conservative		Swing		+9.25	
Source(s) Source: Elections Manitoba
