= Kathleen Cook =

Canadian politician

Kathleen Cook MLA

Member of the Legislative Assembly of Manitoba for Roblin
- Incumbent
- Assumed office October 3, 2023
- Preceded by: Myrna Driedger

Deputy Leader of the Progressive Conservative Party of Manitoba for Winnipeg and urban centres
- In office January 29, 2024 – May 6, 2025 Serving with Kelvin Goertzen (Deputy Leader for rural Manitoba)
- Leader: Wayne Ewasko; Obby Khan
- Succeeded by: Jeff Bereza

Personal details
- Born: 1981–1996 (age 29–45)
- Party: Progressive Conservative
- Spouse: Jared Cook
- Children: 4
- Education: University of Winnipeg (BA)

Kathleen Cook (born between 1981 and 1996) is a Canadian politician, who was elected to the Legislative Assembly of Manitoba in the 2023 Manitoba general election. She represents the district of Roblin as a member of the Manitoba Progressive Conservative Party.

On October 24, 2023, she was appointed as the Shadow Minister for Health. From 2024 to 2025, she served as the Deputy Leader of the Opposition Progressive Conservatives for Winnipeg and urban centres. She was replaced as Deputy Leader in May 2025 by Jeff Bereza, and became the Party Whip.

Cook was provincial director for the Canadian Federation of Independent Business.

Cook has a political science degree from the University of Winnipeg.

== Electoral record ==
2023 Manitoba general election: Roblin
| Party | Candidate | Votes | % | ±% | Expenditures |
|---|---|---|---|---|---|
| Progressive Conservative | Kathleen Cook | 6,088 | 49.72 | -5.47 | $18,280.04 |
| New Democratic | Madelaine Dwyer | 4,968 | 40.57 | +22.57 | $2,103.86 |
| Liberal | Detlev Regelsky | 1,189 | 9.71 | -6.08 | $0.00 |
| Total valid votes/expense limit | | 12,245 | 99.39 | – | $76,775.00 |
| Total rejected and declined ballots | | 75 | 0.61 | – | |
| Turnout | | 12,320 | 62.54 | +0.71 | |
| Eligible voters | | 19,699 | | | |
| Progressive Conservative hold | | Swing | | -14.02 | |
Source(s) Source: Elections Manitoba
