= Red River North =

Provincial electoral district in Manitoba, Canada

Manitoba electoral district

Provincial electoral district
- Legislature: Legislative Assembly of Manitoba
MLA
Jeff Wharton
Progressive Conservative
- District created: 2018
- First contested: 2019
- Last contested: 2023

Demographics
- Population (2016): 21,000
- Electors (2019): 15,077
- Area (km²): 922
- Pop. density (per km²): 22.8
- Census division(s): Division No. 12, Division No. 13, Division No. 19
- Census subdivision(s): Brokenhead 4, Division No. 19, Unorganized, Springfield, St. Clements, East St. Paul

Red River North (French: Rivière-Rouge-Nord) is a provincial electoral district of Manitoba, Canada, that came into effect for the 2019 Manitoba general election.

The riding was created by the 2018 provincial redistribution out of parts of Selkirk, St. Paul, and a small part of Lac du Bonnet.

== Election results ==
=== 2023 ===
2023 Manitoba general election
Party	Candidate	Votes	%	±%	Expenditures
Progressive Conservative	Jeff Wharton	5,926	60.35	+2.38	$24,507.31
New Democratic	Alicia Hill	3,893	39.65	+14.78	$168.00
Total valid votes/expense limit		9,819	98.56	–	$64,198.00
Total rejected and declined ballots		143	1.44	–	
Turnout		9,962	60.47	-3.49	
Eligible voters		16,474			
Progressive Conservative hold		Swing		-6.20	
Source(s) Source: Elections Manitoba

=== 2019 ===
2019 Manitoba general election
Party	Candidate	Votes	%	±%	Expenditures
Progressive Conservative	Jeff Wharton	5,569	57.97	-8.2	$24,853.38
New Democratic	Chris Pullen	2,389	24.87	+3.2	$4,288.04
Green	Graham Hnatiuk	740	7.70	–	$275.00
Liberal	Noel Ngo	735	7.65	-4.5	$0.00
Manitoba First	Jocelyn Burzuik	173	1.80	–	$1,716.07
Total valid votes		9,606	–		
Rejected		38	–		
Eligible voters / turnout		15,077	63.96		
Progressive Conservative hold		Swing		-5.7	
Source(s) Source: Manitoba. Chief Electoral Officer (2019). Statement of Votes for the 42nd Provincial General Election, September 10, 2019 (PDF) (Report). Winnipeg: Elections Manitoba. "Candidate Election Returns". Elections Manitoba. Elections Manitoba.

2016 provincial election redistributed results
Party	%
Progressive Conservative	66.2
New Democratic	21.7
Liberal	12.1

== See also ==
- List of Manitoba provincial electoral districts
- Canadian provincial electoral districts
