= Glen Simard =

Canadian politician

The Honourable Glen Simard MLA

Minister of Municipal and Northern Relations
- Incumbent
- Assumed office November 13, 2024
- Premier: Wab Kinew
- Preceded by: Ian Bushie

Minister of Sport, Culture, Heritage and Tourism
- In office October 18, 2023 – November 13, 2024
- Premier: Wab Kinew
- Preceded by: Obby Khan
- Succeeded by: Nellie Kennedy

Member of the Legislative Assembly of Manitoba for Brandon East
- Incumbent
- Assumed office October 3, 2023
- Preceded by: Len Isleifson

Personal details
- Born: May 2, 1975 (age 51) Russell, Manitoba, Canada
- Party: New Democratic
- Education: Brandon University (BEd, BA)

Glen Simard is a Canadian politician, who was elected to the Legislative Assembly of Manitoba in the 2023 Manitoba general election. He represents the district of Brandon East as a member of the Manitoba New Democratic Party.

Prior to being elected, Simard was a teacher at École Harrison.

== Electoral history ==
2023 Manitoba general election: Brandon East
| Party | Candidate | Votes | % | ±% | Expenditures |
|---|---|---|---|---|---|
| New Democratic | Glen Simard | 3,758 | 55.64 | +19.30 | $26,633.93 |
| Progressive Conservative | Len Isleifson | 2,691 | 39.84 | -11.16 | $35,834.84 |
| Liberal | Trenton Zazalak | 305 | 4.52 | -8.15 | $0.00 |
| Total valid votes/expense limit | | 6,754 | 99.48 | – | $59,632.00 |
| Total rejected and declined ballots | | 35 | 0.52 | – | |
| Turnout | | 6,789 | 46.99 | +1.30 | |
| Eligible voters | | 14,449 | | | |
| New Democratic gain from Progressive Conservative | | Swing | | +15.23 | |
Source(s) Source: Elections Manitoba
