= Robert Loiselle =

Canadian politician

Robert Loiselle MLA

Member of the Legislative Assembly of Manitoba for St. Boniface
- Incumbent
- Assumed office October 3, 2023
- Preceded by: Dougald Lamont

Personal details
- Party: New Democratic
- Spouse: Katherine Loiselle
- Children: 2
- Education: Université de Saint-Boniface; Red River College Polytechnic; University of Manitoba

Robert Loiselle is a Canadian politician, who was elected to the Legislative Assembly of Manitoba in the 2023 Manitoba general election. He represents the district of St. Boniface as a member of the Manitoba New Democratic Party.

Prior to being elected, Loiselle was a teacher. He grew up in North Saint-Boniface. He is Métis and Francophone.

== Electoral history ==
2023 Manitoba general election: St. Boniface
Party	Candidate	Votes	%	±%	Expenditures
New Democratic	Robert Loiselle	5,585	53.38	+23.51	$26,407.59
Liberal	Dougald Lamont	3,413	32.62	-9.06	$14,316.61
Progressive Conservative	Kiratveer Hayer	1,391	13.30	-5.85	$0.00
Communist	Damon Bath	73	0.70	–	$106.40
Total valid votes/expense limit		10,462	99.42	–	$69,418.00
Total rejected and declined ballots		61	0.58	–	
Turnout		10,523	60.06	+0.28	
Eligible voters		17,521			
New Democratic gain from Liberal		Swing		+16.29	
Source(s) Source: Elections Manitoba
