= Wayne Balcaen =

Canadian politician

Wayne Balcaen MLA

Member of the Legislative Assembly of Manitoba for Brandon West
- Incumbent
- Assumed office October 3, 2023
- Preceded by: Reg Helwer

Personal details
- Born: Winnipeg, Manitoba Canada
- Party: Progressive Conservative
- Education: Lethbridge Community College

Wayne Balcaen is a Canadian politician, who was elected to the Legislative Assembly of Manitoba in the 2023 Manitoba general election. He represents the district of Brandon West as a member of the Manitoba Progressive Conservative Party.

After living in Soest, Germany where his father was stationed, Balcaen moved with his family to Brandon, Manitoba at the age of 5. He attended Lethbridge Community College where he earned a diploma in Law Enforcement in 1990. After graduating, he served in the Brandon Police Service, becoming the chief of police in 2017.

On October 24, 2023, he was appointed as the Shadow Minister for Justice.

== Electoral record ==
2023 Manitoba general election: Brandon West
Party	Candidate	Votes	%	±%	Expenditures
Progressive Conservative	Wayne Balcaen	3,814	48.75	-9.64	$34,464.23
New Democratic	Quentin Robinson	3,725	47.62	+23.82	$6,200.25
Green	Bill Marsh	284	3.63	-6.50	$0.00
Total valid votes/expense limit		7,823	99.38	–	$60,088.00
Total rejected and declined ballots		49	0.62	–	
Turnout		7,872	51.68	+0.41	
Eligible voters		15,232			
Progressive Conservative hold		Swing		-16.73	
Source(s) Source: Elections Manitoba
