= Mark Wasyliw =

Canadian politician

Mark Wasyliw MLA

Member of the Legislative Assembly of Manitoba for Fort Garry
- Incumbent
- Assumed office September 10, 2019
- Preceded by: Riding re-established James Allum (2019)

Personal details
- Party: Independent (2024-present)
- Other political affiliations: New Democratic (until 2024)
- Education: University of Manitoba (BA); McGill University (MA); University of Ottawa (LLB); Osgoode Hall Law School (LLM)
- Profession: Politician; lawyer

Mark Wasyliw is a Canadian politician who was elected to the Legislative Assembly of Manitoba in the 2019 Manitoba general election. He represents the electoral district of Fort Garry.

After having been elected as a member of the New Democratic Party of Manitoba, on September 16, 2024, Wasyliw was removed from the NDP's provincial caucus following revelations that his legal partner was a defence lawyer for former Winnipeg-based businessman and convicted sex offender Peter Nygård. The party criticized his judgment. Wasyliw criticized Premier Wab Kinew as a "toxic and dysfunctional" leader and a "bully" in response, and said he would continue to serve as an independent MLA. It was announced in January 2026 that Wasyliw had filed a defamation lawsuit on December 23, 2025 against three NDP MLAs—Kinew, Billie Cross and cabinet minister Ian Bushie—over the claims he was associated with Nygård.

== Electoral history ==
2023 Manitoba general election: Fort Garry
Party	Candidate	Votes	%	±%	Expenditures
New Democratic	Mark Wasyliw	5,319	58.82	+16.47	$26,232.97
Progressive Conservative	Rick Shone	2,405	26.60	-5.22	$7,032.45
Liberal	Shandi Strong	1,082	11.97	-6.22	$11,604.00
Green	Aaron Kowal	237	2.62	-5.03	$749.43
Total valid votes/expense limit		9,043	99.46	–	$60,307.00
Total rejected and declined ballots		49	0.54	–	
Turnout		9,092	58.75	-2.94	
Eligible voters		15,476			
New Democratic hold		Swing		+10.84	
Source(s) Source: Elections Manitoba

2019 Manitoba general election: Fort Garry
Party	Candidate	Votes	%	±%	Expenditures
New Democratic	Mark Wasyliw	4,003	42.35	+6.5	$23,569.90
Progressive Conservative	Nancy Cooke	3,007	31.81	-5.9	$29,491.08
Liberal	Craig Larkins	1,719	18.19	+4.7	$5,839.65
Green	Casey Fennessy	723	7.65	-4.8	$15.08
Total valid votes		9,452	–	–	
Rejected		47	–		
Eligible voters / turnout		15,399	61.69	-4.37	
New Democratic notional gain from Progressive Conservative		Swing		+6.2	
Source(s) Source: Manitoba. Chief Electoral Officer (2019). Statement of Votes for the 42nd Provincial General Election, September 10, 2019 (PDF) (Report). Winnipeg: Elections Manitoba. "Candidate Election Returns". Elections Manitoba. Elections Manitoba.

2006 Canadian federal election: Winnipeg South Centre
Party	Candidate	Votes	%	±%	Expenditures
Liberal	Anita Neville	16,296	39.25	−7.35	$71,377
Conservative	Michael Richards	13,077	31.49	+4.47	$72,385
New Democratic	Mark Wasyliw	9,055	21.81	+0.56	$19,492
Green	Vere H. Scott	1,848	4.45	+0.58	$1,237
Progressive Canadian	Dale Swirsky	934	2.25	–	$11,137
Independent	Jeffrey Anderson	246	0.59	–	$3,204
Canadian Action	Magnus Thompson	66	0.16	−0.13	$2,750
Total valid votes		41,522	99.64		–
Total rejected ballots		150	0.36	+0.00	
Turnout		41,672	69.49	+6.85	
Eligible voters		59,971	–	–	
Liberal hold		Swing		-5.91	
