= 2023 Manitoba general election =

Provincial election

- October 3, 2023

57 seats of the Legislative Assembly of Manitoba 29 seats are needed for a majority
- Turnout: 55.29% ▲
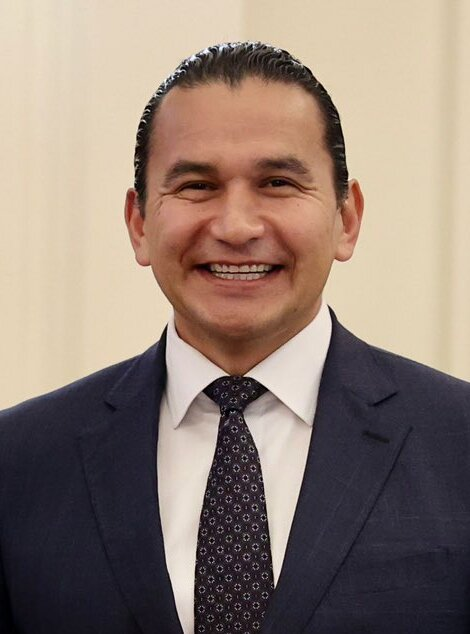

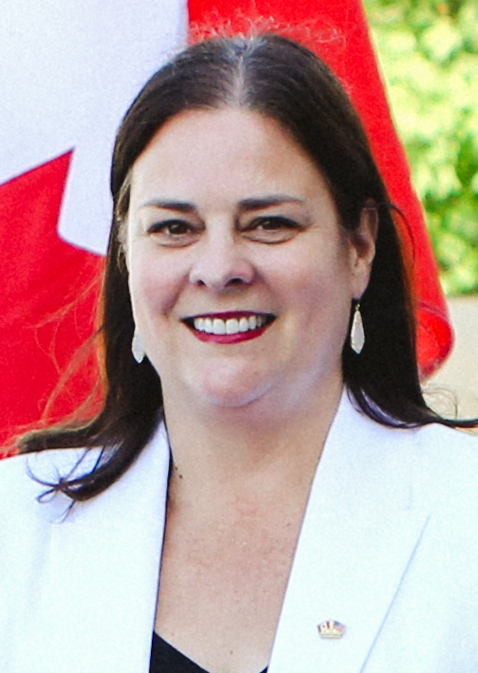

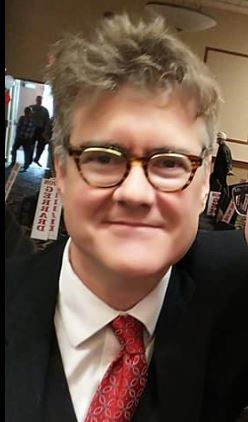
	First party	Second party	Third party
Leader	Wab Kinew	Heather Stefanson	Dougald Lamont
Party	New Democratic	Progressive Conservative	Liberal
Leader since	September 16, 2017	October 30, 2021	October 21, 2017
Leader's seat	Fort Rouge	Tuxedo	St. Boniface (lost re-election)
Last election	18 seats, 31.38%	36 seats, 47.07%	3 seats, 14.48%
Seats before	18	35	3
Seats won	34	22	1
Seat change	▲16	▼13	▼2
Popular vote	221,695	203,350	51,634
Percentage	45.63%	41.86%	10.63%
Swing	▲14.25pp	▼5.21pp	▼3.85pp
- Popular vote by riding. As this is an FPTP election, seat totals are not determined by popular vote, but instead via results by each riding. Riding names are listed on the bottom.
Premier before election
Heather Stefanson
Progressive Conservative
Premier after election
Wab Kinew
New Democratic

The 2023 Manitoba general election was held on October 3, 2023, to elect 57 members to the Legislative Assembly of Manitoba. The New Democratic Party of Manitoba, led by Wab Kinew, formed a majority government, defeating the two-term Progressive Conservative government. Following the election, Kinew became the second Indigenous premier of Manitoba and the first First Nations person to become premier of a Canadian province.

The incumbent Progressive Conservative Party of Manitoba, led by Premier Heather Stefanson, had attempted to win a third term in government, having previously won the 2016 and 2019 elections under the leadership of Brian Pallister.

== Background ==
Under Manitoba's Elections Act, a general election must be held no later than the first Tuesday of October in the fourth calendar year following the previous election. As the previous election was held in 2019, the latest possible date for the election was October 3, 2023, which was the official election date. The election was held under first-past-the-post voting.

On August 10, 2021, incumbent premier Brian Pallister announced that he would not seek re-election and resigned shortly after. Members of the Progressive Conservative Party of Manitoba elected Heather Stefanson to succeed Premier Kelvin Goertzen, who served as interim leader of the party after Pallister's departure. During the previous legislature, the opposition NDP had gained a polling lead over the PCs. However, the lead tightened during the campaign period.

== Campaign ==
Stefanson primarily campaigned on reducing the cost of living for Manitobans, crime, and parental rights in education. Kinew led the NDP into the election. The NDP campaign focused on healthcare reform and balancing the province's budget. Dougald Lamont led the Liberals and Janine Gibson led the Green Party, having been elected leader in March.

The PCs promoted the film industry in the province and in 2022 helped WestJet launch direct flights from Los Angeles to Winnipeg. The New Democrats focused on healthcare with a promise to improve cardiac services. They also pledged to install geothermal systems in thousands of homes. The Liberals campaigned on creating more benefits for seniors, including establishing a minimum income for people over 60. They also promised a new debt relief system if elected. The Manitoba Chambers of Commerce encouraged voters to prioritise the economy when voting.

During the final stages of the campaign, a point of contention was the proposed search of a Winnipeg landfill for the remains of the murdered Indigenous women Morgan Harris and Marcedes Myran. The PCs opposed the search, citing health and safety concerns. The Liberals and NDP supported a search. Most other Indigenous issues were reportedly side-lined during the campaign.

Other campaign issues included crime, agriculture and affordable housing.

Manitoba had not elected a minority government since 1988, so the media coverage was focused on the PCs and the NDP. In the final days of the campaign, the Manitoba government reported a surplus in the provincial budget worth $270 million.

=== Incumbents not standing for re-election ===
Electoral district	Incumbent at dissolution and subsequent party nominee		New MLA
Agassiz	Eileen Clarke	Jodie Byram	Jodie Byram
Brandon West	Reg Helwer	Wayne Balcaen	Wayne Balcaen
Fort Richmond	Sarah Guillemard	Paramjit Shahi	Jennifer Chen
Kildonan-River East	Cathy Cox	Alana Vannahme	Rachelle Schott
Lakeside	Ralph Eichler	Trevor King	Trevor King
La Verendrye	Dennis Smook	Konrad Narth	Konrad Narth
McPhillips	Shannon Martin	Sheilah Restall	Jasdeep Devgan
Midland	Blaine Pedersen	Lauren Stone	Lauren Stone
Portage la Prairie	Ian Wishart	Jeff Bereza	Jeff Bereza
Roblin	Myrna Driedger	Kathleen Cook	Kathleen Cook
Spruce Woods	Cliff Cullen	Grant Jackson	Grant Jackson
Selkirk	Alan Lagimodiere	Richard Perchotte	Richard Perchotte

=== Candidates ===
The PCs and New Democrats ran candidates in all 57 ridings, while the Liberals ran candidates in 49 and the Greens in 13, respectively.

Riding contests, by number of candidates (2023)
Candidates	NDP	PC	Lib	Grn	KP	Comm	Ind	Total
2	4	4						8
3	34	34	30	3	1			102
4	16	16	16	7	4	2	3	64
5	3	3	3	3		3		15
Total	57	57	49	13	5	5	3	189

== Timeline ==
=== 2021 ===
- July 15: Eileen Clarke resigns as Minister of Indigenous and Northern Relations but stays on as MLA for Agassiz.
- July 15 Blaine Pedersen resigns as Minister of Agriculture and Resource Development. He announces he will not seek re-election.
- August 10: Brian Pallister announces he will not seek re-election as the MLA for Fort Whyte and will resign as premier.
- September 1: Brian Pallister resigns as Premier and leader of the Progressive Conservative Party of Manitoba but remains as the MLA for Fort Whyte.
- September 1: Kelvin Goertzen is chosen by the Progressive Conservative Party of Manitoba to become its interim leader and the 23rd Premier of Manitoba. Rochelle Squires is appointed as the Deputy Premier.
- October 4: Brian Pallister resigns as the MLA for Fort Whyte, triggering a by-election.
- October 30: Heather Stefanson is elected as leader of the Progressive Conservative Party.
- November 2: Kelvin Goertzen resigns as Premier of Manitoba.
- November 2: Heather Stefanson is sworn in as the 24th Premier of Manitoba and is the first woman to hold the position.
- December 9: Danielle Adams (Thompson) dies in office, triggering a by-election.
- December 30: Ron Schuler is removed from cabinet post as Minister of Infrastructure. Reg Helwer is appointed as acting Minister of Infrastructure.

=== 2022 ===
- January 18: Premier Heather Stefanson shuffles her cabinet.
- March 22: Obby Khan is elected in the Fort Whyte by-election, replacing former Premier Brian Pallister. The Progressive Conservatives hold the seat narrowly.
- June 6: Scott Fielding resigns as Minister of Natural Resources and Northern Development, Minister responsible for Manitoba Liquor and Lotteries and announces his intention to resign as MLA for Kirkfield Park.
- June 6: Alan Lagimodiere is named acting Minister of Natural Resources and Northern Development, Minister responsible for Manitoba Liquor and Lotteries.
- June 7: Eric Redhead is elected as the MLA for Thompson, holding the seat for the NDP.
- June 17: Scott Fielding resigns as MLA for Kirkfield Park.
- June 28: The Keystone Party of Manitoba is formed.
- October 4: Ralph Eichler announces he will not seek re-election as MLA for Lakeside.
- December 16: Ian Wishart announces he will not seek re-election as MLA for Portage La Prairie.

=== 2023 ===
- January 15: Cathy Cox announces she Will not seek re-election as MLA for Kildonan River East.
- January 27: Cameron Friesen announces his resignation as finance minister and MLA to seek federal Conservative nomination for Portage—Lisgar.
- January 30: Cliff Cullen is appointed as finance minister and retains Deputy Premier role.
- June 13: Sarah Guillemard announces she will not seek re-election as MLA for Fort Richmond.

== Results ==
Results were formally declared on October 3, the night of the election. The NDP only finished four percentage points ahead of the Tories on the popular vote. However, they dominated Winnipeg, taking all but four seats in the capital. Eight members of Stefanson's cabinet were defeated, all in Winnipeg-based ridings. Stefanson herself was nearly defeated in her historically safe seat of Tuxedo, surviving by less than three percentage points.

Elections to the 43rd Manitoba Legislature
Party	Leader	Candidates	Seats					Popular vote		
Party	Leader	Candidates	2019	Dissolution	Elected	%	+/–	Votes	%	Change (pp)
New Democratic	Wab Kinew	57	18	18	34	59.65	+16	221,695	45.63	+14.25
Progressive Conservative	Heather Stefanson	57	36	35	22	38.60	–14	203,350	41.86	−5.21
Liberal	Dougald Lamont	49	3	3	1	1.75	–2	51,634	10.63	−3.85
Keystone	Kevin Friesen	5	–	–	–	–	−	3,727	0.77	New
Green	Janine Gibson	13	–	–	–	–	−	3,584	0.74	−5.63
Communist	Andrew Taylor	5	–	–	–	–	−	461	0.09	+0.04
Independents		3	–	–	–	–	−	1,383	0.28	+0.10
Vacant				1						
Valid votes		189	57	57	57	–	–	485,834	100.00	
Blank and invalid votes								3,374		
Total votes								489,208		
Registered voters/turnout								884,864	55.29	

=== Vote and seat summaries ===
Ternary plots of election results
2019

2023
Electoral districts won identified by PC (blue), Liberal (red) and NDP (orange).

Popular vote
NDP	45.63%
PC	41.86%
Liberal	10.63%
Others	1.88%

Seats
NDP	59.65%
PC	38.60%
Liberal	1.75%

=== Synopsis of results ===
2023 Manitoba general election – synopsis of riding results
Electoral division	Winning party								Votes							
Electoral division	2019	1st place	Votes	Share	Margin #	Margin %	2nd place	3rd place	NDP	PC	Lib	Green	Ind	KP	Comm	Total
Agassiz	PC	PC	4,519	63.85%	2,966	41.91%	NDP	KP	1,553	4,519	311	–	–	694	–	7,077
Assiniboia	PC	NDP	4,722	50.02%	916	9.70%	PC	Lib	4,722	3,806	913	–	–	–	–	9,441
Borderland	PC	PC	4,479	72.66%	3,558	57.72%	NDP	Lib	921	4,479	764	–	–	–	–	6,164
Brandon East	PC	NDP	3,758	55.64%	1,067	15.80%	PC	Lib	3,758	2,691	305	–	–	–	–	6,754
Brandon West	PC	PC	3,814	48.75%	89	1.14%	NDP	Green	3,725	3,814	–	284	–	–	–	7,823
Burrows	NDP	NDP	3,032	46.04%	958	14.55%	Lib	PC	3,032	1,479	2,074	–	–	–	–	6,585
Concordia	NDP	NDP	4,235	64.52%	2,387	36.37%	PC	Lib	4,235	1,848	481	–	–	–	–	6,564
Dauphin	PC	NDP	4,887	52.06%	386	4.11%	PC	N/A	4,887	4,501	–	–	–	–	–	9,388
Dawson Trail	PC	PC	4,592	50.70%	543	6.00%	NDP	Green	4,049	4,592	–	416	–	–	–	9,057
Elmwood	NDP	NDP	4,933	62.21%	2,745	34.62%	PC	Lib	4,933	2,188	452	304	–	–	52	7,929
Flin Flon	NDP	NDP	2,951	76.25%	2,032	52.51%	PC	N/A	2,951	919	–	–	–	–	–	3,870
Fort Garry	NDP	NDP	5,319	58.82%	2,914	32.22%	PC	Lib	5,319	2,405	1,082	237	–	–	–	9,043
Fort Richmond	PC	NDP	4,455	54.45%	1,576	19.26%	PC	Lib	4,455	2,879	848	–	–	–	–	8,182
Fort Rouge	NDP	NDP	6,761	70.57%	5,195	54.22%	PC	Lib	6,761	1,566	1,152	–	–	–	102	9,581
Fort Whyte	PC	PC	5,442	47.87%	1,229	10.81%	Lib	NDP	1,714	5,442	4,213	–	–	–	–	11,369
Interlake-Gimli	PC	PC	5,143	49.59%	683	6.59%	NDP	KP	4,460	5,143	374	–	–	393	–	10,370
Keewatinook	NDP	NDP	1,820	59.28%	762	24.82%	PC	Lib	1,820	1,058	192	–	–	–	–	3,070
Kildonan-River East	PC	NDP	5,574	49.26%	729	6.44%	PC	Lib	5,574	4,845	896	–	–	–	–	11,315
Kirkfield Park	PC	NDP	5,067	44.55%	661	5.81%	PC	Lib	5,067	4,406	1,696	205	–	–	–	11,374
La Vérendrye	PC	PC	4,586	61.02%	3,032	40.34%	NDP	KP	1,554	4,586	640	–	–	736	–	7,516
Lac du Bonnet	PC	PC	5,670	58.51%	2,223	22.94%	NDP	Green	3,447	5,670	–	573	–	–	–	9,690
Lagimodière	PC	NDP	5,711	46.24%	112	0.91%	PC	Lib	5,711	5,599	1,041	–	–	–	–	12,351
Lakeside	PC	PC	6,088	61.68%	3,406	34.51%	NDP	Lib	2,682	6,088	1,101	–	–	–	–	9,871
McPhillips	PC	NDP	4,905	47.30%	325	3.13%	PC	Lib	4,905	4,580	886	–	–	–	–	10,371
Midland	PC	PC	6,227	69.38%	4,216	46.97%	NDP	Lib	2,011	6,227	737	–	–	–	–	8,975
Morden-Winkler	PC	PC	5,135	73.47%	3,535	50.58%	NDP	Lib	1,600	5,135	254	–	–	–	–	6,989
Notre Dame	NDP	NDP	3,832	75.58%	3,100	61.14%	PC	Lib	3,832	732	319	105	–	–	82	5,070
Point Douglas	NDP	NDP	3,367	73.31%	2,625	57.15%	PC	Lib	3,367	742	484	–	–	–	–	4,593
Portage la Prairie	PC	PC	3,816	59.61%	1,898	29.65%	NDP	Green	1,918	3,816	301	367	–	–	–	6,402
Radisson	PC	NDP	5,954	52.31%	1,147	10.08%	PC	Lib	5,954	4,807	621	–	–	–	–	11,382
Red River North	PC	PC	5,926	60.35%	2,033	20.70%	NDP	N/A	3,893	5,926	–	–	–	–	–	9,819
Riding Mountain	PC	PC	5,644	63.02%	2,749	30.69%	NDP	Lib	2,895	5,644	417	–	–	–	–	8,956
Riel	PC	NDP	6,160	54.65%	1,882	16.70%	PC	Lib	6,160	4,278	834	–	–	–	–	11,272
River Heights	Lib	NDP	5,047	44.21%	643	5.63%	Lib	PC	5,047	1,807	4,404	158	–	–	–	11,416
Roblin	PC	PC	6,088	49.72%	1,120	9.15%	NDP	Lib	4,968	6,088	1,189	–	–	–	–	12,245
Rossmere	PC	NDP	4,863	50.74%	801	8.36%	PC	Lib	4,863	4,062	478	181	–	–	–	9,584
Seine River	PC	NDP	5,381	52.08%	1,407	13.62%	PC	Lib	5,381	3,974	846	–	131	–	–	10,332
Selkirk	PC	PC	4,963	52.49%	470	4.97%	NDP	N/A	4,493	4,963	–	–	–	–	–	9,456
Southdale	PC	NDP	5,569	48.48%	1,647	14.34%	PC	Lib	5,569	3,922	1,861	–	135	–	–	11,487
Springfield-Ritchot	PC	PC	5,752	54.89%	1,925	18.37%	NDP	Lib	3,827	5,752	900	–	–	–	–	10,479
Spruce Woods	PC	PC	4,986	61.81%	3,050	37.81%	NDP	Lib	1,936	4,986	1,145	–	–	–	–	8,067
St. Boniface	Lib	NDP	5,585	53.38%	2,172	20.76%	Lib	PC	5,585	1,391	3,413	–	–	–	73	10,462
St. James	NDP	NDP	5,448	64.82%	3,122	37.14%	PC	Lib	5,448	2,326	631	–	–	–	–	8,405
St. Johns	NDP	NDP	4,262	60.76%	3,145	44.83%	Ind	PC	4,262	1,101	535	–	1,117	–	–	7,015
St. Vital	NDP	NDP	5,288	61.15%	2,751	31.81%	PC	Lib	5,288	2,537	823	–	–	–	–	8,648
Steinbach	PC	PC	5,868	74.37%	4,647	58.90%	NDP	Lib	1,221	5,868	801	–	–	–	–	7,890
Swan River	PC	PC	4,801	62.91%	2,368	31.03%	NDP	KP	2,433	4,801	–	–	–	397	–	7,631
The Maples	NDP	NDP	3,905	56.13%	2,325	33.42%	PC	Lib	3,905	1,580	1,472	–	–	–	–	6,957
The Pas-Kameesak	NDP	NDP	3,522	67.18%	2,016	38.45%	PC	Lib	3,522	1,506	215	–	–	–	–	5,243
Thompson	NDP	NDP	2,887	68.28%	1,673	39.57%	PC	Lib	2,887	1,214	127	–	–	–	–	4,228
Transcona	NDP	NDP	5,235	58.50%	2,063	23.06%	PC	Lib	5,235	3,172	541	–	–	–	–	8,948
Turtle Mountain	PC	PC	4,806	55.05%	2,813	32.22%	NDP	KP	1,993	4,806	425	–	–	1,507	–	8,731
Tuxedo	PC	PC	3,968	40.21%	268	2.72%	NDP	Lib	3,700	3,968	2,201	–	–	–	–	9,869
Tyndall Park	Lib	Lib	4,030	54.99%	2,122	28.96%	NDP	PC	1,908	1,390	4,030	–	–	–	–	7,328
Union Station	NDP	NDP	3,714	70.78%	2,797	53.31%	PC	Lib	3,714	917	616	–	–	–	–	5,247
Waverley	PC	NDP	4,063	44.10%	115	1.25%	PC	Lib	4,063	3,948	1,001	201	–	–	–	9,213
Wolseley	NDP	NDP	6,582	75.31%	5,721	65.46%	PC	Lib	6,582	861	592	553	–	–	152	8,740

= open seat
= winning candidate was in previous Legislature
= incumbent had switched allegiance
= previously incumbent in another riding
= incumbency arose from a byelection gain
= not incumbent; was previously elected to the Legislature
= other incumbents renominated
= previously an MP in the House of Commons of Canada
= multiple candidates

=== Comparative analysis for ridings (2023 vs 2019) ===
==== Analytical charts ====
2023 vs 2019

2023 (by winning party)
2023 vs 2019

2023 (by party finishing second)
2023 vs 2019

2023
2023 vs 2019

2023 (by winning party)

=== Turnout, winning shares and swings ===
Summary of riding results by turnout, vote share for winning candidate, and swing (vs 2019)
Riding and winning party			Turnout		Vote share (Note: Share won by winning candidate, with difference noted from share achieved by the same party in 2019.)		Swing (Note: Positive indicates improvement to standing of party winning in 2019; negative points to 2019's second-place party being swung to.)	
Riding and winning party			%	Change (pp)	%	Change (pp)	To	Change (pp)
Agassiz	PC	Hold	53.35	−2.70	63.85	−11.67	NDP	−10.42
Assiniboia	NDP	Gain	55.70	1.00	50.02	14.55	NDP	−9.25
Borderland	PC	Hold	50.45	−11.41	72.66	6.57	PC	5.38
Brandon East	NDP	Gain	46.99	1.30	55.64	19.30	NDP	−15.23
Brandon West	PC	Hold	51.68	0.41	48.75	−9.64	NDP	−16.73
Burrows	NDP	Hold	44.64	−1.43	46.04	6.35	NDP	5.00
Concordia	NDP	Hold	44.03	−4.43	64.52	4.83	NDP	4.25
Dauphin	NDP	Gain	60.30	1.68	52.06	9.67	NDP	−6.12
Dawson Trail	PC	Hold	56.86	−0.98	50.70	−4.71	N/A (Note: a Liberal candidate came in second in 2019, but did not stand in 2023)	
Elmwood	NDP	Hold	49.32	−0.90	62.21	13.53	NDP	8.88
Flin Flon	NDP	Hold	44.17	10.26	76.25	13.06	NDP	8.17
Fort Garry	NDP	Hold	58.75	−2.94	58.82	16.47	NDP	10.84
Fort Richmond	NDP	Gain	62.07	4.68	54.45	32.24	PC	6.70
Fort Rouge	NDP	Hold	58.04	−0.73	70.57	19.33	NDP	10.90
Fort Whyte	PC	Hold	64.37	4.02	47.87	−9.32	NDP	−3.26
Interlake-Gimli	PC	Hold	65.04	−0.52	49.59	−9.03	NDP	−9.48
Keewatinook	NDP	Hold	39.14	17.29	59.28	−7.80	NDP	2.26
Kildonan-River East	NDP	Gain	63.18	1.36	49.26	15.23	NDP	−11.75
Kirkfield Park	NDP	Gain	63.76	2.51	44.55	18.87	NDP	−15.24
La Vérendrye	PC	Hold	55.54	0.13	61.02	−11.77	NDP	−9.06
Lac du Bonnet	PC	Hold	60.77	−0.46	58.51	−7.40	NDP	−11.81
Lagimodière	NDP	Gain	64.05	1.78	46.24	18.37	NDP	−12.41
Lakeside	PC	Hold	60.98	1.76	61.68	−6.56	NDP	−5.75
McPhillips	NDP	Gain	54.61	−2.03	47.30	10.10	NDP	−2.07
Midland	PC	Hold	56.95	−2.32	69.38	−5.63	NDP	−6.34
Morden-Winkler	PC	Hold	44.32	−6.87	73.47	−7.39	N/A (Note: a Green candidate came in second in 2019, but did not stand in 2023)	
Notre Dame	NDP	Hold	37.88	−2.98	75.58	10.58	NDP	5.61
Point Douglas	NDP	Hold	32.76	−3.24	73.31	10.96	NDP	4.99
Portage la Prairie	PC	Hold	46.77	−1.87	59.61	−6.07	NDP	−7.01
Radisson	NDP	Gain	57.65	1.18	52.31	15.61	NDP	−10.17
Red River North	PC	Hold	60.47	−3.49	60.35	2.38	NDP	−6.20
Riding Mountain	PC	Hold	57.42	1.69	63.02	−2.89	NDP	−7.01
Riel	NDP	Gain	65.70	2.46	54.65	19.26	NDP	−13.03
River Heights	NDP	Gain	67.59	2.12	44.21	29.63	PC	−3.17
Roblin	PC	Hold	62.54	0.71	49.72	−5.47	NDP	−14.02
Rossmere	NDP	Gain	60.42	0.80	50.74	11.89	NDP	−8.21
Seine River	NDP	Gain	63.64	1.52	52.08	26.07	NDP	−16.32
Selkirk	PC	Hold	56.29	−2.96	52.49	0.65	NDP	−5.72
Southdale	NDP	Gain	64.72	3.06	48.48	10.64	NDP	−9.45
Springfield-Ritchot	PC	Hold	58.30	−2.27	54.89	−4.59	NDP	−10.16
Spruce Woods	PC	Hold	56.54	−0.21	61.81	−6.26	NDP	−7.19
St. Boniface	NDP	Gain	60.06	0.28	53.38	23.51	NDP	−16.29
St. James	NDP	Hold	54.68	−1.11	64.82	17.56	NDP	11.36
St. Johns	NDP	Hold	46.98	−0.36	60.76	8.88	NDP	8.83
St. Vital	NDP	Hold	56.88	−3.89	61.15	16.67	NDP	11.12
Steinbach	PC	Hold	48.14	−4.35	74.37	−7.26	NDP	−7.34
Swan River	PC	Hold	57.90	3.03	62.91	−5.95	NDP	−5.98
The Maples	NDP	Hold	50.62	−2.46	56.13	16.62	NDP	12.61
The Pas-Kameesak	NDP	Hold	53.52	10.48	67.18	9.27	NDP	2.44
Thompson	NDP	Hold	36.10	−1.17	68.28	13.73	NDP	10.35
Transcona	NDP	Hold	51.40	−1.05	58.50	12.09	NDP	10.88
Turtle Mountain	PC	Hold	55.64	−1.65	55.05	−12.43	N/A	
Tuxedo	PC	Hold	59.86	1.96	40.21	−7.65	Lib	−3.19
Tyndall Park	Lib	Hold	49.75	−6.64	54.99	0.32	Lib	2.42
Union Station	NDP	Hold	42.21	−1.85	70.78	18.16	NDP	12.58
Waverley	NDP	Gain	53.97	2.02	44.10	15.50	NDP	−11.35
Wolseley	NDP	Hold	53.77	−3.19	75.31	29.28	NDP	29.47

=== Changes in party shares ===
Share change analysis by party and riding (2023 vs 2019)
Riding	Green		Liberal		NDP		PC	
Riding	%	Change (pp)	%	Change (pp)	%	Change (pp)	%	Change (pp)
Agassiz	–	−5.57	4.39	−1.74	21.94	9.17	63.85	−11.67
Assiniboia	–	−6.85	9.67	−3.76	50.02	14.55	40.31	−3.94
Borderland	–	−3.38	12.39	−4.19	14.94	11.01	72.66	6.57
Brandon East			4.52	−8.15	55.64	19.30	39.84	−11.16
Brandon West	3.63	−6.50	–	−7.68	47.62	23.82	48.75	−9.64
Burrows			31.50	13.19	46.04	6.35	22.46	−3.66
Concordia			7.33	−1.16	64.52	4.83	28.15	−3.67
Dauphin			–	−7.10	52.06	9.67	47.94	−2.57
Dawson Trail	4.59	4.59	–	−22.87	44.71	22.99	50.70	−4.71
Elmwood	3.83	−5.75	5.70	−3.65	62.21	13.53	27.59	−4.23
Flin Flon	–	−3.82	–	−5.95	76.25	13.06	23.75	−3.28
Fort Garry	2.62	−5.03	11.97	−6.22	58.82	16.47	26.60	−5.22
Fort Richmond	–	−4.93	10.36	−20.36	54.45	32.24	35.19	−6.96
Fort Rouge	–	−16.01	12.02	−1.05	70.57	19.33	16.34	−2.48
Fort Whyte	–	−6.77	37.06	19.44	15.08	−2.81	47.87	−9.32
Interlake-Gimli	–	−4.50	3.61	−0.20	43.01	9.94	49.59	−9.03
Keewatinook			6.25	−12.32	59.28	−7.80	34.46	20.12
Kildonan-River East			7.92	−6.95	49.26	15.23	42.82	−8.28
Kirkfield Park	1.80	−6.48	14.91	−0.76	44.55	18.87	38.74	−11.62
La Vérendrye			8.52	−4.36	20.68	6.34	61.02	−11.77
Lac du Bonnet	5.91	5.91	–	−14.74	35.57	16.22	58.51	−7.40
Lagimodière	–	−5.56	8.43	−6.36	46.24	18.37	45.33	−6.45
Lakeside			11.15	1.64	27.17	4.93	61.68	−6.56
McPhillips	–	−4.71	8.54	−8.58	47.30	10.10	44.16	5.97
Midland			8.21	−1.43	22.41	7.06	69.38	−5.63
Morden-Winkler	–	−10.64	3.63	−0.03	22.89	18.06	73.47	−7.39
Notre Dame	2.07	−3.00	6.29	−7.37	75.58	10.58	14.44	−0.65
Point Douglas	–	−8.23	10.54	−1.27	73.31	10.96	16.16	0.99
Portage la Prairie	5.73	5.73	4.70	−7.63	29.96	7.96	59.61	−6.07
Radisson	–	−5.93	5.46	−4.94	52.31	15.61	42.23	−4.73
Red River North	–	−7.70	–	−7.65	39.65	14.78	60.35	2.38
Riding Mountain	–	−7.81	4.66	−0.42	32.32	11.13	63.02	−2.89
Riel	–	−5.96	7.40	−6.51	54.65	19.26	37.95	−6.80
River Heights	1.38	−5.54	38.58	−15.22	44.21	29.63	15.83	−8.87
Roblin	–	−11.02	9.71	−6.08	40.57	22.57	49.72	−5.47
Rossmere	1.89	−4.72	4.99	−2.65	50.74	11.89	42.38	−4.53
Seine River	–	−6.79	8.19	−13.97	52.08	26.07	38.46	−6.58
Selkirk	–	−7.62	–	−5.13	47.51	12.10	52.49	0.65
Southdale	–	−5.62	16.20	2.73	48.48	10.64	34.14	−8.26
Springfield-Ritchot	–	−11.18	8.59	0.05	36.52	15.73	54.89	−4.59
Spruce Woods	–	−9.85	14.19	7.98	24.00	8.13	61.81	−6.26
St. Boniface	–	−8.48	32.62	−9.06	53.38	23.51	13.30	−5.85
St. James	–	−9.52	7.51	−2.88	64.82	17.56	27.67	−5.16
St. Johns	–	−7.40	7.63	−8.62	60.76	8.88	15.69	−8.78
St. Vital	–	−5.46	9.52	−4.33	61.15	16.67	29.34	−5.56
Steinbach	–	−5.47	10.15	5.31	15.48	7.42	74.37	−7.26
Swan River			–	−5.25	31.88	6.00	62.91	−5.95
The Maples	–	−4.09	21.16	−8.60	56.13	16.62	22.71	−3.93
The Pas-Kameesak	–	−14.38	4.10	0.71	67.18	9.27	28.72	4.40
Thompson	–	−6.05	3.00	−0.71	68.28	13.73	28.71	−6.97
Transcona			6.05	−2.41	58.50	12.09	35.45	−9.68
Turtle Mountain	–	−14.91	4.87	−1.85	22.83	11.93	55.05	−12.43
Tuxedo	–	−8.17	22.30	−1.26	37.49	17.70	40.21	−7.65
Tyndall Park	–	−2.00	54.99	0.32	26.04	−4.51	18.97	6.46
Union Station	–	−9.72	11.74	−6.99	70.78	18.16	17.48	0.32
Waverley	2.18	−2.78	10.87	−5.53	44.10	15.50	42.85	−7.19
Wolseley	6.33	−29.67	6.77	−1.61	75.31	29.28	9.85	0.82

= did not field a candidate in 2019

=== Results by riding ===
Riding	Outgoing MLA	Elected MLA
Agassiz	Eileen Clarke	Jodie Byram
Assiniboia	Scott Johnston	Nellie Kennedy
Borderland	Josh Guenter	Josh Guenter
Brandon East	Len Isleifson	Glen Simard
Brandon West	Reg Helwer	Wayne Balcaen
Burrows	Diljeet Brar	Diljeet Brar
Concordia	Matt Wiebe	Matt Wiebe
Dauphin	Brad Michaleski	Ron Kostyshyn
Dawson Trail	Bob Lagassé	Bob Lagassé
Elmwood	Jim Maloway	Jim Maloway
Flin Flon	Tom Lindsey	Tom Lindsey
Fort Garry	Mark Wasyliw	Mark Wasyliw
Fort Richmond	Sarah Guillemard	Jennifer Chen
Fort Rouge	Wab Kinew	Wab Kinew
Fort Whyte	Obby Khan	Obby Khan
Interlake-Gimli	Derek Johnson	Derek Johnson
Keewatinook	Ian Bushie	Ian Bushie
Kildonan-River East	Cathy Cox	Rachelle Schott
Kirkfield Park	Kevin Klein	Logan Oxenham
La Verendrye	Dennis Smook	Konrad Narth
Lac du Bonnet	Wayne Ewasko	Wayne Ewasko
Lagimodière	Andrew Smith	Tyler Blashko
Lakeside	Ralph Eichler	Trevor King
McPhillips	Shannon Martin	Jasdeep Devgan
Midland	Blaine Pedersen	Lauren Stone
Morden-Winkler	Cameron Friesen	Carrie Hiebert
Notre Dame	Malaya Marcelino	Malaya Marcelino
Point Douglas	Bernadette Smith	Bernadette Smith
Portage la Prairie	Ian Wishart	Jeff Bereza
Radisson	James Teitsma	Jelynn Dela Cruz
Red River North	Jeff Wharton	Jeff Wharton
Riding Mountain	Greg Nesbitt	Greg Nesbitt
Riel	Rochelle Squires	Mike Moyes
River Heights	Jon Gerrard	Mike Moroz
Roblin	Myrna Driedger	Kathleen Cook
Rossmere	Andrew Micklefield	Tracy Schmidt
Seine River	Janice Morley-Lecomte	Billie Cross
Selkirk	Alan Lagimodiere	Richard Perchotte
Southdale	Audrey Gordon	Renée Cable
Springfield-Ritchot	Ron Schuler	Ron Schuler
Spruce Woods	Cliff Cullen	Grant Jackson
St. Boniface	Dougald Lamont	Robert Loiselle
St. James	Adrien Sala	Adrien Sala
St. Johns	Nahanni Fontaine	Nahanni Fontaine
St. Vital	Jamie Moses	Jamie Moses
Steinbach	Kelvin Goertzen	Kelvin Goertzen
Swan River	Rick Wowchuk	Rick Wowchuk
The Maples	Mintu Sandhu	Mintu Sandhu
The Pas-Kameesak	Amanda Lathlin	Amanda Lathlin
Thompson	Eric Redhead	Eric Redhead
Transcona	Nello Altomare	Nello Altomare
Turtle Mountain	Doyle Piwniuk	Doyle Piwniuk
Tuxedo	Heather Stefanson	Heather Stefanson
Tyndall Park	Cindy Lamoureux	Cindy Lamoureux
Union Station	Uzoma Asagwara	Uzoma Asagwara
Waverley	Jon Reyes	David Pankratz
Wolseley	Lisa Naylor	Lisa Naylor

=== Analysis ===
Party candidates in 2nd place
Party in 1st place	Party in 2nd place				Total
Party in 1st place	NDP	PC	Lib	Ind	Total
New Democratic		30	3	1	34
Progressive Conservative	21		1		22
Liberal	1				1
Total	22	30	4	1	57

Candidates ranked 1st to 5th place, by party
Parties	1st	2nd	3rd	4th	5th
█ New Democratic	34	22	1		
█ Progressive Conservative	22	30	5		
█ Liberal	1	4	38	6	
█ Independent		1		2	
█ Keystone			5		
█ Green			4	9	
█ Communist				2	3

Resulting composition of the 43rd Manitoba Legislature
Source		Party			
Source		NDP	PC	Lib	Total
Seats retained	Incumbents returned	18	12	1	31
Seats retained	Open seats held		10		10
Seats changing hands	Incumbents defeated	12			12
Seats changing hands	Open seats gained	4			4
Total		34	22	1	57

=== Aftermath ===
Liberal leader Dougald Lamont resigned on election night following a dismal performance for his party. Both he and Jon Gerrard lost their seats to NDP challengers, leaving Cindy Lamoureux as the sole Liberal in the legislative assembly. Outgoing premier and PC leader Heather Stefanson also announced her resignation as party leader on election night.

=== Seats changing hands ===
==== Defeated MLAs ====
Constituency	Party	Name	Year elected	Seat held by party since	Defeated by	Party
St. Boniface	█ Liberal	Dougald Lamont	2018 b.e	2018 b.e	Robert Loiselle	█ New Democratic
River Heights	█ Liberal	Jon Gerrard	1999	1999	Mike Moroz	█ New Democratic
Southdale	█ Progressive Conservative	Audrey Gordon	2019	2016	Renée Cable	█ New Democratic
Kirkfield Park	█ Progressive Conservative	Kevin Klein	2022	2016	Logan Oxenham	█ New Democratic
Radisson	█ Progressive Conservative	James Teitsma	2016	2016	Jelynn Dela Cruz	█ New Democratic
Seine River	█ Progressive Conservative	Janice Morley-Lecomte	2016	2016	Billie Cross	█ New Democratic
Waverley	█ Progressive Conservative	Jon Reyes	2016	2019 (District Created)	David Pankratz	█ New Democratic
Brandon East	█ Progressive Conservative	Len Isleifson	2016	2016	Glen Simard	█ New Democratic
Riel	█ Progressive Conservative	Rochelle Squires	2016	2016	Mike Moyes	█ New Democratic
Lagimodière	█ Progressive Conservative	Andrew Smith	2016	2019 (District Created)	Tyler Blashko	█ New Democratic
Assiniboia	█ Progressive Conservative	Scott Johnston	2016	2016	Nellie Kennedy	█ New Democratic
Rossmere	█ Progressive Conservative	Andrew Micklefield	2016	2016	Tracy Schmidt	█ New Democratic

==== Open seats ====
Constituency	Party	Candidate	Incumbent retiring from the legislature	Won by	Party
Fort Richmond	█ Progressive Conservative	Paramjit Shahi	Sarah Guillemard	Jennifer Chen	█ New Democratic
Kildonan-River East	█ Progressive Conservative	Alana Vannahme	Cathy Cox	Rachelle Schott	█ New Democratic
McPhillips	█ Progressive Conservative	Sheilah Restall	Shannon Martin	Jasdeep Devgan	█ New Democratic
Dauphin	█ Progressive Conservative	Gord Wood	Brad Michaleski	Ron Kostyshyn	█ New Democratic

== Marginal seats ==
=== Previous marginal seats ===
Seats in the 2019 general election which were won by under 10%

Seat	2019 held		2023 winner	
Seat	Party	Margin	Party	Margin
McPhillips	PC	1.00%	NDP	3.02%
Transcona	NDP	1.29%	NDP	23.06%
Southdale	PC	4.56%	NDP	14.32%
Rossmere	PC	8.06%	NDP	8.29%
Dauphin	PC	8.13%	NDP	3.28%
Assiniboia	PC	8.79%	NDP	9.69%
Riel	PC	9.36%	NDP	16.61%
St. Vital	NDP	9.58%	NDP	30.79%
The Maples	NDP	9.75%	NDP	32.33%
Wolseley	NDP	9.98%	NDP	65.42%

=== New marginal seats ===
Seats in this general election which were won by under 10%.

Seat	2019 held		2023 Winner	
Seat	Party	Margin	Party	Margin
Lagimodière	PC	23.91%	NDP	0.84%
Brandon West	PC	24.59%	PC	1.22%
Waverley	PC	21.45%	NDP	1.30%
Tuxedo	PC	24.57%	PC	2.65%
McPhillips	PC	1.00%	NDP	3.02%
Dauphin	PC	8.13%	NDP	3.28%
Selkirk	PC	16.42%	PC	4.98%
River Heights	Lib	29.09%	NDP	5.58%
Kirkfield Park	PC	24.68%	NDP	5.94%
Interlake-Gimli	PC	25.55%	PC	6.59%
Kildonan-River East	PC	17.06%	NDP	6.71%
Rossmere	PC	8.06%	NDP	8.29%
Dawson Trail	PC	32.54%	PC	8.90%
Roblin	PC	37.19%	PC	9.15%
Assiniboia	PC	8.79%	NDP	9.69%

== Opinion polls ==
Graph of opinion polls conducted. Trend lines represent local regressions.

Voting intentions in Manitoba since the 2019 election
Polling firm	Dates conducted	Source	PC	NDP	Liberal	Green	Others	Margin of error	Sample size	Polling method	Lead
Forum Research	Oct 2, 2023		41.3%	44.7%	12.3%	0.9%	0.8%	3.3%	910	IVR	3.4%
Research Co.	Sep 30–Oct 2, 2023		39%	48%	10%	2%	1%	4%	600	Online	9%
Mainstreet Research	Sep 28–Oct 1, 2023		41%	47%	10%	1%	1%	3.7%	698	Smart IVR	6%
Sovereign North Strategies	Sep 17–19, 2023		42.5%	39.4%	15.9%	2.2%	N/A	3.9%	852	Telephone	3.1%
Angus Reid	Sep 13–19, 2023		41%	47%	9%	2%	1%	4%	990	Online	6%
Probe Research	Sep 7–18, 2023		38%	49%	9%	2%	2%	3.1%	1,000	Online	11%
Research Co.	Sep 15–17, 2023		39%	41%	14%	3%	2%	4%	600	Online	2%
Counsel Public Affairs	Sep 11–16, 2023		39%	44%	13%	2%	2%	4%	505	Online	5%
Mainstreet Research	Aug 28 – Sep 2, 2023		43%	42%	9%	3%	3%	4%	601	Smart IVR	1%
Mainstreet Research	Jul 26–28, 2023		42%	38%	12%	3%	4%	4%	597	Smart IVR	4%
Probe Research	May 31 – Jun 13, 2023		41%	41%	10%	5%	3%	3.1%	1,000	Online	Tie
Angus Reid	May 30 – Jun 3, 2023		39%	44%	10%	4%	4%	4%	515	Online	5%
	March 26, 2023	Janine Gibson is elected leader of the Green Party of Manitoba									
Probe Research	Mar 8–20, 2023		38%	44%	9%	4%	4%	3.1%	1,000	Online	6%
Mainstreet Research	Jan 24–26, 2023		36.2%	41.5%	14.6%	5.1%	2.1%	4.3%	514	Smart IVR	5.3%
Probe Research	Nov 22 – Dec 5, 2022		35%	46%	13%	3%	2%	3.1%	1,000	Telephone/Online	11%
Probe Research	Sep 8–18, 2022		37%	44%	15%	3%	1%	3.1%	1,000	Telephone	7%
Angus Reid	Jun 7–13, 2022		38%	40%	13%	3%	6%	5%	468	Online	2%
Probe Research	Jun 1–12, 2022		35%	45%	13%	3%	4%	3.1%	1,000	Telephone	10%
Probe Research	Mar 9–21, 2022		34%	44%	15%	2%	5%	3.1%	1,000	Telephone	10%
Angus Reid	Mar 10–15, 2022		39%	40%	14%	3%	5%	4%	475	Online	1%
Angus Reid	Jan 7–12, 2022		36%	42%	12%	3%	6%	5%	407	Online	6%
Probe Research	Nov 23 – Dec 5, 2021		37%	42%	12%	4%	5%	3.1%	1,000	Telephone	5%
	October 30, 2021	Heather Stefanson is elected leader of the Manitoba Progressive Conservative Party									
Innovative Research	Sep 24 – Oct 5, 2021		41%	32%	18%	5%	3%	N/A	678	Online	9%
Angus Reid	Sep 29 – Oct 3, 2021		38%	43%	11%	4%	5%	N/A	435	Online	5%
Probe Research	Sep 7–20, 2021		35%	42%	12%	3%	8%	3.1%	1,000	Telephone	7%
Probe Research	Jun 2–11, 2021		29%	47%	14%	5%	5%	3.1%	1,000	Telephone	18%
Angus Reid	Jun 2–7, 2021		39%	42%	11%	4%	4%	4.0%	504	Online	3%
Probe Research	Mar 10–26, 2021		36%	42%	11%	7%	4%	3.1%	1,000	Telephone	6%
Probe Research	Nov 24 – Dec 4, 2020		37%	41%	14%	6%	3%	3.1%	1,000	Telephone	4%
Angus Reid	Nov 24–30, 2020		39%	40%	12%	5%	4%	4.8%	420	Online	1%
Probe Research	Sep 8–17, 2020		43%	34%	16%	5%	3%	3.1%	1,000	Telephone	9%
EKOS	Jul 24 – Aug 26, 2020		44%	31%	12%	9%	4%	2.9%	1,154	HD-IVR	13%
EKOS	Jun 16 – Jul 23, 2020		43%	27%	18%	7%	5%	2.4%	1,691	HD-IVR	16%
Probe Research	Jun 2–11, 2020		38%	36%	18%	7%	2%	3.1%	1,000	Telephone	2%
Innovative Research	May 29 – Jun 3, 2020		38%	26%	26%	10%	N/A	N/A	200	Online	12%
Probe Research	Mar 10–24, 2020		43%	33%	14%	8%	2%	3.1%	1,000	Telephone	10%
Probe Research	Nov 27 – Dec 10, 2019		42%	36%	13%	8%	2%	3.1%	1,000	Telephone	6%
2019 general election	September 10, 2019	—	47.1%	31.4%	14.5%	6.4%	0.6%	—	—	—	15.7%
Polling firm	Dates conducted	Source					Others	Margin of error	Sample size	Polling method	Lead
Polling firm	Dates conducted	Source	PC	NDP	Liberal	Green	Others	Margin of error	Sample size	Polling method	Lead

== See also ==
- 2023 Alberta general election
- 2023 Prince Edward Island general election
- 2023 Canadian electoral calendar
