= Obby Khan =

Canadian politician and football player (born 1980)

Obby Khan MLA
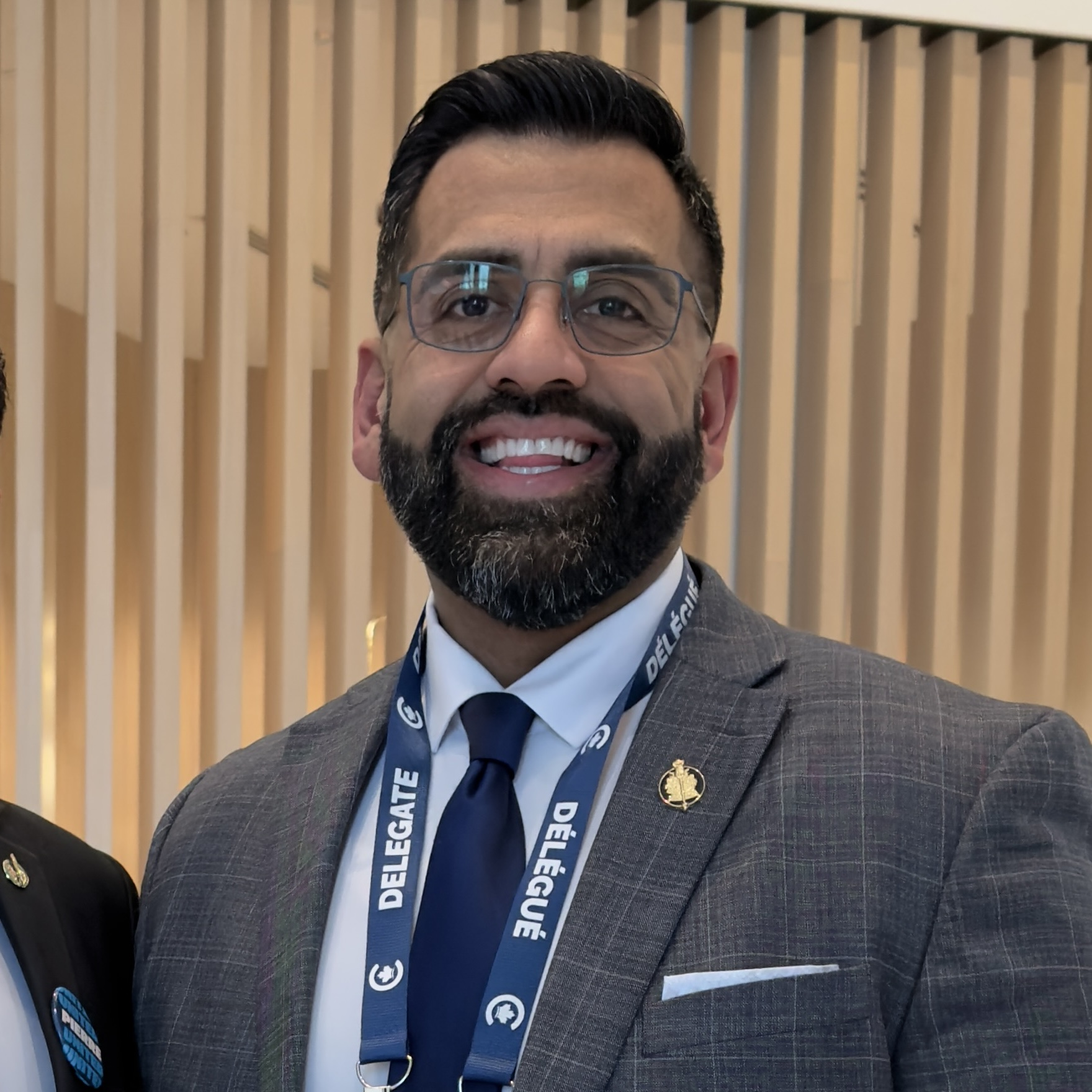
- Khan in 2026

Leader of the Opposition of Manitoba
- In office April 26, 2025 – September 28, 2026
- Preceded by: Wayne Ewasko
- Succeeded by: Konrad Narth

Leader of the Progressive Conservative Party of Manitoba
- In office April 26, 2025 – September 28, 2026
- Preceded by: Wayne Ewasko (interim)
- Succeeded by: Konrad Narth (interim)

Minister of Sport, Culture and Heritage
- In office January 30, 2023 – October 18, 2023
- Premier: Heather Stefanson
- Preceded by: Andrew Smith
- Succeeded by: Glen Simard

Member of the Legislative Assembly of Manitoba for Fort Whyte
- Incumbent
- Assumed office March 22, 2022
- Preceded by: Brian Pallister

Personal details
- Born: Ibrahim Khan; October 8, 1980 (age 46) Ottawa, Ontario, Canada
- Party: Independent (2026–present)
- Other political affiliations: Progressive Conservative (before 2026)
- Education: Simon Fraser University (BSc)
- Occupation: Football player; businessman; politician
- Football career

No. 60
- Positions: Centre, Guard, Offensive tackle

Personal information
- Listed height: 6 ft 3 in (1.91 m)
- Listed weight: 280 lb (127 kg)

Career information
- University: Simon Fraser
- CFL draft: 2004: 1st round, 2nd overall pick

Career history
- 2004–2005: Ottawa Renegades
- 2006–2011: Winnipeg Blue Bombers
- 2012: Calgary Stampeders

Awards and highlights
- J. P. Metras Trophy (2003)
- Stats at CFL.ca (archive)

Ibrahim "Obby" Khan (born 8 October 1980) is a Canadian politician, entrepreneur and former professional Canadian football player who was a centre for nine seasons in the Canadian Football League with the Ottawa Renegades, Winnipeg Blue Bombers, and Calgary Stampeders. Formerly a member of the Progressive Conservative Party of Manitoba, he served as its leader from 2025 to 2026. He now sits as an independent.

In March 2022, he was elected to the Legislative Assembly of Manitoba (MLA) to represent the riding of Fort Whyte. He was elected in a by-election, following the resignation of former premier Brian Pallister, narrowly beating Willard Reaves, the Liberal candidate and another former Winnipeg Blue Bomber. He narrowly won the 2025 Progressive Conservative Party of Manitoba leadership election, defeating businessman Wally Daudrich, becoming the leader of the Opposition. He is the first Muslim and South Asian to serve as leader of the PC party.

== Early life ==
Ibrahim "Obby" Khan was born on 8 October 1980 in Ottawa, Ontario, to a Muslim-Canadian family of Pakistani heritage. For high-school, Khan attended Sir Wilfrid Laurier Secondary School and played football and rugby. He also played minor football for the Gloucester Dukes.

In university, Khan played CIS football with the Simon Fraser Clan, winning the J. P. Metras Trophy as the top lineman in Canadian university football in 2003. The following year, Khan was one of three Canadians to participate in the 2004 East-West Shrine Game, an all-star game for graduating college players, mainly from the United States.

== Professional football career ==
Khan was selected with the second overall pick of the 2004 CFL draft by the Ottawa Renegades and signed with the team on 19 May 2004. He dressed for the Renegades during the first two games of the 2004 CFL season but did not see action. In Game 3 versus Edmonton, he saw the first live action of his CFL career. In Game 7 versus Calgary, he got the first start of his pro career at right guard. In Game 8 at BC, he started for the second time in as many weeks against the Lions. In Game 9 versus Hamilton he backed-up Mike Sutherland at right guard. He also had a special teams' tackle. In Game 10 versus Edmonton, he backed-up Alexandre Gauthier at left tackle and had a special teams' tackle. In Game 11 versus Montreal, Khan began the game as a back-up and filled in well for centre George Hudson when he went down with a back injury. He started Game 12 versus BC he started as centre against the Lions.

Khan started five of 15 games for the Ottawa Renegades in the 2005 CFL season, sitting out three games due to injury. He was one of the 'Gades most versatile offensive linemen, seeing playing time at guard, centre and tackle.

In the 2006 CFL season, the Winnipeg Blue Bombers acquired Khan as their first selection in the Ottawa Dispersal Draft. He was the only member of the Blue Bombers’ offensive line to start all 18 regular season games as well as the football club's East Semifinal contest with the Toronto Argonauts. Khan had never played centre at the pro level until being shifted there during training camp. Khan's solid play helped running back Charles Roberts rush for a league-leading 1,609 yards on 303 carries. His contributions did not go unnoticed. Khan was named the co-winner of the CJOB Offensive Player of the Game Award in Week 8 versus the Hamilton Tiger-Cats. He and the rest of the Bombers' offensive line turned in another performance in the East Semifinal. The Big Blue rushed for 200 yards, including 179 by Roberts, in a losing cause. Khan was recognized in the CFL's post-season awards as the Bombers' nominee as Outstanding Offensive Lineman.

On 25 April 2012, Khan announced his retirement after eight seasons in the Canadian Football League.

On 14 August 2012, the Calgary Stampeders announced that Khan had come out of retirement and signed with the team. He was released by the Stampeders on 11 March 2013.

== Post-football career ==
Khan owned and operated Shawarma Khan, a Winnipeg-based halal shawarma restaurant. Shawarma Khan had four locations within Winnipeg: Exchange District, Pembina Highway, Graham Avenue, and a concession stand at Princess Auto Stadium under the name "Shawarma Khan In a Snap".They have all closed as of 2026.

Khan also co-created and co-owns Green Carrot Juice Company, a fresh cold-press juice business in three Winnipeg locations: Osborne Village, Airport, and Tuxedo. The Osborne Village business was evicted in August 2025.

In November 2020, Khan and business partner Ali Esmail launched GoodLocal.ca, an online marketplace for local Winnipeg businesses. GoodLocal, which co-owner Esmail wanted to name LoveLocalMarket, started out in the basement of Shawarma Khan (Graham Ave) and had 100 vendors. Good Local later increased their vendor count to 388, and generated $850,000 in sales. On 26 November 2021, the company opened its first physical location in Winnipeg's Exchange District. GoodLocal was closed in 2022.

== Political career ==
In January 2022, Khan sought the nomination of the Progressive Conservative Party of Manitoba's candidate in 2022 by-election in Fort Whyte. On 12 February 2022, Khan won the nomination vote for the Fort Whyte by-election that was scheduled to take place on March 22 of that year.

On March 4, 2022, opposition parties questioned a $500,000 grant that was awarded to Khan's business Good Local as part of a $1.5-million provincial program aimed to promote shop local efforts. Of the $1.5 million, $500,000 was given to Khan's business, $409,000 was spent on various programs through the chamber of commerce, while $536,000 remained unspent. Chuck Davidson, president of the Manitoba Chamber of Commerce, credited the grant for creating nine full-time jobs and eighteen part-time jobs at GoodLocal. Liberal leader Dougald Lamont questioned whether the process for awarding this grant was fair; he also cited other business that did not receive financial aid from the government. The PC Party responded to the accusations of favouritism by listing other financial programs that were implemented during the COVID-19 pandemic.

On 22 March 2022, Khan defeated Liberal candidate Willard Reaves, both retired Winnipeg Blue Bombers, in an unusually close race for what had previously been a safe seat for the Progressive Conservatives, having previously been represented by two PC leaders (Pallister and, before him, Hugh McFadyen). This result was the first time a Progressive Conservative candidate had failed to receive an outright majority of votes in the riding, and the result was reported as a "wakeup call" for the PCs by the Winnipeg Sun.

Khan's election made him the first Muslim elected to the Legislative Assembly of Manitoba. Khan stated that the result was "a huge honour" noting that he was "one of the first East Indians to play in the CFL, now the first Canadian Muslim to be elected [to the Manitoba Legislative Assembly]."

Khan was re-elected in the 2023 provincial election. On October 24, 2023, he was appointed as the Shadow Minister for Finance and as the Shadow Minister for the Manitoba Public Service.

On 21 August 2024, Khan announced his intent to run for leader of the Progressive Conservative Party of Manitoba in the party leadership race. He narrowly won the leadership election, defeating businessman Wally Daudrich, becoming the leader of the Opposition. He is the first person of colour to serve as leader of the PC party.

In May 2025, during Khan's first legislative speech as party leader, he apologized for PC campaign ads in the 2023 election that promoted their decision not to search for two victims' bodies in the 2022 Winnipeg serial killings. During the leadership race, Khan had supported the apology made by interim leader Wayne Ewasko but refused to call the decision a mistake, saying that it was based on the information available at the time and that he would give his full opinion after the race.

In 2026, Khan was criticized by Speaker Tom Lindsey for making the comments "you are a terrible person, whatever you are" to deputy premier Uzoma Asagwara.

In September 2026, citing internal party conflicts he resigned as leader of the PCs and from the PC caucus. While also stating his intention to remain as MLA. The party selected Konrad Narth as interim leader the next day.

== Electoral record ==
2023 Manitoba general election: Fort Whyte
| Party | Candidate | Votes | % | ±% | Expenditures |
|---|---|---|---|---|---|
| Progressive Conservative | Obby Khan | 5,442 | 47.87 | −9.32 | $45,057.75 |
| Liberal | Willard Reaves | 4,213 | 37.06 | +19.44 | $19,578.06 |
| New Democratic | Trudy Schroeder | 1,714 | 15.08 | −2.81 | $0.00 |
| Total valid votes/expense limit | | 11,369 | 99.61 | – | $66,506.00 |
| Total rejected and declined ballots | | 45 | 0.39 | – | |
| Turnout | | 11,414 | 64.37 | +4.02 | |
| Eligible voters | | 17,732 | | | |
| Progressive Conservative hold | | Swing | | −14.38 | |
Source(s) Source: Elections Manitoba

Manitoba provincial by-election, March 22, 2022: Fort Whyte Resignation of Brian Pallister
| Party | Candidate | Votes | % | ±% | Expenditures |
|---|---|---|---|---|---|
| Progressive Conservative | Obby Khan | 3,050 | 42.51 | -14.68 | |
| Liberal | Willard Reaves | 2,853 | 39.77 | +22.53 | |
| New Democratic | Trudy Schroeder | 1,112 | 15.50 | -2.38 | |
| Independent | Patrick Allard | 101 | 1.41 | — | |
| Green | Nicolas Geddert | 55 | 0.77 | -6.00 | |
| Total valid votes | | 7,174 | | | |
| Total rejected ballots | | 15 | 0.21 | -0.33 | |
| Turnout | | 7,189 | 42.62 | -14.57 | |
| Eligible voters | | 15,907 | — | -0.29 | |
| Progressive Conservative hold | | Swing | | -18.61 | |
Source: Elections Manitoba
