= Progressive Conservative Party of Manitoba =

Provincial political party in Canada

- Abbreviation: PC
- Leader: Konrad Narth
- President: Peter Smith
- Deputy Leader: Jeff Bereza
- Founded: 1882; 144 years ago
- Headquarters: 640 - 5 Donald St; Winnipeg, Manitoba; R3L 2T4
- Membership (2025): ▲10,999
- Ideology: Conservatism (Canadian); Economic liberalism
- Political position: Centre-right
- Colours: Blue
- Seats in Legislature: 19 / 57

Website
- www.pcmanitoba.com

The Progressive Conservative Party of Manitoba (PC; French: Parti progressiste-conservateur du Manitoba) is a centre-right political party in Manitoba, Canada. It is currently the opposition party in the Legislative Assembly of Manitoba, following a defeat in the 2023 provincial election.

== History ==
=== Origins and early years ===
The origins of the party lie at the end of the 19th century. Party politics were weak in Manitoba for several years after it entered Canadian Confederation in 1870. The system of government was essentially one of non-partisan democracy, though some leading figures such as Marc-Amable Girard were identified with the Conservatives at the federal level.

Public representation was mostly a matter of communal loyalties—ethnic, religious, and linguistic—and party affiliation was at best a secondary concern.

In the 1870s, Thomas Scott (Orangeman) (not to be confused with a different Thomas Scott), was executed by Louis Riel's provisional government. Joseph Royal attempted to introduce partisan politics into the province. Both were Conservatives, and both believed that they could lead a provincial Conservative Party. Their plans were thwarted by Premier John Norquay, who also supported the Conservatives at the federal level but included both Liberals and Conservatives in his governing alliance.

Norquay himself formed a reluctant alliance with the provincial Conservatives in 1882, in the face of strong opposition from Thomas Greenway's Provincial Rights Party. His government was for all intents and purposes Conservative for the remainder of its time in office, though Norquay continued to describe it as "non-partisan". Starting in the election of 1883, moreover, political parties began to be listed on the provincial election ballot.

=== Subsequent development of the party (1887–1898) ===
When Norquay resigned as Premier in 1887, his successor David H. Harrison also became leader of the Conservative parliamentary caucus. Norquay was able to reclaim the latter position early in 1888, following an extremely divided meeting of senior Conservative politicians. By this time, the new Liberal Premier Thomas Greenway had formally introduced party government to the province, and no one doubted that Norquay was now the province's Conservative leader.

The Conservative Party was not yet a legally-recognized institution in the province, however, and began to lose its coherence again after Norquay's death in 1889. Conservative MLAs simply referred to themselves as "the opposition" for most of the decade that followed. Rodmond Roblin was the dominant Conservative MLA between 1890 and 1892, but he does not seem to have been recognized as an official leader.

After Roblin's defeat in the election of 1892, William Alexander Macdonald became the leader of the opposition. In 1893, his election for Brandon City was declared invalid, and he lost the subsequent by-election. Remarkably, the election of Macdonald's successor, John Andrew Davidson, was also voided in 1894. For the remainder of this parliament, James Fisher seems to have been the leading figure in the opposition ranks. It is not clear if he was formally recognized as "leader of the opposition", or even as an official member of the Conservative Party.

Rodmond Roblin was re-elected in 1896, and officially became opposition leader in the legislature. The next year, Hugh John Macdonald (son of former prime minister John A. Macdonald) became the party's official leader, while Roblin continued to lead the opposition in parliament.

=== Power and loss (1899–1939) ===
==== Taking power (1899–1915) ====
The Conservative Party became an official entity in 1899, and drew up its first election platform in the same year. It promised a board of education for the province, the creation of agricultural and technical colleges, and government ownership of railways.

Hugh John Macdonald became Premier following the 1899 election, but resigned shortly thereafter to re-enter federal politics. Rodmond Roblin succeeded Macdonald, and ruled the province for 15 years. Roblin's government was progressively oriented, negotiated the extension of the railway, bought Manitoba's Bell telephone operations in order to establish a government-run system, introduced corporate taxation, and created a public utilities commission while running a budgetary surplus. It was less progressive on social issues, however, and is most frequently remembered today for its opposition to women's suffrage.

==== In the political wilderness (1915–1930s) ====
The Conservatives were brought down in 1915 by a scandal involving the construction of the province's new legislative buildings. Roblin was forced to resign as Premier, and James Aikins led the party to a disastrous loss later in the year.

The Manitoba Conservatives received their greatest support from the francophone community in the 1915 election, because the party was seen as more supportive than the Liberals of francophone education rights. This was a pronounced contrast to the situation in federal politics, where most francophone Canadians opposed the war policies of Prime Minister Robert Borden.

Aime Benard was chosen as leader pro tem of the party on August 15, 1915, and Albert Prefontaine was chosen as the official parliamentary leader shortly thereafter. The party was a minor force in parliament, however, and was largely sidelined by the radical farmer and labour movements of the late 1910s.

On November 6, 1919, the Conservative Party chose farmer R.G. Willis to lead the party into its next electoral campaign. Willis' selection was a response to the provincial victory of the United Farmers of Ontario the previous month; he defeated Major Fawcett Taylor after three other candidates (including Prefontaine) withdrew their names. The vote total was not announced.

Willis was defeated in the election of 1920, and the Conservatives became the fourth-largest group in parliament with only six seats. John Thomas Haig subsequently became their parliamentary leader, and Fawcett Taylor was chosen as the official party leader in early 1922.

The Conservatives gradually regained support in the following 20 years, but were unable to defeat the Progressive government of John Bracken. In 1932, Bracken's Progressives formed an alliance with the Manitoba Liberal Party to ensure that Taylor would not become the province's Premier.

Taylor resigned as party leader in 1933, and W. Sanford Evans served as parliamentary leader for the next three years. In 1936, Errick Willis (son of R.G.) was acclaimed as party leader. He led the party in another unsuccessful challenge to the Bracken ministry in 1936.

=== 1940s–1975 ===
==== In coalition (1940–1950) ====
In 1940, Willis agreed to join Bracken in a wartime coalition government. Willis himself was given a prominent cabinet position in the all-party ministry which followed.

Three anti-coalition Conservatives were elected to the legislature in 1941. One of these, Huntly Ketchen, served as leader of the opposition. This group did not constitute a rival to the official Conservative Party, however.

In 1946, the party changed its name to the Progressive Conservative Party of Manitoba to reflect the change in name of the federal Progressive Conservatives. Relations between the PCs and Liberal-Progressives deteriorated after Douglas Campbell became Premier in 1948, and the PCs voted 215–7 to leave the coalition in 1950.

==== Varying fortunes (1953–1975) ====
The 1953 election was won by the Liberals, and Willis was compelled to accept a leadership challenge the following year. Duff Roblin, grandson of Rodmond Roblin, became party leader on the second ballot and rebuilt the party's organization which had been weakened during the coalition period.

In 1958, Roblin's PCs ran and were elected to a minority government on a progressive platform of increased education grants, crop insurance, extension of hydro to the north, and road construction. Remarkably, his platform was well to the left of that of Campbell's Liberal-Progressives. In 1959, Roblin returned to the polls and won a majority, which pursued a policy of 'social investment', active government and social reform (including reintroducing French to schools and expanding welfare services). In 1967, Roblin left provincial politics and was replaced by Walter Weir, a member of the party's rural conservative wing. Weir led a somewhat more cautious and restrained government, and was defeated by the New Democratic Party under Edward Schreyer in 1969. Sidney Spivak, a Red Tory like Roblin, led the party from 1971 to 1975, but was unable to defeat Schreyer's government.

=== Sterling Lyon leadership (1975–1981) ===
Sterling Lyon became leader of the party in 1975 and took it in a more economically liberal direction, anticipating the neoliberal economics of Margaret Thatcher, Ronald Reagan, and Mike Harris. The Lyon PCs defeated the NDP in 1977. The Lyon government was to the right of previous PC administrations and implemented a program of spending cuts and reduced taxes (while also promoting mega-projects in the energy sector). Manitobans were unreceptive to the government's economically liberalism, and turned it out of office in 1981 after only one term, bringing the NDP back to power after.

=== Gary Filmon leadership (1983–1999) ===
Gary Filmon became leader of the Progressive Conservatives in 1983, and formed a minority government in 1988 after defeating the NDP. Filmon's PCs remained in power for three terms, winning a majority government in 1990 and again in 1995.

Filmon's government avoided excessive conservative rhetoric, but nonetheless reduced corporate taxes, mandated balanced budgets, and limited the power of teacher's and nurse's unions. It supported the Charlottetown Accord (a proposal for amending the Canadian constitution), as well as free trade with the United States. The party's financial austerity program resulted in a balanced budget in 1995, the first in 20 years.

The PCs were hurt in the late 1990s by increased unemployment, a vote-manipulation scandal from the 1995 election (see Independent Native Voice), and the decline of the Manitoba Liberal Party. The latter development allowed the anti-Tory vote to coalesce around the NDP. Ahead of the 1999 election, Filmon announced that his government would undertake a shift further to the right if reelected. The voters were not receptive to this, and ousted the PCs in favour of the NDP.

=== Post-Filmon (2000s) ===
Filmon resigned as leader in 2000, and was replaced by Stuart Murray. The party fell to twenty seats in the election of 2003, its worst showing since 1953.

On November 5, 2005, at a meeting regarding a possible leadership convention in the near future, Murray received only 45% support from party members. On November 14, Murray stepped down as leader of the party. Hugh McFadyen became leader of the party at the leadership convention on April 29, 2006, garnering two thirds of the first ballot vote.

In McFadyen's first campaign as party leader during the 2007 provincial election, popular support for PC Party rose 2% over 2003 numbers. Although he managed to capture a greater percentage of the provincial vote, the PCs lost one seat.

=== Pallister and Stefanson leaderships (2012–2024) ===
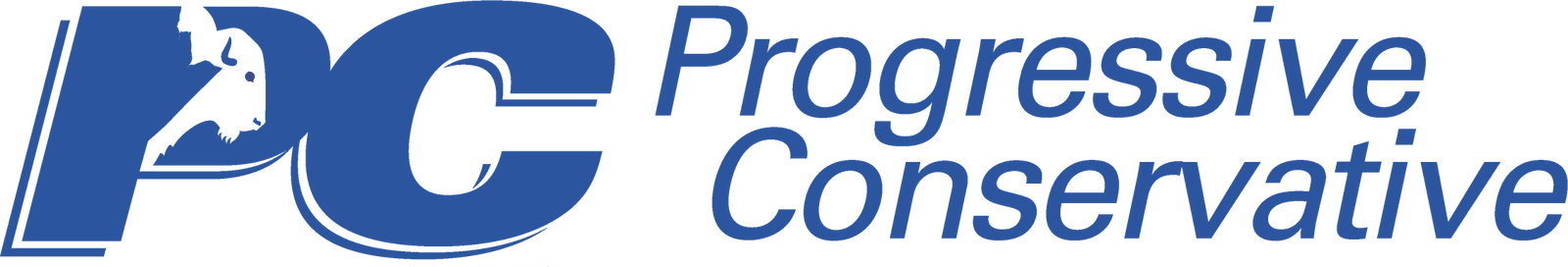
Logo until 2025.

After failing to make major gains in the 2011 provincial election, Hugh McFadyen agreed to step down as leader. On July 30, 2012, former federal MP and Filmon cabinet minister Brian Pallister was acclaimed as leader.

By the time the writs were dropped for the 2016 provincial election, the Manitoba PCs had been leading in opinion polls for almost four years, and were heavily favoured to win. As expected, Pallister led the party to a decisive victory. The PCs won 40 out of 57 seats, the largest majority government in the province's history.

Pallister was re-elected to a majority government in 2019.

Pallister announced his resignation on August 10, 2021, and confirmed on August 29, 2021 his departure would take place on September 1, 2021. His interim successor as party leader was confirmed as Kelvin Goertzen on 31 August, who was sworn in on 1 September, 2021. Heather Stefanson was elected party leader at a leadership election on October 30. Stefanson's election was contentious as she only won 8,405 votes, with Shelly Glover coming in second place with 8,042 votes. At least 1,200 people did not receive their mail-in ballots days before the vote and Glover refused to concede the race, however, party leadership chose to dismiss these grievances stating that "no system is perfect" and that "there is no one who was deliberately disenfranchised in this process." Stefanson would be sworn in as premier on November 2.

A disgruntled libertarian-leaning faction split from the party shortly after the 2021 leadership election, going on to become the Keystone Party of Manitoba.

Stefanson’s succession to the premiership would mark the first female premier in Manitoba history.

The PC government was defeated in the 2023 Manitoba general election. The PCs became the official opposition for the 43rd Manitoba Legislature.

=== Khan leadership (2025–2026) ===
MLA Obby Khan was narrowly elected leader in the 2025 leadership election, defeating businessman Wally Daudrich. Khan became the first Muslim and the first Canadian of South Asian descent to lead the party. Daudrich would attempt to run as the party's candidate in the 2026 The Pas-Kameesak provincial by-election, however, would have his candidacy blocked by party leadership. Daudrich would ultimately leave the party and join the Keystone Party to stand.

In September 2026, Khan faced a confidence vote among the party's 20-member caucus. The vote was held on September 25, with Khan later saying that the result was two-to-one in his favour. Despite the result, divisions within the caucus continued.

On September 28, Khan announced that he would resign as party leader and leave the Progressive Conservative caucus, effective the following day. He said he had learned that some caucus members planned to meet to challenge his continued leadership and that the divisions within the caucus had not been resolved by the confidence vote. Khan said he would remain MLA for Fort Whyte, sitting as an independent.

=== Narth leadership (2026–present) ===
Following Khan's resignation, MLA Konrad Narth was chosen as the Progressive Conservative interim leader. On 21 November 2026, the party executive council unanimously endorsed Narth as permanent leader heading into the 2027 provincial election.

== Leaders of the party ==
Interim party leaders denoted in italics.

- John Norquay, October 1878 – December 1887 (Premier: 1878–1887)
- David Howard Harrison, December 1887 – July 1889 (Premier: 1887–1888)
- Rodmond Roblin, July 1889 – March 1897 (house leader)
- Hugh John Macdonald, March 1897 – October 1900 (Premier: 1900)
- Rodmond Roblin, October 1900 – May 1915 (Premier: 1900–1915)
- Sir James Aikins, May 1915 – January 1916
- Albert Prefontaine, January 1916 – November 6, 1919
- R.G. Willis, November 6, 1919 – April 5, 1922
  - John Thomas Haig led the Manitoba Conservatives in the legislature from 1920 to 1922.
- Fawcett Taylor, April 5, 1922 – April 1933
- W. Sanford Evans, April 1933 – June 1936
- Errick Willis, June 1936 – June 1954
- Dufferin Roblin, June 1954 – November 1967 (Premier: 1958–1967)
- Walter Weir, November 1967 – February 1971 (Premier: 1967–1969)
- Sidney Spivak, February 1971 – December 1975
- Sterling Lyon, December 6, 1975 – December 10, 1983 (Premier: 1977–1981)
- Gary Filmon, December 1983 – May 29, 2000 (Premier: 1988–1999)
- Bonnie Mitchelson, May 29, 2000 – November 4, 2000
- Stuart Murray, November 4, 2000 – April 29, 2006
- Hugh McFadyen, April 29, 2006 – July 30, 2012
- Brian Pallister, July 30, 2012 – September 1, 2021 (Premier: 2016–2021)
- Kelvin Goertzen, September 1, 2021 – October 30, 2021 (Premier: 2021)
- Heather Stefanson, October 30, 2021 – January 15, 2024 (Premier: 2021–2023)
- Wayne Ewasko, January 18, 2024 – April 26, 2025
- Obby Khan, April 26, 2025 – September 28, 2026
- Konrad Narth, September 29, 2026 - present

== Election results ==
Election	Leader	Votes	%	Seats	+/–	Position	Status
1879	John Norquay			13 / 24		1st	Majority^{1}
1883	John Norquay			20 / 30	▲7	1st	Majority
1886	John Norquay			20 / 35	Steady	1st	Majority
1888	David Howard Harrison			4 / 38	▼16	▼2nd	Opposition
1892				9 / 40	▲5	2nd	Opposition
1896				5 / 40	▼4	2nd	Opposition
1899	Hugh John Macdonald			22 / 40	▲17	▲1st	Majority^{2}
1903	Rodmond Roblin		48.98	32 / 40	▲10	1st	Majority
1907	Rodmond Roblin		50.57	28 / 41	▼4	1st	Majority
1910	Rodmond Roblin		50.7	28 / 41	Steady	1st	Majority
1914	Rodmond Roblin		46.9	28 / 49	Steady	1st	Majority
1915	James Albert Manning Aikins		33.0	5 / 47	▼23	▼2nd	Opposition
1920	Richard G. Willis		18.5	8 / 55	▲3	▼4th	Fourth party
1922	Fawcett Taylor		15.5	7 / 55	▼1	▲3rd	Third party
1927	Fawcett Taylor		27.2	15 / 55	▲8	▲2nd	Opposition
1932	Fawcett Taylor		35.4	10 / 55	▼5	2nd	Opposition
1936	Errick Willis		27.8	16 / 55	▲6	2nd	Opposition
1941	Errick Willis		19.9	12 / 55	▼4	2nd	Coalition
1945	Errick Willis		15.9	13 / 55	▲1	2nd	Coalition
1949	Errick Willis		19.1	9 / 57	▼4	2nd	Coalition
1953	Errick Willis	56,278	21.03	12 / 57	▲3	2nd	Opposition
1958	Dufferin Roblin	117,822	40.6	26 / 57	▲14	▲1st	Minority
1959	Dufferin Roblin	147,140	47.0	36 / 57	▲10	1st	Majority
1962	Dufferin Roblin	134,208	45.0	36 / 57	0	1st	Majority
1966	Dufferin Roblin	130,102	39.96	31 / 57	▼5	1st	Majority
1969	Walter Weir	119,021	35.56	22 / 57	▼9	▼2nd	Opposition
1973	Sidney Spivak	171,553	36.73	21 / 57	▼1	2nd	Opposition
1977	Sterling Lyon	237,496	48.75	33 / 57	▲12	▲1st	Majority
1981	Sterling Lyon	211,602	43.82	23 / 57	▼10	▼2nd	Opposition
1986	Gary Filmon	193,728	40.56	26 / 57	▲3	2nd	Opposition
1988	Gary Filmon	206,180	38.37	25 / 57	▼1	▲1st	Minority
1990	Gary Filmon	206,810	41.99	30 / 57	▲5	1st	Majority
1995	Gary Filmon	216,246	42.87	31 / 57	▲1	1st	Majority
1999	Gary Filmon	201,562	40.84	24 / 57	▼7	▼2nd	Opposition
2003	Stuart Murray	142,967	36.19	20 / 57	▼4	2nd	Opposition
2007	Hugh McFadyen	158,511	37.89	19 / 57	▼1	2nd	Opposition
2011	Hugh McFadyen	188,528	43.86	19 / 57	0	2nd	Opposition
2016	Brian Pallister	231,157	53.20	40 / 57	▲21	▲1st	Majority
2019	Brian Pallister	221,007	47.07	36 / 57	▼4	1st	Majority
2023	Heather Stefanson	203,350	41.86	22 / 57	▼13	▼2nd	Opposition

^{1}Includes 7 Liberal-Conservatives
^{2}Includes 3 Liberal-Conservatives

== See also ==
- List of Manitoba general elections
- Progressive Conservative Party of Manitoba candidates in the 1990 Manitoba provincial election
- Progressive Conservative Party of Manitoba leadership elections
