= 2015 New Democratic Party of Manitoba leadership election =

Canadian provincial party leadership election

2015 Manitoba New Democratic Party leadership election
- March 6–8, 2015
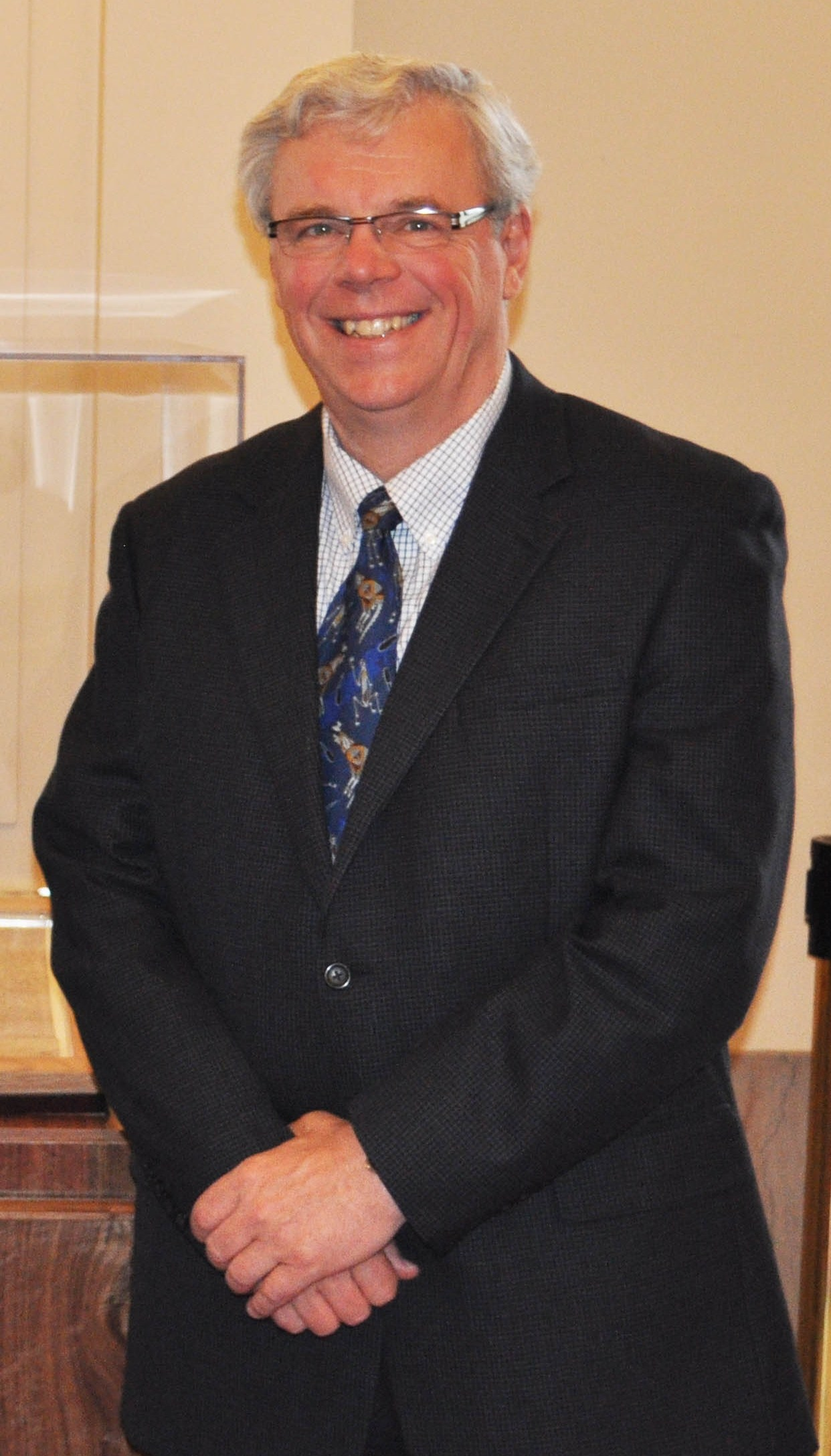
		NDP	NDP
Candidate	Greg Selinger	Theresa Oswald	Steve Ashton
Riding	St. Boniface	Seine River	Thompson
Final ballot	759 (50.93%)	726 (48.72%)	Eliminated
First ballot	612 (36.02%)	575 (33.84%)	502 (29.54%)
Leader before election
Greg Selinger
Elected Leader
Greg Selinger

2015 New Democratic Party of Manitoba leadership election
- Date: March 6–8, 2015
- Convention: Canad Inns Polo Park; Winnipeg, Manitoba
- Resigning leader: Greg Selinger
- Won by: Greg Selinger
- Ballots: 2
- Candidates: 3
- Entrance fee: $2,000
- Spending limit: $71,945.55

The New Democratic Party of Manitoba leadership election of 2015 was called at the request of Premier Greg Selinger following the resignation of five members of his cabinet in protest of his leadership of the New Democratic Party of Manitoba. Selinger ran in the election, facing two challengers, but prevailed on the second ballot.

== Rules ==
Candidates must pay an entry fee of $2,000 and submit a nomination form signed by at least 50 members of the party. The election is being conducted as a traditional delegated leadership convention with delegates being selected by each electoral district and affiliated trade union who will then attend the convention and vote in ballots until one candidate wins 50% + 1 of the vote. Union delegates are required to be members of the NDP and be a member of the local they represent.

== Delegates ==
There are approximately 2,217 delegate spots. Manitoba's 57 NDP constituency associations may send up to 1,242 delegates chosen at constituency meetings. Trade unions are entitled to send up to 691 delegates. Another 200 delegates are automatic delegates, two each from each riding association with the rest being NDP MLAs, Members of Parliament and other party dignitaries.

Union affiliates were having difficulty finding enough delegates to fill their delegations and were reportedly only able to fill 361 of 691 positions. Unions were allotted one delegate for every 100 members of the union. Each delegate must be a member of the NDP and of the local they were representing.

== Timeline ==
- April 2013 – Selinger's government increases the provincial sales tax by 1%, a move which leads to a precipitous decline in popular support for the government.
- October 2013 – Due, in part, to the unpopularity of the tax increase, the NDP runs behind the Opposition Progressive Conservatives in public opinion polls; Selinger attempts to turn around the party's fortunes by shuffling his cabinet and promising to use increased tax revenues exclusively for infrastructure projects.
- September 2014 – During a caucus retreat several MLAs openly tell Selinger he needs to resign if the party is to have a chance of winning the next provincial election. Selinger refuses.
- October 27–28, 2014 – Five senior cabinet ministers and several senior party officials go public with their call for Selinger's resignation.
- November 3, 2014 – The five ministers resign from cabinet due to their opposition to Selinger's leadership; they are Jennifer Howard, (Fort Rouge), minister of finance, Stan Struthers, (Dauphin), minister of municipal government, Theresa Oswald, (Seine River), minister for jobs and the economy, Andrew Swan, (Minto), minister of justice and Erin Selby, (Southdale), minister of health.
- November 9, 2014 – Selinger asks the party executive to hold a leadership election during the party's annual convention scheduled for March 6–8, 2015 and states his intention to be a candidate.
- November 15, 2014 – Party executive agrees to hold a leadership election on March 6, 2015, during the party's annual convention.
- November 18, 2014 – Special Committee led by party president Ellen Olfert is struck to draw up recommendations for rules governing the leadership election.
- November 29, 2014 – Special Committee reports back to party executive with recommendations. Party executive announces that there is nothing in the party's constitution, the Elections Act or the Elections Financing Act that would require Selinger to step down during the leadership campaign. Party executive approves the Special Committee's recommendations and refers them to Provincial Council.
- December 6, 2014 – Special Committee recommendations brought to Provincial Council and approved. Motion to formally request that Selinger step down as Premier during the leadership campaign is defeated.
- December 15, 2014 – Nominations opens, campaign period begins.
- December 21, 2014 – former cabinet minister Theresa Oswald announces her candidacy.
- December 22, 2014 – Minister of Infrastructure and Transportation Steve Ashton resigns from cabinet and states he will make an announcement about entering the leadership contest the next day.
- January 6, 2015 – Nomination period closes. Last day an individual can take membership in the party and be eligible to vote in the election.
- February 6–25, 2015 – Delegate selection meetings held by the party's 57 local constituency associations.
- March 6–8, 2015 – Leadership convention.
  - March 8, 2015 – Leadership vote conducted, Selinger wins on the second ballot.

== Declared candidates ==
=== Steve Ashton ===
Background

MLA for Thompson (1981–2016), Minister of Infrastructure and Transportation (2009–2014), Minister of Intergovernmental Affairs (2006–2009), Minister of Water Stewardship (2003–2006), Minister of Labour and Immigration (2003), Minister of Conservation (2002–2003), Minister of Transportation and Government Services (2001–2002), Minister of Highways and Government Services (1999–2001). Runner-up in the 2009 leadership election.

Date candidacy declared: December 23, 2014
Supporters
Support from caucus members: Jim Rondeau (Assiniboia), former cabinet minister (2003–2013); Dave Gaudreau (St. Norbert); Tom Nevakshonoff (Interlake); Jim Maloway (Elmwood); Bidhu Jha (Radisson); Christine Melnick (Riel)
Support from federal caucus members:
Support from former provincial caucus members:
Support from affiliates: United Fire Fighters of Winnipeg, United Steel Workers of America
Other prominent supporters:
Policies: Ashton is promising to hold a referendum on the government's previous increase in the provincial sales tax Says campaign based on four fundamentals: reconnecting the government with Manitobans, rebuilding the NDP, respecting social democratic principles and refocusing government policies and programs on serving Manitobans throughout the province.
Campaign website: steveforleader.ca

=== Theresa Oswald ===
Background

MLA for Seine River (2003–2016), Minister of Jobs and the Economy (2013–2014), Minister of Health (2006–2013), Minister of Healthy Living (2004–2006)

Date candidacy declared: December 21, 2014
Supporters
Support from caucus members: Tourism minister Ron Lemieux (Dawson Trail); Nancy Allan (St. Vital), former education minister; Jennifer Howard (Fort Rouge), former minister of finance; Stan Struthers (Dauphin), former minister of municipal government; Andrew Swan (Minto), former minister of justice; Erin Selby (Southdale), former minister of health; Clarence Pettersen (Flin Flon)
Support from federal caucus members:
Support from former provincial caucus members: Eugene Kostyra, MLA for Seven Oaks (1981–1987), former finance minister
Support from affiliates: International Brotherhood of Electrical Workers (IBEW) Local 2085
Other prominent supporters: Michael Balagus, former chief of staff to premiers Gary Doer and Selinger; Alissa Brandt, director of the premier's secretariat under Selinger; Brandon city councillors Jan Chaboyer and Lonnie Patterson; Anna Rothney, secretary of the planning and priorities committee of cabinet in the Selinger government; former NDP presidents Lorraine Sigurdson and Carmen Neufeld
Policies:
Campaign website: theresaformanitoba.ca

=== Greg Selinger ===
Background

MLA for St. Boniface (1999–2018), Premier of Manitoba and party leader (2009–2016), Minister of Finance (1999–2009).

Date candidacy declared: January 2, 2015
Supporters
Support from caucus members: James Allum, Minister of Justice and Attorney General; Peter Bjornson, Minister of Education and Advanced Learning; Sharon Blady, Minister of Health; Drew Caldwell, Minister of Municipal Government; Kevin Chief, Minister of Children and Youth Opportunities; Deanne Crothers, Minister of Healthy Living and Seniors; Greg Dewar, Minister of Finance; Eric Robinson, Deputy Premier; Mohinder Saran (The Maples); Melanie Wight, Minister of Children and Youth Opportunities; Kerri Irvin-Ross, Minister of Family Services; Flor Marcelino, Minister of Multiculturalism and Literacy; Ted Marcelino (Tyndall Park); Ron Kostyshyn, Minister of Agriculture, Food and Rural Development and Infrastructure and Transportation
Support from federal caucus members: Federal NDP leader Thomas Mulcair
Support from former provincial caucus members:
Support from affiliates: CUPE Manitoba, UFCW Local 0832
Other prominent supporters:
Policies:
Campaign website: gregselinger2015.ca

== Declined ==
- Kevin Chief, (MLA for Point Douglas 2011–2017), Minister of Children and Youth Opportunities (2012–2014)

== Delegate selection meetings ==
Riding	Date	Winner	Delegates	Caucus Member (Supporting)
Assiniboia	Feb. 6	Ashton	9	RONDEAU, Jim (Ashton)
Kirkfield Park	Feb. 6	Oswald	9	BLADY, Sharon (Selinger)
Emerson	Feb. 6	Ashton	5	
Elmwood	Feb. 7	Ashton	61	MALOWAY, Jim (Ashton)
Riel	Feb. 7	Oswald	17	MELNICK, Christine (Ashton)
Southdale	Feb. 7	Oswald	16	SELBY, Erin (Oswald)
St. Vital	Feb. 7	Oswald	15	ALLAN, Nancy (Oswald)
Seine River	Feb. 7	Oswald	15	OSWALD, Theresa (Oswald)
Rossmere	Feb. 7	Ashton	30	BRAUN, Erna
Minto	Feb. 8	Oswald	19	SWAN, Andrew (Oswald)
St. James	Feb. 8	Oswald	13	CROTHERS, Deanne (Selinger)
Point Douglas	Feb. 8	Selinger	34	CHIEF, Kevin (Selinger)
Interlake	Feb. 9	Ashton	14	NEVAKSHONOFF, Thomas (Ashton)
Morden-Winkler	Feb. 9	Ashton	5	
Charleswood	Feb. 10	Oswald	6	
Tuxedo	Feb. 10	Ashton	13	
Gimli	Feb. 10	Selinger	15	BJORNSON, Peter (Selinger)
Lakeside	Feb. 10	Oswald	5	
Arthur-Virden	Feb. 11	Selinger & Oswald (tie)	6	
Spruce Woods	Feb. 11	Oswald	5	
Dawson Trail	Feb. 11	Oswald	6	LEMIEUX, Ron (Oswald)
Steinbach	Feb. 11	Ashton	5	
La Verendrye	Feb. 11	Oswald	5	
Fort Richmond	Feb. 12	Ashton	18	IRVIN-ROSS, Kerri (Selinger)
Kildonan	Feb. 12	Selinger	21	CHOMIAK, Dave
Brandon East	Feb. 13	Selinger	13	CALDWELL, Drew (Selinger)
Brandon West	Feb. 13	Selinger	9	
St. Johns	Feb. 13	Selinger	20	MACKINTOSH, Gord
Logan	Feb. 14	Selinger	28	MARCELINO, Florfina (Selinger)
Radisson	Feb. 14	Ashton	18	JHA, Bidhu (Ashton)
Transcona	Feb. 14	Oswald	22	REID, Daryl (Neutral)
The Maples	Feb. 15	Selinger	117	SARAN, Mohinder (Selinger)
Wolseley	Feb. 15	Oswald	48	ALTEMEYER, Rob
Dauphin	Feb. 17	Oswald	17	STRUTHERS, Stan (Oswald)
Riding Mountain	Feb. 17	Selinger	5	
Agassiz	Feb. 18	Oswald	5	
Portage la Prairie	Feb. 18	Oswald	5	
Fort Whyte	Feb. 19	Ashton	25	
Selkirk	Feb. 19	Selinger	11	DEWAR, Greg (Selinger)
Fort Garry-Riverview	Feb. 20	Selinger	25	ALLUM, James (Selinger)
River East	Feb. 20	Selinger	11	
St. Paul	Feb. 20	Ashton	10	
Burrows	Feb. 21	Selinger	27	WIGHT, Melanie (Selinger)
Tyndall Park	Feb. 21	Selinger	25	MARCELINO, Ted (Selinger)
Concordia	Feb. 21	Ashton	46	WIEBE, Matt (Neutral)
Fort Rouge	Feb. 22	Oswald	23	HOWARD, Jennifer (Oswald)
River Heights	Feb. 22	Oswald	16	
St. Norbert	Feb. 22	Ashton	44	GAUDREAU, Dave (Ashton)
Lac du Bonnet	Feb. 23	Oswald	6	
Morris	Feb. 23	Oswald	6	
Midland	Feb. 24	Selinger	14	
St. Boniface	Feb. 25	Selinger	23	SELINGER, Gregory F. (Selinger)
Flin Flon	Mail-in	Oswald	22	PETTERSEN, Clarence (Oswald)
Kewatinook	Mail-in	Selinger	5	ROBINSON, Eric (Selinger)
Swan River	Mail-in	Selinger	22	KOSTYSHYN, Ron (Selinger)
The Pas	Mail-in	Ashton	145	
Thompson	Mail-in	Ashton	61	ASHTON, Steve (Ashton)
Young New Democrats	Mail-in	Oswald	92	

== Results ==
=== First ballot ===
Candidate	Votes	%
Greg Selinger	612	36.02
Theresa Oswald	575	33.84
Steve Ashton	502	29.54
Total Valid Votes	1,699	100.00

Ashton eliminated. Releases his delegates, did not publicly endorse another candidate

=== Second ballot ===
Candidate	Votes	%
Greg Selinger	759	50.93
Theresa Oswald	726	48.72
Total Valid Votes	1,490	100.00
