= Minister of Mineral Resources =

Minister of Mineral Resources may refer to:

- Minister of Mineral Resources (Manitoba)
- Minister of Mineral Resources (South Africa)

== See also ==
- Ministry of Minerals and Energy (Botswana)
- Ministry of Mineral Resources (Sierra Leone)
