= Minister responsible for Seniors (Manitoba) =

Since 1988, the Executive Council of Manitoba has included a minister responsible for Seniors. The position is not a full cabinet portfolio.

The current Minister responsible for Seniors is Kerri Irvin-Ross.

== List of ministers responsible for Seniors ==
Name	Party	Took office	Left office
Harold Neufeld	Progressive Conservative	May 9, 1988	April 21, 1989
Jim Downey	Progressive Conservative	April 21, 1989	February 5, 1991
Gerald Ducharme	Progressive Conservative	February 5, 1991	March 20, 1995
Diane McGifford	New Democratic Party	October 5, 1999	November 4, 2003
Jim Rondeau	New Democratic Party	November 4, 2003	October 12, 2004
Theresa Oswald	New Democratic Party	October 12, 2004	September 21, 2006
Kerri Irvin-Ross	New Democratic Party	September 21, 2006	November 3, 2009

Source: Legislative Assembly of Manitoba
