= Healthy Child Manitoba =

Healthy Child Manitoba is an interdepartmental committee within the Executive Council of Manitoba that deals with policies, programs, and services related to the well-being of children and youth in Manitoba.

The Healthy Child Committee of Cabinet is composed of six ministers:

- Education and Early Childhood Learning
- Families
- Health, Seniors and Long Term Care
- Indigenous and Municipal Relations
- Justice
- Sport, Culture and Heritage

== List of ministers responsible for Healthy Child Manitoba ==
From 2003 to 2012, the Executive Council of Manitoba has included a minister responsible for Healthy Child Manitoba, a position that is not a full cabinet portfolio.

Name	Party	Took office	Left office
Jim Rondeau	New Democratic Party	November 4, 2003	October 12, 2004
Theresa Oswald	New Democratic Party	October 12, 2004	September 21, 2006
Kerri Irvin-Ross	New Democratic Party	September 21, 2006	November 3, 2009
Jim Rondeau	New Democratic Party	November 3, 2009	January 13, 2012

== See also ==
- Roots of Empathy
