= Tim Sale =

Tim Sale may refer to:

- Tim Sale (artist) (1956–2022), comic book artist
- Tim Sale (politician) (born 1942), Canadian politician
