= Lagimodière =

Provincial electoral district in Manitoba, Canada

Manitoba electoral district
- Location in Winnipeg

Provincial electoral district
- Legislature: Legislative Assembly of Manitoba
MLA
Tyler Blashko
New Democratic
- District created: 2018
- First contested: 2019
- Last contested: 2023

Demographics
- Population (2016): 21,215
- Census division: Division No. 11
- Census subdivision: Winnipeg

Lagimodière is a provincial electoral district of Manitoba, Canada, that came into effect at the 2019 Manitoba general election. It elects one member to the Legislative Assembly of Manitoba.

The riding was created by the 2018 provincial redistribution out of part of Southdale and small parts of Radisson, St. Vital, and Seine River.

The riding contains the Winnipeg neighbourhoods of Royalwood, Island Lakes, Bonavista, and Sage Creek.

The riding is named for Winnipeg Route 20 (locally called Lagimodière Boulevard), which bifurcates the riding.

== Members of the Legislative Assembly ==
Assembly	Years	Member	Party
42nd	2019–2023	Andrew Smith	Progressive Conservative
43rd	2023–present	Tyler Blashko	New Democratic

== Election results ==
2023 Manitoba general election
Party	Candidate	Votes	%	±%	Expenditures
New Democratic	Tyler Blashko	5,711	46.24	+18.37	$29,394.93
Progressive Conservative	Andrew Smith	5,599	45.33	-6.45	$41,864.78
Liberal	Walt Nilsson	1,041	8.43	-6.36	$304.63
Total valid votes/expense limit		12,351	99.56	–	$75,746.00
Total rejected and declined ballots		54	0.44	–	
Turnout		12,405	64.05	+1.78	
Eligible voters		19,367			
New Democratic gain from Progressive Conservative		Swing		+12.41	
Source(s) Source: Elections Manitoba

2019 Manitoba general election
Party	Candidate	Votes	%	±%	Expenditures
Progressive Conservative	Andrew Smith	5,187	51.78	-12.1	$22,483.72
New Democratic	Billie Cross	2,792	27.87	+5.8	$11,981.93
Liberal	Jake Sacher	1,481	14.78	+0.9	$5,080.09
Green	Bob Krul	557	5.56	+5.4	$0.00
Total valid votes		10,017	99.47		
Total rejected ballots		53	0.53		
Turnout		10,070	62.27		
Eligible voters		16,172			
Progressive Conservative hold		Swing		-9.0	

2016 provincial election redistributed results
Party	%
Progressive Conservative	63.8
New Democratic	22.0
Liberal	13.9
Green	0.2

== See also ==
- List of Manitoba provincial electoral districts
- Canadian provincial electoral districts
