= New Democratic Party of Manitoba candidates in the 2007 Manitoba provincial election =

2007 provincial election candidates

The New Democratic Party of Manitoba fielded a full slate of 57 candidates in the 2007 Manitoba provincial election, and won 36 seats to form a third consecutive majority government. Many of the party's candidates have their own biography pages; information about others may be found here.

== Candidates ==
=== Arthur-Virden: Bob Senff ===
Senff was born in Winnipeg in 1947, and holds a Bachelor of Arts degree and a Certificate in Education. He began teaching high-school English at Virden Collegiate in 1970, and remained in the position for 36 years. He also served as chair of the Virden Inter-denominational Refugee Committee, is involved in high school and community theatre, and received a certificate of merit from the Government of Canada in 1988 for his involvement in the arts community.

He campaigned for the federal New Democratic Party in the 2006 Canadian general election, and for the provincial party in the 2007 election. he also substitute's at Christian Heritage School in brandon, MB

Electoral record
| Election | Division | Party | Votes | % | Place | Winner |
|---|---|---|---|---|---|---|
| 2006 federal | Brandon—Souris | New Democratic Party | 7,528 | 20.24 | 2/7 | Merv Tweed, Conservative |
| 2007 provincial | Arthur-Virden | New Democratic Party | 2,141 | 30.81 | 2/3 | Larry Maguire, Progressive Conservative |

=== Fort Whyte: Sunny Dhaliwal ===
Dhaliwal has a certificate in Business Administration from Red River College, Bachelor of Science and Master of Science degrees from Guru Nanak Dev University in India, and a Bachelor of Education degree with distinction from the University of Manitoba. At the time of the election, was seeking a Post-Baccalaureate Diploma from the University of Manitoba. He is a high-school teacher and a volunteer with the Able Enrichment Centre, which provides education and settlement assistance to immigrants. He received 3,895 votes (33.83%), finishing second against Progressive Conservative leader Hugh McFadyen.

=== Minnedosa: Harvey Paterson ===
Harvey Paterson was born and raised on a family farm south of Kenton, and farmed near Forrest at the time of the 2007 election. He worked for 25 years in law enforcement, serving on the Brandon Police Service and as Sheriff's Officer in the Brandon Courthouse. He was elected as a councillor for the Rural Municipality of Elton in 2002, and was re-elected without opposition in 2006. He has also served as a Minnedosa regional councillor. Paterson has been a candidate for the provincial New Democratic Party on three occasions. He came very close to winning in 2003, losing by only 12 votes on a judicial recount. He called for the promotion of ethanol and bio-fuels in the 2007 campaign.

He should not be confused with Harvey Patterson, a New Democratic Party member of the Legislative Assembly of Manitoba from 1973 to 1975.

Electoral record
| Election | Division | Party | Votes | % | Place | Winner |
|---|---|---|---|---|---|---|
| 1999 provincial | Minnedosa | New Democratic Party | 2,841 | 37.72 | 2/4 | Harold Gilleshammer, Progressive Conservative |
| 2002 municipal | Elton, Councillor, Ward 3 | n/a | 66 | 55.93 | 1/2 | himself |
| 2003 provincial | Minnedosa | New Democratic Party | 3,247 | 47.19 | 2/4 | Leanne Rowat, Progressive Conservative |
| 2006 municipal | Elton, Councillor, Ward 3 | n/a | acclaimed | n/a | 1/1 | himself |
| 2007 provincial | Minnedosa | New Democratic Party | 2,769 | 38.57 | 2/5 | Leanne Rowat, Progressive Conservative |

=== River Heights: Fiona Shiells ===
Shiells holds an Honours Bachelor of Arts degree in political science from the University of Winnipeg. At the time of the election, she was an employee of Manitoba Water Stewardship and a graduate student in Political Science at the University of Manitoba. She received 1,843 votes (19.77%), finishing third against Manitoba Liberal Party leader Jon Gerrard.
