= Peter Bjornson =

Canadian politician

Louis Riel School Division Trustee for Ward 3
- Incumbent
- Assumed office October 25, 2025

Minister of Education and Advanced Learning
- In office November 3, 2014 – April 29, 2015
- Premier: Greg Selinger
- Preceded by: James Allum
- Succeeded by: James Allum

Manitoba Minister of Housing and Community Development
- In office October 18, 2013 – November 3, 2014
- Premier: Greg Selinger
- Preceded by: Kerri Irvin-Ross
- Succeeded by: Kerri Irvin-Ross

Minister of Entrepreneurship, Training and Trade
- In office November 3, 2009 – October 18, 2013
- Premier: Greg Selinger
- Preceded by: Andrew Swan
- Succeeded by: Theresa Oswald

Minister of Education, Citizenship and Youth
- In office November 4, 2003 – November 3, 2009
- Premier: Gary Doer; Greg Selinger
- Preceded by: Ron Lemieux
- Succeeded by: Nancy Allan

Member of the Legislative Assembly of Manitoba for Gimli
- In office June 3, 2003 – August 7, 2015
- Preceded by: Ed Helwer
- Succeeded by: Jeff Wharton

Town Councillor Gimli
- In office 1988–2002

Personal details
- Born: February 25, 1964 (age 62)
- Party: New Democratic Party

Peter Bjornson is a politician in Manitoba, Canada. He was a cabinet minister in the NDP government of Premier Greg Selinger.

== Career ==
Bjornson has lived for his entire life in the community of Gimli, Manitoba. He worked as a teacher before entering politics, and has extensive experience in local community service. Bjornson received a Governor General's Award for excellence in teaching Canadian history in 2000, and a Prime Minister's Medal in 2001. He also served as a town councillor in Gimli between 1988 and 2002.

Bjornson was one of the new MLAs in the New Democratic Party caucus following the party's provincial election victory in 2003. He was elected in the riding of Gimli, which had been won by the Progressive Conservatives in the election of 1999. With the incumbent MLA retiring, Bjornson defeated Tory candidate by 5,500 votes to 3,651.

After the election, Bjornson was appointed as Manitoba's Minister of Education, Citizenship and Youth. In November 2009, he became Minister of Entrepreneurship, Training and Trade under Premier Selinger.

He was re-elected in the 2007 and 2011 provincial elections.

Political offices
| Preceded by Kerri Irvin-Ross | Manitoba Minister of Housing and Community Development; October 18, 2013 – present | Incumbent |
| Preceded by Andrew Swan as Manitoba Minister of Competitiveness, Training and Trade | Manitoba Minister of Entrepreneurship, Training and Trade; November 3, 2009 – October 18, 2013 | Succeeded by Theresa Oswald as Manitoba Minister of Jobs and the Economy |
| Preceded by Ron Lemieux as Manitoba Minister of Education and Youth | Manitoba Minister of Education, Citizenship and Youth; November 4, 2003 – November 3, 2009 | Succeeded by Nancy Allan as Manitoba Minister of Education |
| Preceded by Ron Lemieux as Manitoba Minister of Education and Youth | Manitoba Minister of Education, Citizenship and Youth; November 4, 2003 – November 3, 2009 | Succeeded by Jim Rondeau as Manitoba Minister of Healthy Living, Youth and Seniors |
Legislative Assembly of Manitoba
| Preceded by Ed Helwer | Member of the Legislative Assembly for Gimli; June 3, 2003 –August 7, 2015 | Succeeded by Jeff Wharton |
