= 2007 Manitoba general election =

- May 22, 2007

57 seats of the Legislative Assembly of Manitoba 29 seats were needed for a majority
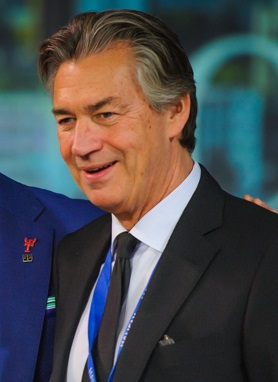

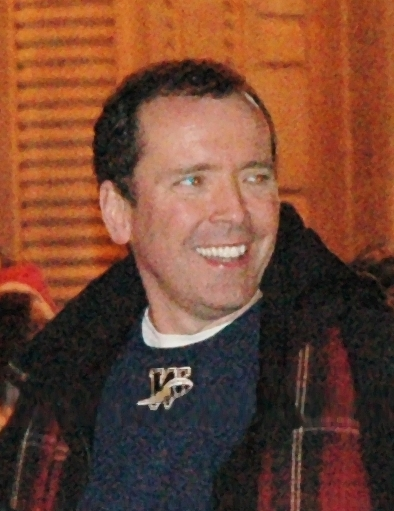

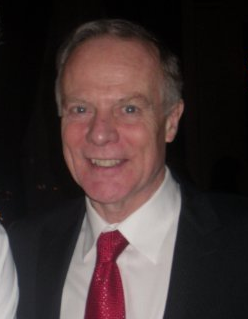
	First party	Second party	Third party
Leader	Gary Doer	Hugh McFadyen	Jon Gerrard
Party	New Democratic	Progressive Conservative	Liberal
Leader since	March 30, 1988	April 29, 2006	October 17, 1998
Leader's seat	Concordia	Fort Whyte	River Heights
Last election	35	20	2
Seats won	36	19	2
Seat change	▲1	▼1	0
Popular vote	200,834	158,511	51,857
Percentage	48.00%	37.89%	12.39%
Swing	▼1.47%	▲1.70%	▼0.80%
- Popular vote by riding. As this is an FPTP election, seat totals are not determined by popular vote, but instead via results by each riding. Click the map for more details.
Premier before election
Gary Doer
New Democratic
Premier after election
Gary Doer
New Democratic

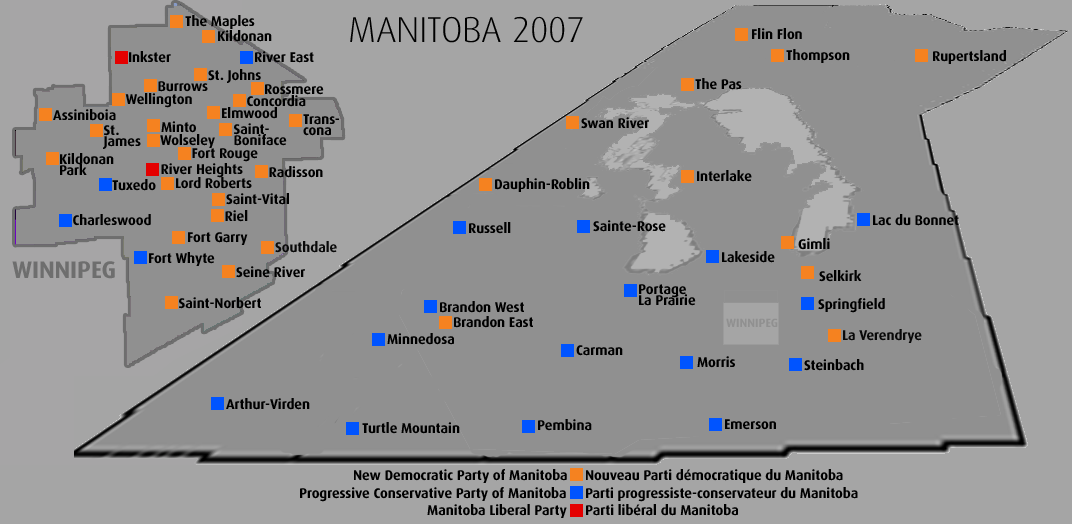
Riding-by-riding results

The 2007 Manitoba general election was held on May 22, 2007 to elect Members of the Legislative Assembly of the Province of Manitoba, Canada. It was won by the New Democratic Party, which won 36 seats out of 57. The Progressive Conservative Party finished second with nineteen seats. The Liberal Party won two seats. As a result, Premier of Manitoba Gary Doer received a mandate to form a third consecutive majority government, becoming the first Premier of Manitoba to achieve this since Duff Roblin in 1966.

The election resulted in very few changes from the party standings at the dissolution of the previous legislature. One New Democrat incumbent was defeated by a Progressive Conservative challenger, and one Progressive Conservative incumbent was defeated by a New Democrat. The PCs picked up one seat that was previously held by an independent, and the NDP picked up one seat that was vacant at dissolution. The other 53 seats in the legislature were all retained by their incumbent parties. The popular vote was also very similar, with the New Democrats dropping 1.47% and the Progressive Conservatives gaining 1.70% overall.

== Results ==
Summary of the May 22, 2007 Manitoba Legislature election results
Party	Party leader	Candidates	Seats				Popular vote		
Party	Party leader	Candidates	2003	Dissol.	2007	+/—	#	%	Change
New Democratic	Gary Doer	57	35	35	36	+1	200,834	48.00%	–1.47%
Progressive Conservative	Hugh McFadyen	56	20	18	19	–1	158,511	37.89%	+1.70%
Liberal	Jon Gerrard	57	2	2	2	0	51,857	12.39%	–0.80%
Green	Andrew Basham	15	0	0	0	—	5,586	1.34%	+0.38%
Communist	Darrell Rankin	6	0	0	0	—	367	0.09%	+0.01%
Independents and no affiliation		5	0	1	0	—	1,235	0.30%	+0.26%
Vacant				1					
Total		196	57	57	57	—	420,540	56.75%	
Registered Voters							740,991		

=== Vote and seat summaries ===
Ternary plots – shift of electoral support (2003–2007)
2003

2007
Electoral districts identified by colours of winning parties

Popular vote
New Democratic	48.00%
PC	37.89%
Liberal	12.39%
Others	1.72%

Seats summary
New Democratic	63.16%
PC	33.33%
Liberal	3.51%

=== Results by riding ===
==== Northern Manitoba/Parkland ====
Electoral district	Candidates					Incumbent
Electoral district	NDP	PC	Liberal	Green	Other	Incumbent
Dauphin-Roblin	Stan Struthers; 4,214 (53.50%)	Lloyd McKinney; 3,257 (41.35%)	Yarko Petryshyn; 385 (4.89%)			Stan Struthers
Flin Flon	Gerard Jennissen; 2,255 (76.73%)		Gary Zamzow; 651 (22.08%)			Gerrard Jennissen
Rupertsland	Eric Robinson; 2,092 (58.21%)	David Harper; 1,285 (35.75%)	Earl Fontaine; 202 (5.62%)			Eric Robinson
Swan River	Rosann Wowchuk; 4,522 (58.18%)	Maxine Plesiuk; 2,915 (37.51%)	Niomi Spence-Pranteau; 306 (3.93%)			Rosann Wowchuk
The Pas	Oscar Lathlin; 3,262 (68.30%)	George Muswaggon; 1,016 (21.27%)	James Houston; 459 (9.61%)			Oscar Lathlin
Thompson	Steve Ashton; 3,036 (73.44%)	Cory Phillips; 416 (10.06%)	Kenny Braun; 651 (15.89%)			Steve Ashton
Totals	NDP; 19,381 (62.67%)	PC; 8,889 (28.74%)	Liberal; 2,654 (8.58%)			

==== Westman ====
Electoral district	Candidates					Incumbent
Electoral district	NDP	PC	Liberal	Green	Other	Incumbent
Arthur-Virden	Bob Senff; 2,141 (30.81%)	Larry Maguire; 4,451 (64.05%)	Fred Curry; 357 (5.14%)			Larry Maguire
Brandon East	Drew Caldwell; 3,760 (53.95%)	Mike Waddell; 2,655 (38.10%)	Cheryl Burke; 554 (7.95%)			Drew Caldwell
Brandon West	Scott Smith; 4,674 (47.48%)	Rick Borotsik; 4,730 (48.04%)	M.J. Willard; 398 (4.04%)		Lisa Gallagher (Communist); 43 (0.44%)	Scott Smith
Minnedosa	Harvey Paterson; 2,769 (38.44%)	Leanne Rowat; 3,790 (52.62%)	Christopher Baker; 268 (3.72%)	James Beddome; 281 (3.90%)	Colin Atkins (Ind); 72 (1.00%)	Leanne Rowat
Russell	Teri Nicholson; 2,375 (33.45%)	Len Derkach; 4,141 (58.32%)	Clarice Wilson; 564 (7.94%)			Len Derkach
Totals	NDP; 15,719 (41.34%)	PC; 19,767 (51.99%)	Liberal; 2,141 (5.60%)	Green; 281 (0.74%)	Other; 115 (0.30%)	

==== Central Manitoba ====
Electoral district	Candidates					Incumbent
Electoral district	NDP	PC	Liberal	Green	Other	Incumbent
Carman	Sharon Sadowy; 1,440 (21.71%)	Blaine Pedersen; 3,845 (57.96%)	Don Oldcorn; 1,293 (19.49%)			Denis Rocan†
Gimli	Peter Bjornson; 5,946 (58.43%)	Chris Bourgeois; 3,450 (33.90%)	Lynn Greenberg; 727 (7.14%)			Peter Bjornson
Interlake	Tom Nevakshonoff; 4,047 (59.30%)	Garry Wasylowski; 2,445 (35.82%)	Franklin Swark; 309 (4.53%)			Tom Nevakshonoff
Lakeside	Mitch Obach; 2,631 (33.08%)	Ralph Eichler; 4,448 (55.93%)	Ian Band; 488 (6.14%)	David Michael Carey; 349 (4.39%)		Ralph Eichler
Morris	Kevin Stevenson; 2,517 (32.31%)	Mavis Taillieu; 4,404 (56.53%)	Michael Sherby; 808 (10.37%)			Mavis Taillieu
Pembina	Lisa Moore; 960 (14.25%)	Peter Dyck; 5,192 (77.06%)	Ralph Gowan; 570 (8.46%)			Peter Dyck
Portage la Prairie	James Kostuchuk; 2,935 (42.23%)	David Faurschou; 3,344 (48.16%)	Marvin Krawec; 643 (9.25%)			David Faurschou
Selkirk	Greg Dewar; 4,584 (55.26%)	Gordie Dehn; 2,951 (35.57%)	Karen Keppler; 704 (8.49%)			Greg Dewar
Ste. Rose	Denise Harder; 2,022 (33.08%)	Stu Briese; 3,599 (58.89%)	Janelle Mailhot; 465 (7.61%)			Glen Cummings†
Turtle Mountain	Faron Douglas; 1,476 (22.45%)	Cliff Cullen; 4,318 (65.67%)	Allen Hunter; 739 (11.24%)			Cliff Cullen
Totals	NDP; 28,558 (38.64%)	PC; 37,996 (51.40%)	Liberal; 6,746 (9.12%)	Green; 617 (0.83%)		

==== Eastman ====
Electoral district	Candidates					Incumbent
Electoral district	NDP	PC	Liberal	Green	Other	Incumbent
Emerson	Chris Murash; 1,296 (21.23%)	Cliff Graydon; 3,636 (59.56%)	Monica Guetre; 1,117 (18.30%)			Jack Penner†
Lac du Bonnet	Patrick O'Connor; 2,773 (33.51%)	Gerald Hawranik; 4,855 (58.81%)	Christopher Gmiterek; 607 (7.33%)			Gerald Hawranik
La Verendrye	Ron Lemieux; 4,018 (51.12%)	Bob Stefaniuk; 2,973 (37.82%)	Roland Chaput; 490 (6.23%)		Jay Murray (Ind); 379 (4.82%)	Ron Lemieux
Springfield	Ernest Muswagon; 2,656 (29.91%)	Ron Schuler; 5,165 (58.16%)	James Johnston; 1,014 (11.42%)			Ron Schuler
Steinbach	Rawle Squires; 641 (8.66%)	Kelvin Goertzen; 6,143 (82.98%)	John Thiessen; 350 (4.74%)	Janine Gibson; 268 (3.62%)		Kelvin Goertzen
Totals	NDP; 11,384 (30.05%)	PC; 22,272 (58.79%)	Liberal; 3,578 (9.46%)	Green; 268 (0.70%)	Other; 379 (1.00%)	

==== Northwest Winnipeg ====
Electoral district	Candidates					Incumbent
Electoral district	NDP	PC	Liberal	Green	Other	Incumbent
Burrows	Doug Martindale; 3,790 (70.75%)	Rick Negrych; 1,005 (18.76%)	Bernd Hohne; 562 (11.09%)			Doug Martindale
Inkster	Romulo Magsino; 2,358 (34.13%)	Roger Bennett; 543 (7.89%)	Kevin Lamoureux; 3,962 (57.49%)			Kevin Lamoureux
Kildonan	Dave Chomiak; 5,012 (61.35%)	Brent Olynyk; 2,360 (28.89%)	Wade Parke; 554 (6.78%)	Nathan Zahn; 203 (2.49%)		Dave Chomiak
Point Douglas	George Hickes; 2,665 (66.36%)	Alexa Rosentreter; 481 (11.98%)	Mary Lou Bourgeois; 591 (14.72%)	Kristen Andrews; 213 (5.30%)	Darrell Rankin (Communist); 66 (1.64%)	George Hickes
St. Johns	Gord Mackintosh; 4,223 (68.59%)	Tim Hooper; 1,018 (16.53%)	Selina Sapong-Bieber; 604 (9.81%)	Dawn Carey; 291 (4.72%)		Gord Mackintosh
The Maples	Mohinder Saran; 3,617 (55.64%)	Lou Fernandez; 1,895 (29.15%)	Pritam Brar; 928 (14.27%)			Cris Aglugub†
Wellington	Flor Marcelino; 2,332 (53.35%)	José Tomas; 570 (12.97%)	Rhonda Gordon Powers; 718 (16.72%)		Joe Chan (Ind); 501 (11.53%); Conrad Santos (Ind); 183 (4.19%)	Conrad Santos
Totals	NDP; 23,997 (56.75%)	PC; 7,872 (18.62%)	Liberal; 7,912 (18.71%)	Green; 707 (1.67%)	Other; 794 (1.88%)	

==== Northeast Winnipeg ====
Electoral district	Candidates					Incumbent
Electoral district	NDP	PC	Liberal	Green	Other	Incumbent
Concordia	Gary Doer; 3,862 (69.05%)	Ken Waddell; 1,209 (21.62%)	Leslie Worthington; 336 (6.01%)	Andrew Basham; 186 (3.33%)		Gary Doer
Elmwood	Jim Maloway; 3,873 (61.51%)	Allister Carrington; 1,323 (21.01%)	David Love; 1,101 (17.48%)			Jim Maloway
Radisson	Bidhu Jha; 4,804 (56.72%)	Linda West; 2,988 (35.28%)	Murray Cliff; 677 (7.99%)			Bidhu Jha
River East	Kurt Penner; 4,299 (46.07%	Bonnie Mitchelson; 4,348 (46.63%)	Margaret von Lau; 635 (6.80%)			Bonnie Mitchelson
Rossmere	Erna Braun; 4,824 (60.38%)	Cathy Cox; 2,602 (32.56%)	Isaiah Oyeleru; 521 (6.52%)			Harry Schellenberg†
St. Boniface	Greg Selinger; 5,068 (66.04%)	Jennifer Tarrant; 999 (12.88%)	Gilbert Laberge; 1,044 (13.61%)	Alain Landry; 528 (6.88%)	Thane-Dominic Carr (Communist); 44 (0.58%)	Greg Selinger
Transcona	Daryl Reid; 4,560 (68.74%)	Bryan McLeod; 1,470 (22.16%)	Gerald Basarab; 604 (9.10%)			Daryl Reid
Totals	NDP; 31,290 (60.28%)	PC; 14,939 (28.78%)	Liberal; 4,918 (9.48%)	Green; 714 (1.38%)	Other; 44 (0.08%)	

==== West Winnipeg ====
Electoral district	Candidates					Incumbent
Electoral district	NDP	PC	Liberal	Green	Other	Incumbent
Assiniboia	Jim Rondeau; 5,177 (62.21%)	Kelly de Groot; 2,686 (32.38%)	Bernie Bellan; 459 (5.52%)			Jim Rondeau
Charleswood	Mel Willis; 2,598 (31.66%)	Myrna Driedger; 4,460 (54.36%)	Michael Rosenberg; 1,106 (13.51%)			Myrna Driedger
Kirkfield Park	Sharon Blady; 4,985 (49.32%)	Chris Kozier; 3,852 (38.12%)	Doug Kayler; 1,261 (12.56%)			Vacant
St. James	Bonnie Korzeniowski; 4,231 (55.65%)	Kristine McGhee; 2,344 (30.83%)	Fred Morris; 656 (8.63%)	Mike Johannson; 339 (4.47%)		Bonnie Korzeniowski
Tuxedo	Matt Schaubroeck; 2,590 (30.62%)	Heather Stefanson; 3,982 (47.07%)	Audra Bayer; 1,865 (21.92%)			Heather Stefanson
Totals	NDP; 19,581 (45.32%)	PC; 17,324 (40.10%)	Liberal; 5,347 (12.38%)	Green; 954 (2.21%)		

==== Central Winnipeg ====
Electoral district	Candidates					Incumbent
Electoral district	NDP	PC	Liberal	Green	Other	Incumbent
Fort Rouge	Jennifer Howard; 3,828 (46.97%)	Christine Waddell; 1,202 (14.75%)	Paul Hesse; 2,488 (30.53%)	Gerald Enns; 511 (6.27%)	Frank Komarniski (Communist); 29 (0.36%); Ron Nash (Ind); 92 (1.13%)	Tim Sale†
Lord Roberts	Diane McGifford; 4,499 (57.86%)	Wilf Makus; 1,367 (17.58%)	Larry Schenkeveld; 1,219 (15.68%)	Vere Scott; 655 (8.42%)		Diane McGifford
Minto	Andrew Swan; 3,355 (62.82%)	Kenny Daodu; 658 (12.32%)	Wayne Helgason; 1,158 (21.68%)		Cheryl-Anne Carr (Communist); 102 (1.91%)	Andrew Swan
River Heights	Fiona Shiells; 1,843 (19.77%)	Ashley Burner; 2,341 (25.11%)	Jon Gerrard; 4,760 (51.06%)	Christine Bennet-Clark; 378 (4.05%)		Jon Gerrard
Wolseley	Rob Altemeyer; 4,005 (63.88%)	Gustav Nelson; 712 (11.44%)	Raven Thundersky; 700 (11.31%)	Ardythe Basham; 761 (12.07%)	David Tymoshchuk (Communist); 82 (1.30%)	Rob Altemeyer
Totals	NDP; 17,530 (47.71%)	PC; 6,279 (17.09%)	Liberal; 10,325 (28.10%)	Green; 2305 (6.27%)	Others; 305 (0.83%)	

==== South Winnipeg ====
Electoral district	Candidates					Incumbent
Electoral district	NDP	PC	Liberal	Green	Other	Incumbent
Fort Garry	Kerri Irvin-Ross; 4,291 (52.60%)	Shaun McCaffrey; 2,101 (25.75%)	Craig Hildahl; 1,500 (18.39%)	Alon Weinberg; 264 (3.26%)		Kerri Irvin-Ross
Fort Whyte	Sunny Dhaliwal; 3,895 (33.83%)	Hugh McFadyen; 5,981 (51.95%)	Angelina Olivier-Job; 1,637 (14.22%)			Hugh McFadyen
Riel	Christine Melnick; 4,894 (57.19%)	Trudy Turner; 2,620 (30.69%)	Grant Woods; 1,024 (11.99%)			Christine Melnick
Seine River	Theresa Oswald; 5,786 (56.89%)	Steven Andjelic; 3,275 (32.20%)	Jennifer Lukovich; 1,111 (14.68%)			Theresa Oswald
Southdale	Erin Selby; 5,772 (51.04%)	Jack Reimer; 4,493 (39.74%)	Don Woodstock; 1,042 (9.22%)			Jack Reimer
St. Norbert	Marilyn Brick; 4,044 (53.74%)	Tara Brousseau; 2,404 (31.94%)	Wendy Bloomfield; 1,077 (14.31%)			Marilyn Brick
St. Vital	Nancy Allan; 4,611 (61.74%)	Grant Cooper; 1,754 (23.41%)	Harry Wolbert; 776 (10.36%)	Kristine Koster; 351 (4.68%)		Nancy Allan
Totals	NDP; 33,293 (53.63%)	PC; 20,008 (32.23%)	Liberal; 8,167 (13.15%)	Green; 615 (0.99%)		

=== Synopsis of results ===
2007 Manitoba general election – synopsis of riding results
Electoral division	Winning party							Votes						
Electoral division	2003	1st place	Votes	Share	Margin #	Margin %	2nd place	NDP	PC	Lib	Grn	Ind	Comm	Total
Arthur-Virden	PC	PC	4,451	64.05%	2,310	33.24%	NDP	2,141	4,451	357	–	–	–	6,949
Assiniboia	NDP	NDP	5,177	62.21%	2,491	29.93%	PC	5,177	2,686	459	–	–	–	8,322
Brandon East	NDP	NDP	3,760	53.95%	1,105	15.86%	PC	3,760	2,655	554	–	–	–	6,969
Brandon West	NDP	PC	4,730	48.04%	56	0.57%	NDP	4,674	4,730	398	–	–	43	9,845
Burrows	NDP	NDP	3,790	70.75%	2,785	51.99%	PC	3,790	1,005	562	–	–	–	5,357
Carman	PC	PC	3,845	58.45%	2,405	36.56%	NDP	1,440	3,845	1,293	–	–	–	6,578
Charleswood	PC	PC	4,469	54.61%	1,866	22.80%	NDP	2,603	4,469	1,111	–	–	–	8,183
Concordia	NDP	NDP	3,862	69.05%	2,653	47.43%	PC	3,862	1,209	336	186	–	–	5,593
Dauphin-Roblin	NDP	NDP	4,214	53.64%	957	12.18%	PC	4,214	3,257	385	–	–	–	7,856
Elmwood	NDP	NDP	3,873	61.51%	2,550	40.50%	PC	3,873	1,323	1,101	–	–	–	6,297
Emerson	PC	PC	3,636	60.11%	2,340	38.68%	NDP	1,296	3,636	1,117	–	–	–	6,049
Flin Flon	NDP	NDP	2,262	77.60%	1,609	55.20%	Lib	2,262	–	653	–	–	–	2,915
Fort Garry	NDP	NDP	4,291	52.60%	2,190	26.84%	PC	4,291	2,101	1,500	266	–	–	8,158
Fort Rouge	NDP	NDP	3,828	46.97%	1,340	16.44%	Lib	3,828	1,202	2,488	511	92	29	8,150
Fort Whyte	PC	PC	5,981	51.95%	2,086	18.12%	NDP	3,895	5,981	1,637	–	–	–	11,513
Gimli	NDP	NDP	5,946	58.74%	2,496	24.66%	PC	5,946	3,450	727	–	–	–	10,123
Inkster	Liberal	Liberal	3,962	57.73%	1,604	23.37%	NDP	2,358	543	3,962	–	–	–	6,863
Interlake	NDP	NDP	4,047	59.51%	1,602	23.56%	PC	4,047	2,445	309	–	–	–	6,801
Kildonan	NDP	NDP	5,012	61.63%	2,652	32.61%	PC	5,012	2,360	556	204	–	–	8,132
Kirkfield Park	PC	NDP	4,997	49.32%	1,135	11.20%	PC	4,997	3,862	1,273	–	–	–	10,132
La Vérendrye	NDP	NDP	4,018	51.12%	1,045	13.30%	PC	4,018	2,973	490	–	379	–	7,860
Lac du Bonnet	PC	PC	4,866	59.01%	2,093	25.38%	NDP	2,773	4,866	607	–	–	–	8,246
Lakeside	PC	PC	4,448	56.19%	1,817	22.95%	NDP	2,631	4,448	488	349	–	–	7,916
Lord Roberts	NDP	NDP	4,499	58.13%	3,132	40.47%	PC	4,499	1,367	1,219	655	–	–	7,740
Minnedosa	PC	PC	3,790	52.79%	1,021	14.22%	NDP	2,769	3,790	268	281	72	–	7,180
Minto	NDP	NDP	3,355	63.63%	2,197	41.67%	Lib	3,355	658	1,158	–	–	102	5,273
Morris	PC	PC	4,404	56.98%	1,887	24.41%	NDP	2,517	4,404	808	–	–	–	7,729
Pembina	PC	PC	5,192	77.24%	4,232	62.96%	NDP	960	5,192	570	–	–	–	6,722
Point Douglas	NDP	NDP	2,665	66.36%	2,074	51.64%	Lib	2,665	481	591	213	–	66	4,016
Portage la Prairie	PC	PC	3,344	48.31%	409	5.91%	NDP	2,935	3,344	643	–	–	–	6,922
Radisson	NDP	NDP	4,804	56.72%	1,816	21.44%	PC	4,804	2,988	677	–	–	–	8,469
Riel	NDP	NDP	4,894	57.32%	2,274	26.63%	PC	4,894	2,620	1,024	–	–	–	8,538
River East	PC	PC	4,361	46.85%	52	0.56%	NDP	4,309	4,361	639	–	–	–	9,309
River Heights	Liberal	Liberal	4,760	51.06%	2,419	25.95%	PC	1,843	2,341	4,760	378	–	–	9,322
Rossmere	NDP	NDP	4,836	60.71%	2,228	27.97%	PC	4,836	2,608	522	–	–	–	7,966
Rupertsland	NDP	NDP	2,092	58.45%	807	22.55%	PC	2,092	1,285	202	–	–	–	3,579
Russell	PC	PC	4,141	58.49%	1,766	24.94%	NDP	2,375	4,141	564	–	–	–	7,080
Seine River	NDP	NDP	5,786	56.88%	2,511	24.69%	PC	5,786	3,275	1,111	–	–	–	10,172
Selkirk	NDP	NDP	4,584	55.64%	1,633	19.82%	PC	4,584	2,951	704	–	–	–	8,239
Southdale	PC	NDP	5,772	51.05%	1,279	11.31%	PC	5,772	4,493	1,042	–	–	–	11,307
Springfield	PC	PC	5,165	58.46%	2,509	28.40%	NDP	2,656	5,165	1,014	–	–	–	8,835
St. Boniface	NDP	NDP	5,090	66.04%	4,041	52.43%	Lib	5,090	993	1,049	530	–	45	7,707
St. James	NDP	NDP	4,231	55.88%	1,887	24.92%	PC	4,231	2,344	656	340	–	–	7,571
St. Johns	NDP	NDP	4,223	68.82%	3,205	52.23%	PC	4,223	1,018	604	291	–	–	6,136
St. Norbert	NDP	NDP	4,044	53.74%	1,640	21.79%	PC	4,044	2,404	1,077	–	–	–	7,525
St. Vital	NDP	NDP	4,611	61.55%	2,857	38.13%	PC	4,611	1,754	776	351	–	–	7,492
Ste. Rose	PC	PC	3,599	59.14%	1,577	25.91%	NDP	2,022	3,599	465	–	–	–	6,086
Steinbach	PC	PC	6,144	82.98%	5,503	74.32%	NDP	641	6,144	351	268	–	–	7,404
Swan River	NDP	NDP	4,522	58.40%	1,607	20.75%	PC	4,522	2,915	306	–	–	–	7,743
The Maples	NDP	NDP	3,617	56.16%	1,722	26.74%	PC	3,617	1,895	928	–	–	–	6,440
The Pas	NDP	NDP	3,262	68.86%	2,246	47.41%	PC	3,262	1,016	459	–	–	–	4,737
Thompson	NDP	NDP	3,036	73.90%	2,380	57.94%	Lib	3,036	416	656	–	–	–	4,108
Transcona	NDP	NDP	4,560	68.74%	3,090	46.58%	PC	4,560	1,470	604	–	–	–	6,634
Turtle Mountain	PC	PC	4,318	66.10%	2,842	43.50%	NDP	1,476	4,318	739	–	–	–	6,533
Tuxedo	PC	PC	3,982	47.26%	1,392	16.52%	NDP	2,590	3,982	1,854	–	–	–	8,426
Wellington	NDP	NDP	2,332	53.96%	1,601	37.04%	Lib	2,332	567	731	–	692 (Note: The incumbent Conrad Santos left the NDP shortly before the election and campaigned as an Independent, receiving 183 votes.)	–	4,322
Wolseley	NDP	NDP	4,038	63.88%	3,275	51.81%	Grn	4,038	715	723	763	–	82	6,321

= open seat
= winning candidate was in previous Legislature
= incumbent had switched allegiance
= previously incumbent in another riding
= incumbency arose from a byelection gain
= not incumbent; was previously elected to the Legislature
= other incumbents renominated
= previously an MP in the House of Commons of Canada
= multiple candidates

=== Turnout, winning shares and swings ===
Summary of riding results by turnout, vote share for winning candidate, and swing (vs 2003)
Riding and winning party			Turnout		Vote share (Note: Share won by winning candidate, with difference noted from share achieved by the same party in 1986.)		Swing (Note: Positive indicates improvement to standing of party winning in 1986; negative points to 1986's second-place party being swung to.)	
Riding and winning party			%	Change (pp)	%	Change (pp)	To	Change (pp)
Arthur-Virden	PC	Hold	56.79	-3.61	64.05	10.25	PC	10.66
Assiniboia	NDP	Hold	61.85	1.98	62.21	-0.84	PC	-2.74
Brandon East	NDP	Hold	58.72	6.06	53.95	-8.09	PC	-6.77
Brandon West	PC	Gain	66.80	6.37	48.04	13.12	PC	-13.33
Burrows	NDP	Hold	50.12	-0.01	70.75	1.74	NDP	6.41
Carman	PC	Hold	53.18	-0.96	58.45	6.59	PC	6.9
Charleswood	PC	Hold	59.43	-0.81	54.61	6.29	PC	13.44
Concordia	NDP	Hold	47.42	0.92	69.05	-7.62	PC	-6.56
Dauphin-Roblin	NDP	Hold	60.46	-1.77	53.64	-0.63	PC	-3.48
Elmwood	NDP	Hold	49.98	2	61.51	-4.42	PC	-2.47
Emerson	PC	Hold	49.51	0.97	60.11	0.69	PC	1.78
Flin Flon	NDP	Hold	36.25	-2.93	77.60	4.39	Lib	-0.52
Fort Garry	NDP	Hold	66.06	2.57	52.60	5.85	NDP	12.89
Fort Rouge	NDP	Hold	62.29	7.64	46.97	-10.67	PC	-2.85
Fort Whyte	PC	Hold	59.15	2.54	51.95	-0.76	NDP	-3.23
Gimli	NDP	Hold	62.91	1.19	58.74	2.18	NDP	2.82
Inkster	Lib	Hold	61.45	0.09	57.73	4.34	Lib	5.72
Interlake	NDP	Hold	56.53	6.63	59.51	-4.25	PC	-5.26
Kildonan	NDP	Hold	58.57	5.26	61.63	-8.5	PC	-11.23
Kirkfield Park	NDP	Gain	69.21	7.77	49.32	18.26	NDP	-13.43
La Verendrye	NDP	Hold	60.06	7.52	51.12	-6.95	PC	-5.11
Lac du Bonnet	PC	Hold	58.52	-2	59.01	7.75	PC	9.74
Lakeside	PC	Hold	57.64	1.25	56.19	3.23	PC	4.42
Lord Roberts	NDP	Hold	55.57	1.88	58.13	-3.86	PC	-2.36
Minnedosa	PC	Hold	58.99	2.83	52.79	5.42	PC	7.02
Minto	NDP	Hold	50.43	3.18	63.63	-5.84	Lib	-7.27
Morris	PC	Hold	54.13	1.57	56.98	-0.18	NDP	-5.01
Pembina	PC	Hold	44.95	1.85	77.24	1	PC	0.48
Point Douglas	NDP	Hold	40.14	-0.1	66.36	-8.5	Lib	-4.49
Portage la Prairie	PC	Hold	57.22	0.18	48.31	-1.51	NDP	-0.59
Radisson	NDP	Hold	60.24	6.19	56.72	4.28	NDP	4.06
Riel	NDP	Hold	63.04	1.89	57.32	3.29	NDP	5.22
River East	PC	Hold	67.58	-0.43	46.85	-4.44	NDP	-2.49
River Heights	Lib	Hold	69.35	1.92	51.06	2.36	Lib	3.1
Rossmere	NDP	Hold	61.70	3.48	60.71	-4.84	PC	-3.91
Rupertsland	NDP	Hold	33.50	5.38	58.45	-29.07	Lib	-14.14
Russell	PC	Hold	60.94	-2.4	58.49	6.53	PC	6.88
Seine River	NDP	Hold	63.25	3.91	56.88	5.82	NDP	8.01
Selkirk	NDP	Hold	59.18	4.68	55.64	-7.05	NDP	2.26
Southdale	NDP	Gain	65.74	9.78	51.05	15.01	NDP	-13.15
Springfield	PC	Hold	56.78	0.99	58.46	-2.16	NDP	-0.63
St. Boniface	NDP	Hold	59.56	7.36	66.04	-8.29	Lib	-3.74
St. James	NDP	Hold	59.14	3.63	55.88	2.2	NDP	2.29
St. Johns	NDP	Hold	51.45	3.73	68.82	-3.58	Lib	-0.33
St. Norbert	NDP	Hold	65.47	7.3	53.74	5.06	NDP	5.49
St. Vital	NDP	Hold	58.46	6.3	61.55	-1.88	PC	-0.74
Ste. Rose	PC	Hold	50.71	-2.02	59.14	2.49	PC	2.2
Steinbach	PC	Hold	49.98	7.99	82.98	8.35	PC	7.47
Swan River	NDP	Hold	65.22	5.04	58.40	-4.84	PC	-6.46
The Maples	NDP	Hold	55.05	5.94	56.16	-24.87	PC	-17.66
The Pas	NDP	Hold	36.63	-3.84	68.86	3.25	NDP	5.62
Thompson	NDP	Hold	39.82	2.28	73.90	-8.83	PC	-2.79
Transcona	NDP	Hold	48.80	0.26	68.74	-0.74	NDP	3.14
Turtle Mountain	PC	Hold	54.39	-0.47	66.10	6.08	PC	6.1
Tuxedo	PC	Hold	60.53	4.22	47.26	-5.56	NDP	-5.47
Wellington	NDP	Hold	46.05	1.58	53.96	-20.01	Lib	-10.87
Wolseley	NDP	Hold	55.28	2.14	63.88	6.99	NDP	7.2

=== Changes in party shares ===
Share change analysis by party and riding (2007 vs 2003)
Riding	Green		Liberal		NDP		PC	
Riding	%	Change (pp)	%	Change (pp)	%	Change (pp)	%	Change (pp)
Arthur-Virden			5.14	0.83	30.81	-11.08	64.05	10.25
Assiniboia	–	-1.25	5.52	-2.53	62.21	-0.84	32.28	4.63
Brandon East			7.95	3.56	53.95	-8.09	38.10	5.46
Brandon West			4.04	-0.01	47.48	-13.55	48.04	13.12
Burrows	–	-2.12	10.49	-11.09	70.75	1.74	18.76	11.47
Carman			19.66	-7.21	21.89	0.62	58.45	6.59
Charleswood			13.58	-20.58	31.81	14.29	54.61	6.29
Concordia	3.33	3.33	6.01	-1.21	69.05	-7.62	21.62	5.51
Dauphin-Roblin	–	-2.55	4.90	-3.15	53.64	-0.63	41.46	6.33
Elmwood			17.48	5.01	61.51	-4.42	21.01	0.52
Emerson			18.47	-2.87	21.43	2.17	60.11	0.69
Flin Flon			22.40	5.42	77.60	4.39	–	-9.81
Fort Garry	3.26	3.26	18.39	11.57	52.60	5.85	25.75	-19.94
Fort Rouge	6.27	1.3	30.53	13.56	46.97	-10.67	14.75	-4.97
Fort Whyte			14.22	-4.94	33.83	5.7	51.95	-0.76
Gimli			7.18	1.28	58.74	2.18	34.08	-3.46
Inkster	–	-1.5	57.73	4.34	34.36	-7.1	7.91	4.26
Interlake			4.54	-2.02	59.51	-4.25	35.95	6.27
Kildonan	2.51	0.59	6.84	-6.06	61.63	-8.5	29.02	13.96
Kirkfield Park			12.56	-9.65	49.32	18.26	38.12	-8.6
La Verendrye			6.23	-1.13	51.12	-6.95	37.82	3.26
Lac du Bonnet			7.36	3.97	33.63	-11.72	59.01	7.75
Lakeside	4.41	4.41	6.16	-2.03	33.24	-5.61	56.19	3.23
Lord Roberts	8.46	2.17	15.75	1.76	58.13	-3.86	17.66	0.87
Minnedosa	3.91	3.91	3.73	-0.16	38.57	-8.63	52.79	5.42
Minto	–	-3.82	21.96	8.69	63.63	-5.84	12.48	0.35
Morris			10.45	-9.67	32.57	9.85	56.98	-0.18
Pembina			8.48	0.28	14.28	0.04	77.24	1
Point Douglas	5.30	5.3	14.72	0.48	66.36	-8.5	11.98	3.21
Portage la Prairie			9.29	1.84	42.40	-0.33	48.31	-1.51
Radisson			7.99	-0.42	56.72	4.28	35.28	-3.85
Riel			11.99	3.86	57.32	3.29	30.69	-7.14
River East			6.86	3.89	46.29	0.54	46.85	-4.44
River Heights	4.05	1.79	51.06	2.36	19.77	0.03	25.11	-3.84
Rossmere			6.55	1.86	60.71	-4.84	32.74	2.98
Rupertsland			5.64	-0.79	58.45	-29.07	35.90	29.86
Russell			7.97	0.71	33.55	-7.24	58.49	6.53
Seine River			10.92	4.38	56.88	5.82	32.20	-10.2
Selkirk			8.54	-11.56	55.64	-7.05	35.82	18.61
Southdale			9.22	-3.71	51.05	15.01	39.74	-11.3
Springfield			11.48	3.07	30.06	-0.91	58.46	-2.16
St. Boniface	6.88	6.88	13.61	-0.82	66.04	-8.29	12.88	1.65
St. James	4.49	4.49	8.66	-4.32	55.88	2.2	30.96	-2.38
St. Johns	4.74	0.95	9.84	-2.93	68.82	-3.58	16.59	6.1
St. Norbert	–	-2.7	14.31	3.56	53.74	5.06	31.95	-5.92
St. Vital	4.68	2.11	10.36	0.19	61.55	-1.88	23.41	-0.41
Ste. Rose			7.64	-0.58	33.22	-1.92	59.14	2.49
Steinbach	3.62	1.42	4.74	-3.19	8.66	-6.59	82.98	8.35
Swan River			3.95	-3.23	58.40	-4.84	37.65	8.07
The Maples			14.41	14.41	56.16	-24.87	29.43	10.46
The Pas			9.69	-7.98	68.86	3.25	21.45	4.73
Thompson			15.97	12.07	73.90	-8.83	10.13	-3.25
Transcona			9.10	-7.01	68.74	-0.74	22.16	7.76
Turtle Mountain			11.31	0.04	22.59	-6.12	66.10	6.08
Tuxedo			22.00	0.18	30.74	5.38	47.26	-5.56
Wellington			16.91	1.74	53.96	-20.01	13.12	3.33
Wolseley	12.07	-7.42	11.44	-1.08	63.88	6.99	11.31	0.22

= did not field a candidate in 2003

== By-elections since 2007 ==
Manitoba provincial by-election, March 2, 2010: Concordia Resignation of Gary Doer
Party	Candidate	Votes	%	±%	Expenditures
New Democratic	Matt Wiebe	2,065	58.90	-10.15	$20,394.67
Progressive Conservative	Brian Biebrich	694	19.79	-1.82	$9,160.24
Liberal	Judi Heppner	613	17.48	11.48	$5,750.52
Green	Ellen Young	134	3.82	0.50	$762.27
Total valid votes		3,506	–	–	
Rejected		11	–		
Eligible voters / turnout		11,150	31.44	-15.98	
Source(s) Source:

Manitoba provincial by-election, March 24, 2009: Elmwood Resignation of Jim Maloway
Party	Candidate	Votes	%	±%	Expenditures
New Democratic	Bill Blaikie	2,325	53.76	-7.75	$17,603.25
Progressive Conservative	Adrian Schulz	913	21.11	0.10	$15,919.78
Liberal	Regan Wolfrom	877	20.28	2.79	$27,106.33
Green	James R. Beddome	210	4.86	–	$1,115.73
Total valid votes		4,325	–	–	
Rejected		14	–		
Eligible voters / turnout		11,907	36.44	−13.54	
Source(s) Source:

Manitoba provincial by-election, March 24, 2009: The Pas Death of Oscar Lathlin
Party	Candidate	Votes	%	±%	Expenditures
New Democratic	Frank Whitehead	2,949	75.11	+6.25	25,898.41
Progressive Conservative	Edna Nabess	722	18.39	-3.06	31,676.75
Liberal	Maurice Berens	255	6.50	-3.19	9,255.99
Total valid votes		3,926	99.32	–	
Rejected		27	0.68	-0.13	
Turnout		3,953	29.65	-6.98	
Eligible voters		13,334			
New Democratic hold		Swing		+4.66	
Source(s) Source: "2009 The Pas Byelection Results" (PDF). Elections Manitoba.

== See also ==
- New Democratic Party of Manitoba candidates in the 2007 Manitoba provincial election
