= Minister of Energy, Science and Technology (Manitoba) =

The Minister of Energy, Science and Technology was a cabinet position in the province of Manitoba, Canada, created in 2002.

The minister given certain responsibilities from the Ministry of Industry, Economic Development and Mines in September 2006, and renamed as the Ministry of Science, Technology, Energy and Mines.

== List of ministers of energy, science and technology ==
Name	Party	Took office	Left office
Tim Sale	New Democratic Party	September 25, 2002	October 12, 2004
Dave Chomiak	New Democratic Party	October 12, 2004	September 21, 2006
