= Dave Chomiak =

Canadian politician

Manitoba Minister of Mineral Resources
- In office October 18, 2013 – May 3, 2016
- Premier: Greg Selinger
- Preceded by: new portfolio

Manitoba Minister of Innovation, Energy and Mines
- In office November 3, 2009 – October 18, 2013
- Premier: Greg Selinger
- Preceded by: Jim Rondeau
- Succeeded by: portfolio abolished

Manitoba Minister of Conservation
- In office October 19, 2011 – January 13, 2012
- Premier: Greg Selinger
- Preceded by: Bill Blaikie
- Succeeded by: Gord Mackintosh

Manitoba Minister of Justice and Attorney General
- In office September 21, 2006 – November 3, 2009
- Premier: Gary Doer; Greg Selinger
- Succeeded by: Andrew Swan

Manitoba Government House Leader
- In office September 21, 2006 – November 3, 2009

Manitoba Minister of Energy, Science and Technology
- In office October 12, 2004 – September 21, 2006
- Premier: Gary Doer
- Preceded by: Tim Sale
- Succeeded by: portfolio abolished

Manitoba Minister of Health
- In office October 5, 1999 – October 12, 2004
- Premier: Gary Doer
- Preceded by: Eric Stefanson
- Succeeded by: Tim Sale

Member of the Legislative Assembly of Manitoba for Kildonan
- In office September 11, 1990 – April 19, 2016
- Preceded by: Jack Reimer
- Succeeded by: Nic Curry

Personal details
- Born: February 15, 1953 (age 73) Winnipeg, Manitoba
- Party: New Democratic Party
- Occupation: Lawyer

David Walter Chomiak (born February 15, 1953) is a former politician in Manitoba, Canada. He served as a cabinet minister in the New Democratic Party government of Greg Selinger.

Chomiak was born in Winnipeg and grew up in East Kildonan, graduating from Miles Macdonell Collegiate; he lives in the East Kildonan area. He worked as a lawyer before entering politics, and was a member of the Ukrainian Cultural and Educational Centre, the Canadian Shield Foundation and the Big Brother's Association of Manitoba.

Chomiak was first elected to the Legislative Assembly of Manitoba in the 1990 provincial election, in the north Winnipeg riding of Kildonan. He defeated Progressive Conservative candidate David Langtry by 210 votes; Progressive Party leader Sidney Green finished fourth. After the election, Chomiak joined with 19 other NDP MLAs as the official opposition to Gary Filmon's government.

Chomiak was re-elected in the 1995 election, defeating Tory Robert Praznik 5812 votes to 3624. He again increased his margin of victory in the 1999 election, defeating PC candidate Shannon Martin by 6101 votes to 2542. The NDP won this election, and Chomiak was appointed to cabinet as Minister of Health and Minister responsible for Sport. He was relieved of responsibility for Sport on January 17, 2001.

In 2003, Chomiak supported Bill Blaikie's campaign to lead the federal New Democratic Party.

In 2003, he was re-elected in the once-marginal riding of Kildonan with over 70% of the vote. On October 12, 2004, he was appointed as Manitoba's Minister of Energy, Science and Technology, with responsibility for the Gaming Control Act and the Manitoba Hydro Act. Chomiak had been the longest-serving health minister in Canada prior to this shuffle, and there were rumours that he requested a transfer to a less stressful portfolio.

In September 2006, Chomiak was appointed as Minister of Justice and Attorney General, and to the Manitoba Public Insurance and Manitoba Gaming Control Commission in Gary Doer's new cabinet.

Chomiak is anti-abortion, but as health minister never sought to criminalize abortions. He was re-elected in the 2007 provincial election.

In the 2016 provincial election, he was defeated by Progressive Conservative candidate Nic Curry.

Political offices
Preceded by Jim Rondeau as Manitoba Minister of Science, Technology, Energy and Mines	Manitoba Minister of Innovation, Energy and Mines; November 3, 2009 – May 3, 2016	
Preceded by Gord Mackintosh	Manitoba Minister of Justice and Attorney General; September 21, 2006 – November 3, 2009	Succeeded by Andrew Swan
Preceded by Gord Mackintosh	Manitoba Government House Leader; September 21, 2006 – November 3, 2009	Succeeded by Bill Blaikie
Preceded by Eric Stefanson	Manitoba Minister of Energy, Science and Technology; October 12, 2004 – September 21, 2006	Succeeded by Jim Rondeau as Manitoba Minister of Science, Technology, Energy and Mines
Preceded by Eric Stefanson	Manitoba Minister of Health; October 5, 1999 – October 12, 2004	Succeeded by Tim Sale
Legislative Assembly of Manitoba
Preceded by Neil Gaudry	Member of the Legislative Assembly for Kildonan; September 11, 1990 – present	Incumbent
