= Mary Gordon (child advocate) =

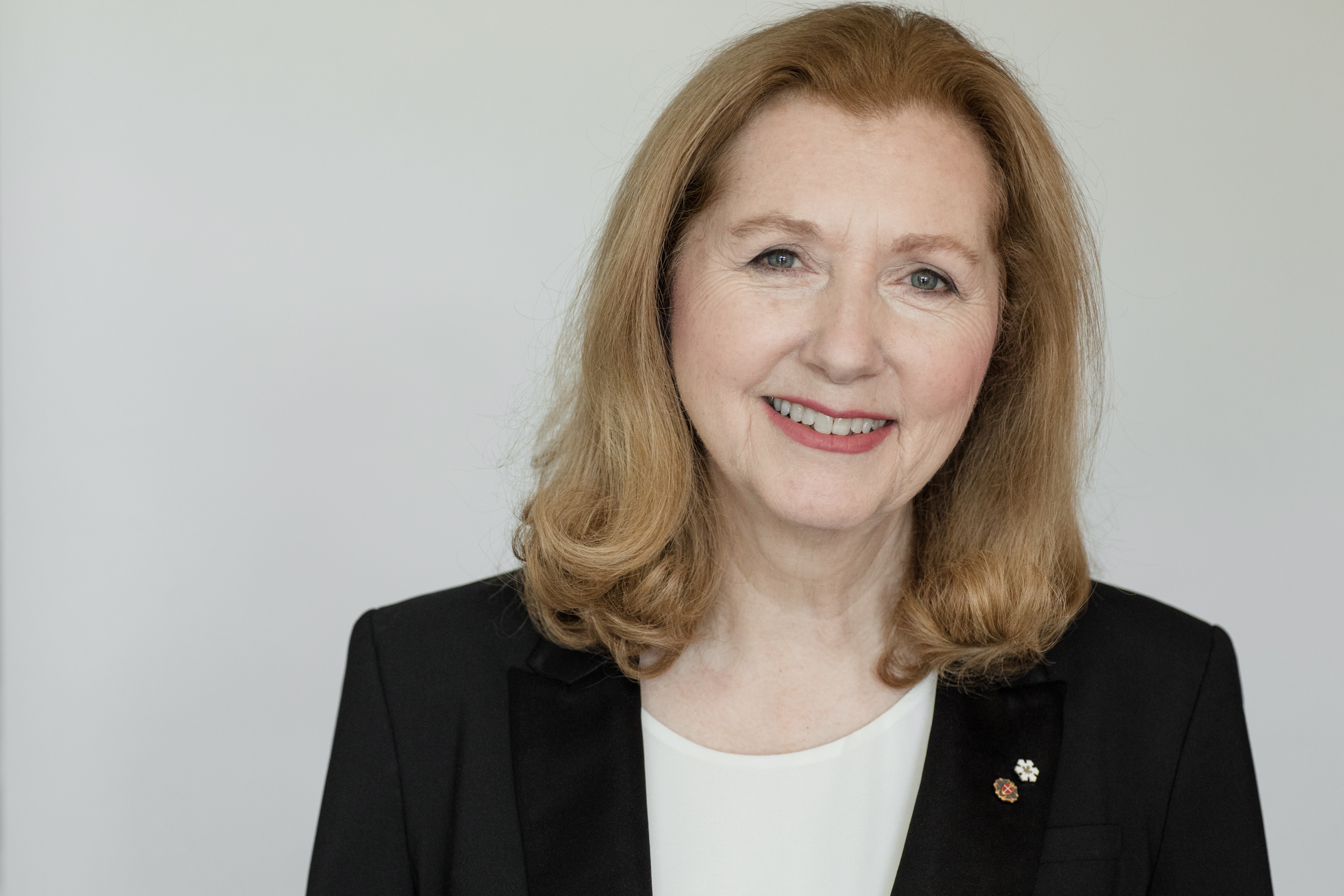

Mary Gordon (born 13 October 1947) is a Canadian social entrepreneur, educator, author, child advocate and parenting expert, known for creating the Roots of Empathy program for elementary schools and the Seeds of Empathy program for early childhood settings. These programs focus on fostering empathy, emotional literacy, and social connection in children based on the parent–infant relationship.

She founded the Canadian charity Roots of Empathy to break intergenerational cycles of violence, which has since expanded to multiple countries and languages. The Roots of Empathy program has been the subject of independent research demonstrating reductions in aggression and bullying, and increases empathy and in pro-social behaviours such as caring including and kindness.

Gordon serves as the president and CEO of Roots of Empathy. She is also credited with coining the phrase "Love grows brains™", referencing the impact of the attachment relationship on early brain development.

== Biography ==
Gordon grew up in Newfoundland, but later moved to Toronto, Ontario. In her early career, she was a kindergarten teacher. In 1981, she founded Canada's first school-based Parenting and Family Literacy centres, which have become public policy in Ontario and are being used as a model for similar programs internationally.

In 1996, she founded Roots of Empathy, a classroom-based program for children in elementary school, and in 2005 she founded Seeds of Empathy, a related program for younger children in early childhood settings.

== Selected works ==
Gordon's 2005 Canadian non-fiction bestseller, Roots of Empathy: Changing the World Child by Child, concerns child development and empathy and outlines the philosophy behind the Roots of Empathy program. It was ranked as one of the Top 100 Books of the Year in the category of "Ideas" by The Globe and Mail in 2006.

== Speaking and consulting ==
Gordon is an international public speaker and often acts as an advisor for governments, educational organizations, and public institutions. She has presented on early childhood development to conferences organized by the World Health Organization, and the United States government, among others. She worked with the World Health Organization's Commission on the Social Determinants of Health's Knowledge Network for Early Childhood Development for their report Total Environment Assessment Model for Early Childhood Development. She was also invited to share her parenting expertise with the Nelson Mandela Children's Foundation in South Africa.

Gordon has twice been invited to meet with the Dalai Lama. Their first meeting was in 2006, at the Vancouver Dialogues, and their second was in 2008, in Seattle, Washington, as part of the Dalai Lama's Seeds of Compassion event. The Dalai Lama has said he believes programs such as Gordon's Roots of Empathy will build world peace.

== Awards and appointments ==
Gordon is the recipient of several prestigious awards recognizing her contribution to innovation in education and international social entrepreneurship, including The Fraser Mustard Award and a Distinguished Canadian Educator Award. In 2002, she was selected as the first female Canadian Fellow in the Ashoka Foundation. an international organization that supports social entrepreneurs. She is currently a member of the Ashoka Foundation's board of directors. In 2006, she was invested as a Member of the Order of Canada. In July 2009, she was given the Public Education Advocacy Award by the Canadian Teachers' Federation. In 2018, she was appointed to the Order of Ontario, the province's highest honour, for her work as a "social entrepreneur, educator, author, child advocate and parenting expert".
