= Billie Cross =

Canadian politician

Billie Cross MLA

Member of the Legislative Assembly of Manitoba for Seine River
- Incumbent
- Assumed office October 3, 2023
- Preceded by: Janice Morley-Lecomte

Personal details
- Born: October 10, 1972 (age 54) Winnipeg, Manitoba, Canada
- Party: New Democratic Party (provincial and federal)
- Spouse: Steve
- Children: 3
- Occupation: Teacher; politician; small business owner

Billie Cross is a Canadian politician, who was elected to the Legislative Assembly of Manitoba in the 2023 Manitoba general election. She represents the district of Seine River as a member of the New Democratic Party of Manitoba.

Prior to her election, she worked as a teacher with the Louis Riel School Division, which serves schools in southeast Winnipeg. She also co-owns a butcher shop with her husband. Her mother's family is Métis and her father's family is of Ukrainian descent.

== Electoral history ==
2023 Manitoba general election: Seine River
Party	Candidate	Votes	%	±%	Expenditures
New Democratic	Billie Cross	5,381	52.08	+26.07	$31,139.94
Progressive Conservative	Janice Morley-Lecomte	3,974	38.46	-6.58	$39,828.20
Liberal	James Bloomfield	846	8.19	-13.97	$0.00
Independent	Martin J. Stadler	131	1.27	–	$1,388.96
Total valid votes/expense limit		10,332	99.64	–	$63,492.00
Total rejected and declined ballots		37	0.36	–	
Turnout		10,369	63.64	+1.52	
Eligible voters		16,293			
Source(s) Source: Elections Manitoba
New Democratic gain from Progressive Conservative		Swing		+16.32	

2019 Canadian federal election: Saint Boniface—Saint Vital
Party	Candidate	Votes	%	±%	Expenditures
Liberal	Dan Vandal	20,300	42.88	-15.56	$44,810.61
Conservative	Rejeanne Caron	15,436	32.61	+3.92	$74,515.57
New Democratic	Billie Cross	8,037	16.98	+6.39	none listed
Green	Ben Linnick	2,671	5.64	+3.35	$2,073.90
People's	Adam McAllister	591	1.25		$4,426.19
Independent	Sharma Baljeet	303	0.64		none listed
Total valid votes/expense limit		47,338	99.43		
Total rejected ballots		269	0.57	+0.25	
Turnout		47,607	69.37	-4.61	
Eligible voters		68,631			
Liberal hold		Swing		-9.74	
Source: Elections Canada

2019 Manitoba general election: Lagimodière
Party	Candidate	Votes	%	±%	Expenditures
Progressive Conservative	Andrew Smith	5,187	51.78	-12.1	$22,483.72
New Democratic	Billie Cross	2,792	27.87	+5.8	$11,981.93
Liberal	Jake Sacher	1,481	14.78	+0.9	$5,080.09
Green	Bob Krul	557	5.56	+5.4	$0.00
Total valid votes		10,017	99.47		
Total rejected ballots		53	0.53		
Turnout		10,070	62.27		
Eligible voters		16,172			
Progressive Conservative hold		Swing		-9.0	
