= Romulo Magsino =

Filipino-Canadian educator (1941 – 2022)

- Born: January 1, 1941; Lucena, Philippines
- Died: November 5, 2022 (aged 81); Winnipeg, Manitoba, Canada
- Occupations: Educator, academic, community leader
- Known for: Dean of Education, University of Manitoba
- Spouse: Patria Leah Enverga
- Children: 3
- Honors: Order of Manitoba (2008)

Romulo F. Magsino, Sr. OM, PhD (January 1, 1941 – November 5, 2022) was a Filipino-Canadian educator, academic, and community leader. He was the first Filipino-Canadian to serve as dean of education at a major Canadian university and was widely recognized for his scholarship on multiculturalism, immigration, and intercultural education. In 2008, he was inducted into the Order of Manitoba.

== Early life and education ==
Magsino was born in Lucena, Philippines. Growing up during World War II, he experienced poverty but benefited from the value his family placed on education.

He earned dual undergraduate degrees—a Bachelor of Arts and a Bachelor of Science in Education—from Luzonian Colleges in 1952, graduating with Latin honors. After several years as a high school teacher, he received a scholarship to pursue graduate studies. He earned a master’s degree in philosophy of education from the University of Sydney, and a PhD from the University of Wisconsin–Madison.

== Academic career ==
=== Memorial University of Newfoundland ===
In 1971, Magsino immigrated to Canada and began working as an assistant professor at Memorial University of Newfoundland. He later became a full professor and chaired the Department of Educational Administration and Foundations.

=== University of Manitoba ===
In 1988, Magsino moved to Winnipeg and joined the University of Manitoba as Head of the Department of Educational Administration and Foundations. In 1996, he became the Dean of the Faculty of Education, becoming the first Filipino-Canadian to hold such a position at a Canadian university. He held the deanship until 2001 and was named dean emeritus in 2005.

His academic focus included education in the context of globalization, pluralism, and multiculturalism in Canadian society.

== Publications ==
Magsino authored a number of books and monographs, over 70 academic articles, and numerous conference papers and presentations. Notable works include:

- Tropical Islanders in the Atlantic: A Study of Filipino Experiences in Newfoundland (1982)
- The First Filipino Immigrants in Manitoba, 1959–1975 (1995) – editor
- Teachers in Trouble: An Exploration of the Normative Character of Teaching (1997) – co-author

He also contributed to journals such as Encounters in Theory and History of Education in 1999.

== Community involvement ==
Magsino held leadership roles in various community organizations. He served as:

- President of the Filipino Association of Newfoundland and Labrador (1975–1976)
- Vice-president for Atlantic Canada, United Council of Filipino Associations in Canada (1984)
- Founding president of the Philippine-Canadian Centre of Manitoba (PCCM)

He also served on the Manitoba Ethnocultural Advisory and Advocacy Council (2001), the Manitoba Immigration Council (2004), and on advisory boards for The Winnipeg Foundation and Seven Oaks General Hospital Foundation.

In 2006, he was acclaimed as the New Democratic Party candidate in Inkster riding and ran in the 2007 Manitoba general election, though he was not elected.

== Honours and awards ==
- Queen Elizabeth II Golden Jubilee Medal (2002)
- Queen Elizabeth II Diamond Jubilee Medal (2012)
- Philippine Presidential Citation for Outstanding Filipino Overseas (2006)
- Order of Manitoba (2008)

In 2017, the University of Manitoba established the Romulo F. Magsino Prize, awarded annually to an incoming student in its Faculty of Education.

== Death ==
Magsino died in Winnipeg on November 5, 2022, and was interred at Thomson In The Park Cemetery.
