= Janice Morley-Lecomte =

Canadian politician

Minister of Mental health and Community Wellness
- In office January 30, 2023 – October 18, 2023
- Premier: Heather Stefanson
- Preceded by: Sarah Guillemard
- Succeeded by: Bernadette Smith

Member of the Legislative Assembly of Manitoba for Seine River
- In office April 19, 2016 – September 5, 2023
- Preceded by: Theresa Oswald
- Succeeded by: Billie Cross

Personal details
- Party: Conservative (federal); Progressive Conservative (provincial)

Janice Morley-Lecomte is a Canadian provincial politician, who was elected as the Member of the Legislative Assembly of Manitoba for the riding of Seine River in the 2016 election. She is a member of the Progressive Conservative party, and defeated NDP challenger Lise Pinkos in the election. She was re-elected in the 2019 provincial election, and defeated in 2023 by Billie Cross.

In 2025, Morley-Lecomte won the Conservative Party of Canada nomination for Winnipeg South in the 2025 Canadian federal election. She would later be defeated by Liberal incumbent, Terry Duguid.

== Electoral record ==
2025 Canadian federal election: Winnipeg South
Party	Candidate	Votes	%	±%	Expenditures
Liberal	Terry Duguid	27,287	58.78	+10.63	
Conservative	Janice Morley-Lecomte	16,315	35.14	+2.44	
New Democratic	Joanne Bjornson	2,093	4.51	–9.83	
People's	Johann Rempel Fehr	427	0.92	–2.42	
Green	Manjit Kaur	301	0.65	–0.83	
Total valid votes/expense limit					
Total rejected ballots					
Turnout		46,423	72.23		
Eligible voters		64,271			
Liberal notional hold		Swing		+4.10	
Source: Elections Canada

2023 Manitoba general election: Seine River
Party	Candidate	Votes	%	±%	Expenditures
New Democratic	Billie Cross	5,381	52.08	+26.07	$31,139.94
Progressive Conservative	Janice Morley-Lecomte	3,974	38.46	-6.58	$39,828.20
Liberal	James Bloomfield	846	8.19	-13.97	$0.00
Independent	Martin J. Stadler	131	1.27	–	$1,388.96
Total valid votes/expense limit		10,332	99.64	–	$63,492.00
Total rejected and declined ballots		37	0.36	–	
Turnout		10,369	63.64	+1.52	
Eligible voters		16,293			
Source(s) Source: Elections Manitoba
New Democratic gain from Progressive Conservative		Swing		+16.32	

2019 Manitoba general election: Seine River
Party	Candidate	Votes	%	±%	Expenditures
Progressive Conservative	Janice Morley-Lecomte	4,372	45.04	-8.24	$33,665.77
New Democratic	Durdana Islam	2,525	26.01	+2.88	$12,437.08
Liberal	James Bloomfield	2,151	22.16	-1.42	$12,202.10
Green	Bryanne Lamoureux	659	6.79	New	$0.00
Total valid votes		9,707	99.45		
Total rejected ballots		54	0.55		
Turnout		9,761	62.12		
Eligible voters		15,712			

2016 Manitoba general election: Seine River
Party	Candidate	Votes	%	±%	Expenditures
Progressive Conservative	Janice Morley-Lecomte	5,396	53.28	+9.35	$45,124.99
Liberal	Peter Chura	2,388	23.58	+20.74	$9,466.12
New Democratic	Lise Pinkos	2,343	23.13	-29.75	$21,504.71
Total valid votes/expense limit		10,127	100.0		$47,949.00
Total rejected ballots		177	–	–	
Turnout		10,304	66.80	–	
Eligible voters		15,424			
Source: Elections Manitoba
