= Louise Dacquay =

Canadian politician

27th Speaker of the Legislative Assembly of Manitoba
- In office May 23, 1995 – August 17, 1999
- Preceded by: Denis Rocan
- Succeeded by: George Hickes

Member of the Legislative Assembly of Manitoba for Seine River
- In office September 11, 1990 – June 3, 2003
- Preceded by: None
- Succeeded by: Theresa Oswald

Personal details
- Born: Louise White; June 25, 1940 (age 86) Manitou, Manitoba, Canada
- Party: Progressive Conservative
- Occupation: Teacher

Louise Dacquay (born June 25, 1940) is a politician in Manitoba, Canada. She was a member of the Legislative Assembly of Manitoba from 1990 to 2003, and served as speaker of the assembly from 1995 to 1999.

Dacquay was born Louise White, the daughter of Horace White, in Manitou, Manitoba. She is a certified business education teacher, and worked as an educator for seventeen years, mostly in the Fort Garry School Division of Winnipeg. In 1962, she married Hubert J. Dacquay. She was a regional organizer for the Progressive Conservative Party of Manitoba from 1984 to 1986, and an executive director of the party from 1987 to 1989.

Dacquay served on the Winnipeg City Council from 1986 to 1989, representing the Langevin Ward. She won the seat from veteran councillor Evelyne Reese in 1986, but lost it to Reese three years later.

She was first elected to the Manitoba legislature in the 1990 provincial election, defeating incumbent Liberal Herold Driedger by forty-seven votes in the south-end Winnipeg constituency of Seine River. She was named deputy speaker of the assembly on October 11, 1990, and held this position for the next four and a half years.

Dacquay was re-elected by an increased margin in the 1995 provincial election, and was appointed speaker of the assembly by premier Gary Filmon on May 23, 1995. Unlike her predecessor, Denis Rocan, she was often accused of partisanship by members of the opposition New Democratic Party. NDP legislator Steve Ashton called for her resignation in 1996, after she refused to grant him permission to raise a point of privilege during a debate on the privatization of Manitoba's telephone system. Dacquay is generally regarded, along with Myrna Phillips of the NDP, as one of the weakest and most partisan Speakers in recent history.

The Progressive Conservatives were defeated in the provincial election of 1999, though Dacquay was personally re-elected in Seine River. She served as opposition critic for culture, heritage and tourism in the legislative session which followed. The NDP campaign targeted Seine River in the 2003 election, and Dacquay lost her constituency to NDP candidate Theresa Oswald by a margin of 4,314 votes to 3,582.
