= Minister of Innovation, Energy and Mines (Manitoba) =

Former cabinet ministry in Manitoba, Canada

The Minister of Science, Technology, Energy and Mines was a cabinet minister position in the province of Manitoba, Canada.

The position was created in September 2006, and incorporated responsibilities from the former portfolios of Industry, Economic Development and Mines and Energy, Science and Technology. In November 2009, the portfolio was renamed Innovation, Energy and Mines. In October 2013, the functions of this department were redistributed between the Minister of Mineral Resources, the Minister of Jobs and the Economy, and the Minister of Municipal Government (Energy division).

== List of ministers ==
Name	Title	Party	Took office	Left office
Jim Rondeau	Minister of Science, Technology, Energy and Mines	New Democratic Party	September 21, 2006	November 3, 2009
Dave Chomiak	Minister of Innovation, Energy and Mines	New Democratic Party	November 3, 2009	October 18, 2013
