= Minister of Housing and Community Development (Manitoba) =

Cabinet minister in Manitoba, Canada

The Minister of Housing and Community Development was a cabinet minister position in the province of Manitoba, Canada. The position was created in 2009 following the separation of the Family Services and Housing portfolio. The responsibilities were transferred to the Minister of Families on May 3, 2016.

== List of ministers of housing and community development ==
Name	Party	Took office	Left office
Kerri Irvin-Ross	New Democratic Party	November 3, 2009	October 18, 2013
Peter Bjornson	New Democratic Party	October 18, 2013	November 3, 2014
Kerri Irvin-Ross	New Democratic Party	November 3, 2014	April 29, 2015
Mohinder Saran	New Democratic Party	April 29, 2015	May 3, 2016
