= Andrew Smith (Canadian politician) =

Canadian provincial politician

Minister of Municipal Relations
- In office January 30, 2023 – October 18, 2023
- Premier: Heather Stefanson
- Preceded by: Eileen Clarke
- Succeeded by: Ian Bushie

Minister of Sport, Culture and Heritage
- In office January 18, 2022 – January 30, 2023
- Premier: Heather Stefanson
- Preceded by: Cathy Cox
- Succeeded by: Obby Khan

Member of the Legislative Assembly of Manitoba for Lagimodière
- In office September 10, 2019 – September 5, 2023
- Preceded by: new district
- Succeeded by: Tyler Blashko

Member of the Legislative Assembly of Manitoba for Southdale
- In office April 19, 2016 – August 12, 2019
- Preceded by: Erin Selby
- Succeeded by: Audrey Gordon

Personal details
- Party: Progressive Conservative

Andrew Smith is a Canadian politician and former member of the Legislative Assembly of Manitoba. He served as a legislator from the Progressive Conservative Party of Manitoba. He was first elected in the 2016 election as MLA for Southdale, and re-elected in 2019 as MLA for the new electoral district of Lagimodière, which was created partly from his former constituency. He served until he lost the seat in 2023.

== Electoral record ==
2023 Manitoba general election: Lagimodière
Party	Candidate	Votes	%	±%	Expenditures
New Democratic	Tyler Blashko	5,711	46.24	+18.37	$29,394.93
Progressive Conservative	Andrew Smith	5,599	45.33	-6.45	$41,864.78
Liberal	Walt Nilsson	1,041	8.43	-6.36	$304.63
Total valid votes/expense limit		12,351	99.56	–	$75,746.00
Total rejected and declined ballots		54	0.44	–	
Turnout		12,405	64.05	+1.78	
Eligible voters		19,367			
New Democratic gain from Progressive Conservative		Swing		+12.41	
Source(s) Source: Elections Manitoba

2019 Manitoba general election: Lagimodière
Party	Candidate	Votes	%	±%	Expenditures
Progressive Conservative	Andrew Smith	5,187	51.78	-12.1	$22,483.72
New Democratic	Billie Cross	2,792	27.87	+5.8	$11,981.93
Liberal	Jake Sacher	1,481	14.78	+0.9	$5,080.09
Green	Bob Krul	557	5.56	+5.4	$0.00
Total valid votes		10,017	99.47		
Total rejected ballots		53	0.53		
Turnout		10,070	62.27		
Eligible voters		16,172			
Progressive Conservative hold		Swing		-9.0	

2016 Manitoba general election: Southdale
Party	Candidate	Votes	%	±%	Expenditures
Progressive Conservative	Andrew Smith	6,663	63.82	+18.83	$43,062.01
New Democratic	Dashi Zargani	2,460	23.56	-28.45	$19,423.93
Liberal	Ryan Colyer	1,318	12.62	+9.62	$1,526.57
Total valid votes/expense limit		10,441	97.78	-	$53,274.00
Total rejected ballots		237	2.22	+1.90	
Turnout		10,678	62.31	-7.82	
Eligible voters		17,137			
Progressive Conservative gain from New Democratic		Swing		+23.64	
Source: Elections Manitoba
