= Tyler Blashko =

Canadian politician

Tyler Blashko MLA
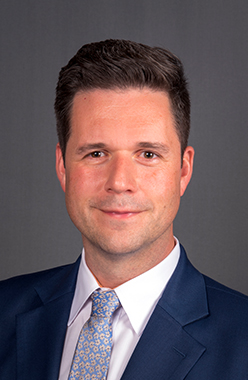
- Official portrait, 2023

Member of the Legislative Assembly of Manitoba for Lagimodière
- Incumbent
- Assumed office October 3, 2023
- Preceded by: Andrew Smith

Personal details
- Born: January 23, 1986 (age 40)
- Party: New Democratic
- Education: University of Manitoba (MPA); University of Winnipeg (BBA)

Tyler Blashko is a Canadian politician, who was elected to the Legislative Assembly of Manitoba in the 2023 Manitoba general election. He represents the district of Lagimodière as a member of the Manitoba New Democratic Party.

Prior to his election, he worked as an educator with the Seven Oaks School Division. He has a master's degree in public administration from the University of Manitoba and a bachelor's degree in both business administration and urban and inner-city studies from the University of Winnipeg. He is Métis. He attended Collège Béliveau for high school.

== Electoral history ==
2023 Manitoba general election: Lagimodière
Party	Candidate	Votes	%	±%	Expenditures
New Democratic	Tyler Blashko	5,711	46.24	+18.37	$29,394.93
Progressive Conservative	Andrew Smith	5,599	45.33	-6.45	$41,864.78
Liberal	Walt Nilsson	1,041	8.43	-6.36	$304.63
Total valid votes/expense limit		12,351	99.56	–	$75,746.00
Total rejected and declined ballots		54	0.44	–	
Turnout		12,405	64.05	+1.78	
Eligible voters		19,367			
New Democratic gain from Progressive Conservative		Swing		+12.41	
Source(s) Source: Elections Manitoba
