= Minister of Mineral Resources (Manitoba) =

Ministerial position

The Minister of Mineral Resources is a cabinet position in the government of Manitoba, Canada. The position was created in 2013 when the portfolio of the former Minister of Innovation, Energy and Mines was dissolved. In 2016, the portfolio responsibilities were transferred to the new Minister of Growth, Enterprise and Trade.

List of ministers of mineral resources
Name	Party	Took office	Left office
Dave Chomiak	New Democratic Party	October 18, 2013	May 3, 2016
