= Kerri Irvin-Ross =

Canadian politician

Kerri Irvin-Ross MLA

6th Deputy Premier of Manitoba
- In office April 29, 2015 – May 3, 2016 Serving with Eric Robinson
- Premier: Greg Selinger
- Preceded by: Eric Robinson
- Succeeded by: Heather Stefanson

Manitoba Minister of Family Services
- In office October 18, 2013 – May 3, 2016
- Premier: Greg Selinger
- Preceded by: Jennifer Howard
- Succeeded by: Scott Fielding

Manitoba Minister of Housing and Community Development
- In office November 3, 2014 – April 29, 2015
- Premier: Greg Selinger
- Preceded by: Peter Bjornson
- Succeeded by: Mohinder Saran
- In office November 3, 2009 – October 18, 2013
- Premier: Greg Selinger
- Preceded by: Gord Mackintosh as Minister of Family Services and Housing
- Succeeded by: Peter Bjornson

Manitoba Minister of Healthy Living
- In office September 21, 2006 – November 3, 2009
- Premier: Gary Doer
- Preceded by: Theresa Oswald
- Succeeded by: Jim Rondeau

Member of the Legislative Assembly of Manitoba for Fort Richmond Fort Garry 2003–2011
- In office June 3, 2003 – April 19, 2016
- Preceded by: Joy Smith
- Succeeded by: Sarah Guillemard (Note: Guillemard succeeded Irvin-Ross as MLA for Fort Richmond; Mark Wasyliw became MLA for re-established Fort Garry in 2019.)

Personal details
- Party: New Democratic Party
- Profession: Social worker
- Website: kerriirvinross.ca

Kerri Irvin-Ross is a Canadian politician who served as a member of the Legislative Assembly of Manitoba from 2003 to 2016. A member of the New Democratic Party, she served as a cabinet minister under premiers Gary Doer and Greg Selinger, including as deputy premier in Selinger's government from 2015 to 2016.

Irvin-Ross defeated Progressive Conservative incumbent Member of the Legislative Assembly Joy Smith by 87 votes in the riding of Fort Garry in the 2003 general election. She defeated Progressive Conservative challenger Shaun McCaffrey in Fort Garry by 4,291 to 2,101 in the 2007 general election. Manitoba's decennial electoral redistribution of 2008 abolished Fort Garry. In the 2011 general election, Irvin-Ross chose to run in the newly created constituency of Fort Richmond, which comprised most of the southern part of her previous riding, and was re-elected over McCaffrey by 4,026 votes to 2,908. Irvin-Ross was defeated in the 2016 election, losing her seat to PC candidate Sarah Guillemard.

In 2006, Irvin-Ross joined Doer's cabinet as Minister of Healthy Living, holding the post until Doer's retirement in 2009. In 2009, shortly after he was sworn in as premier, Selinger named her to the new portfolio of Minister of Housing and Community Development. In 2013, she became Minister of Family Services and Minister responsible for Status of Women, which she held until 2016; she also briefly regained Housing and Community development from 2014 to 2015. In 2016, she was named Minister responsible for Persons with Disabilities and Minister responsible for the Civil Service, and in 2016 she became Deputy Premier of Manitoba. She held all three roles until the government's defeat in the 2016 election.
