= Roots of Empathy =

- Founded: 1996
- Founder: Mary Gordon
- Type: Educational
- Purpose: Society, Crime prevention
- Headquarters: Toronto, Ontario, Canada
- Location: Toronto, Ontario, Canada
- Region served: All provinces of Canada
- Website: https://rootsofempathy.org/

Roots of Empathy (ROE) is an evidence-based classroom program that started in Toronto, Canada. The program consists of guided observations of an infant's development and emotions by elementary school children. The project began in 1996, and was established by Mary Gordon, a Canadian social entrepreneur and educator. The project has since expanded to 11 countries.

== Method ==
The program consists of weekly classes with a Roots of Empathy instructor throughout the school year. The program consists of a classroom visit from a neighbourhood baby and parent every three weeks. The curriculum is divided into nine themes, with three classroom visits supporting each theme (a pre-family visit, family visit and post-family visit) for a total of 27 classes. Each of the nine themes is further broken down into four age ranges in primary schools.

Babies are between two and four months old at the beginning of the program.

The children are sat around the parent, baby and instructor. The baby's development and growth, along with the verbal and non-verbal interactions between the parent and the baby, are observed. Students are asked to complete both classroom curriculum tasks, such as measuring the height and weight of the baby and reading with the baby, and tasks designed to improve emotional intelligence, such as reflecting on their feelings about the interactions and on their classmates' displays of emotions.

== Research and evaluation ==
A cluster, randomized controlled field trial on the ROE program in 2011 in Manitoba demonstrated that children in program classrooms in contrast to the control classrooms exhibited that children in program classrooms in contrast to the control classrooms had reduced physical and indirect aggressive behavior (including bullying) and increased prosocial behavior, such as sharing. A follow-up study showed the decrease in aggression lasted up to three years. A study using a quasi-experimental control-group conducted in Vancouver and Toronto in 2012 found similar results, and that children had an improved understanding of infant crying.

== Availability and growth ==
The program is currently available in every province of Canada. In 2007, the program expanded internationally to New Zealand and the United States (Seattle, WA). It expanded to Northern Ireland in 2011, and London, England in 2012. Roots of Empathy has since been introduced to 11 countries including Scotland, Wales, Republic of Ireland, Germany, Switzerland, Costa Rica and the Netherlands in the fall of 2018. The curriculum has been translated into French, German, Spanish and Dutch.

== Cost and funding ==
In 2020, the average cost, without accounting for training costs, for the year-long Roots of Empathy program is $440 (CAD) per child – an average cost per class of $1000 (CAD). Roots of Empathy is funded by government grants, foundation funding, and corporate and individual donations.

== Recognition ==
In July 2008, the Assembly of First Nations, at their Annual General Assembly, passed Resolution 31 endorsing and supporting ROE and SOE as programs compatible with traditional First Nations teachings. In 2017, Roots of Empathy was recognized as one of the most inspiring global innovations in K–12 education by the Finnish organization HundrED.org. UpSocial selected Roots of Empathy as the winner of its social innovation competition Accelerating Change for Social Inclusion (ASCI) to address the risk to children of social exclusion.
