= Theresa Oswald =

Canadian politician

Minister of Jobs and the Economy
- In office 18 October 2013 – 3 November 2014
- Premier: Greg Selinger
- Preceded by: Peter Bjornson
- Succeeded by: Kevin Chief

Minister of Health
- In office 21 September 2006 – 18 October 2013
- Premier: Gary Doer
- Preceded by: Tim Sale
- Succeeded by: Erin Selby

Minister of Healthy Living
- In office 12 October 2004 – 21 September 2006
- Premier: Gary Doer
- Preceded by: Jim Rondeau

Member of the Legislative Assembly for Seine River
- In office 3 June 2003 – 19 April 2016
- Preceded by: Louise Dacquay
- Succeeded by: Janice Morley-Lecomte

Personal details
- Party: New Democratic Party
- Occupation: Vice-principal; High school English teacher

Theresa Oswald is a politician in Manitoba, Canada. She was a New Democratic Party member of the Legislative Assembly of Manitoba from 2003 to 2016 and a cabinet minister from 2004 until she stepped down in 2014 to unsuccessfully challenge Premier Greg Selinger for the party's leadership.

== Early life ==
Oswald was born and raised in the St. Vital neighbourhood of Winnipeg, Manitoba, and was a teacher and school administrator for fifteen years before entering politics. She initially taught English, later serving as vice-principal at Victor Mager School, Winnipeg in the Louis Riel Division. In the latter capacity, she frequently worked with children and families who arrived in Canada from war-ravaged countries. Oswald has also been involved in local groups such as the Victoria Hospital, the Zoological Society of Manitoba and Take Pride Winnipeg!.

== Political career ==
Oswald was part of the NDP's historic breakthrough in south-end Winnipeg in the provincial election of 2003, defeating incumbent Progressive Conservative Louise Dacquay in the riding of Seine River, 4,314 votes to 3,582. The NDP had never won this riding before. Oswald's campaign focused on greater access to post-secondary education and a tuition freeze for university students.

In August 2004, Oswald was appointed to lead a task-force committee looking for ways to encourage physical activity in the province's youth.

Oswald was appointed as a cabinet minister in Gary Doer's government on 12 October 2004, serving as the Minister responsible for Healthy Living, Seniors and Healthy Child Manitoba. In 2006, she was promoted to Minister of Health, where she introduced bold new initiatives such as making a family doctor available to every Manitoban, new investments in women's and maternal health, promoted organ donation and introduced groundbreaking legislation to require life-saving heart defibrillators in public places. Her work to improve cancer care, including making all cancer drugs available to patients at no charge, was celebrated by the Canadian Cancer Society with a Diamond Jubilee medal.

She was re-elected with an increased majority in the 2007 provincial election.

In 2013 she was again promoted to lead the government's new flagship department of Jobs and the Economy, where she has since focused on expanding access to training programs to help increase the supply of skilled workers, expanded supports for start-ups and young entrepreneurs and introduced a boost to housing benefits for those on social assistance and the working poor.

=== Challenge to Selinger's leadership ===
Oswald resigned her cabinet position on 3 November 2014, along with Jennifer Howard, Erin Selby, Stan Struthers, and Andrew Swan due to concerns about Premier Selinger's leadership. On 21 December 2014, Oswald declared her candidacy for the party leadership. Oswald was defeated by a margin of 33 votes on the second ballot at the leadership convention on 8 March 2015, by Selinger. Oswald remained an MLA after her defeat but did not run for re-election as an MLA in the 2016 provincial election.

== Electoral results ==
2011 Manitoba general election: Seine River
| Party | Candidate | Votes | % | ±% | Expenditures |
|---|---|---|---|---|---|
| New Democratic | Theresa Oswald | 5,500 | 52.88 | −4.01 | $26,190.15 |
| Progressive Conservative | Gord Steeves | 4,569 | 43.93 | +11.73 | $30,207.87 |
| Liberal | Troy Osiname | 295 | 2.84 | −8.04 | $1,577.80 |
| Total valid votes | | 10,364 | | | |
| Rejected and declined ballots | | 36 | | | |
| Turnout | | 10,400 | 70.82 | | |
| Electors on the lists | | 14,686 | | | |
Source: Elections Manitoba

2007 Manitoba general election: Seine River
| Party | Candidate | Votes | % | ±% | Expenditures |
|---|---|---|---|---|---|
| New Democratic | Theresa Oswald | 5,786 | 56.89 | +5.83 | $27,615.58 |
| Progressive Conservative | Steve Andjelic | 3,275 | 32.20 | -10.20 | $31,015.94 |
| Liberal | Jennifer Lukovich | 1,111 | 10.88 | +4.33 | $4,915.77 |
| Total valid votes | | 10,172 | 100.00 | | |
| Rejected and declined ballots | | 41 | | | |
| Turnout | | 10,213 | 63.35 | | |
| Electors on the lists | | 16,147 {{CANelec/source|Source: Elections Manitoba | | | |

2003 Manitoba general election: Seine River
| Party | Candidate | Votes | % |
|---|---|---|---|
| New Democratic | Theresa Oswald | 4,314 | 51.06 |
| Progressive Conservative | Louise Dacquay | 3,582 | 42.40 |
| Liberal | Luciano Vacca | 553 | 6.55 |
