= Minister responsible for Healthy Living =

Provincial cabinet post in Manitoba, Canada

From 2003 to 2009, the Executive Council of Manitoba included a minister responsible for Healthy Living. The position was created as a subset of the Ministry of Health, and was not a full cabinet portfolio.

The Minister of Healthy Living, Youth and Seniors existed from November 18, 2009 to January 13, 2012. The Minister of Healthy Living, Seniors and Consumer Affairs existed from January 13, 2012 to October 18, 2013, when the portfolio was redistributed between the Minister of Health and the Department of Tourism, Culture, Sport and Consumer Protection.

In October 2013, a Minister of Healthy Living and Seniors, not a full cabinet portfolio, was established as a subset within the Department of Health.

Following the 2016 election, premier Brian Pallister merged the Healthy Living and Seniors portfolio with Health, established the office of Health, Seniors and Active Living.

== List of ministers ==
=== Healthy Child Manitoba ===
Name	Party	Took office	Left office
Jim Rondeau	New Democratic Party	November 4, 2003	October 12, 2004
Theresa Oswald	New Democratic Party	October 12, 2004	September 21, 2006
Kerri Irvin-Ross	New Democratic Party	September 21, 2006	November 3, 2009
Jim Rondeau	New Democratic Party	November 3, 2009	January 13, 2012

=== Healthy living, seniors and consumer affairs ===
Name	Party	Took office	Left office
Jim Rondeau	New Democratic Party	January 13, 2012	October 18, 2013

=== Healthy living and seniors ===
Name	Party	Took office	Left office
Sharon Blady	New Democratic Party	October 18, 2013	November 3, 2014
Deanne Crothers	New Democratic Party	November 3, 2014	May 3, 2016
