= Erin Selby =

Canadian politician

Minister of Health
- In office October 18, 2013 – November 3, 2014
- Premier: Greg Selinger
- Preceded by: Theresa Oswald
- Succeeded by: Sharon Blady

Minister of Advanced Education and Literacy
- In office March 28, 2011 – October 18, 2013
- Premier: Greg Selinger
- Preceded by: Diane McGifford
- Succeeded by: portfolio abolished

Member of the Legislative Assembly of Manitoba for Southdale
- In office May 22, 2007 – September 4, 2015
- Preceded by: Jack Reimer
- Succeeded by: Andrew Smith

Personal details
- Born: Winnipeg, Manitoba
- Party: New Democratic Party
- Education: Concordia University
- Occupation: Journalist

Erin Selby is a politician and former TV personality in Winnipeg, Manitoba, Canada.

Selby earned a bachelor's degree in communications studies from Concordia University.

She previously co-hosted Breakfast Television on Citytv Winnipeg alongside Jon Ljungberg from August 4, 2005, to March 23, 2007. Before signing on with Citytv, she was a weather anchor for Global News Montreal and the consumer watch reporter for CTV Winnipeg. She also appeared in several movies as a reporter, including The Art of War with Wesley Snipes.

Selby was elected as the MLA for the NDP in the riding of Southdale in the 2007 Manitoba provincial election.

It was announced on March 28, 2011, that Greg Selinger, the Premier of Manitoba, had appointed Selby to be Manitoba's new Minister of Advanced Education and Literacy. She replaced Diane McGifford, who planned not to run again in the provinical election that fall.

In October 2013, Selby became Manitoba's Health Minister. Just over a year later, she resigned her cabinet position on November 3, 2014, along with Jennifer Howard, Theresa Oswald, Stan Struthers, and Andrew Swan as part of an ultimately unsuccessful cabinet revolt due to concerns about Premier Selinger's leadership. She remained an NDP MLA after her resignation.

Selby was the NDP candidate in the riding of Saint Boniface—Saint Vital in the 2015 Canadian federal election, coming a distant third; Dan Vandal won the constituency for the Liberal Party in its near sweep of Winnipeg-area federal seats.

== Electoral history ==
2015 Canadian federal election: Saint Boniface—Saint Vital
Party	Candidate	Votes	%	±%	Expenditures
Liberal	Dan Vandal	28,530	58.44	+27.23	$69,923.02
Conservative	François Catellier	14,005	28.69	-21.44	$152,734.08
New Democratic	Erin Selby	5,169	10.59	-5.20	$73,670.05
Green	Glenn Zaretski	1,119	2.29	-0.59	$485.69
Total valid votes/expense limit		48,823	99.69		$200,203.09
Total rejected ballots		152	0.31	–	
Turnout		48,975	73.97	–	
Eligible voters		66,205			
Liberal gain from Conservative		Swing		+24.34	
Source: Elections Canada

2011 Manitoba general election: Southdale
Party	Candidate	Votes	%	Expenditures
New Democratic	Erin Selby	5,662	51.84	$29,012.79
Progressive Conservative	Judy Eastman	4,898	44.85	$36,267.68
Liberal	Amarjit Singh	327	2.99	$3,107.04
Total valid votes/expense limit		10,887	100.00	$43,733.00
Total rejected ballots		35	0.41	
Turnout		10,922	70.13	+4.39
Eligible voters		15,574		
New Democratic hold		Swing		-2.96
Source: Elections Manitoba

2007 Manitoba general election: Southdale
Party	Candidate	Votes	%	Expenditures
New Democratic	Erin Selby	5,772	51.04	$30,198.49
Progressive Conservative	Jack Reimer	4,493	39.74	$31,445.97
Liberal	Don Woodstock	1,042	9.22	$4,974.42
Total valid votes/expense limit		11,307	100.00	
Total rejected ballots		44		
Turnout		11,351	65.74	+9.78
Eligible voters		17,267		
New Democratic gain		Swing		+13.32%

Political offices
Preceded by Diane McGifford	Manitoba Minister of Advanced Education and Literacy; March 28, 2011 –October 18, 2013	Succeeded by Portfolio Abolished
Legislative Assembly of Manitoba
Preceded by Jack Reimer	Member of the Legislative Assembly for Southdale; May 22, 2007 –September 4, 2015	Vacant
