= Leanne Rowat =

Canadian politician

Leanne Rowat is a politician in Manitoba, Canada. In 2003, she was elected to the Manitoba legislature as a Progressive Conservative.

Prior to entering public life herself, Rowat was a constituency assistant to Progressive Conservative MLA Harold Gilleshammer, and worked as a community development officer in the Souris region. She also served on the board of directors of the South West Regional Health Authority, and was a Public Relations Chair for the Manitoba Winter Games 2006 Bid Committee.

When Gilleshammer retired as MLA for Minnedosa in 2003, Rowat won the Progressive Conservative nomination to replace him. The riding is mostly rural, and is located in the province's southwestern corner. In the 2003 election, the governing New Democratic Party made the riding its top rural target. Rowat defeated NDP candidate Harvey Paterson, but by a margin of only twelve votes (as confirmed on recount). She has served as opposition critics in several areas: Culture, Heritage & Tourism; Aboriginal & Northern Affairs; Multiculturalism; and Communities Economic Development Fund. She is also a supporter of grandparents' rights.

Rowat was re-elected in the 2007 provincial election. Prior to the 2011 provincial election, the Minnedosa riding was redistributed and dissolved. Rowat ran for election in the new riding of Riding Mountain and won the seat in 2011.

== Electoral history ==
2011 Manitoba general election: Riding Mountain
Party	Candidate	Votes	%	Expenditures
Progressive Conservative	Leanne Rowat	4,465	58.47	$20,447.87
New Democratic	Albert Parsons	2,633	34.48	$10,993.16
Liberal	Carl Hyde	272	3.56	$284.81
Green	Signe Knutson	267	3.50	$536.64
Total valid votes		7,637	–	
Rejected		14	–	
Eligible voters / turnout		14,165	54.01	
Source(s) Source: Manitoba. Chief Electoral Officer (2011). Statement of Votes for the 40th Provincial General Election, October 4, 2011 (PDF) (Report). Winnipeg: Elections Manitoba. "Election Returns: 40th General Election". Elections Manitoba. 2011.

2007 Manitoba general election: Minnedosa
Party	Candidate	Votes	%	±%	Expenditures
Progressive Conservative	Leanne Rowat	3,790	52.79	+5.42	$22,692.31
New Democratic	Harvey Paterson	2,769	38.57	-8.63	$16,563.22
Green	James Beddome	281	3.91	–	$1,661.53
Liberal	Christopher Baker	268	3.73	-0.16	$340.29
Independent	Colin Atkins	72	1.00	-0.54	$1,218.45
Total valid votes		7,180	99.68	–	
Rejected		23	0.32	-0.01	
Turnout		7,203	58.99	+2.83	
Eligible voters		12,211			
Progressive Conservative hold		Swing		+7.02	
Source(s) Source: Manitoba. Chief Electoral Officer (2007). Statement of Votes for the 39th Provincial General Election, May 22, 2007 (PDF) (Report). Winnipeg: Elections Manitoba.

2003 Manitoba general election: Minnedosa
Party	Candidate	Votes	%	±%	Expenditures
Progressive Conservative	Leanne Rowat	3,259	47.37	-2.34	$18,639.72
New Democratic	Harvey Paterson	3,247	47.19	+9.48	$17,900.63
Liberal	Gordon Powell	268	3.90	-3.78	$2,590.10
Independent	Colin Atkins	106	1.54	–	
Total valid votes		6,880	99.67	–	
Rejected		23	0.33	-0.16	
Turnout		6,903	56.15	-6.73	
Eligible voters		12,293			
Progressive Conservative hold		Swing		-5.91	
Source(s) Source: Manitoba. Chief Electoral Officer (2003). Statement of Votes for the 38th Provincial General Election, June 3, 2003 (PDF) (Report). Winnipeg: Elections Manitoba.
