= Jim Rondeau =

Canadian politician

Minister of Healthy Living, Seniors and Consumer Affairs
- In office January 13, 2012 – October 18, 2013
- Premier: Greg Selinger

Minister of Healthy Living, Youth and Seniors
- In office November 3, 2009 – January 13, 2012
- Premier: Greg Selinger

Minister of Science, Energy, Technology and Mines
- In office September 21, 2006 – November 3, 2009
- Premier: Gary Doer

Minister of Industry, Economic Development and Mines
- In office October 12, 2004 – September 21, 2006
- Premier: Gary Doer
- Preceded by: Scott Smith

Member of the Legislative Assembly of Manitoba for Assiniboia
- In office September 21, 1999 – March 6, 2016
- Preceded by: Linda McIntosh
- Succeeded by: Steven Fletcher

Personal details
- Born: April 6, 1959 (age 67) Winnipeg, Manitoba, Canada
- Party: New Democratic Party
- Website: www.jimrondeau.mb.ca

Jim Rondeau (born April 6, 1959) is a former politician in Manitoba, Canada. He served as a member of the Legislative Assembly of Manitoba from 1999 to 2016, and served as cabinet minister in the provincial governments of Gary Doer and Greg Selinger from 2003 to 2013. Rondeau is a member of the New Democratic Party. Rondeau did not seek re-election in the 2016 Manitoba election.

== Early life and career ==
The son of Gaston Joseph Rondeau and Dorothy Jean Finch, he was born in Winnipeg, and was educated at John Taylor Collegiate. He holds a Bachelor of Education degree from the University of Winnipeg and has completed post-baccalaureate studies at the University of Manitoba. He was a teacher at Norway House High School from 1981 to 1984 and later taught at Cranberry Portage, before becoming coordinator of the Frontier School Division at the University of Winnipeg. Rondeau helped establish several learning centres and libraries throughout the province, and founded a school-to-work transition program for young people from northern Manitoba. He also coached the Winnipeg Eagles Volleyball Club, and was coach and manager of the Manitoba Volleyball team in several North American Aboriginal Games.

== Politician ==
=== Government backbencher ===
Rondeau was first elected to the Manitoba Legislature in the 1999 provincial election with a dramatic victory in the west-end Winnipeg riding of Assiniboia, previously regarded as safe for the Progressive Conservative Party. On election night, the final vote totals showed Progressive Conservative incumbent Linda McIntosh winning re-election by two votes. After the institutional ballots were counted, however, Rondeau was declared elected by six votes. A recount later reduced his majority to four, and a subsequent judicial ruling struck it down to three.

Rondeau entered the legislature as a backbench supporter of Gary Doer's government, and soon became known as a strong constituency worker. He kept a strong interest in educational issues, and was a frequent participant in debates at the St. James-Assiniboia School Board. He represented the provincial government at Manitoba's 2001 Hire a Student Day event, and was appointed to the board of Junior Achievement of Manitoba in 2003 with responsibility for Government, Education and Labor Relations. Rondeau also played an important role in assuring passage of the provincial Canadian Forces Personnel Act.

Rondeau is the first openly gay member of the Manitoba legislature, and was the keynote speaker of Winnipeg's 2000 Gay Pride Parade. He encouraged the Doer government to introduce full legal equality for gay and lesbian couples during its first term, and strongly supported 2002 legislation that ensured full equality for all common-law relationships. He later became a vocal supporter of same-sex marriage, which was legalized in Canada in 2005. Rondeau has said that his sexual orientation has never been controversial in his constituency, once telling a journalist, "People don't care one way or the other. I'm surprised, pleasantly surprised, that people don't make it an issue."

Rondeau supported Jack Layton for the leadership of the federal New Democratic Party in 2003.

=== Minister of Healthy Living ===
Rondeau's narrow victory in 1999 made his seat a key Progressive Conservative target in the 2003 election, but he was re-elected with 63% of the vote, winning every poll but one. In November 2003, he was appointed as Minister of Healthy Living within the Department of Health, with special responsibility for Seniors and Healthy Child Manitoba. He became a strong advocate for public awareness and preventative medicine, and indicated that the Doer government would consider removing the provincial sales tax from nutritional supplements and alternative foods.

In December 2003, Rondeau announced that Manitoba would ban all smoking from indoor public places and workplaces within a year. The initiative was described as the most ambitious anti-smoking strategy in Canada, and a February 2004 poll showed that many smokers were considering quitting in light of the ban. Rondeau introduced the anti-smoking bill in March 2004, and the ban came into effect at the beginning of October. The bill exempted tobacco shops as well as native reserves and casinos, which the government argued were outside provincial jurisdiction.

In March 2004, Rondeau announced that the Doer government had signed a $2.5-million contract to create a Prostate Centre at CancerCare Manitoba. He later handled negotiations concerning whether or not the Manitoba government would provide funding for an abortion clinic in Winnipeg. Despite some initial reluctance, he announced in July 2004 that the government would fully fund abortions at Jane's Clinic, once owned by Henry Morgentaler. In late April 2004, he announced that the provincial government would pay for child vaccinations against chicken pox, meningitis and pneumococcus.

Rondeau and Fort Garry representative Kerri Irvin-Ross co-chaired public hearings on Manitoba's privacy laws in May 2004. Later in the year, he announced that the government would establish a "Healthy Kids, Healthy Futures" committee of the legislature.

=== Minister of Industry, Economic Development and Mines ===
Rondeau was promoted to a full cabinet portfolio on October 12, 2004, as Minister of Industry, Economic Development and Mines. He indicated that Manitoba had the potential for strong economic growth in the mining sector, particularly in light of the need for raw materials in countries such as India and China. He also announced that he would work to reduce government bureaucracy in the sector, and make it easier for mining projects to get underway. The mining sector reported dramatic growth in 2005, highlighted by a new investment from Inco and a new gold mine project in Bissett.

Rondeau launched a farm immigration program in February 2005, making it easier for young farmers to move to Manitoba. He also expanded oil exploration in the province, removing the sales tax for drilling and exploration equipment. Manitoba's oil sector grew at a record level in 2006, with 478 new wells started.

In 2004–05, Rondeau accused the federal government and federal Health Minister Ujjal Dosanjh of undermining Manitoba's online pharmaceutical industry, which was then shipping large quantities of medication to the United States of America. He argued that the government should compensate Manitoba for lost jobs if it chose to shut down the sector. Rondeau later indicated that he would support a ban on bulk exports to America, but added that government intervention appeared to be unnecessary in any event.

As Industry minister, Rondeau was responsible for overseeing the troubled Crocus Investment Fund and faced difficult questions relating to the fund's management in early 2005. He acknowledged that the province was responsible for regulating Crocus, but argued that it had no involvement in the fund's day-to-day operations.

=== Minister of Science, Technology, Energy and Mines ===
After a cabinet shuffle on September 21, 2006, Rondeau was reassigned as Minister of Science, Technology, Energy and Mines. Soon after his appointment, he announced that the Doer government would spend $70M to clean up the province's abandoned mines.

Rondeau criticized the environmental strategy of Prime Minister Stephen Harper's Conservative government in late 2006, saying that Harper was not moving as assertively as had the previous government of Paul Martin. Notwithstanding this criticism, he indicated in early 2007 that Manitoba's share of a $1.5 billion federal Eco-Trust and Clean Air Fund will be at least $50 million, and could reach $100 million. He has said that the money will go to developing hydrogen technology for buses and providing energy efficiency programs for low-income Manitobans.

Rondeau supports a proposed east-west Canadian power grid, and has endorsed the federal government's plan for a national ban on inefficient incandescent light bulbs by 2012. In February 2007, he announced that anyone who registers an energy-efficient hybrid vehicle in Manitoba between 15 November 2006 and 15 November 2008 will receive a $2,000 rebate from the provincial government.

Rondeau was re-elected in the 2007 provincial election, as the New Democratic Party won a third consecutive majority government. He retained his position as Minister of Science, Technology, Energy and Mines, and was also appointed as interim Minister of Competitiveness, Training and Trade, a position he held until February 2008.

Rondeau has said that Manitoba would neither raise Hydro rates nor implement a carbon tax to promote conservation, arguing that the goal could be achieved by other means. He announced a "pause" on further uranium exploration permits the following month, after health and environmental concerns were raised by the Northlands Dene First Nation. He has also indicated that the provincial and federal governments will spend over half a million dollars to expand a biodiesel testing laboratory in Manitoba Hydro's East Selkirk plant, and has announced legislation to encourage further growth within the sector.

In late 2007, he wrote an editorial piece in support of a government policy requiring that 8.5% of the total volume of gasoline sold in Manitoba is to be ethanol. The mandate will take effect in 2008. In January 2008, Rondeau announced a tax credit for investments in small and medium-sized businesses.

== Electoral record ==
2007 Manitoba general election: Assiniboia
Party	Candidate	Votes	%	±%	Expenditures
New Democratic	Jim Rondeau	5,177	62.21	-0.84	$33,430.38
Progressive Conservative	Kelly de Groot	2,686	32.28	4.63	$32,070.95
Liberal	Bernie Bellan	459	5.52	-2.53	$340.32
Total valid votes		8,322	–	–	
Rejected		51	–		
Eligible voters / turnout		13,538	61.85	1.98	
Source(s) Source: Manitoba. Chief Electoral Officer (2007). Statement of Votes for the 39th Provincial General Election, May 22, 2007 (PDF) (Report). Winnipeg: Elections Manitoba.

2003 Manitoba general election: Assiniboia
Party	Candidate	Votes	%	±%	Expenditures
New Democratic	Jim Rondeau	5,147	63.05	18.82	$24,846.66
Progressive Conservative	Dennis Wishanski	2,257	27.65	-16.56	$23,921.25
Liberal	Monique Graboski	657	8.05	-3.51	$5,664.36
Green	Jesse Tottle	102	1.25	–	$14.14
Total valid votes		8,163	–	–	
Rejected		22	–		
Eligible voters / turnout		13,671	59.87	-12.49	
Source(s) Source: Manitoba. Chief Electoral Officer (2003). Statement of Votes for the 38th Provincial General Election, June 3, 2003 (PDF) (Report). Winnipeg: Elections Manitoba.

1999 Manitoba general election: Assiniboia
Party	Candidate	Votes	%	±%	Expenditures
New Democratic	Jim Rondeau	4,347	44.24	24.01	$12,989.00
Progressive Conservative	Linda McIntosh	4,344	44.20	-8.75	$26,190.58
Liberal	J. Deborah Shiloff	1,136	11.56	-15.26	$5,744.56
Total valid votes		9,827	–	–	
Rejected		53	–		
Eligible voters / turnout		13,653	72.37	1.60	
Source(s) Source: Manitoba. Chief Electoral Officer (1999). Statement of Votes for the 37th Provincial General Election, September 21, 1999 (PDF) (Report). Winnipeg: Elections Manitoba.

All Manitoba divisions were redistributed before the 1999 election.

All electoral information is taken from Elections Manitoba. Expenditure entries refer to individual candidate expenses.

== Footnotes ==
Manitoba provincial government of Gary Doer
Cabinet posts (3)
Predecessor	Office	Successor
Scott Smith	Minister of Competitiveness, Training and Trade; 2007-2008 interim	Andrew Swan
himself, Dave Chomiak*	Minister of Science, Technology, Energy and Mines; 2006-	incumbent
Scott Smith	Minister of Industry, Economic Development and Mines; 2004-2006	himself, Scott Smith*
Special Cabinet Responsibilities
Predecessor	Title	Successor
position created in 2003	Minister responsible for Healthy Child Manitoba; 2003-2004	Theresa Oswald
Diane McGifford	Minister responsible for Seniors; 2003-2004	Theresa Oswald
position created in 2003	Minister responsible for Healthy Living; 2003-2004; This was a subset of the Ministry of Health.	Theresa Oswald
