= Jennifer Howard (Canadian politician) =

Canadian politician

Manitoba Minister of Finance
- In office October 18, 2013 – November 3, 2014
- Premier: Greg Selinger
- Preceded by: Stan Struthers
- Succeeded by: Greg Dewar

Manitoba Minister of Family Services and Labour
- In office January 13, 2012 – October 18, 2013
- Premier: Greg Selinger
- Preceded by: new portfolio
- Succeeded by: portfolio abolished

Manitoba Government House Leader
- In office January 13, 2012 – October 18, 2013
- Premier: Greg Selinger

Manitoba Minister of Labour and Immigration
- In office November 3, 2009 – January 13, 2012
- Premier: Greg Selinger
- Preceded by: Nancy Allan

Member of the Legislative Assembly of Manitoba for Fort Rouge
- In office May 22, 2007 – April 19, 2016
- Preceded by: Tim Sale
- Succeeded by: Wab Kinew

Personal details
- Born: Brandon, Manitoba, Canada
- Party: New Democratic Party
- Spouse: Tara Peel
- Education: Brandon University
- Website: www.jenniferhoward.ca

Jennifer Howard is a Canadian politician and political staffer. She was most recently chief of staff to Jagmeet Singh, the leader of the federal New Democratic Party. She was previously a member of the Legislative Assembly of Manitoba, first elected in the 2007 provincial election in the electoral district of Fort Rouge. Howard is a member of the New Democratic Party.

Howard was born and raised in Brandon, where she graduated from Brandon University; she was the federal New Democratic Party candidate in Brandon—Souris in the 1997 election, coming fourth; Progressive Conservative candidate Rick Borotsik won. She moved to Winnipeg in 1998.

Prior to her election to the Legislative Assembly, Howard was employed as policy advisor to Premier of Manitoba Gary Doer on health care issues and as executive director of the Women's Health Clinic. She has also served on the boards of the College of Registered Nurses of Manitoba, the Canadian Centre for Policy Alternatives (Manitoba), the Rainbow Resource Centre and the University of Winnipeg's Board of Regents. She was named a Woman of Distinction in 1999 by the Brandon YWCA. She has also received a Community Builder Award from the Lambda Business and Professional Club of Winnipeg, an organization of gay and lesbian businesses and professionals.

Howard was elected as MLA for Fort Rouge in 2007. She served as vice-chair of the Public Accounts Committee. In November 2009, she was appointed the Minister of Labour and Immigration, Minister responsible for Persons with Disabilities and the Status of Women, and Minister charged with the administration of The Workers Compensation Act.

Howard resigned her cabinet position on November 3, 2014, along with Theresa Oswald, Erin Selby, Stan Struthers, and Andrew Swan due to concerns about Premier Greg Selinger's leadership. She remained an NDP MLA after her resignation from cabinet but did not seek re-election in 2016.

Howard served as campaign manager for the NDP during the 2025 Canadian federal election, which saw the party's worst result ever. She took responsibility and resigned from her role.

== Electoral record ==
2007 Manitoba general election: Fort Rouge
Party	Candidate	Votes	%	±%	Expenditures
New Democratic	Jennifer Howard	3,828	46.97	−10.67	$25.968.04
Liberal	Paul Hesse	2,488	30.53	13.56	$23,866.84
Progressive Conservative	Christine Waddell	1,202	14.75	−4.97	$11,369.89
Green	Gerald H. Enns	511	6.27	1.30	$905.51
Independent	Ron Nash	92	1.13	–	$261.98
Communist	Frank Komarniski	29	0.36	–	
Total valid votes		8,150	–	–	
Rejected		53	–		
Eligible voters / turnout		13,169	62.29	7.64	
Source(s) Source: Manitoba. Chief Electoral Officer (2007). Statement of Votes for the 39th Provincial General Election, May 22, 2007 (PDF) (Report). Winnipeg: Elections Manitoba.

1997 Canadian federal election: Brandon—Souris
Party	Candidate	Votes	%	±%	Expenditures
Progressive Conservative	Rick Borotsik	13,216	35.59	+13.18	$51,629
Reform	Ed Agnew	11,883	32.00	+1.63	$52,341
Liberal	Glen McKinnon	6,583	17.73	-15.27	$33,249
New Democratic	Jennifer Howard	4,983	13.42	+1.56	$12,213
Independent	Geoff Gorf Borden	244	0.66		$19
Christian Heritage	Colin Atkins	229	0.62	-0.3	$34
Total valid votes		37,138	100.00		
Total rejected ballots		135			
Turnout		37,273	66.88		
Electors on the lists		55,735			
Sources: Official Results, Elections Canada and Financial Returns, Elections Canada.
