= Seine River (electoral district) =

Provincial electoral district in Manitoba, Canada

Coordinates: 49.787°N 97.090°W

Manitoba electoral district
- Location in Winnipeg

Provincial electoral district
- Legislature: Legislative Assembly of Manitoba
MLA
Billie Cross
New Democratic
- District created: 1989
- First contested: 1990
- Last contested: 2023

Seine River (French: Rivière-Seine) is a provincial electoral district of Manitoba, Canada. It was created by redistribution in 1989, and has formally existed since the 1990 provincial election. The constituency is located in the southern section of the city of Winnipeg.

Seine River is bordered to the south and east by the rural riding of Dawson Trail, to the north by Southdale and Riel, and to the west by St. Norbert. The riding is mostly urban, although it also includes some rural space.

The riding's population in 1996 was 18,833. In 1999, the average family income was $63,800, and the unemployment rate was 4.20%. Seine River's francophone population is 9%, and there is also a significant German community (4%). Health and social services account for 14% of the riding's industry.

== Members of the Legislative Assembly ==
This riding has elected the following MLAs:

Parliament	Years	Member	Party
Riding created from Niakwa and Riel
32nd	1990–1995	Louise Dacquay	Progressive Conservative
33rd	1995–1999	Louise Dacquay	Progressive Conservative
34th	1999–2003	Louise Dacquay	Progressive Conservative
35th	2003–2007	Theresa Oswald	New Democratic
36th	2007–2011	Theresa Oswald	New Democratic
37th	2011–2016	Theresa Oswald	New Democratic
38th	2016–2019	Janice Morley-Lecomte	Progressive Conservative
39th	2019–2023	Janice Morley-Lecomte	Progressive Conservative
40th	2023–present	Billie Cross	New Democratic

== Electoral results ==
2023 Manitoba general election
Party	Candidate	Votes	%	±%	Expenditures
New Democratic	Billie Cross	5,381	52.08	+26.07	$31,139.94
Progressive Conservative	Janice Morley-Lecomte	3,974	38.46	-6.58	$39,828.20
Liberal	James Bloomfield	846	8.19	-13.97	$0.00
Independent	Martin J. Stadler	131	1.27	–	$1,388.96
Total valid votes/expense limit		10,332	99.64	–	$63,492.00
Total rejected and declined ballots		37	0.36	–	
Turnout		10,369	63.64	+1.52	
Eligible voters		16,293			
Source(s) Source: Elections Manitoba
New Democratic gain from Progressive Conservative		Swing		+16.32	

2019 Manitoba general election
Party	Candidate	Votes	%	±%	Expenditures
Progressive Conservative	Janice Morley-Lecomte	4,372	45.04	-8.24	$33,665.77
New Democratic	Durdana Islam	2,525	26.01	+2.88	$12,437.08
Liberal	James Bloomfield	2,151	22.16	-1.42	$12,202.10
Green	Bryanne Lamoureux	659	6.79	New	$0.00
Total valid votes		9,707	99.45		
Total rejected ballots		54	0.55		
Turnout		9,761	62.12		
Eligible voters		15,712			

2016 Manitoba general election
Party	Candidate	Votes	%	±%	Expenditures
Progressive Conservative	Janice Morley-Lecomte	5,396	53.28	+9.35	$45,124.99
Liberal	Peter Chura	2,388	23.58	+20.74	$9,466.12
New Democratic	Lise Pinkos	2,343	23.13	-29.75	$21,504.71
Total valid votes/expense limit		10,127	100.0		$47,949.00
Total rejected ballots		177	–	–	
Turnout		10,304	66.80	–	
Eligible voters		15,424			
Source: Elections Manitoba

2011 Manitoba general election
Party	Candidate	Votes	%	±%	Expenditures
New Democratic	Theresa Oswald	5,500	52.88	−4.01	$26,190.15
Progressive Conservative	Gord Steeves	4,569	43.93	+11.73	$30,207.87
Liberal	Troy Osiname	295	2.84	−8.04	$1,577.80
Total valid votes		10,364			
Rejected and declined ballots		36			
Turnout		10,400	70.82		
Electors on the lists		14,686			
Source: Elections Manitoba

2007 Manitoba general election
Party	Candidate	Votes	%	±%	Expenditures
New Democratic	Theresa Oswald	5,786	56.89	+5.83	$27,615.58
Progressive Conservative	Steve Andjelic	3,275	32.20	-10.20	$31,015.94
Liberal	Jennifer Lukovich	1,111	10.88	+4.33	$4,915.77
Total valid votes		10,172	100.00		
Rejected and declined ballots		41			
Turnout		10,213	63.35		
Electors on the lists		16,147			
Source: Elections Manitoba

2003 Manitoba general election
Party	Candidate	Votes	%	±%	Expenditures
New Democratic	Theresa Oswald	4,314	51.06	+15.72	$25,157.95
Progressive Conservative	Louise Dacquay	3,582	42.40	-5.38	$16,327.06
Liberal	Luciano Vacca	553	6.55	-8.68	$2,583.50
Total valid votes		8,489	100.0		
Total rejected ballots		20	–	–	
Turnout		8,469	59.35	-14.77	
Eligible voters		14,270			

1999 Manitoba general election
Party	Candidate	Votes	%	±%	Expenditures
Progressive Conservative	Louise Dacquay	4,684	47.78	-1.92	$27,151.56
New Democratic	Leslie Fingler	3,464	35.34	+18.70	$6,241.00
Liberal	Jake Pankratz	1,493	15.23	-18.43	$19,063.41
Manitoba	Warren Goodwin	129	1.32	n/a	$2,030.38
Total valid votes		9,770	99.66		
Rejected and declined ballots		33			
Turnout		9,803	74.12		
Electors on the lists		13,225			
Progressive Conservative hold		Swing		-10.31	
Source: Elections Manitoba

1995 Manitoba general election
Party	Candidate	Votes	%	±%
Progressive Conservative	Louise Dacquay	6,462	49.70	+8.98
Liberal	Bobbi Éthier	4,376	33.66	-6.64
New Democratic	Wilson Ho	2,163	16.64	+0.30
Turnout		13,062	74.53	
Electors on the lists		17,525		
Progressive Conservative hold		Swing		+7.81
Source: Elections Manitoba

1990 Manitoba general election
Party	Candidate	Votes	%
Progressive Conservative	Louise Dacquay	4,465	40.72
Liberal	Herold Driedger	4,418	40.30
New Democratic	Keith Kendall	1,792	16.34
Western Independence	Lyle Cruickshank	289	2.64
Turnout		10,995	72.89
Electors on the lists		15,084	
Source: Elections Manitoba

== Previous boundaries ==
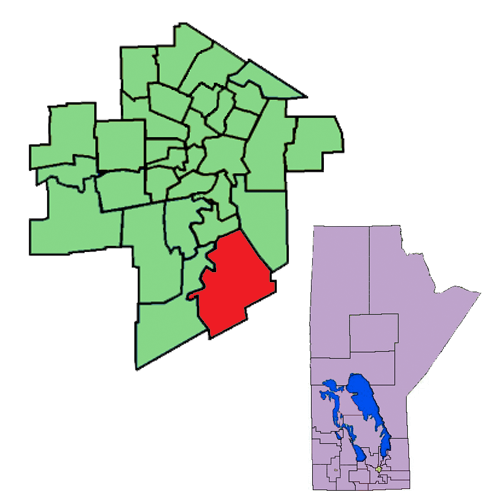
The 1999–2011 boundaries for Seine River highlighted in red.

== See also ==
- List of Manitoba provincial electoral districts
- Canadian provincial electoral districts
