= Tim Sale (politician) =

Canadian politician (born 1942)

The Reverend Tim Sale

Manitoba Minister of Health
- In office October 12, 2004 – September 21, 2006
- Premier: Gary Doer
- Preceded by: Dave Chomiak
- Succeeded by: Theresa Oswald

Manitoba Minister of Energy, Science and Technology
- In office September 25, 2002 – October 12, 2004
- Premier: Gary Doer

Manitoba Minister of Family Services and Housing
- In office September 25, 2002 – October 12, 2004
- Premier: Gary Doer
- Preceded by: new portfolio
- Succeeded by: Drew Caldwell

Member of the Legislative Assembly of Manitoba for Fort Rouge Crescentwood (1995–1999)
- In office September 21, 1999 – May 22, 2007
- Preceded by: new constituency
- Succeeded by: Jennifer Howard
- In office April 25, 1995 – September 21, 1999
- Preceded by: Avis Gray
- Succeeded by: constituency abolished

Manitoba Assistant Deputy Minister of Education
- In office 1987–1989

Chief Executive Officer of the Social Planning Council of Winnipeg
- In office 1976–1985

Trustee of the Fort Garry School Division
- In office 1971–1977

Personal details
- Born: February 5, 1942 (age 84) Goderich, Ontario
- Party: New Democratic Party
- Education: Trinity College, Toronto

Edward Timothy Sale (born February 5, 1942) is a former Manitoba politician who served as a member of the Premier Gary Doer's cabinet.

== Biography ==
The son of Edward Sale and Grace Watson, he was born in Goderich, Ontario, in 1942. He received Bachelor of Science and Bachelor of Theology degrees from the University of Trinity College, and was subsequently ordained as an Anglican priest.

Sale moved to Manitoba after his graduation and joined a team ministry at St. Paul's Anglican Church in Fort Garry from 1966 to 1969, and has been an honorary assistant in this parish since 1976. Later he worked with the United Church of Canada and then became executive director of the Social Planning Council of Winnipeg. In the early 1990s, he taught at the University of Manitoba in the Department of Economics and the Faculty of Continuing Education. He also served as a Fort Garry school trustee from 1971 to 1977, spent eight years on the board of the United Way in Winnipeg, and was chief executive officer of Winnipeg's Social Planning Council from 1976 to 1985.

Sale was a senior policy analyst for the provincial Ministry of Finance from 1985 to 1987, and served as Assistant Deputy Minister of Education from 1987 to 1989.

Sale was originally aligned with the Liberal Party of Canada, and there were some in the New Democratic Party of Manitoba who objected to his appointment as an assistant deputy minister for this reason. After being fired by Gary Filmon's Tories, Sale's political views shifted to the left. In 1991, he helped to found CHO!CES, a social activist group which opposed Filmon's government. He also ran for the NDP in the central Winnipeg riding of Crescentwood in a 1992 by-election, and came within 400 votes of winning.

Sale ran again for Crescentwood in the 1995 provincial election, this time winning in a close three-way contest. He became one of the most vocal members of the NDP opposition, and served as the party's critic for Industry, Trade and Tourism. Sale also played a leading role in exposing a vote-manipulation scandal involving the Independent Native Voice party and some senior advisors in Gary Filmon's government.

The New Democrats under Gary Doer won the general election of 1999, and Sale was easily re-elected in the redistributed riding of Fort Rouge. He was appointed Minister of Family Services and Housing with responsibility for persons with disabilities in Doer's first cabinet, and was transferred to the new portfolio of Science, Energy and Technology with responsibility for the Gaming Control Act and Manitoba Hydro on September 25, 2002. In the latter capacity, Sale has been a leading proponent of the environmental reforms outlined in the Kyoto Protocol. He was also the first Minister of Healthy Child Manitoba, which leads the Province's early childhood development strategy. Sale was easily re-elected in the provincial election of 2003, defeating his closest opponent by over 2700 votes. On October 12, 2004, he was appointed as Manitoba's Minister of Health, and led efforts to shorten waiting lists and strengthen primary health care.

In 2007, Sale retired and did not seek re-election. In 2008 he was awarded an honorary doctorate by St. John's College of the University of Manitoba in recognition of his work for social justice.

Sale criticized Manitoba Hydro in 2014 for failing to pursue the development of wind power for the province.
