= Municipal elections in Winnipeg =

Election results for the position of mayor, in Winnipeg, Manitoba, Canada.

== 1952 mayoral election ==
This election was held via instant-runoff voting.

First count:

Party	Candidate	Votes	%	±%
Citizen's Election Committee	(incumbent)Garnet Coulter	37,877	43.45	
Independent	Stephen Juba	27,725	31.80	
Co-operative Commonwealth Federation	Donovan Swailes	21,578	24.75	
Total valid votes		87,180	100.00	

Swailes was eliminated, and his 21,578 votes were distributed as follows: Coulter 7,138, Juba 5,718. 8,722 votes were non-transferable.

Second count:

Party	Candidate	Votes	%
Citizen's Election Committee	(incumbent)Garnet Coulter	45,015	51.63
Independent	Stephen Juba	33,443	38.36
Votes not transferred		8,722	10.00

== 1966 mayoral election ==
Last election before Unicity.

Candidate	Total votes	%
(incumbent)Stephen Juba	45,741	89.88
Gloria Queen-Hughes	5,149	10.12
Total valid votes	50,890	100.00

== 1971 mayoral election ==
Candidate	Total votes	%
(incumbent)Stephen Juba	139,147	69.68
Jack Willis	49,014	24.54
William Hutton	8,536	4.27
Gordon Anderson	2,765	1.38
Peter Shewchenko	230	0.12
Total valid votes/Turnout	199,719	60.7

== 1974 mayoral election ==
Candidate	Total votes	%
(incumbent)Stephen Juba	109,225	88.86
Brenda Dineen	6,174	5.02
Fred Cornish	3,969	3.23
Werner Goetze	2,151	1.75
Bernard Tesluk	1,399	1.14
Total valid votes/Turnout	122,918	34.9

== 1977 mayoral election ==
Candidate	Total votes	%
Robert Steen	69,818	47.47
Bill Norrie	67,999	46.23
Nick Ternette	5,682	3.86
Werner Goetze	1,969	1.34
John McDermid	1,614	1.10
Total valid votes/Turnout	147,082	40.1

== 1979 mayoral election ==
BY-ELECTION

Candidate	Total votes	%
Bill Norrie	101,299	75.82
Joe Zuken	24,650	18.45
Frank J. Syms	1,998	1.50
Alf Skowron	1,435	1.07
Don Gerrie	1,274	0.95
Phil Rizzuto	946	0.71
Harry Lazarenko	648	0.49
Ray Brunka	465	0.35
William Hawryluk	354	0.26
Joe Smith	226	0.17
William Gidzak	165	0.12
Alex Mitchell	148	0.11
Total valid votes/Turnout	133,608	36.4

== 1980 mayoral election ==
Candidate	Total votes	%
(incumbent)Bill Norrie	102,469	71.06
Allan Golden	37,116	25.74
William Hawryluk	3,321	2.30
Chris A. Swan	1,302	0.90
Total valid votes/Turnout	144,208	38.8

== 1983 mayoral election ==
Candidate	Total votes	%
(incumbent)Bill Norrie	154,513	75.16
Brian Corrin	40,073	19.49
William Hawryluk	6,489	3.16
Barry Vincent	2,258	1.10
Chris A. Swan	2,242	1.09
Total valid votes/Turnout	205,575	52.6

== 1986 mayoral election ==
Candidate	Total votes	%
(incumbent)Bill Norrie	78,996	55.48
Russell Doern	48,567	34.11
Peter Juba	4,955	3.48
Nick Ternette	3,060	2.15
William Hawryluk	1,737	1.22
Gilles Rivard	1,268	0.89
Allen Bleich	1,199	0.84
Garry Fast	1,137	0.80
Barry Kohn	898	0.63
Chris A. Swan	561	0.39
Total valid votes/Turnout	142,378	34.0

== 1989 mayoral election ==
Candidate	Total votes	%
(incumbent)Bill Norrie	100,689	71.03
Frank J. Syms	16,716	11.79
Nick Ternette	6,865	4.84
Conrad Santos	5,021	3.54
James W. Mille	3,243	2.29
James Bugera	2,697	1.90
Jean S. Veillet	2,225	1.57
Fred Debrecen	1,647	1.16
Walter Diawol	1,530	1.08
John Wynen	1,131	0.80
Total valid votes/Turnout	141,764	34.0

== 1992 mayoral election ==
Candidate	Total votes	%
Susan Thompson	89,743	39.01
Greg Selinger	75,123	32.66
Dave Brown	31,859	13.85
Ernie Gilroy	26,001	11.30
Natalie Pollock	1,311	0.57
Dan Zyluk	833	0.36
Darryl Soshycki	727	0.32
Walter Diawol	553	0.24
Menardo A. Caneda	534	0.23
Martin Barnes	526	0.23
James W. Miller	500	0.22
Bryan R. Benson	491	0.21
Bob McGugan	433	0.19
Charles-Alwyn Scotlend	421	0.18
Ed Hay	374	0.16
Aurel Joseph Prefontaine	348	0.15
Rudolph Parker	267	0.12
Total valid votes/Turnout	230,044	58.4

== 1995 mayoral election ==
1995 Winnipeg municipal election: Mayor of Winnipeg
Candidate	Votes	%
Susan Thompson	83,036	38.30
Peter Kaufmann	69,601	32.10
Terry Duguid	58,656	27.05
Nick Ternette	1,782	0.82
Theresa Ducharme	1,669	0.77
Natalie Pollock	1,079	0.50
Michael Grieger	1,007	0.46
Total valid votes	216,830	100.00

== 1998 mayoral election ==
1998 Winnipeg municipal election: Mayor of Winnipeg
Candidate	Votes	%
Glen Murray	112,078	50.55
Peter Kaufmann	101,509	45.78
Carlos Rule	1,894	0.85
Manny Does	1,886	0.85
Wally Welechenko	1,732	0.78
Nelson Morrison	1,425	0.64
Alex Reid	1,200	0.54
Total valid votes	221,724	100.00

== 2002 mayoral election ==
2002 Winnipeg municipal election: Mayor of Winnipeg
Candidate	Votes	%
(x)Glen Murray	103,457	50.63
Allan Golden	76,749	37.56
David Lettner	14,199	6.95
Chris Henderson	7,270	3.56
Nick Ternette	2,665	1.30
Total valid votes	204,340	100.00

== 2004 mayoral election ==
On June 22, 2004, a by-election was held to fill the position of mayor, vacant since Glen Murray's resignation on May 11, 2004. At the same time, by-elections were held for councillor in the River Heights-Fort Garry and St. Boniface wards, and for two school trustees.

Winnipeg municipal by-election, June 22, 2004: Mayor of Winnipeg
Candidate	Votes	%
Sam Katz	99,015	42.51
Dan Vandal	55,644	23.89
Allan Golden	34,562	14.84
MaryAnn Mihychuk	23,412	10.05
Garth Steek	16,497	7.08
Gordon Kirkby	1,986	0.85
Shirley Timm-Rudolph	801	0.34
Nelson P. Morrison	528	0.23
Natalie Pollock	453	0.19
Total valid votes	232,898	100.00

== 2006 mayoral election ==
2006 Winnipeg municipal election: Mayor of Winnipeg
Candidate	Votes	%
(x)Sam Katz	104,380	61.60
Marianne Cerilli	38,227	22.56
Kaj Hasselriis	22,401	13.22
Ron Pollock	4,444	2.62
Total valid votes	169,452	100.00

== 2010 mayoral election ==
Candidate	Total votes	%
(incumbent)Sam Katz	116,308	54.8
Judy Wasylycia-Leis	90,913	42.8
Brad Gross	3,398	1.68
Rav Gill	1,775	0.8

== 2014 mayoral election ==
2014 Winnipeg Mayoral
Candidate	Votes	%
Brian Bowman	111,504	47.54
Judy Wasylycia-Leis	58,440	24.29
Robert-Falcon Ouellette	36,823	15.70
Gord Steeves	21,080	8.99
David Sanders	3,718	1.59
Paula Havixbeck	2,083	0.89
Michel Fillion	898	0.38

== 2018 mayoral election ==
2018 Winnipeg Mayoral
Candidate	Votes	%
(incumbent) Brian Bowman	114,222	53.30
Jenny Motkaluk	76,554	35.72
Tim Diack	10,548	4.92
Don Woodstock	4,738	2.21
Doug Wilson	3,527	1.65
Umar Hayat	2,229	1.04
Ed Ackerman	1,697	0.79
Venkat Machiraju	788	0.37

== 2022 mayoral election ==
2022 Winnipeg Mayoral
Candidate	Votes	%
(incumbent) Scott Gillingham	53,663	27.54
Glen Murray	49,272	25.29
Kevin Klein	28,806	14.78
Shaun Loney	28,567	14.66
Robert-Falcon Ouellette	15,029	7.71
Jenny Motkaluk	7,443	3.82
Rana Bokhari	5,900	3.03
Rick Shone	2,570	1.32
Don Woodstock	1,889	0.97
Idris Adelakun	1,263	0.65
Chris Clacio	451	0.23

== See also ==
- List of municipal elections in Manitoba
