= 2021 Progressive Conservative Party of Manitoba leadership election =

Manitoba party election for party leader and premier

- October 30, 2021
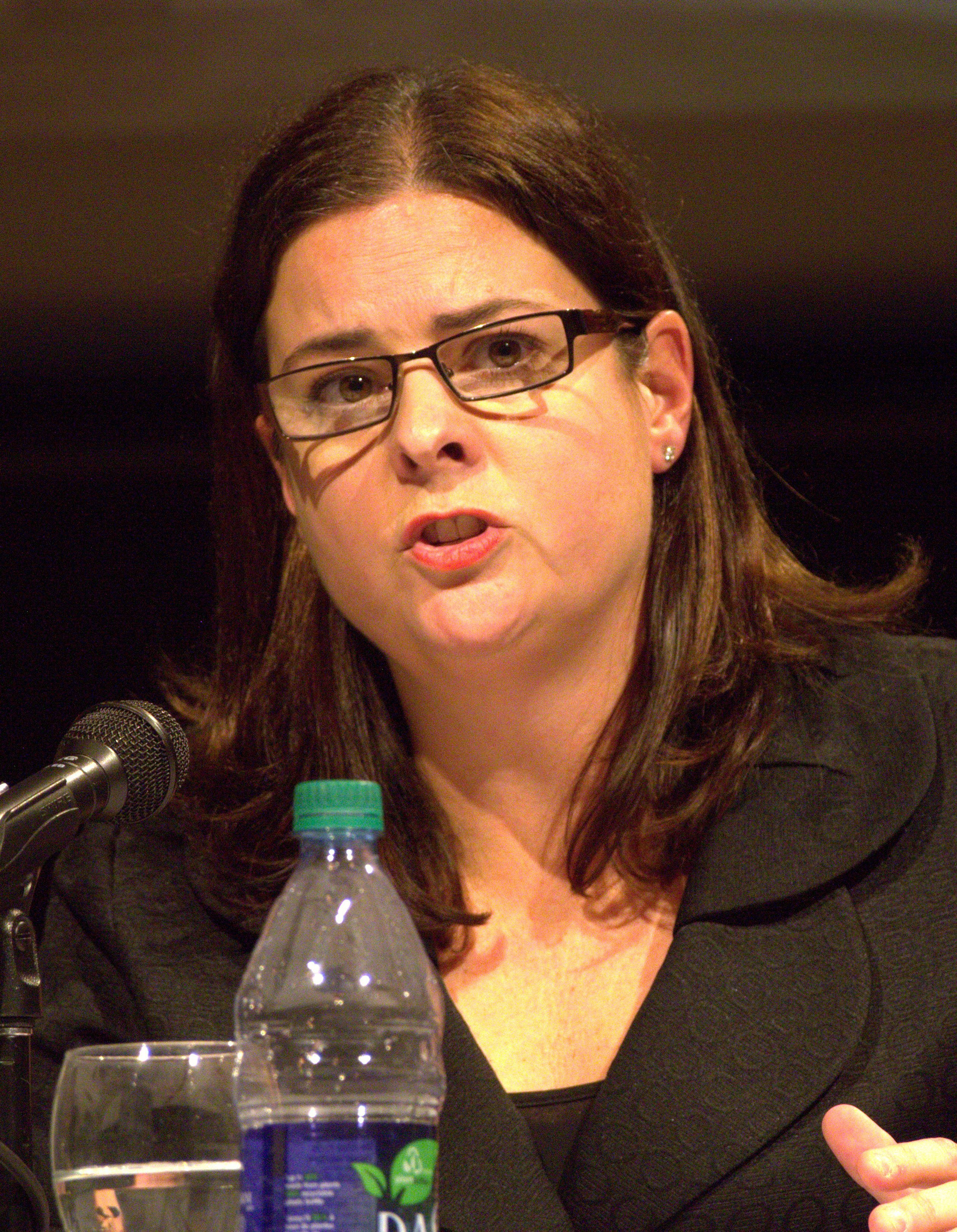

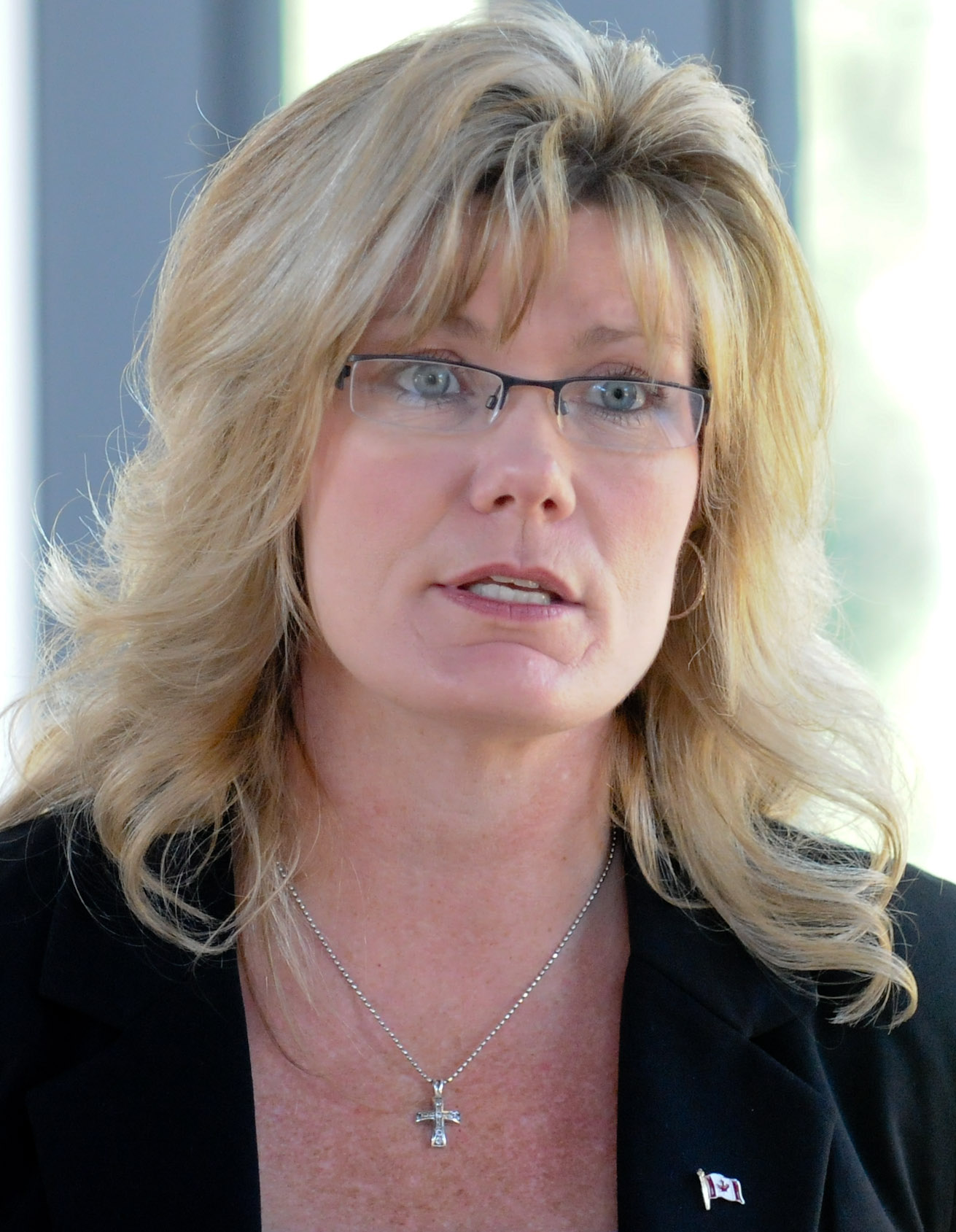
Candidate	Heather Stefanson	Shelly Glover
Popular vote	8,405	8,042
Percentage	51.1%	48.9%
Leader before election
Kelvin Goertzen (interim)
Elected Leader
Heather Stefanson

2021 Progressive Conservative Party of Manitoba leadership election
- Date: October 30, 2021
- Resigning leader: Brian Pallister
- Ballots: 1
- Candidates: 2
- Entrance fee: $25,000

The 2021 Progressive Conservative Party of Manitoba leadership election was held on October 30, 2021. The internal party election was called as a result of Premier Brian Pallister, the leader of the Progressive Conservative Party of Manitoba, announcing his resignation on August 10, 2021. As the Progressive Conservative Party had a majority in the Legislative Assembly of Manitoba, their new leader would automatically become the 24th premier of Manitoba.

The winner, Heather Stefanson, became the first female premier of Manitoba, on November 2, 2021, by virtue of winning the internal party election.

== Background ==
On August 10, 2021, Brian Pallister announced that he would not be seeking re-election in the next provincial election, although the exact date of his departure was not stated. Since the Progressive Conservatives held a majority in the Assembly, the new party leader would automatically become the premier of Manitoba.

The party's executive council decided the subsequent leadership convention would take place on October 30, 2021. Pallister declined to involve himself or his family in the election and stepped down as premier and party leader on September 1, ahead of the convention, to ensure there would not be allegations of him favouring anyone in the contest. Deputy premier Kelvin Goertzen was designated in a unanimous decision by the rest of the Progressive Conservative caucus to serve as interim party leader and thus premier until shortly after a new party leader was elected.

== Procedure ==
In order to be eligible to contest the election, a candidate had to pay an entry fee of $25,000, provide a petition for leadership signed by 50 party members, and sell new party memberships to 1000 new or recurring members. The election was held on a one member, one vote basis, with solely mail-in ballots under an instant-runoff voting system.

== Candidates ==
=== Shelly Glover ===
Shelly Glover had been the federal MP for Saint Boniface (2008–2015). In the government of Stephen Harper, she had been the minister of Canadian Heritage and Official Languages (2013–2015). Prior to entering politics, she was a member of the Winnipeg Police Service.

Candidacy announced: August 25, 2021

=== Heather Stefanson ===
Heather Stefanson is the MLA for Tuxedo (2000–2024). She had been the Deputy premier (2016–January 5, 2021) to Premier Pallister, but resigned the position on announcing her candidacy for the leadership. She had also been the Minister of Justice and Attorney General (2016–2018), the Minister of Families (2018–2021), and the Minister of Health and Seniors Care (January 5, 2021 – August 18, 2021). Prior to entering electoral politics, she worked in the office of Prime Minister Brian Mulroney, as an assistant to federal Agriculture Minister Charlie Mayer, and as an investment advisor for Wellington West Capital in Winnipeg from 1995 to 2000.

Candidacy announced: August 18, 2021

Endorsements

- MLAs: (26) Eileen Clarke (Agassiz), Cliff Cullen (Spruce Woods), Wayne Ewasko (Lac du Bonnet), Scott Fielding (Kirkfield Park), Cameron Friesen (Morden-Winkler), Audrey Gordon (Southdale), Josh Guenter (Borderland), Sarah Guillemard (Fort Richmond), Reg Helwer (Brandon West), Len Isleifson (Brandon East), Derek Johnson (Interlake), Scott Johnston (Assiniboia), Bob Lagassé (Dawson Trail), Alan Lagimodiere (Selkirk), Brad Michaleski (Dauphin), Andrew Micklefield (Rossmere), Janice Morley-Lecomte (Seine River), Doyle Piwniuk (Turtle Mountain), Jon Reyes (Waverley), Ron Schuler (Springfield-Ritchot), Andrew Smith (Lagimodière), Dennis Smook (La Verendrye), James Teitsma (Radisson), Jeff Wharton (Red River North), Ian Wishart (Portage la Prairie), Rick Wowchuk (Swan River)
- MPs: (3) Larry Maguire (Brandon—Souris), Marty Morantz (Charleswood—St. James—Assiniboia—Headingley), Dan Mazier (Dauphin—Swan River—Neepawa)
- Municipal politicians: (1) Jeff Browaty (Winnipeg City Councillor)
- Former MLAs: (13) Bob Banman (La Verendrye), Glen Cummings (Ste. Rose), Len Derkach (Russell), Jim Downey (Arthur), David Faurschou (Portage la Prairie), John Loewen (Fort Whyte), Bonnie Mitchelson (River East), Stuart Murray (Kirkfield Park), Mike Radcliffe (River Heights), Shirley Render (St. Vital), Leanne Rowat (Minnedosa), Mavis Taillieu (Morris), Rosemary Vodrey (Fort Garry)
- Former MPs: (3) Joyce Bateman (Winnipeg South Centre), Charlie Mayer (Lisgar—Marquette), Joy Smith (Kildonan—St. Paul)

=== Failed to qualify ===
==== Ken Lee ====
Ken Lee was the former chief financial officer of the party. He stated that he had designed the party's one member, one vote system for leadership elections. He positioned himself to the right flank of the other candidates, as an opponent of COVID-19 vaccine requirements. On September 17, 2021, the party announced that he had failed to qualify.

In October 2021, the Manitoba Elections Commissioner opened an investigation into a prominent supporter of Lee, who offered to pay people's memberships if they supported the candidate and promised interest-free 100-year loans. The opposition New Democratic Party had filed a complaint after the offer appeared on social media. The NDP stated that donations to a party leadership election count as political donations, and only individuals can make donations, using their own money.

Candidacy announced: September 16, 2021

Endorsements

- Organizations: People's Party of Canada

==== Shannon Martin ====
Shannon Martin was the MLA for McPhillips (2019–2023) and the former MLA for Morris (2014–2019). Prior to his election to the legislature, Martin was executive director of Reaching E-Quality Employment Services, a Winnipeg-based not-for-profit that assists persons with disabilities find employment. He was also provincial director of the Canadian Federation of Independent Business.

Candidacy announced: August 27, 2021 Martin failed to meet the party's entrance requirements.

=== Declined ===
- Candice Bergen – Interim Leader of the Conservative Party of Canada (February 2, 2022 – September 10, 2022), Deputy Leader of the Conservative Party of Canada (2019–2022), MP for Portage—Lisgar (2008–2023), federal Minister of State for Social Development (2013–2015)
- Cliff Cullen – Deputy Premier (2022–2023), MLA for Spruce Woods (2011–2023) and Turtle Mountain (2004–2011), Minister of Education (2021–2022), Minister of Economic Development, Investment and Trade (2022–2023)
- Scott Fielding – MLA for Kirkfield Park (2016–2022), Minister of Finance (2018–2022), Winnipeg City Councillor for St. James-Brooklands (2006–2014)
- Scott Gillingham – Winnipeg City Councillor for St. James (2018–2022) and St. James-Brooklands (2014–2018), Mayor of Winnipeg (2022–Present)
- Kelvin Goertzen – Interim PC leader and Premier (September 1, 2021 – November 2, 2021), MLA for Steinbach (2003–present), Deputy Premier (2021), Minister of Intergovernmental Affairs and Internal Relations (September 1, 2021 – November 2, 2021)
- Rochelle Squires – MLA for Riel (2016–2023), Deputy Premier (September 1, 2021 – November 3, 2021), Minister of Families (2021–2023)
- Jeff Wharton – MLA for Red River North (2019–present) and Gimli (2016–2019), Minister of Crown Services (2019–2022)
- James Bezan – MP for Selkirk—Interlake—Eastman (2015–present) and Selkirk—Interlake (2004–2015)
- Brian Bowman – Mayor of Winnipeg (2014–2022)

== Outcome ==
After the nomination period closed, the only two qualifying candidates were women, meaning Manitoba would soon have its first female premier.

The ballots were counted on October 30, 2021. Stefanson won a close race, taking 51 per cent of the vote: 8,405 votes of the votes cast were for Stefanson, 8,042 for Glover. Only 363 votes separated Stefanson from Glover.

== Aftermath ==
After the results were announced, Glover refused to concede, citing concerns of a close race and 1,200 missing mail-in ballots. The day after the election, a group of about 60 protesters gathered at the Progressive Conservative Party headquarters to protest an "unfair" election. Some protesters were upset about how the ballots were handled and worried about if their ballot had been counted, while others believed Glover was the real winner of the election.

On November 1, 2021, the Glover campaign sent a letter to Lieutenant Governor Janice Filmon, asking her to delay the swearing in of Stefanson as premier, claiming there were "substantial irregularities" in the result of the election. The Glover campaign stated they would seek an Order of the Court of Queen's Bench declaring that the results of the election invalid and that a new election should take place. The PC Party initially argued that the court did not have jurisdiction to review the situation, but on November 15, they agreed to grant the court jurisdiction over the case, due to "the nature of the allegations" and "the regrettable, divisive tone to the dispute". On December 17, the court dismissed Glover's challenge.
