= Scott Gillingham =

Mayor of Winnipeg since 2022

His Worship Scott Gillingham
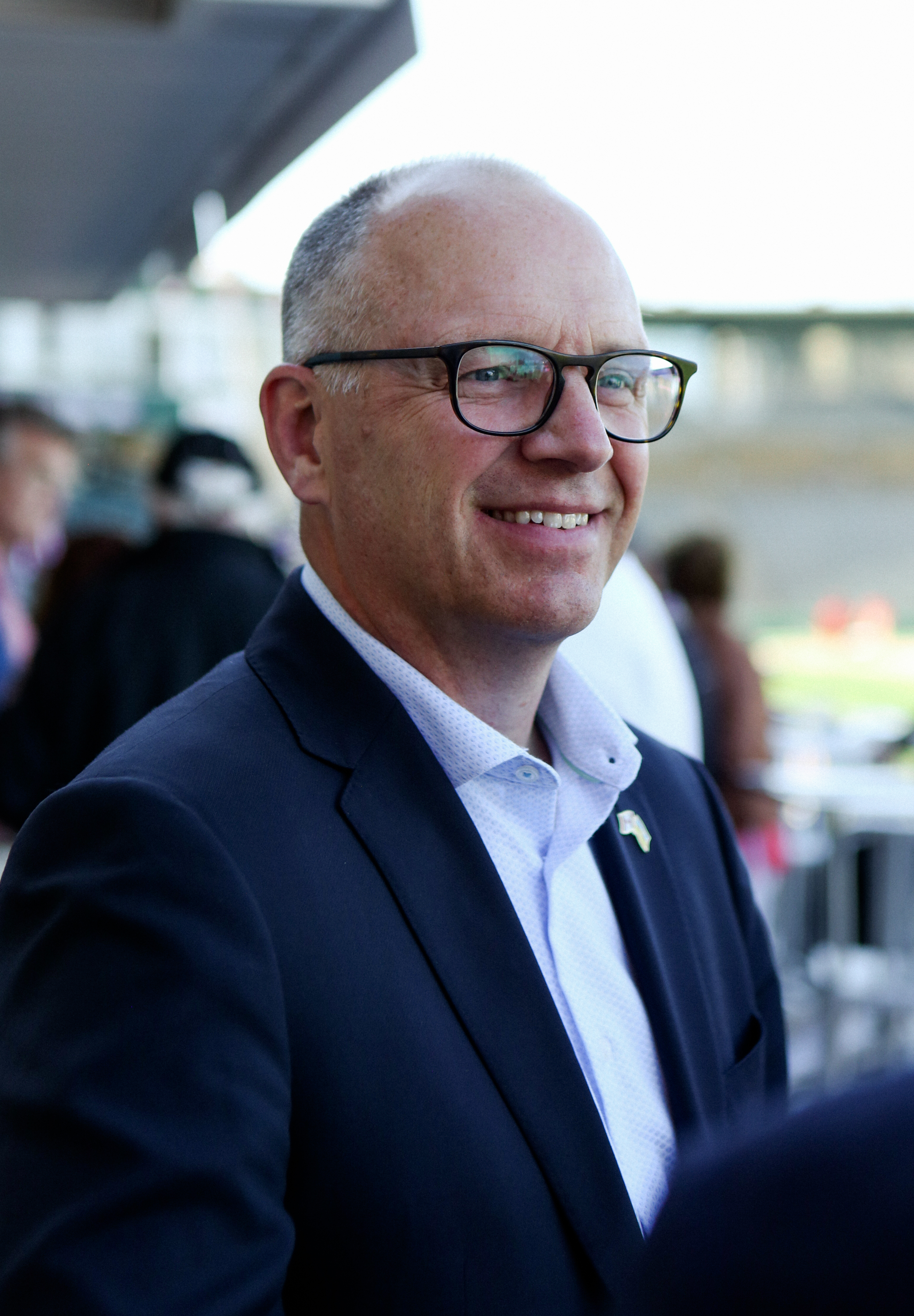
- Gillingham in 2022

44th Mayor of Winnipeg
- Incumbent
- Assumed office November 1, 2022
- Preceded by: Brian Bowman

Winnipeg City Councillor for St. James
- In office October 22, 2014 – October 26, 2022
- Preceded by: Scott Fielding
- Succeeded by: Shawn Dobson

Personal details
- Born: 1967 or 1968 (age 58–59) Brandon, Manitoba, Canada
- Party: Independent; Progressive Conservative (bef. 2011 – at least 2014)
- Education: Horizon College and Seminary; Canadian Mennonite University
- Occupation: Pastor

Scott Gillingham (born 1967 or 1968) is a Canadian politician who currently serves as the 44th mayor of Winnipeg, being elected on October 26, 2022. Before being elected as mayor, he was the city councillor for St. James from 2014 to 2022. He was sworn in as the mayor of Winnipeg on November 1, 2022.

== Biography ==
Gillingham was born in 1967 or 1968 in Brandon, Manitoba, and raised on a farm near Carman. He played hockey in his youth, including stints with the Steinbach Hawks, Dauphin Kings and Winkler Flyers of the Manitoba Junior Hockey League.

In his early 20s, Gillingham completed a diploma in pastoral theology at Horizon College and Seminary in Saskatoon and later graduate studies at Canadian Mennonite University in Winnipeg. He was a Pentecostal pastor before entering politics in 2014 as a member of the Winnipeg City Council. In 2021, he considered running in the 2021 Progressive Conservative Party of Manitoba leadership election, but decided not to, citing the party's timeline.

In 2022, he was elected mayor of Winnipeg. In October 2025, Gillingham, along with a security guard, helped save a person's life outside of Winnipeg's City Hall by administering a naloxone kit to an individual who was overdosing. In 2026, he was re-elected, defeating Kevin Klein.

== Electoral record ==
=== 2026 Winnipeg mayoral election ===
Candidate	Votes	%
Scott Gillingham	80,206	39.82
Kevin Klein	41,703	20.71
Noah Redden	39,962	19.84
Mike Vogiatzakis	19,463	9.66

=== 2022 Winnipeg mayoral election ===
Candidate	Votes	%
Scott Gillingham	53,663	27.54
Glen Murray	49,272	25.29
Kevin Klein	28,806	14.78
Shaun Loney	28,567	14.66
Robert-Falcon Ouellette	15,029	7.71
Jenny Motkaluk	7,443	3.82
Rana Bokhari	5,900	3.03
Rick Shone	2,570	1.32
Don Woodstock	1,889	0.97
Idris Adelakun	1,263	0.65
Chris Clacio	451	0.23

=== 2018 Winnipeg city council election ===
St. James
Candidate	Votes	%
Scott Gillingham (X)	9,130	55.43
Shawn Dobson (X)	5,740	34.85
Kurt Morton	1,601	9.72

=== 2014 Winnipeg city council election ===
St. James-Brooklands
Candidate	Votes	%
Scott Gillingham	5,174	43.69
Bryan Metcalfe	3,548	29.96
Stefan Jonasson	2,292	19.35
Fred Morris	828	6.99

=== Provincial ===
2011 Manitoba general election: St. James
Party	Candidate	Votes	%	±%	Expenditures
New Democratic	Deanne Crothers	4,432	49.61	−6.04	$25,563.25
Progressive Conservative	Scott Gillingham	3,414	38.21	+7.38	$31,468.19
Liberal	Gerard Allard	685	7.67	−0.96	$5,903.97
Green	Trevor Vandale	377	4.22	–	$205.40
Total valid votes		8,908			
Rejected and declined ballots		25			
Turnout		8,933	62.02	+2.82	
Electors on the lists		14,403			
