= 2026 Winnipeg municipal election =

2026 Winnipeg mayoral election
- October 28, 2026
- Turnout: 37.72%
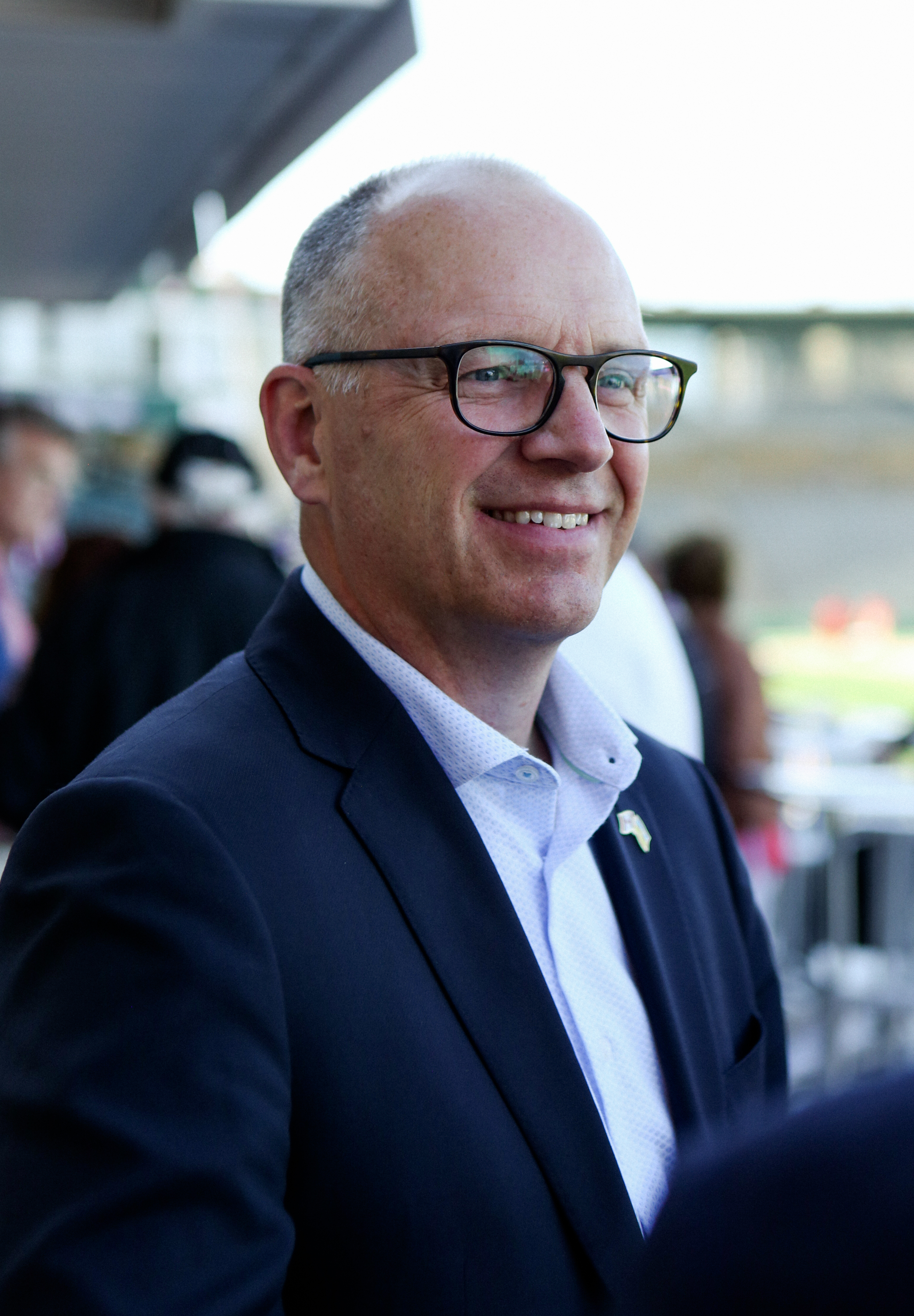
		KK
Candidate	Scott Gillingham	Kevin Klein
Popular vote	80,206	41,703
Percentage	39.82%	20.71%
	NR	MV
Candidate	Noah Redden	Mike Vogiatzakis
Popular vote	39,962	19,463
Percentage	19.84%	9.66%
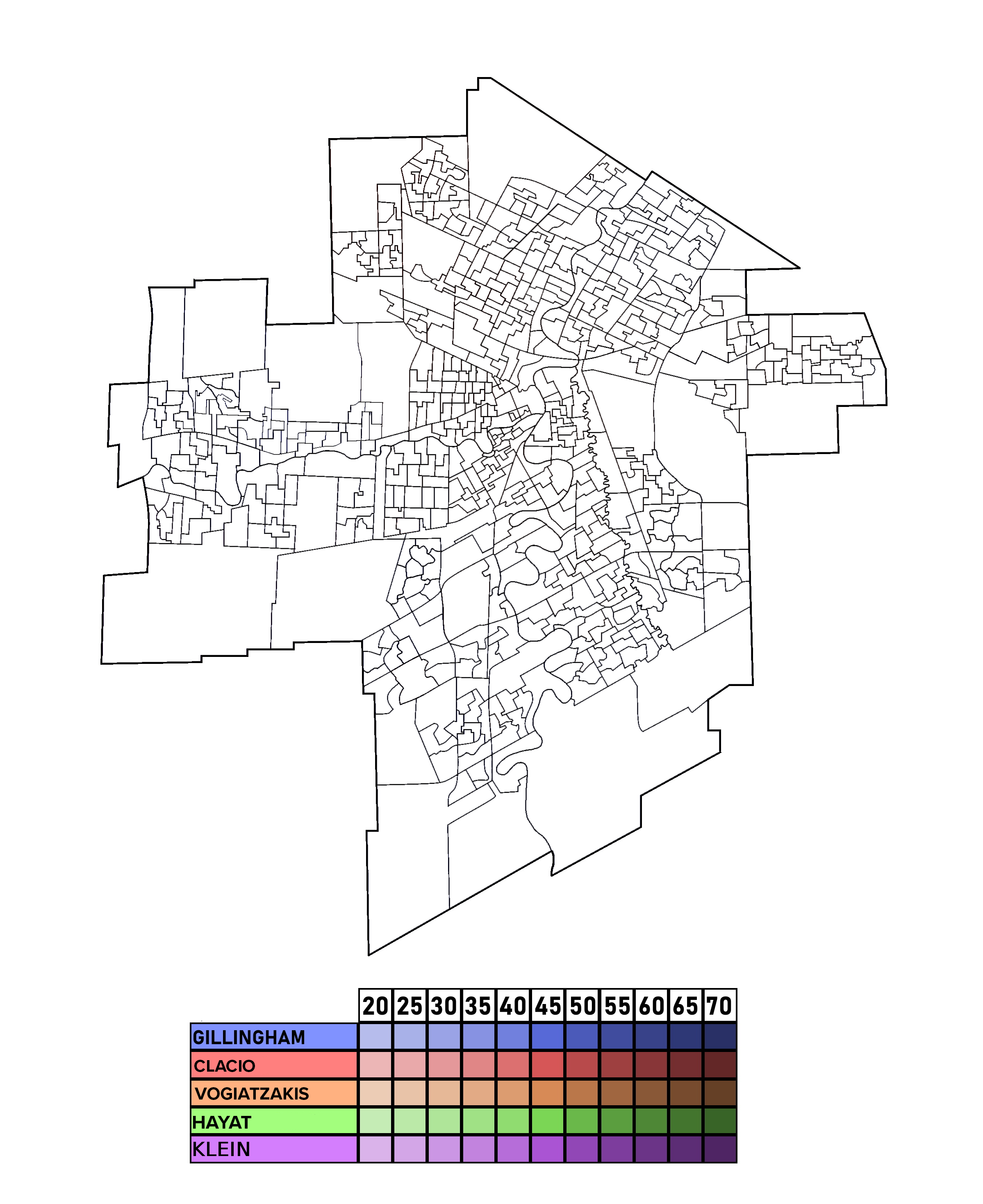
Mayor before election
Scott Gillingham
Mayor
Scott Gillingham

The 2026 Winnipeg municipal election took place on October 28, 2026. The offices of mayor, city councillors, and school trustees of the city of Winnipeg were elected as a result of this election. This election was part of municipal elections held across the province. The elections used the first-past-the-post voting election system, both to elect the mayor and to elect councillors in single-member wards. Scott Gillingham was re-elected to a second term as mayor after the election, with Kevin Klein and Noah Redden in second and third place respectively.

== Background ==
The deadline to register as a mayoral candidate was September 22, 2026, with seven candidates announced prior to May 28, 2026. Candidates for councillor and school trustee must wait until June 30, 2026, to register their campaigns. There will be four vacant spots on the city council come election day.

=== Mayoral election ===
Incumbent mayors have historically performed exceptionally strongly in Winnipeg. The last sitting mayor to suffer an election-night defeat in Winnipeg was in 1956.

Polling in the lead up to the election showed that addressing homelessness and addictions services as well as reducing crime were the issues voters cared about most. Improving public transit, improving downtown, and repairing roads and streets rounded out the top five issues Winnipeggers focused on when deciding their vote this cycle.

=== City Council Elections ===
There are 15 city council wards in Winnipeg with 9 of the current councillors saying they plan to run again. River Heights-Fort Garry Councillor John Orlikow says he plans to retire from Winnipeg's city council at the conclusion of his 6th term this fall. Janice Lukes of the Waverley West ward will also not run for reelection after completing three terms serving the council. She told reporters she felt she had accomplished what she had set out to do when she entered politics, including securing a new recreation centre for her ward. St. Vital's Brian Mayes will also not seek reelection after nearly 15 years representing his ward. He cited issues working with Mayor Gillingham as a reason for his departure. Councillor Sherri Rollins, who originally filed paperwork to run again in the Fort Rouge-East Fort Garry ward, later withdrew also citing frustrations working with the mayors office. St. Norbert-Seine River ward councillor Markus Chambers will also not run for reelection citing personal and family health reasons.

Councillor Russ Wyatt was the last incumbent to confirm he is running for reelection on the city council. Wyatt has been charged with sexual assault for two separate incidents and has continued to attend council meetings since the charges were filed while maintaining his innocence. After the election, the provincial government of Manitoba has signalled it may change laws to allow municipalities to suspend city council members when facing serious charges in the future.

=== Changes to voting ===
The 2026 municipal election in Winnipeg featured some new technology for voters and poll workers. As of the end of April 2026, 527,412 Winnipeggers were on the city's voter list, and this number is expected to grow with an online system for voters to check their registration status prior to election day. On election day itself, the city has replaced its remaining paper voter-registration records with digital poll books. These digital books allow election workers to instantly discern whether anyone is eligible to vote and make the process faster for everyone. The digital books will also allow more flexibility for voters to vote at any location within their ward that is most convenient to them.

There are also changes to candidates, specifically rules for school trustee positions. Candidates for school trustee positions on Winnipeg-area school boards must now register their campaigns. This change in rules will ensure candidates are subject to limits on how much money they can raise or spend.

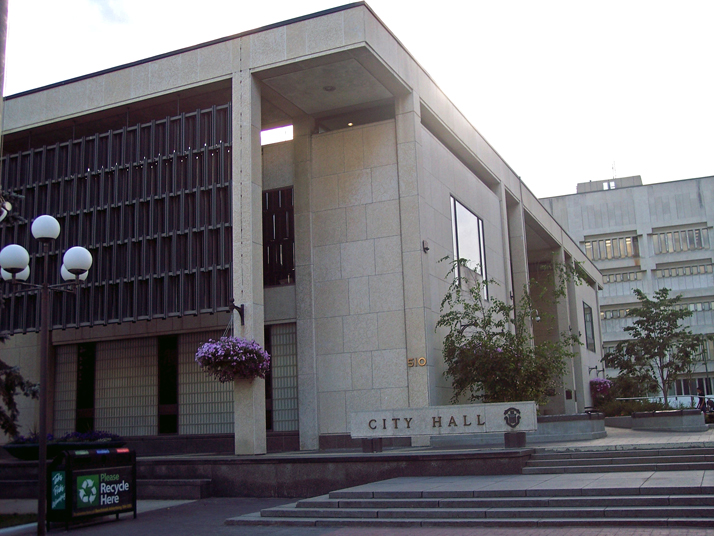
Winnipeg City Hall

== Mayoral election ==
=== Candidates ===
Candidate	Information	Announced
Scott Gillingham	Mayor of Winnipeg (2022–present); St. James Ward Councillor (2014–2022)	May 1, 2026
Joshua Pagdato	Operator of a community group called Protect the Kids Canada, centred around youth advocacy.	May 23, 2026
Mazher Alam	Mazher is a newcomer to Winnipeg politics, campaigning on fixing potholes, halting property-tax increases and reversing water rate hikes.	May 21, 2026
Umar Hayat	Real estate agent in Winnipeg. Umar ran for Mayor in 2018 and ran for the Manitoba Liberal Party in 2023 in the riding of McPhillips.	May 13, 2026
Mike Vogiatzakis	Funeral director and director of Voyage Funeral Homes and Crematorium. Vogiatzakis also registered to run for mayor in 2014 but did not end up on the ballot.	May 7, 2026
Christopher Clacio	Christopher is a grocery clerk who also ran in 2022. Clacio describes himself as a progressive candidate.	May 1, 2026
Don Woodstock	Founder of a business called JamRock Security. This is Don's third campaign for mayor in Winnipeg. He finished fourth in 2018 and ninth in 2022.	May 21, 2026
Johnny Calderon	Johnny Calderon is an online content creator, comedian, and entertainer.	
Noah Redden	Software developer. Endorsed candidate of former Mayor Glen Murray.	
Zachary Uminski	Electrician	
Brad Gross	Realtor, former mayoral candidate in 2010. Pledging to end investments in bike lanes and add security cameras to bus shelters.	
Kevin Klein	Minister of Environment and Climate (2023); MLA for Kirkfield Park (2022–2023); Charleswood-Tuxedo-Westwood Councillor (2018–2022)	September 1, 2026

=== Opinion polls ===
Polling firm	Link	Last date of polling	Alam	Calderon	Clacio	Gillingham	Gross	Hayat	Klein	Redden	Vogiatzakis	Woodstock	Margin of error	Sample size	Lead
Probe		September 14, 2026	<1%	2%	1%	55%	1%	1%	23%	4%	11%	1%	n/a (Note: Margin of error cannot be calculated for non-probability based surveys.)	600	32%
Probe		October 22, 2026	1%	7%	1%	36%	1%	4%	19%	14%	14%	2%	n/a	685	17%

=== Results ===
Mayoral candidate	Vote	%
Scott Gillingham (X)	80,206	39.82
Kevin Klein	41,703	20.71
Noah Redden	39,962	19.84
Mike Vogiatzakis	19,463	9.66
Tracey Drexler	4,749	2.36
Johnny Calderon	4,077	2.02
Don Woodstock	4,066	2.02
Chris Clacio	2,057	1.02
Joshua Pagdato	1,822	0.90
Brad Gross	1,497	0.74
Umar Hayat	1,159	0.58
Mazher Alam	650	0.32

== City Council elections ==
=== Incumbents not standing for re-election ===
- John Orlikow, River Heights-Fort Garry
- Janice Lukes, Waverley West
- Brian Mayes, St. Vital
- Sherri Rollins, Fort Rouge-East Fort Garry
- Markus Chambers, St. Norbert-Seine River

Ward	Candidates
Charleswood-Tuxedo-Westwood	Evan Duncan; Dennis Bayomi
Daniel McIntyre	Fred Morris; Cindy Gilroy
Elmwood-East Kildonan	Adam Dudek; Jessica Wiebe; Emma Durand-Wood; Chris Sweryda; Abel Gutierrez
Fort Rouge-East Fort Garry	Carson Mauthe; Kevin Stuart; Jeff Palmer; Brook Jones
Mynarski	Harold Brazil; Ross Eadie; Ayaz Noor Mohammed; Natalie Smith; Laurie Kozak; Terry Wachniak
North Kildonan	Orvie Dingwall, Tyler Andersen, Jeff Browaty
Old Kildonan	Greg McFarlane; Devi Sharma; Love Randhawa
Point Douglas	Vivian Santos; Mark Requinta
River Heights-Fort Garry	Sara MacArthur; Jorge Requena Ramos; Georgina Sabesky
St. Boniface	Sylvie Schmitt; Robyn Vilde; Nicholas Douklias; Matt Allard
St. James	Shawn Dobson; Tyler Crichton; Kelly Ryback
St. Norbert-Seine River	Ray DuBois; Anita Roy; Louise May; Govind Thawani
St. Vital	Doug Reimer; Season Kirkwood; Chris Sigurdson
Transcona	Russ Wyatt; Lora Meseman; Chris Giesbrecht; Nathine Dagdick; Shawn Nason
Waverley West	Uche Nwankwo; Jasmine Brar; Antar Banik; Nafiya Naso; Yuanchao Li

=== Ward results ===
Charleswood–Tuxedo–Westwood
Candidate	Votes	%
Evan Duncan (X)	14,509	83.99
Dennis Bayomi	2,765	16.01

Daniel McIntyre
Candidate	Votes	%
Cindy Gilroy (X)	8,287	82.39
Fred Morris	1,771	17.61

Elmwood–East Kildonan
Candidate	Votes	%
Emma Durand–Wood (X)	3,681	39.29
Chris Sweryda	2,145	22.90
Abel Gutierrez	1,804	19.26
Jessica Wiebe	926	9.88
Adam Dudek	812	8.67

Fort Rouge–East Fort Garry
Candidate	Votes	%
Jeff Palmer	7,821	60.76
Brook Jones	1,955	15.19
Carson Mauthe	1,567	12.17
Kevin Stuart	1,530	11.89

Mynarski
Candidate	Votes	%
Natalie Smith	3,056	30.69
Ross Eadie (X)	2,923	29.45
Harold Brazil	2,457	24.67
Laurie Kozak	1,063	10.67
Terry Wachniak	310	3.11
Ayaz Noor–Mohammed	140	1.41

North Kildonan
Candidate	Votes	%
Jeff Browaty (X)	7,356	48.74
Orvie Dingwall	5,813	38.52
Tyler Anderson	1,922	12.74

Old Kildonan
Candidate	Votes	%
Greg McFarlane	6,694	56.69
Devi Sharma (X)	4,268	36.14
Love Randhawa	846	7.16

Point Douglas
Candidate	Votes	%
Vivian Santos (X)	5,287	63.20
Mark Requinta	3,079	36.80

River Heights–Fort Garry
Candidate	Votes	%
Sara MacArthur	10,958	63.45
Georgina Sabesky	4,287	24.82
Jorge Requena Ramos	2,026	11.73

St. Boniface
Candidate	Votes	%
Matt Allard (X)	6,388	43.38
Nicholas Douklias	3,805	25.84
Sylvie Schmitt	3,343	22.70
Robyn Vilde	1,191	8.09

St James
Candidate	Votes	%
Kelly Ryback	6,485	43.74
Tyler Crichton	4,647	31.34
Shawn Dobson (X)	3,694	24.92

St. Norbert–Seine River
Candidate	Votes	%
Ray DuBois	8,790	61.74
Louise May	3,461	24.31
Anita Roy	1,820	12.78
Govind Thawani	167	1.17

St. Vital
Candidate	Votes	%
Chris Sigurdson	9,024	59.01
Doug Reimer	3,968	25.95
Season Kirkwood	2,300	15.04

Transcona
Candidate	Votes	%
Lora Meseman	4,564	31.80
Shawn Nason	4,104	28.59
Chris Giesbrecht	3,511	24.46
Russ Wyatt (X)	1,567	10.92
Nathine Dagdick	608	4.24

Waverley West
Candidate	Votes	%
Jasmine Brar	5,354	41.22
Nafiya Naso	4,327	33.31
Uche Nwankwo	2,067	15.91
Yuanchao Li	830	6.39
Antar Banik	412	3.17

== School trustee elections ==
The city of Winnipeg also runs elections to elect school trustees for school divisions within Winnipeg; these school divisions are Louis Riel School Division, Pembina Trails School Division, River East Transcona School Division, St. James – Assiniboia School Division, Seven Oaks School Division, and Winnipeg School Division. Each school division is divided into a certain number of wards, and there may be more than one candidate elected to the Office of School Trustee for each ward.

School division	Ward	Candidates
Louis Riel School Division	Ward 1	Ina Prokipchuk; Anna Weier; Moe Koroma; Ian Walker
Louis Riel School Division	Ward 2	Brian Mayes; Lauren Lambert; Irene Nordheim
Louis Riel School Division	Ward 3	Peter Bjornson; Ben Singer; Sandy Nemeth; Ryan Palmquist
Louis Riel School Division	Ward 4	Bethany Kolisniak; Jocelyn Greenwood; John Baert; Chipalo Simunyola
Pembina Trails School Division	Ward 1	Linda Karn; Sharon Esau; Samantha Pope; Terri MacLeod; Janet Belluk; Craig Stahlke
Pembina Trails School Division	Ward 2	Tim Johnson (acclaimed); Lauralee Gooding (acclaimed); Christine Jolly (acclaimed)
Pembina Trails School Division	Ward 3	Noman Zaheer; Carrissa Reyes; Towela Mkanda; Asim Nawaz; Alicia Becker; Cindy Nachtigall; Eric Labaupa; Tasneem Vali; Heethy Maan; Patricia Eyamba; Veerpal Sandhu; Tony Guan
River East Transcona School Division	Ward 1	Adam Burkowski; Susan Bywater; Ryan Frick; Jerry Sodomlak; Colleen Carswell
River East Transcona School Division	Ward 2	Manjot Kang; Idunnu Tokurah; Sheri Hanson
River East Transcona School Division	Ward 3	Lorlie Froese; Lindsay Fritzsche; Brian Hooper; Garry Kowalski; Brianne Goertzen
River East Transcona School Division	Ward 4	Peter Kotyk; Michelle Kowalchuk; Timothy Giesbrecht; Joe Hilmerich; Chloe Wowryk Bakker; Pamela Jansen; Brenda Bage; Susan Olynik; Jenn Kiziak
Seven Oaks School Division	Ward 2	Jagjit Khattra; Manpreet Toor; Leila Castro; Rob Bilsland; Sandeep Bhatti; Derek Dabee; Ernesto Ofiaza; Dirk Leavesley
Seven Oaks School Division	Ward 3	Evan Krosney; Lisa Brooks; Edward Ploszay; Mary-Jane Napolitano; Richard Sawka; Danica Vicovac; Teresa Jaworski
St. James–Assiniboia School Division	Centre	Ganesh Tailor; Pierre Attallah; Michael Cabral; Craig Johnson; Craig McGregor
St. James–Assiniboia School Division	East	Pradeev Sockalingam; Tara Smith; Vicki Rempel; Holly Hunter
St. James–Assiniboia School Division	West	Sandy Lethbridge (acclaimed); Cheryl Smukowich (acclaimed); Fiona Shiells (acclaimed)
Winnipeg School Division	Ward 1	Katrina Tessier (acclaimed)
Winnipeg School Division	Ward 2	Chris Brown; Jennifer Claydon; Andrew Kohan; Michael Thompson
Winnipeg School Division	Ward 3	Kathy Heppner (acclaimed)
Winnipeg School Division	Ward 4	Linda Hathout; Jamie Bonner; Lionel Lien
Winnipeg School Division	Ward 5	Reid Pereira (acclaimed)
Winnipeg School Division	Ward 6	Dante Aviso (acclaimed)
Winnipeg School Division	Ward 7	Tamara Kuly (acclaimed)
Winnipeg School Division	Ward 8	Leah Mason; Prabhnoor Singh; Sonia Becenko; Michael Block; Patrick Allard; Ewa Romolo
Winnipeg School Division	Ward 9	Ann Evangelista; Linda Schatkowsky

=== Trustee Results ===
Louis Riel School Division Ward 1 (Elect 2)
Candidate	Votes	%
Ian Walker	5,700	
Anna Weier	5,574	
Ina Prokipchuk	3,275	
Moe Koroma	1,318	

Louis Riel School Division Ward 2 (Elect 2)
Candidate	Votes	%
Brian Mayes	6,990	
Irene Nordheim	3,940	
Lauren Lambert	3,347	

Louis Riel School Division Ward 3 (Elect 3)
Candidate	Votes	%
Sandy Nemeth	7,827	
Peter Bjornson	7,595	
Ryan Palmqust	5,330	
Ben Singer	3,435	

Louis Riel School Division Ward 4 (Elect 2)
Candidate	Votes	%
John Baert	5,722	
Bethany Kolisniak	4,919	
Jocelyn Greenwood	3,564	
Chipalo Simunyola	2,093	

Pembina Trails School Division Ward 1 (Elect 3)
Candidate	Votes	%
Samantha Pope	6,871	
Janet Belluk	4,553	
Terri Macleod	4,049	
Linda Karn	3,528	
Craig Stahlke	3,324	
Sharon Esau	3,125	

Pembina Trails School Division Ward 2 (Elect 3)
Candidate	Votes	%
Tim Johnson (Acclaimed)	0	100
Lauralee Gooding (Acclaimed)	0	100
Christine Jolly (Acclaimed)	0	100

Pembina Trails School Division Ward 3 (Elect 3)
Candidate	Votes	%
Cindy Nachtigall	6,332	
Alicia Becker	5,042	
Clarissa Reyes	4,285	
Heethy Maan	2,543	
Eric Labaupa	1,703	
Patricia Eyamba	1,676	
Norman Zaheer	1,470	
Veerpal Sandhu	1,305	
Tony Guan	1,236	
Asim Nawaz	1,214	
Tasneem Vali	1,058	
Towela Mkanda	1,055	

River East Transcona School Division Ward 1 (Elect 2)
Candidate	Votes	%
Colleen Carswell	4,584	
Susan Bywater	3,125	
Adam Burkowski	2,230	
Jerry Sodomlak	2,168	
Ryan Frick	1,286	

River East Transcona School Division Ward 2 (Elect 2)
Candidate	Votes	%
Sherri Hanson	5,852	
Idunnu Tokurah	2,537	
Manjot Kang	2,508	

River East Transcona School Division Ward 3 (Elect 2)
Candidate	Votes	%
Brianne Goertzen	3,517	
Lindsay Fritzsche	2,569	
Gary Kowalski	2,451	
Lorlie Froese	2,106	
Brian Hooper	1,857	

River East Transcona School Division Ward 4 (Elect 3)
Candidate	Votes	%
Susan Olynik	6,589	
Michelle Kowalchuk		
Peter Kotyk		
Pamela Jansen		
Jenn Kiziak		
Timothy Giesbrecht		
Chloe Wowryk Bakker		
Brenda Bage		
Joe Hilmerich		

Seven Oaks School Division Ward 2 (Elect 4)
Candidate	Votes	%
Jagjit Khattra		
Manpreet Toor		
Leila Castro		
Rob Bilsland		
Sandeep Bhatti		
Derek Dabee (Note: Derek Dabee passed away October 25, 2026)		
Ernesto Ofiaza		
Dirk Leavesley		

Seven Oaks School Division Ward 3 (Elect 4)
Candidate	Votes	%
Evan Krosney		
Lisa Brooks		
Edward Ploszay		
Mary–Jane Napolitano		
Richard Sawka		
Danica Vicovac		
Teresa Jaworski		

St. James Assiniboia School Division Centre Ward (Elect 3)
Candidate	Votes	%
Ganesh Tailor		
Pierre Attallah		
Michael Cabral		
Craig Johnson		
Craig McGregor		

St. James Assiniboia School Division East Ward (Elect 3)
Candidate	Votes	%
Pradeev Sockalingam		
Tara Smith		
Vicki Rempel		
Holly Hunter		

St. James Assiniboia School Division West Ward (3 Elected)
Candidate	Votes	%
Sandy Lethbridge (Acclaimed)	0	100
Cheryl Smukowich (Acclaimed)	0	100
Fiona Shiells (Acclaimed)	0	100

Winnipeg School Division Ward 1 (1 Elected)
Candidate	Votes	%
Katrina Tessier (Acclaimed)	0	100

Winnipeg School Division Ward 2 (Elect 1)
Candidate	Votes	%
Chris Brown		
Jennifer Claydon		
Andrew Kohan		
Michael Thompson		

Winnipeg School Division Ward 3 (1 Elected)
Candidate	Votes	%
Kathy Heppner (Acclaimed)	0	100

Winnipeg School Division Ward 4 (Elect 1)
Candidate	Votes	%
Linda Hathout		
Jamie Bonner		
Lionel Lien		

Winnipeg School Division Ward 5 (1 Elected)
Candidate	Votes	%
Reid Pereira (Acclaimed)	0	100

Winnipeg School Division Ward 6 (1 Elected)
Candidate	Votes	%
Dante Aviso (Acclaimed)	0	100

Winnipeg School Division Ward 7 (1 Elected)
Candidate	Votes	%
Tamara Kuly (Acclaimed)	0	100

Winnipeg School Division Ward 8 (Elect 1)
Candidate	Votes	%
Leah Mason		
Prabhnoor Singh		
Sonia Becenko		
Michael Block		
Patrick Allard		
Ewa Romolo		

Winnipeg School Division Ward 9 (Elect 1)
Candidate	Votes	%
Ann Evangelista		
Linda Schatkowsky		
