= Robert-Falcon Ouellette =

Canadian politician (born 1979)

Robert-Falcon Ouellette CD

Member of Parliament for Winnipeg Centre
- In office October 19, 2015 – October 21, 2019
- Preceded by: Pat Martin
- Succeeded by: Leah Gazan

Personal details
- Born: November 22, 1979 (age 47) Calgary, Alberta, Canada
- Party: Liberal
- Spouse: unmarried
- Education: University of Calgary (BA); Université Laval (MMus, MEd, PhD)
- Website: robertfalcon.ca
- Military career
- Branch: Canadian Army; Royal Canadian Navy
- Service years: 1996–present
- Rank: Captain
- Units: Royal Canadian Navy (HMCS Tecumseh) 1996–1998; Royal Canadian Artillery 1998; Royal 22e Regiment 1998–2004; Royal Canadian Navy (HMCS Montcalm) 2004–2007; Royal Canadian Navy NAVRESHQ 2007; 5th Field Ambulance (Medical service) 2007–2010; Royal Canadian Navy (HMCS Montcalm) 2010-2011; Royal Canadian Navy (HMCS Chippawa) 2011–2020; Royal Winnipeg Rifles 2020–2025; Fort Garry Horse 2025–present

Robert-Falcon Ouellette CD (born November 22, 1979) is a Canadian politician who represented the riding of Winnipeg Centre in the House of Commons of Canada from 2015 to 2019. He has also been a two-time candidate for Mayor of Winnipeg in the 2014 Winnipeg municipal election and the 2022 Winnipeg municipal election.

He is of Cree, Métis, French and English descent; Ouellette is a veteran of over 30 years in the Canadian Forces and was a community organizer and academic administrator before his entry into politics. He has also completed a full Sundance cycle at the Sprucewoods Sundance under David Blacksmith.

Robert-Falcon Ouellette made history as the first Indigenous Knowledge Keeper in the Canadian Armed Forces (CAF), becoming the first Indigenous chaplain in 2025. He has served for 29 years and he was the first MP since WWII to concurrently serve in the CAF (reserves) while being an MP. He is currently an associate professor at the University of Ottawa in Indigenous education and Director of the French Teacher Education Programs.

== Early life and career ==
Ouellette is from Red Pheasant Cree Nation, 30 minutes south of Battleford, Saskatchewan. He was raised in Calgary.

His father, Jimmy is mixed Cree and Métis and from the Red Pheasant First Nation, located south of North Battleford, Saskatchewan. Ouellette's father was a student in the Canadian Indian residential school system and an alcoholic who was sometimes absent. His namesake was his mother's younger brother Robert-Falcon Green who died in 1961 at age 9. Ouellette was raised primarily by his mother, Sharon, a poorly educated woman with a history of depression. His mother was born in Tottenham, North London and moved from England to Canada in 1974.

Ouellette grew up in poor conditions, often going hungry, and as a child he once spent a summer homeless in Winnipeg sleeping in city parks. Determined to change her son's future, Ouellette's mother insisted that he take the admissions test for the Strathcona-Tweedsmuir School, an elite private school. After Ouellette was admitted, his mother paid for his tuition by taking out a loan she could not afford to pay back.

Ouellette earned a Bachelor of Arts in music from the University of Calgary in 2001. In 2004 and 2007 he earned a Master's in Music and a Master's in Education from Laval University. In 2011 he completed his PhD in anthropology, also from Laval University in Quebec City. He was only the second indigenous person in the 350-year history of UL to earn a PhD. While attending university in Quebec City he was also working full time in the Canadian Army, which required him to complete his course material at night or occasionally in the field. While in Quebec City he learned to fluently speak, write and read French, after having been posted to the Royal 22e Regiment, a French-Canadian military unit.

From 2007 to 2010 he was appointed a Company Commander in the 5e ambulance du campagne or 5th Field Ambulance (the medical service) where he was responsible for helping to run the base hospital. He retired from the Royal Canadian Navy after nearly two decades of service with the rank of Petty Officer 1st class and remains as part of the Primary Reserves in the Royal Winnipeg Rifles as a Warrant Officer. He moved to Winnipeg in 2011 from Quebec City after he was appointed as director of the Aboriginal Focus Programs at the University of Manitoba. He was also the first Member of Parliament who concurrently served as a non-commissioned member of the Canadian Forces and the first MP since the end of the second World War who served concurrently. He was also the first First Nations person to serve on the House of Commons Standing Committee of Finance from 2015-2017.

== Municipal politics ==
In 2005, Ouellette ran for a city council seat for Quebec City Council, but lost by 170 votes.

Ouellette finished third in the 2014 Winnipeg mayoral election. He had run on a platform of dedicated to making Winnipeg a Child Friendly City (UNICEF model), Rail Relocation, Light Rail Transit, bridging economic divides, racial inequality, infrastructure funding and campaign finance reform. Shortly after his defeat, he declared that he was developing a business plan to open a Winnipeg university catering to indigenous post-secondary students to improve educational outcomes for Indigenous peoples. He currently works at Yellowquill College in Winnipeg where they recently obtained degree granting status from the Dakota Ojibway Tribal Council.

On May 3, 2022, Ouellette announced a second run for Mayor of Winnipeg in the 2022 Winnipeg mayoral election. He ran on a platform of crime reduction, better city transit and lower fees, a Child Friendly City policy, dealing with the mental health and addictions crisis and fiscal responsibility.

== Federal politics ==
In the 2015 election, Ouellette took over 55 per cent of the vote and defeated longtime NDP MP Pat Martin in Winnipeg Centre. Ouellette resigned his position with the University of Manitoba in July 2015 to focus on his campaign. After his election, Ouellette was considered a leading candidate for the position of Minister of Aboriginal Affairs.

Ouellette withdrew from the race to be Speaker of the House of Commons after making comments at a Winnipeg town hall meeting stating the position comes with "great influence" over the Prime Minister to the extent of calling the Prime Minister to the Speaker's Chair to address constituent's concerns.

=== Voting record ===
Ouellette was known for voting according to his citizens wishes saying "I was elected to be the voice of the citizens of Winnipeg to Ottawa and not the voice of Ottawa to my citizens." In 2016 he was the sole dissenting voice voting against C-14 Euthanasia Bill that was being voted on in the House of Commons. This one of the first votes by an MP in the 42nd Parliament to vote against their party. By 2017 He had voted 17 times against government legislation becoming the second highest total in Canadian modern Parliamentary history. By 2019 this was at 21 votes. According to a Hill Times article it seems that it was unusual that a Canadian MP would be allowed to remain in caucus so long without repercussions.

He was the only Liberal MP to have voted against the bill that legalized euthanasia, saying it was against his deep spiritual beliefs and would cause harm to Indigenous peoples. He voted in support Nathaniel Erskine-Smith's Bill C-246: An Act to amend the Criminal Code, the Fisheries Act, the Textile Labelling Act, the Wild Animal and Plant Protection and Regulation of International and Interprovincial Trade Act and the Canada Consumer Product Safety Act (animal protection). Ouellette also voted against a government bill that ordered striking Canada Post delivery staff back to work during a protracted labour dispute between management and workers in the crown corporation.

Ouellette is known for voting on issues in Parliament according to his constituents desires, often voting against his own party. The vast majority of Members of Parliament in Canada vote according to instructions given by their party's whip. Members of political parties in Canada who break ranks are often punished or ejected from their political party. He has still voted with the government 87 per cent of the time.

=== Reconciliation and Indigenous peoples ===
Ouellette was the chair of Indigenous Caucus and the member of Standing Committee on Health and Finance. He was the first chair of the all Parliamentary Indigenous caucus which brought together MPs and Senators. He was also the co-chair of All-Party Parliamentary Group (APPG) to end Slavery and Human Trafficking. He is a supporter of the Moose Hide Campaign which is aimed to fight against violence towards women and children and human trafficking in Canada.

==== Indigenous languages ====
Since elected in 2015, Ouellette started to fight for indigenous language rights. On May 4, 2017, Ouellette gave the very first entire speech in an indigenous language (Cree) in the House of Commons history. It was about violence and missing and murdered indigenous women and girls. He demanded the House of Commons provide interpretation and translation services for the speech, but this was refused because it was not permissible under the rules. After a lengthy debate the Speaker of the House Geoff Regan ruled against allowing the interpretation of Indigenous languages because no reference was found in the standing orders. Subsequently, the matter was referred to the Standing Committee on Procedure where the issue was studied. Eventually the House of Commons adopted changes to provide for the simultaneous interpretation of Indigenous languages during proceedings late in 2018. On January 28, 2019, Ouellette became the first MP to speak in an indigenous language while the House provided live translation. Later he worked with colleagues in the Liberal and Conservative caucuses where a 20-minute debate was conducted fully in Cree; this included non-indigenous MPs.

==== Child welfare legislation ====
Ouellette made a campaign pledge in 2015 to reform child welfare in Canada, due to the major impact that CFS was having on populations in the inner city of Winnipeg and the resulting increase in the homeless population. After much lobbying and work in 2019 government legislation was introduced (C-92) to address many of the rampant inequalities and discrimination suffering indigenous children. The legislation, Bill C-92, would ensure that Indigenous government jurisdiction on this matter over rides other levels of government including provincial and federal. This is permitted under section 92(24) of the Constitution. This bill was co-developed with Indigenous partners, including the Assembly of First Nations, Inuit Tapiriit Kanatami, and the Metis National Council, Bill C-92 seeks to affirm Indigenous peoples’ inherent right to exercise jurisdiction over child and family services. Indigenous peoples should be allowed to care for their own children in a culturally appropriate way. For over 20 years in Manitoba, NDP and Conservative governments took more children into the child welfare system than at any point during the height of the Indian Residential School era. The Federal Child Welfare Reform legislation (C-92) has passed and came into force in its entirety on January 1, 2020. On June 21, 2019, Bill C-92 An Act Respecting First Nations, Inuit and Métis Children, Youth and Families became law. The Bill is a huge and unprecedented step forward in Canada. It is the first time the federal government has exercised its jurisdiction to legislate in the area of Indigenous child welfare.

In C-92, Ouellette was also able to ensure that customary adoption was included as articles of law to help indigenous communities and nations return to more traditional forms of childcare. Customary adoption is important to Ouellette because one of his children was adopted in a customary Cree manner and he felt the lack of current laws on this issue did not help or protect indigenous children.

==== Murdered and missing Indigenous people ====
Since 2016, Ouellette started to work with Lillian Dyck for a new law which would help protect Indigenous women if they were victims of violent crime. The vote was lost and the bill defeated during second reading in the House of Commons in April 2019. Eventually the legislation was incorporated into a federal Justice Bill.

=== Private members legislation ===
In May 2016, Ouellette introduced his first Private Member's Bill C-318: An Act to establish Indian Residential School Reconciliation and Memorial Day to Parliament. This was legislation developed with help from elders in Winnipeg putting forward for the first time that Indian Residential Schools constituted Genocide. the legislation was eventually adopted by the House of Commons in 2021 and saw the creation of the first National Day for Truth and Reconciliation.

In December 2016, after consultation with unions, citizens and international victims, hurt and impacted by asbestos; Ouellette proposed new federal legislation. C-329 An Act to amend the Canadian Environmental Protection Act, 1999 (asbestos) eventually helped pressure the federal government to ban production and trade in the dangerous material of asbestos, helping to save thousands of lives.

Also in December 2016, Ouellette proposed C-332 An Act to provide for reporting on compliance with the United Nations Declaration on the Rights of Indigenous Peoples UNDRIP. In behind the scenes work Ouellette, as chair of the Indigenous caucus led efforts to ensure that UNDRIP was adopted as Canadian legislation. UNDRIP was eventually made law as bill C-15 in 2021.

=== Drug addiction and mental health ===
In September 2018, to raise awareness about the violence and drug addiction issues facing Winnipeg and get the provincial and city government's actions, Ouellette erected his family tipi in Central Park and slept out in the open for a three days with the homeless and drug addicts. Then he worked with Dr Doug Eyolfson to provide a substantive House of Commons Health Committee Report on meth & addiction. He also called on all MPs to combat meth crisis in November 2018.

The Prime Minister Justin Trudeau and the federal government appointed Ouellette their representative to work with the Manitoba Health Minister Cameron Friesen and Brian Bowman the Mayor of the City of Winnipeg of a triparty task force to find actions all three levels of government could take to reduce the impact of addictions and mental health on Winnipeg and Manitoba. The illicit drug task-force produced it report which actions for all three levels of government.

He was defeated in the 2019 election.

== Personal life ==
Ouellette lives in the inner city near Central Park, Winnipeg. He also speaks French, English, and continues to learn Cree and Mandarin. He is also a professional musician and plays instruments such as trumpet and euphonium.

== Electoral record ==
=== Federal ===
2019 Canadian federal election: Winnipeg Centre
Party	Candidate	Votes	%	±%	Expenditures
New Democratic	Leah Gazan	13,073	41.21	+13.20	$81,565.86
Liberal	Robert-Falcon Ouellette	10,704	33.74	-20.77	$93,870.93
Conservative	Ryan Dyck	5,561	17.53	+5.17	$16,427.27
Green	Andrea Shalay	1,661	5.24	+1.17	none listed
People's	Yogi Henderson	474	1.49	–	none listed
Christian Heritage	Stephanie Hein	251	0.79	+0.14	none listed
Total valid votes/expense limit		31,724	100.0		
Total rejected ballots		274			
Turnout		31,998	54.2		
Eligible voters		59,012			
New Democratic gain from Liberal		Swing		+16.99	
Source: Elections Canada

2015 Canadian federal election
Party	Candidate	Votes	%	±%	Expenditures
Liberal	Robert-Falcon Ouellette	18,471	54.51	+43.44	$78,690.24
New Democratic	Pat Martin	9,490	28.01	−25.65	$107,665.59
Conservative	Allie Szarkiewicz	4,189	12.36	−15.28	$32,494.32
Green	Don Woodstock	1,379	4.07	−2.98	$38,782.49
Christian Heritage	Scott Miller	221	0.65	n/a	$1,210.15
Communist	Darrell Rankin	135	0.40	−0.19	$0.00
Total valid votes/Expense limit		33,885	100.00		$191,132.58
Total rejected ballots		281	0.82	–	
Turnout		34,166	61.41	–	
Eligible voters		55,633			
Liberal gain from New Democratic		Swing		+34.59	
Source: Elections Canada

=== Provincial ===
2023 Manitoba general election: Southdale
Party	Candidate	Votes	%	±%	Expenditures
New Democratic	Renée Cable	5,569	48.48	+10.64	$44,447.54
Progressive Conservative	Audrey Gordon	3,922	34.14	-8.26	$50,821.24
Liberal	Robert Falcon Ouellette	1,861	16.20	+2.73	$17,836.49
Independent	Amarjit Singh	135	1.18	–	$5,835.09
Total valid votes/expense limit		11,487	99.65	–	$69,403.00
Total rejected and declined ballots		40	0.35	–	
Turnout		11,527	64.72	+3.06	
Eligible voters		17,810			
New Democratic gain from Progressive Conservative		Swing		+9.45	
Source(s) Source: Elections Manitoba

=== Municipal ===
2014 Winnipeg Mayoral
Candidate	Votes	%
(x) Brian Bowman	111,504	47.54
Judy Wasylycia-Leis	58,440	24.29
Robert-Falcon Ouellette	36,823	15.70
Gord Steeves	21,080	8.99
David Sanders	3,718	1.59
Paula Havixbeck	2,083	0.89
Michel Fillion	898	0.38

2022 Winnipeg Mayoral
Candidate	Votes	%
Scott Gillingham	53203	27.46
Glen Murray	49017	25.30
Kevin Klein	28658	14.79
Shaun Loney	28458	14.69
Robert-Falcon Ouellette	15029	7.75
Jenny Motkaluk	7414	3.83
Rana Bokhari	5871	3.03
Rick Shone	2563	1.32
Don Woodstock	1879	0.97
Idris Adelakun	1257	0.65
Chris Clacio	450	0.23
Voter Turnout	193789	37
