= 2022 Winnipeg municipal election =

Municipal election in Manitoba, Canada

2022 Winnipeg mayoral election
- October 26, 2022
- Turnout: 37.17%
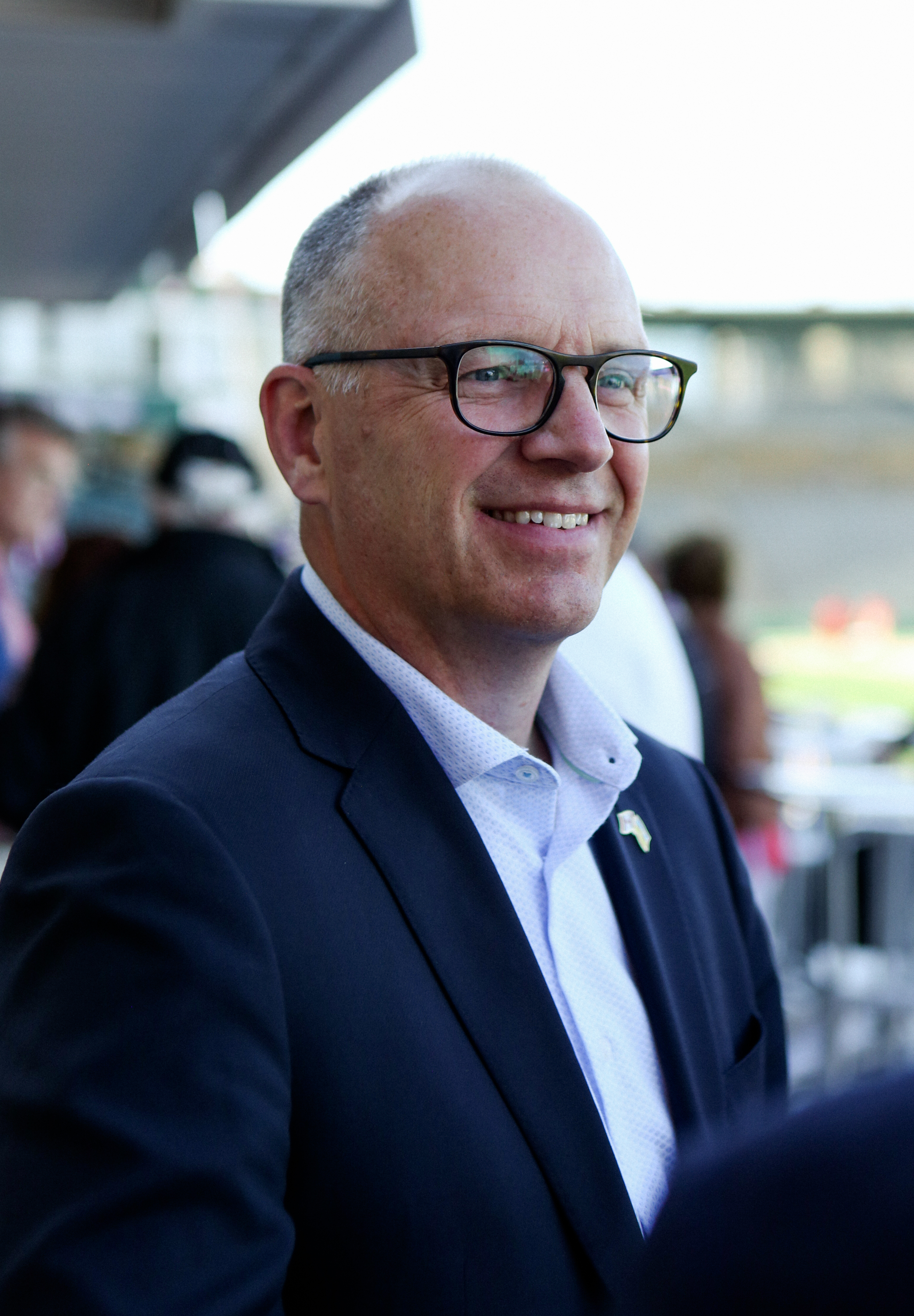

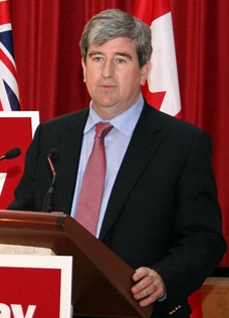
			KK
Candidate	Scott Gillingham	Glen Murray	Kevin Klein
Popular vote	53,663	49,272	28,806
Percentage	27.54%	25.29%	14.78%
	SL	RFO
Candidate	Shaun Loney	Robert-Falcon Ouellette
Popular vote	28,567	15,029
Percentage	14.66%	7.71%
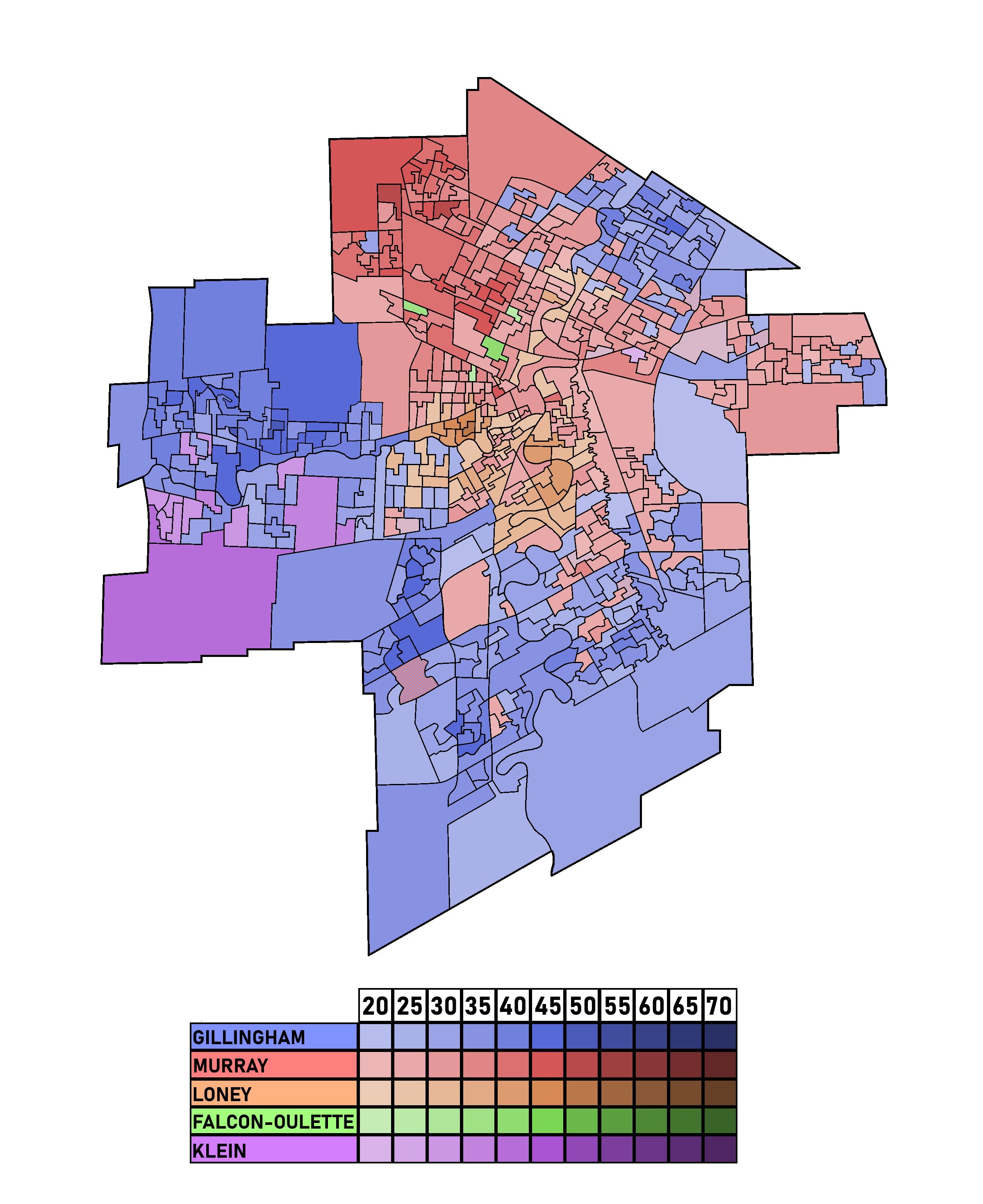
Mayor before election
Brian Bowman
Mayor
Scott Gillingham

The 2022 Winnipeg municipal election took place on October 26, 2022. The offices of mayor, city councillors, and school trustees of the city of Winnipeg were elected as a result of this election. Elections were held as part of municipal elections held across the province. The elections used the first-past-the-post voting election system, either to elect the mayor in a municipality-wide district, or to elect councillors in single-member wards.

== Mayoral election ==
The incumbent mayor, Brian Bowman, announced on October 23, 2020, that he would not be running for a third term. He said that he was not a career politician, and that he had no plans for a future in politics. Scott Gillingham was elected mayor with just over 27% of the vote.

=== Candidates ===
==== Idris Adelakun ====
Candidacy registered: May 11, 2022
Campaign website: idrisformayor.com

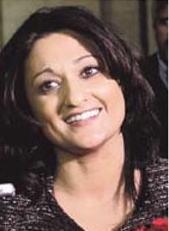
Rana Bokhari

==== Rana Bokhari ====
Candidacy registered: May 27, 2022
Campaign website: ranaforwpg.ca

==== Chris Clacio ====
Candidacy registered: May 1, 2022
Campaign website: christopherclacio.wixsite.com

==== Scott Gillingham ====
Candidacy registered: May 2, 2022
Campaign website: voteforscott.ca

==== Kevin Klein ====
Candidacy registered: July 29, 2022
Campaign website: kevinklein.ca

==== Shaun Loney ====
Candidacy registered: May 4, 2022
Campaign website: shaunforwinnipeg.com

==== Jenny Motkaluk ====
Candidacy registered: May 1, 2022
Campaign website: jennyformayor.ca

==== Glen Murray ====
Candidacy registered: June 22, 2022
Campaign website: glen4wpg.ca

==== Robert-Falcon Ouellette ====
Candidacy registered: May 3, 2022
Campaign website: robertfalcon.ca

==== Rick Shone ====
Candidacy registered: May 2, 2022
Campaign website: rickshone.com

==== Don Woodstock ====
Candidacy registered: May 1, 2022
Campaign website: donwoodstock.com

=== Opinion polls ===
Polling firm	Link	Last date of polling	Bokhari	Gillingham	Klein	Loney	Motkaluk	Murray	Ouellette	Shone	Others	Margin of error	Sample size	Lead
Léger		October 11, 2022	4	19	14	13	8	28	7	4	2	n/a (Note: Margin of error cannot be calculated for non-probability based surveys.)	496	9
Probe		September 18, 2022	3	15	10	14	4	40	7	3	4	±4%	600	25
Probe		July 25, 2022	4	16	–	6	8	44	13	3	8	±4%	622	28
Mainstreet (Note: Poll of all voters, including undecided voters. Data has been updated for consistency to reflect only decided voters.)		July 23, 2022	5.9	17.1	–	–	7.1	51.3	14.3	4.3	–	±3.9%	628	34.2

=== Results ===
Candidate	Votes	%
Scott Gillingham	53,663	27.54
Glen Murray	49,272	25.29
Kevin Klein	28,806	14.78
Shaun Loney	28,567	14.66
Robert-Falcon Ouellette	15,029	7.71
Jenny Motkaluk	7,443	3.82
Rana Bokhari	5,900	3.03
Rick Shone	2,570	1.32
Don Woodstock	1,889	0.97
Idris Adelakun	1,263	0.65
Chris Clacio	451	0.23

== City Councillor elections ==
(X) denotes the incumbent.

=== City Council candidates ===
Charleswood-Tuxedo-Westwood
Candidate	Votes	%
Evan Duncan	9,491	52.12
Hal Anderson	6,855	37.64
Gordon Penner	1,090	5.99
Brad Gross	407	2.24
Steven Minion	367	2.02

Daniel McIntyre
Candidate	Votes	%
Cindy Gilroy (X)	5,476	52.50
Sal Infantino	2,484	23.82
Omar Kinnarath	2,470	23.68

Elmwood-East Kildonan
Candidate	Votes	%
Jason Schreyer (X)	5,554	62.19
Ryan Kochie	3,376	37.81

Fort Rouge-East Fort Garry
Candidate	Votes	%
Sherri Rollins (X)	9,704	75.94
Michael Thompson	3,075	24.06

Mynarski
Candidate	Votes	%
Ross Eadie (X)	3,779	42.59
Natalie Smith	2,016	22.72
Aaron McDowell	1,798	20.26
Steve Snyder	950	10.71
Ed Radchenka	330	3.72

North Kildonan
Candidate	Votes	%
Jeff Browaty (X)	10,725	72.69
Andrew Podolecki	4,030	27.31

Old Kildonan
Candidate	Votes	%
Devi Sharma (X)	Acclaimed	

Point Douglas
Candidate	Votes	%
Vivian Santos (X)	4,459	54.48
Moe Eltassi	2,485	30.36
Joe Pereira	1,240	15.15

River Heights-Fort Garry
Candidate	Votes	%
John Orlikow (X)	12,237	73.13
Brant Field	3,406	20.35
Gary Lenko	1,090	6.51

St. Boniface
Candidate	Votes	%
Matt Allard (X)	10,124	67.79
Nicholas Douklias	3,876	25.95
Marcel Boille	934	6.25

St. James
Candidate	Votes	%
Shawn Dobson	4,880	33.61
Kelly Ryback	3,693	25.43
Daevid Ramey	2,218	15.28
Eddie Ayoub	2,062	14.20
Tim Diack	1,667	11.48

St. Norbert-Seine River
Candidate	Votes	%
Markus Chambers (X)	Acclaimed	

St. Vital
Candidate	Votes	%
Brian Mayes (X)	12,500	83.51
Derrick Dujlovic	1,594	10.65
Baljeet Sharma	875	5.85

Transcona
Candidate	Votes	%
Russ Wyatt	6,010	46.38
Shawn Nason (X)	5,034	38.85
Steve Lipischak	1,048	8.09
Wally Welechenko	866	6.68

Waverley West
Candidate	Votes	%
Janice Lukes (X)	8,580	80.90
Pascal Scott	2,026	19.10
