= Renée Cable =

Canadian politician (born 1979)

The Honourable Renée Cable MLA
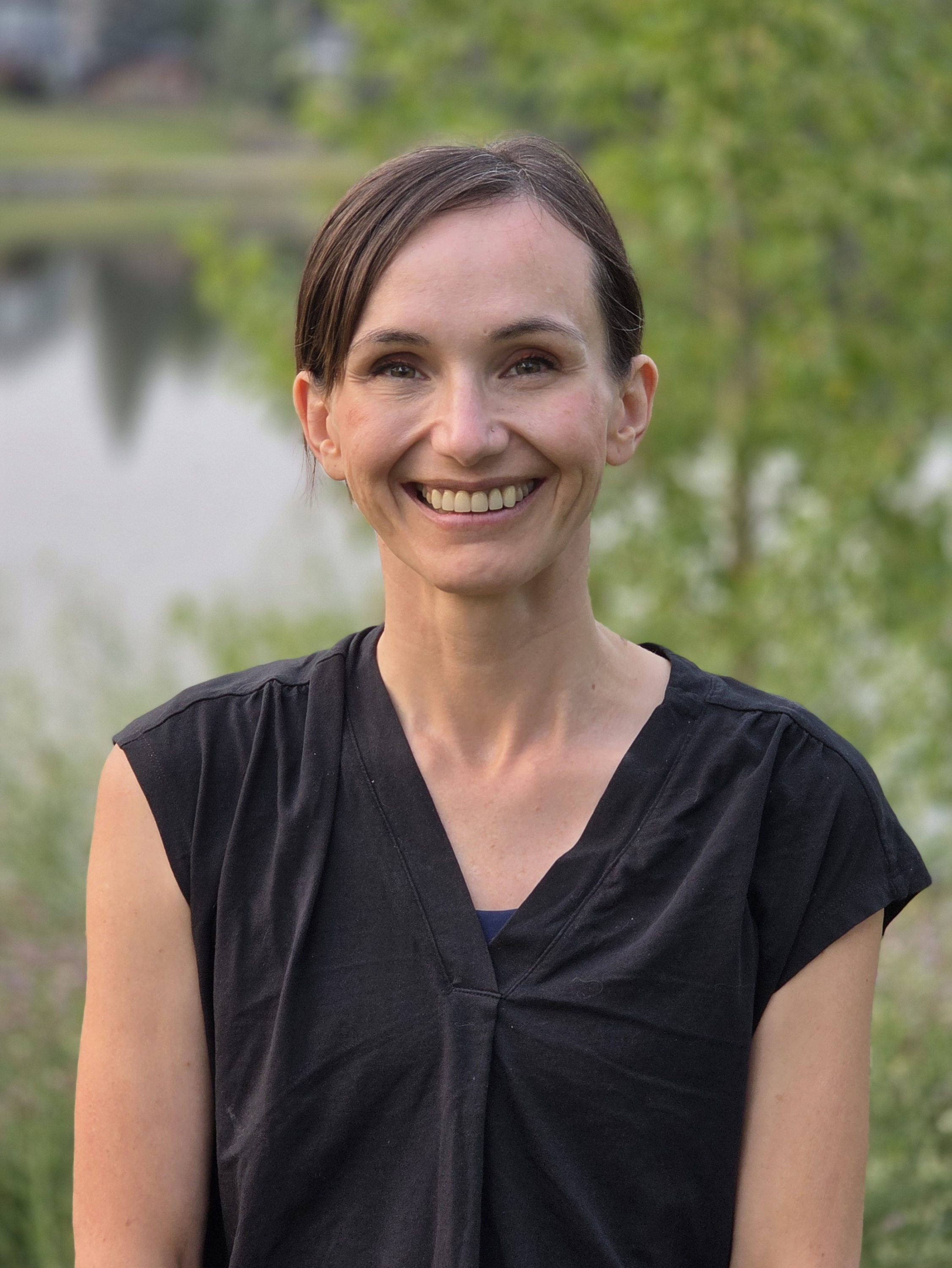

Minister of Advanced Education and Training
- Incumbent
- Assumed office October 18, 2023
- Premier: Wab Kinew
- Preceded by: Sarah Guillemard

Member of the Legislative Assembly of Manitoba for Southdale
- Incumbent
- Assumed office October 3, 2023
- Preceded by: Audrey Gordon

Personal details
- Born: April 8, 1979 (age 47) Brandon, Manitoba, Canada
- Party: New Democratic
- Spouse: Thomas Linner
- Children: 2
- Education: University of Winnipeg (BA)

Renée Michelle Cable (born April 8, 1979) is a Canadian politician who has been the Minister of Advanced Education and Training for Manitoba since October 18, 2023. She was elected to the Legislative Assembly of Manitoba in the 2023 Manitoba general election, representing the district of Southdale as a member of the Manitoba New Democratic Party. Cable is Métis and moved with her family to Windsor Park in her constituency one year before the 2023 Manitoba general election.

She grew up in Brandon, Manitoba and is married to Thomas Linner.

== Electoral history ==
2023 Manitoba general election: Southdale
Party	Candidate	Votes	%	±%	Expenditures
New Democratic	Renée Cable	5,569	48.48	+10.64	$44,447.54
Progressive Conservative	Audrey Gordon	3,922	34.14	-8.26	$50,821.24
Liberal	Robert Falcon Ouellette	1,861	16.20	+2.73	$17,836.49
Independent	Amarjit Singh	135	1.18	–	$5,835.09
Total valid votes/expense limit		11,487	99.65	–	$69,403.00
Total rejected and declined ballots		40	0.35	–	
Turnout		11,527	64.72	+3.06	
Eligible voters		17,810			
New Democratic gain from Progressive Conservative		Swing		+9.45	
Source(s) Source: Elections Manitoba
