= Rana Bokhari =

Canadian politician (born 1977)

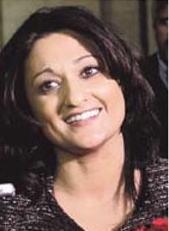

Leader of the Manitoba Liberal Party
- In office October 26, 2013 – September 24, 2016
- Preceded by: Jon Gerrard
- Succeeded by: Judy Klassen (interim)

Personal details
- Born: October 23, 1977 (age 48) Anola, Manitoba, Canada
- Party: Liberal
- Education: University of Manitoba
- Profession: Lawyer

Rana Bokhari (born October 23, 1977) is a politician in Manitoba, Canada who was the leader of the Manitoba Liberal Party from 2013 until 2016.

== Background ==
Bokhari was born on a farm near Anola, Manitoba. As a student she attended the University of Manitoba where she obtained degrees in criminology and psychology. She then went on to complete a degree in law at Robson Hall, focusing on corporate commercial law. Bokhari was active in the Manitoba Law Students Association, serving as President in 2012.

Bokhari moved to Pakistan in 2002, living there with her family until she returned to Winnipeg in 2006. Her childhood home and family chicken farm were lost to a fire in 2012.

== Political career ==
After long-standing Manitoba Liberal Party leader Jon Gerrard resigned his position in 2013, Bokhari was the first person formally to declare her candidacy. She faced two opponents, Bob Axworthy and Dougald Lamont. During the party leadership contest, Bokhari was seen as an outsider. Although two of her relatives had stood as Liberal candidates at the previous provincial election, she had not previously had a profile in the provincial party. Despite this, she was endorsed by the Manitoba Senator Maria Chaput, the leading Liberal candidate from the 2011 elections, Paul Hesse and party Vice-President Robert Young. She won a first ballot victory by one vote, with 431 votes.

The victory made Rana Bokhari the youngest person ever to lead the Manitoba Liberals and the first Manitoban of South Asian descent to lead a political party in the province.

She faced internal criticism from party members and former leadership challenger Bob Axworthy, who accused Bokhari of "purging" longtime Manitoba Liberal members as she solidified control of the party. Party membership and fundraising struggled under Bokhari.

Bokhari committed to making Manitoba the "hub of something" in her year end interview with the Winnipeg Free Press. She explained "I want Manitoba to be the IT capital of this country or the innovation capital of this country."

In 2014 Bokhari endorsed Winnipeg mayoral candidate Brian Bowman in the 2014 Winnipeg Municipal election.

In the 2016 Manitoba general election Bokhari finished third in Fort Rouge, behind future Manitoba NDP leader Wab Kinew. On May 7, 2016, Bokhari announced that she would not lead the party into the next election but would remain on as leader until her successor was chosen. She ultimately resigned as leader, effective September 24, 2016, and opened a law practice, Bokhari, Smith and Walker, the same month.

On May 31, 2022, Bokhari announced her intention to run for Mayor of Winnipeg in the city's 2022 civic election, which was held October 26, 2022. She placed seventh, with 3.03% of the vote (5,900 votes).

== Electoral results ==
2016 Manitoba general election: Fort Rouge
Party	Candidate	Votes	%	±%
New Democratic	Wab Kinew	3,360	37.63	–13.32
Progressive Conservative	Audrey Gordon	2,571	28.80	+8.76
Liberal	Rana Bokhari	1,792	20.07	–2.92
Green	Grant Sharp	983	11.01	+5.60
Manitoba	Matthew Ostrove	175	1.96	–
Communist	Paula Ducharme	47	0.53	–
Total valid votes		8,928	100.0	
Total rejected and declined ballots		125	1.38	
Turnout		9,053	65.15	
Eligible voters		13,896		
New Democratic hold		Swing		–11.04
Source: Elections Manitoba
