= Audrey Gordon =

Canadian politician

Manitoba Minister of Health
- In office January 18, 2022 – October 18, 2023
- Premier: Heather Stefanson
- Preceded by: Portfolio renamed
- Succeeded by: Uzoma Asagwara

Manitoba Minister of Health and Seniors Care
- In office August 18, 2021 – January 18, 2022
- Premier: Brian Pallister; Kelvin Goertzen; Heather Stefanson
- Preceded by: Heather Stefanson
- Succeeded by: Portfolio renamed

Minister of Mental Health, Wellness and Recovery
- In office January 5, 2021 – January 18, 2022
- Premier: Brian Pallister; Kelvin Goertzen; Heather Stefanson
- Preceded by: Portfolio established
- Succeeded by: Sarah Guillemard

Member of the Legislative Assembly of Manitoba for Southdale
- In office September 10, 2019 – September 5, 2023
- Preceded by: Andrew Smith
- Succeeded by: Renée Cable

Personal details
- Party: Progressive Conservative Party of Manitoba
- Education: University of Manitoba (BA, MBA)

Audrey Gordon is a Canadian politician who was a member of the Legislative Assembly of Manitoba from 2019 to 2023, representing the electoral district of Southdale as a member of the Progressive Conservative Party of Manitoba. Alongside Jamie Moses and Uzoma Asagwara, she was one of the first three Black Canadian MLAs elected in the 2019 Manitoba general election.

== Early life and career ==
Born in Jamaica as the seventh of eight children, Gordon's family moved to Winnipeg when she was five. Gordon attended the University of Manitoba and where she completed both a BA and MBA.

Prior to entering politics, Gordon was the Director of Strategic Initiatives at the Winnipeg Regional Health Authority and a provincial civil servant for 25 years.

== Political career ==
At the 2016 general election, Gordon stood in the central Winnipeg constituency of Fort Rouge. She came in second place to Wab Kinew, who later became leader of the Manitoba NDP, narrowing the NDP majority in the district; Manitoba Liberal Party leader Rana Bokhari, who did not have a seat at the time of the election, ran third in this riding.

At the 2019 general election, Gordon was elected in the southeastern Winnipeg constituency of Southdale.

In August 2020, Gordon was victim of a racist attack when a bench with her image on it was defaced with graffiti.

In May 2021, Springs Church, of which Gordon is a member, held an in-person graduation event. This was in defiance of restrictions meant to curb the spread of COVID-19. Gordon eventually commented on the event in a Facebook post, adding: "I have read several posts stating that I was present at the Springs graduation ceremony. To my knowledge, no evidence has been provided to substantiate this claim." Her Facebook page was later deactivated.

In November 2021, Gordon was criticized for offering "thoughts and prayers" to Manitobans who had their surgeries cancelled and placed on a waitlist of over 130,000 postponed procedures. As of December 7, the delayed procedure backlog has surpassed 152,000 and on December 8, health officials announced that they would look at cancelling additional surgical procedures as ICU beds are required for new COVID-19 patients that are being admitted to hospitals.

Gordon received further criticism from the opposition and in the media after a third of the nurses in the sexual assault nurse examiner (SANE) program resigned in March 2023. When confronted by the opposition, Gordon shifted the blame to "health system leaders" in the bureaucracy despite this being under her portfolio, bringing on more outcry over her leadership.

At the 2023 general election, Gordon lost re-election to Renée Cable in her riding of Southdale.

== Personal life ==
Gordon is married with two sons.

== Electoral record ==
2023 Manitoba general election: Southdale
Party	Candidate	Votes	%	±%	Expenditures
New Democratic	Renée Cable	5,569	48.48	+10.64	$44,447.54
Progressive Conservative	Audrey Gordon	3,922	34.14	-8.26	$50,821.24
Liberal	Robert Falcon Ouellette	1,861	16.20	+2.73	$17,836.49
Independent	Amarjit Singh	135	1.18	–	$5,835.09
Total valid votes/expense limit		11,487	99.65	–	$69,403.00
Total rejected and declined ballots		40	0.35	–	
Turnout		11,527	64.72	+3.06	
Eligible voters		17,810			
New Democratic gain from Progressive Conservative		Swing		+9.45	
Source(s) Source: Elections Manitoba

2019 Manitoba general election: Southdale
Party	Candidate	Votes	%	±%	Expenditures
Progressive Conservative	Audrey Gordon	4,493	42.40	-9.2	$24,558.56
New Democratic	Karen Myshkowsky	4,010	37.84	+6.9	$14,122.65
Liberal	Spencer Duncanson	1,427	13.47	-3.3	$137.10
Green	Katherine Quinton	595	5.62	+4.8	$0.00
Manitoba Forward	Robert Cairns	71	0.67	New	$0.00
Total valid votes		10,596	99.33		
Total rejected ballots		72	0.67		
Turnout		10,668	61.66		
Eligible voters		17,301			
Progressive Conservative hold		Swing		-8.1	
Source: STATEMENT OF OFFICIAL RESULTS BY VOTING AREA (PDF) (Report). Elections Manitoba. 2019.

2016 Manitoba general election: Fort Rouge
Party	Candidate	Votes	%	±%	Expenditures
New Democratic	Wab Kinew	3,360	37.63	−13.63	$39,199.49
Progressive Conservative	Audrey Gordon	2,571	28.80	8.64	$42,245.54
Liberal	Rana Bokhari	1,792	20.07	−3.06	$30,238.82
Green	Grant Sharp	983	11.01	5.57	$322.90
Manitoba	Matthew Ostrove	175	1.96	–	$945.26
Communist	Paula Ducharme	47	0.53	–	$33.67
Total valid votes / expense limit		8,928	–	–	$44,855.00
Rejected		125	–		
Eligible voters / turnout		13,896	65.15	3.92	
New Democratic hold		Swing		–11.04	
Source(s) Source: Manitoba. Chief Electoral Officer (2016). Statement of Votes for the 41st Provincial General Election, April 19, 2016 (PDF) (Report). Winnipeg: Elections Manitoba. "Election Returns: 41st General Election". Elections Manitoba. 2016.
