= 2014 Manitoba municipal elections =

The Canadian province of Manitoba held municipal elections on Wednesday, October 22, 2014. Election day was held on July 25, 2014 for several beach resorts including Winnipeg Beach, Dunnottar and Victoria Beach. Mayors, councillors, and school board trustees were elected. Candidate registration opened on May 1, 2014 and closed on September 16, 2014.

== Brandon ==
=== Mayor ===
2014 Mayor
Candidate	Votes	%
Rick Chrest	9,085	64.94
Shari Decter Hirst (X)	4,249	30.37
Mark Kovatch	536	3.83
John Paul Jacobson	120	0.86

== Dauphin ==
=== Mayor ===
2014 Mayor
Candidate	Votes	%
Eric Irwin (X)	Acclaimed	

== East St. Paul ==
=== Mayor ===
2014 Mayor
Candidate	Votes	%
Shelley Hart	1,489	39.26
Barry Schreyer	1,322	34.85
Lawrence Morris (X)	982	25.89

== Flin Flon ==
=== Mayor ===
2014 Mayor
Candidate	Votes	%
Cal Huntley	630	48.09
George Fontaine	626	47.79
Robin James	54	4.12

== Gimli ==
=== Mayor ===
2014 Mayor
Candidate	Votes	%
Randy Woroniuk	1,572	48.46
Lynn Greenberg (X)	1,433	44.17
Richard Bjarnason	128	3.95
Jim O'Neill	77	2.37
Bill Massier	34	1.05

== Hanover ==
=== Reeve ===
2014 Reeve
Candidate	Votes	%
Stan Toews (X)	1,497	66.01
Clif Bakx	771	33.99

== La Broquerie ==
=== Reeve ===
2014 Reeve
Candidate	Votes	%
Lewis Weiss	526	38.82
Larry Tetrault	497	36.68
Cornie Goertzen (X)	332	24.50

== Macdonald ==
=== Reeve ===
2014 Reeve
Candidate	Votes	%
Bradley Erb	Acclaimed	

== Morden ==
=== Mayor ===
2014 Mayor
Candidate	Votes	%
Ken Wiebe (X)	Acclaimed	

== Niverville ==
=== Mayor ===
2014 Mayor
Candidate	Votes	%
Myron Dick		

== Portage la Prairie (R.M.) ==
=== Reeve ===
2014 Reeve
Candidate	Votes	%
Kameron Blight (X)	Acclaimed	

== Portage la Prairie (City) ==
=== Mayor ===
2014 Mayor
Candidate	Votes	%
Irvine A. Ferris	2,138	59.36
Earl J. Porter (X)	1,296	35.98
John Boehm	168	4.66

== Ritchot ==
=== Mayoral ===
2014 Mayor
Candidate	Votes	%
Jackie Hunt	832	74.55
Doug Touchette	284	25.45

=== Mayoral by-election: July 19, 2017 ===
2017 Mayor
Candidate	Votes	%
Chris Ewen	742	38.83
Jackie Hunt (X)	650	34.01
Gene Whitney	413	21.61
Marianne Curtis	106	5.55

== Rockwood ==
=== Reeve ===
2014 Reeve
Candidate	Votes	%
Jim Campbell (X)	Acclaimed	

== Selkirk ==
=== Mayor ===
2014 Mayor
Candidate	Votes	%
Larry Johannson (X)	2,701	83.96
Ray Macumber	516	16.04

== Springfield ==
=== Reeve ===
2014 Reeve
Candidate	Votes	%
Bob Bodnaruk	2,927	59.08
Jim McCarthy (X)	1,469	29.65
Norm Howat	558	11.26

== St. Andrews ==
=== Reeve ===
2014 Reeve
Candidate	Votes	%
George Pike	1,852	44.59
Kurtiss Krasnesky	1,217	29.30
Ralph Boch	1,084	26.10

== Stanley ==
=== Mayor ===
2014 Mayor
Candidate	Votes	%
Morris Olafson	493	55.71
Peter Klassen	392	44.29

== St. Clements ==
=== Mayor ===
2014 Mayor
Candidate	Votes	%
Debbie Fiebelkorn	1,671	51.24
Steve Strang (X)	1,350	41.40
Herb Dubowits	240	7.36

== Steinbach ==
=== Mayor ===
2014 Mayor
Candidate	Votes	%
Chris Goertzen (X)	Acclaimed	

=== City council ===
2014 City Council
Candidate	Votes	%
Earl Funk (X)	1,957	
Michael Zwaagstra (X)	1,828	
Jac Siemens (X)	1,766	
Susan Penner (X)	1,713	
John Fehr (X)	1,659	
Cari Penner (X)	1,590	
Ryan Derksen	1,186	

== Taché ==
=== Mayor ===
2014 Mayor
Candidate	Votes	%
Robert Rivard	1,433	59.63
Ross Deschambault	970	40.37

== The Pas ==
=== Mayor ===
2014 Mayor
Candidate	Votes	%
Jim Scott	758	48.56
Alan McLauchlan (X)	699	44.78
Terry Hendrickson	104	6.66

== Thompson ==
=== Mayor ===
2014 Mayor
Candidate	Votes	%
Dennis Fenske	2,050	67.93
Luke Robinson	968	32.07

== Winkler ==
=== Mayor ===
2014 Mayor
Candidate	Votes	%
Martin Harder (X)	1,675	69.44
Wolfgang Schaefer	737	30.56

== Winnipeg ==
=== Mayor ===
2014 Mayor
Candidate	Votes	%
Brian Bowman	111,504	47.54
Judy Wasylycia-Leis	58,440	24.92
Robert-Falcon Ouellette	36,823	15.70
Gord Steeves	21,080	8.99
David Sanders	3,718	1.59
Paula Havixbeck	2,083	0.89
Michel Fillion	898	0.38

=== City council ===
Charleswood-Tuxedo
Candidate	Votes	%
Marty Morantz	6,281	34.94
Evan Duncan	5,812	32.33
Luc Lewandoski	2,950	16.41
Nadine Stiller	1,956	10.88
Kevin Nichols	978	5.44

Daniel McIntyre
Candidate	Votes	%
Cindy Gilroy	4,209	33.54
Keith Bellamy	3,618	28.83
Harvey Smith (X)	3,284	26.17
Dave Donaldson	664	5.29
John Cardoso	518	4.13
Godwin Smith	257	2.05

Elmwood-East Kildonan
Candidate	Votes	%
Jason Schreyer	6,830	55.10
Thomas Steen (X)	4,157	33.54
Paul Quaye	770	6.21
Jason Cumming	638	5.15

Fort Rouge-East Fort Garry
Candidate	Votes	%
Jenny Gerbasi (X)	11,756	73.50
Norm Miller	2,152	13.46
Shane Nestruck	2,086	13.04

Mynarski
Candidate	Votes	%
Ross Eadie (X)	6,565	64.38
Greg Littlejohn	2,698	26.46
Trevor Mueller	554	5.43
Dave Capar	381	3.74

North Kildonan
Candidate	Votes	%
Jeff Browaty (X)	11,840	78.39
Evan Comstock	1,914	12.67
Andrew Podolecki	1,350	8.94

Old Kildonan
Candidate	Votes	%
Devi Sharma (X)	5,944	40.69
Suzanne Hrynyk	5,732	39.24
Donovan Martin	2,932	20.07

Point Douglas
Candidate	Votes	%
Mike Pagtakhan (X)	4,701	46.13
Rebecca Chartrand	2,024	19.86
Anthony Ramos	1,871	18.36
Dale White	1,165	11.43
Anne Thompson	429	4.21

River Heights-Fort Garry
Candidate	Votes	%
John Orlikow (X)	11,856	55.90
Taz Stuart	9,355	44.10

St. Boniface
Candidate	Votes	%
Matt Allard	15,355	73.01
Ryan Davies	3,939	18.73
Brad Gross	961	4.57
Paul Najda	775	3.69

St. Charles
Candidate	Votes	%
Shawn Dobson	5,040	38.53
Grant Nordman (X)	3,972	30.36
Eric Holland	2,129	16.28
Don Woodstock	905	6.92
Dwight Hildebrandt	791	6.05
Geoff Borden	244	1.87

St. James-Brooklands
Candidate	Votes	%
Scott Gillingham	5,174	43.69
Bryan Metcalfe	3,548	29.96
Stefan Jonasson	2,292	19.35
Fred Morris	828	6.99

St. Norbert
Candidate	Votes	%
Janice Lukes	10,719	58.10
Sachit Mehra	6,631	35.94
Joe Chan	1,098	5.95

St. Vital
Candidate	Votes	%
Brian Mayes (X)	14,128	70.40
Glenn Churchill	3,999	19.93
Steven Hennessey	1,940	9.67

Transcona
Candidate	Votes	%
Russ Wyatt (X)	8,490	61.77
Ray Ulasy	4,277	31.12
Blessing Feschuk	507	3.69
George Baars-Wilhelm	470	3.42
