= Southdale (electoral district) =

Provincial electoral district in Manitoba, Canada

Coordinates: 49.843°N 97.067°W

Manitoba electoral district
- Location in Winnipeg

Provincial electoral district
- Legislature: Legislative Assembly of Manitoba
MLA
Renée Cable
New Democratic
- District created: 1998
- First contested: 1999
- Last contested: 2023

Southdale is a provincial electoral district of Manitoba, Canada. It was created in the provincial redistribution 1999, mostly out of Niakwa and part of St. Vital. The riding is located in the southeastern section of the city of Winnipeg.

Southdale is bordered on the east by the rural ridings of La Verendrye and Springfield, to the south by Seine River, to the north by Radisson and St. Boniface, and to the west by Riel and St. Vital.

The riding's population in 1996 was 19,029. Its character is mostly middle class. In 1999, the average family income was $68,944, and the unemployment rate was 5.00%. Twelve per cent of Southdale's residents are francophone. Health and social service work accounts for 14% of Southdale's industry.

From 2003 to 2007, Southdale was the only riding in southeastern Winnipeg to be represented by a Progressive Conservative, following historical breakthroughs by the New Democratic Party of Manitoba (NDP) in surrounding ridings in the 2003 provincial election. The NDP proceeded to oust incumbent MLA Jack Reimer in the 2007 provincial election, completing their sweep of Southeast Winnipeg. The seat remained NDP from 2007 until 2016 when it returned to the PCs.

== Members of the Legislative Assembly ==
Manitoba MLAs for the electoral district of Southdale
Term of office	Name	Political party
1999–2007	Jack Reimer	Progressive Conservative
2007–2016	Erin Selby	New Democrats
2016–2019	Andrew Smith	Progressive Conservative
2019–2023	Audrey Gordon	Progressive Conservative
2023–present	Renée Cable	New Democrats

== Electoral results ==
2023 Manitoba general election
Party	Candidate	Votes	%	±%	Expenditures
New Democratic	Renée Cable	5,569	48.48	+10.64	$44,447.54
Progressive Conservative	Audrey Gordon	3,922	34.14	-8.26	$50,821.24
Liberal	Robert Falcon Ouellette	1,861	16.20	+2.73	$17,836.49
Independent	Amarjit Singh	135	1.18	–	$5,835.09
Total valid votes/expense limit		11,487	99.65	–	$69,403.00
Total rejected and declined ballots		40	0.35	–	
Turnout		11,527	64.72	+3.06	
Eligible voters		17,810			
New Democratic gain from Progressive Conservative		Swing		+9.45	
Source(s) Source: Elections Manitoba

2019 Manitoba general election
Party	Candidate	Votes	%	±%	Expenditures
Progressive Conservative	Audrey Gordon	4,493	42.40	-9.2	$24,558.56
New Democratic	Karen Myshkowsky	4,010	37.84	+6.9	$14,122.65
Liberal	Spencer Duncanson	1,427	13.47	-3.3	$137.10
Green	Katherine Quinton	595	5.62	+4.8	$0.00
Manitoba Forward	Robert Cairns	71	0.67	New	$0.00
Total valid votes		10,596	99.33		
Total rejected ballots		72	0.67		
Turnout		10,668	61.66		
Eligible voters		17,301			
Progressive Conservative hold		Swing		-8.1	
Source: STATEMENT OF OFFICIAL RESULTS BY VOTING AREA (PDF) (Report). Elections Manitoba. 2019.

2016 provincial election redistributed results
Party	%
Progressive Conservative	51.6
New Democratic	30.9
Liberal	16.8
Green	0.8

2016 Manitoba general election
Party	Candidate	Votes	%	±%	Expenditures
Progressive Conservative	Andrew Smith	6,663	63.82	+18.83	$43,062.01
New Democratic	Dashi Zargani	2,460	23.56	-28.45	$19,423.93
Liberal	Ryan Colyer	1,318	12.62	+9.62	$1,526.57
Total valid votes/expense limit		10,441	97.78	-	$53,274.00
Total rejected ballots		237	2.22	+1.90	
Turnout		10,678	62.31	-7.82	
Eligible voters		17,137			
Progressive Conservative gain from New Democratic		Swing		+23.64	
Source: Elections Manitoba

2011 Manitoba general election
Party	Candidate	Votes	%	Expenditures
New Democratic	Erin Selby	5,662	51.84	$29,012.79
Progressive Conservative	Judy Eastman	4,898	44.85	$36,267.68
Liberal	Amarjit Singh	327	2.99	$3,107.04
Total valid votes/expense limit		10,887	100.00	$43,733.00
Total rejected ballots		35	0.41	
Turnout		10,922	70.13	+4.39
Eligible voters		15,574		
New Democratic hold		Swing		-2.96
Source: Elections Manitoba

2007 Manitoba general election
Party	Candidate	Votes	%	Expenditures
New Democratic	Erin Selby	5,772	51.04	$30,198.49
Progressive Conservative	Jack Reimer	4,493	39.74	$31,445.97
Liberal	Don Woodstock	1,042	9.22	$4,974.42
Total valid votes/expense limit		11,307	100.00	
Total rejected ballots		44		
Turnout		11,351	65.74	+9.78
Eligible voters		17,267		
New Democratic gain		Swing		+13.32%

2003 Manitoba general election
Party	Candidate	Votes	%	±%	Expenditures
Progressive Conservative	Jack Reimer	4,422	51.03	-0.13	$16,203.32
New Democratic	Carolyn Frost	3,123	36.05	+8.77	$4,844.51
Liberal	Chuck Mrena	1,120	12.93	-6.43	$5,828.49
Total valid votes/expense limit		8,665	100.00		
Total rejected ballots		27			
Turnout		8,692	55.96	-18.60	
Eligible voters		15,533			
Progressive Conservative hold		Swing		-4.45%	

1999 Manitoba general election
Party	Candidate	Votes	%	Expenditures
Progressive Conservative	Jack Reimer	5,455	51.16	$25,319.24
New Democratic	Iris Taylor	2,909	27.28	$1,907.00
Liberal	Shirley Chaput	2,064	19.36	$10,349.79
Manitoba	Paul Gibson	200	1.88	$1,067.54
Total valid votes/expense limit		10,618	100.00	
Total rejected ballots		45		
Turnout		10,663	74.56	
Eligible voters		14,301		

== Previous boundaries ==
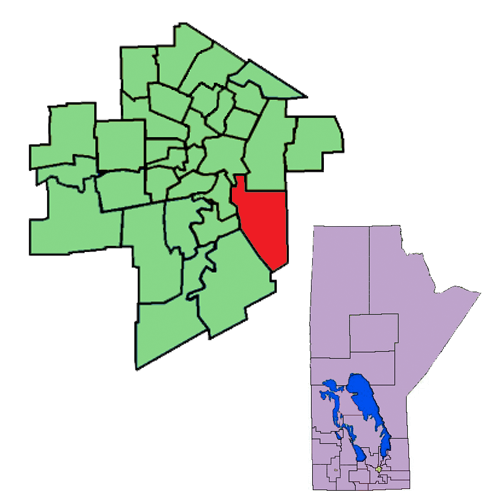
The 1999–2011 boundaries for Southdale highlighted in red.

== See also ==
- List of Manitoba provincial electoral districts
- Canadian provincial electoral districts
