= Brian Bowman (politician) =

43rd mayor of Winnipeg (born 1971)

The Honourable Brian Bowman
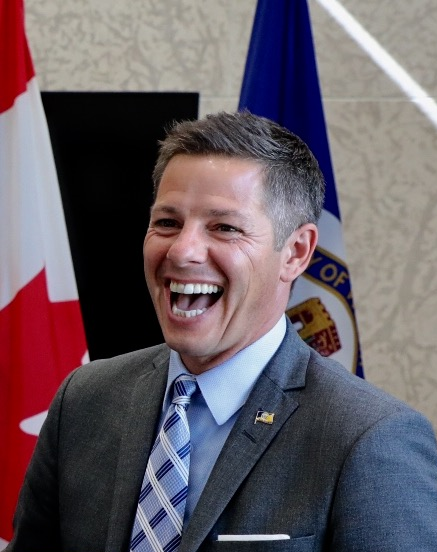
- Bowman in 2017

43rd Mayor of Winnipeg
- In office November 4, 2014 – November 1, 2022
- Preceded by: Sam Katz
- Succeeded by: Scott Gillingham

Judge of Court of King's Bench of Manitoba
- Incumbent
- Assumed office March 2, 2024

Personal details
- Born: Brian Thomas Douglas Bowman; August 18, 1971 (age 55) Winnipeg, Manitoba, Canada
- Party: Independent
- Other political affiliations: Progressive Conservative
- Spouse: Tracy Bowman (m. 2004)
- Children: 2
- Education: University of Manitoba (BA); University of Toronto (JD)
- Occupation: Politician
- Profession: Lawyer

Brian Thomas Douglas Bowman (born August 18, 1971) is a Canadian politician, lawyer, and judge, who was the 43rd mayor of Winnipeg from 2014 to 2022. He was first elected in the 2014 municipal election and was re-elected mayor for a second term in October 2018, increasing his plurality from 47% in the last election to a majority of 53%. Bowman was sworn in as a judge of the Court of King's Bench of Manitoba in March 2024.

== Early and personal life ==
Bowman is a self-identified Métis, and is the first mayor of aboriginal descent in the city's history. Bowman attended Shaftesbury High School in Winnipeg. He worked as a privacy lawyer prior to entering the municipal election in 2014. Bowman was a partner with Pitblado Law for 11 years. During his time with Pitblado, he became a recognized leader in the emerging fields of social media, access to information, and privacy law. He also served Winnipeg in other leadership capacities including chair of the Winnipeg Art Gallery and the Winnipeg Chamber of Commerce boards of directors.

== Politics ==
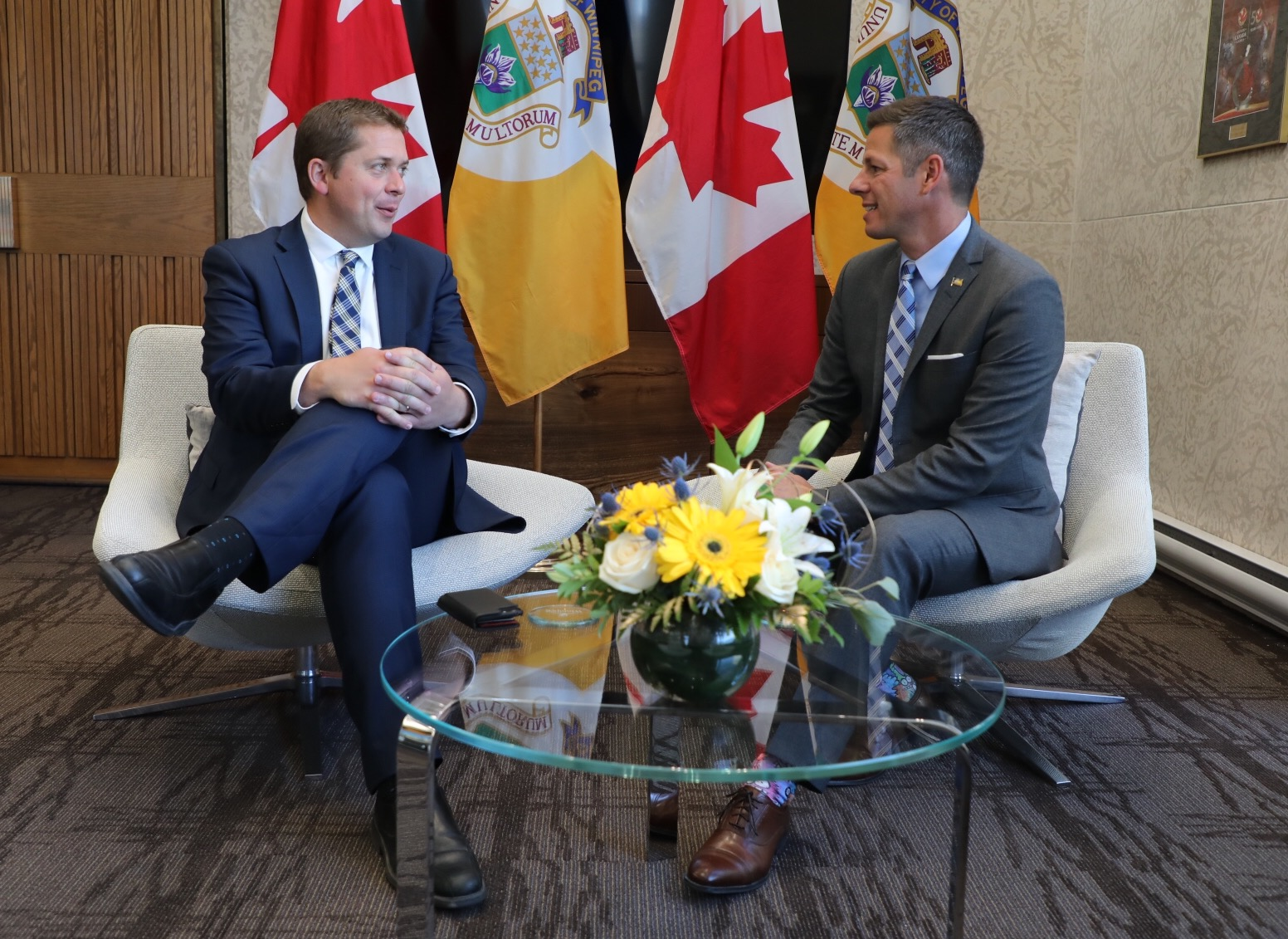
Bowman meeting with former leader of the Conservative Party, Andrew Scheer

He has been involved in the Progressive Conservative Party of Manitoba, although he has never held elected office prior to his election to the mayoralty. Bowman publicly campaigned in 2014 on opening Portage and Main to pedestrians, and instead put the decision to a referendum in 2018 where it was defeated.

== Mayor of Winnipeg (2014–2022) ==
Brian Bowman was sworn in on November 4, 2014 as the 43rd Mayor of the City of Winnipeg. Since becoming Mayor, Brian Bowman has overseen steady and strong population and economic growth in Winnipeg. Population growth in Winnipeg is projected to grow steadily and strongly over the next 25 years toward a population of one million people. Bowman has cited the importance of positioning and preparing the city for this level of growth to ensure services are available to residents when they're needed. He also made this a key part of this first election campaign.

=== City building ===
Coming into office in his first term, Bowman committed to various city building activities that were neglected in previous years. In January 2015 shortly after being elected, Bowman with Council approved the City's Asset Management Policy, followed by the development of the City of Winnipeg's first ever Asset Management Plan which was released in 2018. This ongoing program helps the City of Winnipeg accurately manage its various holdings including roads, parks, water and sewer utilities, information technology and many more. A report is published annually summarizing the current state of the City of Winnipeg's assets to provide direction for investment in the future. The mayor has also overseen a reduction of the City of Winnipeg's infrastructure deficit through strategic investments such as increased funding to road construction and rehabilitation on local and regional roads to record levels every year in office. His first year in office saw a funding increase of 22.7% over the previous year to $103 million. Subsequent years saw further increases in the roads budget. One of the major road infrastructure projects supported by the increase of investment in road infrastructure was the Waverley Underpass project, which was completed under budget and ahead of schedule in August 2019. These investments have been supported by an increase in property taxes by 2.33% each year since 2015. The City of Winnipeg municipal residential property taxes continue to be the lowest compared to other large Canadian cities. Other significant projects include the Empress Street and Overpass Reconstruction and Rehabilitation, the Fermor Avenue Reconstruction & Widening Project, the Pembina Highway Rehabilitation and Buffered Bike Lane Project and the Taché Promenade project. Citizen satisfaction has increased in regards to the condition of major streets and residential streets since 2017.

Infrastructure projects within new developments in Winnipeg were being supported by the Impact Fee, initiated by Bowman and approved by Council on October 26, 2016. The purpose of this fee was to support the costs of growth within the City of Winnipeg. A portion of the revenue collected was promised by Bowman to be directed towards the construction of a new community center in the Waverly West neighborhood of Winnipeg. The Impact Fee in its form as passed by Council was deemed to exceed the City of Winnipeg's authority. Despite this, the judge ruled that suburban growth did not pay for the increased load on City infrastructure and services. The Judge also found that "the city had the power or authority to enact" the impact fee by-law though just not in its current form. The result of this case was that the approximately $30 million collected by the City of Winnipeg would have to be returned to residents.

As a means to find more durable solutions for municipal infrastructure construction in the City, Bowman initiated the creation of a Municipal Infrastructure Chair at the University of Manitoba. This position will focus research on road building and road construction materials. The City of Winnipeg contributed $250 000 over a span of five years to fund this program.

Bowman also supported the City of Winnipeg's Library Facility Redevelopment Strategy that saw the renovation and renewal of the St. Vital, St. John's Library, Cornish Library. This plan also further put in motion the construction of the now open Windsor Park Library and Transcona Library with construction underway on the Bill and Helen Norrie Library.

While in office, Bowman has supported various Transit related projects in Winnipeg. This began by promising in his 2014 campaign to complete the entire Winnipeg Bus Rapid Transit network by 2030. He supported the second phase of the Southwest Transitway, extending existing transit infrastructure down Pembina Highway to the University of Manitoba. This transitway officially opened on April 12, 2020 during the COVID-19 pandemic. The Transitway also had an accompanying active transportation component that allows residents to travel from South Winnipeg to Downtown on protected pathways. Bowman further voted for the creation of the Transit Master Plan, a guiding document for the future of Winnipeg's transit system, including the Rapid Transit network. During his re-election campaign, Bowman committed to install 55 new heated bus shelters and funds were subsequently allocated for this project in the 2019 Budget. City Council further directed in 2019 that protective shields for bus drivers be purchased and installed on all Winnipeg Transit busses by the end of 2019. This project was initiated after the death of on-duty transit operator Irvine Jubal Fraser.

Bowman has pushed for investments in active transportation, supporting the Winnipeg Pedestrian and Cycling Strategies Report presented to Council in December 2014 as well as increasing the number of bike lanes in the City. While in office, the mayor has also supported annual pedestrian and cycling action plans. Council, including Bowman, further supported an increase in budget for active transportation by 57% in 2017 over the previous year. Since taking office, total amounts allocated for active transportation have ranged between $2.4 million and $6 million per year. Also under Bowman, residents can now see the stages of all active transportation projects underway in one location through the City of Winnipeg website.

During his re-election campaign, Bowman committed to increase funds available for community center renovations to $2 million annually over a period of five years. These funds were allocated in the 2019 Budget.

Due to a lack of dog parks available to citizens in the downtown area, Bowman committed to build a new park in this neighborhood. Bonnycastle Park was selected as the location for the park, with construction completed in 2017 at a cost of $400,000. Bowman also supported the Off-Leash Dog Area's Master Plan, a guiding and strategy document for future development of new off-leash facilities in Winnipeg.

Also in the downtown area, Bowman supported the demolition and redevelopment of the Public Safety Building and Civic Parkade lands adjacent to City Hall. The preparation for demolition of the former Public Safety Building and Civic Parkade began in the fall of 2018 after Council approval. Demolition was completed in the summer of 2020. Council, including Bowman, endorsed a vision document that outlined redevelopment for the site which includes space for a public market, 108 non-profit rental housing units, and public space.

Bowman has also pushed for the lands adjacent to The Forks, known as Parcel 4 and Railside to be redeveloped, and voted for the "Railside at The Forks" concept plan that was submitted to Council.

In the fall of 2019, Bowman initiated the One Million Tree Challenge with the goal of planting one million trees before the Winnipeg reached one million residents. Not-for profit organizations Tree Canada and Trees Winnipeg administer the program. The program has already received over $1.25 million in donations from businesses Canadian National Railway and Telpay. 2000 trees were planted at Mazenod Park in Winnipeg's Transcona neighborhood in 2020. In the 2020-2023 multi-year budget, Winnipeg City Council allocated $25 million to the Urban Forest Enhancement Program and Reforestation Improvements over the five year.

Bowman's tenure has also seen a high level of investment in water and waste infrastructure. He has overseen improvements to the South End Sewage Treatment Plant(handling 20% of the city's wastewater) and the North End Sewage Treatment Plant (handling 70% of the city's wastewater). The total cost to upgrade the North End Plant is estimated to be $1.8 billion. The City of Winnipeg also invests approximately $30 million per year on the replacement of combined sewers with separated sewers to reduce the number of overflow incidents into the surrounding waterways.

In July 2020, the City of Winnipeg also initiated a composting pilot program at a cost of $1.8 million. The program collects food waste from 4000 households. This was initiated as a means to reduce emissions from the Brady landfill and meet waste diversion targets set previously of 50% diversion from landfill. Citizen satisfaction has risen with garbage collection from 83% in 2016 to 94% in 2020. Service deficiencies per 10 000 collections have also decreased from 12.2 in 2016 to 0.9 in 2019. Citizen satisfaction has also risen with recycling collection from 81% in 2016 to 88% in 2020.

== Judicial career ==
In December 2022, Bowman was appointed as a judge of the Manitoba Court of King's Bench, with his swearing in taking place in March 2024.

== Electoral record ==
2014 Winnipeg Mayoral Election
Candidate	Votes	%
(x) Brian Bowman	111,504	47.54
Judy Wasylycia-Leis	58,440	24.29
Robert-Falcon Ouellette	36,823	15.70
Gord Steeves	21,080	8.99
David Sanders	3,718	1.59
Paula Havixbeck	2,083	0.89
Michel Fillion	898	0.38

2018 Winnipeg Mayoral Election
Candidate	Votes	%
(x) Brian Bowman	114,222	53.3
Motkaluk, Jenny	76,554	35.7
Diack, Tim	10,548	4.9
Woodstock, Don	4,738	2.2
Wilson, Doug	3,527	1.6
Hayat, Umar	2,229	1.0
Ackerman, Ed	1,697	0.8
Machiraju, Venkat	788	0.4
