= Ernie Gilroy =

Canadian politician (born 1948)

Winnipeg City Councillor
- In office 1989–1992
- Constituency: Daniel McIntyre
- In office 1986–1989
- Constituency: Sargent Park

Personal details
- Born: 6 October 1948 (age 77)
- Party: Liberal
- Children: Cindy Gilroy

Ernie Gilroy (born 1948) is an administrator and politician in Manitoba, Canada. He was a member of the Winnipeg City Council from 1986 to 1992, and was a member of the city's executive policy committee (i.e. the municipal cabinet) during Bill Norrie's administration. Gilroy is also a senior organizer with the Manitoba Liberal Party, and ran under the party's banner in the 1990 provincial election. Since 2004, he has been the leader of the Manitoba Floodway Authority.

== Early life and career ==
Gilroy was born on 6 October 1948. He holds a certificate in management and administration from the Canadian Institute of Management through the University of Manitoba. He is an insurance salesman in private life, and was a board member of the Insurance Brokers Association of Manitoba in 1997–98 and 1999–2000. In 1998, he raised concerns about proposed bank mergers when testifying before a federal Liberal Party task force on financial services. Gilroy has also served as Winnipeg chairman of Save The Children Canada, and has been a board member of the Winnipeg Symphony Orchestra. He was appointed to the board of directors of the Royal Canadian Mint in 1998.

Gilroy's daughter, Cindy Gilroy, was elected as a Winnipeg Division One School Trustee in 2006 and was later elected as City Councillor for Daniel McIntyre in the 2014 municipal elections.

== Municipal politics ==
Gilroy was elected to the Winnipeg City Council for the Sargent Park ward in 1986, defeating New Democratic Party candidate George Slobodzian by just under 300 votes. He was re-elected in 1989, for the redistributed ward of Daniel McIntyre. Widely respected for his abilities in government, Gilroy served in Mayor Bill Norrie's cabinet during the late 1980s and early 1990s. He chaired the Planning and Community Services Committee, the Finance and Administration Committee and the Protection Parks and Culture Committee, as well as chairing a planning committee in 1991–92 that produced the report, Plan Winnipeg: Toward 2010.

Gilroy was chairman of the Winnipeg Convention Centre board in the early 1990s, and took part in discussions to build a new arena for the Winnipeg Jets hockey team. He supported a plan to build an arena called "Manitoba Gardens" in the city's downtown, and favoured the use of private-sector money rather than requiring the team's majority owners to contribute. These discussions were ultimately unsuccessful, and the Jets left the city later in the decade. Gilroy was also chosen as the City of Winnipeg's representative on the board of the Sargent-Ellice Business Improvement Zone in 1991.

Gilroy ran for Mayor of Winnipeg in 1992, highlighting his work for a new downtown arena. He criticized rival candidates Susan Thompson and David Brown for promising to introduce a tax freeze, saying that this would be impossible in the wake of reduced funding from the provincial and federal governments. He was supported by five Liberal Members of Parliament, and by the Winnipeg Police Association. He finished fourth against Thompson on election day.

In 1993, Gilroy successfully lobbied to have a new community centre on Langside Street after former councillor Magnus Eliason. He supported Terry Duguid in the 1995 mayoral election.

Glen Murray was elected as Winnipeg's mayor in the 1998 municipal election, and appointed Gilroy to serve on his transition team. He later named Gilroy as the secretary of Winnipeg's executive policy committee. Gilroy was eventually recognized as the most powerful behind-the-scenes negotiator in Murray's administration. One civil servant indicated that he was a good choice to create links between elected politicians and the city bureaucracy, although some accused him of controlling the mayor's agenda. Gilroy later worked on Murray's behalf in the federal St. Boniface riding, scouting out possible supporters if the mayor chose to run as a Liberal candidate in a 2002 by-election. Murray ultimately chose not to run in that riding. Gilroy stepped down from his position in 2003.

== Provincial and federal politics ==
Gilroy was campaign manager for the Manitoba Liberal Party in the 1986 and 1988 provincial elections, and was chairman of the party's election readiness committee in the buildup to the 1990 election. He ran for the party in the latter election, and finished second against New Democratic Party candidate Becky Barrett in the north-end Winnipeg division of Wellington.

Gilroy was appointed chair of the Manitoba Liberal Party's convention organizing committee in 1993, as delegates were chosen to elect a successor to outgoing leader Sharon Carstairs. He resigned in protest, however, when a hastily called meeting of the provincial executive committee extended the deadline for mail-in ballots. This was widely regarded as favouring Paul Edwards over rival candidate Kevin Lamoureux. Gilroy later returned to his position, after taking part in compromise discussions with the two candidates. He was again called to stand-in as interim chair of the provincial Liberal campaign in 1995, when original manager Allister Gunson was forced to leave the province on business.

Gilroy worked on David Walker's successful re-election campaign in the 1993 federal election, and was Rey Pagtakhan's campaign manager in 1997. He managed Jerry Fontaine's bid to lead the provincial Liberal Party in 1998.

Gilroy served as returning officer for the northern Churchill riding in the buildup to the 2000. He resigned following allegations that he dismissed a complaint from Ron Evans about disputed memberships sold by rival candidate Elijah Harper; Gilroy was also reported to have told Evans that he should withdraw because he had no chance of winning. A party official said that Gilroy resigned to avoid the appearance of unfairness.

== Administrator ==
Shortly after stepping down as an aide to Glen Murray, Gilroy was appointed by the provincial government to serve as chair of the Floodway Expansion Interim Management Authority. He wrote a guest editorial in support of the floodway extension for the Winnipeg Free Press newspaper in February 2004. The following month, he was appointed as chair of the newly created Manitoba Floodway Authority, which overseas floodway design, environmental licensing, and construction. Gilroy announced a five-year expansion plan in May 2005. He defended a master labour agreement worked out for the floodway project, arguing that it would allow for cost certainty and labour peace. A 2007 report in the Winnipeg Free Press indicated that construction was both on time and on budget. Gilroy defended a wage increase in this period, arguing that it was necessary to keep workers from moving to Alberta and British Columbia.

1992 Winnipeg mayoral election
Candidate	Votes	Percentage
Susan Thompson	89,743	39.01%
Greg Selinger	75,123	32.66%
Dave Brown	31,859	13.85%
Ernie Gilroy	26,001	11.30%
Natalie Pollock	1,311	0.57%
Dan Zyluk	833	0.36%
Darryl Soshycki	727	0.32%
Walter Diawol	553	0.24%
Menardo A. Caneda	534	0.23%
Martin Barnes	526	0.23%
James W. Miller (Pin The Elder)	500	0.22%
Bryan R. Benson	491	0.21%
Bob McGugan	433	0.19%
Charles-Alwyn Scotlend	421	0.18%
Ed Hay	374	0.16%
Aurel Joseph Prefontaine	348	0.15%
Rudolph Parker	267	0.12%
Total	230,044	100.00%
