= Roman Yereniuk =

Canadian educator and public official

- Occupations: Scholar, academic administrator
- Board member of: Winnipeg School Division (1989–1995; 1998–2006)

Academic background
- Education: St. Andrew's College, Manitoba; McGill University; Pontifical Oriental Institute

Academic work
- Discipline: Religious studies; history
- Institutions: St. Andrew's College, Manitoba

Roman Yereniuk is an educator and former public official in Winnipeg, Manitoba, Canada. He has been the principal of St. Andrew's College at the University of Manitoba, and was a trustee with the Winnipeg School Board from 1989 to 1995 and again from 1998 to 2006. He has also run for the House of Commons of Canada on two occasions, as a candidate of the New Democratic Party. Yereniuk is a prominent member of Winnipeg's Ukrainian-Canadian community.

== Educator and community leader ==
Yereniuk started working for St. Andrew's College in 1972, and became its principal in 1988. He no longer holds the latter office, although he continues to serve as an associate professor of theology. He also teaches religion at the Center for Ukrainian Canadian Studies at the University of Manitoba. He has served as president of the Ukrainian Canadian Congress-Winnipeg Branch, and is its national treasurer for the 2004–2007 term. He has also been a board member of the Canada-Ukraine Foundation and head of the Christian and Heritage Education Committee of the Ukrainian Orthodox Church of Canada.

Yereniuk has written extensively about the Ukrainian-Canadian community, in such fields as Ukrainians in politics and the Ukrainian Orthodox faith. He has been vice-chairman of the board of Ukrainian Voice newspaper, and helped oversee the release of the video "Headlines: 90 years of the Ukrainian Voice Weekly" in 2001. In 1990, he co-authored a book entitled Monuments to Faith: Ukrainian Churches in Manitoba, released by the University of Manitoba Press. He later issued a video entitled "The Theotokos in the Ukrainian Religious Tradition", studying icons in Ukrainian religious culture. In 2002, he donated two 16 mm film reels of a 1935 rally in Saskatoon, Saskatchewan of the Canadian Ukrainian Youth Association to the University of Manitoba Archives & Special Collections.

Yereniuk has also been active in the labour movement, and has served as vice-president of the Canadian Union of Public Employees local 3909. He was an international observer to the 2004 Ukrainian presidential election and the 2006 Ukrainian parliamentary election.

== School trustee ==
Winnipeg's school board has nine trustees, elected in multi-member wards. Yereniuk first sought election to the board's third ward in 1986, but was narrowly defeated for the final position. He tried again in 1989 and won, and was re-elected in 1992. After the election, he caucused with the New Democratic Party group of trustees.

Yereniuk served as a Regional Director of the Manitoba Association of School Trustees in 1993–1994. In 1994, he voted against a proposal to teach greater tolerance toward homosexuals in Winnipeg schools. Yereniuk indicated that he believed homosexuality should be addressed in schools "with dignity and sensitivity", but argued that it was the responsibility of the provincial government to bring it into the curriculum. He was narrowly defeated in the 1995 municipal election, losing the final position in Ward Three to Luba Fedorkiw. He later began a court challenge against the election of Mike Babinsky, another successful candidate, on the grounds that he had not fulfilled Winnipeg's residency requirements. He dropped the challenge in May 1996, citing financial strain.

Yereniuk returned to the school board in the 1998 election, as the school board shifted to the left. In 1999, he supported a proposal to rehire the city's truant officers. He later opposed the imposition of province-wide language arts exams for grades six and nine, and in 2001 suggested introducing Ukrainian-language arts courses for grades nine through twelve at a central location in Winnipeg.

He was re-elected in 2002, and supported a controversial pay raise the following year. In 2003, he called for the Winnipeg School Division to become a partner in the proposed Canadian Museum for Human Rights. He later endorsed a complete ban on smoking in the Winnipeg School Division.

In 2005, Yereniuk was one of three trustees to vote in favour of introducing major changes to the Winnipeg School Board's system of election. He was defeated in the 2006 election, again losing the third position in Ward Three.

== Federal candidate ==
Yereniuk campaigned for the federal New Democratic Party in the 1997 and 2000 elections, in Winnipeg—St. Paul. On both occasions, he lost to Liberal incumbent Rey Pagtakhan.

== Electoral record ==
Electoral record
Election	Division	Party	Votes	%	Place	Winner
1986 Winnipeg municipal	Winnipeg School Board, Ward Three	n/a (New Democratic Party)	3,770		4/12	Edward Kowalchuk, Irene Haigh, and Isobel Sudol
1989 Winnipeg municipal	Winnipeg School Board, Ward Three	n/a (New Democratic Party)	5,527		3/6	Irene Haigh, Edward Kowalchuk, and himself
1992 Winnipeg municipal	Winnipeg School Board, Ward Three	n/a (New Democratic Party)	6,601		2/11	Edward Kowalchuk, himself, and Bill Sanderson
1995 Winnipeg municipal	Winnipeg School Board, Ward Three	n/a (New Democratic Party)	4,578		4/16	Mike Babinsky, Liz Ambrose, and Luba Fedorkiw
1997 federal	Winnipeg North—St. Paul	New Democratic Party	9,487		2/6	Rey Pagtakhan, Liberal
1998 Winnipeg municipal	Winnipeg School Board, Ward Three	n/a (New Democratic Party)	6,254		2/11	Mike Babinsky, himself, and Liz Ambrose
2000 federal	Winnipeg North—St. Paul	New Democratic Party	7,931		3/8	Rey Pagtakhan, Liberal
2002 Winnipeg municipal	Winnipeg School Board, Ward Three	n/a (New Democratic Party)	5,918	13.02	3/10	Mike Babinsky, Liz Ambrose, and himself
2006 Winnipeg municipal	Winnipeg School Board, Ward Three	n/a (New Democratic Party)	5,133		4/6	Mike Babinsky, Suzanne Hrynyk, and Sonia Prevost-Derbecker
