= Independent candidates in the 1990 Manitoba provincial election =

There were several independent candidates in the 1990 Manitoba provincial election. Information about these candidates may be found on this page.

== Candidates ==
=== Point Douglas: William Hawryluk ===
William Hawryluk was a perennial candidate for political office in Winnipeg. He received 108 votes (2.0%), finishing fourth against New Democratic Party candidate George Hickes.

=== Point Douglas: Roy Price ===
Roy Price was a businessman, civic activist and perennial candidate in north-end Winnipeg. He was the owner of Harmony Music, and served as president of the Norquay Community Centre in 1991.

Price opposed several social outreach programs in north-end Winnipeg, claiming that they brought unwelcome persons into the region. He spoke out against a Christian mission soup kitchen for this reason in 1998, and subsequently opposed a needle exchange program. In 1994, he complained about "satanic and obscene" graffiti in Winnipeg's subway system.

He first ran for the Manitoba legislature in the 1988 provincial election, in the constituency of St. Johns. He received 68 votes, finishing fifth against New Democratic Party incumbent Judy Wasylycia-Leis. He received 66 votes (1.3%) in 1990, finishing fifth against NDP candidate George Hickes. Price also campaigned for the Winnipeg School Board in 1992, 1995 and 1998, and lost all times.

Price died on March 4, 2002, at age 71.

=== Wellington: Walter Diawol ===
Walter Diawol (died November 1994) was a gadfly candidate for public office in the late 1980s and early 1990s. He was a junk collector, and fought an extended battle with the City of Winnipeg over his failure to clean up his property. The city removed his garbage collection (over his objections) in 1985, 1986, 1987 and 1993, and took title of his house on the last occasion. A newspaper report indicates that Winnipeg officials needed "nine five-ton truckloads and three garbage truckloads to clear his property of dead batteries, scrap wood, broken lawn chairs, broken TVs and headboards and box springs" in the July 1993 cleanup. Diawol was not forced to leave the house, however, and continued to reside there until his death in 1994. When questioned, Diawol said that junk was his hobby.

Electoral record
Election	Division	Party	Votes	%	Place	Winner
1989 Winnipeg municipal	Mayor of Winnipeg	n/a	1,530	1.08	9/10	Bill Norrie
1990 provincial	Wellington	Independent	68	0.90	5/6	Becky Barrett, New Democratic Party
1992 Winnipeg municipal	Mayor of Winnipeg	n/a	553	0.24	8/17	Susan Thompson

=== Wellington: Stephen Keki ===
Stephen Keki ran for political office at the federal, provincial and municipal levels four times between 1986 and 1990. He identified himself as a meat processor during the 1988 federal election.

Electoral record
Election	Division	Party	Votes	%	Place	Winner
1986 Winnipeg municipal	Council, Springfield Heights	n/a	81	1.46	6/6	Shirley Timm-Rudolph
1988 federal	Winnipeg North	Independent	214		5/7	Rey Pagtakhan, Liberal
1989 Winnipeg municipal	Council, Redboine	n/a	95		7/7	Joseph Yuen
1990 provincial	Wellington	Independent	35	0.46	6/6	Becky Barrett, New Democratic Party
