= Mario Santos =

Portuguese-Canadian lawyer and public official

Mário Jorge Santos (born 19 July 1952 in Portugal) is a lawyer and a former public official in Winnipeg, Manitoba, Canada. He was a prominent member of the Winnipeg School Board from 1982 to 2002, and has sought election to the Legislative Assembly of Manitoba on two occasions.

== Early life and career ==
Mário Jorge Santos was born in Portugal and moved to Canada in 1968. He has worked as a civil and criminal lawyer, and operated a tax consulting business during his time as a school trustee. Santos is a Roman Catholic, and has served as chairman of the pastoral council at Immaculate Conception Church in Winnipeg. He describes himself as a staunch supporter of public education.

== Trustee ==
Mário Jorge Santos was first elected to the Winnipeg School Board's second ward in a by-election following the death of Inez Stevenson. He was returned in the 1983 municipal election, and again in 1986, 1989, 1992, 1995 and 1998. He did not seek re-election in 2002.

Early years

Mário Jorge Santos helped in the foundation of the Manitoba Association for the Preservation of Ancestral Languages in 1983, to advocate for the teaching of languages other than English and French. He served as school board chairman during his first full term, and defended a controversial pay increase for trustees (which followed a review by Manitoba Appeal Court Judge Charles Huband). He later supported the removal of mandatory prayer from schools.

Finance chair

Mário Jorge Santos chaired the Winnipeg School Board's finance committee for most of the 1990s, and conducted several rounds of funding negotiations with the provincial government. He became known as a champion of divisional autonomy from provincial control, and often criticized the Gary Filmon government's approach to education. He oversaw significant spending cuts to the school division's employee budget in 1995, during a period of general economic restructuring in Canada. Mário Jorge Santos said that he took no pleasure in the decision, but added that it was necessary to protect classroom programs. He described teacher demands for wage and benefit increases in this period as unreasonable.

Mário Jorge Santos was appointed as the school division's vice-chairman following the 1995 election, while also retaining his position as Finance Chairman. He presided over a further round of spending cuts in 1997, again reluctantly, in an attempt to minimize tax increases.

Division chair and after

Mário Jorge Santos was selected for a one-year term as division chairman in late 1997. In this capacity, he helped negotiate long-standing salary and human rights disputes with Winnipeg teachers. He also criticized the province's increasing reliance on standardized tests, arguing that they were inappropriate for measuring the needs of at-risk students.

He stood down as chairman after the 1998 election, and was reappointed as finance chairman later in the term. In 2002, he announced that the Winnipeg School Division would freeze school property taxes for the first time in recent memory. He announced his retirement in 2002, after serving for twenty years.

Social issues

In 1994, Mário Jorge Santos voted against a motion to study the integration of anti-homophobia tolerance lessons into Winnipeg classrooms. He argued that his position was not premised in homophobic beliefs, and said that he had previously lobbied to have sexual orientation included as a protected category in the Manitoba Human Rights Code. His position was that anti-discrimination should be taught generally, and not targeted to specific groups.

He later spoke out against the creation of an anti-homophobia education committee, when the subject was revisited in 1999. On this occasion, Mário Jorge Santos argued that his objections were with the ad hoc nature of the committee and not with the larger rights issue. He later indicated that anti-homophobia measures would be addressed through the division's policy-program committee, which he himself chaired. The end result was another program that was focused on general anti-discrimination, rather than what Mário Jorge Santos described as "the blessing of a lifestyle". He nevertheless gave his cautious support to the introduction of anti-homophobia literature in 2001.

Mário Jorge Santos defended his division's affirmative action policies in 1997, saying that they were achieving real success in hiring women to administrative positions.

Mário Jorge Santos was an opponent of video monitoring in schools throughout his career, arguing it would give schools the appearance of prisons. He also opposed student locker searches in 2000.

Other

In 1999, Mário Jorge Santos proposed a motion to have professional wrestlers deliver anti-drug and stay-in-school messages to children in the Winnipeg School Division. He also objected to a Winnipeg School Board's recommendation that after-school wrestling programs be moved to a different time slot. Mário Jorge Santos indicated that he was not a fan of sports entertainment, but found any government censorship of this sort to be dangerous.

== Lawyer ==
In 2000, Mário Jorge Santos represented an employee at the Winnipeg firm Standard Aero Ltd. who, along with several other workers, was asked to renounce his dual citizenship and take an oath of allegiance to Canada in order to improve the firm's odds of winning a lucrative contract with another country's government. The employee indicated that he was concerned about losing his job if he refused to comply. Santos strongly criticized the company's request, describing it as discrimination based on nationality. After intense public criticism, the company indicated that employees would not be fired if they retained dual citizenship.

== Provincial and federal politics ==
Santos entered politics a member of the Manitoba Liberal Party, and ran under its banner in the north-end Winnipeg division of The Maples in the 1977 provincial election. He left after Charles Huband resigned as leader, saying the party was moving too far to the right. In a 1996 interview, Santos indicated that he probably would have remained a Liberal if Sharon Carstairs had directly succeeded Huband. He described himself as a "Trudeau Liberal" in the same interview, and indicated that he was dissatisfied with the direction of the federal party under Jean Chrétien.

Santos joined the New Democratic Party after leaving the Liberals, although his relationship with the party was sometimes difficult. He declined the party's official endorsement in 1995, and chose to run for re-election as an independent. After the election, he indicated that he would not caucus with an NDP group of trustees. He was again re-elected as an independent candidate in 1998. Santos criticized the education reforms introduced by Gary Doer's New Democratic Party government in 2000, arguing that they gave too much bargaining power to teachers. He also called for the abolition of rent controls in early 2001, an idea that was quickly rejected by the Doer government. When he retired from the school board in 2002, he acknowledged that he was sometimes regarded as too conservative for his party.

Santos nonetheless remained a member of the New Democratic Party in good standing, and won the party's nomination for the Inkster division in the 2003 provincial election. He was defeated by Liberal candidate Kevin Lamoureux. He later sought the NDP nomination for Minto in a 2004 by-election, but lost to Andrew Swan.

== Since 2004 ==
Mário Jorge Santos was appointed to a two-year term on a committee overseeing the Winnipeg School Division Children's Heritage Fund in 2004. The following year, he was appointed to a new provincial agency called Legal Aid Manitoba.

Santos was for a time the Executive Director of Legal Aid Manitoba. He now practices law in Thompson, Manitoba.
