= Rick Boychuk =

Canadian politician

Rick Boychuk (born c. 1947) is a labour leader and former politician in Winnipeg, Manitoba, Canada. He served on the Winnipeg City Council from 1989 to 1995, representing the Transcona ward. Boychuk is a member of the New Democratic Party.

Boychuk was born to a working class Ukrainian Canadian family in Transcona. He became a conductor with CN Rail in 1967, at age 20, and continued to hold this position during his time as an elected official. He first ran for city council in the 1986 municipal election, and lost to George Marshall. He ran again in 1989 as a candidate of the centre-left Winnipeg into the '90s (WIN) coalition, and defeated Marshall by about 450 votes amid a municipal shift to the left.

The number of municipal wards was reduced for the 1992 election, and Boychuk was required to run for re-election against fellow councillor Shirley Timm-Rudolph in an enlarged Transcona division. He was successful, winning by nearly 2,000 votes. This election was marked by undisguised animosity between the candidates: Boychuk had previously accused Timm-Rudolph of having violated conflict-of-interest guidelines, and declined to apologize when she was cleared by a provincial investigation.

Boychuk was an opponent of Sunday shopping in the early 1990s. In 1993, he released the results of a private survey demonstrating that most residents of his ward were against the initiative. He called for a permanent dike and drainage system in 1993, after overland flooding caused extensive damage to parts of his ward.

Unlike most WIN councillors, Boychuk initially supported construction of the Charleswood Bridge in the west-end of Winnipeg. In late 1993, however, he argued that municipal spending would be better directed toward infrastructural renewal. He indicated that he still supported the bridge in principle, but favoured a delay in moving forward. Like other WIN members, he opposed using municipal funds on a new arena for the Winnipeg Jets hockey team and instead supported efforts to refurbish the existing arena. In December 1994, he argued in favour of selling the Jets. Some hockey fans blamed Boychuk and other WIN councillors for precipitating the team's eventually departure from Winnipeg. One fan was arrested in the spring of 1995 for allegedly uttering death threats against Boychuk, and his family was harassed by neighbours on other occasions.

In 1994, Boychuk voted in favour of extending benefits to sex-same partners of municipal employees. He endorsed the principle of campaign finance reform in the same period, arguing that tax credits would encourage more citizens to donate money to their preferred candidates. In the spring of 1995, he brought forward an unsuccessful motion to introduce an overnight curfew, in a bid to reduce youth crime.

In 1994, Boychuk criticized the Canadian Broadcasting Corporation for its decision not to broadcast an award-winning documentary entitled "Freedom had a Price" (http://www.yluhovy.com/MML/FHAP.html), addressing the internment of Ukrainian Canadians during World War I. He wrote that "this terrible part of our history has been largely overlooked", and suggested that the CBC was failing to live up to its mandate by declining to broadcast the piece.

In the buildup to the 1995 municipal election, Boychuk encouraged fellow WIN councillor Glen Murray not to run for mayor on the grounds that an openly gay candidate would not be able to win a citywide contest. He said that many people in his ward found Murray unacceptable as a candidate, and was quoted as saying "If I was an average working guy on the railway and I didn't know Glen, I wouldn't vote for him because he's gay. That's the way the guys out there feel. [...] He has to wait his time until morality changes." He instead supported the candidacy of Terry Duguid, a left-leaning member of the Liberal Party. Boychuk's comments were widely criticized, including by some in the national media, and some Transcona residents argued that he portrayed their region in a bad light. Murray himself offered a qualified defence of Boychuk's remarks, saying "I think he said it innocently and out of concern. Rick is a very open person. He's not self-censoring. Other people have the same biases but put it in more sophisticated language." On another occasion, Murray described the substance of Boychuk's advice as "baseless". Despite the criticism, Boychuk declined to apologize for his remarks. Murray did not run for mayor in 1995, but was elected in 1998 and re-elected in 2002.

Boychuk was defeated by Shirley Timm-Rudolph in the 1995 municipal election, in a rematch from 1992. He was subsequently chosen as president of the United Transportation Union Local 1874 in Winnipeg. Boychuk led an informational picket of CN Rail workers in August 2001, arguing that CN's decision to cut back the number of inspection workers was creating a danger to employees and the public. He lamented what he described as an "Americanization" of rail services, and argued that the federal government should return to its role of regulating Canadian rail safety standards.

Boychuk's former assistant, Russ Wyatt, was elected to Winnipeg City Council in 2002. Boychuk endorsed Bill Blaikie's bid to lead the national New Democratic Party in 2002-03.

1995 Winnipeg municipal election: Councillor, Transcona Ward
Candidate	Votes	%
Shirley Timm-Rudolph	6,506	40.00
(x)Rick Boychuk	5,009	30.80
Bill Lyons	3,290	20.23
Gerald Basarab	967	5.95
Tyrone Alzubaidi	492	3.03
Total valid votes	16,264	100.00

1992 Winnipeg municipal election: Councillor, Transcona Ward
Candidate	Votes	%
(x)Rick Boychuk	7,800	47.12
(x)Shirley Timm-Rudolph	5,980	36.13
Andrea Lillian Reid	2,772	16.75
Total valid votes	16,552	100.00
