= Amaro Silva =

Canadian politician

Amaro Silva (September 9, 1957 – March 27, 2015) was a municipal politician in Winnipeg, Manitoba, Canada. He served on the Winnipeg City Council from 1992 to 1998.

Silva was a computer operator, architectural draftsman and consultant. He was a member of the Liberal Party, and was listed as thirty-eight years old in a 1995 newspaper article.

== First term ==
Silva was first elected to the Winnipeg City Council in the 1992 municipal election, defeating incumbent councillor Donovan Timmers in the inner-city Daniel McIntyre ward. He was considered to be a "swing vote" on council during his first term. He described himself as a progressive, although he supported the council's conservative faction on key matters in return for their support on issues of concern to his ward. He was appointed as chair of the civic protection, parks and culture committee in October 1993.

Late in 1993, Silva provided crucial support on council for the construction of a bridge in Charleswood. He supported an early to community policing in the same period, and expressed concerns about the use of pepper spray by city police. He later called for a comprehensive review of the city's police force, after four officers were charged with corruption. Silva also suggested that Winnipeg consider "tasteful" advertising on police cruisers and ambulances as a means of generating revenue.

As the representative of an inner-city ward, Silva was frequently involved in debates about urban renewal. He opposed a private-sector core renewal project in 1995, arguing that it would provide financial benefits to the city and province but would do nothing to help the area targeted for improvement. Silva initially opposed public financing for a new area that was proposed by the Manitoba Entertainment Complex in 1994, as a means of keeping the Winnipeg Jets hockey franchise in the city. He later changed his position, and indicated that he would support a plan to fund the arena. The plan was ultimately unsuccessful, and the Jets left the city.

Silva supported the extension of same-sex benefits to municipal workers in 1994.

He was asked to run for the Manitoba Liberal Party in the 1995 provincial election, but declined.

== Second term ==
Silva was re-elected over former New Democratic Party Member of Parliament Cyril Keeper in the 1995 municipal election. His primary concern in this campaign was public safety, while Keeper criticized Silva for having supported the bridge and arena proposals. Silva was appointed chair of the planning and community services community after the election, and also served on the civic executive policy committee. He generally voted with Mayor Susan Thompson and the right wing of council.

In late 1995, Silva called for the federal government to reconsider its planned cuts to social assistance recipients. He later supported a law giving the city power to shut down massage parlours and other businesses that violate zoning bylaws, and unsuccessfully called for a youth curfew to reduce crime rates.

In 1996, Silva was one of Winnipeg's two negotiators in discussions with promoter Wayne Flett to set up "Music City Manitoba", a tourist destination planned for the downtown core. A tentative deal was announced in November 1996, although discussions later dissolved amid acrimony. The city wanted Flett to provide his financial records, while Flett argued that the city was assuming bad faith.

Silva was promoted to chair of the city's finance committee in March 1997. One day after his appointment, he oversaw the approval of a plan to give property tax rebates to new home owners. Later in the year, he introduced a plan that would have restricted discussions between city employees and the media. This plan was widely criticized.

Silva introduced a motion in October 1997 to radically reform the structure of city hall, including the hiring of a chief administrative officer and the dismissal of the four-member Board of Commissioners. The plan was strongly supported by Mayor Susan Thompson, and was passed without difficulty. The following month, Silva was reassigned as chair of the protection and community services, and was also appointed to a new expenditure management committee.

Winnipeg's community services committee granted a licence to an escort service in April 1998, even though councillors suspected (but could not prove) that it was a front for prostitution. Silva subsequently called for Winnipeg to be given the legislative powers to shut down escort services, massage parlours, pawn shops and related services.

Throughout his time on council, Silva complained that insurance firms were discriminating against residents of his ward.

Silva originally announced that he would run for mayor in the 1998 municipal election, but he withdrew months before election day. He instead sought re-election to council, and was defeated by Harvey Smith.

== 1999 to death ==
Silva was CEO of the Better Business Bureau of Manitoba from 1999 to 2014. A newspaper report from 2001 indicates that he was planning to co-manage Brian Tobin's Manitoba campaign in his bid to become leader of the Liberal Party of Canada. Tobin eventually decided not to run. He died on March 27, 2015, following a "serious illness".
