= New Democratic Party of Manitoba candidates in the 1999 Manitoba provincial election =

The New Democratic Party of Manitoba fielded a full slate of candidates in the 1999 provincial election, and won 32 seats out of 57 to win a majority government in the legislature. Many of the party's candidates have their own biography pages; information about others may be found here.

This page also includes information about New Democratic Party candidates who contested by-election between 1999 and 2003.

== Connie Gretsinger (Portage la Prairie) ==
Gretsinger is a registered nurse in Portage la Prairie (Winnipeg Free Press, 12 July 1997). She campaigned for the federal New Democratic Party in the 1993 federal election and received 3,029 votes (8.49%) in the riding of Portage—Interlake, finishing fourth against Liberal candidate Jon Gerrard.

She later campaigned for the provincial constituency of Portage la Prairie in the 1995 provincial election, and finished third against Brian Pallister of the Progressive Conservative Party with 1,519 votes (19.62%). Pallister retired two years later to campaign for the House of Commons of Canada, and Gretsinger entered the by-election to succeed him. She received 1,340 votes, finishing third against Progressive Conservative David Faurschou. A newspaper report lists her as having been 47 years old at the time (Winnipeg Free Press, 1 October 1997). She improved her standing to 2,769 votes in 1999, finishing a much stronger second against Faurschou.

As of 2005, Gretsinger is a member of the Regional Health Authority for Central Manitoba Inc. She was appointed to represent this group at the National Healthcare Leadership Conference in June 2005.

== Peter Reimer (River Heights) ==
Reimer received 1,492 votes (12.98%), finishing third against Manitoba Liberal Party leader Jon Gerrard.

== Leslie Fingler (Seine River) ==
Fingler has worked as a florist, crisis counsellor and mental health-care worker. She has campaigned in two provincial elections and three municipal elections. When running for the St. Vital school board, she expressed concern that parents could turn to private schools in the future. She spoke against the planned OlyWest hog plant in the 2006 campaign.

In a 1998 letter, she upheld the social aims of Cooperative Commonwealth Federation leaders Tommy Douglas and James Shaver Woodsworth.

Electoral record
Election	Division	Party	Votes	%	Place	Winner
1995 provincial	Niakwa	New Democratic Party	1,961		3/3	Jack Reimer, Progressive Conservative
1995 municipal	St. Vital School Division	n/a	3,244		16/24	Seven candidates elected
1999 provincial	Seine River	New Democratic Party	3,464		2/4	Louise Dacquay, Progressive Conservative
2002 municipal	Louis Riel School Division, Ward Two	n/a	2,493		3/7	Marilyn Seguire and Mike Ducharme
2006 municipal	Winnipeg City Council, St. Vital Ward	n/a	2,466	17.27	2/3	Gord Steeves

== Iris Taylor (Southdale) ==
Taylor is a graduate of the Labour College of Canada at the University of Ottawa, and has completed a three-year labour certificate program from the University of Manitoba (Winnipeg Free Press, 23 May 1997). She is a labour activist in Winnipeg. As of 2005, she serves on the Winnipeg Labour Council as the Manitoba representative of the Canadian Labour Congress. Taylor is a past member and president of CEP Local 7, and once worked for the Manitoba Telephone Service.

She supported Alexa McDonough's campaign to lead the federal New Democratic Party in 1995 (Winnipeg Free Press, 23 May 1997), and endorsed Bill Blaikie in 2002-03. In 2003, she was a vocal opponent of the United States invasion of Iraq (Winnipeg Free Press, 9 March 2003).

She campaigned for the federal NDP in the 1997 election, and received 4,629 votes (12.21%) for a fourth-place finish against Liberal Reg Alcock. In 1999, she received 2,909 votes to finish second against Progressive Conservative Jack Reimer.

== Janet Brady (Turtle Mountain) ==
Brady was born and raised in Montreal, Quebec, and has a Master of Social Work degree from Carleton University. She is a social worker by profession, and has worked in Quebec, Manitoba, Saskatchewan and Alberta. She was the spokeswoman for the Westman Community Action Coalition in 1998, and in this capacity scrutinized plans for a wastewater treatment plant in the Brandon area. She also criticized the provincial government of Gary Filmon for approving a local hog farm without conducting a Clean Environment Commission review.

She originally sought the NDP nomination for Arthur-Virden for the 1999 election, but lost to Perry Kalynuk. She later campaigned in Turtle Mountain and received 1,902 votes, finishing second against Progressive Conservative incumbent Merv Tweed.

Brady worked in Thompson from 1987 to 1990 as a social worker with Awasis, and returned to the community in 2002 to teach at the city's Faculty of Social Work, affiliated with the University of Manitoba. She serves on the Burntwood Regional Health Authority.

== Jack Dubois (Tuxedo) ==
Dubois worked as curator of mammology at Winnipeg's Museum of Man and Nature 1971 - 2001, and has done extensive research into Manitoba's bat population. He was chair of the board of the Manitoba Environmental Network for 10 years, and was appointed to the Manitoba Round Table on Environmental and the Economy in 1988. Dubois was later appointed to the Manitoba Round Table for Sustainable Development in 1998, and reappointed in 2000. He is Director of the Wildlife and Ecosystem Prevention Branch of Manitoba Conservation, starting January 2002, and continues to hold this position as of 2010.

He received 2,333 votes (23.80%) in 1999, finishing second against Progressive Conservative Premier Gary Filmon.

== Dawn Thompson (Kirkfield Park by-election, November 21, 2000) ==
Thompson was a registered nurse in Winnipeg at the time of the election. She served on the Workland Staffing Reports Committee of the Manitoba Nurses Union in 1999, representing community care.

She received 1,512 votes (18.67%), finishing third against Progressive Conservative leader Stuart Murray.
