= Evelyne Reese =

Canadian politician

Eveline Marie Reese (née Bisson; July 4, 1932 – January 29, 2024) was a Canadian politician from Winnipeg, Manitoba. She served on the Winnipeg City Council for fifteen years, and ran for the Legislative Assembly of Manitoba on two occasions as a candidate of the Liberal Party.

Reese was first elected to the Winnipeg City Council in the 1974 municipal election, defeating incumbent councillor Michael Dennehy in the St. Boniface ward of Winakwa. She was endorsed by a centre-left group called the Civic Reform Coalition, while Dennehy was part of the governing centre-right Independent Citizens' Election Committee. Reese later ran in the 1977 provincial election, and finished third against Progressive Conservative Abe Kovnats in Radisson. She was not a candidate in the 1977 municipal election, but returned to council in 1980 with a victory over incumbent councillor George Provost in the redistributed Langevin ward. She was re-elected in 1983.

Reese narrowly lost to right-wing candidate Louise Dacquay in 1986, but was returned over Dacquay in 1989 as a candidate of the newly formed centre-left Winnipeg into the '90s coalition. In 1991, Reese led an effort to have Petro Canada remove gasoline-contaminated soil from a site in her ward. She also criticized a report by retired judge Ted Hughes into the mismanaged prosecution of a Winnipeg attorney for what turned out to be an unfounded accusation of sexual assault. Reese argued that Hughes singled out the police for criticism, and did not adequately address problems in the provincial justice department.

Reese was re-elected for the redistributed St. Boniface ward in 1992 as a candidate of the renamed Winnipeg in the '90s group. She was appointed as deputy speaker of Winnipeg City Council in November 1993, and later served as acting chair of the city's riverbank management committee.

She opposed unrestricted Sunday shopping for Winnipeg, and strongly criticized a plan to cut a traditional Christmas bonus for welfare recipients in late 1993. She also opposed councillor Al Golden's plan to create an eight-lane bridge linking St. Boniface and St. Vital with downtown Winnipeg, arguing that it would create traffic problems for her ward. Reese made several attempts to have an abandoned Canada Packers plant in her ward demolished, without success. In 1995, she called for suburban zoning to be expanded to allow for rooming houses in single-family areas.

Reese supported various plans to expand recreational space at Whittier Park in her ward. She opposed Al Golden's 1993 proposal to remove a baseball diamond from an historical site on the park grounds, arguing that the field was needed for children's recreation. She was later skeptical of a proposal to turn Louis Riel's birthplace near the park into an historical landmark, on the grounds that it could prevent the construction of a soccer field in the area. In late 1994, she supported a plan to have Whittier Park designated as the site for Sam Katz's Winnipeg Goldeyes baseball team. She was opposed in this initiative by Dan Vandal of the Old St. Boniface Residents Association, who argued that the plan would create several traffic problems for the area.

Reese opposed spending public money on a new arena for the Winnipeg Jets hockey team during most of her time on council. She shifted to a pro-arena position for an important May 1995 vote, but later returned to the opposition camp when various complications emerged. The Jets eventually left the city when an agreement for the arena could not be reached. Jim Silver later published a book entitled Thin Ice: Money, Politics and the Demise of an NHL Franchise, in which he argued that Reese and other councillors only supported the arena plan due to "unbearable arm-twisting" from its supporters.

She opposed the extension of employee benefits to the same-sex partners of civic employees in 1994, arguing that the city was not under a legal obligation to extend the benefits as same-sex partnerships were not "spousal relationships".

Reese was nominated as the Liberal Party candidate for Niakwa in May 1994, in anticipation of the 1995 provincial election. She remained a member of city council during the campaign. Although considered a strong candidate, she was hurt by her party's weak provincial campaign and finished second against Progressive Conservative incumbent Jack Reimer.

Reese left Winnipeg in the '90s (WIN) in 1994, citing policy differences. She was defeated by WIN-endorsed candidate Dan Vandal in the 1995 municipal election. Reese's handling of the arena issue was cited as a factor in her defeat. She initially said that she planned to run again in 1998, but ultimately did not do so. She has not returned to public life since this time.
