= Progressive Conservative Party of Manitoba candidates in the 1999 Manitoba provincial election =

The Progressive Conservative Party of Manitoba fielded a full slate of candidates in the 1999 provincial election, and won 24 out of 57 seats to become the Official Opposition after eleven years in government.

Many of the party's candidates have their own biography pages; information about others may be found here.

== Brandon East: Marty Snelling ==
Snelling has a Master of Education degree in Physical Education. He was fitness director of the central YMCA in Toronto during the 1970s, and was later director of YMCA Camp Pine Crest on the banks of Clear Lake in Ontario. He later moved to Brandon, Manitoba, where he led the local YMCA.

Snelling has been a Brandon school trustee since 1995. He was 53 years old during the 1999 election, and campaigned wearing a YMCA-themed "Run with Marty" t-shirt. He highlighted the Progressive Conservative government's success in bringing a hog farm to the city.

Snelling was chairman of the Brandon School Zone Committee in the early 2000s, and worked to ensure that persons under eighteen would not be permitted to buy cigarettes at local outlets. The Committee's connection to the Canadian Tobacco Manufacturers Council was strongly criticized by provincial anti-smoking advocates, who argued that the service was simply a public relations exercise for the tobacco industry.

Snelling's wife, Barbara Bragg, has also campaigned for municipal office.

Electoral record
Election	Division	Party	Votes	%	Place	Winner
1995 municipal	Brandon School Trustee, Ward One	n/a	not listed	not listed	not listed	himself and seven other candidates
1998 municipal	Brandon School Trustee, Ward One	n/a	5,402		1/13	himself and seven other candidates
1999 provincial	Brandon East	Progressive Conservative	2,080	26.34	2/4	Drew Caldwell, New Democratic Party
2002 municipal	Brandon School Trustee, Ward One	n/a				himself and seven other candidates
2006 municipal	Brandon School Trustee, Ward One	n/a	4,985	7.15	3/20	himself and seven other candidates

== Burrows: Cheryl Clark ==
Clark received 724 votes (9.32%) in 1999, finishing third against New Democratic Party candidate Doug Martindale.

Former Manitoba Progressive Conservative Member of Parliament (MP) Lee Clark has a daughter named Cheryl, although it is not known if this is the same person as the 1999 candidate (Ottawa Citizen, 13 May 1993).

== Concordia: Paul Murphy ==
Murphy was born in Winnipeg in March 1962 as a thalidomide baby, with shortened arms and legs. He worked as an agent for Perka International before his bid for office, and owned companies manufacturing accessible taxis for disabled persons. He joined Motor Coach Industries Ltd. in 1996, and subsequently became a director of regulatory compliance. He also became president of the Thalidomide Victims Association of Canada, and played a major role in winning financial concessions from the government. He is a wheelchair user, and was described by the Winnipeg Free Press as "the first physically challenged candidate to ever run for the legislature" during his first campaign in 1995. He was later featured in the film Extraordinary People.

Electoral record
Election	Division	Party	Votes	%	Place	Winner
1995 provincial	Concordia	Progressive Conservative	1,845	24.30	2/4	Gary Doer, New Democratic Party
1999 provincial	Concordia	Progressive Conservative	1,898	23.37	2/4	Gary Doer, New Democratic Party

== Elmwood: Elsie Bordynuik ==
Bordynuik is a visual artist, and has created various works of wildlife art. She received 2,659 votes (32.29%), finishing second against New Democratic Party incumbent Jim Maloway.

== Inkster: George (Gurjant) Sandhu ==
George (Gurjant) Sandhu received 1,017 votes (12.91%), finishing third against New Democratic Party candidate Becky Barrett. He later pleaded guilty to spending $2,139 more than the allowable limit of $25,000 on his campaign, and was given a small fine. He said that the error was not intentional, but was rather the result of "essentially running a one-man campaign".

== Radisson: Henry A. McDonald ==
McDonald works in sales and marketing. He first sought election to Winnipeg City Council in the 1995 municipal election, calling for workfare and the contracting out of city services. He also indicated that he would work with educators, social workers, police and youth to find solutions to crime. He was 53 years old, and was not a member of any political party at the time. He finished third against incumbent councillor Lillian Thomas.

McDonald sought election to the Winnipeg School Board in 1998, and was again defeated. He lost to New Democratic Party incumbent Marianne Cerilli in 1999.

Electoral record
Election	Division	Party	Votes	%	Place	Winner
1995 municipal	Winnipeg City Council, Elmwood Ward	n/a	1,742	16.43	3/6	Lillian Thomas
1998 municipal	Winnipeg School Board, Ward Three	n/a	2,602		9/11	Mike Babinsky, Roman Yereniuk, Liz Ambrose
1999 provincial	Radisson	Progressive Conservative	3,114		2/3	Marianne Cerilli, New Democratic Party

== Transcona: Dan Turner ==
Turner received 2,409 votes (27.38%), finishing second against New Democratic Party incumbent Daryl Reid.
