= Peter Kaufmann (politician) =

Canadian politician

Peter Kaufmann is a Canadian businessman and former municipal politician in Winnipeg, Manitoba, Canada. He has been a city councillor and school trustee, and has campaigned for Mayor of Winnipeg on two occasions.

== Early life and career ==
Kaufmann was born in 1947 on the Danish island of Fejø. His father Ivan left Denmark for Sweden before World War II, because his last name was Jewish, and he feared persecution from the Nazis. His father later returned and fought against the Nazis with the Danish resistance movement. Kaufmann moved to rural Manitoba with his family in 1954, and later settled in Winnipeg. He is the founder of the local grocery franchise Kaufmann Foods, the first branch of which was set up in 1979 in St. Vital. In 1993, Kaufmann said that his intent was to provide service for areas neglected by major supermarket chains.

== Trustee and councillor ==
Kaufmann was elected to the St. Vital school board in 1983, and served for three years before his defeat in 1986. His support for a sex-education program that was opposed by some local groups probably contributed to his loss. He was later elected to city council in the 1989 municipal election for Seine Valley. He supported efforts to keep the Winnipeg Jets hockey franchise in the city. In 1991, he brought forward a motion requiring cyclists in Winnipeg to wear helmets. His ward was eliminated for the 1992 municipal election, and he did not seek election elsewhere.

In early 1995, Kaufmann represented a group of local businessmen in their effort to build a new arena next to the Winnipeg Convention Centre, with the intent of keeping the Jets in the city. This was a rival proposal to that offered by the Manitoba Entertainment Complex (MEC). The plan was unsuccessful.

== 1995 mayoral campaign ==
Kaufmann first campaigned for Mayor of Winnipeg in the 1995 municipal election. He pledged to eliminate the business tax over ten years, shift school taxes from property to income, cut city staff and budgets, and restructure city council to dissolve the board of commissioners. He supported an apprentice program for at-risk youth and opposed the sale of Winnipeg Hydro to the private sector, although he favoured contracting out various municipal services. Kaufmann said that he would spend up to $10 million to refurbish Winnipeg's existing arena, but would not support construction of a new arena in the near future.

He also said that he would move to shut down the Winnipeg's food banks, describing them as an unfair drain on local groceries and suggesting that his pro-business platform would eliminate the need for such outlets. He later qualified this statement by indicating that he not shut down food banks immediately, and acknowledging that many Winnipeg residents depended on them.

Kaufmann described himself as an "outsider" candidate against both incumbent Susan Thompson and challenger Terry Duguid, whom he identified as the candidates of "big business" and "big unions" respectively. Kaufmann said that he was a candidate of "the people", and likened his candidacy to those of Ross Perot, Ralph Klein and Mike Harris. Some in the local media criticized his platform as simplistic, and as privileging business interests over social concerns. Generally portrayed as a right-wing candidate, Kaufmann nonetheless expressed support for some left-wing positions such as a guaranteed income. His supporters included Al Golden and John Prystanski.

Initially considered the third-ranked candidate, Kaufmann gained momentum in the campaign's final weeks and finished a surprisingly strong second behind Thompson. He remained active in municipal affairs after the election, and spoke against tax increases introduced by the Thompson administration. There was very little surprise when he decided to campaign for mayor a second time again in the 1998 municipal election.

== 1998 mayoral campaign ==
Kaufmann highlighted many of the same themes as in 1995, and was primarily focused on tax reduction. The dynamic of the contest, however, was quite different. Susan Thompson did not run for re-election, and Kaufmann's primary opponent was Glen Murray, a popular centre-left councillor who soon emerged as the frontrunning candidate. Kaufmann again highlighted his "outsider" status, and worked as his own campaign manager. Both candidates promised tax cuts and government efficiency, leading some in the media to conclude that there was little practical difference between their campaigns.

Kaufmann promised to reduce property taxes by 21.4% over five years, cut up to 2,500 city jobs, and impose user fees for some services. Unlike in the 1995 campaign, he promised to sell Winnipeg Hydro and put the revenues toward debt reduction and lower taxes. Murray argued the sale would pose long-term dangers for the city. Kaufmann, in return, argued that Murray was insincere in his pledge to reduce taxes.

Despite an endorsement from the Winnipeg Free Press newspaper, Kaufmann narrowly lost to Murray on election day. He later acknowledged that his proposal to cut municipal jobs was a mistake.

== After 1998 ==
Kaufmann turned over the day-to-day operations of Kaufmann Foods to his brother after the election, and began working for Flanders Real Estate Ltd. He later joined CB Richard Ellis Chartier & Associates. He was barred from running in the 2002 municipal election after he failed to submit an audited list of election expenses (he indicated that he had no intention of running anyway). He wrote a guest editorial for the Winnipeg Free Press in 2006, arguing that high school taxes have been responsible for Winnipeg's urban decline.

Kaufmann has recently supported left-leaning candidates for mayor. During the 2002 contest, he said that Glen Murray had done a good job and deserved to be re-elected. He later supported MaryAnn Mihychuk in a 2004 by-election, after Murray resigned to run for the House of Commons of Canada.

Kaufmann supports the Progressive Conservative Party of Manitoba, and was a supporter of the Progressive Conservative Party of Canada until he joined the Canadian Alliance in 2000. Somewhat improbably, he has listed Margaret Thatcher and Stanley Knowles as his political heroes.
