= Theresa Ducharme =

Canadian activist (1945–2004)

Theresa Ducharme (1945 – June 7, 2004) was a Canadian disability rights activist and a perennial candidate for public office. She lived in Winnipeg, Manitoba, Canada.

== Activist ==
After contracting polio in 1953, Ducharme was reliant on a wheelchair. She subsequently went into a coma for six months during her mid-twenties, and for the rest of her life required a respirator. She founded the disability rights advocacy group People in Equal Participation Inc. in 1981, and was the organization's chair for many years thereafter.

In 1981, she became the first person requiring an on-board life-support system to fly as a regular passenger on a commercial Canadian airliner. Her flight to Vancouver was the culmination of a lengthy battle with officials from the government and Air Canada, who had resisted her attempts to fly because of medical concerns.

Ducharme was a vocal opponent of euthanasia. In 1993, she asked the Supreme Court of Canada to rule against Sue Rodriguez, a British Columbia woman who had a terminal illness and was seeking the right to take her life. Ducharme was quoted as saying, "We believe in the commandment, thou shall not kill. We have enough obstacles that access to life, not access to death is our commitment." She later called for criminal charges to be laid against Member of Parliament Svend Robinson, following Robinson's decision to sit beside Rodriguez as she apparently committed suicide with her doctor's assistance.

Ducharme organized a national anti-euthanasia petition in 1994, and received more than 27,000 signatures. She personally presented the petition to Member of Parliament Don Boudria, who later tabled it before parliament.

In 1995, Ducharme sought legal standing for her organization to testify at Robert Latimer's appeal of a conviction for second-degree murder. Latimer had killed his daughter, a twelve-year-old girl with cerebral palsy, in an act that many had described as a mercy killing. Ducharme argued that Latimer's conviction should be upheld, and indicated her support for a ruling which gave him a life sentence. She sought legal standing again when Latimer was granted a new trial in 1996, and accused the media of having a pro-Latimer bias.

Ducharme also campaigned to have several public services made wheelchair-accessible in her home city of Winnipeg. She led a public protest again the provincial government's decision to privatize home care services in 1996, and later testified before the Romanow commission on health. In 2003, she supported city council's decision to legislate a smoking ban in Winnipeg.

Ducharme was a Ukrainian Catholic, and was opposed to abortion as well as euthanasia. In 1995, she was given an Apostolic Blessing from Pope John Paul II.

She was given the Province of Manitoba's first annual Special Caring Award in 1998.

Ducharme wrote a self-published autobiography, entitled Life and Breath. Federal cabinet minister Lloyd Axworthy wrote a preface to the book.

== Political candidate ==
Ducharme ran for the Transcona-Springfield school board in 1980 and 1992, and for the Transcona ward on Winnipeg City Council in 1983 and 1986. She was considered a fringe candidate, and was defeated each time.

Ducharme supported Susan Thompson's bid to become Mayor of Winnipeg in 1992, but was later strongly critical of Thompson's record in office. She was Thompson's first declared challenger in the 1995 municipal election. Ducharme said that her top priority was creating a youth advisory committee of city council, and she also criticized Thompson for not having done more to promote downtown business. She was again considered a fringe candidate, and finished well behind the frontrunners.

She campaigned for the Transcona ward again in 1998, finishing second to Shirley Timm-Rudolph. During the election, she spoke against youth curfews and the sale of Winnipeg Hydro.

Ducharme also sought election to the House of Commons of Canada as an independent candidate in 1997 and 2000. She planned to run for mayor again in 2002, but withdrew due to health problems. She had intended to run in another municipal by-election shortly before her death.

== Death ==
Ducharme had a heart attack in June 2004, as she was being driven to hospital for dialysis treatment. She never regained consciousness, and died on June 7.

== Electoral record ==
2000 Canadian federal election: Winnipeg—Transcona
Party	Candidate	Votes	%	±%	Expenditures
New Democratic	Bill Blaikie	15,680	47.85	−2.42	$35,468.07
Alliance	Shawn Rattai	8,336	25.44	+8.21	$21,800.25
Liberal	Bret Dobbin	6,041	18.43	−3.03	$17,596.32
Progressive Conservative	Chris Brewer	2,133	6.51	−2.46	–
Green	C. David Nickarz	229	0.70	–	–
Christian Heritage	Robert Scott	146	0.45	−0.83	$3,639.93
Independent	Theresa Ducharme	118	0.36	−0.13	–
Communist	James Hogaboam	87	0.27		$263.77
Total valid votes		32,770	99.61		
Total rejected ballots		127	0.39	−0.21	
Turnout		32,897	58.38	−1.97	
Electors on the lists		56,345			
New Democratic hold		Swing		−5.31	
Sources: Official Results, Elections Canada and Financial Returns, Elections Canada.

1998 Winnipeg municipal election: Councillor, Transcona Ward
Candidate	Votes	%
(x)Shirley Timm-Rudolph	12,223	82.49
Theresa Ducharme	2,594	17.51
Total valid votes	14,817	100.00

1997 Canadian federal election: Winnipeg—Transcona
Party	Candidate	Votes	%	±%	Expenditures
New Democratic	Bill Blaikie	16,640	50.27	+11.01	$37,996
Liberal	Rosemary Broadbent	7,105	21.46	−16.90	$25,771
Reform	Helen Sterzer	5,703	17.23	+3.42	$19,506
Progressive Conservative	Glenn Buffie	2,968	8.97	+4.01	$7,682
Christian Heritage	Robert Scott	423	1.28		$3,633
Independent	Theresa Ducharme	161	0.49		$111
Marxist–Leninist	Ken Kalturnyk	104	0.31		$11
Total valid votes		33,104	99.40		
Total rejected ballots		199	0.60		
Turnout		33,303	60.36		
Electors on the lists		55,177			
New Democratic hold		Swing		+13.95	
Percentage change figures are factored for redistribution.
Sources: Official Results, Elections Canada and Financial Returns, Elections Canada.
