= 2006 Winnipeg municipal election =

The 2006 Winnipeg municipal election was held on October 25, 2006, to elect a mayor, councillors and school trustees in the city of Winnipeg, Manitoba, Canada.

Sam Katz was re-elected Mayor of Winnipeg over left-leaning challenger Marianne Cerilli.

== Results ==
=== Mayor ===
2006 Winnipeg municipal election: Mayor of Winnipeg
Candidate	Votes	%
(x)Sam Katz	104,380	61.60
Marianne Cerilli	38,227	22.56
Kaj Hasselriis	22,401	13.22
Ron Pollock	4,444	2.62
Total valid votes	169,452	100.00

=== Council ===
2006 Winnipeg municipal election: Elmwood-East Kildonan
Candidate	Votes	%
(x)Lillian Thomas	4,945	57.65
David J. Danyluk	1,657	19.32
Wally Roth	1,585	18.48
Isaiah Oyeleru	390	4.55
Total valid votes	8,577	100.00

- Wally Roth was 61 years old at the time of the election, and owned an auto repair centre. During the 1980s, he was the owner of a used car business called Economy Auto Sales of Winnipeg and a resident advisor to city hall. A member of the Progressive Conservative Party of Manitoba, Roth has described his political views as "straight down the middle". He endorsed Mayor Sam Katz's bid for re-election in the 2006 campaign.

2006 Winnipeg municipal election: City Councillor, St. Boniface Ward
Candidate	Votes	%
Dan Vandal	9,785	56.70
(x)Franco Magnifico	6,989	40.49
Murray Cliff	485	2.81
Total valid votes	17,259	100.00

2006 Winnipeg municipal election: City Councillor, St. Charles Ward
Candidate	Votes	%
(x)Grant Nordman	3,415	33.55
Kelly de Groot	2,727	26.79
Shawn Dobson	2,516	24.72
Rene Lewis	1,520	14.93
Total valid votes	10,178	100.00

2006 Winnipeg municipal election: City Councillor, St. Vital Ward
Candidate	Votes	%
(x)Gord Steeves	10,762	75.38
Leslie Fingler	2,466	17.27
Markus Buchart	1,049	7.35
Total valid votes	14,277	100.00

2006 Winnipeg municipal election: City Councillor, Transcona Ward
Candidate	Votes	%
(x)Russ Wyatt	7,880	85.23
Gerald Basarab	785	8.49
Stephen Smith	581	6.28
Total valid votes	9,246	100.00

=== School Trustees ===
==== St. James-Assiniboia School Division ====
2006 Winnipeg election, Trustee, River East Transcona School Division, Ward One (two members elected)
Candidate	Total votes	% of total votes
(incumbent)Linda Archer	4,240	24.30
Cheryl Smukowich	3,462	19.84
(incumbent)Bruce Chegus	3,331	19.09
Grant Crosbie	3,263	18.70
Denyse Lambert	2,017	11.56
Kent Whiteside	1,134	6.50
Total valid votes	17,447	100.00

- Linda Archer was first elected to the St. James-Assiniboia School Board in a 1994 by-election, following the death of Maureen Jack. She said that she was not political or issue-driven, and indicated that she wanted to maintain high-quality education. She was re-elected in the general elections of 1995, 1998, 2002 and 2006. She became president of the Manitoba Association of School Trustees for a one-year term in 2002, and in this capacity criticized the provincial government's plans for school board amalgamation. She also argued that class sizes should be overseen by school boards, rather than by the province. At the end of her term in 2003, she delivered a speech arguing that Manitoba school boards were under attack from the provincial government. She also helped spearhead a change to MAST's constitution, allowing presidents to serve for two-year terms.
- Bruce Chegus was first elected to the St. James-Assiniboia School Board in 1989, and was re-elected in 1992, 1995, 1998, 2002 and 2006. He served as chair of the St. James-Assiniboia board after the 1995 election, and spearheaded an initiative to release reports on student academic performance and student perceptions of education to the general public.

==== River East Transcona School Division ====
2006 Winnipeg election, Trustee, River East Transcona School Division, Ward One (two members elected)
Candidate	Total votes	% of total votes
(incumbent)Colleen Carswell	4,336	38.35
George Marshall	3,838	33.95
Wayne Laniuk	3,132	27.70
Total valid votes	11,306	100.00

- Colleen Carswell was first elected to the Transcona-Springfield School Division in 1992, and was re-elected in 1995 and 1998. She served as its chair from 1998 to 2000, and led the board in its controversial decision to impose rent charges on before- and after-school day care. She also supported the contracting out of bus and mechanical services. She was elected to the amalgamated River East Transcona board in 2002, and voted against a high-profile proposal to rename Wayoata School after Terry Fox in 2005. Carswell was chosen as vice-chair of the River East Transcona Division after her re-election in November 2006.

== Post-election changes ==
John Orlikow resigned his seat on the Winnipeg School Board to run for a vacant seat on the Winnipeg City Council.

March 17, 2009 by-election, Winnipeg School Division, Ward One
Candidate	Total votes	% of total votes
Rita Hildahl	2,427	37.92
Gary Brownstone	1,362	21.28
Colin Fast	1,047	16.36
Barbara Coombs	975	15.23
Shane Nestruck	345	5.39
Carlos James	245	3.83
Total valid votes	6,401	100.00

- Shane Nestruck (born September 4, 1947) is a musician and activist. He holds L.Mus. and Bachelor of Education degrees, and has played with the Montreal Sax Quartet, the Winnipeg Sax Quartet and the Winnipeg Symphony Orchestra. A saxophonist and occasional clarinetist, he is a private tutor and operated an instrument repair shop during the 1970s. After starting his professional career in Montreal, he moved to Winnipeg in 1978. He is a Canadian federalist and a supporter of the Canadian Broadcasting Corporation (CBC), and has written against Quebec separatism. He provided a room for Sasha Boychok in 1991, when the saxophone player was attempting to defect from the Soviet Union. Nestruck and Boychouk later played together in the group Saxology Canada, which released a CD called Points in Time (1997), and were among the founding members of the Winnipeg Jazz Orchestra. Nestruck ran for a position on the board of the Winnipeg Musicians' Association in 2004, but was not elected. He opposed the 2003 invasion of Iraq. In 2005, he reviewed Maude Barlow's book Too Close for Comfort: Canada's Future Within Fortress North America for the Winnipeg Free Press newspaper. Nestruck is a supporter of light rail transit for Winnipeg, and initially supported Mayor Sam Katz for his policy views on the matter. By 2006, however, he was calling on Katz to resign for poor judgement on several matters. Nestruck was a supporter of the New Democratic Party for most of his life, but became disillusioned with the Manitoba NDP in the 1990s and 2000s. He ran for the party's nomination in Fort Rouge as an "outsider" candidate in the buildup to the 2007 provincial election, accusing the party of betraying its social democratic ideals and of emulating the practices of federal Liberal governments. He also accused Premier Gary Doer of being a "pretender" who had "hijacked the party". He finished third against Jennifer Howard. Nestruck later ran for the leadership of the Green Party of Manitoba in 2008, and lost to James Beddome. He is an active supporter of electoral reform, and has argued that Canada's traditional parties have become stuck in following outmoded models of economic growth and oil dependency. Notwithstanding his progressive views on most issues, Nestruck has also supported several "law and order" initiatives, including a plan for the Winnipeg police to post the names of persons charged with drunk driving offenses online. The 2009 by-election campaign was his first bid for public office; he said that he would cut his stipend, and seek to restore discipline on schoolgrounds. For Earth Day 2009, CBC Manitoba named Nestruck as the "Greenest Manitoban".
