= Secter =

Secter is a surname. Notable people with the surname include:

- David Secter (born 1943), Canadian film director
- Harvey Secter, chancellor of the University of Manitoba

== See also ==
- Decter
