= Progressive Conservative Party of Manitoba candidates in the 1986 Manitoba provincial election =

The Progressive Conservative Party of Manitoba fielded a full slate of 57 candidates in the 1986 provincial election, and won 26 seats to remain as the Official Opposition in the Legislative Assembly of Manitoba. Many of the party's candidates have their own biography pages; information on others may be found here.

== Brent Aubertin (Concordia) ==
Brent Aubertin has campaigned for public office at the provincial and municipal levels.

Electoral record
Election	Division	Party	Votes	%	Place	Winner
1986 provincial	Concordia	Progressive Conservative	2,684	32.25	2/4	Gary Doer, New Democratic Party
1986 municipal	Winnipeg City Council; Springfield Heights ward	n/a	1,191	21.52	2/6	Shirley Timm-Rudolph
