= Russ Wyatt =

Canadian politician (born 1970)

Winnipeg City Councillor for Transcona
- In office October 26, 2022 – October 28, 2026
- Preceded by: Shawn Nason
- Succeeded by: Lora Meseman
- In office October 23, 2002 – October 24, 2018
- Preceded by: Shirley Timm-Rudolph
- Succeeded by: Shawn Nason

Personal details
- Born: December 21, 1970 (age 55) Winnipeg, Manitoba, Canada
- Education: University of Winnipeg
- Occupation: City Councillor; Management, Development, and Municipal Planning Consultant

Russ Wyatt (born 1970) is a Canadian politician in Winnipeg, Manitoba. He represented Transcona on the Winnipeg City Council from 2002 to 2018, and again from 2022 to 2026. At times, he served as a member of the city's executive policy committee. His father, Reg Wyatt, was a councillor from 1983 to 1986.

== Early life and career ==
Wyatt studied Political Science at the University of Winnipeg and worked for the Wyatt Insurance Group, a family company, before entering public life. In the 1990s, he was an assistant to Transcona councillor Rick Boychuk and chairman of the East Kildonan-Transcona residents advisory group.

In 1993, Wyatt recommended that the City of Winnipeg introduce "park-and-ride" areas to improve public transportation. During the 1997 federal election, he argued that renewed debates over national unity were drawing attention away from pressing issues such as job creation, and credited the New Democratic Party as the only political party willing to discuss the economy. He led a petition drive against bus fare increases in 1998.

Wyatt planned to run for city council in the 1998 municipal election with an endorsement from the New Democratic Party of Manitoba, but withdrew just before the nomination deadline. He led a citizen's campaign to preserve Transcona's health centre in 2000, and criticized the provincial government of Gary Doer when it chose to move the centre.

At the time of the 2002 municipal election, Wyatt was the director of communications for the Association of Manitoba Municipalities.

== City councillor ==
=== First term (2002–2006) ===
Wyatt was elected to city council for Transcona in the 2002 municipal election, at age 32. He was no longer affiliated with the NDP by this time, and ran without a party endorsement. He called for improved municipal infrastructure, and an increased police presence in his ward. After the election, he was appointed to the city's protection and community services committee.

Wyatt soon developed a reputation as a hard-working councillor and a vocal defender of his ward's interests. He also emerged as a prominent opponent of Mayor Glen Murray, with whom he frequently clashed at council meetings. While some accused Wyatt of grandstanding, and of acting in an undiplomatic manner, Wyatt achieved broad popularity in his community for his brash style, support for residents, and no-nonsense attitude toward public policy and government.

Police services

Wyatt opposed Winnipeg's 2002 police restructuring plan, in part because his ward was slated to lose its station to the St. Boniface area. Following unsuccessful attempts to block the plan on council, he launched a billboard campaign that called for Transconans to protest Murray's handling of the issue. Murray described this move as "very unprofessional", adding that it was based on the flawed assumption that he was personally driving the policy. Council approved the restructuring plan in July 2003.

Other issues

Wyatt remained a vocal supporter of public transportation, and endorsed rapid transit services for Winnipeg in 2002. He opposed Mayor Murray's plans to introduce a sales tax, on the grounds that it would unfairly target the city's working and middle classes. He also proposed a "Taxpayer's Bill of Rights" in 2004, arguing that it could be used to give citizens a direct vote on new taxes and major capital investments.

Wyatt indicated his support for urban reserves in June 2003, as a means of alleviating poverty among aboriginal communities in Winnipeg. In the same year, he argued that Winnipeg had fallen behind in its efforts to hire greater numbers of women and visible minorities, and called for a department-by-department investigation into the existing state of employment equity programs. He also opposed the possibility of private companies overseeing Winnipeg's trash services, arguing that municipal employees were more reliable.

2004 mayoral Election

When Glen Murray resigned halfway through his term as Mayor of Winnipeg in 2004 to run for the federal Liberal Party in the House of Commons of Canada, Wyatt considered running for mayor in the by-election that followed, but eventually chose to endorse Garth Steek. He said that he was impressed with Steek's "law and order" focus, and particularly his pledge to crack down on the Hells Angels biker gang. Later he became disillusioned with the Steek campaign, however, and suggested that Steek was actually trying to ensure the election of rival candidate Sam Katz by attacking Katz's more serious opponents and otherwise keeping a low profile. Katz won the election, while Steek finished a distant fifth.

Rapid Transit review task force

Wyatt initially sought to improve his relationship with the mayor after the 2004 Mayoral by-election. He supported Mayor Katz's decision to shelve a rapid transit bus line in September 2004 and was appointed chair of the city's Rapid Transit Review Task Force the following month. After several months of public consultation, the Wyatt and the task force called for Winnipeg to re-establish a rapid transit plan with a more citywide focus.

The task force later removed Katz's preferred option of a downtown light-rail system, following a second round of consultations. This created a rift between Katz and Wyatt, and by the summer of 2005 Wyatt had returned to his previous role as a critic of the administration. The task force ultimately recommended a bus transit corridor. When the final report was submitted, Wyatt expressed concern that Katz's inner circle would cherry-pick its least expensive recommendations and simply ignore the rest. By 2008, he accused Winnipeg Transit of watering down the report beyond all recognition, and described the task force's work as a waste of public money.

Veteran Winnipeg activist Nick Ternette criticized the task force's conclusions, arguing that light rail transit is more effective than bus rapid transit.

Other issues

Wyatt opposed the provincial government's plan to construct the Waverley West suburb in 2005, arguing that it would incur significant infrastructural costs. He voted against Sam Katz's anti-panhandling bylaw later in the same year. Wyatt supported malathion spraying to target the city's mosquito population, and supported an unsuccessful motion to introduce term limits in March 2006.

=== Second term (2006–2010) ===
2006 election

Wyatt was re-elected in the 2006 municipal election with 85.2% of the vote in his ward. He was endorsed by the Winnipeg Labour Council, and by an "OlyOpp group" of businesses opposing the OlyWest project. He described his victory as a message for Gary Doer's NDP government, and warned that Doer's support for OlyWest would hurt him in the next provincial campaign.

Executive Policy Committee

After the 2006 election, Mayor Katz surprised many political observers by appointing Wyatt to the municipal cabinet (officially known as the executive policy committee) as downtown committee chair. Some described this as a savvy move on Katz's part, in that it would shift Wyatt's opposition from the council chamber to the political backrooms. Wyatt was also named chair of a municipal Red Tape Commission in February 2007, and was appointed to the municipal Housing Commission the following month.

Wyatt openly disagreed with Katz on several issues. He was the only cabinet member to oppose the creation of an Assiniboine Park Conservancy in June 2007, arguing that he could not support more private-sector control of the city's parklands. In September 2007, he broke with the mayor and voted in favour of a proposed commission into police conduct. He later criticized Winnipeg's decision to ban pesticides, describing it as part of a "national fad". He was strongly critical of Katz's decision to close the Disraeli Freeway for sixteen months in 2008, and to permit Canadian Pacific Railway queue-ups in the Transcona area. On one occasion, Wyatt argued that Katz was undermining Transcona's interests with these decisions, and accused him of supporting only "personal business friends or residents in places like South Tuxedo", an upscale south Winnipeg neighbourhood. Katz did not publicly reprimand Wyatt for these remarks, and kept him as a member of the municipal cabinet.

Wyatt called for a single agency to manage Winnipeg's downtown development in February 2008, arguing that existing responsibilities were divided among too many organizations. He has also supported calls for a municipal integrity commissioner, with ombudsman powers over all municipal governments in Manitoba.

Mayor Katz shuffled his municipal cabinet in October 2008, and gave Wyatt a new position as secretary of infrastructure renewal. Bill Clement, who chairs Winnipeg's public works and infrastructure renewal committee, expressed concern that Wyatt's new responsibilities would overlap with his own. Katz rejected this suggestion. One of Wyatt's first acts in his new position was to order a review of Winnipeg's unfunded infrastructure projects, which was issued in January 2009.

Following Katz's shuffle, Wyatt proposed the introduction of a 1% municipal sales tax to target road and bridge repairs. The provincial government was skeptical of the idea, and the Association of Manitoba Municipalities subsequently voted against pursuing the option.

In November 2008, Wyatt tabled a motion to have Winnipeg's chief administrative officer devise with a strategy for reducing environmentally damaging plastic bags. The motion was passed by a vote of 7-0 by the executive policy committee. Wyatt later supported a proposal by Jim Maloway to expand Winnipeg's Disraeli Bridge from four lanes to six.

At a December 2008 meeting of the Executive Policy Committee, Wyatt and fellow councillor Mike Pagtakhan unexpectedly voted against a $476.1 million public works plan on the grounds that it did not provide sufficient resources for bicycle and pedestrian trails. Both councillors later tried, without success, to have expenditures for these trails added to the budget at a regular meeting of council.

=== Third term (2010–2014) ===
2010 election

Russ Wyatt was handily re-elected in the 2010 Municipal Election defeating Vlad Kowalyk 9503 to 1885.

=== Fourth term (2014–2018) ===
Bowman administration

In October 2014, Brian Bowman was elected Mayor of Winnipeg. Wyatt was re-elected over his opponent, Ray Ulasy by a margin of 8,490 to 4,277 votes.

Nearing the end of his term, Wyatt took a leave of absence from his duties as City Councillor to attend rehab for drug and alcohol abuse.

On June 4, 2018, Wyatt announced that he identified as a member of the LGBTQ+ community, saying, "I came out in Rehab with the help of some amazing people. And I came out to my immediate family before today...I've been living in fear and in a secret double life and it's been very very hard and it's now over. I am grateful to be alive today." He did not run in the 2018 Winnipeg municipal election.

=== Fifth term (2022–2026) ===
In the 2022 Winnipeg municipal election, Wyatt was re-elected to a fifth term. He was defeated in 2026, placing fourth.

== Sexual assault charges ==
=== 2018 stayed charge ===
In July 2018, Wyatt was arrested by Winnipeg Police Service after being charged with sexual assault. These charges were stayed in June 2019. Wyatt has always maintained his innocence and credits the trauma of substance abuse and criminal charges as helping him rediscover religion, find sobriety, and turn his life around.

=== 2026 sexual assault charges ===
On March 24, 2026, Winnipeg Police Service arrested Wyatt and charged him with sexual assault and administering a noxious drug. According to WPS, "The survivor reported that in December 2025, he made acquaintance with another adult man on a social website, and they met in person on more than one occasion. During one of the occasions, they met at a residence in the east area of the city. While at the residence, the survivor was provided an illicit drug and sexually assaulted. After leaving, he sought medical attention."

On August 11, 2026, following investigation, Wyatt was charged with a third alleged sexual assault and administering a noxious substance, which occurred in 2023, as well as possession of seven grams of psilocybin in April 2026, following a search of his home.

== Electoral record ==
2002 Winnipeg municipal election: City Councillor, Transcona Ward
Candidate	Votes	%
Russ Wyatt	7,270	61.67
Carol Miles	3,042	25.81
Bob Cook	1,476	12.52
Total valid votes	11,788	100.00

2006 Winnipeg municipal election: City Councillor, Transcona Ward
Candidate	Votes	%
(x)Russ Wyatt	7,880	85.23
Gerald Basarab	785	8.49
Stephen Smith	581	6.28
Total valid votes	9,246	100.00
