= George Provost =

George Reginald Provost (August 11, 1936 - July 17, 2002) was a businessman and city councillor in Winnipeg, Manitoba, Canada. He served on council from 1977 to 1980, and later sought election to the Legislative Assembly of Manitoba.

== Councillor ==
Provost was a publisher, consultant and entrepreneur in private life. He served on the old St. Boniface City Council from 1964 to 1967, before the city was amalgamated into Winnipeg. He later sought re-election to the council in a 1970 by-election, but lost to rival candidate Michael Dennehy.

He was elected to Winnipeg City Council in the 1977 municipal election as an independent candidate, defeating incumbent councillor Ed Kotowich from the centre-right Independent Citizens' Election Committee (ICEC) in the Langevin ward. During a March 1978 debate on bus fares, Provost said that he would oppose any fare increase for senior citizens. He later voted with the majority on council to introduce bilingual English and French signs to Winnipeg. When confronting local opposition to this initiative, Provost said that there were many anti-French bigots in the city.

He was defeated for re-election in the 1980 municipal campaign, finishing third against independent candidate Evelyne Reese. The Globe and Mail newspaper indicates that he lost public support after railing against what he believed were fire hazards in municipal hospitals, even after an investigation concluded that he was mistaken.

== Later life ==
Provost later served as general manager of the Manitoba division of the Canadian Manufacturers' Association, and was appointed executive director and secretary treasurer of the Insurance Brokers Association of Manitoba Inc. in 1997. He also started a company called Showtime Marketing Services Ltd., and produced a series of novelty Manitoba license plates in 1994 to commemorate the province's 125th anniversary the following year.

Provost ran as a candidate of the Progressive Conservative Party of Manitoba in the 1981 provincial election, and finished a distant second against New Democratic Party candidate Gerard Lecuyer in Radisson. He sought re-election to city council in 1983 and 1992 but finished third against Evelyne Reese both times.

He was a candidate for the St. Boniface ward in the 1995 municipal election, but withdrew from the campaign before election day. He ran again in 1998, and finished third against incumbent councillor Dan Vandal. During this election, he identified property taxes as the most important issue facing the ward.

Provost ran for a seat on the St. Boniface School Board in a 1999 by-election, and finished second against Tricia Barnabe. He ran for another seat on the same board in a further by-election in 2000, and finished fourth against Laura Reimer.

He died on July 17, 2002, at age 65.
