= Lillian Thomas =

Canadian politician

Deputy Mayor of Winnipeg
- In office 1998–2003
- Preceded by: Jae Eadie
- Succeeded by: Dan Vandal

Secretary of Urban Aboriginal Opportunities (Winnipeg)
- In office 2004–2005
- Preceded by: position created
- Succeeded by: Mike Pagtakhan

Secretary of Intergovernmental Affairs (Winnipeg)
- In office 2003–2004
- Preceded by: Jae Eadie
- Succeeded by: position eliminated

Member of Winnipeg's Executive Policy Committee
- In office 1998–2005

Winnipeg City Councillor for Elmwood-East Kildonan Ward
- In office 2002–2010
- Preceded by: ward created
- Succeeded by: Thomas Steen

Winnipeg City Councillor for Elmwood
- In office 1989–2002
- Preceded by: Alf Skowron
- Succeeded by: ward eliminated

Personal details
- Born: Port Arthur, Ontario, Canada

Lillian Thomas (born 1949) was a city councillor in Winnipeg, Manitoba, Canada from 1989 until her retirement in 2010. She served on the council initially for Elmwood, and later for its successor ward of Elmwood-East Kildonan Ward.

== Early life ==
Thomas was born in Port Arthur, which is now part of Thunder Bay, Ontario. She has a Bachelor of Arts degree in Sociology from Lakehead University, and a Master of Arts degree in Sociology from the University of Manitoba. She is married to Len Dalman (1978), and they have a son, David (1985).

Thomas was a long-time member of the New Democratic Party.

== City councillor ==
Norrie and Thompson administrations (1989–1998)

Thomas was first elected to Winnipeg City Council in the 1989 municipal election, defeating veteran councillor Alf Skowron in the Elmwood ward. She was a member of the centre-left Winnipeg into the '90s (WIN) coalition that also included future mayor Glen Murray. In 1991, she served on a committee that recommended against the spraying malathion to combat the city's mosquito population.

Re-elected in 1992, Thomas soon emerged as an opponent of new mayor Susan Thompson, who succeeded five-term incumbent Bill Norrie. Thomas was appointed to both the Planning and Community Services Committee and the Protection, Parks and Culture Committee in 1993, when the left and right wings of council formed a temporary alliance to overturn Thompson's planned appointments.

Thomas opposed plans to build a new arena for the Winnipeg Jets hockey team in the mid-1990s. She also criticized municipal expenditures on the Charleswood Bridge, and called for the project's funding to be redirected toward infrastructure renewal. She supported Sunday shopping with some restrictions, and endorsed a 1994 proposal to extend benefits to the same-sex partners of civic employees.

Thomas was re-elected in 1995 over a strong challenge from former councillor Ray Brunka. Along with Glen Murray and Dan Vandal, she was one of only three WIN members returned to the new council. After the election, she was appointed to the Winnipeg Art Gallery board of governors, the Zoological Society of Manitoba and the medical advisory committee. In 1996, she opposed Mayor Thompson's proposed roll-back of municipal wages. Thomas was almost relieved of her three board positions in late 1996, as the result of a controversial process that many believe was politically motivated. She retained her positions with the Art Gallery board and medical advisory committee following a lengthy debate, but was removed from the Zoological Society. In 1997, she opposed businessman Sam Katz's proposal to construct a new baseball park in Winnipeg.

Thomas sought to become deputy speaker of the Winnipeg City Council in late 1997, but lost to John Prystanski.

The WIN organization dissolved after the 1995 campaign. Thomas received an endorsement from the New Democratic Party in the 1998 election, and was re-elected under its banner over another challenge from Ray Brunka. While seeking re-election, she highlighted her success in adding a social equity component to the City of Winnipeg Act, in order to add a social dimension to urban planning.

Murray administration

Thomas's ally Glen Murray was elected as Mayor of Winnipeg in 1998, and subsequently appointed Thomas to his Executive Policy Committee as Deputy Mayor. Over the next five years, she often represented the mayor at official events such as ribbon-cutting ceremonies and luncheons. She also served on the Fiscal Issues Committee.

Thomas called for the number of city councillors to be increased in this period, arguing that Winnipeg is too large to be governed by only fifteen representatives. She opposed term limits for councillors, and described anti-mosquito fogging as a "necessary evil". She also endorsed the principle of rent controls, after school trustee Mario Santos proposed their abolition.

In July 2001, Thomas announced a two million dollar investment in inner-city development with funding from the federal, provincial and municipal governments. Two months later, she was appointed to a provincial panel charged with charting the future of the Winnipeg region.

Thomas was re-elected in the 2002 municipal election, and retained her status as Deputy Mayor and her position on the Fiscal Issues Committee. She was a prominent supporter of Glen Murray's "new deal" plan for Winnipeg, and endorsed a full smoking ban in the city's public indoor spaces. She relinquished her responsibilities as Deputy Mayor in a November 2003 cabinet shuffle, and was appointed to oversee relations with the provincial government. Murray indicated that he made this appointment because Thomas was trusted by members of Gary Doer's administration.

In 2004, Thomas encouraged Manitoba New Democratic Party members to maintain their policy of endorsing Winnipeg council and school board candidates. Delegates overwhelmingly approved the policy at the party's convention.

Katz administration

Glen Murray resigned as mayor in mid-2004 to run for the House of Commons of Canada. Thomas supported Dan Vandal's bid to become his successor in the by-election that followed. The winning candidate was Sam Katz, whose platform Thomas had criticized. After the election, she opposed Katz's decision to shelve the implementation of a rapid transit plan for Winnipeg. She nevertheless retained her position in Katz's executive committee, and in October 2004 was shuffled to the position of Secretary for Urban Aboriginal Opportunities.

Thomas opposed Katz's plan to privatize municipal garbage collection in 2005, arguing that it would encourage private monopolies and drive prices upward in the long run. She also spoke against the mayor's plan to build condominiums in Assiniboine Park. She was dropped from the city's executive in October 2005.

Thomas subsequently charged that Katz was stalling the creation of urban aboriginal reserves, and took the unusual step of releasing her report on the subject before it was submitted to committee. She later opposed the establishment of an Olywest pork production plant in Winnipeg's east end, and pressured the city to remove its financial incentives for the project. The project was canceled in 2007.

Re-elected without difficulty in 2006, she soon emerged as one of Mayor Katz's most prominent critics on the new council. In early 2007, she spoke against Katz's plans to close the Kelvin Community Centre in her ward. She later voted against a private-public partnership for Winnipeg's Disraeli Bridge and Freeway, and endorsed Jim Maloway's proposal to expand the bridge from four to six lanes.

Thomas opposed plans for Winnipeg to spend $7 million to subsidize a Canada Inns private water park, expressing concern that low-income residents would not be able to afford access to the site. In March 2009, she supported an unsuccessful motion by councillor Dan Vandal that would have banned corporate and union donations in municipal elections.

In September 2010, Thomas announced she would retire rather than seek reelection in the following month's municipal elections. She was succeeded on the council by Thomas Steen.

== Federal politics ==
Thomas endorsed Bill Blaikie's bid for the federal New Democratic Party leadership in 2002. When Blaikie announced his retirement in 2007, she announced that she would consider seeking the party nomination for Elmwood—Transcona in the 2008 federal election. She eventually decided to stay in municipal politics.

== Electoral record ==
2006 Winnipeg municipal election: Elmwood-East Kildonan
Candidate	Votes	%
(x)Lillian Thomas	4,945	57.65
David J. Danyluk	1,657	19.32
Wally Roth	1,585	18.48
Isaiah Oyeleru	390	4.55
Total valid votes	8,577	100.00

2002 Winnipeg municipal election: Elmwood-East Kildonan
Candidate	Votes	%
(x)Lillian Thomas	5,971	50.25
Greg Bozyk	2,432	20.47
Ray Brunka	1,931	16.25
Bryan McLeod	1,548	13.03
Total valid votes	11,882	100.00

1998 Winnipeg municipal election: Councillor, Elmwood Ward
Candidate	Votes	%
(x)Lillian Thomas	5,725	54.34
Ray Brunka	3,907	37.08
Ed Pilbeam	904	8.58
Total valid votes	10,536	100.00

1995 Winnipeg municipal election: Councillor, Elmwood Ward
Candidate	Votes	%
(x)Lillian Thomas	4,005	37.77
Ray Brunka	3,127	29.49
Henry McDonald	1,742	16.43
Ed Mullis	745	7.02
Stefan Sigurdson	535	5.04
Michael Keating	451	4.25
Total valid votes	10,605	100.00

1992 Winnipeg municipal election: Councillor, Elmwood Ward
Candidate	Votes	%
(x)Lillian Thomas	6,708	57.99
Patrice McGrath	3,090	26.71
John Kubi	1,770	15.30
Total valid votes	11,568	100.00

1989 Winnipeg municipal election: Councillor, Elmwood Ward
Candidate	Votes	%
Lillian Thomas	2,333	48.97
(x)Alf Skowron	1,954	41.02
Mark Miller	477	10.01
Total valid votes	4,764	100.00

49 out of 51 polls reporting.

All electoral results from 1995 onward are provided by the City of Winnipeg. Results from 1989 and 1992 are taken from the Winnipeg Free Press newspaper.
