= 2002 Winnipeg municipal election =

Canadian local election

The 2002 Winnipeg municipal election was held on 23 October 2002 to elect a mayor, councillors and school trustees in the city of Winnipeg.

Glen Murray, the city's centre-left mayor, was re-elected to a second term over challenger Al Golden.

== Results ==
=== Mayor ===
2002 Winnipeg municipal election: Mayor of Winnipeg
Candidate	Votes	%
(x)Glen Murray	103,457	50.63
Allan Golden	76,749	37.56
David Lettner	14,199	6.95
Chris Henderson	7,270	3.56
Nick Ternette	2,665	1.30
Total valid votes	204,340	100.00

=== Councillors ===
2002 Winnipeg municipal election: Elmwood-East Kildonan
Candidate	Votes	%
(x)Lillian Thomas	5,971	50.25
Greg Bozyk	2,432	20.47
Ray Brunka	1,931	16.25
Bryan McLeod	1,548	13.03
Total valid votes	11,882	100.00

- Greg Bozyk was a sales representative for a security company at the time of the election. He indicated that he was putting $10,000 of his personal savings into the campaign. Boyzk supported budget increases for police and firefighters. After his defeat, he was quoted as saying, "The people of Elmwood deserve what they get. We're going to continue to be a have-not area... we're going to continue to be the Newfoundland of Winnipeg."

2002 Winnipeg municipal election: City Councillor, St. Boniface Ward
Candidate	Votes	%
(x)Dan Vandal	accl.	accl.

2002 Winnipeg municipal election: City Councillor, Transcona Ward
Candidate	Votes	%
Russ Wyatt	7,270	61.67
Carol Miles	3,042	25.81
Bob Cook	1,476	12.52
Total valid votes	11,788	100.00

- Carol Miles was the 44-year-old director of finance for the Canadian Food Grains Bank. She was endorsed by the New Democratic Party and the Winnipeg Labour Council, and called for community policing in areas with high crime.
- Bob Cook was a 57-year-old retired policeman and president of the Transcona Golf Club. His candidacy was supported by Shirley Timm-Rudolph, the ward's outgoing councillor. Cook called for an increased police presence in the community, and opposed a suggestion that Transcona's police station could be moved to another part of Winnipeg for efficiency purposes.

=== School trustees ===
Winnipeg School Division

2002 Winnipeg election, Winnipeg School Division, Ward Three (three trustees elected)
Candidate	Total votes	% of total votes
(incumbent)Mike Babinsky	10,892	23.97
(incumbent)Liz Ambrose	7,243	15.94
(incumbent)Roman Yereniuk	5,918	13.02
Luba Fedorkiw	5,158	11.35
Kevin Rebeck	3,644	8.02
Neri DiMacali	3,096	6.81
Don Smith	2,890	6.36
Alana Brownlee	2,820	6.21
Stan Tomchuk	2,371	5.22
Rylan Reed	1,405	3.09
Total valid votes	45,437	100.00

Electors could vote for three candidates. The percentages are determined in relation to the total number of votes.

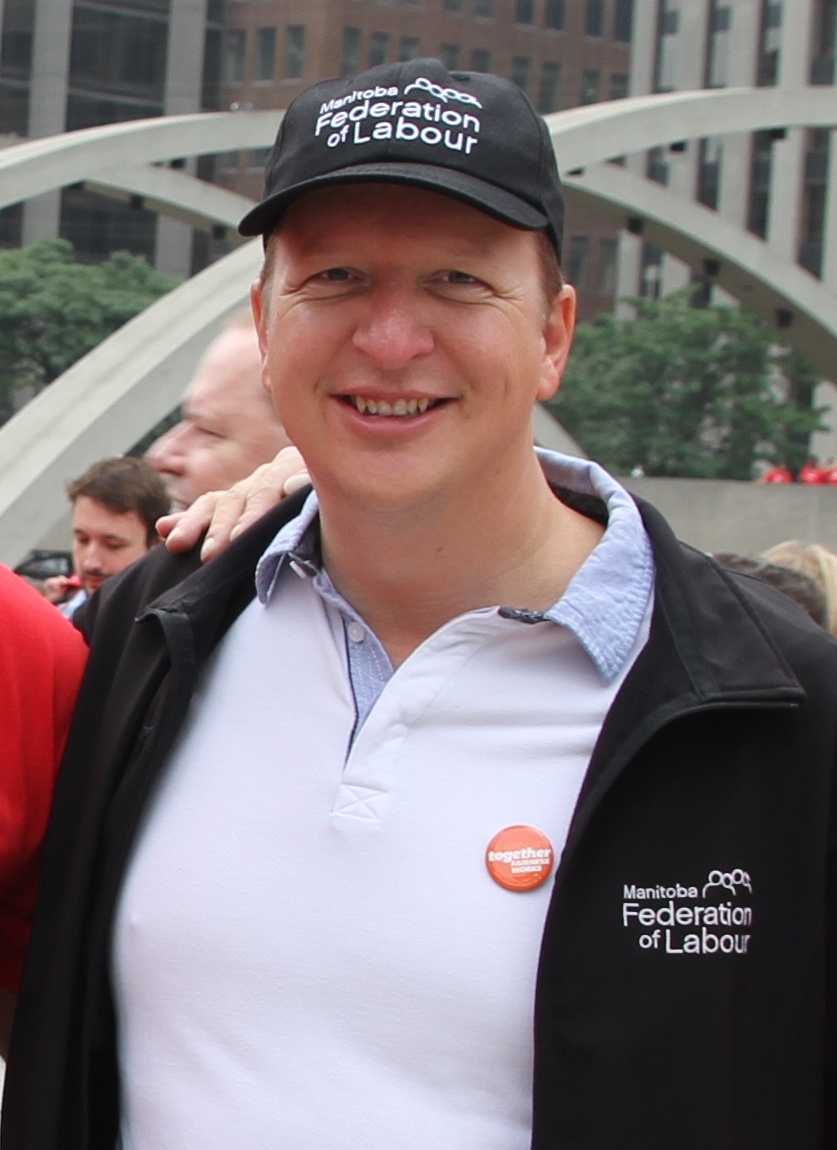
Rebeck at a Labour Day parade in 2013

- Kevin Rebeck is a Manitoba labour leader. He is a former records clerk with the Manitoba Workers Compensation Board, and joined the Canadian Union of Public Employees (CUPE) in 1991. He wrote against provincial workfare programs in 1995, arguing that they ignored the real problems of the job market while targeting the victims of high unemployment. He was chosen as vice-president of CUPE Manitoba in 1999, and became the union's interim president in late 2003 when Paul Moist left to lead the union's federal affiliate. Rebeck was confirmed as the president of CUPE Manitoba by provincial delegates in April 2004, and said that he would work to empower members at the local level. He has also served as vice-president of the Manitoba Federation of Labour, general vice-president for CUPE National, and second-vice president for the Winnipeg Labour Council. After the election of Stephen Harper's government in the 2006 federal election, he took part in an unsuccessful effort to preserve Canada's national child-care program. When CUPE Ontario endorsed a resolution supporting the international campaign to boycott Israel in 2006, Rebeck wrote a public letter indicating that no similar resolution had been passed by his organization. He wrote that the Israeli-Palestinian conflict was "complex", and called for dialogue that would "respect the legitimate aspirations of both the Palestinian and Israeli people". Rebeck sought the federal New Democratic Party nomination for Elmwood—Transcona in the buildup to the 2008 federal election, and received the support of the Manitoba Federation of Labour. He lost to Jim Maloway, who was later elected as the Member of Parliament for the riding.

River East Transcona School Division

2002 Winnipeg election, Trustee, River East Transcona School Division, Ward One (two members elected)
Candidate	Total votes	% of total votes
(incumbent)Colleen Carswell	5,041	33.46
(incumbent)Mary Andree	3,136	20.82
Ken Silk	2,856	18.96
Carl Schneiderat	2,846	18.89
Dwayne Charles	1,185	7.87
Total valid votes	15,064	100.00

Electors could vote for two candidates. Percentages are determined in relation to the total number of votes.

- Mary Andree was a school trustee in Transcona from 1962 to 2006. She served as chair of the Transcona-Springfield School Division on more than one occasion, and was elected to the successor River East Transcona School Division in 2002. Andree was temporarily removed from the Transcona-Springfield School Board in December 1968, after a former trustee brought forward a charge that she benefited financially from her position on the board. The presiding justice John R. Solomon dismissed the charge in January 1969, and reinstated her to the board. Andree described the charge against her as "malicious". She later opposed the creation of a separate Transcona-Springfield French School Board in 1985, arguing that there were not enough French-language students in the area to justify its creation. In 1994–95, she led the Transcona-Springfield Board in requiring school staff to take six days of unpaid leave over the course of the year. She helped adopt an Equity/Race Relations Policy for the division in 1996, and supported contracting out bus services in 2000. In 2005, she supported an unsuccessful attempt to rename Wayoata Elementary School after Terry Fox.

2002 Winnipeg election, Trustee, River East Transcona School Division, Ward Three
Candidate	Total votes	% of total votes
Bob Fraser	2,275	57.12
David Greskiw	879	22.07
Khalid Mahmood	829	20.81
Total valid votes	3,983	100.00

- Khalid Mahmood is a frequent candidate for public office in Winnipeg. He ran for city council in 1986 with an endorsement from the New Democratic Party, and later ran for a school trustee position in 1995, 1998 and 2002. He has served as president of the Pakistan Canada Cultural Equation of Manitoba. During celebrations marking the fiftieth anniversary of Pakistan's independence, he called for better relations between Pakistani and Indian Canadians. He has also been acting president of the Ahmadiyya Muslim Association. In the 2002 election, he called for tougher anti-bullying measures and supported standard tests. He was elected to the board of the Manitoba Association of Parent Councils for 2004-05 and 2005–06.

St. James-Assiniboia School Division

2002 Winnipeg election, Trustee, St. James-Assiniboia School Division, Kirkfield-St. Charles Ward (three members elected)
Candidate	Total votes	% of total votes
(incumbent)Linda Archer	5,561	28.50
Kelly de Groot	4,932	25.27
(incumbent)Bruce Chegus	4,375	22.42
(incumbent)Jan Paseska	2,531	12.97
Deborah Weddall	2,115	10.84
Total valid votes	19,514	100.00

== Subsequent by-elections ==
=== City council ===
- Natalie Pollock is a former musician and talk show host, and has campaigned for Mayor of Winnipeg three times. She attended Grant Park and Kelvin high schools in Winnipeg, and audited courses in Political Science at the University of Manitoba. She and her brother Ron Pollock worked as musicians in the 1960s and 1970s, under the names "Ron and Natalie O'Hara". Dionne Warwick produced one of their songs in 1968, and three of their songs hit Billboard Magazine's easy-listening charts in the early 1970s. Pollock later ran her father's podiatrist office, and unsuccessfully sought a Liberal Party nomination in the buildup to the 1984 federal election. In the late 1980s, she and her brother hosted a cable-access television program called "The Pollock and Pollock Gossip Hour". A report in the Winnipeg Free Press asserts that the program featured "off-beat political interviews" and "often-provocative dancing by Natalie". The show was canceled in 1990. Pollock subsequently brought forward a sexual discrimination complaint, asserting that she had been let go because the cable station believed viewers were bothered by her protrusive breasts. The cable station denied this, and said that the show was canceled for other reasons including "promoting sexual stereotypes". The complaint was subsequently dismissed. Pollock first campaigned for Mayor of Winnipeg in 1992 in the aftermath of this controversy, and finished fifth in a field of seventeen candidates. She ran again in 1995, promising to launch a constitutional challenge to prevent the sale of the Winnipeg Jets hockey team to the United States. She finished sixth out of seven candidates. In the 2004 by-election, she called for an aboriginal police chief and legal marriage for gays and lesbians, while opposing the privatization of municipal services, anti-smoking regulations, and the city's proposed Waverley West extension.

Winnipeg municipal by-election, June 22, 2004: Councillor, St. Boniface
Candidate	Votes	%
Franco Magnifico	7,610	38.22
Roland Marcoux	5,798	29.12
Tom Scott	2,003	10.06
Émile Chartier	1,737	8.72
Marcel Boille	1,071	5.38
Murray Cliff	1,040	5.22
Derek W.J. Hay	653	3.28
Total valid votes	19,912	100.00

- Roland Marcoux has a Bachelor of Science degree in Adult Education from the University of Minnesota, and has a background in consulting, training and economic development. He was elected president of the Old St. Boniface Residents' Association in December 2001, and held the position until 2005. He supported the federal-provincial-municipal Community Initiatives program, and championed development of Old St. Boniface as a residential rather than an industrial neighbourhood. Marcoux was elected to the board of directors of St. Boniface General Hospital in 2006, and became a director of Entreprises Riel in 2007. As of 2009, he is an associate director of the Esty Centre for Law and Economics in International Trade.
- Tom Scott was the owner and operator of a store called The Chocolate Affair on Provencher Boulevard at the time of the election. In 2002, he wrote a letter to the editor opposing councillor Dan Vandal's plans for tax credits that would promote residential housing in St. Boniface. Scott argued that the credits should support existing businesses instead. During the 2004 by-election, he pledged to revitalize Winnipeg's French Quarter with street-scaping and French-only signs. He supported a municipal effort to enhance Provencher Boulevard's francophone character after the election. He was the business community's liaison on a post-election project to enhance Provencher Boulevard's francophone character, *Émile Chartier was born and raised in the St. Boniface area of Winnipeg. He is a professional sculptor and a community activist. He was president of the Old St. Boniface Residents Association in the early 2000s, and served on a committee that reviewed proposals for Winnipeg's Provencher Bridge. Before running for office himself, he worked on campaigns for Dan Vandal and Greg Selinger. Chartier was the first declared candidate in the 2004 by-election. He called for new affordable housing projects, and promised to turn industrial land over to new developments. After the election, he opposed plans for a new condo development in an historically sensitive area of the ward. He opposed the city's decision to open a Salisbury House restaurant on the Provencher pedestrian bridge in 2005, and argued in favour of a restaurant that would promote Franco-Manitoban cuisine and culture. Surprisingly, Chartier supported incumbent Franco Magnifico against former councillor Dan Vandal in the 2006 municipal election. In 2007, Chartier and Denis Savoie created a popular 15-metre long sand sculpture at The Forks called "The Mosasaur". As of January 2009, Chartier serves on the board of directors of the Winnipeg Art Gallery.
- Marcel Boille was a real estate agent with Royal Lepage. He expressed frustration with the number of dilapidated homes in St. Boniface, and called for financial incentives for developers during the 2004 by-election. He was charged with not filing an audited list of donors after the election, and was prohibited from running in 2006. He pleaded not guilty when the charge was brought to court, arguing that the law was being selectively enforced. Newspaper accounts do not indicate how the matter was resolved.
- Derek W.J. Hay was the co-owner of three hotels at the time of the 2004 by-election. He promised a business approach to government, and proposed a small business park for an abandoned Canada Packers site in the ward. He was elected to a one-year term on the executive of the Manitoba Hotel Association in July 2004, shortly after the municipal by-election. In 2006, he was elected to the executive of the Gyro Club of Winnipeg. He campaigned against long-weekend alcohol bans in provincial campgrounds during the same period, arguing that his profits had declined since the ban was implemented in 1995. Hay was returned to the Board of Directors of the Manitoba Hotel Association in 2007, and was re-elected in 2008.
