= Terry Duguid =

Canadian politician

The Honourable Terry Duguid PC MP
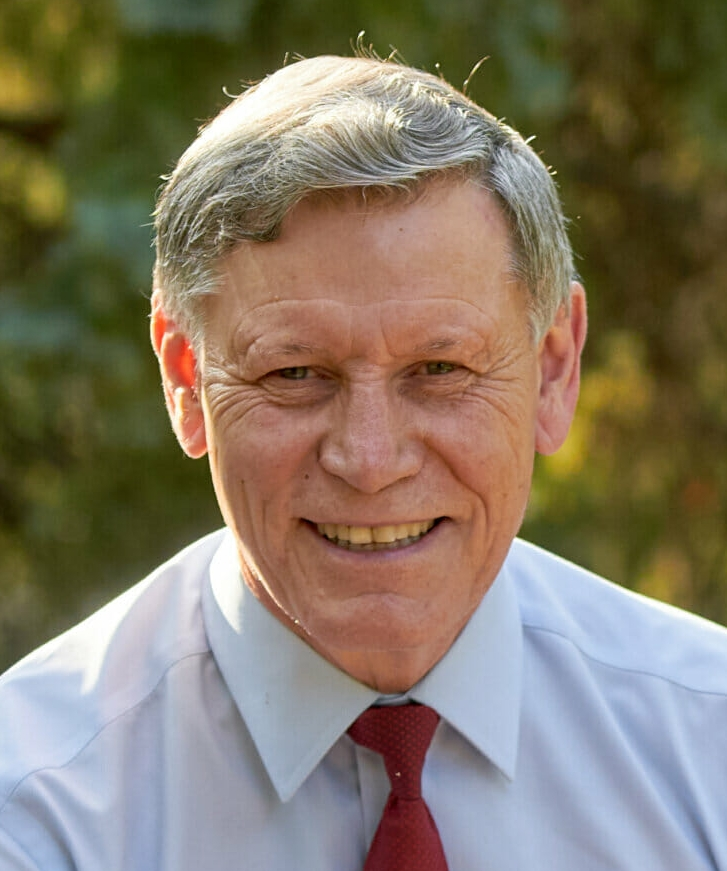
- Duguid in 2022

Minister of Environment and Climate Change
- In office March 14, 2025 – May 13, 2025
- Prime Minister: Mark Carney
- Preceded by: Steven Guilbeault
- Succeeded by: Julie Dabrusin

Minister of Sport
- In office December 20, 2024 – March 14, 2025
- Prime Minister: Justin Trudeau
- Preceded by: Carla Qualtrough
- Succeeded by: Adam van Koeverden

Minister responsible for Prairies Economic Development Canada
- In office December 20, 2024 – March 14, 2025
- Prime Minister: Justin Trudeau
- Preceded by: Dan Vandal
- Succeeded by: Eleanor Olszewski

Member of Parliament for Winnipeg South
- Incumbent
- Assumed office October 19, 2015
- Preceded by: Rod Bruinooge

Personal details
- Born: 1954 or 1955 (age 70–71) Winnipeg, Manitoba, Canada
- Party: Liberal
- Parent: Don Duguid
- Education: Carleton University (BSc); University of Calgary (MEDes)
- Occupation: Politician; non-profit organizer; executive

Terry Duguid PC MP (/ˈduːɡʊd/; born 1954 or 1955) is a Canadian politician. A member of the Liberal Party of Canada, he has been the Member of Parliament for Winnipeg South since the 2015 federal election. Duguid was Minister of Environment and Climate Change from March to May 2025 as well as Minister of Sport and Minister responsible for Prairies Economic Development Canada from December 2024 to March 2025. Before federal politics, he was on the Winnipeg City Council from 1989 to 1995.

== Background ==
Duguid was born in Winnipeg, Manitoba, the son of Georgina and professional curling athlete Don Duguid. Duguid holds a Bachelor of Science degree in Biology and a Master's Degree in Environmental Science. He has been involved in a variety of eco-business pursuits in the Winnipeg area, including being president of Sustainable Development International, and serving as chairman of the Manitoba Clean Environment Commission. He was president and CEO of the Gateway North Marketing Agency, which is responsible for ensuring the survival of the Port of Churchill and the Hudson Bay Rail Line. He is also the founding president of the International Centre for Infectious Diseases, a not-for-profit organization created after the outbreak of SARS to support and enhance the mandate of the Public Health Agency of Canada.

== Career ==
Prior to his entry to politics Duguid was an environmental activist. He was executive director of the Manitoba Liberal Party in the 1980s.

He served as a member of Winnipeg City Council from 1989 to 1995 for the wards of Miles MacDonell (20,000 constituents) and North Kildonan (40,000 constituents). He was chairman of the Public Works Committee. In that position he helped create Winnipeg's blue box recycling program. He stepped down as councillor to run for mayor of Winnipeg in 1995, but the incumbent mayor, Susan Thompson, was re-elected.

=== Post-city council ===
After municipal politics, Duguid was an executive in the not-for-profit sector. From 1995 to 1997, he was president and CEO of Gateway North International, working to secure a future for the rail line that leads to the Port of Churchill. He oversaw the transfer of both the rail line and the port, together worth $100 million, to a new owner.

From 1997 to 2000, he was president of Sustainable Development International, a consulting firm specializing in conservation and international management. From 2000 to 2004, Duguid was chairman of Manitoba's Clean Environment Commission, which is responsible for carrying out public hearings for major development projects, including forestry and hydro-electric development.

Duguid was the founding president of the International Centre for Infectious Diseases in Winnipeg, beginning as such in 2004 and serving until 2009. Duguid had been part of the original task force that set out to make recommendations to improve Canada's response to infectious disease outbreaks in the wake of the SARS epidemic of 2003, especially in Toronto. The task force recommended the establishment of ICID and the Public Health Agency of Canada, with both to be located in Winnipeg.

=== Federal politics ===
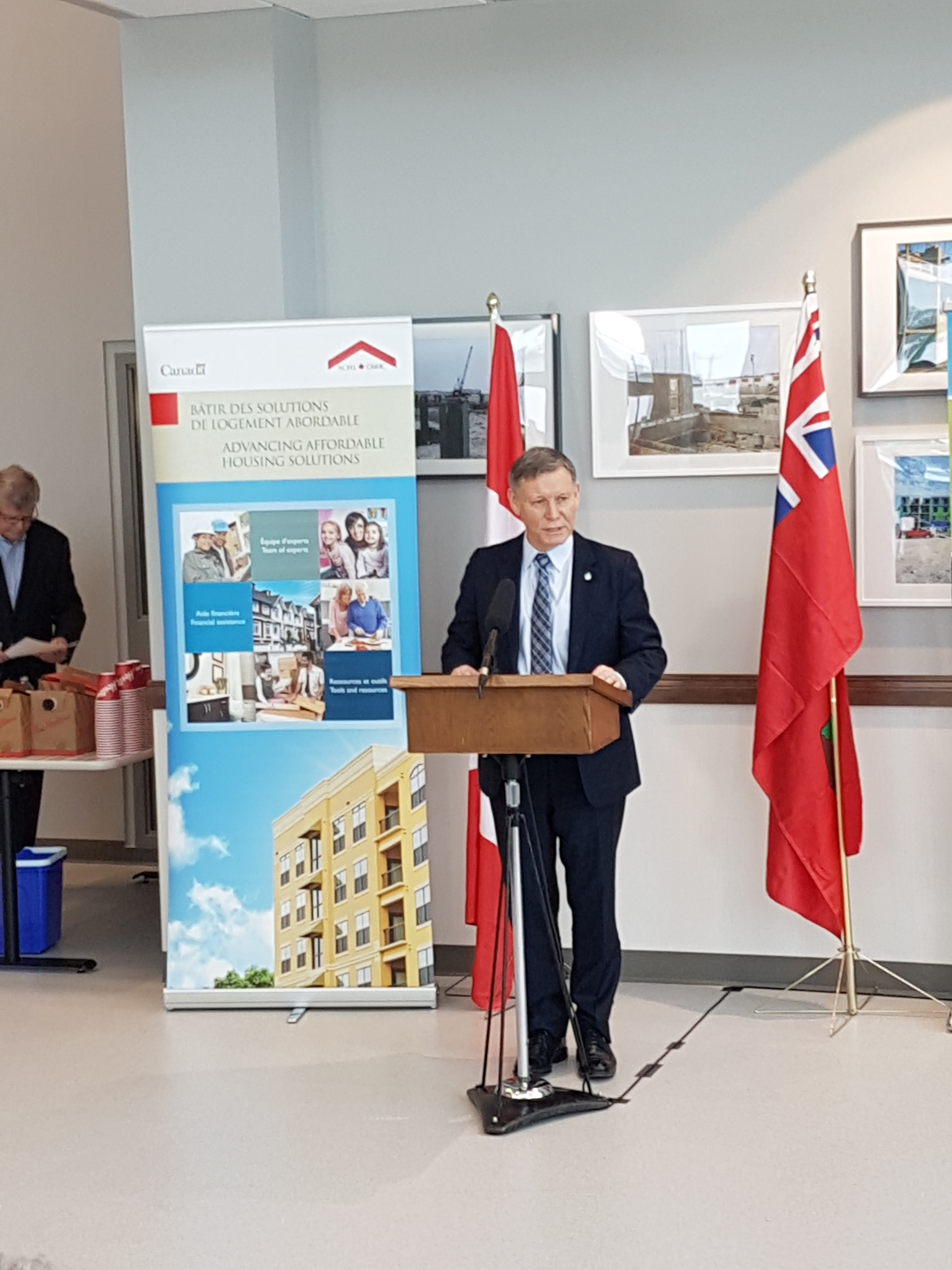
Duguid at a 2017 CMHC funding announcement as Parliamentary Secretary to the Minister of Families, Children, and Social Development.

In the 2004 Canadian federal election, Duguid was the Liberal candidate in the north Winnipeg riding of Kildonan—St. Paul, a riding previously held by Liberal MP Rey Pagtakhan, who chose to run in a different riding. Duguid narrowly lost (13582 votes to 13304) to Conservative candidate Joy Smith. He ran against Smith again in 2006, but Smith was re-elected in an election that saw the Conservatives win a minority government.

Duguid ran as the Liberal candidate in the riding of Winnipeg South in the 2011 Canadian federal election. He finished second behind the incumbent Conservative, Rod Bruinooge.

==== Winnipeg South Member of Parliament ====
The 2015 federal election again saw Duguid running as the Liberal candidate in Winnipeg South; this time he was elected as the Liberals replaced the Conservative majority government with one of their own, which also included winning six of Winnipeg's other seven House seats. After the election Duguid was appointed as parliamentary secretary to the Minister of Families, Children, and Social Development, Jean-Yves Duclos. Duguid was then named Parliamentary Secretary for the Status of Women on 28 January 2017, serving under Maryam Monsef. He was a member of the Canada-China Legislative Association and served as vice-chair of the group. He traveled together with multi-party colleagues of the association for a two-week tour through China in August 2017. Duguid was also a member and vice-chair of the Canada-Africa Parliamentary Association.

Duguid was appointed the government lead for the efforts to clean-up Lake Winnipeg by Catherine McKenna, Minister of Environment and Climate Change, in November 2017. He would direct $25.7 million in federal spending which flow through the Lake Winnipeg Basin Program to address toxic algae blooms. Duguid has served as the Parliamentary Secretary to the Minister of Environment and Climate Change since 3 December 2021.

A longtime advocate on clean water issues, Duguid was successful in advocating for the creation of the Canada Water Agency as well as successfully advocating for its headquarters to be established in Winnipeg.

He was elected chair of the Canadian House of Commons Standing Committee on Natural Resources in the 45th Canadian Parliament in 2025.

==== Cabinet Minister ====
Duguid was appointed as the minister of sport and the minister responsible for Prairies Economic Development Canada on December 20, 2024.

Duguid became Minister of Environment and Climate Change in Mark Carney's 30th Canadian Ministry in March 2025. After being reelected in the 2025 federal election in April, he was removed from cabinet in the subsequent shuffle on May 13.

== Electoral results ==
=== Federal ===
2025 Canadian federal election: Winnipeg South
Party	Candidate	Votes	%	±%	Expenditures
Liberal	Terry Duguid	27,287	58.78	+10.63	
Conservative	Janice Morley-Lecomte	16,315	35.14	+2.44	
New Democratic	Joanne Bjornson	2,093	4.51	–9.83	
People's	Johann Rempel Fehr	427	0.92	–2.42	
Green	Manjit Kaur	301	0.65	–0.83	
Total valid votes/expense limit					
Total rejected ballots					
Turnout		46,423	72.23		
Eligible voters		64,271			
Liberal notional hold		Swing		+4.10	
Source: Elections Canada

2021 Canadian federal election: Winnipeg South
Party	Candidate	Votes	%	±%	Expenditures
Liberal	Terry Duguid	22,423	47.46	+5.32	$101,968.67
Conservative	Melanie Maher	15,967	33.79	-4.92	$70,925.37
New Democratic	Aiden Kahanovitch	6,632	14.03	+0.09	$0.00
People's	Byron Curtis Gryba	1,542	3.26	+2.36	$4,177.84
Green	Greg Boettcher	681	1.44	-2.88	$436.79
Total valid votes/expense limit		47,245	–	–	$106,465.61
Total rejected ballots		346			
Turnout		47,591	67.65		
Eligible voters		69,825			
Source: Elections Canada

2019 Canadian federal election: Winnipeg South
Party	Candidate	Votes	%	±%	Expenditures
Liberal	Terry Duguid	20,182	42.14	-16.15	$82,362.08
Conservative	Melanie Maher	18,537	38.71	+4.04	$102,498.79
New Democratic	Jean-Paul Lapointe	6,678	13.94	+8.95	$41.24
Green	Paul Bettess	2,073	4.32	+2.27	$6,744.38
People's	Mirwais Nasiri	419	0.9	+0.9	$3,076.22
Total valid votes/expense limit		47,889	100.0		
Total rejected ballots		303	0.63	–	
Turnout		48,192	69.92		
Eligible voters		68,922			
Liberal hold		Swing		-10.10	
Source: Elections Canada

2015 Canadian federal election: Winnipeg South
Party	Candidate	Votes	%	±%	Expenditures
Liberal	Terry Duguid	28,096	58.29	+26.30	$131,358.55
Conservative	Gordon Giesbrecht	16,709	34.67	-17.07	$130,109.13
New Democratic	Brianne Goertzen	2,404	4.99	-9.15	$2,235.01
Green	Adam Smith	990	2.05	-0.08	$837.96
Total valid votes/expense limit		48,199	100.00		$198,589.24
Total rejected ballots		203	0.42	–	
Turnout		48,402	75.87	–	
Eligible voters		63,798			
Liberal gain from Conservative		Swing		+21.68	
Source: Elections Canada

2011 Canadian federal election: Winnipeg South
Party	Candidate	Votes	%	±%	Expenditures
Conservative	Rod Bruinooge	22,840	52.24	+3.41	$74,282.37
Liberal	Terry Duguid	14,296	32.70	-2.10	$65,648.93
New Democratic	Dave Gaudreau	5,693	13.02	+1.59	$8,116.60
Green	Caitlin McIntyre	889	2.03	-2.47	$564.35
Total valid votes/expense limit		43,718	100.00		–
Total rejected ballots		187	0.43	-0.01	
Turnout		43,905	69.80	+4.17	
Eligible voters		62,902	–	–	

2006 Canadian federal election: Kildonan—St. Paul
Party	Candidate	Votes	%	±%	Expenditures
Conservative	Joy Smith	17,524	43.13	+5.83	$58,321
Liberal	Terry Duguid	13,597	33.47	-3.06	$70,764
New Democratic	Evelyn Myskiw	8,193	20.17	-2.35	$16,314
Green	Colleen Zobel	1,101	2.71	+0.64	$0.00
Independent	Eduard Hiebert	213	0.52	–	$3,521
Total valid votes		40,628	100.00		–
Total rejected ballots		137	0.34	+0.02	
Turnout		40,765	66	+6	

2004 Canadian federal election: Kildonan—St. Paul
Party	Candidate	Votes	%	Expenditures
Conservative	Joy Smith	13,582	37.30	$53,156
Liberal	Terry Duguid	13,304	36.54	$64,174
New Democratic	Lorene Mahoney	8,202	22.53	$32,688
Green	Jacob Giesbrecht	756	2.08	$1,929
Marijuana	Rebecca Whittaker	290	0.80	not listed
Christian Heritage	Katharine Reimer	278	0.76	$1,475
Total valid votes/expenditure limit		36,412	100.00	71,091
Total rejected ballots		117		
Turnout		36,529	60.19	
Electors on the lists		60,689		
Percentage change figures are factored for redistribution. Conservative Party percentages are contrasted with the combined Canadian Alliance and Progressive Conservative percentages from 2000. Sources: Official Results, Elections Canada and Financial Returns, Elections Canada.

=== Municipal ===
1995 Winnipeg municipal election: Mayor of Winnipeg
Candidate	Votes	%
Susan Thompson	83,036	38.30
Peter Kaufmann	69,601	32.10
Terry Duguid	58,656	27.05
Nick Ternette	1,782	0.82
Theresa Ducharme	1,669	0.77
Natalie Pollock	1,079	0.50
Michael Grieger	1,007	0.46
Total valid votes	216,830	100.00

=== Provincial ===
1990 Manitoba general election: Rossmere
Party	Candidate	Votes	%	±%
Progressive Conservative	Harold Neufeld	3,893	42.33	
New Democratic	Maxine Hamilton	2,725	29.63	
Liberal	Terry Duguid	875	26.27	-1.22
Western Independence	Kathrina Cameron	163	n/a	
Total valid votes			100.00	
Rejected votes		25		
Turnout		9,222	74.46	
Registered voters		12,385		
Source: Elections Manitoba
