= Manitoba Federation of Labour =

Trade union centre

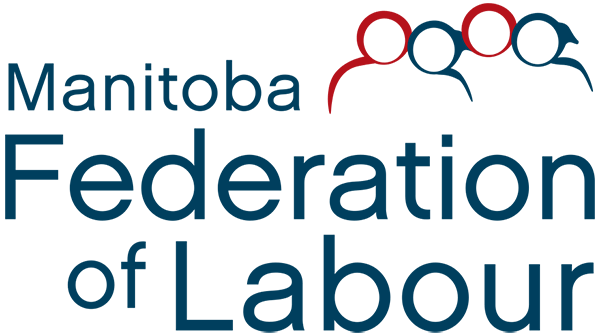
- Abbreviation: MFL
- Formation: 1956
- Type: Trade union centre
- Headquarters: Winnipeg, Manitoba, Canada
- Location: Manitoba, Canada
- Members: 125,000
- President: Kevin Rebeck
- Executive director: Anna Rothney
- Parent organization: Canadian Labour Congress
- Website: mfl.ca

The Manitoba Federation of Labour is the Manitoba provincial trade union federation of the Canadian Labour Congress. It was formed in 1956 and has a membership of 125,000 people working in the public and private sectors.
