= Shirley Timm-Rudolph =

Personal details
- Occupation: Interior designer, politician, school trustee

Shirley Timm-Rudolph was a politician from Winnipeg, Manitoba, Canada. She was a city councillor from 1986 to 1992 and again from 1995 to 2002, and served on the city's Executive Policy Committee from 1997 to 1998. Timm-Rudolph ran for the House of Commons of Canada in the 1988 federal election, and for Mayor of Winnipeg in a 2004 by-election.

== Early life and private career ==
Timm-Rudolph was raised in north-end Winnipeg, and was an interior designer before entering public life. She became a salesperson after leaving council in 1992, and established a consulting business in 2002. In 2004, she organized the charity Gold Spike Golf Tournament.

== Councillor ==
Timm-Rudolph first ran for Winnipeg City Council in the 1983 municipal election as a New Democrat in the Springfield Heights division, and narrowly lost to Jim Ragsdill. She ran again in 1986 as an independent, and was elected in a crowded field . She ran for the Canadian House of Commons in 1988 as a Liberal, and finished second against New Democratic Party incumbent Bill Blaikie in Winnipeg—Transcona.

Re-elected to a second term in 1989, Timm-Rudolph lost to fellow councillor Rick Boychuk in 1992 after redistribution forced the two incumbents to face one another. The 1992 contest was marked by extreme bitterness, with Boychuk accusing Timm-Rudolph of being in a conflict of interest situation. She was later cleared by a provincial investigation.

Timm-Rudolph served on the provincial Municipal Board after her 1992 defeat. She ran for re-election in 1995, and defeated Boychuk in a rematch. During this campaign, she proposed the creation of an auxiliary police force that would take care of simple tasks and allow officers to focus on more important matters. When asked about her political ideology, she responded "dead centre". A subsequent survey of voting patterns in early 1997 found her to be one of council's most independent members, voting with or against Mayor Susan Thompson's governing coalition depending on the issue.

Thompson appointed Timm-Rudolph as acting deputy mayor in November 1995, and named her to the executive policy committee (i.e. the municipal cabinet) in March 1997. She was initially the chair of the planning and services committee, and was reassigned as chair of the public works committee in November 1997. She voted against a bus fare reduction in 1998, arguing that it would lead to higher property taxes.

Timm-Rudolph was expected to face a difficult re-election contest in 1998, but instead won without difficulty after Russ Wyatt, her main opponent, decided to withdraw at the last minute. After the election, she became a prominent figure in the council's unofficial opposition to new mayor Glen Murray. She served on the board of the Winnipeg Convention Centre and remained a member of the public works committee, but was no longer its chair. Timm-Rudolph also served on several national boards in this period, including those of the Federation of Canadian Municipalities and the Yellowhead Highway. She was a critic of Winnipeg's restrictive anti-smoking legislation, and was one of only two councillors to vote against the 2001 operating budget.

Timm-Rudolph decided not to seek re-election in 2002, saying that she found it difficult to work with Glen Murray. She indicated that she wanted to start a consulting business and write children's books. She later said that her greatest accomplishment in office was facilitating the construction of a storm water retention basin in southeast Transcona, an area often plagued by flooding.

== Mayoral campaign ==
Timm-Rudolph was one of the first declared candidates for a 2004 mayoral by-election, which was called after Murray resigned to run for the House of Commons. She was initially considered a viable candidate, but did not establish a strong campaign organization. She finished a distant seventh against Sam Katz.

== Electoral record ==
Winnipeg municipal by-election, June 22, 2004: Mayor of Winnipeg
Candidate	Votes	%
Sam Katz	99,015	42.51
Dan Vandal	55,644	23.89
Allan Golden	34,562	14.84
MaryAnn Mihychuk	23,412	10.05
Garth Steek	16,497	7.08
Gordon Kirkby	1,986	0.85
Shirley Timm-Rudolph	801	0.34
Nelson P. Morrison	528	0.23
Natalie Pollock	453	0.19
Total valid votes	232,898	100.00

1998 Winnipeg municipal election: Councillor, Transcona Ward
Candidate	Votes	%
(x)Shirley Timm-Rudolph	12,223	82.49
Theresa Ducharme	2,594	17.51
Total valid votes	14,817	100.00

1995 Winnipeg municipal election: Councillor, Transcona Ward
Candidate	Votes	%
Shirley Timm-Rudolph	6,506	40.00
(x)Rick Boychuk	5,009	30.80
Bill Lyons	3,290	20.23
Gerald Basarab	967	5.95
Tyrone Alzubaidi	492	3.03
Total valid votes	16,264	100.00

1992 Winnipeg municipal election: Councillor, Transcona Ward
Candidate	Votes	%
(x)Rick Boychuk	7,800	47.12
(x)Shirley Timm-Rudolph	5,980	36.13
Andrea Lillian Reid	2,772	16.75
Total valid votes	16,552	100.00

1989 Winnipeg municipal election: Councillor, Springfield Heights Ward
Candidate	Votes	%
(x)Shirley Timm-Rudolph	2,428	58.82
Norm Stapon	890	21.56
Peter Graham	810	19.62
Total valid votes	4,128	100.00

1988 Canadian federal election: Winnipeg—Transcona
Party	Candidate	Votes	%
New Democratic	Bill Blaikie	17,361	41.13
Liberal	Shirley Timm-Rudolph	13,460	31.88
Progressive Conservative	Mike Thompson	10,815	25.62
Western Independence	Fred Cameron	308	0.73
Independent	Gerry West	156	0.37
Marxist–Leninist	Karen Naylor	115	0.27
Total valid votes		42,215	100.00
Total rejected ballots		130	0.31
Turnout		42,345	75.47
Electors on the lists		56,110	

1986 Winnipeg municipal election: Councillor, Springfield Heights Ward
Candidate	Votes	%
Shirley Timm-Rudolph	2,254	40.72
Brent Aubertin	1,191	21.52
Cliff Annable	1,010	18.25
Khalid Mahmood	734	13.26
Michelle Juba	265	4.79
Stephen Keki	81	1.46
Total valid votes	5,535	100.00

1983 Winnipeg municipal election: Councillor, Springfield Heights Ward
Party	Candidate	Votes	%
Independent	(x)Jim Ragsdill	3,725	50.54
NDP	Shirley Timm-Rudolph	3,646	49.46
Total valid votes		7,371	100.00

== Footnotes ==
Preceded by Rick Boychuk	Winnipeg City Councillor, Transcona ward 1995-2002	Succeeded by Russ Wyatt
Preceded by Jim Ragsdill	Winnipeg City Councillor, Springfield Heights ward 1986-1992	Succeeded by ward eliminated
