= Harvey Secter =

Harvey Secter CM
- Education: University of Manitoba (BA); Harvard Law School (LLM)
- Scientific career
- Workplaces: University of Manitoba

Harvey Lyon Secter CM OM was the chancellor of the University of Manitoba, Canada, from 2010 to 2019. Secter received an honorary doctorate from the University of Winnipeg. Setter was mediator, negotiator prior to becoming Chancellor and owned his own business

Academic offices
Preceded by Bill Norrie	13th Chancellor of the University of Manitoba; 2010–2019	Succeeded by Anne Mahon
