= Decter =

Decter is a surname. Notable people with the surname include:

- Duke Decter (born 1970), American guitarist and entertainer
- Ed Decter (born 1959), American film director
- Midge Decter (1927–2022), American journalist and author
- Moshe Decter (1921-2007), American Jewish activist
- Shari Decter Hirst, Canadian politician
