= Manitoba School Boards Association =

The Manitoba School Boards Association (formerly known as the Manitoba Association of School Trustees) is a voluntary organization of public school boards in Manitoba, Canada. Its stated purpose is to "enhance the work of locally elected school boards through leadership, advocacy and service, and to champion the cause of public education for all students in Manitoba".
