= 1998 Winnipeg municipal election =

The 1998 Winnipeg municipal election was held on October 28, 1998 to elect a mayor, councillors and school trustees in the city of Winnipeg.

Centre-left candidate Glen Murray defeated populist right-winger Peter Kaufmann in the mayoral contest.

== Results ==
=== Mayor ===
1998 Winnipeg municipal election: Mayor of Winnipeg
Candidate	Votes	%
Glen Murray	112,078	50.55
Peter Kaufmann	101,509	45.78
Carlos Rule	1,894	0.85
Manny Does	1,886	0.85
Wally Welechenko	1,732	0.78
Nelson Morrison	1,425	0.64
Alex Reid	1,200	0.54
Total valid votes	221,724	100.00

=== Councillors ===
1998 Winnipeg municipal election: Councillor, Elmwood Ward
Candidate	Votes	%
(x)Lillian Thomas	5,725	54.34
Ray Brunka	3,907	37.08
Ed Pilbeam	904	8.58
Total valid votes	10,536	100.00

- Ed Pilbeam is a welder, and was president of the Chalmers Community Club in the 1990s. Pilbeam was 39 years old during the 1998 election, and made tax relief and crime his primary issues.

1998 Winnipeg municipal election: City Councillor, St. Boniface Ward
Candidate	Votes	%
(x)Dan Vandal	11,789	63.98
Gerry Duguay	4,825	26.19
George Provost	1,811	9.83
Total valid votes	18,425	100.00

- Gerald Duguay was 59 years old in 1998, and owned Duguay Pool Services. He first sought election to Winnipeg City Council in 1980 as a candidate of the centre-right Independent Citizens' Election Committee, and finished second against Evelyne Reese in the Langevin ward. In 1998, he argued that property taxes were the primary issue in his ward. After losing the election, he said he felt sorry for St. Boniface residents.

1998 Winnipeg municipal election: Councillor, Transcona Ward
Candidate	Votes	%
(x)Shirley Timm-Rudolph	12,223	82.49
Theresa Ducharme	2,594	17.51
Total valid votes	14,817	100.00

=== School trustees ===
1998 Winnipeg election, St. James-Assiniboia School Board, Silver Heights-Booth Ward (three members elected)
Candidate	Total votes	% of total votes
(incumbent)Ron Marshall	4,193	22.71
(incumbent)Sandra Paterson-Greene	3,678	19.92
Dennis Wishanski	3,476	18.82
Robert Wilson	2,857	15.47
Craig McGregor	2,365	12.81
Stephen Schultz	1,897	10.27
Total valid votes	18,466	100.00

Electors could vote for three candidates. Percentages are determined in relation to the total number of votes.

- Ron Marshall was a St. James-Assiniboia School Trustee from 1992 to 2006, and chaired the board's finance committee for a time. In 1993, he criticized as inaccurate a University of Manitoba report that suggested Winnipeg residents did not trust the city's public school system. Two years later, he opposed his board's decision to close Jameswood School, saying that its low teacher-student ratio made it the envy of other schools in the city. In 2001, he supported a new theatre project for Sturgeon Creek Collegiate. He retired in 2006. Marshall supported the "consensus approach" of the St. James-Assiniboia board, and said that trustees should avoid partisan politics.
- Sandra Paterson-Greene first campaigned for a seat on the St. James-Assiniboia School Board in 1986 under the name Sandra Paterson, and was narrowly defeated for the final position. She was elected in 1995, and re-elected in 1998, 2002 and 2006. Paterson-Greene has served as chair of the Assiniboia-St. James board's education and divisional multipurpose committees. In 2001-02, she spearheaded an effort to build a new theatre at Sturgeon Creek Collegiate. The board rejected the proposal in September 2002, by a vote of 6-3. In early 2003, she called on the federal government to toughen its laws against marijuana.

1998 Winnipeg election, Transcona-Springfield School Division, Ward One (three members elected)
Candidate	Total votes	% of total votes
(incumbent)Colleen Carswell	3,771	25.06
(incumbent)Mary Andree	3,153	20.95
David George	2,646	17.58
Gerald Basarab	2,105	13.99
Gary Komadowski	1,983	13.18
Greg Andrushko	1,390	9.24
Total valid votes	15,048	100.00

Electors could vote for three candidates. Percentages are determined in relation to the total number of votes.

- David George was first elected in 1998, and opposed the contracting out of bus services in 2000. He did not seek re-election in 2002.

1998 Winnipeg election, Transcona-Springfield School Division, Ward One (three members elected)
Candidate	Total votes	% of total votes
Jamie Boychuk	2,229	16.70
(incumbent)Laurie Goodman	2,163	16.21
(incumbent)Marilyn Lamoureux	2,018	15.12
(incumbent)George Marshall	1,994	14.94
Bill Lyons	1,780	13.34
Jim Way	1,268	9.50
Tom Halas	1,227	9.19
Eric Stearns	666	4.99
Total valid votes	13,345	100.00

Electors could vote for three candidates. Percentages are determined in relation to the total number of votes.

- Bill Lyons is a retired city clerk in Winnipeg. He was the city's planning committee clerk for many years, and became the chair of its board of adjustment in 1992. By 2000, he was executive director of the Transcona Business Improvement Zone. He was also a perennial candidate for public office, running for the Transcona ward on city council in 1989 and 1995, and for the Transcona-Springfield School Board in 1986 and 1998. He was defeated each time. Lyons called for a solution to Transcona's flooding problems in 1995, and supported the principle of having fewer managers and more front-line workers at city hall.
