= Winnipeg Labour Council =

Canadian labour council

The Winnipeg Labour Council is a labour council based in Winnipeg, Manitoba, Canada. Chartered by the Canadian Labour Congress, it represents 50,000+ workers in Winnipeg through 27 affiliated labour unions.

== List of affiliated unions ==
- ACTRA
- Amalgamated Transit Union, Local 1505
- Bakery Confectionery & Tobacco Workers International Union Local 389
- UNIFOR, Locals 144, 100-550, 101-6, 101-35, 468, 561, 2169, 2002, 3003, 3005, Locals 7, 341, 681, 816, 821, 830
- Canadian Office & Professional Employees Union, Locals 225 & 342
- Canadian Union of Public Employees, Locals 110, 500, 1475, 2348, & CUPE Manitoba
- Canadian Union of Postal Workers, Locals 856 & 819
- Construction and Specialized Workers Union Local 1258
- International Association of Theatrical & Stage Employees, Locals 63 & 856
- International Association of Machinists & Aerospace Workers, Locals 741, 1919, 1953, 2603
- International Union of Operating Engineers Local 987
- International Brotherhood of Electrical Workers, Local 2034 & 2085
- Manitoba Federation of Union Retirees
- Manitoba Government and General Employees' Union
- Telecommunications Employees Association of Manitoba
- United Steelworkers of America, Locals 3239 & 1-830
- United Steelworkers of America Affiliate Locals (Winnipeg Labour Council), Locals 4297, 7292, 7386, 7826, 7975, 8283, 9355
- United Food & Commercial Workers Local 832
- United Firefighters of Winnipeg, Local 867
- University of Winnipeg Faculty Association
- University of Manitoba Faculty Association
- Heat and Frost Insulators and Allied Workers Local 99

List accurate as of August 2024
