= 1992 Winnipeg municipal election =

The 1992 Winnipeg municipal election was held on October 28, 1992 to elect a mayor, councillors and school trustees in the city of Winnipeg.

Susan Thompson defeated Greg Selinger in the mayoral contest.

== Results ==
=== Councillors ===
1992 Winnipeg municipal election: Councillor, Elmwood Ward
Candidate	Votes	%
(x)Lillian Thomas	6,708	57.99
Patrice McGrath	3,090	26.71
John Kubi	1,770	15.30
Total valid votes	11,568	100.00

- Patrice McGrath was a first-time candidate. She was a taxi driver in Winnipeg during the 1990s. In 1993, she wrote a letter criticizing the existing welfare system in the city. She argued in favour of job creation with incentives, rather than cutbacks for single employable persons.
- John Kubi was a first-time candidate. During the late 1990s, he served on a panel that reviewed George Cuff's recommendations for restructuring Winnipeg's municipal government. Kubi argued that Cuff's recommendations would centralize decision-making and reduce public consultation, and recommended its rejection. He was a member of the River East Neighbourhood Network in 2002, and called for a greater police presence in the area. As of 2007, he is a member of the East Kildonan-Transcona Resident Advisory Group.

1992 Winnipeg municipal election: Councillor, Transcona Ward
Candidate	Votes	%
(x)Rick Boychuk	7,800	47.12
(x)Shirley Timm-Rudolph	5,980	36.13
Andrea Lillian Reid	2,772	16.75
Total valid votes	16,552	100.00

- Andrea Lillian Reid chaired an advisory committee on the Transcona Community Revitalization Program before running for public office.

=== Mayor ===
1992 Winnipeg mayoral election
Candidate	Votes	Percentage
Susan Thompson	89,743	39.01%
Greg Selinger	75,123	32.66%
Dave Brown	31,859	13.85%
Ernie Gilroy	26,001	11.30%
Natalie Pollock	1,311	0.57%
Dan Zyluk	833	0.36%
Darryl Soshycki	727	0.32%
Walter Diawol	553	0.24%
Menardo A. Caneda	534	0.23%
Martin Barnes	526	0.23%
James W. Miller (Pin The Elder)	500	0.22%
Bryan R. Benson	491	0.21%
Bob McGugan	433	0.19%
Charles-Alwyn Scotlend	421	0.18%
Ed Hay	374	0.16%
Aurel Joseph Prefontaine	348	0.15%
Rudolph Parker	267	0.12%
Total	230,044	100.00%

=== School trustees ===
==== Winnipeg School Division ====
1992 Winnipeg municipal election: Winnipeg School Board, Ward Three (three members elected)
Candidate	Votes	%
(x)Edward Kowalchuk	7,529	15.24
(x)Roman Yereniuk	6,601	13.36
Bill Sanderson	6,342	12.84
Debi Ann Spence	4,948	10.02
Chris Kowalski	4,587	9.29
Ray Reeves	4,314	8.73
Luba Fedorkiw	4,251	8.60
Frank Unger	3,497	7.08
Angelina Olivier-Job	3,041	6.16
Roy Price	2,314	4.68
Wayne Rumley	1,978	4.00
Total valid votes	49,402	100.00

Results taken from the Winnipeg Free Press.

Electors could vote for three candidates. Percentages are determined in relation to the total number of votes.

- Bill Sanderson is an aboriginal Canadian. He was raised in St. Laurent on the Red River, and was educated in Canada's notorious residential school system. He has a degree in Education from the University of Manitoba, and successfully lobbied for the creation of an all-aboriginal Winnipeg high school in 1991. He was elected to the Winnipeg School Board in the 1992 election with the support of the New Democratic Party, and was subsequently chosen as its vice-chairman. He attracted some controversy in 1993, when he accused fellow trustee Betty Granger of racism. The following year, he brought forward a successful motion to have the all-aboriginal Aberdeen Elementary School renamed as Niji Mahkwa. He also supported a motion to teach tolerance toward homosexuals in Winnipeg's public schools in 1994, comparing the social struggles of homosexuals with those of aboriginal Canadians. In 1995, he called for a distinct aboriginal school division in Manitoba. Sanderson became involved in another controversy in 1995, in the period after MaryAnn Mihychuk resigned as chairman of the board. Sanderson argued that he should have automatically succeeded to the position by virtue of his vice-chairmanship; a majority of trustees, however, elected Anita Neville to the position. Sanderson then accused the trustees who voted against him of having been motivated by racism, a charge which they rejected. Fellow trustee Ed Kowalchuk, who had supported Sanderson, said that his support for an aboriginal school division had made him unpopular with other members of the board. He campaigned for re-election in 1995 as an independent, having previously disagreed with the New Democratic Party trustees on budget cuts. He was defeated, finishing eighth in a field of sixteen candidates.

==== Transcona-Springfield School Division ====
1992 Winnipeg election, Transcona-Springfield School Division, Ward One (three members elected)
Candidate	Total votes	% of total votes
(incumbent)Mary Andree	3,075	19.83
(incumbent)Betty Ann Watts	2,595	16.73
Colleen Carswell	2,347	15.14
(incumbent)Wally Stoyko	2,160	13.93
Gerald Basarab	1,728	11.14
Shannon Coughlin	1,444	9.31
Royce Hanson	1,345	8.67
Theresa Ducharme	813	5.24
Total valid votes	15,507	100.00

Electors could vote for three candidates. Percentages are determined in relation to the total number of votes.

- Wally Stoyko was listed as a retired school principal in a 2005 newspaper article.
