= 1983 Winnipeg municipal election =

The 1983 Winnipeg municipal election was held on October 26, 1983 to elect a mayor, councillors and school trustees in the city of Winnipeg. There were also two referendum questions, on bilingualism and nuclear disarmament.

Bill Norrie defeated Brian Corrin in the mayoral contest.

== Results ==
1983 Winnipeg municipal election: Councillor, Springfield Heights Ward
Party	Candidate	Votes	%
Independent	(x)Jim Ragsdill	3,725	50.54
NDP	Shirley Timm-Rudolph	3,646	49.46
Total valid votes		7,371	100.00

- Jim Ragsdill was elected to Winnipeg City Council in 1977, and re-elected in 1980 and 1983. He was a vocal critic of Winnipeg's civil service during the early 1980s. He did not seek re-election in 1986.

1983 Winnipeg municipal election: Councillor, Stevenson Ward
Party	Candidate	Votes	%
Independent	(x)Bob Douglas	5,734	87.85
NDP	Jim Maloway	793	12.15
Total valid votes		6,527	100.00

Results taken from the Winnipeg Free Press newspaper, 27 October 1983.
