= Bill Norrie =

Canadian politician (1929–2012)

Bill Norrie CM OM QC

39th Mayor of Winnipeg
- In office 1979–1992
- Preceded by: Robert Steen
- Succeeded by: Susan Thompson

Honorary Consul-General of Japan in Winnipeg
- In office 1998–2008
- Preceded by: Otto Lang
- Succeeded by: Kenneth Zaifman

Personal details
- Born: January 21, 1929 St. Boniface, Manitoba
- Died: July 6, 2012 (aged 83) Winnipeg, Manitoba

William Norrie CM OM QC (January 21, 1929 – July 6, 2012) was the 39th Mayor of Winnipeg, Manitoba, and was a onetime Chancellor of the University of Manitoba. Norrie was also involved in various charities, and once chaired the United Way of Winnipeg's annual campaign.

In August 1992 Norrie's son Duncan was killed in a plane crash over Nepal. Duncan was honoured by having a street in Winnipeg named after him.

Norrie had been the Honorary Consul-General of Japan in his later years, and he received the Order of the Rising Sun, Gold Rays with Neck Ribbon, in Spring 2009.

Academic offices
Preceded by Arthur Mauro	12th Chancellor of the University of Manitoba; 2001–2009	Succeeded by Harvey Secter
