= Transcona-Springfield School Division =

Former school division in Manitoba

Coordinates: 49.897°N 97.017°W

The Transcona-Springfield School Division is a former school division in Manitoba. The Transcona portion of TSSD 12 merged with the River East School Division in 2002 to create the new River East Transcona School Division. The Springfield portion merged with other eastern divisions to create the Sunrise School Division.
