= 1989 Winnipeg municipal election =

Canadian local election

The 1989 Winnipeg municipal election was held on October 25, 1989 to elect a mayor, councillors and school trustees in the city of Winnipeg.

Bill Norrie was re-elected to a fifth term as mayor without serious opposition.

== Results ==
=== Councillors ===
1989 Winnipeg municipal election: Councillor, Elmwood Ward
Candidate	Votes	%
Lillian Thomas	2,333	48.97
(x)Alf Skowron	1,954	41.02
Mark Miller	477	10.01
Total valid votes	4,764	100.00

49 out of 51 polls reporting.

- Mark Miller was a first-time candidate. There is a Manitoba resident named Mark Miller who serves as executive director of the Manitoba Ozone Protection Industry Association, and who campaigned for the council of the Rural Municipality of Springfield in 2002 and 2006. It is not clear if this is the same person.

1989 Winnipeg municipal election: Councillor, Springfield Heights Ward
Candidate	Votes	%
(x)Shirley Timm-Rudolph	2,428	58.82
Norm Stapon	890	21.56
Peter Graham	810	19.62
Total valid votes	4,128	100.00

- Peter Graham was a first-time candidate.

=== School trustees ===
==== Transcona-Springfield School Division ====
1989 Winnipeg election, Transcona-Springfield School Division, Ward One (three members elected)
Candidate	Total votes	% of total votes
(incumbent)Mary Andree	2,280	25.82
Betty Ann Watts	2,112	23.91
(incumbent)Wally Stoyko	1,921	21.75
(incumbent)Tom Low	1,367	15.48
Greg Muzychka	1,152	13.04
Total valid votes	8,832	100.00

Electors could vote for three candidates. Percentages are determined in relation to the total number of votes.
