= 1995 Winnipeg municipal election =

Canadian local election

The 1995 Winnipeg municipal election was held on October 25, 1995 to elect a mayor, councillors and school trustees in the city of Winnipeg.

Susan Thompson defeated Peter Kaufmann and Terry Duguid in the mayoral contest.

== Results ==
=== Mayor ===
1995 Winnipeg municipal election: Mayor of Winnipeg
Candidate	Votes	%
Susan Thompson	83,036	38.30
Peter Kaufmann	69,601	32.10
Terry Duguid	58,656	27.05
Nick Ternette	1,782	0.82
Theresa Ducharme	1,669	0.77
Natalie Pollock	1,079	0.50
Michael Grieger	1,007	0.46
Total valid votes	216,830	100.00

=== Councillors ===
1995 Winnipeg municipal election: Councillor, Elmwood Ward
Candidate	Votes	%
(x)Lillian Thomas	4,005	37.77
Ray Brunka	3,127	29.49
Henry McDonald	1,742	16.43
Ed Mullis	745	7.02
Stefan Sigurdson	535	5.04
Michael Keating	451	4.25
Total valid votes	10,605	100.00

- Ed Mullis worked as a tax specialist in Montreal before leaving to work in Winnipeg's Union Gospel Mission in 1987. He later founded Forward House Ministries, and became the chaplain at Winnipeg International Airport. He ran for city council in 1995 at age 50, arguing that schools would need to teach morality to counter the threat of youth street crime. He supported curfews, and floated the possibility of "boot camps". Mullis indicated that he was not a member of any political party. He is a Christian and a Biblical literalist, and has spoken of his personal opposition to homosexuality and the ordination of women.
- Stefan Sigurdson was a fifty-year-old painting and decorating contractor. He called for provincial lottery profits to be used to reduce property taxes and finance infrastructure. He also called for the contracting out of municipal services.
- Michael Keating was a 34-year-old employee in Revenue Canada's tax department. He called for a crackdown on welfare cheats. and for the contracting out of municipal services.

1995 Winnipeg municipal election: City Councillor, St. Boniface Ward
Candidate	Votes	%
Dan Vandal	10,036	56.90
(x)Evelyne Reese	7,603	43.10
Total valid votes	17,639	100.00

- Former councillor George Provost initially sought election for this ward, but withdrew from the campaign before election day.

1995 Winnipeg municipal election: Councillor, Transcona Ward
Candidate	Votes	%
Shirley Timm-Rudolph	6,506	40.00
(x)Rick Boychuk	5,009	30.80
Bill Lyons	3,290	20.23
Gerald Basarab	967	5.95
Tyrone Alzubaidi	492	3.03
Total valid votes	16,264	100.00

- Tyrone Alzubaidi was 32 years old at the time of the election, and was a service station operator. He said he was running because many residents disapproved of Rick Boychuk's job performance.

=== School trustees ===
==== Transcona-Springfield School Division ====
1995 Winnipeg election, Transcona-Springfield School Division, Ward One (three members elected)
Candidate	Total votes	% of total votes
(incumbent)Colleen Carswell	3,166	20.21
(incumbent)Mary Andree	2,766	17.66
(incumbent)Betty Ann Watts	2,645	16.89
Gerald Basarab	2,184	13.94
Linda Collette	1,758	11.22
Kim Milne	1,295	8.27
Royce Hanson	1,118	7.14
Linda Regey	731	4.67
Total valid votes	15,663	100.00

Electors could vote for three candidates. Percentages are determined in relation to the total number of votes.
