= 1986 Winnipeg municipal election =

Canadian local election

The 1986 Winnipeg municipal election was held on October 22, 1986, to elect a mayor, councillors and school trustees in the city of Winnipeg.

Bill Norrie was re-elected to a fourth term as mayor, defeating former Member of the Legislative Assembly Russell Doern and ten other candidates.

29 councillors elected in 29 separate single-member wards.

== Results ==
=== Councillors ===
1986 Winnipeg municipal election: Councillor, Glenlawn Ward
| Party | Candidate | Votes | % |
|---|---|---|---|
| Liberal | Bob Rose | 2,825 | 53.44 |
| Conservative | (x)Al Ducharme | 2,461 | 46.56 |
Source: City of Winnipeg

1986 Winnipeg municipal election: Councillor, Springfield Heights Ward
| Candidate | Votes | % |
|---|---|---|
| Shirley Timm-Rudolph | 2,254 | 40.72 |
| Brent Aubertin | 1,191 | 21.52 |
| Cliff Annable | 1,010 | 18.25 |
| Khalid Mahmood | 734 | 13.26 |
| Michelle Juba | 265 | 4.79 |
| Stephen Keki | 81 | 1.46 |
| Total valid votes | 5,535 | 100.00 |

- Cliff Annable was born in Kindersley, Saskatchewan in 1947, and was raised in Saskatoon. He joined the Royal Canadian Air Force as an Air Crew Officer after graduating from high school. Annable lived in Winnipeg from 1970 to 1987, and unsuccessfully sought a position on the Winnipeg City Council in 1983 and 1986. He supported the Progressive Conservative Party of Manitoba in this period. He later moved to Surrey, and was the owner of the South Surrey Eagles hockey team from 1993 to 2000. Annable is president and CEO of Commerce Pacific Holdings Ltd. He was elected as a councillor in White Rock in 2002. He was at the centre of an unusual controversy in June 2003, when rival councillor Margaret Woods punched him in the head during a heated debate about paving issues. (Annable asserted that Woods also jabbed him in the face with a pen, although she denied this.) Woods was charged with one count of common assault, which was later stayed. Annable did not seek re-election to the White Rock council in 2005, but instead ran for a seat on the Surrey City Council as a candidate of the centre-right Surrey Electors Team. He was narrowly defeated for the final position. In January 2008, he was appointed to Surrey's Parks and Community Services Committee.
- Michelle Juba appears to have been a first time candidate.
