= Susan Thompson =

40th mayor of Winnipeg, Manitoba

Susan Thompson OM

40th Mayor of Winnipeg
- In office 1992–1998
- Preceded by: Bill Norrie
- Succeeded by: Glen Murray

Personal details
- Born: 1946 or 1947 (age 78–79)
- Education: University of Winnipeg (BA)

Susan Ann Thompson OM was the 40th mayor of Winnipeg, Manitoba. She was born on 12 April 1947. She was the first woman to serve as mayor of Winnipeg, serving two terms from 1992 to 1998.

Thompson graduated with a BA from the University of Winnipeg in 1971. Thompson worked at Eaton's and Hudson's Bay Company in Winnipeg, Calgary, and Montreal. Because of her father's decline in health, she came back to Winnipeg in 1980 and bought the family's business Birt Saddlery. While running Birt Saddlery, she worked hard to promote women in business and became involved in Rotary and the Chamber of Commerce.

Thompson's second term saw the 1997 Flood of the Century; she was instrumental in directing the fight against the raging river. She choose not to seek a third term, but in 1999 she became Canada's Consul General in Minneapolis, United States - the first woman to have this position in its thirty years of existence. In this role she steadfastly promoted Canadian business and political interests. In 2003, she became first and founding president and CEO of the University of Winnipeg Foundation. She remained in this position until 2011.

In 2014, Thompson made local headlines after a 30-minute speech she gave to the Winnipeg Chamber of Commerce. In it she outlined her ideas for the city's future which included a laser pyramid Portage and Main.

In 2017, a building at the Winnipeg City Hall Campus was renamed the Susan A. Thompson Building after her.

The City of Winnipeg Archives has the Susan Thompson Fonds including of textual records, photograph albums, framed memorabilia, and artifacts.
