= Winnipeg City Council =

Governing body of the city of Winnipeg, Canada

Winnipeg City Council (French: Conseil municipal de Winnipeg) is the governing body of the city of Winnipeg, Manitoba, Canada. The Council is seated in the Council Building of Winnipeg City Hall.

The composition of the Council consists of fifteen city councillors and a mayor. Each councillor represents an individual ward throughout the city. The mayor is elected every four years by a vote of the entire city.

== Overview ==
Part 3 of The City of Winnipeg Charter legislates the composition of Winnipeg City Council, which currently consists of 15 councillors and the Mayor. Each councillor represents an individual ward while the mayor is elected by a vote of the city-at-large.

Councillors have a dual role: they are members of Council, dealing with decisions that affect the whole city; and members of the Community Committees, dealing with issues within local communities.

=== Wards ===
==== Current wards ====
Name	Population (2016)
St. James	49,118
Point Douglas	47,063
St. Norbert - Seine River	47,765
St. Vital	49,377
Charleswood - Tuxedo - Westwood	45,947
North Kildonan	44,664
Waverley West	44,006
St. Boniface	47,174
Mynarski	49,808
Fort Rouge - East Fort Garry	46,770
River Heights - Fort Garry	50,667
Old Kildonan	47,155
Daniel McIntyre	46,882
Elmwood-East Kildonan	44,268
Transcona	44,581

==== Past wards ====
Into its first civic election on 5 January 1874, Winnipeg had a total of 4 city wards—North, South, East, and West.

The city's wards were reorganized in 1881, with the addition of Fort Rouge as Ward One, and existing wards to the north of the Assiniboine River being reorganized into Wards Two through Six. In 1906, Elmwood was added as Ward Seven in 1906, becoming was the city's first extension across the Red River. These seven wards were collapsed into three in 1920: Wards One and Two became Ward One; Wards Three and Four became Ward Two; and Wards Five, Six, and Seven became Ward Three.

Following the amalgamation of Winnipeg, the new unified Council represented 50 wards.

== History ==
=== Early years ===
Winnipeg officially became incorporated as a city on 8 November 1873, with the passing of An Act to Incorporate the City of Winnipeg by the Manitoba Legislature. Among other things, the Act outlined the essential powers for Winnipeg City Council. The Act also dictated qualifications for candidates who wished to run for mayor or alderman in the city's first election. They had to be male freeholders or householders; natural born or naturalized subjects of the British Crown; 21 years of age or more; and resident in the city for at least 3 months prior to the election.

With a total of 4 city wards—North, South, East, and West—Winnipeg's first civic election took place on 5 January 1874, resulting in the election of Francis Evans Cornish as the first mayor of Winnipeg. In addition, the city's first elected aldermen were:

- John Byron More, William Gomez Fonseca, and Alexander Logan — North Ward
- James McLenaghan, Herbert Swinford, Thomas Scott (resigned 12 May 1874), and John Robson Cameron — South Ward
- W. B. Thibaudeau, Andrew Strang, and Robert Mulvey — East Ward
- James H. Ashdown, Archibald Wright, and John Higgins — West Ward

At this time, the mayor was elected for a one-year term; this would remain until 1955, when the term of office for the mayor was changed to two years. The first Winnipeg City Council established standing committees on finance, printing, board of works, markets, fire & water, and assessment. Council subsequently began to establish itself through the passage of by-laws, with 27 by-laws being passed in the city's first year of incorporation. After the first election, candidates were required to meet a property qualification; this requirement for alderman was abolished in 1918 and for mayoralty candidates in 1920 through a Charter amendment.

The city's wards were reorganized in 1881, with the addition of Fort Rouge as Ward One, and existing wards to the north of the Assiniboine River being reorganized into Wards Two through Six. In 1906, Elmwood was added as Ward Seven in 1906, becoming was the city's first extension across the Red River. These seven wards were collapsed into three in 1920: Wards One and Two became Ward One; Wards Three and Four became Ward Two; and Wards Five, Six, and Seven became Ward Three.

While the norm in the city's early years was for local elected officials to be English Protestants, there were still exceptions who won elections: Arni Frederickson (Ward 5, 1891) and Arni Eggertson (Ward 4, 1906) were Icelandic; Moses Finkelstein and Altar Skaletar (Ward 5, 1912) were Jewish; and Theodore Stefanik (Ward 5, 1911) was the first Ukrainian elected to City Council.

Over a decade after the first election, in 1887, civic suffrage was afforded to women in Winnipeg, 80 of whom being eligible to vote in that year's civic election and 476 in the election of 1888. In regards to holding office, however, women would not able to in Winnipeg until 1916, after which Alice A. Holling in 1917 (Ward 7) became the first woman to run for Council. (Holling lost to Alexander McLennan, 693 to 358.) In December 1920, Jessie Kirk became the first woman elected to Council, serving a two-year term on Council for Ward 2; she was, however, defeated each time in subsequent elections in 1922, 1923, 1926, and 1934.

The 1920 election that elected Jessie Kirk also saw city elections begin to use proportional representation in the form of Single Transferable Voting. There were three six-seat wards, with three elected in alternating years. Each voter casting only one (transferable) vote. Usually mixed crops of councillors were elected in the multi-member wards. PR was used until 1970 for city elections. (STV was also used to elect Winnipeg MLAs from 1920 to 1952.)

The 1922 election elected Edward Parnell as mayor. He is one of only two Winnipeg mayors to die in office, dying on June 9 of the following year. Robert Steen was the second dying in 1979

=== Metro Winnipeg ===
In 1955, the Government of Manitoba created the Greater Winnipeg Investigating Commission to look into inter-municipal issues in the Greater Winnipeg area. The Commission took four years and concluded with the recommendation that a strong central government be formed, which resulted in the incorporation of the Metropolitan Corporation of Greater Winnipeg (Metro Winnipeg) in 1960.

From 1960 until 1971, the Metro Winnipeg administrative system included Winnipeg and 12 other municipalities under a single metropolitan government, in a "two-tier" system in which councillors were elected through single transferable vote. In this framework, each municipality managed their own affairs, levied their own taxes, and took responsibility for local roads, water, and parks. In addition to this, however, an additional metropolitan level of government existed as well, which held responsibility for planning major roads, parks, and water and sewer systems.

In the late 1960s, a reform model was proposed for making this system more efficient and coordinated. Under this model, the coordination of policy and administration was to be facilitated by the close cooperation of a Board of Commissioners, who would act as the senior officers of the city's civil service, and the 50-member City Council with its 3 standing committees (Finance, Environment, and Works and Operations). In order to deliver services at the local level, the city was to be divided into 13 community committee areas, with each community committee composed of the City Councillors within the given community's boundaries.

=== Unicity ===
On 27 July 1971, the City of Winnipeg Act incorporated the City of Winnipeg (1874–1971); the rural municipalities of Charleswood, Fort Garry, North Kildonan, and Old Kildonan; the Town of Tuxedo; the cities of East Kildonan, West Kildonan, St. Vital, Transcona, St. Boniface, and St. James-Assiniboia; and the Metropolitan Corporation of Greater Winnipeg into one city, commonly referred to as unicity.

The unicity system replaced the two-tier metropolitan system with first-past-the-post voting.

The election of the first new Winnipeg City Council was held on 6 October 1971. A mayor and 50 coumcillors were elected. The new City came into legal existence on 1 January 1972. Beginning in 1972, the new unified Council consisted of 50 councillors, one elected from each of the city's 50 wards, and a mayor, elected by voters in the city-at-large. The inaugural meeting of the new City Council subsequently took place in the Council Chamber of the Winnipeg Civic Centre on 4 January 1972.

The number of councillors were reduced to 29 part-time councilors in 1977. It was then further reduced to 15 full-time councillors in 1991 when the Government of Manitoba passed Bill 68, which took effect in the 1992 municipal election and has stayed the same for subsequent elections.

== List of Winnipeg City Councils ==
=== 2006–2010 ===
Councillor	Ward	Roles	Notes
Sam Katz	—N/a	Mayor	
Jeff Browaty	North Kildonan		
Bill Clement†	Charleswood-Tuxedo		Died May 3, 2010.
Scott Fielding	St. James-Brooklands		
Jenny Gerbasi	Fort Rouge-East Fort Garry		
Harry Lazarenko	Mynarski		
Brenda Leipsic	River Heights-Fort Garry	Deputy Mayor (2006-2008)	Died December 9, 2008.
Grant Nordman	St. Charles		
Mike O'Shaughnessy	Old Kildonan		
John Orlikow	River Heights-Fort Garry		Elected in by-election on March 17, 2009.
Mike Pagtakhan	Point Douglas		
Harvey Smith	Daniel McIntyre		
Gord Steeves	St. Vital		
Justin Swandel	St. Norbert	Deputy Mayor (2008-2010)	
Lillian Thomas	Elmwood-East Kildonan		
Dan Vandal	St. Boniface		Former Deputy Mayor (2003-2004)
Russ Wyatt	Transcona		

=== 2010–2014 ===
Councillor	Ward	Roles	Notes
Sam Katz	—N/a	Mayor	
Jeff Browaty	North Kildonan		
Ross Eadie	Mynarski		
Scott Fielding	St. James-Brooklands		
Jenny Gerbasi	Fort Rouge-East Fort Garry		
Paula Havixbeck	Charleswood-Tuxedo		
Brian Mayes	St. Vital		Elected in by-election on November 26, 2011, following resignation of Gord Steeves.
Grant Nordman	St. Charles	Acting Deputy Mayor and Council Speaker	
John Orlikow	River Heights-Fort Garry		
Mike Pagtakhan	Point Douglas	Deputy Speaker	
Devi Sharma	Old Kildonan		
Harvey Smith	Daniel McIntyre		
Thomas Steen	Elmwood-East Kildonan		
Gord Steeves	St. Vital		Resigned in 2011 to run in the provincial election.
Justin Swandel	St. Norbert	Deputy Mayor (2010-2014)	
Dan Vandal	St. Boniface		Former Deputy Mayor (2003-2004)
Russ Wyatt	Transcona		

=== 2014–2018 ===
Councillor	Ward	Roles
Brian Bowman	—N/a	Mayor
Jenny Gerbasi	Fort Rouge-East Fort Garry	Deputy Mayor
Cindy Gilroy	Daniel McIntyre	Acting Deputy Mayor
Marty Morantz	Charleswood-Tuxedo	
Jason Schreyer	Elmwood-East Kildonan	
Ross Eadie	Mynarski	
Jeff Browaty	North Kildonan	
Devi Sharma	Old Kildonan	
Mike Pagtakhan	Point Douglas	
John Orlikow	River Heights-Fort Garry	
Matt Allard	St. Boniface	
Shawn Dobson	St. Charles	
Scott Gillingham	St. James-Brooklands	
Janice Lukes	St. Norbert	
Brian Mayes	St. Vital	
Russ Wyatt	Transcona	

=== 2018–2022 ===
Councillor	Ward	Role(s)
Brian Bowman	—N/a	Mayor
John Orlikow	River Heights - Fort Garry	Deputy Mayor Council Representative – Partnership of the Capital Region
Vivian Santos	Point Douglas	Acting Deputy Mayor Chairperson – Mayor’s Advisory Committee on Heritage, Culture & Art
Kevin Klein	Charleswood - Tuxedo - Westwood	Councillor Responsible for Assiniboine Park Conservancy
Cindy Gilroy	Daniel McIntyre	Chairperson – Winnipeg Housing Steering Committee Secretary of the End Homelessness Strategies UN Women Safe Cities Global Initiative Steering Committee
Jason Schreyer	Elmwood-East Kildonan	
Sherri Rollins	Fort Rouge - East Fort Garry	Council Representative – Mayor’s Indigenous Advisory Council
Ross Eadie	Mynarski	Deputy Speaker
Jeff Browaty	North Kildonan	
Devi Sharma	Old Kildonan	Speaker
Matt Allard	St. Boniface	Council Liaison – Francophone and Francophile Cities Network Council Liaison – Intermodal Connectivity Council Liaison – Labour Relations
Scott Gillingham	St. James	Council Representative – Partnership of the Capital Region Council Liaison – Veteran and Military Affairs North American Strategy for Competitiveness (NASCO)
Markus Chambers	St. Norbert - Seine River	Chairperson – Winnipeg Police Board
Brian Mayes	St. Vital	Councillor Responsible for Assiniboine Park Conservancy Council Liaison – School Board and Youth Opportunities
Shawn Nason	Transcona	
Janice Lukes	Waverley West	

=== 2022–2026 ===
Councillor	Ward
Scott Gillingham	Mayor
Evan Duncan	Charleswood-Tuxedo-Westwood
Cindy Gilroy	Daniel McIntyre
Jason Schreyer (until April 30, 2025); Emma Durand-Wood (since October 25, 2025)	Elmwood-East Kildonan
Sherri Rollins	Fort Rouge-East Fort Garry
Ross Eadie	Mynarski
Jeff Browaty	North Kildonan
Devi Sharma	Old Kildonan
Vivian Santos	Point Douglas
John Orlikow	River Heights-Fort Garry
Matt Allard	St. Boniface
Shawn Dobson	St. James
Markus Chambers	St. Norbert-Seine River
Brian Mayes	St. Vital
Russ Wyatt	Transcona
Janice Lukes	Waverley West

=== 2026–2030 ===
Councillor	Ward
Scott Gillingham	Mayor
Evan Duncan	Charleswood–Tuxedo–Westwood
Cindy Gilroy	Daniel McIntyre
Emma Durand–Wood	Elmwood-East Kildonan
Jeff Palmer	Fort Rouge–East Fort Garry
Natalie Smith	Mynarski
Jeff Browaty	North Kildonan
Greg McFarlane	Old Kildonan
Vivian Santos	Point Douglas
Sara McArthur	River Heights–Fort Garry
Matt Allard	St. Boniface
Kelly Ryback	St. James
Chris Sigurdson	St. Vital
Lora Meseman	Transcona
Jasmine Brar	Waverley West

== Pre-Unicity municipalities ==
Reeves and mayors of the municipalities within the Greater Winnipeg area prior to their amalgamation into Winnipeg on 27 July 1971.

Municipality (Type)	Incorporation or First election	First reeve/mayor
Assiniboia (RM, city)	1880; 1969 (City of St. James-Assiniboia)	William Tait (RM); A. W. Hanks (City of St. James-Assiniboia)
Charleswood (RM)	1913	George Chapman
East Kildonan (RM, city)	1914 (RM); 1957 (city)	D. Munroe (RM); George Nordland Suttie (city)
Fort Garry (RM)	1912	R. A. C. Manning
North Kildonan (RM)	1924	H. C. Whellams
Old Kildonan (RM)	1921	Charles A. Tanner
St. Boniface (RM, town, city)	1880 (RM); 1883 (town); 1908 (city)	Roger Marion and Joseph Joyal (RM); T. A. Bernier (town); J. Alfred Bleau (city)
St. James (RM, city)	1921 (RM); 1956 (City of St. James; later St. James-Assiniboia)	J. W. Godkin (RM); T. D. Findlay (City of St. James)
St. Vital (RM, city)	1909 (RM); 1962 (city)	Pierre Dumas (RM); H. Collins (city)
Transcona (town, city)	1912; 1961	Colin J. E. Maxwell (town); T. F. Copeland (city)
Tuxedo (town)	1913	Frederick William Heubach
West Kildonan (RM, town, city)	1914 (RM); 1921 (town); 1961 (city)	Edmund Partridge (RM); C. N. Cushner (city)

== Organizations under Council ==
=== Committees ===
Section 63(1) of The City of Winnipeg Charter allows Winnipeg City Council the authority to establish committees of Council. Through by-law, Council is able to delegate powers, duties, or functions to a committee. Committees include standing committees and community committees.

The first Winnipeg City Council established standing committees on finance, printing, board of works, markets, fire & water, and assessment. Council subsequently began to establish itself through the passage of by-laws, with 27 by-laws being passed in the city’s first year of incorporation.

Each of the 15 Councillors represents a ward within Winnipeg, with three wards composing a Community Committee. The five Community Committees of the 2018-2022 period are

- City Centre Community Committee — Daniel McIntyre Ward, River Heights–Fort Garry Ward, and Fort-Rouge–East Fort Garry Ward
- Assiniboia Community Committee — St. James Ward, Charleswood–Tuxedo Ward, and Waverley West
- Lord Selkirk-West Kildonan Community Committee — Mynarski Ward, Point Douglas Ward, and Old Kildonan Ward
- East Kildonan-Transcona Community Committee — North Kildonan Ward, Transcona Ward, and Elmwood-East Kildonan Ward
- Riel Community Committee — St. Boniface Ward, St. Norbert–Seine River Ward, and St. Vital Ward

The Winnipeg City Council has established six standing policy committees for the period of 1 November 2020 to 31 October 2021, some having ad-hoc committees of their own:

- on Infrastructure Renewal and Public Works
- on Innovation and Economic Development
- on Finance
- on Property and Development, Heritage and Downtown Development
- on Protection, Community Services and Parks
  - Ad Hoc Committee on Non-Essential Pesticide Reduction
- on Water and Waste, Riverbank Management and the Environment

In addition, the Executive Policy Committee is composed of Mayor Brian Bowman (Chairperson) and Councillors Matt Allard, Jeff Browaty, Scott Gillingham, Cindy Gilroy, Brian Mayes, and Sherri Rollins. This Committee also includes the Ad Hoc Committee on Development Standards.

=== Boards and commissions ===
Responsibility over the management and administration of certain public services have been delegated by Winnipeg City Council to autonomous organizations (boards and commissions). These boards and commissions are appointed, wholly or partly, by Council and are granted authority either by the relevant Council by-laws or by Act of the Manitoba Legislature. A majority of these boards and commissions are composed of members of the public, as well as members of Council.

As of 2021, the following are the existing boards and commissions of Council:

- Assiniboine Park Conservancy Inc.
- Association of Manitoba Municipalities Inc
- Association of Manitoba Bilingual Municipalities
- Board of Adjustment
- Board of Appeal (Local Improvement Assessment Appeals)
- Board of Revision
- Canadian Capital Cities
- Centreport Canada
- Centreventure Development Corporation
- City Council Benefits Board
- Community Emergency Advisory Committee
- Concordia Hospital Board of Directors
- Convention Centre Corporation
- Economic Development Winnipeg Inc.
- EdgeCorp Joint Venture Agreement
- Federation of Canadian Municipalities
- Fire Fighters Museum
- Francophone and Francophile Cities Network
- French Language Services Liaison
- The Forks North Portage Partnership
- General Council of Winnipeg Community Centres (GCWCC) Board of Directors
- Governance Committee of Council
- Heritage Winnipeg Corporation
- Historical Buildings and Resources Committee
- Human Rights Committee of Council
- Library Advisory Committees
- Records Committee
- River Park South Joint Venture Agreement
- Ross House Museum
- Red River Basin Commission
- St. Boniface Museum Board
- St. James-Assiniboia Museum Board
- Grant’s Old Mill (St. James-Assiniboia Pioneer Association Inc.)
- Seven Oaks House Museum Board
- Take Pride Winnipeg
- Transcona Historical Museum Board
- Transcona West Joint Venture Agreement
- Transit Advisory Committee
- Urban Design Advisory Committee
- Vehicle for Hire Appeal Board
- Winnipeg Airports Authority Board
- Winnipeg Art Gallery Board of Governors
- Winnipeg Arts Council Inc.
- Winnipeg Building Commission
- Winnipeg Committee For Safety
- Winnipeg Enterprises Corporation
- Winnipeg Food Council
- Winnipeg Housing Rehabilitation Corporation
- Winnipeg Housing Steering Committee
- Winnipeg Metropolitan Region
- Winnipeg Police Board
- Winnipeg Police Pension Board
- Winnipeg Public Library Board
