= Amalgamation of Winnipeg =

Merger of the City of Winnipeg with other municipalities in 1972

The City of Winnipeg Act
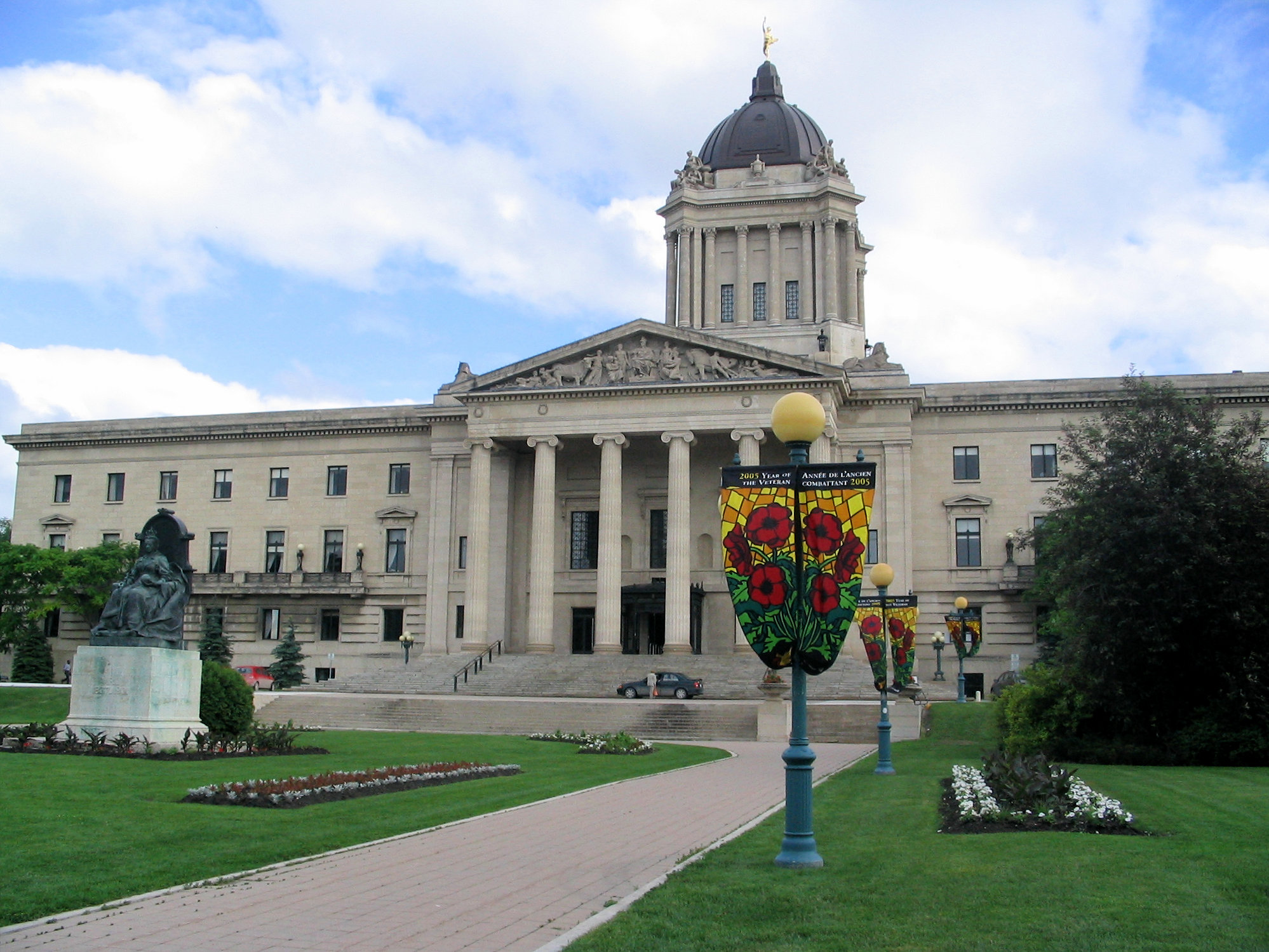

Legislative Assembly of Manitoba
- Long title: The City of Winnipeg Act creating Unicity
- Citation: S.M. 1971, c. 105
- Royal assent: July 27, 1971

Legislative history
- Bill title: Bill 36

Amended by
- City of Winnipeg Charter, S.M. 2002, c. 39
- Status: Amended

Map of Winnipeg showing its 12 predecessor municipalities

The amalgamation of Winnipeg, Manitoba (also known as Unicity) was the municipal incorporation of the old City of Winnipeg, eleven surrounding municipalities, and the Metropolitan Corporation of Greater Winnipeg (Metro) into one.

The amalgamated city's boundaries were established by the 1971 City of Winnipeg Act, combining the former Winnipeg and Metro with the rural municipalities of Charleswood, Fort Garry, North Kildonan, and Old Kildonan; the Town of Tuxedo; and the cities of East Kildonan, West Kildonan, St. Vital, Transcona, St. Boniface, and St. James-Assiniboia. The city-metropolitan government officially replaced the existing municipal governments on 1 January 1972.

Though officially joined in 1972, these areas and their respective civic services (e.g. police departments) were not completely merged until years later.

== Background ==
The creation of a 'unicity' has been recognized as an ambitious experiment and unique innovation in metropolitan government reform.

In 1955, the provincial government of Manitoba created the Greater Winnipeg Investigating Commission to look into inter-municipal issues in the Greater Winnipeg Area. The Commission took four years and concluded with the recommendation that a strong central government be formed. With this, the Metropolitan Corporation of Greater Winnipeg (Metro Winnipeg) was incorporated in 1960.

From its creation until 1971, the Metro Winnipeg administrative system comprised Winnipeg and 12 other municipalities under a single metropolitan government, in a "two-tier" system in which councillors were elected through single transferable vote. In this framework, each municipality managed their own affairs, levied their own taxes, and took responsibility for local roads, water, and parks. On top of this, however, an additional metropolitan level of government existed as well, holding responsibility for planning major roads, major parks, and major water and sewer systems. The Unicity model thus sought to make such matters more efficient and coordinated, by centralizing service delivery and administration while equalizing property taxes and decentralizing the political process.

The Unicity reforms were originally proposed by the Manitoba New Democratic Party (NDP) government, led by Edward Schreyer, elected in 1969. That year, Saul Cherniack was appointed as the Minister responsible for the amalgamation, in addition to becoming the Minister of Finance. James Currie Gilmour was also a supervisor of the Unicity project. The coordination of policy and administration was to be facilitated by the close cooperation of a Board of Commissioners, who would act as the senior officers of the city's civil service, and the 50-member City Council with its 3 standing committees (Finance, Environment, and Works and Operations). In order to deliver services at the local level, the city was to be divided into 13 community committee areas. The community committee would be composed of the City Councillors within the given community's boundaries, and each committee was to be advised by a "Resident’s Advisory Group."

The goals of the NDP included greater citizen participation in government, "financial equity, the elimination of conflict and stalemate between the Metro and municipal levels, greater efficiency in the delivery of services, and a greater degree of involvement by the public at large in local politics." However, the unicity reforms as actually enacted were far from those laid out in the NDP's original December 1970 white paper on the subject ("Proposals for Urban Reorganization in the Greater Winnipeg Area").

Then-Mayor of Winnipeg Stephen Juba played an integral role in the amalgamation project. He actively opposed the idea of having a cabinet government—wherein the Mayor would be elected from Council rather than by the residents of Winnipeg—that was intended for Unicity. Juba argued for direct election, a view that proved to be popular, and pushed the continuation of the office of the mayor as a strong executive that is independent of the City Council.

== Amalgamation ==
The 1971 City of Winnipeg Act, which established the city's boundaries and defined its neighbourhoods, incorporated the City of Winnipeg (1874–1971); the rural municipalities of Charleswood, Fort Garry, North Kildonan, and Old Kildonan; the Town of Tuxedo; the cities of East Kildonan, West Kildonan, St. Vital, Transcona, St. Boniface, and St. James-Assiniboia; and the Metropolitan Corporation of Greater Winnipeg into one city, commonly referred to as unicity.

The Act also guaranteed bilingual services in some parts of St. Boniface and St. Vital, as well as in certain City of Winnipeg offices. Donald Ian MacDonald became the first Chief Commissioner of the new City of Winnipeg in 1971.

The unicity system replaced the two-tier metropolitan system with first-past-the-post voting. The election of the first Winnipeg City Council was held on 6 October 1971 and the new City came into legal existence on 1 January 1972. Beginning in 1972, the new unified Council consisted of 50 councillors, one elected from each of the city's 50 wards, and a mayor, elected by voters in the city-at-large. The inaugural meeting of the new City Council subsequently took place in the Council Chamber of the Winnipeg Civic Centre on 4 January 1972.

Though officially joined in 1972, the total amalgamation of all areas and their respective civic departments (e.g. police) was not completed until years later, taking place in stages after considerable research and consultation. The Unicity-area Fire Departments, for instance, amalgamated in January 1974. The Winnipeg ambulance service subsequently formed in 1975. The scale of this operation was due to the fact that each former municipality had its own civil service with its own seniority lists, pension plans, benefits, classification systems, and collective agreements with employees.

=== Police forces ===
Not all functions within the new city joined together immediately. Though officially joined in 1972, the total amalgamation of all areas and their respective civic departments was not completed until 1974. The various Police Departments continued working as independent forces, each still maintaining their own radio system, stations, and distinct uniforms. In case of an emergency, they would use a Civil Defence radio network to connect all of the departments. The change that would occur in 1972 was that the existing forces would be combined into 8 community districts.

The North Kildonan Police Force (who had 18 members) left their building on 1400 Henderson Highway to move in with the East Kildonan Police Department (39 members) at 545 Watt Street. The Old Kildonan Police Force (7 member) similarly moved out of their location at McPhillips/Jefferson to work at 260 Hartford Avenue, the station of the West Kildonan Police Department (22 members). On 1 October 1972, the Tuxedo Police Force (5 members) joined the Winnipeg Police Department (WPD; 528 members) in Winnipeg Inner City; thereafter, the former Tuxedo Police Station at 2020 Corydon Avenue would be used as an ancillary office. Winnipeg also overtook responsibility for the RM of Charleswood, whose contract with the RCMP had expired. The remaining police forces at this time were those of Winnipeg, Fort Garry, St. Boniface, St. James-Assiniboia, St. Vital, and Transcona—each of whom continued working out of their own stations and wearing their respective shoulder flashes.

By 1973, the WPD continued to increase in size with the expanding workload, consisting of 493 officers and 141 staff. The early years of amalgamation also saw the creation of various specialty units within the Winnipeg Police, in addition to the canine unit which began in 1972. For instance, an underwater recovery unit existed in the Fort Garry Police Department and was enlarged; a letter bomb explosion in Winnipeg inspired the establishment of a bomb disposal unit; the possibilities of large public disorders brought on the creation of a crowd control unit; and the need for specially trained negotiators and weapons experts lead to the formation of an emergency response unit. Additionally, in order to enforce all laws within the public parks and other City-owned properties, section 661 of the new City of Winnipeg Act provided for the employment of watchmen, who had "all the authority and powers of, and [were] subject to the same liability and to the performance of the same duties as, a constable under the Provincial Police Act."

The final amalgamation of the individual police forces took place on 21 October 1974, when the 8 remaining departments merged into the unified City of Winnipeg Police Department, commanded by Chief of Police Norman M. Stewart.

Six separate districts would be formed based on geography, as St. Vital Police joined St. Boniface to become District #5 and East Kildonan Police joined Transcona to become District #4. The other districts became:

- District #1 was the former Winnipeg Inner City Police in the downtown area
- District #2, the former St.James-Assiniboia Police to the west
- District #3, to the north, was the former West Kildonan Police
- District #6, to the south, was made up from the Fort Garry Police with the parts of Winnipeg Police who were now patrolling Tuxedo, Charleswood, and Headingley.

Districts of the City of Winnipeg Police Department, 21 October 1974
District	Area(s)	Station	Notes
1	fmr. Winnipeg (Inner City)	fmr. Winnipeg Police building, 151 Princess St.	
2	St. James-Assiniboia	fmr. St. James-Assiniboia Police building, 210 Lyle St.	
3	West Kildonan area	fmr. West Kildonan Police building, 260 Hartford Ave.	The area includes the fmr. Winnipeg area north of the CPR Main line tracks between Higgins and Sutherland Ave.
4	North Kildonan, East Kildonan, Transcona, and Elmwood (Winnipeg)	fmr. Transcona Station, 730 Pandora Ave.	Officers moved to this station after the East Kildonan Station at 545 Watt St. was closed.
5	St. Boniface and St. Vital	St. Boniface Station, 227 Provencher Ave.	Officers moved to this station after the St. Vital Police Station, located within the fire station at 598 St. Mary's Road, was closed.
6	Fort Garry, including Tuxedo, Charleswood, and Fort Rouge (Winnipeg)	Fort Garry Police building, 1350 Pembina Hwy	

When this final amalgamation took place, the force nearly doubled with the authorized strength of 1975 at 921 officers and 171 staff—excluding 35 Commissionaires for parking patrol. Effective January 1975, all officers were required to be wearing the new Winnipeg Police Department shoulder flashes, "One With The Strength of Many", thereby completing the transition to a new force.

=== Fire departments ===
The fire departments of the Unicity-area amalgamated in January 1974 to become the City of Winnipeg Unified Fire Department.

Upon the formation of Unicity in 1972, changes to Winnipeg's fire stations included:

- Fire Hall #8 (325 Talbot Ave) became an ambulance depot.
- Fire Hall #12 (1055 Dorchester Ave) was closed.
- Fire Hall #15 (524 Osborne St) was initially closed, but converted into an ambulance station between 1975 and 1978 and re-designated as Ambulance Station #10.

Further changes occurred for fire departments upon their official amalgamation in 1974, primarily the renumbering of various fire stations:

- Fire Hall #7 (349 Burrows Ave) became #6.
- Fire Hall #11 (180 Sinclair St) became #7.
- Fire Hall #17 (1710 Grosvenor) became #12.
- St. James Fire Hall (200 Berry St) became Winnipeg Fire Hall #11.
- St. Boniface Fire Hall #3 (864 Marion St) became Winnipeg Fire Hall #9.
- Transcona Public Safety Building (730 Pandora Ave. West) became Winnipeg Fire Hall #21.

=== Other civic service ===
Following the formation of Unicity, various civic features of the former municipalities were changed, including:

- East Kildonan City Hall (755 Henderson Hwy) became the city's East Kildonan – Transcona Community Office.
- Public libraries of the former municipalities joined the Winnipeg Public Library (WPL) system:
  - St. Boniface Public Library Provencher Branch (255 Avenue de la Cathedrale) became the WPL Provencher Park Branch
  - St. Boniface Public Library Norwood Branch (120 Eugenie St) became the WPL Coronation Park Branch.
  - Transcona Public Library (111 Victoria Ave. West) became the WPL Transcona Branch.
- The Winnipeg Incinerator (Henry Ave) was renamed the Maude Street Incinerator to differentiate from other facilities.

In 1971, 6 former municipalities had their own parks & recreation boards or recreation commissions: East Kildonan, Fort Garry, St. Boniface, St. James-Assiniboia, St. Vital, and West Kildonan. The other 6 (including the City of Winnipeg) had run their parks & recreation programs through a council committee. Winnipeg's former Metropolitan Parks and Protection Division would provide the basis for the central administration for the new, unified Parks and Recreation Department.

== Aftermath ==
To review the City of Winnipeg Act, a provincial Committee of Review (the "Taraska" Commission) was appointed in 1975, chaired by Peter Stanley Taraska. The Committee found numerous problems in the political structure of the unicity, attributing such to the failure of the provincial government to fully implement the ideas of the original architects of the unicity plan. In 1976, the Commission recommended a parliamentary system for Unicity.

Insofar as it did not achieve many of its lofty goals, the Unicity amalgamation has been widely regarded as a failure. However, it did have some success in equalizing property tax rates across the city, eliminating the suburban "property tax havens" that had coupled low tax rates with a high level of services provided by the city at the cost of higher tax rates overall.

In 1984, the provincial government appointed a City of Winnipeg Act Review Committee, chaired by former City Councillor Lawrie Cherniack. In 1986, the Committee released the Cherniack Report, concluding that "the unicity structure, with its many suburban councillors and large tax base, facilitated the building of suburban infrastructure, to the detriment of inner-city investment." This may have been inevitable, since the incorporation of so many large suburban areas into a unicity naturally increased the political clout of the suburbs at the expense of the old City of Winnipeg.

=== Developments since ===
Initially following the amalgamation, Winnipeg City Council consisted of 50 councillors (and the mayor). The council was reduced to 29 councillors in 1980; and to 15 councillors in 1992. These reductions have garnered pushback: according to the Canadian Union of Public Employees Local 500, "One of the cornerstones of Unicity was the assurance to all citizens that amalgamation would not reduce resident involvement in civic politics."

On 7 October 1992, the City of Winnipeg Act was amended, as per the recommendation of the Winnipeg Wards Boundaries Commission, in order to provide for the definition and recognition of 5 Community Committee areas comprising a total of 15 wards. Later that year, on December 31, Headingley seceded from the City of Winnipeg.

On 29 October 1997, the City of Winnipeg Act was again amended, providing for a 4-term of office for Mayors and City Councillors, as well as replacing the Board of Commissioners with a chief administrative officer model. Six years later, on 1 January 2003, the Act was amended yet again, this time being replaced by the City of Winnipeg Charter.

== See also ==
- Law, government, and crime in Winnipeg
- List of municipalities in Manitoba
- 1971 Winnipeg municipal election
- Manitoba municipal amalgamations, 2015
- Politics of Manitoba
- Political culture of Canada
- Subdivisions of Winnipeg
- Unicity Mall
