= East Kildonan =

Suburban neighbourhood in Winnipeg, Manitoba, Canada

Coordinates: 49°55′20″N 97°06′02″W

- Suburb
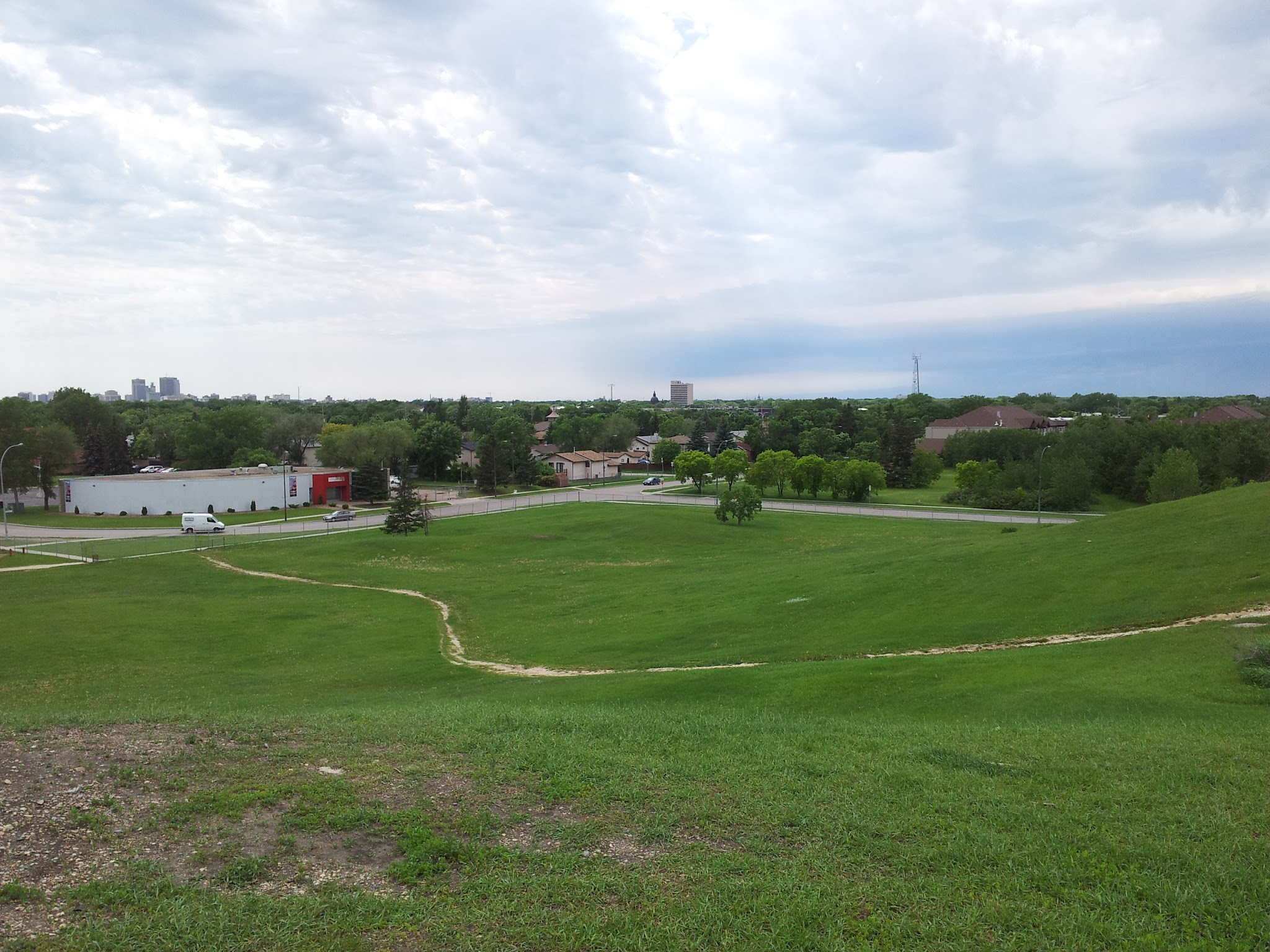
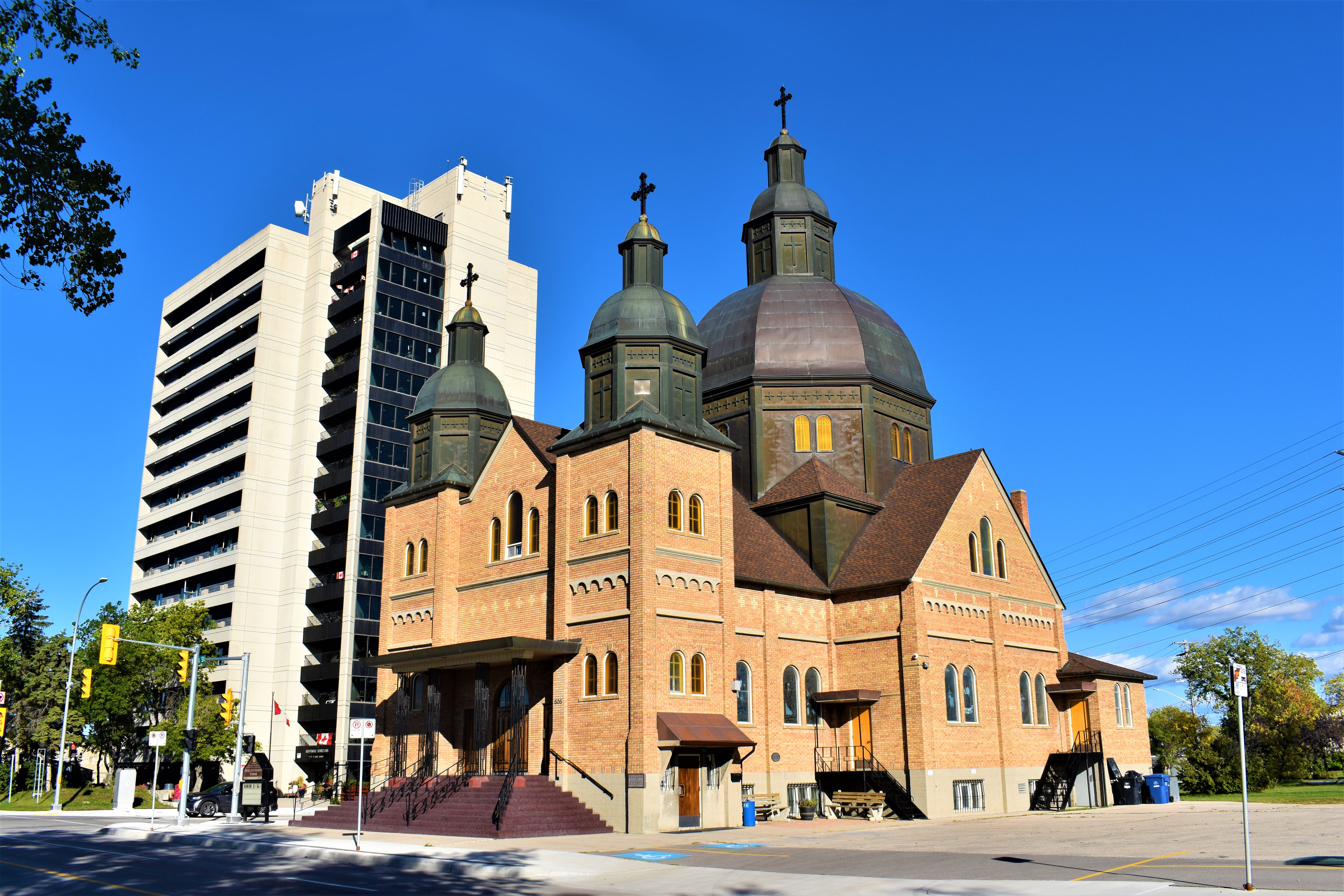
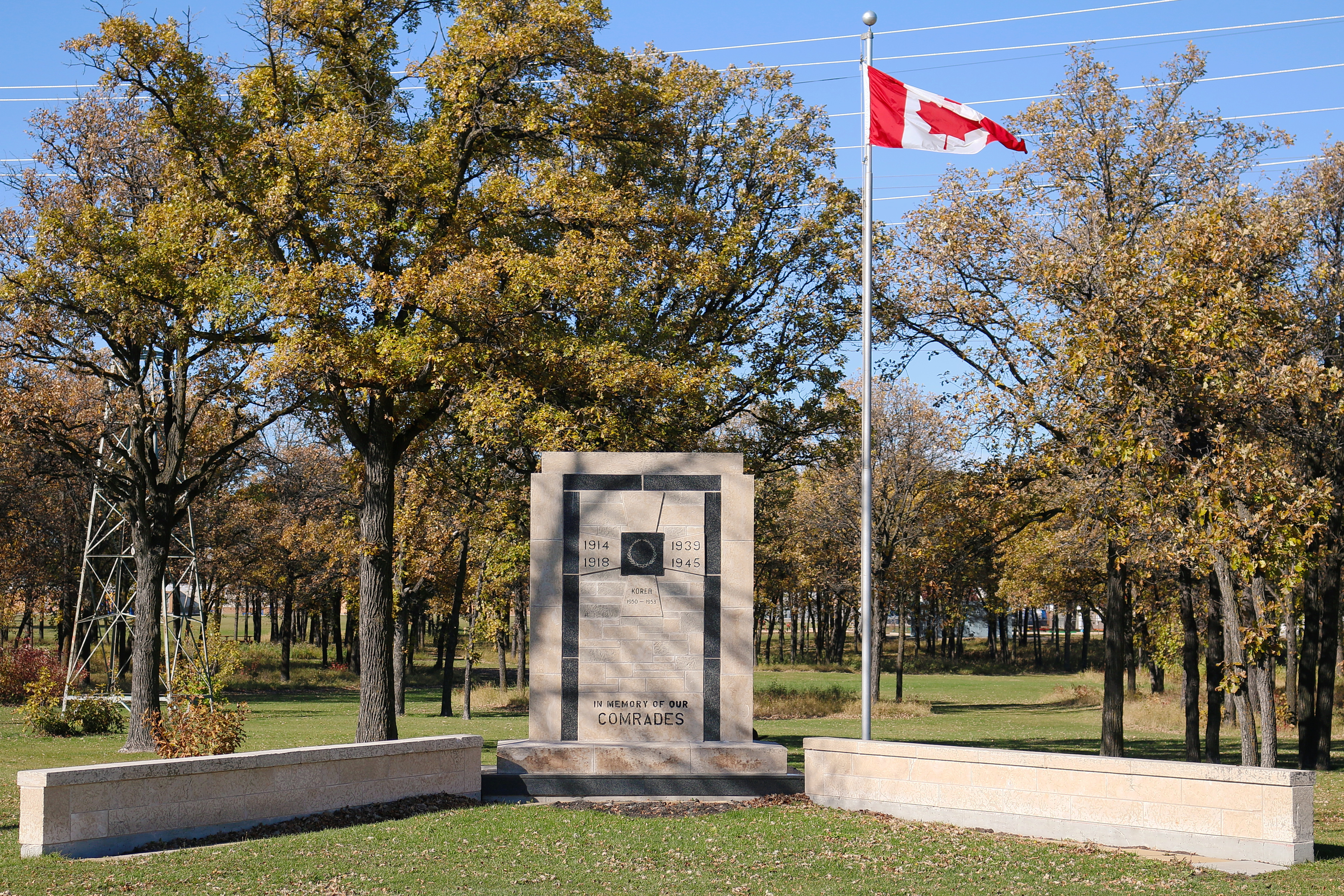

- Location within Manitoba
- Country: Canada
- Province: Manitoba
- City: Winnipeg
- Established: 1914
- Incorporated as a City: July 1, 1957; 69 years ago
- Named for: Kildonan, Arran

Government
  - MP: Colin Reynolds (Elmwood—Transcona)
  - MLAs: Tracy Schmidt (Rossmere); Matt Wiebe (Concordia)
  - City Councillor: Emma Durand-Wood (Elmwood-East Kildonan Ward)

Area
  - Suburb: 12.9 km^{2} (5.0 sq mi)
  - Metro: 5,306.79 km^{2} (2,048.96 sq mi)
- Elevation: 231 m (758 ft)

Population (2016)
  - Suburb: 35,800
  - Density: 2,780/km^{2} (7,190/sq mi)
  - Metro: 778,489
- Time zone: Central Standard Time
  - Summer (DST): Central Daylight Time
- Area codes: 204, 431

East Kildonan is a primarily residential community in northeast Winnipeg, Manitoba, Canada. Commonly known by its initials EK, the suburb has a population of approximately 35,800 as of the 2016 Census.

East Kildonan is bounded from the Red River on the west, to Panet Road, 100 metres (330 ft) north of Blantyre Avenue, and the Canadian Pacific Railway Marconi tracks (removed in 2006) on the east; and the lane between Larsen and Harbison Avenues on the south, to Oakland Avenue on the north.

It is mainly a working- and middle-class community, though there are poorer pockets south of Munroe Avenue and more affluent areas along the Red River and west of Henderson Highway, East Kildonan's major thoroughfare. There is a small industrial area located between Watt Street and the CPR tracks.

East Kildonan is considered part of the western half of the River East community area. It is made up of the neighbourhoods of Munroe, Morse Place, Rossmere, and Fraser's Grove.

== History ==
Federal census population history of East Klidonan
Year	Pop.	±%
1906	569	—
1911	1,488	+161.5%
1916	4,828	+224.5%
1921	6,379	+32.1%
1926	7,396	+15.9%
1931	9,047	+22.3%
1936	8,573	−5.2%
1941	8,350	−2.6%
1946	9,071	+8.6%
1951	13,144	+44.9%
1956	18,718	+42.4%
1961	27,305	+45.9%
1966	28,796	+5.5%
1971	30,152	+4.7%
Source: Statistics Canada

The name "Kildonan" originates from the Parish of Kildonan which was created in 1817. At the time, parishes formed both a land use system and a system of local government. The Parish of Kildonan formed part of the Red River Colony, and was named for the Strath of Kildonan on the Sutherland estate in Scotland where many of the settlers came from.

The Municipality of Kildonan was established in 1876. From 1876 to 1914 the Rural Municipality of Kildonan included a large area on both sides of the Red River, just north of the original City of Winnipeg. The area remained primarily agricultural until the beginning of the 20th century. It was a centre for market gardening to serve the needs of nearby Winnipeg. In 1903 streetcar service was initiated in the area and this began the area's development as a residential suburb of Winnipeg. In 1906 the more heavily developed southern area of the municipality, known as Elmwood, joined with the City of Winnipeg.

In 1914 Kildonan was divided in two: East and West Kildonan, with the Red River as the boundary. Subsequently, in 1925, the areas north of Oakland Avenue separated to form the Municipality of North Kildonan. East Kildonan developed rapidly after World War II, the population grew from 8,439 in 1941 to 30,150 in 1971.

With a population of 20,000, the area was finally incorporated as the City of East Kildonan on 1 July 1957 (Dominion Day), making it the fourth city in the area—following Winnipeg, St. Boniface and St. James—and the sixth largest city in Manitoba. East Kildonan initially wanted its title to be the City of Kildonan, but Old, North, and West Kildonan all vehemently objected.

East Kildonan saw a housing boom in the mid 1950s, leading to the development of roads, sewers, and schools. In 1959, the opening of the Disraeli Freeway further accelerated the growth of the area.

Map showing the former boundaries of the City of East Kildonan.

In 1972, East Kildonan, along with the old City of Winnipeg and eleven other municipalities in the Greater Winnipeg Area, amalgamated to form the City of Winnipeg. It was the only suburban municipality to be in favour of the "unicity" scheme.

Reeves and Mayors of the City of East Kildonan
Term	Reeve / Mayor
1914-1917	Donald Munroe (1854-1924)
1918-1923	Samuel Robert Henderson (1863-1928)
1924-1928	Nicholas "Nick" Fletcher (1888-1981)
1929-1933	David Jeffery Allan (1887-1956)
1934-1947	Walter Peter Larsen (1897-1962)
1948-1955	John Leslie Bodie (1909-1997)
1956	Francis William "Frank" Dryden (1903-1963)
1956-1965	George Nordland Suttie (1901-1968)
1966	Michael Spack (1922-2011)
1966-1967	George Nordland Suttie (1901-1968)
1968-1969	Michael Ruta
1970-1971	Stanley Dowhan (1927-1993)

== Geography ==
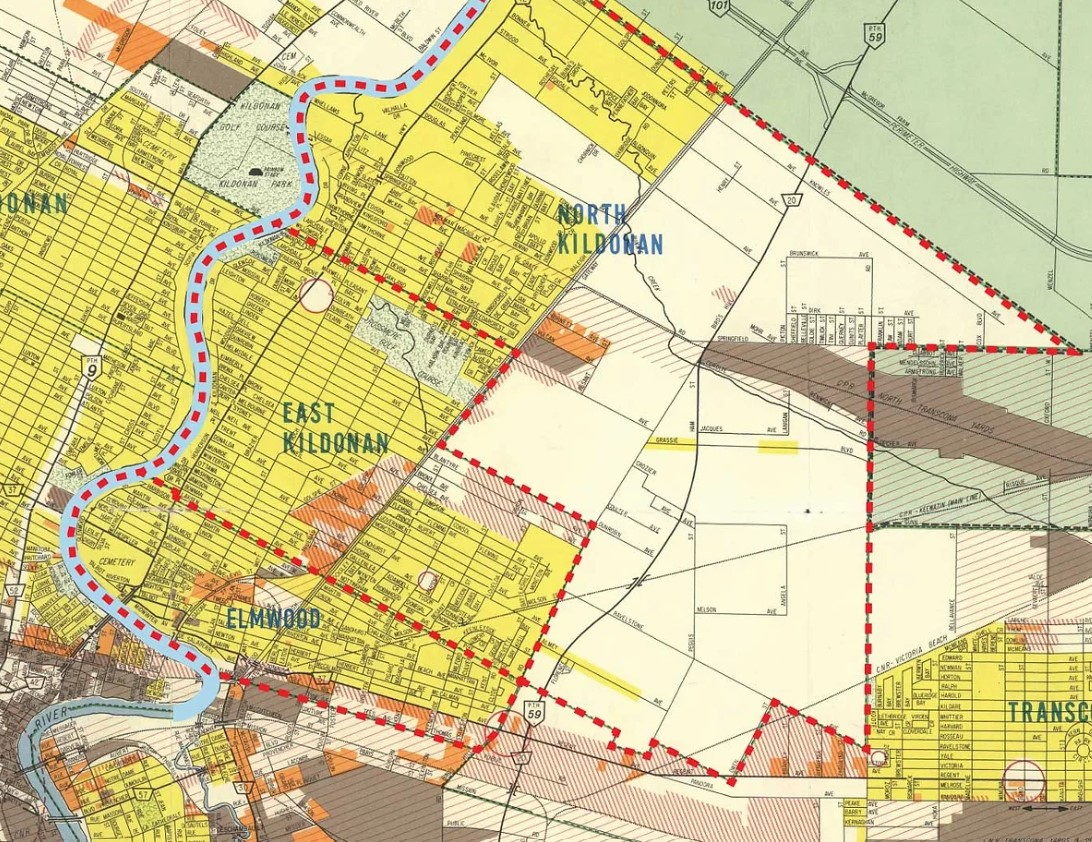
An old map of Winnipeg outlining the neighbourhood boundaries of East Kildonan and area.

East Kildonan is bounded from the Red River on the west, to Panet Road, 100 metres (330 ft) north of Blantyre Avenue, and the Canadian Pacific Railway Marconi tracks (removed in 2006) on the east; and the lane between Larsen and Harbison Avenues on the south, to Oakland Avenue on the north.

Its major thoroughfare is Henderson Highway, located on the west. The area also houses Concordia Hospital.

=== Neighbourhoods ===
East Kildonan is considered part of the western half of the River East community area. It is made up of such neighbourhoods as Munroe, Morse Place, Rossmere, and Fraser's Grove.

2016 census pop. of East Kildonan
	Pop.	Area sq. km.
Munroe West	3,010	1.3
Rossmere A	13,330	4.0
Rossmere B	4,185	1.2
River East	7,725	3.4
Kildonan Drive	4,695	2.3
Valhalla	2,855	0.7
TOTAL	35,800	12.9

==== Crime rates ====
The table below shows the crime rates of various crimes in each of the East Kildonan neighbourhoods. The crime data spans 5 years from the year 2017 to the year 2021. The rates are crimes per 100,000 residents per year.

Crime Rates per 100,000 people in East Kildonan Neighbourhoods, 2017-2021
Neighbourhood	Pop.	Homicide	Rate (Note: Rate per 100,000 people per year: Figure is calculated by dividing the total incidences of a crime by the neighbourhood population, then multiplying by 100,000, and then dividing by 5, as the data spans 5 years)	Robbery	Rate	Agr. Aslt. (Note: Aggravated assault: Includes assaults which cause bodily harm or utilize weapons; includes the following categories given on Winnipeg CrimeMaps: aggravated assault, aggravated sexual assault, assault against peace officer, assault with weapon or causing bodily harm, attempted murder, firearms offences, sexual assault with a weapon.)	Rate	Cmn. Aslt (Note: Common assault: Excludes assaults which cause bodily harm or utilize weapons; includes the following categories given on Winnipeg CrimeMaps: assault against peace officer, common assault, other assaults, sexual assault.)	Rate	Utt. Threat (Note: Abbreviated from: uttering threats)	Rate	Property	Rate
Eaglemere	1,560	0	0.0	6	76.9	4	51.3	20	256.4	8	102.6	206	2641.0
Grassie	5,120	0	0.0	2	7.8	17	66.4	29	113.3	17	66.4	365	1425.8
Kildonan Crossing	0	1	--	22	--	11	--	37	--	15	--	446	--
Kildonan Drive	4,695	0	0	42	178.9	21	89.5	48	204.5	34	144.8	929	3957.4
Munroe East	8,500	1	2.4	39	91.8	96	225.9	185	435.3	47	110.6	1514	3562.4
Munroe West	3,010	0	0	32	212.6	20	132.9	58	385.4	18	119.6	857	5694.4
Rossmere-B	4,185	0	0	23	109.9	15	71.7	43	205.5	16	76.5	611	2920.0
Valley Gardens	8,430	1	2.4	55	130.5	72	170.8	135	320.3	46	109.1	1694	4019.0
East Kildonan	35,500	3	1.7	221	124.5	256	144.2	555	312.7	201	113.2	6622	3730.7

== Notable people ==
- Matt Wiebe (1979–), politician and member of the Legislative Assembly of Manitoba
