= Mulvoy =

Mulvoy is a surname. Notable people with the surname include:

- Ana Mulvoy-Ten (born 1992), English actress
- Mark Mulvoy (born 1941), American sports journalist and writer
- Terry Mulvoy (1938–2020), English footballer

== See also ==
- Mulvey
