= Larry Fleisher (Canadian football) =

Canadian football player (born 1935)

Profile
- Positions: Guard, Linebacker

Personal information
- Born: 1934 or 1935 (age 91–92); Winnipeg, Manitoba, Canada
- Listed height: 5 ft 8 in (1.73 m)
- Listed weight: 215 lb (98 kg)

Career information
- College: Wake Forest

Career history
- 1960: Winnipeg Blue Bombers
- 1960–1963: Edmonton Eskimos

Larry Fleisher (born 1935) is a Canadian football player who played for the Winnipeg Blue Bombers and Edmonton Eskimos. He previously played football at Wake Forest University. Fleisher later served as a city councillor for Winnipeg City Council.
