= Mulvey =

Mulvey may refer to:

== People ==
- Anthony Mulvey (1882–1957), Irish politician
- Callan Mulvey (born 1975), New Zealand-born Australian actor
- Dearie Mulvey (1898–1968), American co-owner of the Dodgers baseball club, wife of James
- Frank Mulvey (1918–81), Canadian football player
- Gráinne Mulvey (born 1966), Irish composer
- Grant Mulvey (born 1956), Canadian ice hockey player
- Harold M. Mulvey (1914–2000), American lawyer and politician
- James Mulvey (1899–1973), American co-owner of the Dodgers baseball club, husband of Dearie
- James Mulvey, English drug smuggler
- Joe Mulvey (1858–1928), American baseball player
- Kevin Mulvey (born 1985), American baseball player
- Laura Mulvey (born 1941), British feminist film theorist
- Logan Mulvey (born 1984), American businessman
- Lorcan Mulvey (born before 2002), Irish Gaelic footballer
- Michael Mulvey (born 1968), American photographer
- Mike Mulvey (born 1963), English football manager
- Nick Mulvey (born 1984), English musician, singer and songwriter
- Paul Mulvey (born 1958), Canadian ice hockey player
- Peter Mulvey (born 1969), American folk singer-songwriter
- Robert Mulvey (1868–1937), Australian trade unionist and politician
- Sarah Mulvey (1974–2010), British commissioning editor and television producer
- Sinéad Mulvey (born 1988), Irish singer
- Stewart Mulvey (1834–1908), Canadian teacher, newspaper editor, militia officer, and politician
- Suzanne Mulvey (born 1984), Scottish footballer
- William Mulvey (born 1949), American Catholic prelate

== Places ==
- Mulvey, Louisiana, an unincorporated community in Vermilion Parish
- Mulvey Park, a city council estate in Windy Arbour, Dundrum, Dublin, Ireland
