= Michael Mulvey =

Michael Mulvey may refer to:

- Michael Mulvey (photographer), American photographer
- Michael Mulvey (bishop), American bishop
- Mike Mulvey, Australian-English footballer
