= Metropolitan Corporation of Greater Winnipeg =

Former second tier municipal government

Metropolitan government overview
- Formed: January 1, 1961; 65 years ago
- Dissolved: December 31, 1971; 54 years ago
- Jurisdiction: Greater Winnipeg
- Headquarters: 100 Main St. Winnipeg, Manitoba; 49°53′16.3″N 97°08′5.8″W

Metropolitan Corporation of Greater Winnipeg was a governing body that served as part of the leadership for the metropolitan area of Winnipeg. It was established by Premier Douglas Campbell after he was given a commission to do so by the Greater Winnipeg Investigating Commission. It was dissolved when its component municipalities were amalgamated into one "unicity" in 1972. Winnipeg is a city in Manitoba, Canada.

== History ==
In August 1955 the Greater Winnipeg Investigating Commission was appointed by Premier Douglas Campbell to design and recommend a metropolitan level of governance for the Greater Winnipeg area. Commission members included Mayor George Sharpe of Winnipeg, Mayor J. G. Belleghem of St. Boniface, Mayor Thomas Findlay of St. James, Councillor C. N. Kushner of West Kildonan, and J. L. Bodie, former mayor of East Kildonan. Their report was released at the end of March 1959.

When implemented, it was the third form of metropolitan government instituted on the North American continent after Toronto (1954) and Dade County, Florida (1957).

The original name for the governing entity would have been The Corporation of Metropolitan Winnipeg. However the Mayors did not like this name and had it changed in March 1960 to the Metropolitan Corporation of Greater Winnipeg.

In 1960, the Metropolitan Corporation of Greater Winnipeg was established by Manitoba's Metropolitan Winnipeg Act as a separate layer of municipal government in the metropolitan area of Winnipeg, Manitoba. Bill 62 entered Second Reading stage in February 1960.

Metro Winnipeg consisted of the City of Winnipeg and various surrounding municipalities, including Brooklands, Tuxedo, Charleswood, Transcona, West Kildonan, North Kildonan, East Kildonan, Old Kildonan, Saint Boniface, Saint Vital and Fort Garry. During the period of its existence, it provided services such as transit, parks, water and other municipal services to residents.

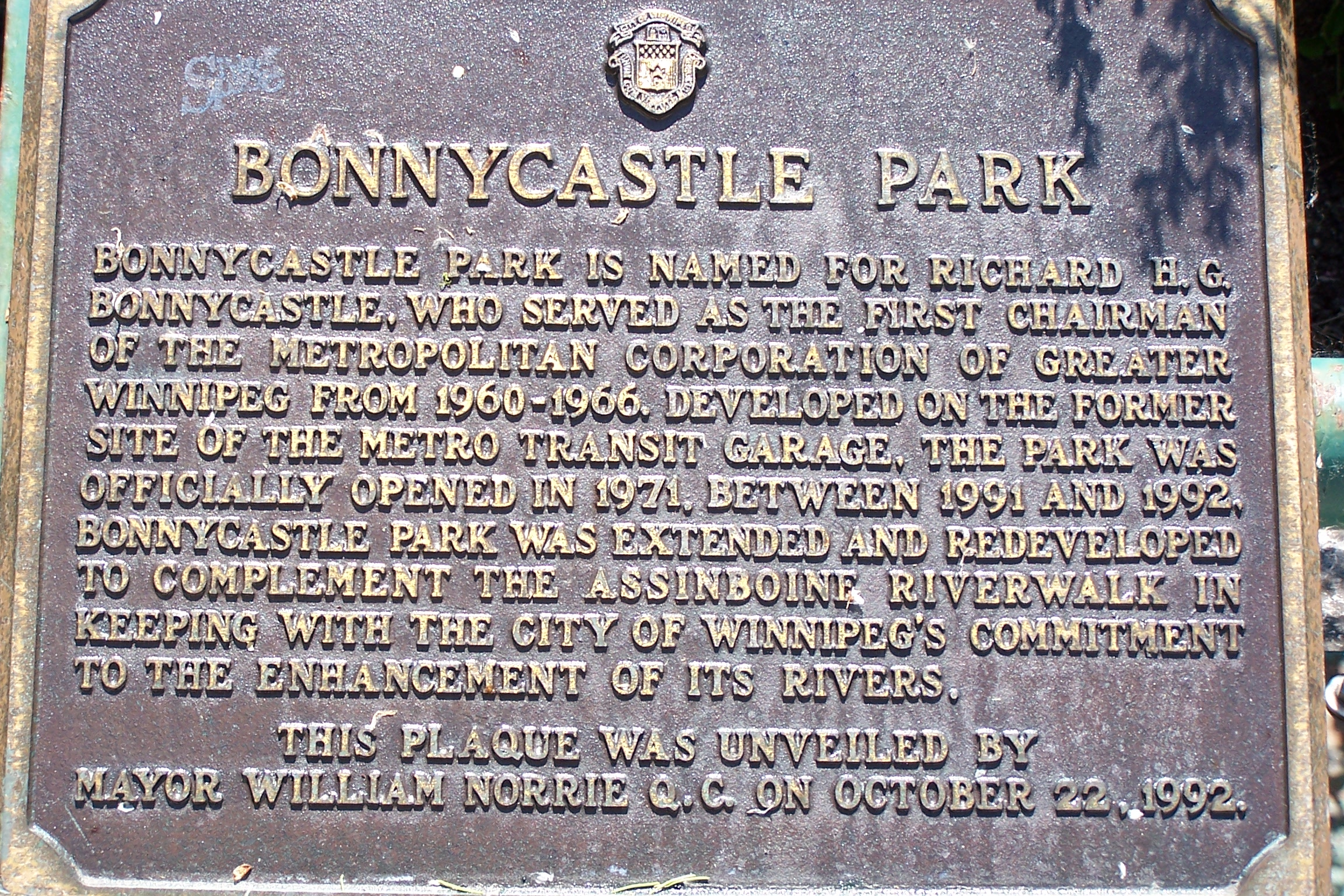
Bonnycastle Park commemorating Metro's first Chairman.

Metro government was established in November 1960 and absorbed the Greater Winnipeg Transit Commission on Jan. 1, 1961. During this time it operated under a Committees Council system, with six divisions reporting to an executive director. It ceased to exist upon the introduction of a unified municipal government (popularly known as "Unicity") by the Province of Manitoba under Premier Ed Schreyer, effective Jan. 1, 1972.

The administration offices were located at 100 Main Street. The building was the administrative headquarters of the City of Winnipeg Streets & Transportation Department until 2007-2008 when the city handed it over to the Friends of Upper Fort Garry to make way for an expanded Upper Fort Garry Heritage park.

On January 1, 1972 Metro was dissolved in favour of combining all municipalities under one city. All former City, RM, and Town Acts were repealed.

== Responsibilities ==
Metro's responsibilities included:

Planning for all major thoroughfares and bridge crossings. Operation of major and emerging parks over 15 acres (6.1 ha) in size: Assiniboine Park, Kildonan Park, St. Vital Park, Crescent Drive Park. Property assessment. Provision of water, sewage, garbage, and public transit services to metro area municipalities.

== Legacy ==
Metro Winnipeg attempted to introduce a co-ordinated approach planning between its member municipalities, and to that end it created several planning documents. Those documents included the Downtown Winnipeg Plan, the Winnipeg Area Transportation Study, and District Area Plans for the suburban municipalities of metropolitan Winnipeg. Metro Winnipeg was responsible for the operation of Metro Winnipeg Transit.

Metro was involved in the initial plans for the Winnipeg Convention Centre. Under Metro the Transit garage on Assiniboine Avenue was closed. A new and larger Metro Transit Base on Osborne St. was opened in 1969.

The route numbering system in place today was originally introduced as the Metro Route system. Testing went on during the 1960s, with final sign design and route numbering plan completed in July 1967 weeks before the start of the Pan Am Games.

== See also ==
- Winnipeg Metro Region
- Metropolitan Toronto
- Miami-Dade County, Florida
