= Frank Mulvey =

Profile
- Position: End

Personal information
- Born: 1918; Elmwood, Winnipeg, Manitoba, Canada
- Died: May 3, 1981 (aged 62–63); Winnipeg, Manitoba, Canada
- Listed height: 6 ft 1 in (1.85 m)

Career history
- c. 1939–1941: Winnipeg Blue Bombers
- 1945, 1947: Winnipeg Blue Bombers

Awards and highlights
- Grey Cup champion (1939, 1941)

Franklin Walter Mulvey (1918 – May 3, 1981) was a Canadian professional football player who played for the Winnipeg Blue Bombers. He won the Grey Cup with them in 1939 and 1941. He died in 1981.
