= Elmwood-East Kildonan Ward =

Municipal ward in Canada

Elmwood-East Kildonan
- Constituency for the Winnipeg City Council
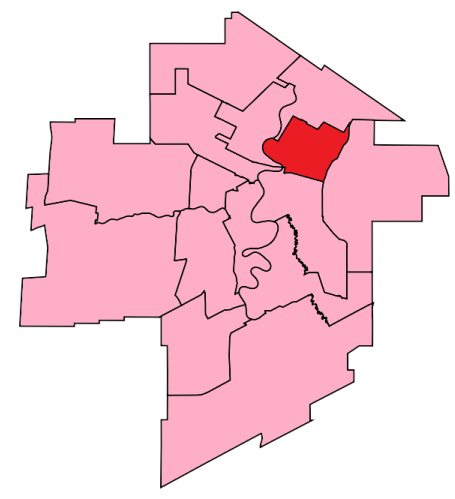
- Location of Elmwood-East Kildonan Ward in Winnipeg
- City: Winnipeg
- Population: 44,268 (2016)

Current constituency
- Created: 2002
- Councillor: Emma Durand-Wood

Elmwood-East Kildonan is a municipal ward in the north end of Winnipeg, Manitoba, Canada. It elects one member to Winnipeg City Council.

== Geography ==
The ward contains all of the Elmwood sector of the city, plus most of East Kildonan and part of North Kildonan. Specifically, the ward includes the neighbourhoods of Chalmers, Eaglemere, East Elmwood, Glenelm, Kildonan Crossing, Munroe East, Munroe West, Rossmere, Talbot-Grey, Tyne-Tees, and Valley Gardens.

== History ==
The ward was created prior to the 2002 election, when Elmwood Ward was expanded to include part of Transcona Ward.

=== Councillors ===
1. Lillian Thomas (2002–2010)
2. Thomas Steen (2010–2014)
3. Jason Schreyer (2014–2025)
4. Emma Durand-Wood (2025–present)

== Election results ==
=== 2026 ===
Council candidate	Vote	%
Emma Durand-Wood	3,681	39.29
Chris Sweryda	2,145	22.90
Abel Gutierrez	1,804	19.26
Jessica Wiebe	926	9.88
Adam Dudek	812	8.67

=== 2025 by-election ===
A by-election was held in the ward on October 25, 2025, following the death of councillor Jason Schreyer on April 29, 2025.

Emma Durand-Wood won the by-election with 1,567 votes. Abel Gutierrez placed second with 887 votes, and Braydon Mazurkiewich placed third with 842 votes.

Candidates

- Christian Sweryda, former executive assistant, masters student, road safety researcher, endorsed by the Schreyer family, including former governor general Ed Schreyer.
- Braydon Mazurkiewich, auto finance broker, campaign worker, former leader of the Manitoba Progressive Conservative Party youth wing before being expelled for racist comments. Endorsed by former Conservative MP Shelly Glover. and Transcona City Councillor Russ Wyatt.
- Emma Durand-Wood, freelance writer and editor Endorsed by former mayoral candidate Shaun Loney.
- Zekeria Selahadin, Ethiopian immigrant, childcare assistant, University of Winnipeg graduate
- Carmen Prefontaine, municipal worker, former vice president of the Canadian Union of Public Employees. Endorsed by the Winnipeg Labour Council, the United Firefighters of Winnipeg, & Mynarski City Councillor Ross Eadie.
- Abel Gutierrez, Mexican immigrant, construction senior project manager, youth football coach Endorsed by former Deputy Premier of Manitoba Eric Robinson.
- Kyle Roche, municipal worker

Results

Council candidate	Vote	%
Emma Durand-Wood	1,567	31.48
Abel Gutierrez	887	17.82
Braydon Mazurkiewich	842	16.92
Christian Sweryda	740	14.87
Carmen Prefontaine	644	12.94
Kyle Roche	230	4.62
Zekaria Selahadin	67	1.35

=== 2022 ===
Council candidate	Vote	%
Jason Schreyer	5,554	62.19
Ryan Kochie	3,376	37.81

=== 2018 ===
Council candidate	Vote	%
Jason Schreyer	6,171	54.78
Robb Massey	5,095	45.22

=== 2014 ===
Council candidate	Vote	%
Jason Schreyer	6,830	55.10
Thomas Steen	4,157	33.54
Paul Quaye	770	6.21
Jason Cumming	638	5.15

=== 2010 ===
Council candidate	Vote	%
Thomas Steen	3,921	33.72
Shaneen Robinson	3,705	31.87
Rod Giesbrecht	3,501	30.11
Gordon Warren	264	2.27
Nelson Sanderson	236	2.03

=== 2006 ===
2006 Winnipeg municipal election
Candidate	Votes	%
(x)Lillian Thomas	4,945	57.65
David J. Danyluk	1,657	19.32
Wally Roth	1,585	18.48
Isaiah Oyeleru	390	4.55
Total valid votes	8,577	100.00

=== 2002 ===
2002 Winnipeg municipal election
Candidate	Votes	%
(x)Lillian Thomas	5,971	50.25
Greg Bozyk	2,432	20.47
Ray Brunka	1,931	16.25
Bryan McLeod	1,548	13.03
Total valid votes	11,882	100.00
