= Concordia Hospital =

- Winnipeg Regional Health Authority
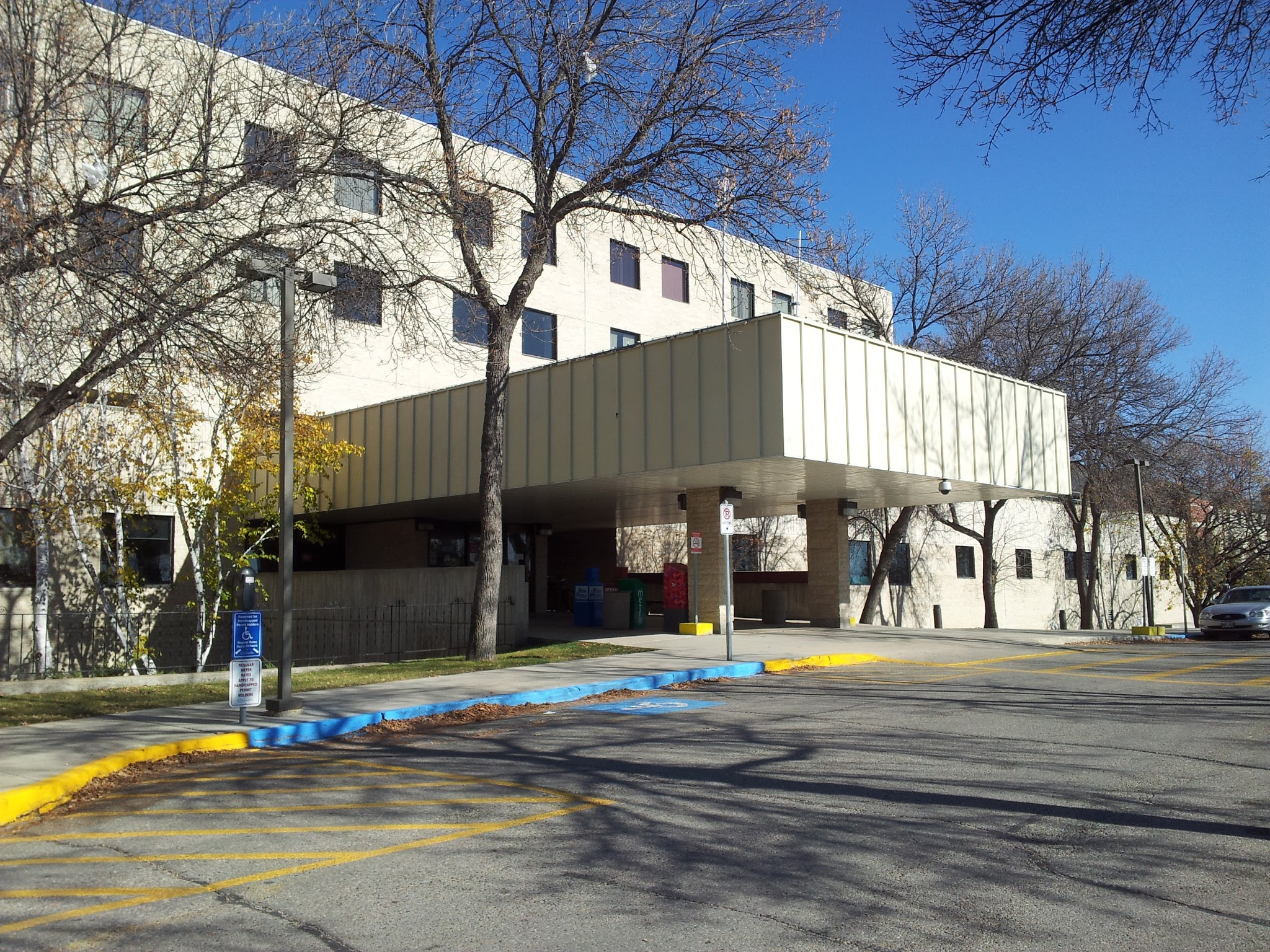
- Entrance to Concordia Hospital

Geography
- Location: 1095 Concordia Avenue; Winnipeg, Manitoba; R2K 3S8
- Coordinates: 49.9132°N 97.0646°W

Organisation
- Care system: Medicare
- Type: Regional
- Religious affiliation: Mennonite
- Affiliated university: None

Services
- Emergency department: No
- Beds: 164

History
- Former name: Mennonite Concordia Hospital
- Founded: 1928

Links
- Website: www.concordiahospital.mb.ca

Concordia Hospital is a regional hospital in Winnipeg, Manitoba that was founded in 1928, and has a primary service area with a population exceeding 150,000. The hospital's name originates from a poem entitled "Song of the Church Bell" by German poet and philosopher Friedrich Schiller. The inspirational line reads, "Concordia shall be her name; to harmony, to hearty fellowship, it summons the cherished community."

Concordia Hospital is Winnipeg's leading hip and knee surgery hospital, conducting 1,508 hip and knee surgeries during the 2011 fiscal year, more than any other Winnipeg facility. As of 2022, the hospital had 164 beds, declining from the previous years according to the Winnipeg Regional Health Authority.

== History ==
=== Machray Avenue ===
The Concordia Society was founded in 1928 as a maternity hospital in a private home on Machray Avenue in West Kildonan, by the Mennonite Hospital Society. The original facilities included five beds and the hospital had a staff of three people. The first year saw 28 mothers admitted to the hospital, and by the second year the admissions had increased to 100. In 1930, the hospital was renamed Mennonite Concordia Hospital and was operated by a Board of Directors. The hospital was officially incorporated by the Government of Manitoba on 26 March 1931. The Elmwood Sanitorium was purchased as a new site of the hospital on 13 July 1931.

=== 400 DeSalaberry Avenue ===
Concordia Hospital began operating from the 400 DeSalaberry Avenue location in Elmwood in 1933. The new hospital stood on the former location of the Elmwood Sanitorium that had been purchased two years prior. The institution was formally opened on June 17, 1934. During the first eleven months of operation at the new location, the hospital admitted 297 patients. Of these, 113 were maternity patients, 114 were surgical patients, 67 were medical and 3 were admitted for bone fractures. By 1938, the hospital had 50 beds and 12 staff.

The hospital expanded in 1953 and 1958 and in 1957, the hospital added eight cribs and eight beds to the maternity wing. In 1964, the hospital purchased the land which became the current location of the hospital. By 1971, the hospital had 79 beds and 25 doctors. As of 1972, the hospital operated on a budget of $950,000 per year, with 69 beds, and a staff of 112.

=== 1050 Concordia Avenue ===
In 1974 the hospital opened the new facility at the current 1050 Concordia location with 124 beds. The facility was built at a cost of CA$7.5 million. In the same year, the hospital was investigated concerning possible medical, board and administrative irregularities surrounding incidents of patient deaths during 1973.

Concordia hospital workers joined the 1980 CUPE strike which included 3,000 non-medical workers as well as workers at the Health Sciences Centre, Winnipeg Cancer Foundation, and hospitals and nursing homes in Brandon, Dauphin, Selkirk, Gimli, Swan River, Portage la Prairie, and Pine Falls. The three-and-a-half week strike was ended June 20, 1980.

The obstetrics unit at Concordia Hospital was closed in 1983, in order to centralize obstetrics services at St Boniface Hospital and Health Sciences Centre. The Emergency Department was expanded in 1985. As the hospital continued to grow, Concordia was Winnipeg's third-busiest emergency unit in, despite being the smallest hospital in the city, and operating on a budget of only $19 million.

The hospital was considering an overnight closing the emergency department in 1993, closing the doors from midnight to 8am in order to save $280,000/year. Concordia Hospital became the first hospital in Canada to use laser treatment for prostate surgery, beginning in 1994. Aa one-week trial was conducted which was the largest trial at a single institution in North America.

A funding crisis struck Concordia Hospital in 1997, this forced the hospital to turn away patients that were being referred for basic blood tests and ultrasounds. At the time, the hospital had among the highest load of any city hospital with a 24-hour emergency room and the 136-bed hospital's budget was $27 million. More issues continued in the late 1990s with the hospital struggling with overcrowding in 1999 and was regularly keeping large numbers of patients on beds in the hallway as result of the unavailability of rooms. According to one nurse, it was the worst over-crowding the hospital had faced in at least 14 years. As of January, the Winnipeg Health Authority had a $70 million wish list of programs, but the government had only provided $31 million.

The 2000s saw the hospital opening a new 26-bed unit to help face the growing demands. This unit included a 14-bed Orthopedic Post Acute Surgical Unit, which was the first of its kind in Winnipeg, and a 12-bed Rehabilitation Unit. In late 2001, the Manitoba Nurses Union sent notice to nurses in the province asking nurses not to apply for jobs at Concordia hospital, citing continued management violations of the collective agreement. This action, which the union referred to as "greylisting", was the first of its kind in the province. In 2005, the Manitoba government made the hospital a centre of excellence in hip and knee replacements.

The hospital's Emergency Room underwent a $3.6-million renovation in 2008 increasing the size of the ER by nearly 2,000 square feet (190 m^{2}). The renovation included increased space for the triage area, minor treatment rooms and admitting desk, as well as the addition of counseling rooms and improvement of the medication rooms. The upgrades included the addition of an Emergency Department Information System (EDIS) which tracks information on patients that visit the ER. In 2015, the hospital had the longest recorded ER waits of any hospital in Canada, with 90% of patients in the ER being seen by a doctor within 7 hours. Concordia Hospital's emergency room was transitioned to an urgent care centre instead of a full service ER and caused frustrations and concern in the community as residents would now have to drive further to either the Health Sciences Centre or the St. Boniface Hospital to access emergency care.

== Other facilities ==
=== Concordia Place ===
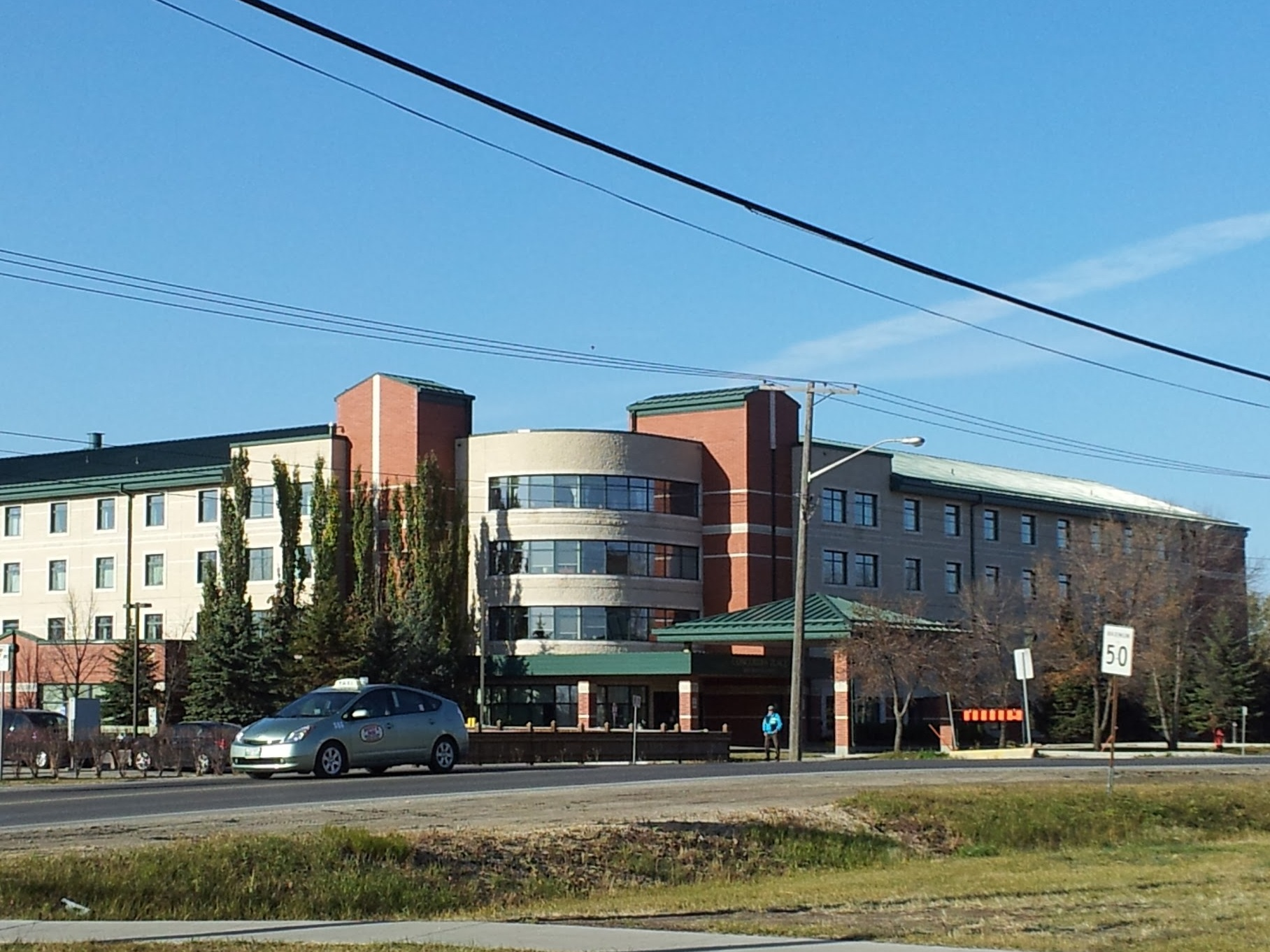
Concordia Place, 1000 Molson Street, Winnipeg Manitoba

In 1998, Concordia Hospital built Concordia Place, a personal care home adjacent to the hospital. Concordia Place opened on 10 May 2000, with 140 beds. Staff at Concordia Place include Registered and Licensed Practical Nurses, Health Care Aides, Recreation staff, a Clinical Dietitian, and Occupational Therapist, and a Chaplain, among others. Concordia Place features group activities and recreational programs and a dedicated chapel.

=== Concordia Village ===
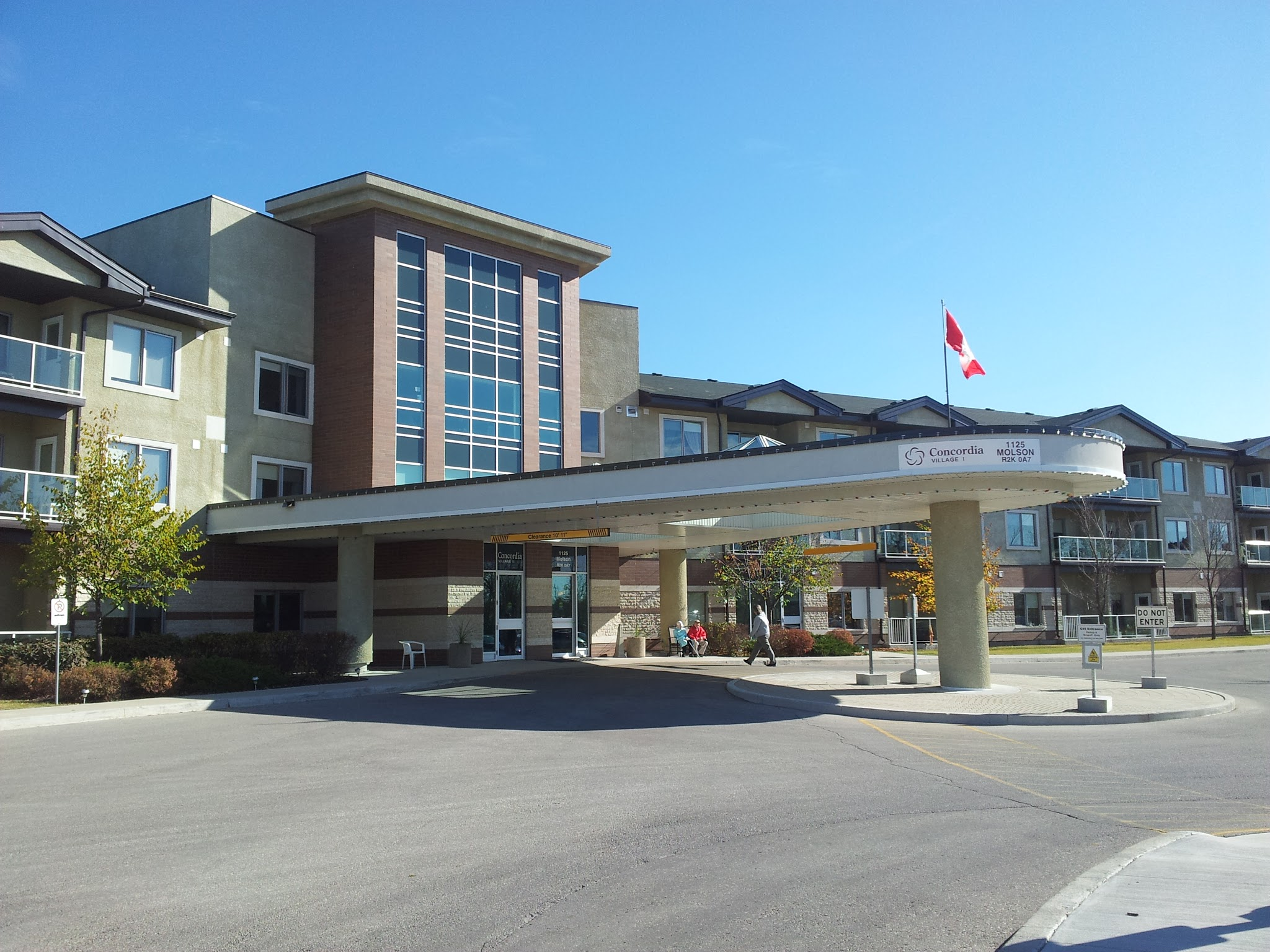
Entrance to Concordia Village I

Concordia Village is an assisted living facility located across from the hospital. The facility includes three buildings: Concordia Village I, Concordia Village II and Concordia Village III. Each facility features both one and two-bedroom apartment units with kitchens, storage and private balconies. Buildings I and II each have two guest suites for visiting families and other overnight guests. Concordia Village is owned and operated by Concordia Wellness Projects Inc., a non-profit registered charitable organization. Construction costs for the three villages were $12.0 million for Phase I, $16.8 million for Phase II, and $13 million for Phase III.

Village I has 94 units and was established in 2006 at 1125 Molson Street. Village II has 103 units and was established in 2008 at 1115 Molson Street. Village III has 90 units and was established in 2010 at 1115 Molson Street.

Concordia Village's services include:

- Dinner meal and continental breakfast
- Weekly housekeeping and daily garbage collection
- Personal security device
- Planned social/recreational activities and excursions
- Visiting home care workers
- Hair salons
- Monthly banking with Steinbach Credit Union (SCU)
- ATM machines

=== Concordia Hip and Knee Institute ===
In 2009 at Concordia Hospital opened a 60,000 square feet (5,600 m^{2}) building to house the Hip and Knee Institute. The cost of the equipment and office space for the institute were $8.8 million. The building includes a Shoppers Drug Mart. The third level is completely dedicated to the Hip and Knee Institute. The institute is home to a hip and knee assessment clinic, a digital imaging clinic, a research facility, a research laboratory, a training and education facility and a pre-habilitation clinic. The institute has a knee surgical simulator suite, a scanning electron microscope, a digital X-ray lab and an implants retrieval lab. The implants retrieval lab provides storage for worn-out replacement hip and knee joints for studying patterns of failure. The institute features a conference centre connected to an operating room where surgical procedures can be viewed on a television screen.

In 2012, the hospital performed 1,558 hip and knee surgeries, outpacing Grace Hospital's 1,476. Concordia also performed more joint replacements than any other Manitoba hospital.

== Controversies ==
- Concordia Hospital has been involved in outbreaks of highly contagious viruses and antibiotic-resistant superbugs. Based on data released covering 2006 through 2008: in 2007, the hospital saw 42 people infected with MRSA and 30 people infected with Norovirus, and in 2006 the hospital saw 82 Norovirus infections.
- A hand-hygiene audit completed in February 2012 found that front-line staff in hospitals do not sufficiently wash their hands. Reports reviewed two wards, N2W and N2E, and found compliance rates of only 58% and 48%.
