= Elmwood Cemetery (Winnipeg) =

- Interactive map of Elmwood Cemetery

Details
- Established: 1901
- Location: 88 Hespeler Avenue; Winnipeg, Manitoba; R2L 0L3
- Country: Canada
- Coordinates: 49°54′45″N 97°07′16″W
- Type: Public
- Owned by: Friends of Elmwood Cemetery
- Website: historicelmwoodcemetery.ca

Elmwood Cemetery is an historic 38 acres (15 ha) cemetery in Winnipeg, Manitoba, Canada. Adjacent to the Red River in Winnipeg's Elmwood neighbourhood, the cemetery was legally incorporated in 1901 as the first non-denominational burial ground in the city. It is run by the non-profit group Friends of Elmwood Cemetery. 151 veterans of World War I and World War II are buried at Elmwood and it is listed as a Commonwealth War Graves Commission cemetery.
