= Thomas Steen =

Swedish ice hockey player and coach

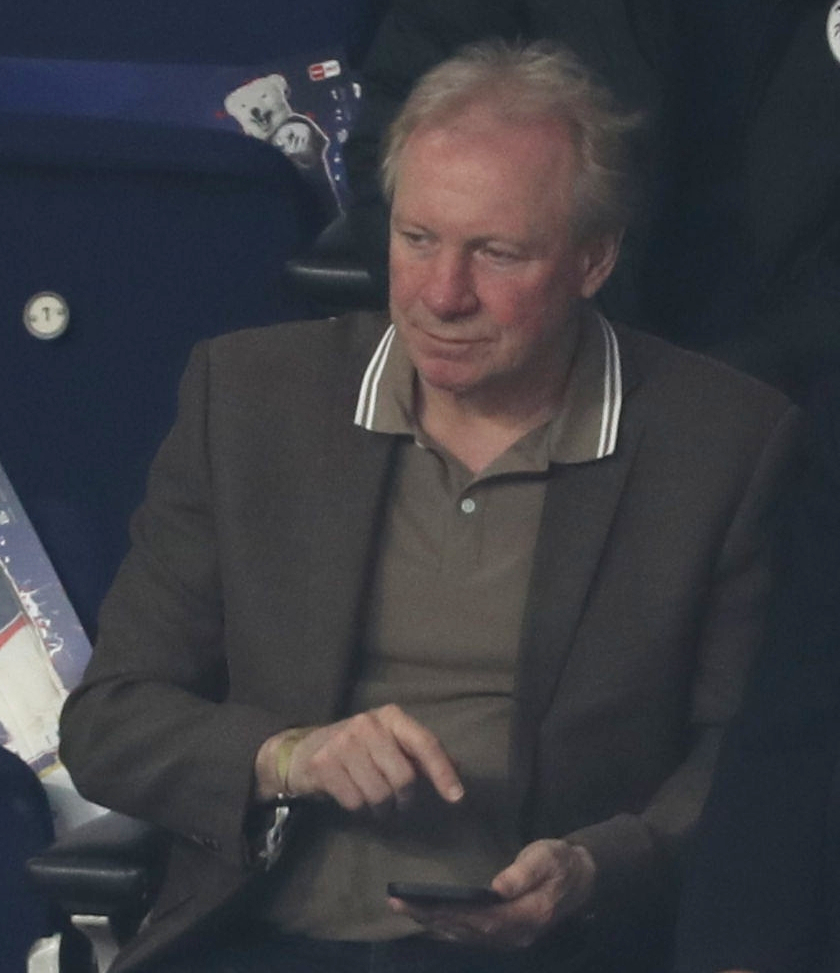
- Steen in 2022
- Born: June 8, 1960 (age 66) Grums, Sweden
- Height: 5 ft 10 in (178 cm)
- Weight: 195 lb (88 kg; 13 st 13 lb)
- Position: Centre
- Shot: Left
- Played for: Leksands IF; Färjestads BK; Winnipeg Jets; Frankfurt Lions; Eisbären Berlin
- National team: Sweden
- NHL draft: 103rd overall, 1979; Winnipeg Jets
- Playing career: 1976–1999

Winnipeg City Councillor for Elmwood-East Kildonan Ward
- In office 2010–2014
- Preceded by: Lillian Thomas
- Succeeded by: Jason Schreyer

Personal details
- Party: Conservative

Anders Thomas Steen (born June 8, 1960) is a Swedish-Canadian former professional ice hockey player, coach, and politician. Steen is the former city councillor for the Winnipeg ward of Elmwood-East Kildonan. Steen played professional ice hockey in the Elitserien, National Hockey League and Deutsche Eishockey Liga. In his time in the NHL, he spent the entirety of his career with the original Winnipeg Jets. His 553 assists ranked as the most in franchise history in the original Jets era.

== Ice hockey career ==
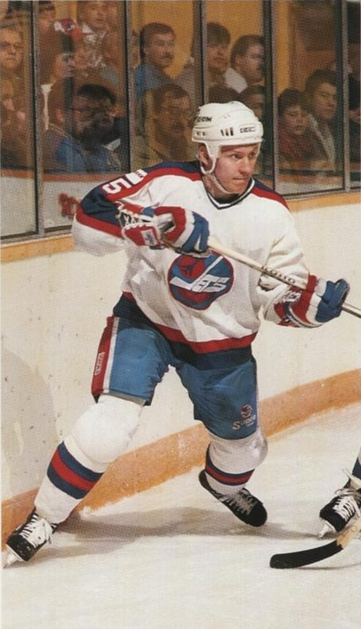
Steen in 1988 photo for Winnipeg Jets

Steen was born in Grums, Sweden, and began his career with Grums IK (1975–76). He later played for the elite Leksands IF (1976–80) and Färjestads BK (1980–81). Swedish coach Tommy Sandlin described him as "a particularly intelligent and competent player". He was drafted by the Sudbury Wolves of the Ontario Hockey League in 1978, but never played for the team.

Steen was drafted by the National Hockey League's Winnipeg Jets in 1979, as their fifth-round choice. He was signed two years later by John Ferguson, and went on to become one of the most prolific players in the team's history. Steen played a total of 950 regular season NHL games, scoring 264 goals and receiving 553 assists. In a 1987 interview, he said that his focus was on creating plays for others rather than scoring goals himself. A 1990 poll of NHL players named him as the league's most underrated player. Steen continued to play for the Swedish national team in World Championship games throughout his NHL career, and won silver medals at the 1981 World Championship in Gothenburg and the 1986 World Championship in Moscow.

There were discussions about Steen being traded to the Toronto Maple Leafs in early 1994, but these ultimately came to nothing. His record of playing fourteen seasons with only one team is unusual in modern North American professional sports. Steen retired in 1995, and his jersey number 25 was retired by the Jets. The number is still considered retired by the Jets' successor team, the Arizona Coyotes. A 2005 article in the National Post newspaper listed him as the second greatest player in the history of the Winnipeg Jets franchise, after Dale Hawerchuk. Unlike many professional hockey players, Steen was known throughout his career for his thoughtful responses to interview questions.

Steen worked with Manitoba Entertainment Complex Inc. in 1994, when the group was attempting to find a new downtown arena for the Jets. Some players questioned his judgement in this matter: failed labour negotiations had led to NHL players being locked out, and some believed it was a conflict of interest for Steen to promote a project supported by management. Others supported Steen's decision, arguing that he was acting in the best interests of the team.

He came out of retirement in 1996, playing seven regular season and playoff games for the Frankfurt Lions of the Deutsche Eishockey Liga at the end of their season. He then played three seasons for Eisbären Berlin before retiring again in 1999. Coincidentally, he announced his retirement on the same day as Wayne Gretzky. In January 2001, he was named European pro scout for the Minnesota Wild. He moved back to Winnipeg in the mid-2000s at the behest of his employer, and scouted talent in the American Hockey League.

Shortly after losing a 2008 election in Manitoba (see below), Steen returned to Sweden as an assistant coach for Modo Hockey of the Elitserien. Steen, however, later did return to Winnipeg and won a seat on the city council.

One of Steen's sons, Alexander Steen, is also a former professional hockey player who most recently played for the St. Louis Blues, playing left wing and serving as an alternate captain, also having won the Stanley Cup with the team in 2019.

== Charity and investments ==
Steen oversaw charity golf tournaments during and after his hockey career, with some proceeds going to children's charities. In 1993, he helped set up an organization of five Junior Jets teams in Winnipeg for younger players. In 2006, Steen and his son Alexander established an annual golf tournament to raise money for the Children's Hospital Foundation of Manitoba.

Steen and two partners purchased 50% ownership in the International Hockey League's Minnesota Moose team in 1996 and brought the franchise to Winnipeg the following year as the Manitoba Moose. He ultimately decided not to oversee the team in an ownership capacity and was appointed as director of player development. In 1997, he partnered with the team to create the Thomas Steen/Manitoba Moose Hockey School.

In 2006, Steen took part in a shareholder and creditor action against the directors of Maple Leaf Distillers and Protos International, seeking to have them repay $1.75 million invested over the last six years. The action alleged that the directors had unfairly disregarded the interests of shareholders and used company money for personal expenses. They denied the charges. Steen indicated that he felt betrayed by the directors, whom he previously considered to be personal friends. In March 2007, the presiding justice found in favour of the shareholders and creditors and ordered the directors to pay $875,000. The decision was upheld on appeal, and the Supreme Court of Canada later declined to review the case.

Many of the same investors later sued the Astra Credit Union, alleging that it was part of a "cheque-kiting" scheme that allowed the aforementioned directors to access millions of dollars in unauthorized loans. Astra initially rejected the charges as without merit. Later, Astra launched a third-party claim against its former chief credit officer and the former directors of Maple Leaf Distillers.

Steen donated an abstract painting/collage entitled Blood, Sweat, Tears, and A Lot of Love to a charity auction in Winnipeg in 2007.

== Political career ==
Steen indicated that he was considering a political career in January 2007, when he appeared at a news conference as a guest of federal Conservative cabinet minister Vic Toews. He later stood beside provincial Progressive Conservative leader Hugh McFadyen during the 2007 election, for an announcement that the PCs would bring NHL hockey back to Winnipeg if elected. The governing New Democrats described this promise as unrealistic, as did many in the local media. The New Democrats were returned with a majority government on election day. In a somewhat ironic twist, the NHL returned to Winnipeg in the final months of the NDP's 2007–11 term.

Steen was a candidate for the Conservative Party of Canada in the 2008 federal election, losing to New Democrat Jim Maloway in the northeast Winnipeg riding of Elmwood—Transcona. His opponents argued that Steen, who lives in south Winnipeg, was unfamiliar with issues pertaining to the riding. He was also criticized for missing several debates, and for only reading from written briefings during a debate at Kildonan East Collegiate. One journalist, writing that Steen was "by all accounts and appearances a lovely and honourable gentleman", also noted that he was "radically out of his depth, muzzled by his party and unfamiliar with the issues".

Two years after that election (with a coaching stint in Sweden in the interim), on October 27, 2010, Steen won election to Winnipeg City Council, representing the Elmwood-East Kildonan Ward, in the 2010 municipal election. He was defeated in the 2014 election by Jason Schreyer, the son of former Manitoba premier and Canadian governor general Ed Schreyer.

== Controversy ==
In May 2014, Steen was charged with assault and uttering threats in connection with an alleged domestic violence incident with a woman at a Winnipeg restaurant in May. Steen took a leave from city council and was suspended from his role with the Winnipeg Police Board while the investigation into the charges took place. He was defeated in his bid for reelection to Winnipeg city council in October later in the year.

A condition put upon Steen in relation to those charges was a "no contact" order with relation to the alleged victim. Steen violated that condition in July 2014 and was briefly jailed as a result.

In October 2016 it was reported the charges were stayed in June of that year, meaning that though the Crown is no longer actively prosecuting the case charges can be brought back within one year if the Crown decides to pursue them again.

== Awards and achievements ==
- European Junior Championship Gold Medalists (1977)
- World Junior Silver Medalists (1978)
- World Junior Bronze Medalists (1979)
- World Junior First All-Star Team (1979)
- World Junior Bronze Medalists (1980)
- Sweden Elitserien Player of Year (1981)
- Swedish World All-Star Team (1981, 1985, & 1986)
- Swedish Championship (1981)
- World Championship Silver Medalist (1981 & 1986)
- Played in the Canada Cup (1981, 1984, & 1991)
- Selected to the NHL All-Star Game (1990)
- The Winnipeg Jets retired his number 25 in 1995
- “Honoured Member” of the Manitoba Hockey Hall of Fame
- Member of the Manitoba Sports Hall of Fame

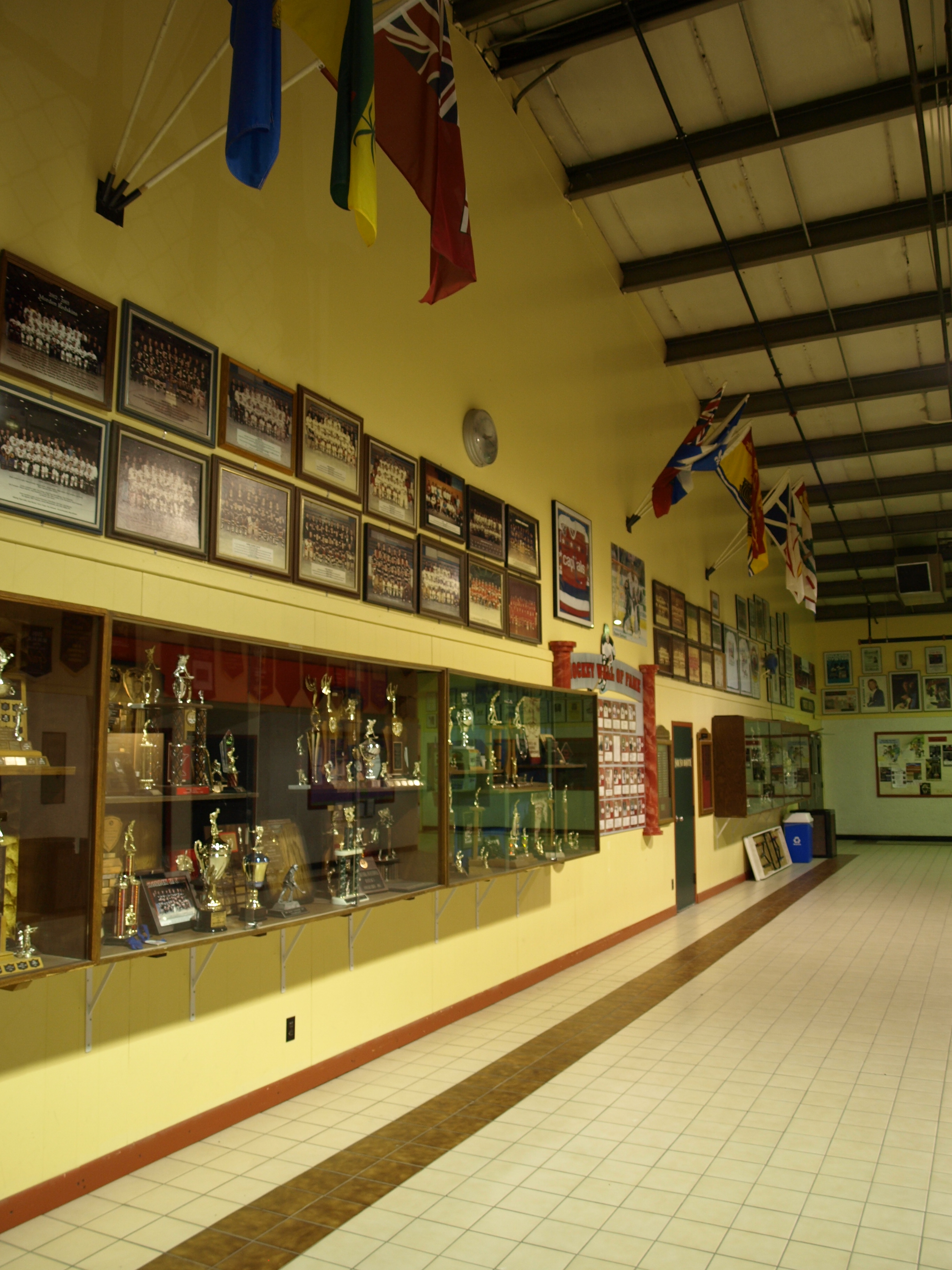
Thomas Steen is an honoured member of the Manitoba Hockey Hall of Fame

== Electoral record ==
2008 Canadian federal election: Elmwood—Transcona
Party	Candidate	Votes	%	±%	Expenditures
New Democratic	Jim Maloway	14,355	45.77	−5.07	$73,584.88
Conservative	Thomas Steen	12,776	40.74	+8.61	$60,628.72
Liberal	Wes Penner	2,079	6.63	−5.68	$30,542.33
Green	Chris Hrynkow	1,839	5.86	+2.23	$847.16
Christian Heritage	Robert Scott	312	0.99	−0.09	$2,735.85
Total valid votes/expense limit		31,361	99.68	–	$77,369.61
Total rejected ballots		100	0.32	−0.08	
Turnout		31,461	54.04	−4.16	
Electors on the lists		58,216			
New Democratic hold		Swing		−6.84	

== Career statistics ==
=== Regular season and playoffs ===
			Regular season					Playoffs
Season	Team	League	GP	G	A	Pts	PIM	GP	G	A	Pts	PIM
1975–76	Grums IK	SWE II	21	4	5	9	—	—	—	—	—	—
1976–77	Leksands IF	SEL	2	1	1	2	2	—	—	—	—	—
1977–78	Leksands IF	SEL	35	5	6	11	30	—	—	—	—	—
1978–79	Leksands IF	SEL	25	13	4	17	35	2	0	0	0	0
1979–80	Leksands IF	SEL	18	7	7	14	14	2	0	0	0	6
1980–81	Färjestads BK	SEL	32	16	23	39	30	7	4	2	6	8
1981–82	Winnipeg Jets	NHL	73	15	29	44	42	4	0	4	4	2
1982–83	Winnipeg Jets	NHL	75	26	33	59	60	3	0	2	2	0
1983–84	Winnipeg Jets	NHL	79	20	45	65	69	3	0	1	1	9
1984–85	Winnipeg Jets	NHL	70	30	54	84	80	8	2	3	5	17
1985–86	Winnipeg Jets	NHL	78	17	47	64	76	3	1	1	2	4
1986–87	Winnipeg Jets	NHL	75	17	33	50	59	10	3	4	7	8
1987–88	Winnipeg Jets	NHL	76	16	38	54	53	5	1	5	6	2
1988–89	Winnipeg Jets	NHL	80	27	61	88	80	—	—	—	—	—
1989–90	Winnipeg Jets	NHL	53	18	48	66	35	7	2	5	7	16
1990–91	Winnipeg Jets	NHL	58	19	48	67	49	—	—	—	—	—
1991–92	Winnipeg Jets	NHL	38	13	25	38	29	7	2	4	6	2
1992–93	Winnipeg Jets	NHL	80	22	50	72	75	6	1	3	4	2
1993–94	Winnipeg Jets	NHL	76	19	32	51	32	—	—	—	—	—
1994–95	Winnipeg Jets	NHL	31	5	10	15	14	—	—	—	—	—
1995–96	Frankfurt Lions	DEL	4	1	0	1	2	—	—	—	—	—
1996–97	Eisbären Berlin	DEL	49	15	18	33	48	8	0	2	2	27
1997–98	Eisbären Berlin	DEL	43	4	7	11	20	10	3	4	7	10
1998–99	Eisbären Berlin	DEL	40	7	15	22	28	8	1	5	6	2
SEL totals			110	42	41	83	111	11	4	2	6	14
NHL totals			950	264	553	817	753	56	12	32	44	62
DEL totals			136	27	40	67	98	29	4	12	16	45

=== International ===
Year	Team	Event	GP	G	A	Pts	PIM
1977	Sweden	EJC	6	5	3	8	6
1978	Sweden	WJC	7	3	3	6	4
1979	Sweden	WJC	6	5	1	6	6
1980	Sweden	WJC	5	2	4	6	12
1981	Sweden	WC	8	1	3	4	6
1981	Sweden	CC	3	0	0	0	2
1984	Sweden	CC	8	7	1	8	4
1986	Sweden	WC	8	8	3	11	16
1989	Sweden	WC	10	2	4	6	10
1991	Sweden	CC	6	0	3	3	11
Junior totals			24	15	11	26	28
Senior totals			43	18	14	32	49

== See also ==
- Notable families in the NHL

Preceded by Dale Hawerchuk	Winnipeg Jets captain 1989–91 with Dale Hawerchuk, 1989–90, and Randy Carlyle, 1989–91	Succeeded by Troy Murray
