= Garden City, Winnipeg =

Neighbourhood in Winnipeg, Manitoba, Canada

Garden City
- Neighbourhood
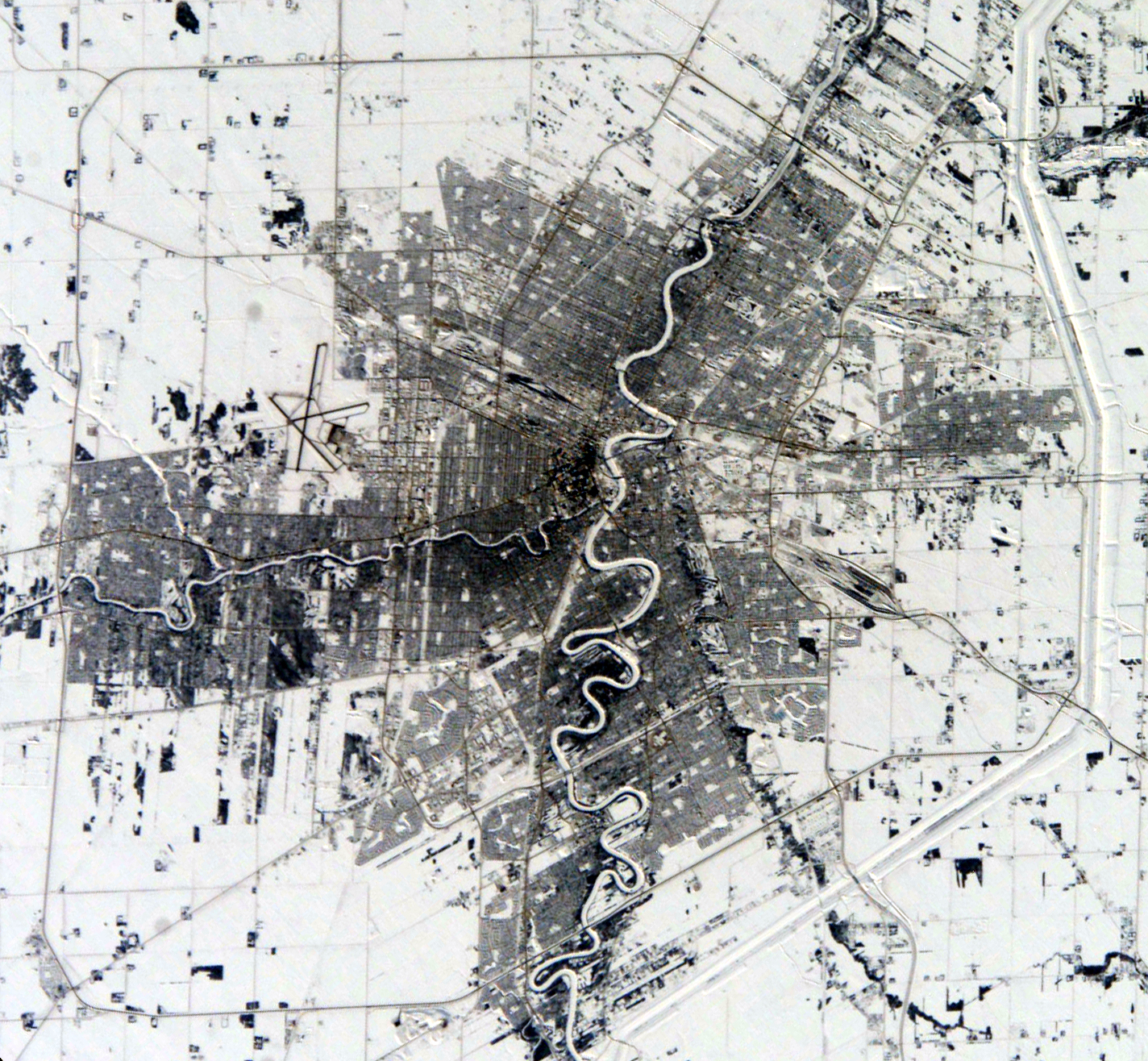
- Location within Winnipeg
- Coordinates: 49°56′34″N 97°08′41″W
- Developed: 1955
- Named for: Garden City, Minnesota

Area
  - Total: 2.3 km^{2} (0.89 sq mi)

Population (2021)
  - Total: 6,475
  - Density: 2,700.2/km^{2} (6,993/sq mi)
- Time zone: UTC-6 (Central Standard Time)
  - Summer (DST): UTC-5 (Central Daylight Time)
- Forward Sortatation Area: R2W
- Area codes: Area codes 204 and 431

Garden City is a suburban neighbourhood in Winnipeg, Manitoba.

The area features large homes and residential lots, numerous parks and schools, and includes Garden City Shopping Centre, a regional mall. It has a land area of 2.3-square-kilometre (570-acre), with the population growing to 6,475 as of 2021. The garden themes are continued throughout the development, with many floral inspired street names including Buttercup Avenue, Daffodil Street and Tulip Road.

The suburb is in the civic council ward of Old Kildonan, the community area of Seven Oaks, the provincial riding of McPhillips, and the federal riding of Kildonan—St. Paul.

== History ==
The suburb was developed by Model Homes Limited, which estimated a cost of $20 million to develop the nearly 420-acre (170 ha) master planned community. Plans for the project were first announced in 1951; starting in 1955, the area was developed as an upscale master planned community during the post-World War II housing boom, with most of the houses constructed in the mid-century modern style.

The area's boundaries are the CPR Winnipeg Beach subdivision to the east, Carruthers Avenue to the south, McPhillips Street to the west, and Leila Avenue to the north. Prior to the City of Winnipeg's amalgamation in 1972, the neighbourhood made up a large portion of the former City of West Kildonan.

Model Homes Limited's plans for the development featured 1,500 homes, the Garden City shopping centre, six schools, churches, synagogues, parks and recreation areas. The area was marketed as the leading Winnipeg area suburb, featuring above average sized lots and larger homes. Expectations were that the building of Garden City would raise the population of the former City of West Kildonan from 14,000 to 20,000.

== Modern architecture ==
The Garden City development is a showcase for mid-century modern architecture, with most of the homes in the area designed in a modernist-influenced ranch-style. Popular design elements include clean lines, large windows, carports and breeze block detailing and fencing. Many of the homes have retained these original features and the area has continued to grow in popularity with the resurgence of mid-century modern design.

== Demographics ==
Population history
Year	Pop.	±%
1971	8,050	—
1976	8,055	+0.1%
1981	7,040	−12.6%
1986	6,465	−8.2%
1991	5,920	−8.4%
1996	5,715	−3.5%
2001	5,650	−1.1%
2006	5,760	+1.9%
2011	6,010	+4.3%
2016	6,255	+4.1%
2021	6,475	+3.5%

As of 2021, Garden City had a population of 6,475. The median household income was $89,000, slightly above the city median of $80,000. There were 2,335 occupied private dwellings; 1,850 semi-detached houses, 445 apartments, and 40 duplexes or semi-detached houses. the median value of the dwellings is $324,00.

The area is home to a large portion of Winnipeg's Jewish community. Numerous synagogues, organizations, retirement homes and businesses catering to the Jewish community can be found throughout Garden City and the surrounding West Kildonan area. The neighbourhood also has many residents from Winnipeg's Ukrainian, German and Polish communities. Schools in the area feature both Hebrew and Ukrainian bilingual programs.

Garden City is home to 2,125 Filipinos, which collectively make up 32.8% of the neighbourhood's population.

== Points of interest ==
=== Public schools ===
Garden City is a part of the Seven Oaks School Division, and includes the following schools:

- Elementary
  - Forest Park School
  - R.F. Morrison School (features Ukrainian bilingual program)
  - H.C. Avery School (features Hebrew and Ukrainian bilingual programs)
  - Collicutt School
- High schools
  - Garden City Collegiate (features French Immersion program)
  - Met School - Garden City

Faith Academy Middle School is a private school in the neighbourhood.

=== Sports/athletic ===
- Garden City Community Centre
  - Seven Oaks Sportsplex
    - Seven Oaks Arena
    - Seven Oaks Soccerplex

=== Other points of interest ===
- Garden City Shopping Centre
- Seven Oaks House Museum
- Northgate Shopping Centre
- Chevra Mishnayes Synagogue
- Ten Ten Sinclair
- Mom's Perogy Factory
