= 1971 Winnipeg municipal election =

The 1971 Winnipeg municipal election was held in October 1971 to elect a mayor, councillors and school trustees in the City of Winnipeg. This was the first municipal election to take place after the amalgamation of Winnipeg with its suburban communities. Stephen Juba, who was the last mayor of Winnipeg before amalgamation, was elected to the same position in the new city. Fifty councillors were elected in 50 separate single-member wards.

== Results ==
1971 Winnipeg municipal election: Mayor
| Candidate | Votes | % |
|---|---|---|
| Stephen Juba | 139,174 | 69.68 |
| Jack Willis | 49,014 | 24.54 |
| William Hutton | 8,536 | 4.27 |
| Gordon Anderson | 2,765 | 1.38 |
| Peter Shewchenko | 230 | 0.12 |
| Total valid votes | 199,719 | 100.00 |
