= Michael Mulvey (photographer) =

American photographer

- Born: 1968 (age 57–58); Austin, Texas (United States)
- Education: Texas A&M University

Michael Mulvey is an American Fine Art and editorial photographer specializing in storytelling. His images reflect the complexities of the subjects photographed for both publications and collections. He is an MFA candidate at Texas Women's University, in Denton, Texas. In 2005 he was one member of a team that covered the Hurricane Katrina tragedy for The Dallas Morning News and won the Pulitzer Prize for Breaking News Photography in 2006.

Mulvey's professional career includes 13 years as a senior staff photographer and photo editor at The Dallas Morning News. Early in Mulvey's career he worked professionally as a photographer with the Reuters News Agency, The Boston Globe, The Augusta Chronicle, The Associated Press, and The Bryan College Station Eagle.

Michael Mulvey was born in 1968 in Austin, Texas. Mulvey was raised in Dallas and grew up in the RISD school system and graduated from Richardson High School in 1986, and attended Texas A&M University where he graduated with a B.S degree in Journalism.
