= Elmwood, Winnipeg =

Neighbourhood in Winnipeg, Manitoba, Canada

Coordinates: 49°54′32″N 97°05′42″W

Elmwood
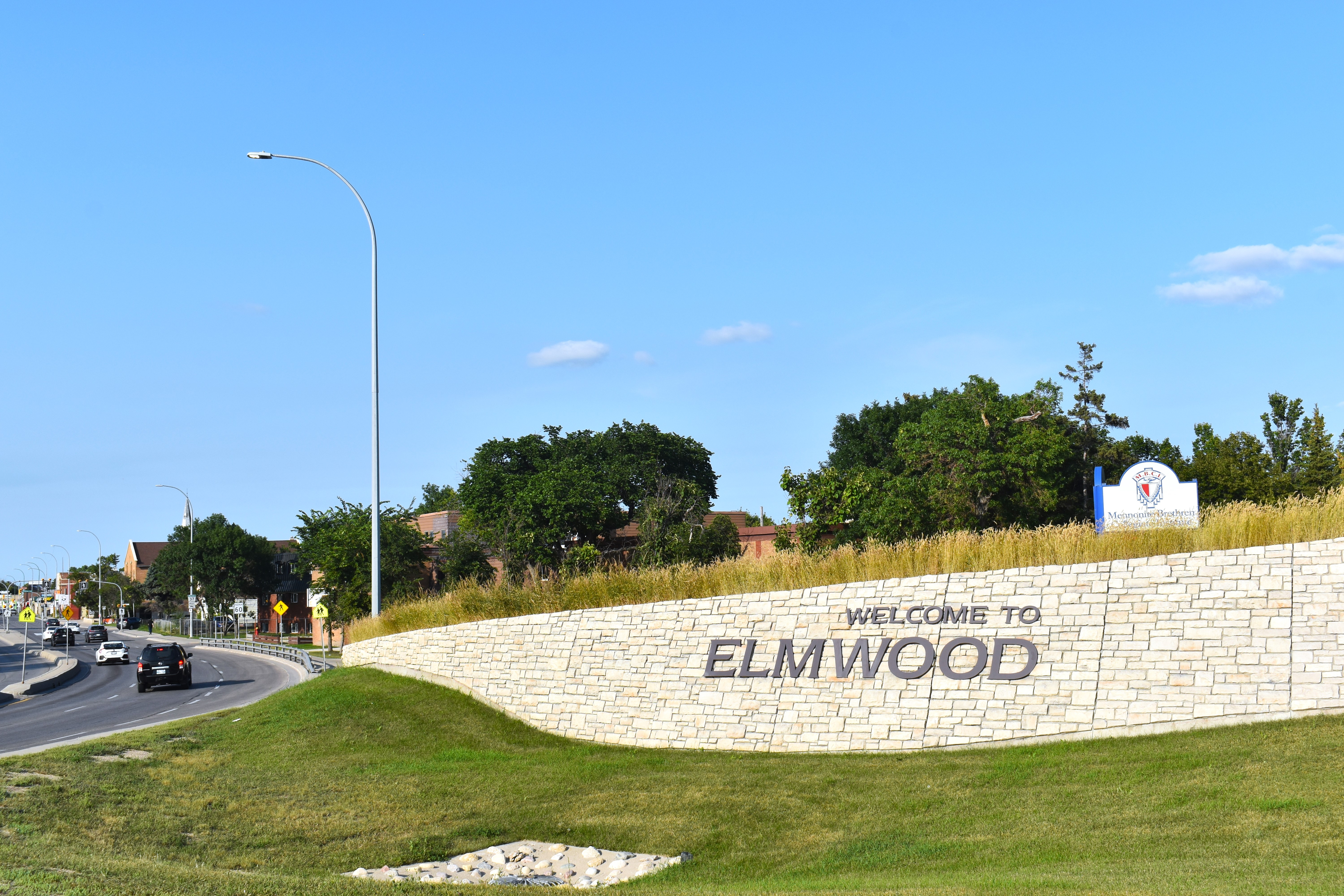
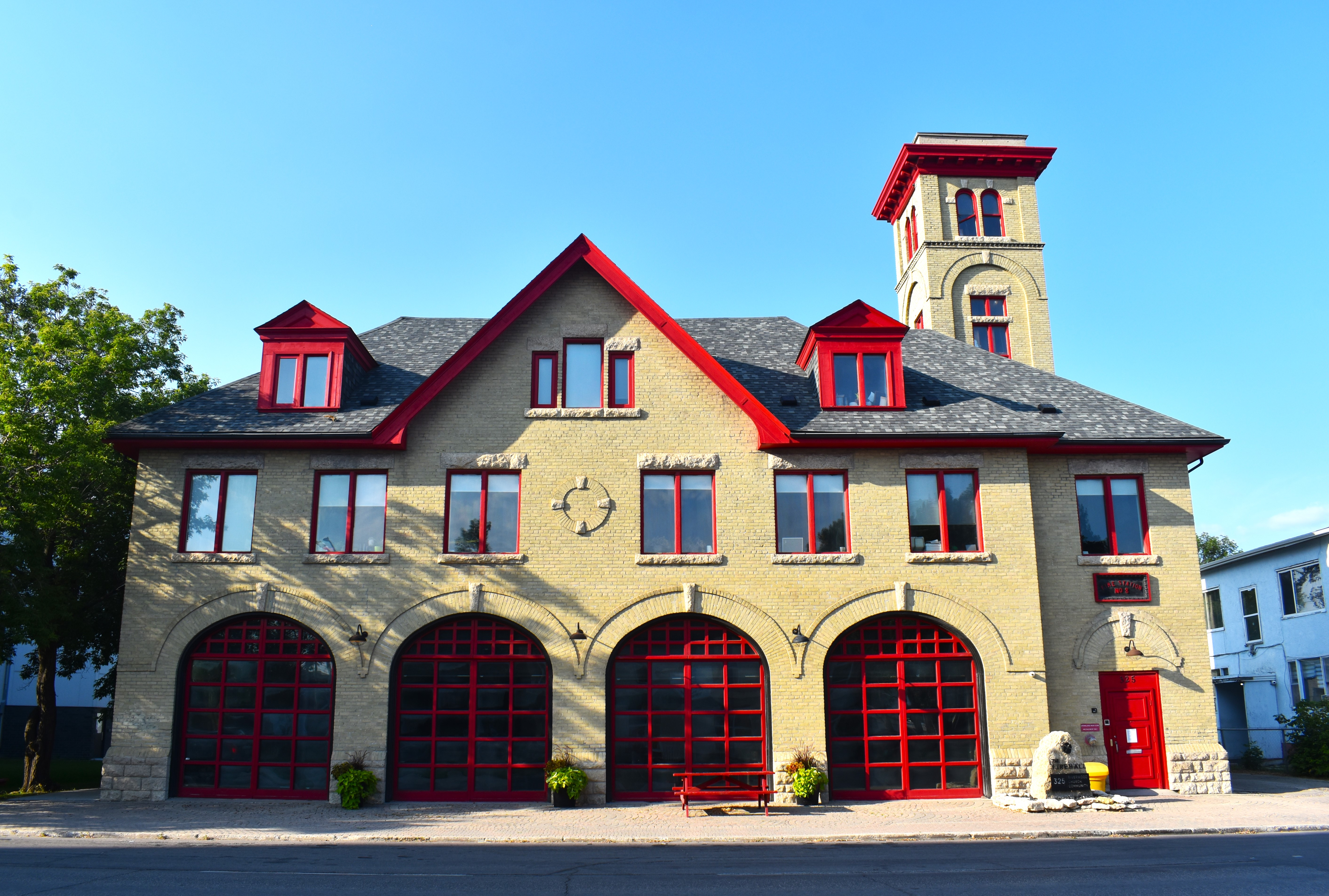
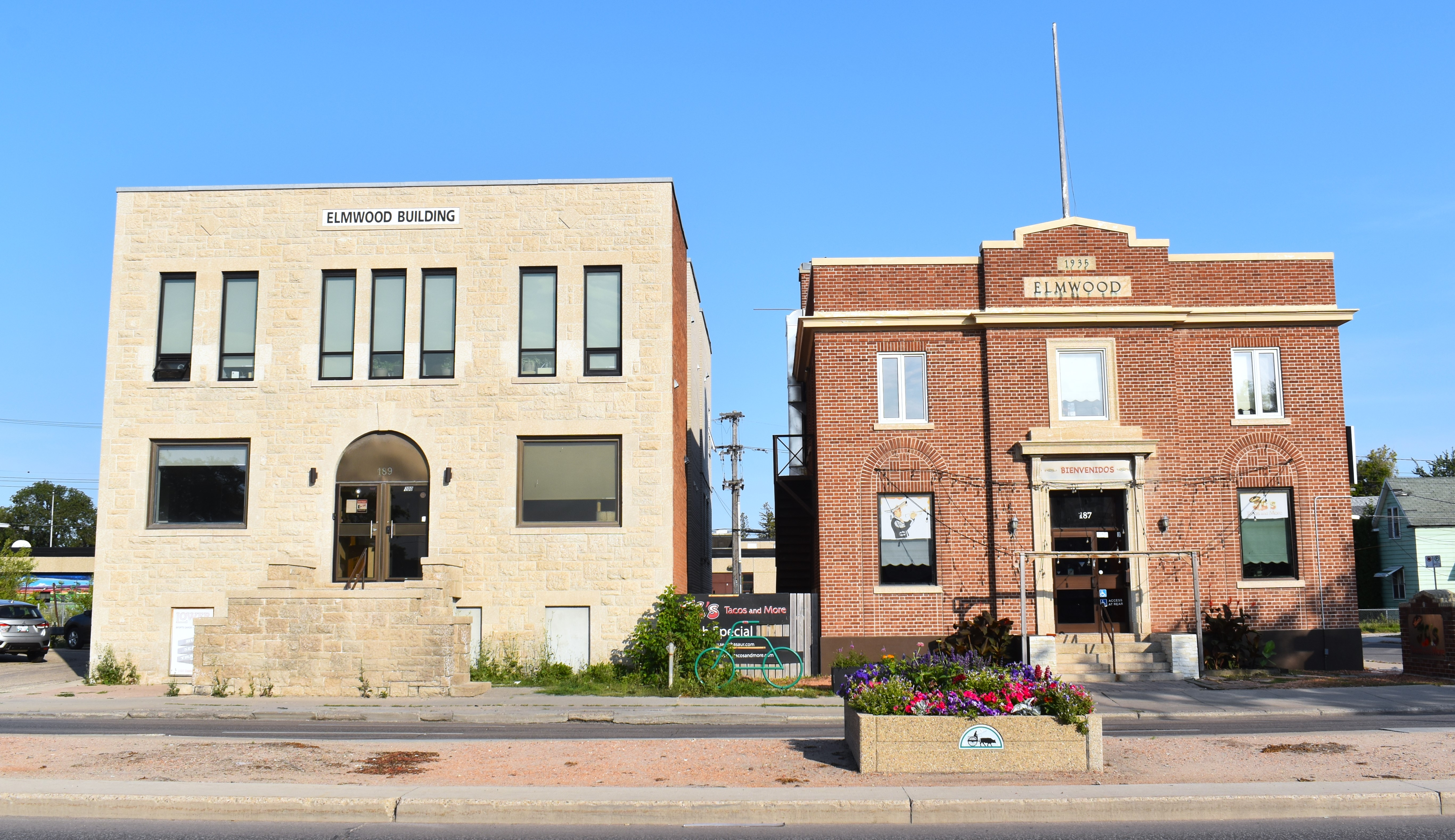
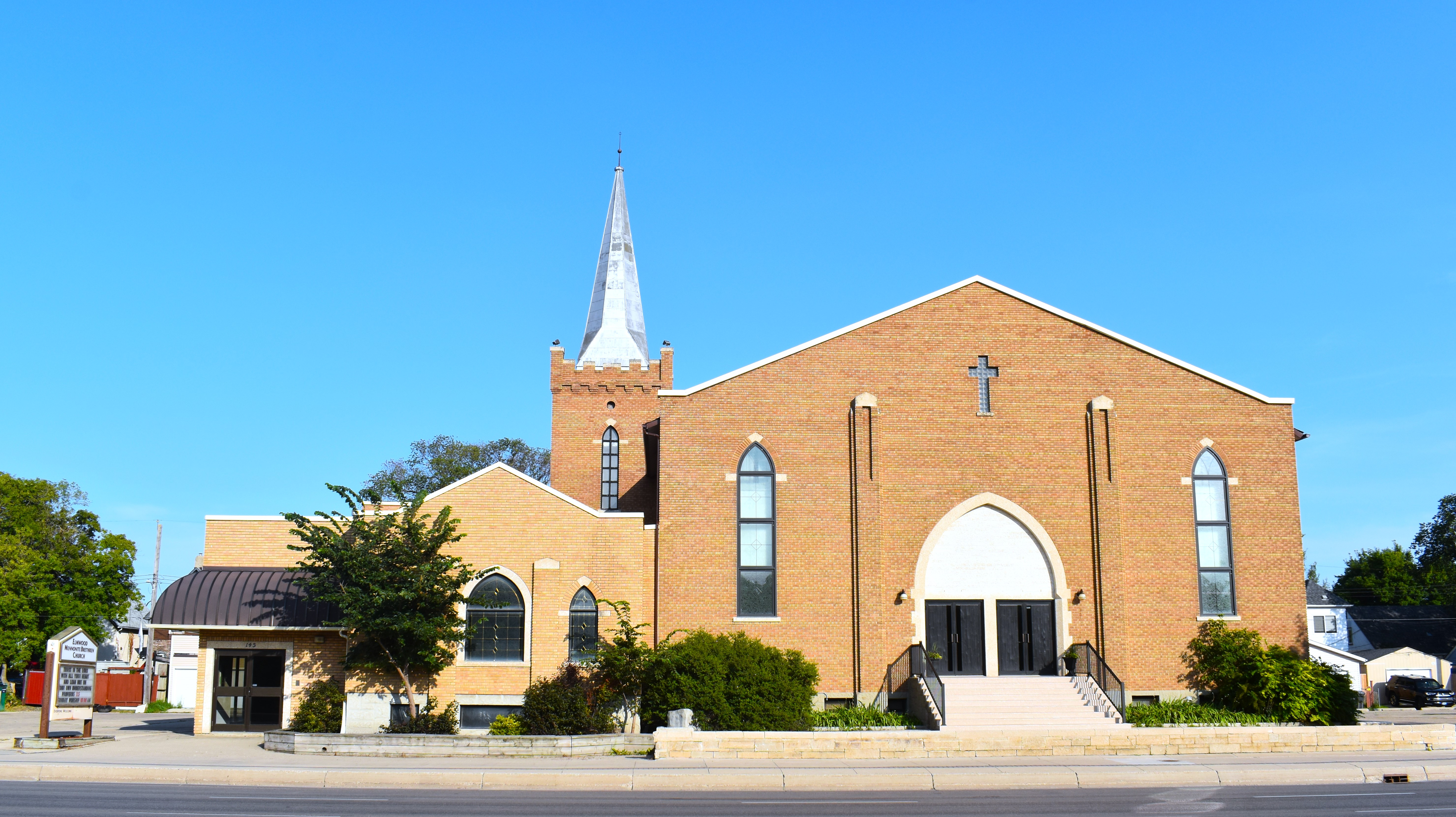
- Interactive map of Elmwood
- Country: Canada
- Province: Manitoba
- City: Winnipeg

Government
  - MLA: Jim Maloway (NDP)
  - City Councillor: Emma Durand-Wood (Elmwood-East Kildonan Ward)

Population (2021)
  - Total: 18,170

Elmwood is a primarily working-class residential area of Winnipeg, Manitoba. It is the only part of the historic (i.e., pre-amalgamation) city of Winnipeg located east of the Red River. It includes the areas of Glenelm, which is more affluent and lies west of Henderson Highway, most of Chalmers, Talbot-Grey, and East Elmwood, which was developed primarily in the 1950s. Elmwood is mostly composed of single family residential homes, though there are numerous low-rise apartment blocks, townhouses, and two high rise apartment complexes, which are both social housing projects.

The area was named for the Elmwood Cemetery, which opened in 1902. Prior to this, the area was known as the Louise Bridge District or Kildonan Village. Elmwood is bordered by the lane between Harbison and Larsen Avenues (extended) on the North, Panet Road on the East, Thomas and Tyne Avenues and the Canadian Pacific mainline on the South, and the Red River on the west.

Elmwood was once the southern part of the Municipality of Kildonan and began to develop shortly after the Louise Bridge was opened in 1881. It was annexed to Winnipeg in 1906 after a petition by the residents who wanted city services in their rapidly developing neighbourhood. It was originally a separate ward of Winnipeg, Ward Seven, but later it was joined with the North End as part of Ward Three. Until the 1950s, Elmwood was one of the most industrialized areas of Winnipeg and had a large meat packing plant, a furniture manufacturer, and a box factory, among other operations. All of these have now closed, and the area is almost completely de-industrialized. Since the advent of the unicity in 1971, Elmwood is often lumped together with East Kildonan, to the ire of residents of East Kildonan, which was once a separate city.

As of the 2016 census Elmwood has about 17,500 residents, a decline of about 5,000 since 1971. The average household income is about three-quarters of the Winnipeg average, with 78 per cent of residents making less than $50,000 per year. Nearly a quarter of residents do not possess a high school education, and only 41.5% of Elmwood residents have any form of post-secondary education. This is 12% lower than the city average.

== Crime rates ==
The table below shows the crime rates of various crimes in each of the Elmwood neighbourhoods. The crime data spans 5 years from the year 2017 to the year 2021. The rates are crimes per 100,000 residents per year.

Crime Rates per 100,000 people in Elmwood Neighbourhoods, 2017-2021
Neighbourhood	Pop.	Homicide	Rate (Note: Rate per 100,000 people per year: Figure is calculated by dividing the total incidences of a crime by the neighbourhood population, then multiplying by 100,000, and then dividing by 5, as the data spans 5 years)	Robbery	Rate	Agr. Aslt. (Note: Aggravated assault: Includes assaults which cause bodily harm or utilize weapons; includes the following categories given on Winnipeg CrimeMaps: aggravated assault, aggravated sexual assault, assault against peace officer, assault with weapon or causing bodily harm, attempted murder, firearms offences, sexual assault with a weapon.)	Rate	Cmn. Aslt (Note: Common assault: Excludes assaults which cause bodily harm or utilize weapons; includes the following categories given on Winnipeg CrimeMaps: assault against peace officer, common assault, other assaults, sexual assault.)	Rate	Utt. Threat (Note: Abbreviated from: uttering threats)	Rate	Property	Rate
Chalmers	9,655	4	8.3	204	422.6	251	519.9	462	957.0	122	252.7	3,408	7,059.6
East Elmwood	3,425	0	0.0	18	105.1	62	362.0	153	893.4	38	221.9	768	4,484.7
Glenelm	2,155	0	0.0	24	222.7	31	287.7	30	278.4	23	213.5	796	7,387.5
Kildonan Crossing	0	1	--	22	--	11	--	37	--	15	--	446	--
Munroe West	3,010	0	0	32	212.6	20	132.9	58	385.4	18	119.6	857	5,694.4
Talbot-Grey	2,325	0	0.0	27	232.3	56	481.7	72	619.4	18	154.8	640	5,505.4
Tyne-Tees	0	0	--	24	--	8	--	18	--	5	--	617	--
Elmwood	20,570	5	4.9	351	341.3	439	426.8	830	807.0	239	232.4	7,532	7,323.3
