= West Kildonan =

Suburb of Winnipeg, Canada

- Suburb
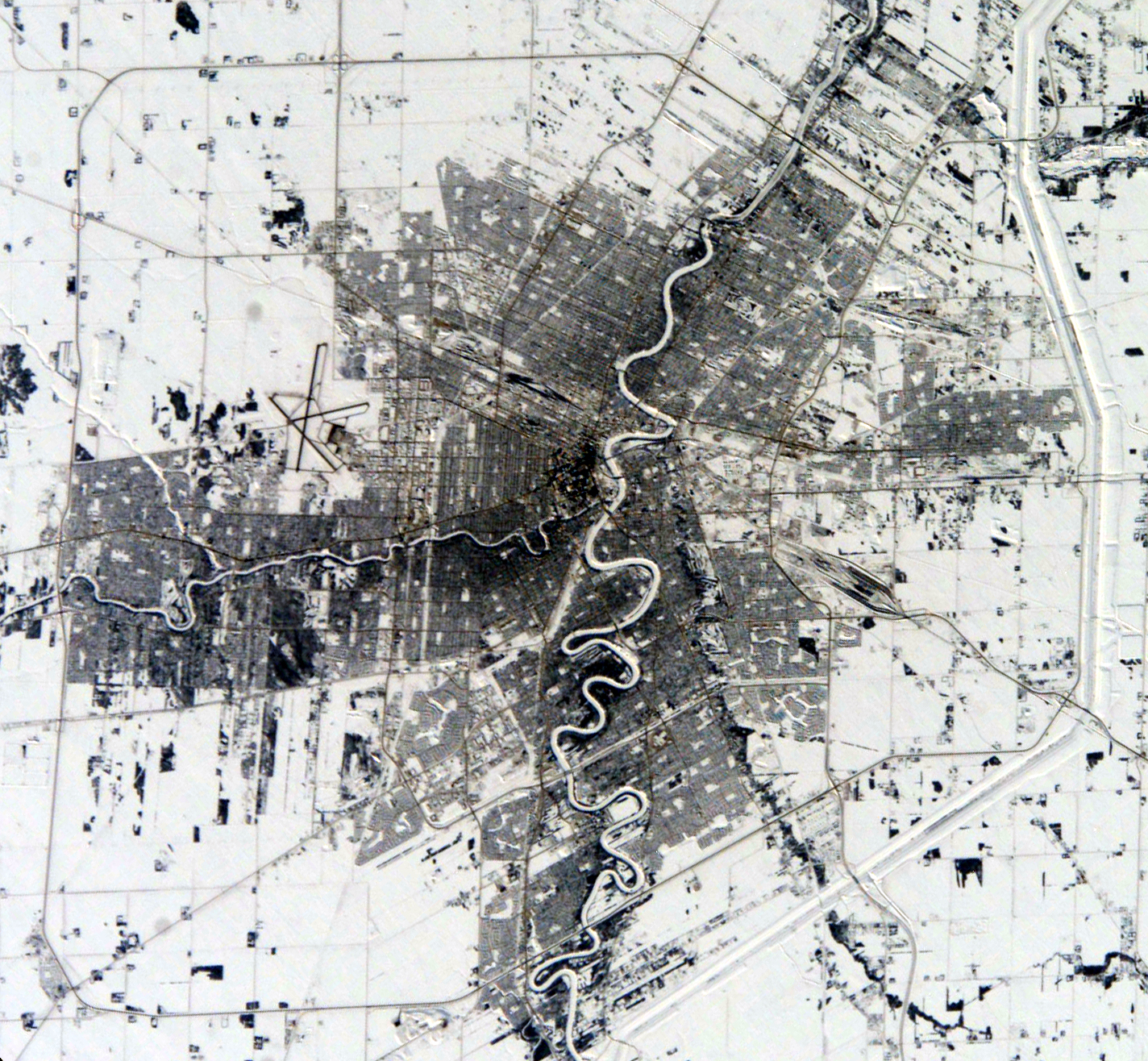
- Location within Winnipeg
- Coordinates: 49.933°N 97.117°W
- Country: Canada
- Province: Manitoba
- City: Winnipeg
- Established: 1876
- Rural Municipality: 1880
- Incorporated as Town: 1921
- Incorporated as a City: April 1961

Area
  - Suburb: 14.1 km^{2} (5.4 sq mi)
  - Metro: 5,306.79 km^{2} (2,048.96 sq mi)
- Elevation: 231 m (758 ft)

Population (2016)
  - Suburb: 38,555
  - Density: 2,730/km^{2} (7,080/sq mi)
  - Metro: 778,489
- Time zone: UTC-6 (CST)
  - Summer (DST): UTC-5 (CDT)
- Forward Sortation Area: R2V
- Area codes: 204, 431

West Kildonan is a residential suburb within the Old Kildonan and Mynarski city wards of Winnipeg, Manitoba, lying on the west side of the Red River of the North, and immediately north of the old City of Winnipeg in the north-central part of the city.

It is bounded by the Red River on the east; the north limit of Kildonan Golf Course, Main Street, Seaforth Avenue, the Canadian Pacific Railway Winnipeg Beach Subdivision, and Templeton Avenue on the north; McPhillips Street on the west; and Carruthers Avenue, McGregor Street, and the lane between McAdam and Smithfield Avenues on the south.

It is notably home to Kildonan Park, West Kildonan Collegiate, and the former West Kildonan North Stars.

== History ==
The Battle of Seven Oaks was fought in what is now West Kildonan in 1816. The area was part of the original Municipality of Kildonan, which was established in 1876. Kildonan was divided in eastern and western halves in 1914 and the more heavily developed areas of West Kildonan separated from areas which remained primarily rural (Old Kildonan) to assume the current boundaries in 1921. West Kildonan is one of Winnipeg's earliest residential suburbs.

The areas east of the CPR Winnipeg Beach tracks and south of Hartford Avenue were substantially developed by the 1910s and 1920s. West of the tracks, the Garden City neighbourhood was developed in the 1950s and 1960s, as was the area north of Hartford Avenue east of the tracks. The Garden Park community located north of Leila Avenue and west of the CPR tracks was developed beginning in the late 1950s.

The R.M.'s municipal hall was located at 1760 Main Street.

In January 1961 the Rural Municipality of West Kildonan asked the Province to designate it as a City. At the time the R.M. had a total tax assessment of C$15 million with a population of 19,000 citizens. Final approval by the Manitoba Legislature was given in April 1961 for the R.M. of West Kildonan and the Town of Transcona to formally become cities via minor amendments to their respective municipal and provincial Acts. The first council meeting operating as the City of West Kildonan took place on April 25, 1961. Prior to 1972, it was the independent City of West Kildonan. Today, it is a popular suburb of the City of Winnipeg.

== Demographics ==
Federal census population history of West Kildonan
Year	Pop.	±%
1901	668	—
1906	675	+1.0%
1911	1,767	+161.8%
1916	3,676	+108.0%
1921	4,641	+26.3%
1926	5,657	+21.9%
1931	6,132	+8.4%
1936	6,042	−1.5%
1941	6,110	+1.1%
1946	6,579	+7.7%
1951	10,754	+63.5%
1956	15,256	+41.9%
1961	20,077	+31.6%
1966	22,240	+10.8%
1971	23,959	+7.7%
Source: Statistics Canada

Early on, West Kildonan attracted many people from Winnipeg's working class North End who became more affluent beginning after World War I, but who wished to remain close to their roots. To this day, the area has a large Eastern European population.

This area, along with nearby Garden City are home to large portions of Winnipeg's Jewish population. Historically, the West Kildonan and Garden City areas have been two of Canada's largest Jewish neighbourhoods. Synagogues, Hebrew educational programming, Kosher supermarkets and Jewish cemeteries are common throughout the area. In recent years condominiums catering to the Jewish community have become increasingly popular.

== See also ==
- Garden City, Winnipeg
- Winnipeg
