= Law, government, and crime in Winnipeg =

Governance of city in Manitoba, Canada

Winnipeg City Council 2026–2030
Mayor	Scott Gillingham
River Heights-Fort Garry	Sara MacArthur
Charleswood-Tuxedo-Westwood	Evan Duncan
Waverly West	Jasmine Brar
St. James	Kelly Ryback
Fort Rouge-East Fort Garry	Jeff Palmer
North Kildonan	Jeff Browaty
St. Boniface	Matt Allard
Old Kildonan	Greg McFarlane
Point Douglas	Vivian Santos
Daniel McIntyre	Cindy Gilroy
St. Vital	Chris Sigurdson
St. Norbert-Seine River	Ray DuBois
Elmwood-East Kildonan	Emma Durand-Wood
Transcona	Lora Meseman
Mynarski	Natalie Smith

The municipal government of Winnipeg is represented by 15 city councillors and a mayor elected every four years.

Along with being the current provincial capital of Manitoba, Winnipeg has served as the capital for two other Canadian territories: the North-West Territories, from 1870 to 1876, and the District of Keewatin, from 1876 to 1905.

In the past, Winnipeg has garnered a reputation as the "gang capital" of Canada and, in 2013, the Canadian Police Association claimed that gangs were "a key and distinguishing feature of the urban landscape in Winnipeg." In 2019, there were an estimated 4,000 local gang members in Winnipeg—around 1,500 full members and 2,500 associates—spread out between 25 and 30 separate gangs.

From 2018 to 2019, the Winnipeg Census Metropolitan Area had the largest Crime Severity Index increase (+22) in the number of homicides in Canada overall. Winnipeg in 2019 also dealt with a record breaking year in homicides with 44 and a rise in violent property crimes. Two months before the end of 2022, Winnipeg broke its own record for the most homicides in a year, with 45 homicides by the beginning of October, and 53 being reported by the end of the year, giving the city a homicide rate of 7.1 per 100,000 people. In 2017, Winnipeg had among the highest number (192) of police officers per capita among major Canadian cities (i.e., those with populations of 500,000 or more).

Scott Gillingham was elected as the 44th Mayor of the City of Winnipeg after a very tight race against Glen Murray, on October 26, 2022. Winnipeg is also represented in the Canadian House of Commons by eight Members of Parliament.

== Politics ==
=== Early years ===
Winnipeg officially became a city on 8 November 1873, with the passing of An Act to Incorporate the City of Winnipeg by the Manitoba Legislature. The Act would outline the essential powers of Winnipeg City Council, and provide a precise description of the city's boundaries (the city itself being 3 square miles at incorporation):

- Its southern and eastern boundaries were marked by the Assiniboine and Red Rivers
- Its western boundary was marked by present-day Maryland Street, Notre Dame Avenue, and McPhillips Street
- Its northern boundary was marked by Burrows Avenue, west of Main Street, and Aberdeen Avenue, east of Main Street.

With 4 city wards in total, Winnipeg's first civic election took place on 5 January 1874, for which voters had to be (1) male; (2) 21 years of age; (3) British subjects by birth or naturalization; (4) resident in the City at least 3 months prior to the election; and (5) own property valued at $100 or more, or pay at least $20 per year in rent. William Nassau Kennedy was the acting City Clerk and Registrar for the first election, and found that only 398 residents of the new City of Winnipeg met the qualifications to vote. With this election, Francis Evans Cornish became the first mayor of Winnipeg.

In 1887, civic suffrage was afforded to women in Winnipeg, 80 of whom would be eligible to vote in that year's civic election and 476 in the election of 1888.

=== Modern era ===
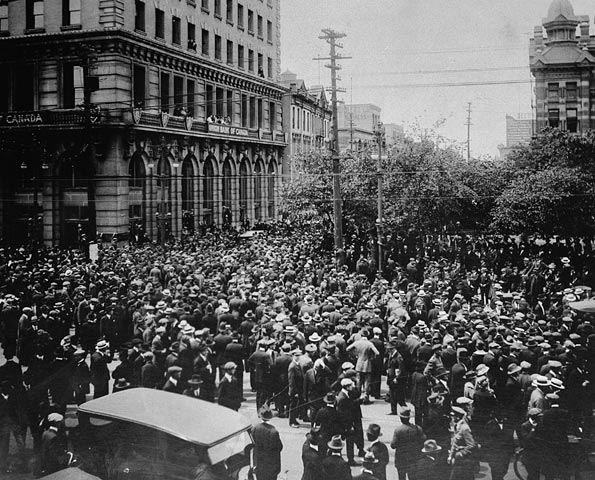
Crowd gathered outside the old City Hall on Main Street and William Avenue, during the 1919 general strike. Visible on the left are the Union Bank building and Leland Hotel.

Starting in 1900, in both provincial and federal elections, central Winnipeg elected politicians from the Labour Party.

While the norm in the city's early years was for local elected officials to be English Protestant males, others did win elections: Arni Frederickson (Ward 5, 1891) and Arni Eggertson (Ward 4, 1906) were Icelandic; Moses Finkelstein and Altar Skaletar (Ward 5, 1912) were Jewish; and Theodore Stefanik (Ward 5, 1911) was the first Ukrainian elected to City Council.

Women could not hold office in Winnipeg until 1916, after which Alice A. Holling in 1917 (Ward 7) became the first woman to run for Council. (Holling lost to Alexander McLennan, 693 to 358.) In December 1920, Jessie Kirk became the first woman elected to Council. Kirk served a two-year term on Council for Ward 2. She ran again in 1922, 1923, 1926, and 1934, but was defeated each time. Rose Alcin ran as a socialist candidate for the Winnipeg school board in 1920 and was elected with labour backing.

From 15 May to 28 June in 1919, Winnipeg was the site of a general strike. The strike included violent protests, several deaths at the hands of the Royal North-West Mounted Police, and the arrest of many strike leaders, who went on to be Winnipeg politicians. The unrest was adapted into a stage musical in 2005 called Strike!, itself being adapted into a 2019 film directed by Robert Adetuyi, titled Stand!. Though it was not chartered until 1932, the Co-operative Commonwealth Federation grew out of the post-WWI labour unrest, as well as out of the Depression. Its successor, the New Democratic Party, has enjoyed much support in Winnipeg since it founding in the early 1960s.

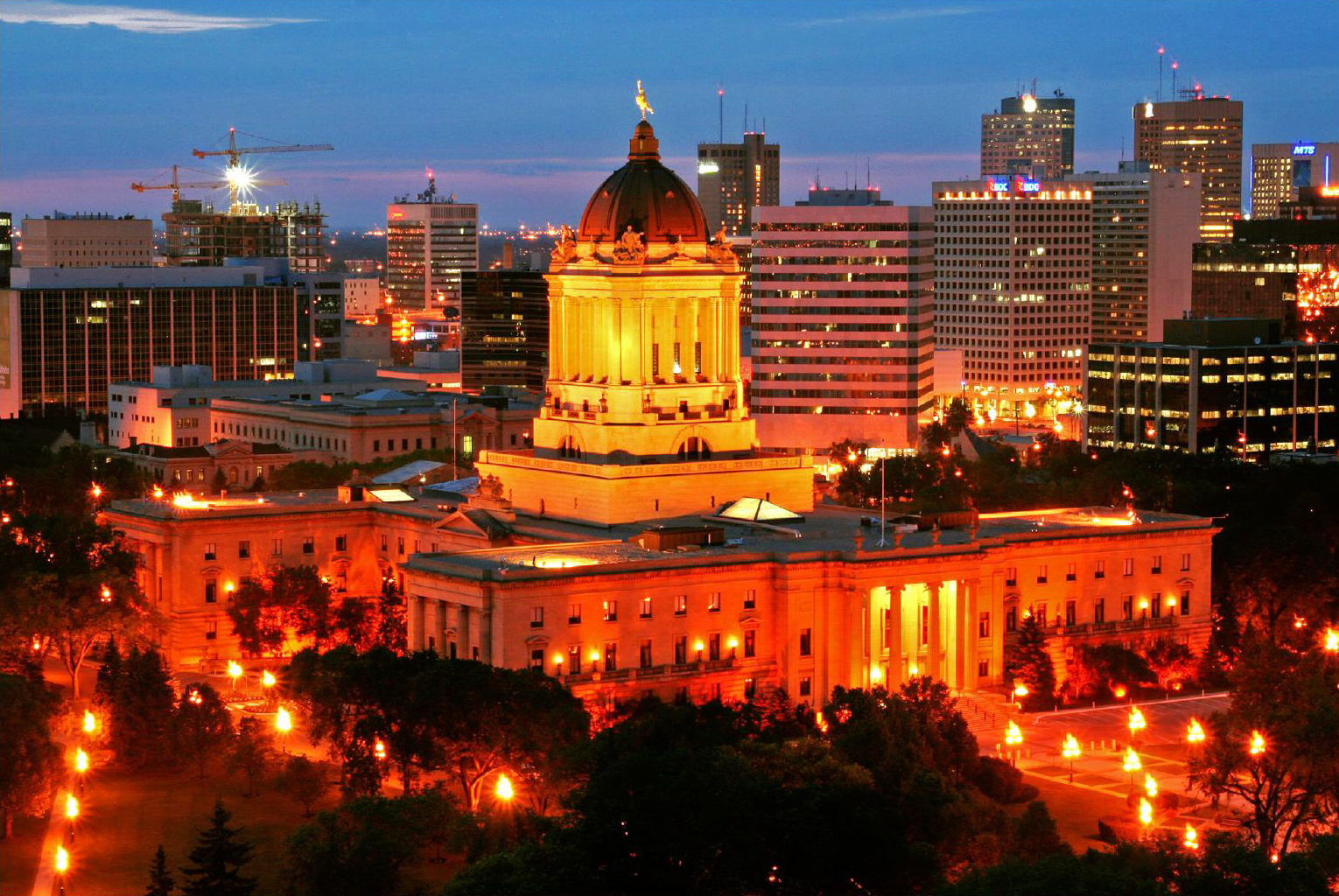
Manitoba Legislative Building

Following the general strike, Winnipeg city adopted a form of proportional representation for its city elections to elect councillors and school board trustees. The Manitoba government adopted the use of PR for election of Winnipeg MLAs starting in 1920. Liberals, Conservative and three types of labour men were elected in the first use of PR in Canada at the provincial level, in Manitoba's 1920 election. Socialist candidate Rose Alcin was elected to the Winnipeg school board in 1920. She was the first woman to serve in that body, and the use of PR also produced the election of the first woman MLA ( Edith Rogers) and the first woman city councillor in Manitoba's history (Jessie Kirk) that same year. The form of PR used was the single transferable voting election system. It was used for city elections until 1970 and for provincial elections until 1956.

The 1965 Winnipeg municipal election was held on October 27, 1965. On July 27, 1971, the City of Winnipeg became a unicity by amalgamating the Town of Tuxedo; the rural municipalities of Charleswood, Fort Garry, North Kildonan, Old Kildonan; the cities of East Kildonan, West Kildonan, St. Vital, Transcona, St. Boniface, St. James-Assiniboia; the old City of Winnipeg; and the Metropolitan Corporation of Greater Winnipeg.

The first election for the newly combined city was held on 6 October 1971. The City Council consisted of 50 councillors and one mayor. The use of STV was stopped, and the councillors were elected on the basis of one councillor per city ward while the mayor was elected by the city-at-large, all by the single-winner first past the post election system. The term of office was three years. The inaugural meeting of the new council took place on 4 January 1972. Since 50 councillors proved too unwieldy, the city wards were reduced to 29 in 1977. In 1992, the city wards were reduced even further to the present 15 and city councillors became full-time politicians.

On 22 June 2004, Sam Katz was elected as the first Jewish mayor of Winnipeg. He beat out prominent politicians Dan Vandal, Al Golden, and MaryAnn Mihychuk for the job by receiving 42.51% of the vote. This came after the resignation of Glen Murray as mayor of Winnipeg to run in the 2004 federal election. Katz was re-elected to a second term in the 2006 elections on 25 October 2006. After promising in his first election to run for only two terms, Katz ran for a third term in 2010. He was re-elected in the 2010 elections. Brian Bowman, the city's first Indigenous mayor, was elected as the 43rd Mayor of the City of Winnipeg in a landslide victory on 22 October 2014.

Winnipeg federal election results
Year	Liberal		Conservative		New Democratic		Green	
2021	38%	123,258	29%	91,977	27%	86,747	2%	5,418
2019	36%	119,825	33%	108,048	24%	78,745	5%	15,327

Winnipeg provincial election results
Year	PC		New Democratic		Liberal	
2019	36%	100,142	37%	100,386	19%	52,093
2016	43%	108,544	32%	79,063	17%	43,033

Winnipeg is represented in the Canadian House of Commons by eight Members of Parliament: as of 2019, the eight include four from the Liberal Party, two from the Conservative Party, and two from the New Democratic Party. Winnipeg's longest-serving Members of Parliament include J.S. Woodsworth (21 years), Stanley Knowles (38 years), David Orlikow (25 years), Bill Blaikie (almost 27 years and re-elected in the 2006 federal election), and Lloyd Axworthy (21 years).

== Winnipeg City Hall ==
Winnipeg City Hall
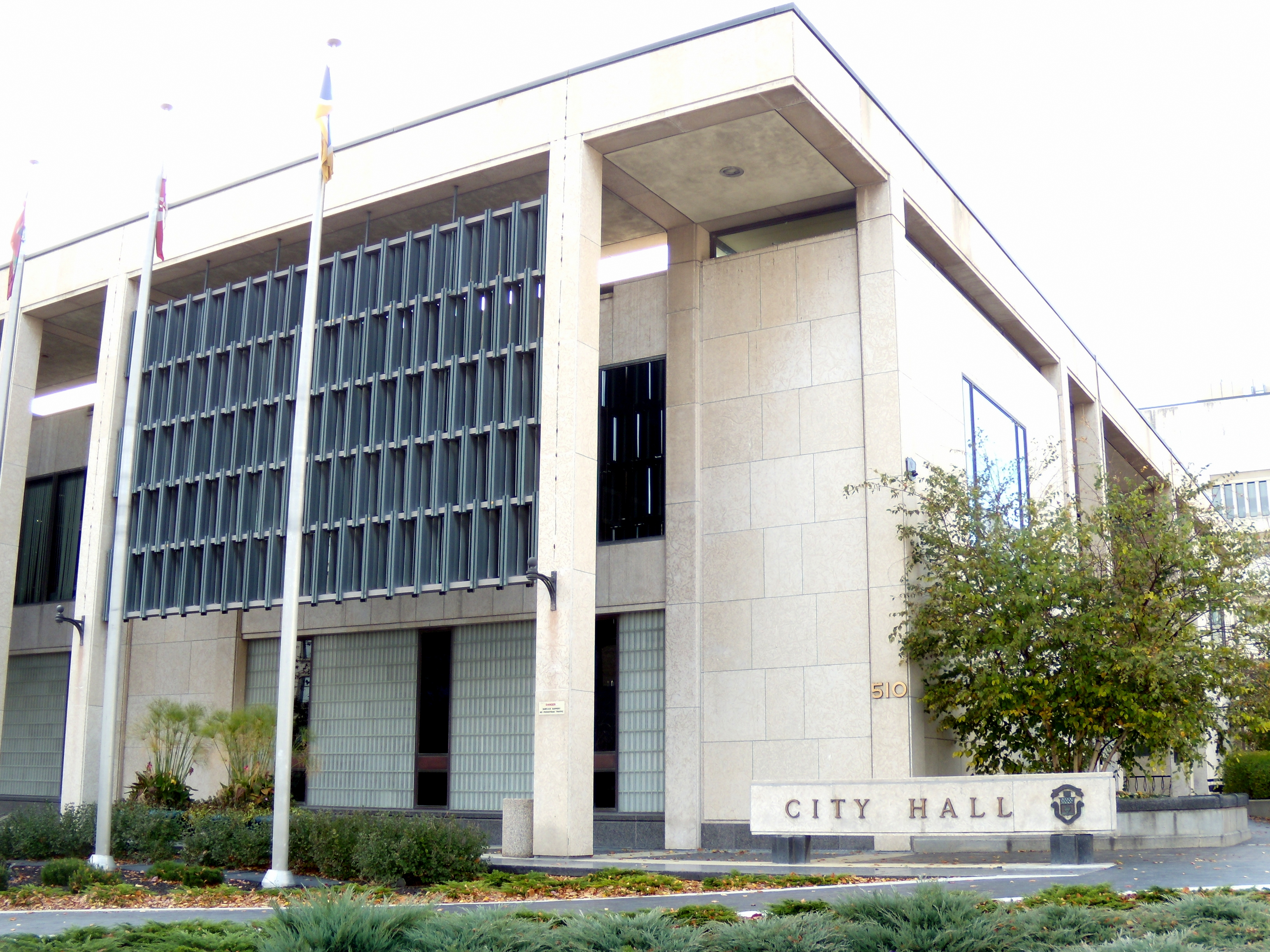
- The 3rd and current Winnipeg City Hall, erected as a part of the larger civic complex.
- Alternative names: Winnipeg Civic Centre

General information
- Architectural style: International Style (Modernist)
- Location: 510 Main Street, Winnipeg, MB
- Construction started: 1962–63
- Opened: 5 October 1964
- Renovated: 2015–17
- Cost: $8.2 million CAD (initial); $5.4 million (renovation)

Other information
- Public transit: Winnipeg Transit; FX2 FX3 F8 D16 43

Winnipeg City Hall is the municipal government complex and seat of municipal government of Winnipeg.

Built in 1962–63 and officially opened in 1964, the current City Hall of Winnipeg (also known as Winnipeg Civic Centre) is the third municipal administrative facilities to exist for the city. The Civic Centre includes four buildings that were completed in 1964:

- The two individual buildings of City Hall, along with a courtyard in between:
  - the Council Building, for Winnipeg City Council; and
  - the Susan A. Thompson Building, for administrative works (formerly called the Administrative Building)
- Public Safety Building — former Winnipeg Police headquarters and remand centre
- Civic Parkade

The Council and Administrative Buildings are joined by an underground corridor, which also connects the Civic Centre to the Manitoba Centennial Centre.

=== First Hall (1876–83) ===
During the initial two years of the city's incorporation in November 1873, city council meetings were held in various buildings in Winnipeg, including a furniture store.

Winnipeg's first City Hall (1876–83) was built for CA$40,000 in 1876, three years after the city was incorporated, and was located on Main Street between William and Market Avenues. Commencing in 1875, the building was constructed by Robert Dewar on top of a creek that was filled-in for that purpose.

The placing of the cornerstone of the city hall on 17 August 1875 was celebrated as a "grand civic holiday," with a large procession down Main Street to the ritual of laying the cornerstone. In the cornerstone, a casket (or time capsule) was deposited, containing coins, bills, newspapers, and photographs of the city.

The building was formally opened in March 1876 with a concert in aid of the Winnipeg General Hospital. During these early years, the hall served as a multi-use building. Developing cracks in its walls shortly after it was erected along with other structural flaws for which wooden poles had to be used to prop it up, the building was demolished in 1883.

=== Second Hall (1886–1962) ===
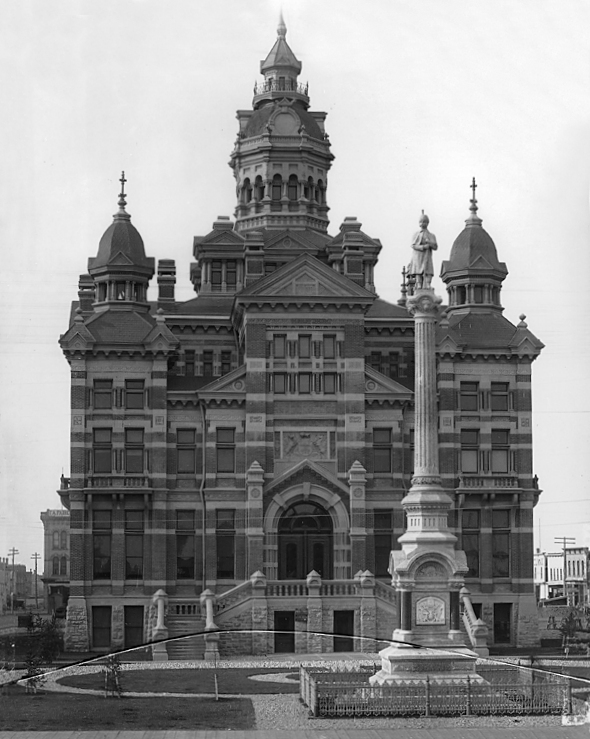
Winnipeg's 2nd City Hall and the Volunteer Monument, 1887

During the construction of the second hall (1884–86), the Mayor and City Council took up residence at 238 King Street in the newly built Coronation Block, which served as an interim "City Hall" between 1883 and 1886. (Eventually needing repairs and becoming a public safety hazard itself, the Coronation Block building was demolished in 2012.) In July 1884, the cornerstone for the second City Hall was laid. This new building, designed by architectural firm Barber and Barber, had a Victorian, Queen Anne Revival style.

The second Hall not only served the city government throughout its years, it also provided residence for the city's Board of Trade, the Historical and Scientific Society of Manitoba's library and reading room, and club rooms of the St. George's and St. Andrew's Societies. The building lasted just under 80 years, being demolished in 1962. While its replacement was initially planned for construction around 1913, the First World War would get in the way of these plans and not resurface until the late 1950s.

=== Third Hall (1964–present) ===
When planning for Winnipeg's third city hall, City Council considered various different sites in and around the core downtown area. However, they would eventually decide to remain in the Exchange District, the city's traditional central business district, adjacent to Old Market Square.

With a modernist, International style, the current City Hall was built in 1962–63 for $8.2 million—the style symbolizing upcoming centennial celebrations: the 1967 Canadian Centennial, the 1970 Manitoba centennial, and the 1973 Winnipeg centennial. The building's cornerstone was laid by Stephen Juba, Winnipeg's first “immigrant” mayor, and it was officially opened on 5 October 1964.

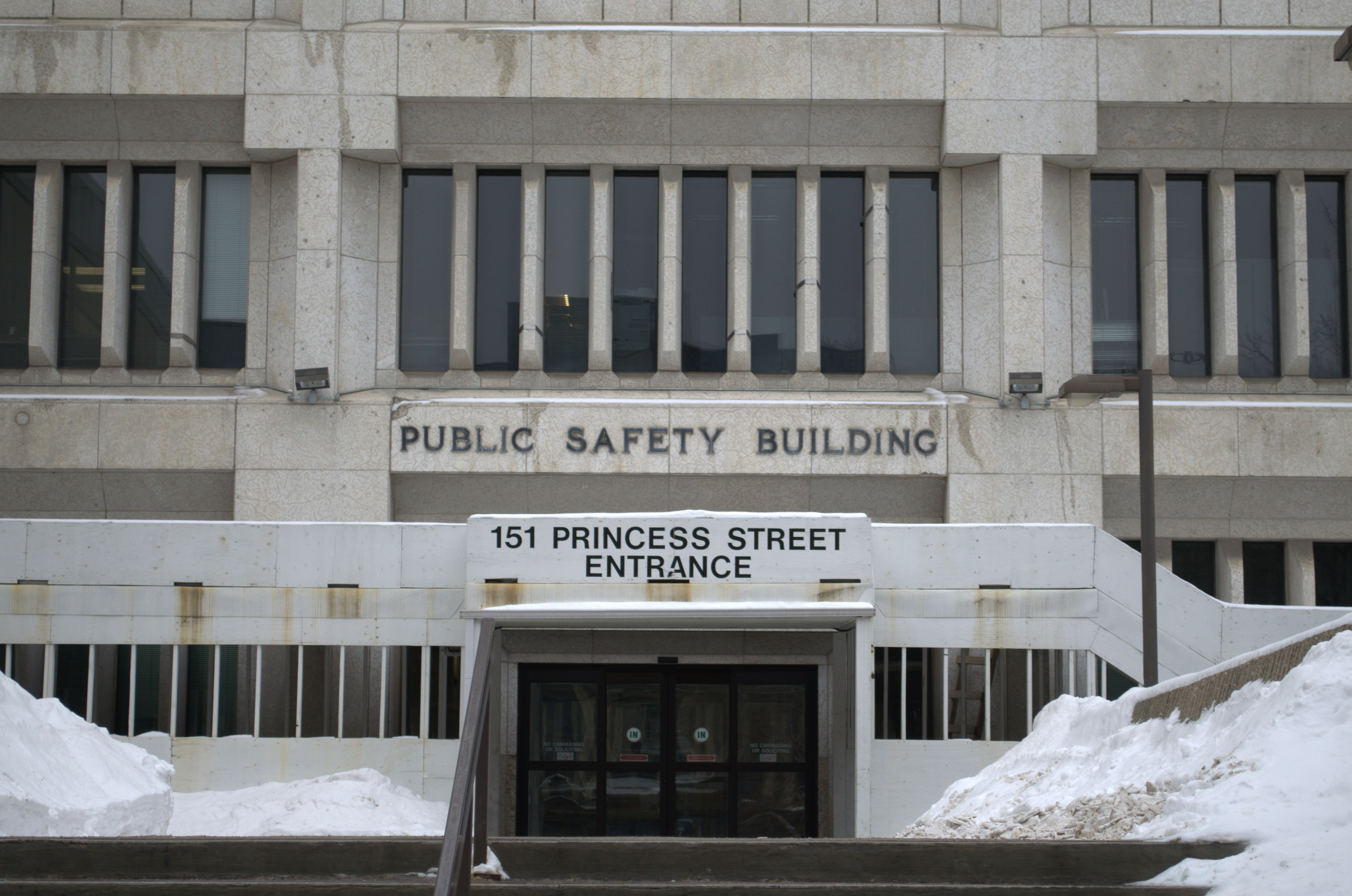
The Public Safety Building, 151 Princess Street entrance

The Civic Centre and the Manitoba Centennial Centre were connected by tunnels in 1967. From 2015 to 2017, the two buildings went through $5.4 million in renovations. Its administration building was renamed the Susan A. Thompson Building to recognize the titular first female mayor of Winnipeg, who held office from 1992 to 1998.

In the inner courtyard of City Hall, which was refurbished in 2003, are ceramic crests of each of the rural municipalities that were amalgamated into the City of Winnipeg in 1972. Commemorating the second City Hall is a Historic Winnipeg plaque found behind the City Hall sign near the northwest corner of the Council Building of the current City Hall.

The current Hall consists of two individual buildings: one for Winnipeg City Council and the other for administrative works, both joined by an underground corridor. Faced with Tyndall stone and Quebec Granite, the two buildings feature a bronze frame, screen, and hardware elements; with public-area interior wall finishes being limestone, granite, brick, and plaster.

The dedication to the City Hall, dedicated during the official opening ceremony for the City Hall on 5 October 1964, is inscribed into the west wall of the Council Building lobby. The Council Building, located on Princess Street, contains:

- Council Chamber
- Public Gallery, with a maximum capacity of 250 people
- Committee Rooms
- the Office of the Mayor
- Councillor offices
- the City Clerk's Department
- the Creative Services Branch of the Internal Services Department
- the Emergency Operations office

The Administration Building, (now called the Susan A. Thompson Building), is seven-stories high and houses:

- office of the Chief Administrative Officer
- office of the Corporate Services and Corporate Finance Departments
- conference rooms
- a public restaurant

== Law enforcement and military ==
Winnipeg is policed by the Winnipeg Police Service (WPS), which in 2012, had 1,442 police officers. Prior to 2014, Winnipeg Police were headquartered at the Public Safety Building in Winnipeg's Exchange District.

In February 1874, John S. Ingram became Winnipeg's first Chief of Police. Failing to control the city's rise in lawlessness, however, Ingram resigned in July 1875, and replaced by D. B. Murray.

In 2017, Winnipeg had 192 police officers per 100,000 people, being among the highest number of cops per capita among major Canadian cities (i.e., those with populations of 500,000 or more). However, this number would be down from 200 in 2015, a change consistent with an overall decline in police officers per capita across Canada, which saw a 1% drop last year and a 1% decline the year before.

The City of Winnipeg has five distinct police districts.

Winnipeg police districts
District	Region	Total area
District 1	City Centre	14.22 km^{2} (5.49 sq mi)
District 2	St. James / Assiniboia	65.11 km^{2} (25.14 sq mi)
District 3	Lord Selkirk West Kildonan	65.28 km^{2} (25.20 sq mi)
East District	St. Boniface St. Vital Elmwood East Kildonan North Kildonan Transcona	174.37 km^{2} (67.32 sq mi)
District 6	Assiniboine Park Fort Rouge Fort Garry	156.22 km^{2} (60.32 sq mi)

=== Military ===
Winnipeg-based units/groups belonging to the Canadian Armed Forces include:

Royal Canadian Navy

- HMCS Chippawa

Canadian Army

- 38 Canadian Brigade Group Headquarters
- 31 Engineer Squadron, 38 Combat Engineer Regiment
- The Fort Garry Horse
- 1 (Winnipeg) Squadron, 38 Signal Regiment
- The Royal Winnipeg Rifles
- The Queen's Own Cameron Highlanders of Canada
- 17 (Winnipeg) Service Company, 38 Service Battalion
- 17 Field Ambulance
- 13 Military Police Platoon
- 5 Platoon, 6 Intelligence Company

Royal Canadian Air Force

- 1 Canadian Air Division Headquarters
- 2 Canadian Air Division Headquarters
- 17 Wing Winnipeg CFB Winnipeg
- 402 Squadron
- 435 Transport and Rescue Squadron
- Canadian Forces School of Survival and Aeromedical Training
- RCAF W/C William G. Barker VC Aerospace College
- Royal Canadian Air Force Band
- 17 Wing Air Reserve Flight

== Crime ==
Between 2009 and 2019, overall crime in Winnipeg has dropped by 4%.

Crime rates in Winnipeg, 1991–2012 (Note: The populations used for the rates were based on trends on the every-5-year census report. For example, the population on the 2001 census was 619,544, and in 2006 it was 633,451. Therefore the population used for 2002 was 622,325 and for 2005 it was 630,670. The populations reported on the annual reports are much higher than the census reports, therefore likely inaccurate by an overestimation.) (Note: If there are two rates with a "/" between them, it is because there were two different recorded rates. The rate on the left is from the Annual Crime Report, where as on the right is from CrimeStat.)
Year	Homicide & Unlawful Death (Note: "Other violations causing death" only started showing records in the 2012 report (shows 2011 data as well), meaning from 1991 to 2010, only includes 1st and 2nd degree murders.)	Attempted Murder	Assault	SexualAssault	Robbery	Break &Enter	Theft (Note: Includes all thefts such as over $5,000, under $5,000, possession of stolen goods and fraud. It doesn't include motor vehicle theft however.)	Motor Vehicle Theft	Arson	Mischief
1991	2.6	7.0	670.2	129.6	212.5	2,059.5	4,575.1	393.2		
1992	1.9	6.0	789.1	146.1	244.8	1,883.8	4,943.8	390.9		
1993	2.4	5.8	974.9	122.4	237.5	2,003.9	4,434.7	1,055.1		
1994	2.8	4.4	956.2	132.0	278.7	2,110.4	4,523.7	1,272.6		
1995	2.6	5.5	859.0	106.9	298.6	1,625.9	4,226.3	1,275.2		
1996	4.5	3.9	1,150.2	79.7	303.5	1,596.7	4,071.0	1,349.9		
1997	3.6	3.1	1,116.5	83.4	321.3	1,567.9	3,352.4	1,460.5	25.5	1,851.8
1998	2.7	1.5	997.6	75.2	270.0	1,456.0	3,262.7	1,369.5	53.5	1,837.1
1999	2.3	1.3	918.6	74.1	291.8	1,296.9	3,232.5	1,405.9	75.1	2,051.7
2000	2.6	2.3	1,077.6	91.4	273.4	1,283.4	3,189.0	1,527.6	85.9	2,008.4
2001	2.9	2.7	1,042.5	95.9	292.8	1,210.6	3,391.8	1,721.1	78.8	2,352.2
2002	3.4	1.9	1,045.8	108.8	240.7	1,085.5	3,385.0	1,497.8	76.2	2,410.4
2003	2.9	1.6	951.8	114.1	257.8	1,219.3	4,030.4	1,621	88.1	2,785.4
2004	5.4	1.6	925.5	107.0	253.2	1,191.3	3,835.9	2,119.2	92.2	2,760.2
2005	4.0	1.9	965.3	106.6	291.1	1,142.0	3,381.5	1,877.4	50.4	3,100.8
2006	3.5	2.4	935.7	104.8	308.9	1,129.2	3,218.6	2,165.0	75.9	3,033.4
2007	4.2	4.2	781.1	89.4	302.1	1,085.1	2,569.9	1,919.5	28.9	2,786.9
2008	4.5	4.0	863.2	97.6	253.0	822.3	2,343.5	1,059.6	45.4	2,402.6
2009	4.6	2.6	953.4	105.7	346.7	870.4	2,301.0	692.7	61.5	2,264.1
2010	3.3	2.0	920.2	110.6	304.1	852.2	2,287.0	555.8	56.9	2,134.9
2011	6.8	0.8	849.9	108.6	262.8	712.6	1,890.5	341.5	69.3	1,832.8
2012	5.0	0.9	810.9	100.7	250.1 / 272.9	691.7 / 729.8	1,869.3	327.0 / 338.9	63.6	1,736.1

=== Violent crime ===
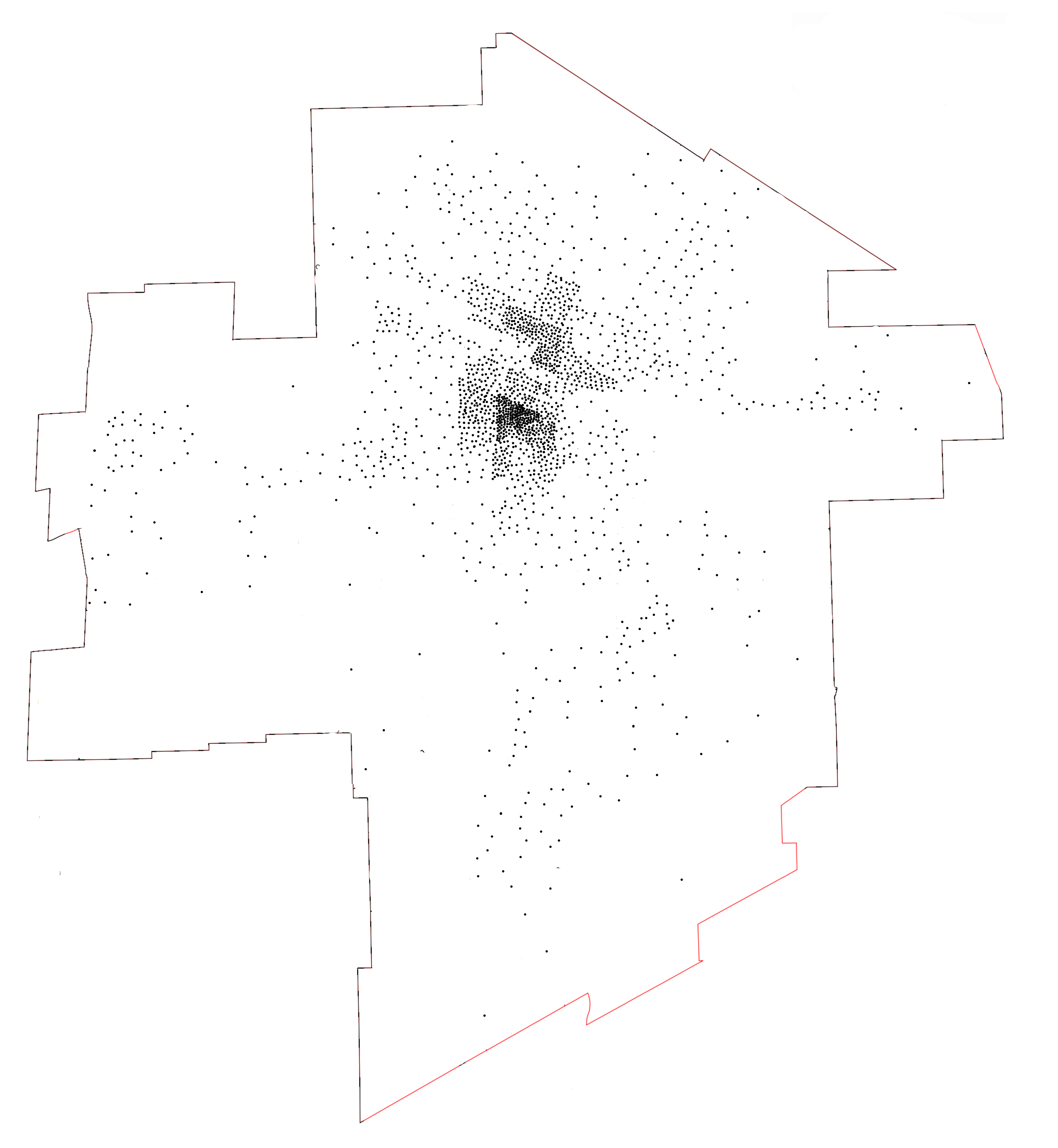
This map shows each robbery in Winnipeg (one dot per robbery) in 2012. There were 1,811 robberies that year.

In 2019, Winnipeg's Violent Crime Severity Index (VCSI) (Note: Violence crime, according to Winnipeg Police and the Criminal Code, includes abduction and kidnapping; aggravated assault; aggravated sexual assault; assault against a peace officer; assault with weapon or causing bodily harm; "commodification of sexual activity;"common assault and other assaults; criminal harassment; extortion; firearms offences (including use, discharge, point); indecent/harassing communications; homicide and attempted murder; robbery; uttering threats; sexual assault, including with a weapon; and other violent/sexual offences.) rating came to 173, against the national average of 82.44, ranking #13 out of a total 237.

The Winnipeg Transit system is a frequent place of violent crime including assaults on drivers and passengers, and the homicide of a transit driver in 2017.

The only rate that has increased is the homicide rate. From 1981 to 2012, Winnipeg had the highest murder rate among Canada's largest nine cities a total of sixteen times, with a rate of 6.2 per 100,000 residents. There were an additional 4 unlawful deaths, which would bring the rate to 6.8. This rate was around 4 times higher than the national rate (1.7 per capita). The next year, there were 34 known homicides in Winnipeg (5.1 per capita) with an addition 3 unlawful deaths (equating to a rate of 5.6 per 100,000 people), again being a few times higher than the national rate (1.6).

From 2018 to 2019, the Winnipeg Census Metropolitan Area had the largest VCSI increase (22) in the number of homicides in Canada overall. In November 2019, Winnipeg experienced an unprecedented 11 homicides in the span of 30 days. Two weeks before the end of 2019, Winnipeg broke its own record for the most homicides in a year, with 44 homicides. Of those 42, 36 were men or boys and six were women or girls; four were under age 18, with a total of 44 homicides in the year (a homicide rate of 6.2 per 100,000 people).

In 2020, gangs were a significant driving force of violence in Winnipeg—with 50% of all 110 shootings and 30% of all 43 homicides that year being gang related. By December that year, 86% of the homicide cases had been solved. Among the victims were more than 93 young Indigenous people (male and female) between the ages of 17 and 25 years old.

In 2021, the city nearly tied their homicide record with 43 homicides being reported in the year, along with and a record 186 fatal & non-fatal shootings throughout the city (a shooting rate of 24.8 shootings per 100,000 residents, higher than any other major city in Canada).

2022 was the deadliest year in the city's history with a record 54 homicides being reported, a 25.5% increase from the year before, giving the city a homicide rate of 7.2 per 100,000 residents, a rate which is comparable to modern-day Los Angeles, and the second highest homicide rate of all major cities in Canada, after Thunder Bay (13.7 per 100,000).

2023 saw a decrease in homicides with 46 being reported in the year, a 13.2% decrease from the year before, giving the city a homicide rate of around 6.1 per 100,000 people.

2024 saw another decrease in homicides with a reported 41 homicides in the year, giving the city a homicide rate of around 5.5 per 100,000 residents.

Violent crime, 2018–20
Offence	2020	2019	2018	Total 2018–20	3-year average
Common assault	3,152	2,990	3,124	9,266	3,089
Assault with weapon or causing bodily harm	2,112	1,807	1,948	5,867	1,956
Robbery	1,877	2,078	2,173	6,128	2,043
Uttering threats	1,051	1,104	991	3,146	1,049
Sexual assault (incl. aggravated) (Note: There were 2 cases of aggravated sexual assault in 2020; 4 in 2019; and 9 in 2018. This equates to 15 total offences in 3 years, with an average of 5.)	582	606	697	1,885	628
Assault against peace office	372	367	356	1,095	365
Aggravated assault	182	182	175	539	180
Other sexual offences	165	149	177	491	164
Firearms offences (use, discharge, point)	72	88	40	200	67
Homicide	44	45	18	107	36
Attempted murder	11	20	14	45	15
Sexual assault with a weapon	22	19	13	54	18
Other assaults	17	4	6	27	9
Total	9,659	9,459	9,732	28,850	740
Note: This is not a total of all violent crimes in Winnipeg, as some offences have been excluded.

Homicide rates in Winnipeg by neighbourhood, (Note: Only neighborhoods with over 1,000 people, and more than one homicide are accounted for in this table. There are over 25 other neighbourhoods with homicides, however they did not qualify.) 2009–12
Neighbourhood	Rate (per 100,000 people)	Homicides	Population
Daniel Mcintyre	33.4	13	9,750
William Whyte	48.3	12	6,220
North Point Douglas	123.6	11	2,225
St. John's	32.4	10	7,725
Broadway-Assiniboine	24.7	5	5,080
Centennial	56.2	5	2,225
Dufferin	48.3	5	2,090
Spence	23.5	4	4,260
Central Park	28.3	4	3,555
West Alexander	25.0	4	4,000
South Portage	40.4	3	1,860
The Maples	3.8	2	13,335
Chalmers	5.3	2	9,475
Melrose	39.3	2	1,275
West Broadway	9.4	2	5,325
Weston	8.7	2	5,810
River East	6.0	2	8,350
River-Osborne	10.3	2	4,800
Sargent Park	8.6	2	5,845
St. Matthews	8.7	2	5,795
Wolseley	6.6	2	7,610

=== Property and nonviolent crime ===
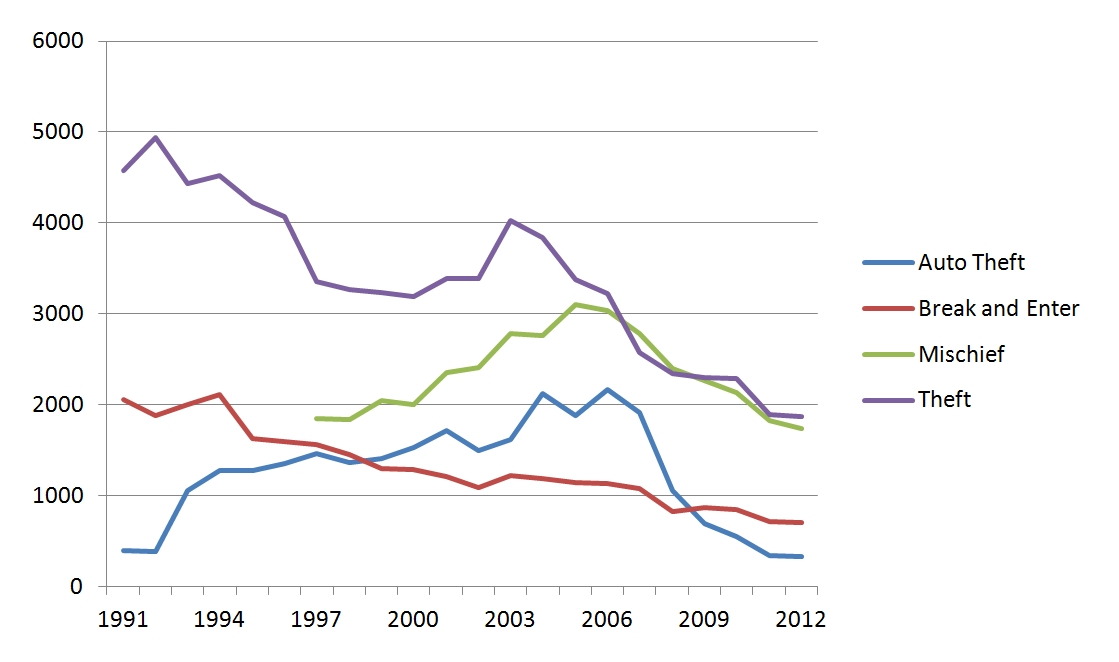
This graph shows the trends for Winnipeg's property crime, from 1991 to 2012

Drug-related offences in Canada are administered by the federal Controlled Drugs and Substances Act (CDSA). Criminal traffic violations are facilitated via the Criminal Code.

In 2019, in addition to a significant spike in homicides, violence, and child pornography, Winnipeg dealt with rising violent property crimes, exacerbated by a meth crisis. Contributing to that change was an increase in fraud, theft of $5,000 or under, and breaking & entering.

Property and nonviolent crime, 2020 (Note: Canada's Non-violent Crime Severity Index includes property and other non-violent Criminal Code offences, drug crime, other federal statutes and Criminal Code traffic offences.)
Property crime
Offence	2020	2019	2018
Theft ($5,000 or under)	17,205	20,684	16,084
Mischief	13,911	13,496	12,852
Breaking & Entering	5,409	6,276	5,641
Fraud	3,050	2,509	2,210
Motor Vehicle Theft	2,905	3,240	2,641
Possession of Stolen Property	599	715	633
Arson	354	282	398
Theft (over $5000)	216	245	265
Total	43,649	47,447	40,724
Criminal traffic offences
Offence	2020	2019	2018
Impaired Operation	308	380	443
Dangerous Operation	364	276	317
Total	672	656	760
Drug offences (CDSA)
Offence	2020	2019	2018
Trafficking, Production, Distribution, Import, Export	416	294	349
Possession	226	208	321
Cannabis trafficking or production	39	—	—
Cocaine trafficking or production	171	—	—
Total	852	502	670
Other crimes
Offence	2020	2019	2018
Cybercrime	—	1,040 (Note: The 2019 national rate per capita for cybercrime was 117.8.)	556
Hate Crime	—	41 (Note: The 2019 national rate per capita for hate crimes was 5.2.)	29
Administration of Justice violation	4,196	3,854	4,454
Offensive Weapons	882	849	762
Counterfeit Money (making, possessing, uttering)	623	152	82
Other Criminal Code Violations	218	247	303
Disturb the Peace	37	54	33
Child Pornography	30	24	35
Prostitution	1	—	4
Total	5,987	6,261	6,258

=== Crime severity index ===
From 2018 to 2019, the Winnipeg Census Metropolitan Area had the largest Violent Crime Severity Index (VCSI) increase (22) in the number of homicides in Canada overall. In 2019, Winnipeg also dealt with rising violent property crimes. Driving that change was an increase in homicide, fraud, shoplifting of $5,000 or under, as well as breaking and entering, and child pornography.

Winnipeg ranked #13 out of 237 on Canada's VCSI in 2019, with a rating of 173 (the national average was 82.44). Its overall Crime Severity Index (CSI) rating came to 125, against the national average of 75.01. With an increase of 12% from the previous year, Winnipeg therefore saw the third largest increase in the 2019 CSI, tied with Thunder Bay, Ontario, but behind Victoria (20%) and Kelowna (13%), BC.

Among municipalities of Manitoba, Winnipeg still fell behind Thompson at #1 (CSI: 366; VCSI: 570), Portage la Prairie at #3 (CSI: 263; VCSI: 316), and Selkirk at #7 (CSI: 193; VCSI: 231).

Crime severity index
Index	2015	2016	2017	2018	2019
Crime severity index	90.35	103.45	108.58	119.81	131.71
Violent crime severity index	125.98	145.38	155.29	162.40	173.96
Non-violent crime severity index	77.20	88.13	91.53	104.21	116.20

Youth crime, 2020
Crime	Actual incidents	Rate (incidents per 100,000)	National average
Youth Criminal Justice Act offences	152	20.17	13.01

CSI comparison, 2003–17
Crime Severity Index
City	2003	2004	2005	2006	2007	2008	2009	2010	2011	2012	2013	2014	2015	2016	2017
Winnipeg	165.49	170.83	163.93	166.09	150.73	125.82	137.52	117.65	103.55	98.23	83.84	81.12	89.64	102.37	106.93
Regina	221.85	229.09	205.96	196.57	187.00	164.61	143.67	133.18	124.12	117.36	106.05	103.08	109.73	125.76	111.89
Saskatoon	219.50	190.69	183.29	165.24	158.14	138.85	133.48	128.62	114.76	107.26	99.74	110.10	112.82	116.40	114.98
Calgary	102.98	98.55	97.01	96.29	91.80	84.92	80.78	76.39	65.34	61.15	60.99	60.67	79.11	77.47	81.76
Edmonton	141.52	144.32	141.01	129.75	128.64	122.69	114.74	101.81	87.02	84.49	85.41	87.90	102.58	106.51	112.34
Non-violent Crime Severity Index
City	2003	2004	2005	2006	2007	2008	2009	2010	2011	2012	2013	2014	2015	2016	2017
Winnipeg	162.66	167.89	154.67	157.17	139.04	110.79	116.86	98.49	81.63	79.72	70.05	68.08	76.59	87.21	89.92
Regina	232.24	244.95	213.78	192.01	188.71	161.97	138.91	125.99	124.86	119.56	105.06	102.74	109.91	125.01	114.27
Saskatoon	216.29	195.30	176.87	149.93	138.76	128.59	124.76	117.94	108.83	100.02	95.59	105.42	112.39	118.27	117.24
Calgary	106.97	102.59	97.88	96.86	90.88	83.11	77.87	74.69	63.49	60.82	60.24	59.32	81.20	82.10	84.52
Edmonton	147.60	154.35	148.34	135.11	128.90	119.52	113.47	99.71	80.42	80.17	83.18	85.44	101.45	107.83	113.99
Violent Crime Severity Index
City	2003	2004	2005	2006	2007	2008	2009	2010	2011	2012	2013	2014	2015	2016	2017
Winnipeg	172.86	178.47	188.03	189.27	181.16	164.92	191.24	167.48	163.23	148.53	121.26	116.50	124.99	143.86	153.53
Regina	194.82	187.86	185.63	208.41	182.55	171.47	156.03	151.86	121.38	110.63	108.16	103.41	108.59	127.01	104.54
Saskatoon	227.84	178.68	199.98	205.05	208.54	165.52	156.16	156.39	130.39	126.54	110.57	122.34	113.35	110.44	107.93
Calgary	92.61	88.04	94.76	94.80	94.19	89.63	88.36	80.82	70.05	61.70	62.69	64.04	72.92	64.09	73.54
Edmonton	125.69	118.24	121.95	115.80	127.96	130.95	118.04	107.26	104.67	95.88	91.05	94.18	105.09	102.13	106.99

=== Concentration of crime ===
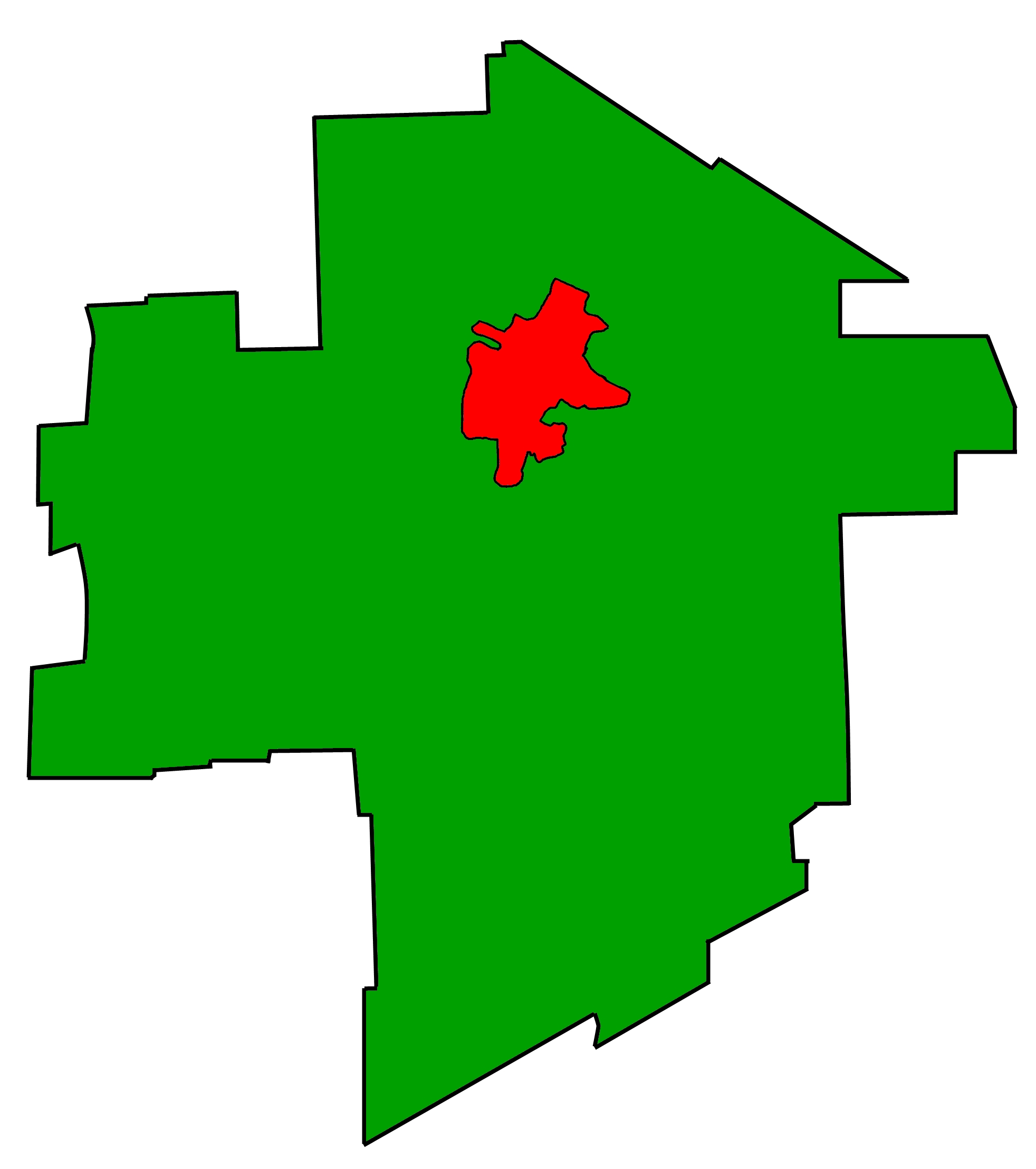
The red area is the geographic location of the cluster of 20 neighbourhoods in Winnipeg with the highest robbery rates

Despite high overall violent crime rates compared to other Canadian cities, crime in Winnipeg is very concentrated. For example, 80 of 234 neighbourhoods had not one robbery in 2012, and 32 others only had one robbery. However, there were 20 neighbourhoods (about 10% of neighbourhoods) that had higher robbery rates than the highest robbery rate in Toronto (Bay Street Corridor; 640 per 100,000 residents), such as Lord Selkirk Park with a rate of 4,395.6., or South Portage at 4,139.8.

The 20 neighbourhoods in Winnipeg with the highest robbery rates, all have boundaries that connect to each other, with a cumulative population of 54,255 in 2006: South Point Douglas, Logan – C.P.R., Lord Selkirk Park, South Portage, Portage – Ellice, Dufferin Industrial, Spence, Central Park, St. John's Park, William Whyte, West Alexander, North Point Douglas, Centennial, Colony, Chinatown, Dufferin, Daniel Mcintyre, St. John's, Portage & Main, and West Broadway (Note: Note: This list does not include the commercial areas Polo Park or Kensington and the Exchange District due to its residential development after 2006.) In 2012, with 918 robberies (1692.9 per capita), this geographical cluster is where the majority of violent crime happened in Winnipeg. 918 of the 1,812 (50.7%) robberies in the city occurred in this area, where only 8.7% of the cities total population lives. From 2009 to 2013, 95 of the 145 (65.5%) homicides in Winnipeg occurred in this smaller portion of the city, creating an average homicide rate of 35.0 per 100,000 residents, peaking at 57.1 in 2011. If one were subtract these areas from the city, the homicide rate average in Winnipeg would substantially lower at 1.8 per 100,000 people, and the robbery rate in the city is over 1,000% lower at 156.7.

The two highest rankings are South Point Douglas (11,304.3) and Logan-C.P.R. (6,333.3) but both have lower populations under 1,000 residents. Lord Selkirk Park and South Portage compare to some of the most dangerous neighbourhoods in the US, however no ranking is 100% certain as Canada and the USA have different classifications for crimes, (robbery is one though that both countries use the same), and there are also no recorded assault rates for Winnipeg neighbourhoods.

Crime in Winnipeg by neighborhood, 2011
Neighborhood	Population (2006)	Robberies	Rate	Auto Thefts	Rate	Burglaries (Break and Enter)	Rate
South Point Douglas	230	26	11304.3	9	3913	57	24782.6
Logan – C.P.R.	300	19	6333.3	6	2000	16	5333.3
Polo Park	285	15	5263.2	14	4912.3	9	3157.9
Lord Selkirk Park	1365	60	4395.6	22	1611.7	20	1465.2
South Portage	1860	77	4139.8	31	1666.7	61	3279.6
Portage – Ellice	1105	43	3891.4	10	905	12	1086
Exchange District	420	14	3333.3	11	2619	25	5952.4
Dufferin Industrial	125	3	2400	4	3200	8	6400
Spence	4260	90	2112.7	23	539.9	68	1596.2
Central Park	3555	72	2025.3	20	562.6	19	534.5
Kensington	255	5	1960.8	1	392.2	1	392.2
St. John's Park	575	11	1913	9	1565.2	7	1217.4
William Whyte	6220	117	1881	59	948.6	158	2540.2
West Alexander	4000	70	1750	54	1350	63	1575
North Point Douglas	2225	38	1707.9	33	1483.1	76	3415.7
Centennial	2225	36	1618	14	629.2	46	2067.4
Colony	715	10	1398.6	9	1258.7	24	3356.6
China Town	605	7	1157	0	0	0	0
Dufferin	2090	24	1148.3	19	909.1	58	2775.1
Daniel Mcintyre	9750	93	953.8	49	502.6	122	1251.3
St. John's	7725	67	867.3	86	1113.3	112	1449.8
West Broadway	5325	45	845.1	32	600.9	87	1633.8
Burrows Central	4805	36	749.2	49	1019.8	74	1540.1
Brooklands	2255	16	709.5	20	886.9	28	1241.7
River – Osborne	4880	34	696.7	16	327.9	56	1147.5
Mission Industrial	150	1	666.7	5	3333.3	13	8666.7
St. Matthews	5795	33	569.5	29	500.4	83	1432.3
Talbot – Grey	2295	12	522.9	9	392.2	12	522.9
Lavalee	1345	7	520.4	6	446.1	7	520.4
Varennes	1170	6	512.8	1	85.5	7	598.3
Airport	205	1	487.8	2	975.6	0	0
Broadway – Assiniboine	5080	24	472.4	14	275.6	26	511.8
Mcmillan	3420	14	409.4	15	438.6	33	964.9
Leila North	750	3	400	2	266.7	4	533.3
West Wolseley	260	1	384.6	3	1153.8	3	1153.8
Chalmers	9475	36	379.9	75	791.6	114	1203.2
Burrows – Keewatin	2760	10	362.3	14	507.2	28	1014.5
Fairfield Park	295	1	339	1	339	11	3728.8
Central St. Boniface	6215	21	337.9	19	305.7	52	836.7
St. Norbert	1290	4	310.1	0	0	5	387.6
Weston	5810	18	309.8	42	722.9	77	1325.3
Shaughnessy Park	2285	7	306.3	14	612.7	39	1706.8
Riverview	4350	13	298.9	15	344.8	32	735.6
Garden City	5760	17	295.1	25	434	38	659.7
North St. Boniface	1775	5	281.7	9	507	22	1239.4
King Edward	5340	15	280.9	28	524.3	57	1067.4
Glendale	1070	3	280.4	4	373.8	3	280.4
Armstrong Point	360	1	277.8	1	277.8	4	1111.1
Rivergrove	1095	3	274	4	365.3	18	1643.8
Glenelm	2195	6	273.3	10	455.6	34	1549
Earl Grey	4410	12	272.1	13	294.8	45	1020.4
Victoria West	2600	7	269.2	12	461.5	21	807.7
Crestview	8855	22	248.4	28	316.2	33	372.7
Worthington	5425	13	239.6	9	165.9	22	405.5
Melrose	1275	3	235.3	7	549	7	549
Munroe West	3020	7	231.8	21	695.4	34	1125.8
Dufresne	435	1	229.9	6	1379.3	2	459.8
Agassiz	435	1	229.9	0	0	0	0
Norwood East	4125	9	218.2	13	315.2	60	1454.5
Roslyn	4145	9	217.1	5	120.6	13	313.6
Vialoux	950	2	210.5	2	210.5	2	210.5
Rossmere – B	3885	8	205.9	8	205.9	44	1132.6
Leila – Mcphillips Triangle	3040	6	197.4	10	328.9	16	526.3
Inkster – Faraday	4135	8	193.5	39	943.2	39	943.2
Robertson	4205	8	190.2	20	475.6	62	1474.4
Grant Park	2700	5	185.2	8	296.3	21	777.8
Wolseley	7610	14	184	30	394.2	82	1077.5
Elm Park	1710	3	175.4	0	0	13	760.2
Rossmere – A	13350	22	164.8	41	307.1	78	584.3
Lord Roberts	4955	8	161.5	17	343.1	32	645.8
Kingston Crescent	620	1	161.3	1	161.3	0	0
East Elmwood	3110	5	160.8	11	353.7	21	675.2
Sargent Park	5845	9	154	30	513.3	69	1180.5
Pulberry	4560	7	153.5	6	131.6	17	372.8
Montcalm	4620	7	151.5	6	129.9	10	216.5
Minto	5360	8	149.3	20	373.1	75	1399.3
Fort Richmond	11610	17	146.4	23	198.1	34	292.9
The Maples	13335	19	142.5	47	352.5	61	457.4
Edgeland	1420	2	140.8	0	0	6	422.5
Margaret Park	2155	3	139.2	16	742.5	7	324.8
Niakwa Park	745	1	134.2	1	134.2	0	0
Jefferson	8280	10	120.8	54	652.2	54	652.2
Rockwood	4205	5	118.9	6	142.7	55	1308
Silver Heights	5100	6	117.6	8	156.9	20	392.2
Varsity View	2600	3	115.4	4	153.8	3	115.4
Heritage Park	5500	6	109.1	19	345.5	30	545.5
Pembina Strip	2815	3	106.6	6	213.1	8	284.2
Munroe East	8460	9	106.4	22	260	28	331
Deer Lodge	3785	4	105.7	9	237.8	30	792.6
Westdale	4770	5	104.8	16	335.4	21	440.3
Seven Oaks	2870	3	104.5	31	1080.1	22	766.6
Point Road	1945	2	102.8	2	102.8	10	514.1
Templeton – Sinclair	5160	5	96.9	23	445.7	22	426.4
Bruce Park	2165	2	92.4	2	92.4	14	646.7
Minnetonka	4340	4	92.2	4	92.2	26	599.1
Southdale	6710	6	89.4	9	134.1	20	298.1
Tyndall Park	12775	11	86.1	37	289.6	72	563.6
Richmond West	8195	7	85.4	14	170.8	12	146.4
Valley Gardens	8250	7	84.8	19	230.3	36	436.4
Beaumont	2360	2	84.7	3	127.1	8	339
Windsor Park	9665	8	82.8	22	227.6	34	351.8
Kildonan Drive	4855	4	82.4	5	103	33	679.7
Glenwood	3650	3	82.2	9	246.6	34	931.5
Luxton	2565	2	78	10	389.9	10	389.9
Mynarski	1350	1	74.1	3	222.2	9	666.7
Crescentwood	2705	2	73.9	6	221.8	25	924.2
River East	8350	6	71.9	12	143.7	46	550.9
Westwood	7120	5	70.2	6	84.3	29	407.3
Wellington Crescent	1605	1	62.3	2	124.6	16	996.9
Sturgeon Creek	3215	2	62.2	4	124.4	18	559.9
St. Vital Perimeter South	1680	1	59.5	3	178.6	8	476.2
Mandalay West	5085	3	59	10	196.7	35	688.3
Alpine Place	3515	2	56.9	7	199.1	3	85.3
River Park South	10820	6	55.5	10	92.4	40	369.7
North River Heights	5660	3	53	4	70.7	65	1148.4
Dakota Crossing	10265	5	48.7	9	87.7	35	341
Betsworth	4220	2	47.4	4	94.8	10	237
Amber Trails	2135	1	46.8	8	374.7	31	1452
Maybank	2335	1	42.8	4	171.3	6	257
Riverbend	4715	2	42.4	6	127.3	17	360.6
Crescent Park	2520	1	39.7	2	79.4	6	238.1
Eric Coy	2540	1	39.4	2	78.7	9	354.3
Meadows	5165	2	38.7	6	116.2	8	154.9
Mathers	2605	1	38.4	9	345.5	12	460.7
Buchanan	2820	1	35.5	9	319.1	8	283.7
Valhalla	2905	1	34.4	1	34.4	6	206.5
Meadowood	5970	2	33.5	18	301.5	26	435.5
Norwood West	3055	1	32.7	12	392.8	16	523.7
Central River Heights	3145	1	31.8	8	254.4	49	1558
Inkster Gardens	3175	1	31.5	9	283.5	15	472.4
Radisson	3355	1	29.8	4	119.2	9	268.3
Island Lakes	6750	2	29.6	3	44.4	14	207.4
Whyte Ridge	7565	2	26.4	4	52.9	13	171.8
Elmhurst	4705	1	21.3	2	42.5	13	276.3
Waverley Heights	5195	1	19.2	10	192.5	19	365.7
Canterbury Park	5410	1	18.5	9	166.4	29	536
Booth	5485	1	18.2	10	182.3	22	401.1
Linden Woods	9550	1	10.5	3	31.4	21	219.9
Tissot	135	0	0	2	1481.5	3	2222.2
Holden	145	0	0	2	1379.3	1	689.7
Ridgewood South	170	0	0	2	1176.5	0	0
Rosser – Old Kildonan	220	0	0	2	909.1	6	2727.3
Stock Yards	415	0	0	3	722.9	3	722.9
Archwood	780	0	0	4	512.8	4	512.8
Maginot	1585	0	0	8	504.7	6	378.5
Wilkes South	595	0	0	3	504.2	3	504.2
Wildwood	1095	0	0	5	456.6	4	365.3
Ebby – Wentworth	720	0	0	3	416.7	15	2083.3
Birchwood	1890	0	0	6	317.5	5	264.6
Peguis	320	0	0	1	312.5	2	625
J.B. Mitchell	2095	0	0	6	286.4	17	811.5
Transcona South	720	0	0	2	277.8	2	277.8
Mission Gardens	3590	0	0	9	250.7	28	779.9
St. George	2530	0	0	6	237.2	31	1225.3
Grassie	2165	0	0	5	230.9	21	970
Kern Park	1735	0	0	4	230.5	8	461.1
Sir John Franklin	2320	0	0	5	215.5	38	1637.9
Springfield North	5245	0	0	11	209.7	22	419.4
Eaglemere	1460	0	0	3	205.5	2	137
Springfield South	1555	0	0	3	192.9	3	192.9
Linden Ridge	1080	0	0	2	185.2	4	370.4
Parc La Salle	2165	0	0	4	184.8	9	415.7
Kirkfield	2770	0	0	5	180.5	15	541.5
Norberry	1295	0	0	2	154.4	11	849.4
Kildare – Redonda	6490	0	0	9	138.7	28	431.4
Marlton	775	0	0	1	129	3	387.1
Old Tuxedo	860	0	0	1	116.3	12	1395.3
South Tuxedo	3790	0	0	4	105.5	15	395.8
Niakwa Place	2385	0	0	2	83.9	7	293.5
South River Heights	2585	0	0	2	77.4	13	502.9
Vista	1385	0	0	1	72.2	4	288.8
Royalwood	2840	0	0	2	70.4	8	281.7
River West Park	1445	0	0	1	69.2	2	138.4
Southboine	1505	0	0	1	66.4	2	132.9
Richmond Lakes	1790	0	0	1	55.9	1	55.9
Tuxedo	2415	0	0	1	41.4	12	496.9
Brockville	705	0	0	0	0	8	1134.8
Cloutier Drive	205	0	0	0	0	0	0
Jameswood	1250	0	0	0	0	2	160
Kil-Cona Park	360	0	0	0	0	3	833.3
Normand Park	700	0	0	0	0	3	428.6
Ridgedale	840	0	0	0	0	4	476.2
Roblin Park	980	0	0	0	0	0	0
Southland Park	1235	0	0	0	0	5	404.9
Victoria Crescent	615	0	0	0	0	1	162.6
Woodhaven	885	0	0	0	0	2	226
Assiniboia Downs	N/A	0		3		1	
Assiniboine Park	N/A	0		1		2	
Bridgewater Centre	N/A	0		0		0	
Bridgewater Forest	N/A	0		5		10	
Bridgewater Lakes	N/A	0		0		11	
Bridgewater Trails	N/A	0		0		0	
Buffalo	N/A	0		2		3	
Chevrier	N/A	0		4		6	
Civic Centre	N/A	3		2		14	
Dugald	N/A	0		1		4	
Griffin	N/A	0		1		1	
Inkster Industrial Park	N/A	5		11		15	
Kildonan Crossing	N/A	4		1		0	
Kildonan Park	N/A	0		0		0	
La Barriere	N/A	0		0		0	
Maple Grove Park	N/A	0		0		0	
McCleod Industrial	N/A	1		4		4	
Murray Industrial Park	N/A	0		0		0	
North Inkster Industrial	N/A	0		3		4	
North Transcona Yards	N/A	0		1		1	
Oak Point Highway	N/A	0		9		13	
Omand's Creek Industrial	N/A	0		5		6	
Pacific Industrial	N/A	4		3		6	
Parker	N/A	0		0		2	
Perrault	N/A	0		0		1	
Portage and Main	N/A	10		1		3	
Regent	N/A	16		19		17	
Sage Creek	N/A	1		2		15	
Saskatchewan North	N/A	0		0		0	
South Pointe	N/A	0		1		6	
St. Boniface Industrial Park	N/A	0		5		2	
St. James Industrial	N/A	17		41		27	
St. Vital Centre	N/A	4		8		3	
Symington Yards	N/A	0		1		5	
The Forks	N/A	10		6		4	
The Mint	N/A	0		0		0	
Transcona North	N/A	0		0		0	
Transcona Yards	N/A	2		0		10	
Trappistes	N/A	1		0		0	
Turnbull Drive	N/A	0		0		0	
Tyne-Tees	N/A	3		3		17	
University	N/A	0		1		3	
Waverly West B	N/A	0		0		0	
Waverly West D	N/A	0		0		0	
West Fort Garry Industrial	N/A	0		7		5	
West Kildonan Industrial	N/A	1		0		0	
West Perimeter	N/A	0		0		0	
Weston Shops	N/A	1		4		6	

==== Crime by neighborhood (2017–2021) ====
The table below shows the crime rates of various crimes of each population area of Winnipeg. The crime data spans 5 years from the year 2017 to the year 2021. The rates are crimes per 100,000 residents per year. For more narrow and specific data, there are two more tables below that show the crime rates for each individual neighborhood.

Crime Rates per 100,000 people in Winnipeg Areas, 2017–2021
Area	Pop.	Homicide	Rate (Note: Rate per 100,000 people per year: Figure is calculated by dividing the total incidences of a crime by the neighborhood population, then multiplying by 100,000, and then dividing by 5, as the data spans 5 years)	Robbery	Rate	Agr. Aslt. (Note: Aggravated assault: Includes assaults which cause bodily harm or utilize weapons; includes the following categories given on Winnipeg CrimeMaps: aggravated assault, aggravated sexual assault, assault against peace officer, assault with weapon or causing bodily harm, attempted murder, firearms offences, sexual assault with a weapon.)	Rate	Cmn. Aslt (Note: Common assault: Excludes assaults which cause bodily harm or utilize weapons; includes the following categories given on Winnipeg CrimeMaps: assault against peace officer, common assault, other assaults, sexual assault.)	Rate	Utt. Threat (Note: Abbreviated from: uttering threats)	Rate	Property	Rate
North End	12,060	44	73.0	1,217	2,018.2	1,800	2,985.1	1,993	3,305.1	511	847.4	9,427	15,633.5
Central	11,625	29	49.9	1,052	1,809.9	1,803	3,101.9	2,639	4,540.2	518	891.2	11,986	20,621.1
West Central	20,905	33	31.6	1,251	1,196.8	1,538	1,471.4	2,043	1,954.6	366	350.2	12,928	12,368.3
South West End	13,185	13	19.7	295	447.5	355	538.5	688	1,043.6	153	232.1	6,928	10,508.9
St. John's	11,435	11	19.2	446	780.1	592	1,035.4	853	1,491.9	194	339.3	5,227	9,142.1
Downtown	8,995	8	17.8	732	1,627.6	812	1,805.4	1,824	4,055.6	358	796.0	12,379	27,524.2
Osborne-Corydon	12,745	8	12.6	221	346.8	212	332.7	395	619.9	99	155.4	5,715	8,968.2
East Inkster	7,660	4	10.4	95	248.0	155	404.7	290	757.2	62	161.9	2,352	6,141.0
Burrows	14,930	4	5.4	291	389.8	243	325.5	372	498.3	113	151.4	4,667	6,251.8
Elmwood	20,570	5	4.9	351	341.3	439	426.8	830	807.0	239	232.4	7,532	7,323.3
Weston	9,055	2	4.4	271	598.6	361	797.3	533	1,177.3	116	256.2	4,219	9,318.6
Fort Rouge East	9,235	2	4.3	74	160.3	76	164.6	178	385.5	58	125.6	2,253	4,879.3
Kirkfield Park	10,920	2	3.7	37	67.8	44	80.6	127	232.6	44	80.6	1,555	2,848.0
West Inkster	17,145	3	3.5	97	113.2	71	82.8	165	192.5	53	61.8	3,808	4,442.1
Fort Garry	13,635	2	2.9	111	162.8	193	283.1	290	425.4	81	118.8	4,410	6,468.6
Fort Rouge West	14,740	2	2.7	164	222.5	128	173.7	234	317.5	91	123.5	6,077	8,245.6
North Main	7,885	1	2.5	5	12.7	11	27.9	20	50.7	9	22.8	231	585.9
North Kildonan	16,735	2	2.4	55	65.7	68	81.3	147	175.7	59	70.5	2,101	2,510.9
Old Kildonan	34,010	4	2.4	219	128.8	223	131.1	533	313.4	187	110.0	6,403	3,765.4
Fort Richmond	17,395	2	2.3	161	185.1	149	171.3	352	404.7	107	123.0	3,067	3,526.3
South St. Vital	11,410	1	1.8	129	226.1	81	142.0	206	361.1	71	124.5	3,183	5,579.3
Sargant-Minto	11,900	1	1.7	118	198.3	104	174.8	233	391.6	72	121.0	4,916	8,262.2
East St. James	12,110	1	1.7	143	236.2	97	160.2	273	450.9	69	114.0	3,076	5,080.1
East St. Boniface	13,015	1	1.5	54	83.0	66	101.4	180	276.6	49	75.3	1,929	2,964.3
East Seine	27,235	2	1.5	39	28.6	52	38.2	114	83.7	54	39.7	2,692	1,976.9
Waverly West	28,865	2	1.4	90	62.4	108	74.8	192	133.0	89	61.7	4,229	2,930.2
West St. James	15,055	1	1.3	56	74.4	104	138.2	255	338.8	72	95.6	2,718	3,610.8
Suburban Kildonan	16,605	1	1.2	71	85.5	106	127.7	195	234.9	72	86.7	2,747	3,308.6
Assiniboia	20,150	1	1.0	187	185.6	127	126.1	348	345.4	117	116.1	3,950	3,920.6
Charleswood	24,990	1	0.8	53	42.4	104	83.2	237	189.7	84	67.2	2,677	2,142.5
North St. Vital	27,170	1	0.7	194	142.8	212	156.1	485	357.0	112	82.4	6,159	4,533.7
East Kildonan	30,710	1	0.7	267	173.9	322	209.7	592	385.5	202	131.6	5,774	3,760.3
River Heights	20,650	0	0.0	63	61.0	50	48.4	163	157.9	30	29.1	6,569	6,362.2
Tuxedo	7,855	0	0.0	43	109.5	45	114.6	200	509.2	66	168.0	1,498	3,814.1
Fort Whyte	20,045	0	0.0	41	40.9	23	22.9	73	72.8	49	48.9	2,680	2,674.0
Transcona	35,545	0	0.0	268	150.8	229	128.9	562	316.2	186	104.7	8,605	4,841.7
St. Norbert	5,530	0	0.0	9	32.5	23	83.2	60	217.0	17	61.5	663	2,397.8
Dakota	27,205	0	0.0	32	23.5	27	19.8	111	81.6	49	36.0	2,102	1,545.3
Garden City	12,265	0	0.0	145	236.4	66	107.6	208	339.2	73	119.0	4,205	6,856.9
West Kildonan	14,195	0	0.0	131	184.6	189	266.3	535	753.8	115	162.0	3,477	4,898.9
Dugald	1,520	0	0.0	7	92.1	6	78.9	23	302.6	10	131.6	312	4,105.3
St. Boniface	16,395	0	0.0	266	324.5	233	284.2	494	602.6	150	183.0	7,761	9,467.5
Winnipeg	727,426 (Note: Note that the populations of each area added does not equal the population of Winnipeg here. This is because the areas use the 2016 census, while the population here is an average of the 2016 and 2021 census.)	189	5.2	9,958	273.8	11,797	324.3	20,895	574.5	5,368	147.6	206,527	5,678.3

The table below features all of the majorly residential neighborhoods of Winnipeg. It excludes neighborhoods that are majorly or entirely commercial, like Polo Park, Regent, Kildonan Crossing and the vast majority of Downtown. It also excludes neighborhoods that are majorly or entirely industrial, like St. James Industrial, Tuxedo Industrials and South Point Douglas. Finally, it also excludes neighborhoods that are majorly or entirely parks, like Kildonan Park and Assiniboine Park, though just because a neighborhood has "park" in its name does not mean the neighborhood is actually majorly a park in the same sense that just because a neighborhood has "lake" (i.e.: Island Lakes) in its name or "forest" (i.e.: Bridgewater Forest) in its name does not actually mean it's majorly a lake or a forest.

Some neighborhoods here are marked as being residential-commercial (res./com.), and this refers to the fact that some residential neighborhoods also have a large commercial or industrial area forming part of them. The consequence of this is that they will have somewhat inflated crime rates compared to typical residential neighborhoods because commercial and industrial zones are non-residential and thus these non-residential establishments can also be victims to crimes like robbery and theft, so essentially is extra crime occurring in non-residential areas of the neighborhoods that don't necessarily have any effect on the residential parts.

Crime Rates per 100,000 people in Winnipeg Residential Neighborhoods, 2017–2021
Type	Area	Neighborhood	Pop.	Homicide	Rate	Robbery	Rate	Agr. Aslt.	Rate	Cmn. Aslt	Rate	Utt. Threat	Rate	Property	Rate
Residential	Burrows	Burrows Central	5,415	4	14.8	167	616.8	118	435.8	198	731.3	38	140.4	1,900	7,017.5
Residential	North End	Dufferin	2,255	7	62.1	134	1,188.5	245	2,172.9	303	2,687.4	69	612.0	1,469	13,028.8
Residential	Burrows	Inkster-Faraday	4,545	0	0.0	82	360.8	96	422.4	129	567.7	54	237.6	1,556	6,847.1
Residential	North End	Lord Selkirk Park	1,520	5	65.8	310	4,078.9	340	4,473.7	329	4,328.9	86	1,131.6	1,399	18,407.9
Residential	St. John's	Luxton	2,575	0	0.0	45	349.5	36	279.6	63	489.3	20	155.3	749	5,817.5
Residential	North End	North Point Douglas	2,025	4	39.5	145	1,432.1	270	2,666.7	322	3,180.2	80	790.1	1,913	18,893.8
Residential	Burrows	Robertson	4,970	0	0.0	42	169.0	29	116.7	45	181.1	21	84.5	1,211	4,873.2
Residential	St. John's	St. John's	8,330	11	26.4	347	833.1	517	1,241.3	721	1,731.1	157	377.0	4,028	9,671.1
Residential	St. John's	St. John's Park	530	0	0.0	54	2,037.7	39	1,471.7	69	2,603.8	17	641.5	450	16,981.1
Residential	North End	William Whyte	6,260	28	89.5	610	1,948.9	932	2,977.6	1,029	3,287.5	272	869.0	4,333	13,843.5
Residential	Central	Centennial	2,830	10	70.7	169	1,194.3	435	3,074.2	517	3,653.7	88	621.9	2,109	14,904.6
Residential	Central	Central Park	3,775	2	10.6	278	1,472.8	412	2,182.8	537	2,845.0	110	582.8	2,678	14,188.1
Residential	Central	West Alexander	3,970	3	15.1	393	1,979.8	541	2,725.4	844	4,251.9	154	775.8	4,653	23,440.8
Residential	Downtown	Broadway-Assiniboine	5,270	1	3.8	85	322.6	106	402.3	224	850.1	36	136.6	2,024	7,681.2
Residential	South West End	Armstrong Point	370	1	54.1	3	162.2	0	0.0	8	432.4	1	54.1	138	7,459.5
Residential	West Central	Colony	645	1	31.0	62	1,922.5	63	1,953.5	143	4,434.1	23	713.2	1,072	33,240.3
Residential	West Central	Daniel McIntyre	10,075	14	27.8	584	1,159.3	637	1,264.5	790	1,568.2	125	248.1	4,436	8,806.0
Residential	Sargent-Minto	Minto	5,720	0	0.0	70	244.8	52	181.8	112	391.6	37	129.4	2,469	8,632.9
Residential	Sargent-Minto	Sargent Park	6,180	1	3.2	48	155.3	52	168.3	121	391.6	35	113.3	2,447	7,919.1
Residential	West Central	Spence	4,415	12	54.4	333	1,508.5	562	2,545.9	686	3,107.6	106	480.2	3,394	15,374.9
Residential	West Central	St. Matthews	5,770	6	20.8	272	942.8	276	956.7	424	1,469.7	112	388.2	4,026	13,954.9
Residential	South West End	West Broadway	5,010	4	16.0	214	854.3	282	1,125.7	492	1,964.1	100	399.2	3,807	15,197.6
Residential	South West End	Wolseley	7,805	8	20.5	78	199.9	73	187.1	188	481.7	52	133.2	2,983	7,643.8
Residential	Fort Rouge East	Lord Roberts	4,965	1	4.0	33	132.9	56	225.6	126	507.6	38	153.1	1,308	5,268.9
Residential	Fort Rouge East	Riverview	4,270	1	4.7	41	192.0	20	93.7	52	243.6	20	93.7	945	4,426.2
Residential	Fort Rouge West	Crescentwood	2,715	0	0.0	16	117.9	17	125.2	32	235.7	16	117.9	1,312	9,664.8
Residential	Fort Rouge West	Early Grey	4,260	1	4.7	48	225.4	69	323.9	105	493.0	23	108.0	1,654	7,765.3
Residential	Fort Rouge West	Ebby-Wentworth	795	0	0.0	23	578.6	6	150.9	19	478.0	10	251.6	469	11,798.7
Res./Com.	Fort Rouge West	Grant Park	2,725	1	7.3	57	418.3	20	146.8	54	396.3	34	249.5	1,448	10,627.5
Residential	Fort Rouge West	Rockwood	4,245	0	0.0	20	94.2	16	75.4	24	113.1	8	37.7	1,194	5,625.4
Residential	Osborne-Corydon	McMillan	3,445	1	5.8	34	197.4	71	412.2	105	609.6	31	180.0	1,779	10,328.0
Res./Com.	Osborne-Corydon	River-Osborne	4,750	7	29.5	97	408.4	122	513.7	235	989.5	55	231.6	2,342	9,861.1
Residential	Osborne-Corydon	Roslyn	4,550	0	0.0	90	395.6	19	83.5	55	241.8	13	57.1	1,594	7,006.6
Residential	River Heights	Central River Heights	3,340	0	0.0	5	29.9	5	29.9	22	131.7	2	12.0	927	5,550.9
Residential	River Heights	J.B. Mitchell	2,270	0	0.0	13	114.5	3	26.4	15	132.2	2	17.6	534	4,704.8
Residential	River Heights	Mathers	2,680	0	0.0	4	29.9	5	37.3	14	104.5	1	7.5	475	3,544.8
Residential	River Heights	North River Heights	5,615	0	0.0	10	35.6	3	10.7	18	64.1	9	32.1	1,818	6,475.5
Residential	River Heights	Sir John Franklin	2,425	0	0.0	3	24.7	10	82.5	41	338.1	5	41.2	774	6,383.5
Residential	River Heights	South River Heights	2,665	0	0.0	0	0.0	17	127.6	26	195.1	8	60.0	1,171	8,788.0
Residential	River Heights	Wellington Crescent	1,655	0	0.0	28	338.4	7	84.6	27	326.3	3	36.3	870	10,513.6
Residential	Charleswood	Betsworth	4,040	0	0.0	1	5.0	7	34.7	17	84.2	6	29.7	228	1,128.7
Residential	Charleswood	Elmhurst	4,400	0	0.0	5	22.7	5	22.7	24	109.1	7	31.8	474	2,154.5
Residential	Charleswood	Eric Coy	2,440	1	8.2	2	16.4	4	32.8	12	98.4	5	41.0	154	1,262.3
Residential	Charleswood	Marlton	635	0	0.0	0	0.0	0	0.0	6	189.0	1	31.5	70	2,204.7
Residential	Charleswood	Ridgedale	715	0	0.0		0.0	5	139.9	1	28.0	0	0.0	46	1,286.7
Residential	Charleswood	Ridgewood South	190	0	0.0	0	0.0	4	421.1	5	526.3	3	315.8	102	10,736.8
Residential	Charleswood	River West Park	1,480	0	0.0	2	27.0	3	40.5	8	108.1	9	121.6	109	1,473.0
Residential	Charleswood	Roblin Park	945	0	0.0	2	42.3	6	127.0	6	127.0	0	0.0	105	2,222.2
Residential	Charleswood	Southboine	1,360	0	0.0	0	0.0	1	14.7	11	161.8	4	58.8	113	1,661.8
Residential	Charleswood	Varsity View	2,685	0	0.0	2	14.9	12	89.4	12	89.4	7	52.1	277	2,063.3
Residential	Charleswood	Vialoux	950	0	0.0	6	126.3	23	484.2	42	884.2	19	400.0	177	3,726.3
Residential	Charleswood	Westdale	4,540	0	0.0	33	145.4	31	136.6	84	370.0	23	101.3	707	3,114.5
Residential	Charleswood	Wilkes South	610	0	0.0	0	0.0	3	98.4	9	295.1	0	0.0	115	3,770.5
Residential	Tuxedo	Edgeland	1,255	0	0.0	23	366.5	24	382.5	61	972.1	25	398.4	572	9,115.5
Residential	Tuxedo	Old Tuxedo	915	0	0.0	0	0.0	10	218.6	80	1,748.6	21	459.0	211	4,612.0
Residential	Tuxedo	South Tuxedo	3,440	0	0.0	4	23.3	2	11.6	12	69.8	4	23.3	340	1,976.7
Residential	Tuxedo	Tuxedo	2,245	0	0.0	13	115.8	7	62.4	39	347.4	14	124.7	277	2,467.7
Residential	Elmwood	Chalmers	9,655	4	8.3	204	422.6	251	519.9	462	957.0	122	252.7	3,408	7,059.6
Residential	Elmwood	East Elmwood	3,425	0	0.0	18	105.1	62	362.0	153	893.4	38	221.9	768	4,484.7
Residential	Elmwood	Glenelm	2,155	0	0.0	24	222.7	31	287.7	30	278.4	23	213.5	796	7,387.5
Residential	Elmwood	Munroe West	3,010	0	0.0	32	212.6	20	132.9	58	385.4	18	119.6	857	5,694.4
Residential	Elmwood	Talbot-Grey	2,325	0	0.0	27	232.3	56	481.7	72	619.4	18	154.8	640	5,505.4
Residential	East Kildonan	Kildonan Drive	4,695	0	0.0	42	178.9	21	89.5	48	204.5	34	144.8	929	3,957.4
Residential	East Kildonan	Munroe East	8,500	1	2.4	39	91.8	96	225.9	185	435.3	47	110.6	1,514	3,562.4
Residential	East Kildonan	Rossmere-A	13,330	0	0.0	163	244.6	190	285.1	316	474.1	105	157.5	2,720	4,081.0
Residential	East Kildonan	Rossmere-B	4,185	0	0.0	23	109.9	15	71.7	43	205.5	16	76.5	611	2,920.0
Residential	North Kildonan	River East	7,725	0	0.0	37	95.8	37	95.8	92	238.2	35	90.6	1,208	3,127.5
Residential	North Kildonan	Springfield North	5,820	0	0.0	12	41.2	22	75.6	32	110.0	15	51.5	513	1,762.9
Residential	North Kildonan	Valhalla	2,855	2	14.0	6	42.0	6	42.0	21	147.1	8	56.0	321	2,248.7
Residential	Suburban Kildonan	Eaglemere	1,560	0	0.0	6	76.9	4	51.3	20	256.4	8	102.6	206	2,641.0
Residential	Suburban Kildonan	Grassie	5,120	0	0.0	2	7.8	17	66.4	29	113.3	17	66.4	365	1,425.8
Residential	Suburban Kildonan	Springfield South	1,495	0	0.0	1	13.4	11	147.2	5	66.9	1	13.4	231	3,090.3
Residential	Suburban Kildonan	Valley Gardens	8,430	1	2.4	55	130.5	72	170.8	135	320.3	46	109.1	1,694	4,019.0
Residential	Fort Whyte	Linden Woods	9,700	0	0.0	24	49.5	7	14.4	27	55.7	21	43.3	1,207	2,488.7
Residential	Fort Whyte	Linden Ridge	1,655	0	0.0	0	0.0	1	12.1	3	36.3	7	84.6	188	2,271.9
Residential	Fort Whyte	Whyte Ridge	7,690	0	0.0	10	26.0	9	23.4	22	57.2	13	33.8	565	1,469.4
Residential	Fort Whyte	Brockville	1,000	0	0.0	0	0.0	4	80.0	7	140.0	3	60.0	208	4,160.0
Residential	Fort Garry	Beaumont	2,310	0	0.0	28	242.4	43	372.3	60	519.5	16	138.5	1,056	9,142.9
Residential	Fort Garry	Crescent Park	2,650	0	0.0	18	135.8	29	218.9	57	430.2	10	75.5	559	4,218.9
Residential	Fort Garry	Maybank	2,500	1	8.0	6	48.0	33	264.0	38	304.0	16	128.0	487	3,896.0
Res./Com.	Fort Garry	Pembina Strip	3,175	0	0.0	43	270.9	56	352.8	81	510.2	20	126.0	1,219	7,678.7
Residential	Fort Garry	Point Road	1,870	0	0.0	14	149.7	18	192.5	29	310.2	10	107.0	441	4,716.6
Residential	Fort Garry	Wildwood	1,130	0	0.0	0	0.0	5	88.5	7	123.9	4	70.8	131	2,318.6
Residential	~	Transcona South	645	0	0.0	0	0.0	1	31.0	6	186.0	0	0.0	70	2,170.5
Residential	Transcona	Canterbury Park	8,005	0	0.0	5	12.5	34	84.9	87	217.4	23	57.5	571	1,426.6
Residential	Transcona	Kern Park	1,775	0	0.0	4	45.1	7	78.9	28	315.5	4	45.1	246	2,771.8
Residential	Transcona	Kildare-Redonda	6,140	0	0.0	20	65.1	26	84.7	61	198.7	24	78.2	937	3,052.1
Residential	Transcona	Meadows	6,465	0	0.0	19	58.8	10	30.9	29	89.7	17	52.6	638	1,973.7
Residential	Transcona	Melrose	1,660	0	0.0	13	156.6	24	289.2	35	421.7	13	156.6	356	4,289.2
Residential	Transcona	Mission Gardens	4,530	0	0.0	12	53.0	29	128.0	69	304.6	23	101.5	488	2,154.5
Residential	Transcona	Peguis	950	0	0.0	0	0.0	12	252.6	30	631.6	11	231.6	549	11,557.9
Residential	Transcona	Radisson	3,315	0	0.0	1	6.0	5	30.2	20	120.7	6	36.2	371	2,238.3
Residential	Transcona	Victoria West	2,705	0	0.0	15	110.9	38	281.0	71	525.0	14	103.5	493	3,645.1
Residential	St. Norbert	Richmond Lakes	1,620	0	0.0	1	12.3	3	37.0	12	148.1	7	86.4	131	1,617.3
Residential	St. Norbert	St. Norbert	1,765	0	0.0	5	56.7	6	68.0	26	294.6	3	34.0	306	3,467.4
Residential	St. Norbert	Parc La Salle	2,145	0	0.0	3	28.0	14	130.5	22	205.1	7	65.3	226	2,107.2
Residential	~	St. Vital Permimeter South	1,820	0	0.0	1	11.0	5	54.9	14	153.8	5	54.9	225	2,472.5
Residential	Dakota	Dakota Crossing	12,105	0	0.0	15	24.8	8	13.2	34	56.2	15	24.8	1,018	1,681.9
Residential	Dakota	Normand Park	1,745	0	0.0	3	34.4	1	11.5	4	45.8	4	45.8	166	1,902.6
Residential	Dakota	River Park South	13,355	0	0.0	14	21.0	18	27.0	73	109.3	30	44.9	918	1,374.8
Residential	North St. Vital	Alpine Place	3,895	0	0.0	20	102.7	21	107.8	68	349.2	16	82.2	565	2,901.2
Residential	North St. Vital	Elm Park	1,715	0	0.0	15	174.9	12	139.9	25	291.5	13	151.6	369	4,303.2
Residential	North St. Vital	Glenwood	3,880	0	0.0	32	164.9	23	118.6	60	309.3	9	46.4	1,942	10,010.3
Residential	North St. Vital	Kingston Crescent	720	0	0.0	0	0.0	0	0.0	0	0.0	0	0.0	0	0.0
Residential	North St. Vital	Lavalee	1,245	0	0.0	8	128.5	14	224.9	43	690.8	7	112.4	226	3,630.5
Residential	North St. Vital	Norberry	1,340	0	0.0	15	223.9	18	268.7	40	597.0	10	149.3	302	4,507.5
Residential	North St. Vital	Pulberry	4,705	0	0.0	23	97.8	25	106.3	54	229.5	14	59.5	612	2,601.5
Residential	North St. Vital	St. George	2,760	0	0.0	9	65.2	17	123.2	41	297.1	20	144.9	471	3,413.0
Residential	North St. Vital	Varennes	1,070	0	0.0	10	186.9	16	299.1	34	635.5	2	37.4	335	6,261.7
Residential	North St. Vital	Victoria Crescent	525	0	0.0	0	0.0	0	0.0	1	38.1	0	0.0	36	1,371.4
Residential	North St. Vital	Worthington	5,315	1	3.8	62	233.3	66	248.4	119	447.8	21	79.0	1,301	4,895.6
Residential	South St. Vital	Meadowood	5,685	1	3.5	35	123.1	46	161.8	94	330.7	26	91.5	1,344	4,728.2
Residential	South St. Vital	Minnetonka	4,285	0	0.0	16	74.7	13	60.7	41	191.4	15	70.0	569	2,655.8
Residential	South St. Vital	Vista	1,440	0	0.0	3	41.7	7	97.2	13	180.6	6	83.3	227	3,152.8
Residential	Fort Richmond	Agassiz	365	0	0.0	3	164.4	3	164.4	10	547.9	0	0.0	98	5,369.9
Residential	Fort Richmond	Cloutier Drive	320	0	0.0	0	0.0	2	125.0	0	0.0	0	0.0	24	1,500.0
Residential	Fort Richmond	Fort Richmond	11,770	2	3.4	72	122.3	84	142.7	198	336.4	52	88.4	1,644	2,793.5
Residential	Fort Richmond	Montcalm	4,940	0	0.0	86	348.2	60	242.9	144	583.0	55	222.7	1,301	5,267.2
Residential	Waverly West	Bridgewater Forest	4,520	0	0.0	0	0.0	6	26.5	22	97.3	9	39.8	401	1,774.3
Residential	Waverly West	Bridgewater Lakes	2,365	0	0.0	2	16.9	3	25.4	21	177.6	8	67.7	263	2,224.1
Residential	Waverly West	Bridgewater Trails	265	0	0.0	1	75.5	2	150.9	10	754.7	9	679.2	199	15,018.9
Residential	Waverly West	Fairfield Park	2,885	1	6.9	13	90.1	12	83.2	44	305.0	7	48.5	833	5,774.7
Residential	Waverly West	Richmond West	8,605	0	0.0	37	86.0	39	90.6	0	0.0	21	48.8	1,341	3,116.8
Residential	Waverly West	South Pointe	4,795	1	4.2	16	66.7	13	54.2	38	158.5	10	41.7	372	1,551.6
Residential	Waverly West	Waverly Heights	5,180	0	0.0	10	38.6	32	123.6	47	181.5	22	84.9	525	2,027.0
Residential	East Inkster	Burrows-Keewatin	3,015	4	26.5	43	285.2	96	636.8	174	1,154.2	35	232.2	648	4,298.5
Residential	East Inkster	Mynarski	1,900	0	0.0	22	231.6	15	157.9	39	410.5	6	63.2	426	4,484.2
Residential	East Inkster	Shaughnessy Park	2,745	0	0.0	27	196.7	35	255.0	57	415.3	15	109.3	674	4,910.7
Residential	Garden City	Garden City	6,255	0	0.0	87	278.2	42	134.3	131	418.9	35	111.9	1,914	6,119.9
Residential	Garden City	Templeton-Sinclair	6,010	0	0.0	57	189.7	23	76.5	69	229.6	36	119.8	2,156	7,174.7
Residential	North Main	Riverbend	5,555	1	3.6	3	10.8	11	39.6	20	72.0	9	32.4	222	799.3
Residential	North Main	Rivergrove	2,330	0	0.0	2	17.2	0	0.0	0	0.0	0	0.0	9	77.3
Residential	Old Kildonan	Amber Trails	8,415	0	0.0	8	19.0	13	30.9	61	145.0	27	64.2	612	1,454.5
Res./Com.	Old Kildonan	Leila North	1,230	1	16.3	52	845.5	35	569.1	69	1,122.0	24	390.2	690	11,219.5
Res./Com.	Old Kildonan	Leila-McPhillips Triangle	2,980	0	0.0	80	536.9	30	201.3	88	590.6	29	194.6	2,311	15,510.1
Residential	Old Kildonan	Mandalay West	6,075	0	0.0	13	42.8	14	46.1	51	167.9	22	72.4	701	2,307.8
Residential	Old Kildonan	Rosser – Old Kildonan	680	1	29.4	1	29.4	6	176.5	12	352.9	5	147.1	143	4,205.9
Residential	Old Kildonan	The Maples	14,630	2	2.7	65	88.9	125	170.9	252	344.5	80	109.4	1,946	2,660.3
Residential	West Inkster	Inkster Gardens	4,275	1	4.7	4	18.7	8	37.4	36	168.4	13	60.8	582	2,722.8
Residential	West Inkster	Tyndall Park	12,560	2	3.2	91	144.9	58	92.4	119	189.5	35	55.7	2,724	4,337.6
Residential	West Kildonan	Jefferson	8,985	0	0.0	85	189.2	75	166.9	208	463.0	66	146.9	2,234	4,972.7
Residential	West Kildonan	Margaret Park	2,210	0	0.0	7	63.3	17	153.8	51	461.5	11	99.5	364	3,294.1
Residential	West Kildonan	Seven Oaks	3,000	0	0.0	36	240.0	96	640.0	269	1,793.3	37	246.7	819	5,460.0
Residential	Weston	Brooklands	2,820	1	7.1	91	645.4	110	780.1	159	1,127.7	37	262.4	1,019	7,227.0
Residential	Weston	Weston	6,235	0	0.0	149	477.9	228	731.4	342	1,097.0	72	231.0	2,189	7,021.7
Residential	~	Holden	180	0	0.0	0	0.0	0	0.0	4	444.4	1	111.1	40	4,444.4
Res./Com.	Dugald	St. Boniface Industrial Park	1,520	0	0.0	7	92.1	6	78.9	21	276.3	9	118.4	211	2,776.3
Residential	East Seine	Island Lakes	7,525	0	0.0	1	2.7	7	18.6	23	61.1	10	26.6	357	948.8
Residential	East Seine	Niakwa Place	2,305	0	0.0	1	8.7	3	26.0	12	104.1	7	60.7	158	1,370.9
Residential	East Seine	Royalwood	4,955	0	0.0	1	4.0	8	32.3	12	48.4	7	28.3	258	1,041.4
Residential	East Seine	Sage Creek	4,790	0	0.0	4	16.7	5	20.9	10	41.8	3	12.5	514	2,146.1
Residential	East Seine	Southdale	6,450	1	3.1	31	96.1	26	80.6	53	164.3	24	74.4	1,310	4,062.0
Residential	East Seine	Southland Park	1,210	1	16.5	1	16.5	3	49.6	4	66.1	3	49.6	89	1,471.1
Residential	East St. Boniface	Maginot	1,545	0	0.0	1	12.9	15	194.2	26	336.6	3	38.8	269	3,482.2
Residential	East St. Boniface	Niakwa Park	710	0	0.0	2	56.3	1	28.2	6	169.0	3	84.5	111	3,126.8
Res./Com.	East St. Boniface	Stock Yards	710	0	0.0	3	84.5	6	169.0	12	338.0	2	56.3	375	10,563.4
Residential	East St. Boniface	Windsor Park	10,050	1	2.0	48	95.5	44	87.6	136	270.6	41	81.6	1,174	2,336.3
Residential	St. Boniface	Archwood	740	0	0.0	0	0.0	0	0.0	0	0.0	0	0.0	0	0.0
Residential	St. Boniface	Central St. Boniface	6,165	0	0.0	119	386.1	116	376.3	284	921.3	88	285.5	3,958	12,840.2
Residential	St. Boniface	Dufresne	370	0	0.0	2	108.1	7	378.4	9	486.5	4	216.2	130	7,027.0
Residential	St. Boniface	North St. Boniface	2,085	0	0.0	19	182.3	26	249.4	62	594.7	15	143.9	993	9,525.2
Residential	St. Boniface	Norwood East	4,070	0	0.0	34	167.1	51	250.6	82	402.9	29	142.5	1,515	7,444.7
Residential	St. Boniface	Norwood West	2,965	0	0.0	14	94.4	24	161.9	48	323.8	9	60.7	1,161	7,831.4
Res./Com.	~	Assiniboa Downs	415	0	0.0	1	48.2	4	192.8	11	530.1	4	192.8	141	6,795.2
Residential	Assiniboia	Buchanan	2,980	0	0.0	3	20.1	14	94.0	57	382.6	12	80.5	349	2,342.3
Residential	Assiniboia	Crestview	8,680	0	0.0	130	299.5	67	154.4	164	377.9	73	168.2	1,841	4,241.9
Residential	Assiniboia	Heritage Park	5,535	0	0.0	16	57.8	30	108.4	78	281.8	21	75.9	652	2,355.9
Residential	Assiniboia	Sturgeon Creek	2,955	1	6.8	38	257.2	14	94.8	45	304.6	11	74.5	1,053	7,126.9
Residential	East St. James	Bruce Park	2,135	0	0.0	3	28.1	7	65.6	26	243.6	14	131.1	419	3,925.1
Residential	East St. James	Deer Lodge	3,875	0	0.0	7	36.1	13	67.1	53	273.5	13	67.1	708	3,654.2
Residential	East St. James	Kensington	270	0	0.0	33	2,444.4	10	740.7	27	2,000.0	5	370.4	259	19,185.2
Residential	East St. James	King Edward	5,525	0	0.0	85	307.7	51	184.6	134	485.1	34	123.1	1,503	5,440.7
Residential	East St. James	West Wolseley	305	1	65.6	15	983.6	16	1,049.2	33	2,163.9	3	196.7	187	12,262.3
Residential	Kirkfield Park	Glendale	1,040	0	0.0	7	134.6	9	173.1	37	711.5	17	326.9	197	3,788.5
Residential	Kirkfield Park	Kirkfield	2,785	1	7.2	4	28.7	19	136.4	29	208.3	8	57.5	407	2,922.8
Residential	Kirkfield Park	Westwood	7,095	1	2.8	26	73.3	16	45.1	61	172.0	19	53.6	951	2,680.8
Residential	West St. James	Birchwood	2,170	0	0.0	4	36.9	7	64.5	42	387.1	6	55.3	355	3,271.9
Residential	West St. James	Booth	5,465	1	3.7	22	80.5	60	219.6	137	501.4	35	128.1	990	3,623.1
Residential	West St. James	Jameswood	1,380	0	0.0	2	29.0	6	87.0	9	130.4	3	43.5	160	2,318.8
Residential	West St. James	Silver Heights	5,140	0	0.0	28	108.9	30	116.7	64	249.0	26	101.2	1,035	4,027.2
Residential	West St. James	Woodhaven	900	0	0.0	0	0.0	0	0.0	1	22.2	1	22.2	110	2,444.4

The table below features all of the majorly non-residential neighborhoods of Winnipeg, which includes things like shopping malls, parks, the airport and other commercial and industrial centers. There are no rates in this table because it is not appropriate to compare crime rates in residential areas with rates in industrial-commercial areas, as these areas are largely unpopulated with permanent residents when compared to how many people work there and how many people visit the area.

Crime in Winnipeg Commercial-Industrial Neighborhoods, 2017–2021
Type	Area	Neighborhood	Pop.	Homicide	Robbery	Agr. Aslt.	Cmn. Aslt	Utt. Threat	Property
Ind./Com.	North End	Dufferin Industrial	0	0	18	13	10	4	313
Ind./Com.	Central	Chinatown	420	0	34	31	55	19	446
Ind./Com.	Central	Logan CPR	240	3	85	113	223	53	1,054
Ind./Com.	Central	South Point Douglas	390	11	93	271	463	94	1,046
Ind./Com.	Downtown	Civic Center	155	0	29	38	56	11	512
Ind./Com.	Downtown	Exchange District	630	1	60	97	178	46	2,203
Park	Downtown	Legislature	0	0	17	16	59	20	410
Ind./Com.	Downtown	Portage & Main	0	0	25	20	58	9	422
Ind./Com.	Downtown	Portage-Ellice	1,075	2	190	221	505	67	1,540
Ind./Com.	Downtown	South Portage	1,865	4	294	275	675	163	4,806
Park	Downtown	The Forks	0	0	32	39	69	6	462
Park	Tuxedo	Assiniboine Park	0	0	3	2	8	2	98
Ind./Com.	~	Tuxedo Industrials	545	0	29	14	32	26	1,413
Ind./Com.	Elmwood	Kildonan Crossing	0	1	22	11	37	15	446
Ind./Com.	Elmwood	Tyne-Tees	0	0	24	8	18	5	617
Ind./Com.	~	North Transcona Yards	0	0	0	0	4	1	63
Park	North Kildonan	Kil-Cona Park	335	0	0	3	2	1	59
Ind./Com.	Suburban Kildonan	McLeod Industrial	0	0	7	2	6	0	251
Ind./Com.	Fort Whyte	West Fort Garry Industrial	0	0	7	2	14	5	512
Ind./Com.	Fort Garry	Buffalo	0	1	0	3	4	3	126
Ind./Com.	Fort Garry	Chevrier	0	0	2	6	12	2	343
Ind./Com.	Fort Garry	Parker	0	0	0	0	2	0	48
Ind./Com.	~	Griffin	0	0	0	0	1	1	47
Ind./Com.	~	Transcona North	0	0	0	0	0	0	13
Ind./Com.	Transcona	Regent	0	0	179	41	132	51	3,858
Ind./Com.	Transcona	Transcona Yards	0	0	0	3	0	0	98
Park	~	Maple Grove Park	0	0	0	0	4	0	21
Ind./Com.	South St. Vital	St. Vital Centre	0	0	75	15	58	24	1,043
University	~	University (of Manitoba)	0	1	4	7	26	2	440
Ind./Com.	Waverly West	Bridgewater Centre	250	0	11	1	9	3	282
Undeveloped	Waverly West	Waverly West B	0	0	0	0	1	0	13
Ind./Com.	East Inkster	Inkster Industrial Park	0	0	3	9	20	6	604
Ind./Com.	Garden City	West Kildonan Industrial	0	0	1	1	8	2	135
Ind./Com.	West Inkster	North Inkster Industrial	310	0	0	5	6	3	173
Ind./Com.	West Inkster	Oak Point Highway	0	0	2	0	4	2	329
Park	West Kildonan	Kildonan Park	0	0	3	1	7	1	60
Ind./Com.	Weston	Omand's Creek Industrial	0	1	3	3	6	1	323
Ind./Com.	Weston	Pacific Industrial	0	0	19	8	16	2	451
Ind./Com.	Weston	Weston Shops	0	0	9	12	10	4	237
Ind./Com.	~	Mission Industrial	0	1	1	2	14	1	476
Ind./Com.	~	Symington Yards	0	0	0	1	3	1	137
Ind./Com.	Dugald	Dugald	0	0	0	0	2	1	101
Ind./Com.	East Seine	The Mint	0	0	0	0	0	0	6
Ind./Com.	St. Boniface	Tissot	0	0	78	9	9	5	4
Airport	~	Airport	130	0	2	4	17	6	287
Ind./Com.	~	Polo Park	275	2	480	83	192	49	3,429
Ind./Com.	~	St. James Industrial	0	0	218	111	257	44	4,424
Ind./Com.	Assiniboia	Saskatchewan North	0	0	0	2	4	0	55
Ind./Com.	West St. James	Murray Industrial Park	0	0	0	1	2	1	68

=== Gangs and terrorism ===
The Terrorism Research & Analysis Consortium has listed Winnipeg as one of Canada's "vulnerable cities" for terrorism.

By 1998, Winnipeg had garnered a reputation as the "gang capital" of Canada. Accordingly, the Canadian Police Association claimed in 2013 that gangs were "a key and distinguishing feature of the urban landscape in Winnipeg." In 2019, there were an estimated 4,000 local gang members in Winnipeg—around 1,500 full members and 2,500 associates—spread out between 25 and 30 separate gangs. This total number of members has remained roughly the same over the years, though the associated gang violence has grown.

In 2020, gangs were a significant driving force of violence in Winnipeg—with 50% of all 110 shootings and 30% of the 41 homicides by December 14 that year being gang related.

Criminal organizations (active and inactive) based in Winnipeg include:

- Most notable groups: African/Afrikan Mafia, formed in 2005; Deuce (formerly The Over Lords, or TOL); Indian Posse, formed in 1988; Mad Cowz; MMM (Money Making Mali's); Manitoba Warriors (or 1323), formed in the 1990s; Main Street Rattlers (defunct), formed in the 1980s; Most Organized Brothers (MOB); Native Syndicate, formed in the 1990s; Redd Alert, formed in the late 1990s;
- Other groups: 204 Girlz; 334 Mob Squad; All 'Bout Money (ABM), formed in 2008; Da Pitbull Army (DPA), formed in 2006; East Side Crips; Gangsta Crips; Good Squad; Junior Warriors; Krazies; Los Votos Chicanos; Noe Luv Crew; Nine O; North End Brotherhood; Renegades; Ruthless Crew; Sodiers; South Broadway Gang; Spade Bloods; Terror Squad; Terrorizer; TFN (Tax Free N*ggers); Transcona Guardian Angels; West End Boyz; and Westside Outlawz.

Local criminal cells in Winnipeg include Bandidos Motorcycle Club (Los Montoneros), who merged with Rock Machine in 2000; Bloods (Troublesum Bloodz, Westside Bloodz); Crips (East Side Crips, Westside Crips); Los Bravos, which turned into Manitoba's first Hells Angels chapter in 2000; and Triple M.

The 2004 film Stryker, directed by Noam Gonick, depicts gang violence in Winnipeg's North End.

==== History ====
In 1949, the Dew Drop Gang was formed only to disappeared in April the following year. Other than that, prior to the 1980s, Winnipeg did not have many street gangs.

It was autumn in 1993 when Winnipeg would see its first street gang-related murder: the stabbing of Chris Robichaud, over a pack of cigarettes, by an Indigenous youth nearby Grant Park Shopping Centre. In response, to address the prevalence of youth violence in Winnipeg, Manitoba Minister of Justice Rosemary Vodrey called an emergency violence summit to be held in December 1993.

In March 1993, the suspected leader for a gang based in Winnipeg's Maples area was arrested for uttering threats to school officials. This gang, which supposedly had 200 members around the city, was allegedly running a protection racket in the Seven Oake School Division. Winnipeg saw its first fatal gang-related drive-by shooting in July 1995, when 13-year-old Joseph "Beeper" Spence was shot in the back and killed outside a North End daycare centre. Spence was mistaken for an Indian Posse member by 8 members of the Deuce street gang. By May 1996, there were approximately 730 active street gang members, 75% of whom were Indigenous and 75% adults.

In 2020, gangs were a significant driving force of violence in Winnipeg—with 50% of all 110 shootings and 30% of the 41 homicides by December 14 that year being gang related.

==== Demographic-based gangs ====
Winnipeg's gang activity consists of a number of demographics, primarily of Indigenous peoples, newcomers, and black Canadians, along with other ethnic groups, namely European and East Asian (Filipino and Vietnamese). Moreover, in 2001, the overwhelming majority of identified female gang members (between 60% and 98%) in Winnipeg were found to be "Aboriginal" (i.e., Indigenous). Nonetheless, poverty and homelessness are much greater indicators of gang involvement than race, as well as addiction, intergenerational trauma, broken families, and social isolation.

Ethnic-criminal organizations (active and inactive) centered in Winnipeg include:

- Indigenous gangs: Indian Posse, formed in 1988; Manitoba Warriors (or 1323), formed in the 1990s; Main Street Rattlers (defunct), formed in the 1980s;Most Organized Brothers (MOB); Native Syndicate, formed in the 1990s; Redd Alert, formed in the late 1990s; East Side Crips; Deuce (formerly The Over Lords, or TOL); Nine O; North End Brotherhood; Terror Squad; West End Boyz
- Black/African-Canadian gangs: African/Afrikan Mafia, formed in 2005; All 'Bout Money (ABM), formed in 2008; Da Pitbull Army (DPA), formed in 2006; Mad Cowz; MMM (Money Making Mali's); and TFN (Tax Free N*ggers)

Newcomers have been susceptible to fall into gang associations often due to the lack of access to resources and/or alienation in their new environment. The largest proportion of Winnipeg immigrant-gangs in 2013 was African-Canadian—around 35% (including the Mad Cowz and the African Mafia). One reason is that many newcomers come from especially violent backgrounds in war-torn countries (such as Somalia, Kenya, Congo). In early 2018, Winnipeg Police identified at least 2 gangs that were heavily recruiting immigrants.

The African Mafia, which was formed in 2005, is notoriously violent and has since splintered into other factions and regions. As late as 2019, Central Winnipeg is said to be a "stronghold" of Mad Cowz, with an additional presence of TFN and MMM, both gangs being splinters of the African Mafia. Recent shootings in the city are believed to be gang-related, including a fatal double homicide in 2019 in the Exchange District.

Formed in the early 1980s, the now-defunct Main Street Rattlers was the first Indigenous street gang in Winnipeg, chiefly operating as drug traffickers for biker gangs. About one year after the Rattlers' emerged, Asian gangs would begin to appear, engaging in much more serious violent crimes than other gangs of the time, such as extortion and armed robbery, mostly directed at the local Asian community. Around the end of the 1980s came the Vietnamese-Canadian "Halloween Gang", who were reportedly responsible for the 1988 murder of a teenage prostitute named Charlene Orsulak.

Indigenous gangs that followed the Rattlers were the Indian Posse in 1988 and the Manitoba Warriors in the 1990s, the latter beginning primarily as security on reserves and subsequently becoming a key player in the Winnipeg drug trade. The Native Syndicate would emerge soon after, as a prison gang at first.

By May 1996, there were approximately 730 active street gang members, 75% of whom were Indigenous and 75% adults.

In 2012—six years after it first caught the attention of Winnipeg Police Service (WPS)—WPS said the MOB had grown into a major criminal threat with over 100 documented members and associates. In 2008, the MOB began affiliating with the Manitoba Warriors, who would supply them drugs in exchange for committing violence on the Warriors' behalf. However, the two gangs have since become violent rivals.

== Crime in Manitoba ==
In 2011, Manitoba had the highest violent crime rate and homicide rate of all Canadian provinces.

Among municipalities of Manitoba in the 2019 Violent Crime Severity Index (VCSI), Thompson ranked #1 out of 237 with a rating of 570 (the national average was 82.44). Its overall Crime Severity Index (CSI) rating came at 366 against the national average of 75.01. Portage la Prairie came at #3 with a CSI of 263 and VCSI of 316); Selkirk at #7 (CSI: 193; VCSI: 231); Winnipeg at #13 (CSI: 125; VCSI: 173); Brandon at #35 (CSI: 115; VCSI: 116); Steinbach at #79 (CSI: 87; VCSI: 80); and Winkler and Stanley at #140 (CSI: 54; VCSI: 52).

2024 was the deadliest year in the province's history with a record 99 homicides being reported, which gave the province a homicide rate of around 7.4 per 100,000 people.

== Social services ==
Organizations and initiatives in Winnipeg that serve at-risk, marginalized, and/or rehabilitation-seeking people include:

- Gang Action Interagency Network — a collection of government and non-profit agencies, community groups, and law enforcement officials who collaborate towards supporting gang members out of a criminal lifestyle and towards grassroots initiatives against gang activity.
- Immigrant and Refugee Community Organization of Manitoba — a non-profit agency for settling new Canadians.
- Ogijiita Pimatiswin Kinamatawin — a social service agency that works with at-risk Indigenous youth and adults.
- Rossbrook House — a neighbourhood drop-in centre active in Winnipeg's Centennial area, offering a safe space for children and young adults.
- Winnipeg Youth Gang Prevention Fund

== In pop culture ==
Pop culture depictions of politics and/or crime in Winnipeg include:

- Stryker (2004), directed by Noam Gonick, is film that depicts gang violence in Winnipeg's North End.
- Seven Times Lucky (2004), directed by Gary Yates and starring Kevin Pollak, is a crime drama film centring on a con man involved in a criminal scam.
- Strike! (2005) is a stage musical set during the 1919 Winnipeg general strike. It was adapted into a film in 2019, titled Stand! and directed by Robert Adetuyi.
- Yoga Hosers (2016), directed by Kevin Smith.

== See also ==
- List of mayors of Winnipeg
- Canadian federal election results in Winnipeg
- Death of Jaylene Redhead
- If Day
- Crime in Canada
  - Gangs in Canada
