= Canada Millennium Scholarship Foundation =

Scholarship Foundation

Canada Millennium Scholarship Foundation logo

The Canada Millennium Scholarship Foundation (French: Fondation canadienne des bourses d'etudes du millénaire) was a private, independent organization created by an act of the Parliament of Canada in 1998. It received an initial endowment of $2.5 billion from the federal government to provide awards annually for ten years. The foundation distributed $325 million in the form of bursaries and scholarships each year throughout Canada in support of post-secondary education. Additionally, the foundation conducted research into post-secondary access via the Millennium Research Program.

== Overview ==
The Canada Millennium Scholarship Foundation was created by an Act of Parliament in 1998 by the then Liberal government under Jean Chrétien. Branded as Canada's way to marking the new millennium, the Foundation was endowed with CAD$2.5 billion and was given the mandate to 1) improve access to post-secondary education for all Canadians, especially those facing economic or social barriers, to 2) encourage a high level of student achievement and engagement in Canadian society; and to 3) build a national alliance of organizations and individuals around a shared post-secondary agenda.

Since 2000, the Foundation delivered more than half a million bursaries and scholarships worth more than $1.5 billion to students across Canada. Its two best-known scholarship programs were:

- The Millennium Bursary Program, which targeted students with the greatest financial need, and
- The Millennium Excellence Award Program, which provided scholarships based on merit (including leadership, innovation, academic achievement and community service).

Separate sets of awards were provided to entrance and in-course post-secondary students.

== Millennium Bursary Program ==
The Millennium Bursary Program represented 95% of the awards distributed by the Foundation. The value of the Foundation's millennium bursaries was approximately $3,000 on average, but ranged from $1,000 to $4,993.

== Millennium Excellence Award Program ==
The Canada Millennium Scholarship Foundation also issued merit-based scholarships to deserving youths through its Millennium Excellence Awards Program. The Excellence Awards were divided into two groups: the Entrance Awards geared towards students entering their first year of post-secondary education, and the In-Course Awards for those already enrolled in post-secondary studies. Laureates of these awards all exhibited excellence in community involvement, innovation, leadership and academic achievement. The MEAP was unique because of its Canada-wide reach; whether a student lived in a major metropolitan area or in a remote village, anyone could apply and be evaluated based on their contribution to their community. Excellence Awards represented only 5% of the total scholarship sum awarded by the Foundation. More than 10,000 Excellence Awards have been issued since 2000.

Laureates were invited to participate in regional or national conferences hosted by the Foundation. Laureates also had access to project seed money through the Millennium Grants Program.

=== Entrance Awards ===
As of 2008, there were three different levels of Entrance Awards:

- Local awards: one-time awards of $4,500
- Provincial/territorial awards: $16,000 award, disbursed in annual allotments
- National awards: $20,000 award, disbursed in annual allotments

=== In-Course Awards ===
As of 2008, there were three different level of In-Course Awards

- Up to 100 awards of $5,000, renewable for up to one additional year, for a total of $10,000
- Up to 200 awards of $4,000, renewable for up to one additional year, for a total of $8,000
- Up to 900 one-time awards of $4,500.

Exceptional laureates were also allowed to apply for an additional Millennium grant of $2,500 towards a community building project.

== Millennium Research Program ==
The Millennium Research Program was launched in 2001 to assist the Canada Millennium Scholarship Foundation in carrying out its mandate to improve access to post-secondary education in Canada and provide students with the educational opportunities they need to prepare themselves for the future. The Research Program advanced the study of barriers to post-secondary education and the impact of policies and programs designed to alleviate them. It ensured that policy-making and public discussion about opportunities in higher education in Canada were informed by rigorous analysis and empirical evidence.

== Dissolution and legacy ==
In February 2008, the federal government decided not to renew the CMSF at the end of its 10-year mandate. It was replaced with the Canada Student Grants Program, which will distribute $350 million per year to post-secondary education students. Much controversy has come to light since the government has announced this program, in which 250,000 students will now benefit per year, as opposed to the approximately 100,000 that are receiving money from the CMSF. Although the amount of money that the federal government will be putting towards post-secondary education has not changed dramatically, the average student award decreased from about $3000 per year to about $1250 per year.

Before the decision was made, Canada's two largest national post-secondary student organizations, the Canadian Federation of Students (CFS) and the Canadian Alliance of Student Associations (CASA), took dramatically different views on the fund's future. While CASA fully endorsed the foundation's renewal, on the basis that non-renewal would constitute a significant cut to student financial assistance, the CFS had called for the organization to be replaced with a system of grants based purely on financial need. After the announcement was made, the CFS noted that the new grant program was just "splitting the same amount of grant money among more students".

The Millennium Excellence Awards Program, the merit-based component of the scholarship program, was not renewed, thus ending one of the two Canada-wide merit scholarships in existence, with only the Loran Scholars Foundation remaining. However, as of 2009, alumni of the MEAP founded the Millennium Network, a non-profit organization that is part alumni association, part community action group that aims to help build capacity of existing community actors.

== See also ==
- Canadian Merit Scholarship Foundation (Awarded to up to 30 students every year)
- Higher education in Canada
- National Merit Scholarship (U.S. equivalent)
