= Public Safety Building (Winnipeg) =

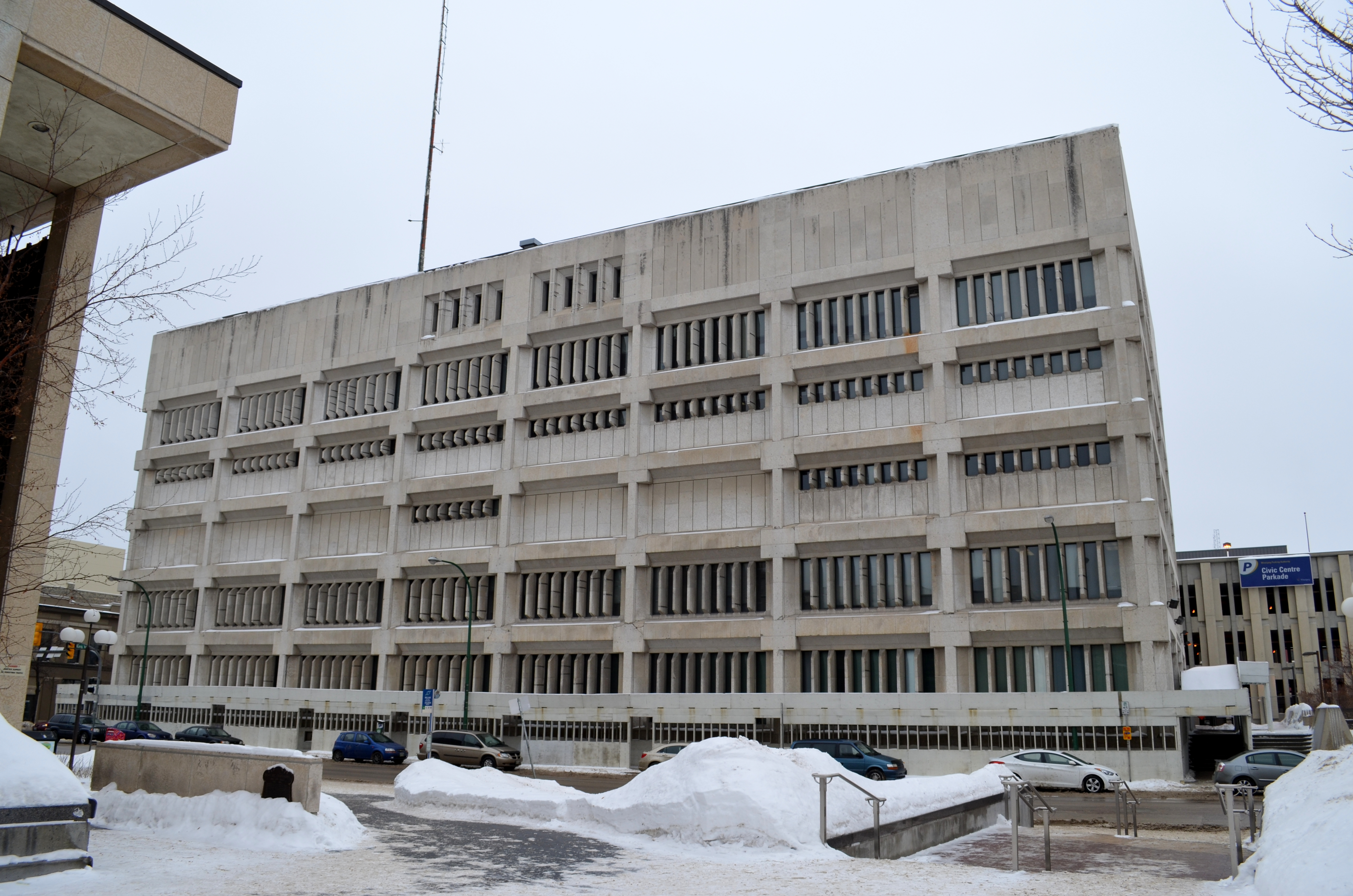

General information
- Status: Demolished
- Architectural style: Brutalist
- Location: 151-171 Princess Street, Winnipeg, Manitoba
- Coordinates: 49.8997°N 97.1410°W
- Completed: 1966
- Opened: May 18, 1966
- Relocated: 2016
- Demolished: January to November 2020
- Cost: $4.8 m CAD

Technical details
- Material: Tyndall stone

Design and construction
- Architect: Les Stechesen
- Architecture firm: Libling Michener and Associates

The Public Safety Building was a building in the Exchange District of Winnipeg, Manitoba, Canada, serving as the Winnipeg Police Service headquarters from 1966 to 2016. Along with the associated Civic Centre Car Park, the Public Safety Building was connected to the City Hall by an underground walkway.

Built in 1965, the structure was designed by Libling Michener & Associates in the brutalist style of modernism, and clad in Tyndall limestone. The land that the building resided on is approximately one-half hectare.

In 2020, the Public Safety Building and Civic Centre parkade were demolished to make way for new multi-use facilities, called Market Lands, the construction of which is currently ongoing.

== History ==
The plot of land on which the building was built was originally part of a 100-acre (40 ha) river lot granted to Alexander Ross, a Scottish-born fur trader and the first postmaster of the Red River Colony. Winnipeg was officially incorporated in 1875, and on June 7 that year, the third generation of the Ross family signed over a portion of the remaining land to the municipality at the below-market rate of $600, with a stipulation that the land be always be kept for civic purposes, otherwise it would revert to the family. Sale of the property would need to be vetted by one of the Ross descendants, of which there were an estimated 19 still alive as of 2012.

In 1964, following the opening of the Winnipeg City Hall, Winnipeg City Council announced that a building would be constructed adjacent to the city hall. In the original master plan, the site of the Public Safety Building was to house the Greater Winnipeg Metropolitan government. At the time, the land was the site of a 19th-century market building that was converted into civic offices, which were moved into the new Winnipeg City Hall Administration Building in 1964.

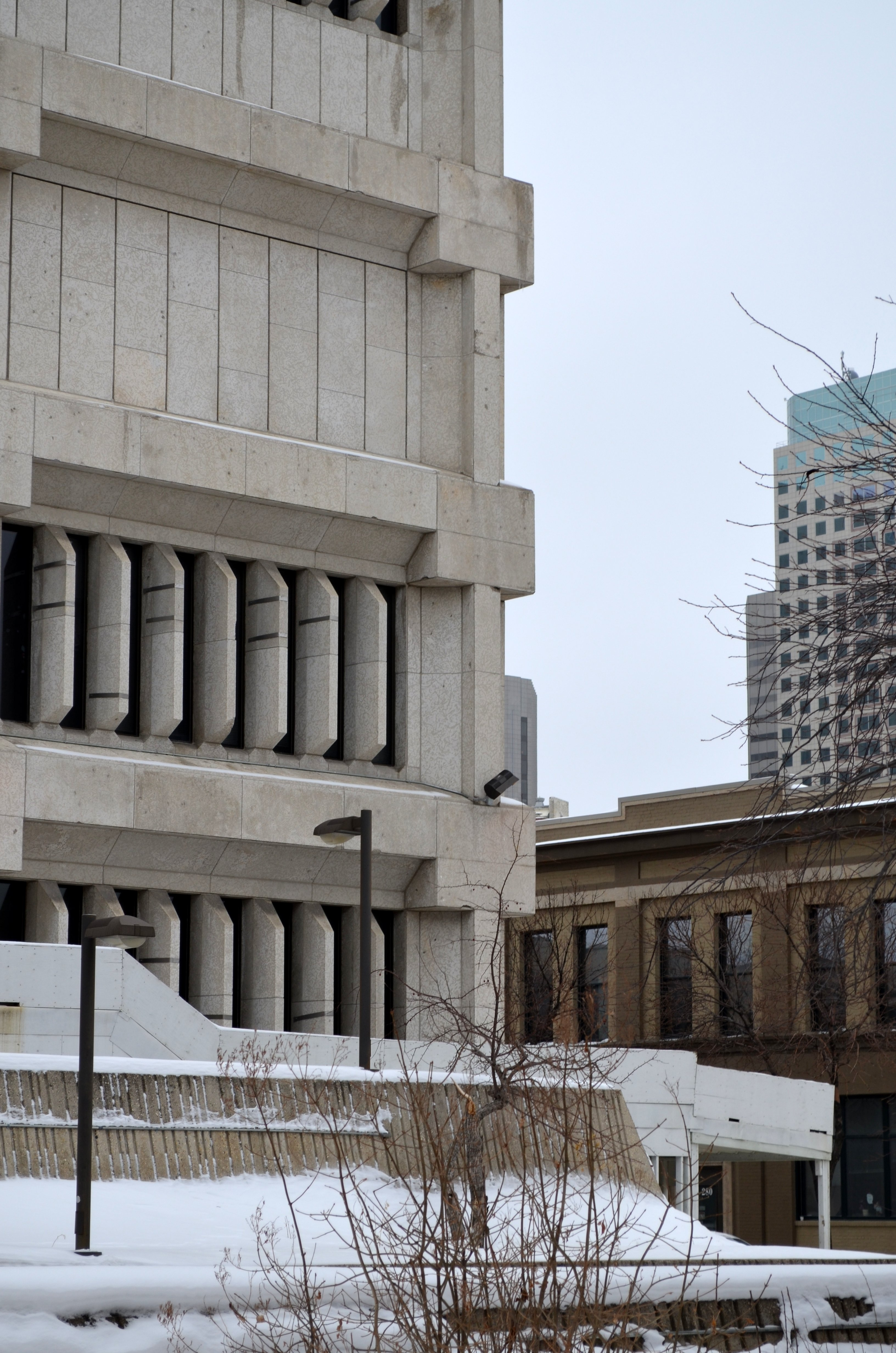
Limestone cladding with steel brackets holding it in place

On 21 December 1964, Winnipeg City Council awarded a contract for the construction of the new Public Safety Building and Civic Parkade at a cost of $4.8 million on the land. The Winnipeg Police headquarters moved into the Public Safety Building shortly after its construction in 1966, replacing the city's main police station on James Avenue (built in 1908).

The limestone cladding on the building degraded over the years, due to moisture seeping in between the cladding and Winnipeg's freeze-thaw cycles separating the limestone sections from their braces. In many places, steel brackets were added to keep the stone sections in place. Some of the limestone cladding fell off of the building's façade and there was continued risk of stone falling off. Because of this, the city enclosed the sidewalk below with a $100,000 sheltered walkway in 2006.

In 2009, seeking to replace the police headquarters, the City of Winnipeg purchased the former Canada Post mail-processing facility on Graham Avenue in downtown Winnipeg, where construction of a new headquarters would begin. Moreover, due to structural issues the Civic Parkade was decommissioned in 2012. By the end of 2013, the new facility's renovations cost $210 million. The new police headquarters opened in 2016, leaving the Public Safety Building and Civic Parkade vacant.

In April 2016, Winnipeg City Council resolved to demolish the Public Safety Building and Civic Centre parkade to make way for new multi-use facilities. Exterior demolition began in January 2020 and the work concluded in November 2020.

Construction of the Market Lands redevelopment began in January 2024 and is underway, with completion targeted for 2026. In July 2025, City Council approved the next phase that includes two mixed-use residential buildings, one four to six storeys with about 126 units and one 16 storeys with about 148 units, with a mix of market and affordable housing.
