= Millennium Research Program =

The Millennium Research Program of the Canada Millennium Scholarship Foundation was launched in 2001 to assist the Foundation in carrying out its mandate to improve access to post-secondary education in Canada and provide students with the educational opportunities they need to prepare themselves for the future. The Research Program advances the study of barriers to post-secondary education and the impact of policies and programs designed to alleviate them. It ensures that policy-making and public discussion about opportunities in higher education in Canada can be informed by rigorous analysis and empirical evidence.

Over the years the millennium research program, through its numerous publications, has contributed to the discussion on the issue of access to post-secondary education. The most notable of these publications is the Price of Knowledge. It provides analysis of key trends and new data relating to access to post-secondary education, student finances and financial assistance programs. The third and most recent edition was published in 2007.

== Objectives ==
The principal objectives of the Program are:

- To increase understanding of the key barriers to access to and participation in post-secondary education and of the relative effectiveness of policies that might alleviate them
- To provide the data and analysis necessary to monitor the impact of the Foundation's bursaries and awards (including their interaction with other forms of student financial assistance) and to guide the development of new programs
- To act as a catalyst to research on post-secondary education opportunities within the wider research and policy communities by disseminating the results of studies, convening research conferences, facilitating the creation of new data sources, promoting the development of innovative research methodologies, and creating new research partnerships
- To raise awareness among citizens and policy-makers of issues relating to post-secondary education opportunities and of the implications for public policy of the latest research on student financial aid and access to post-secondary education.

== Means ==
These objectives are carried out through the following means:

- Through the publication of The Price of Knowledge, the Foundation's comprehensive fact book that reports and analyzes trends relating to post-secondary education access and student finance. The book presents the latest information on post-secondary education, participation, barriers to access, the cost of post-secondary education, the mechanisms for financing post-secondary education including all sources of student financial aid, the incidence and magnitude of student debt, government expenditures on post-secondary education, and graduate employment and earnings. The first edition was published in 2002, and the second in 2004.
- Through the commissioning and publication of an extensive series of research reports, under the heading Does Money Matter? The Millennium Research Series. The reports make a substantive original contribution to knowledge about factors affecting access to post-secondary education and the impact of public policies designed to promote educational opportunity. Approximately ten separate reports are published each year.
- Through the commissioning and publishing of other occasional reports or studies relating to post-secondary education access and student finance in Canada, including quantitative and qualitative studies of the attitudes of students and parents towards post-secondary education and their behaviour in terms of preparing for college or university.
- Through the initiation and management, in partnership with participating provinces, of several intensive studies of the relative effectiveness and efficiency of different types of early interventions designed to encourage greater participation in post-secondary education among targeted groups of students (particularly those from less economically privileged backgrounds). These research "pilot projects" involve the creation and support of interventions directed at students and their families over a period of five years and the scientific evaluation of their outcomes. The goal is to help policy-makers identify which type or combination of interventions can be expected to produce the best results in terms of promoting access to higher education from traditionally under-represented groups.
- Through the hosting of national research and policy conferences that bring together leading Canadian and international experts on issues relating to educational opportunities and student financial aid, in order to discuss the latest research findings, establish research priorities, assess the performance of current programs, and build capacity within the wider research and policy community.
- Through the provision of statistical reports and analyses of the impact of the foundation's millennium bursaries and excellence awards to the foundation's management, board of directors, board of members, external stakeholders and the public.

The Program's research publications are vetted by a review panel of experts.

== Themes ==
The Program's work has touched on a broad range of subjects that can be grouped under the following research themes:

- Access to Post-Secondary Education in Canada, with a focus on who participates in post-secondary education, who does not, and why. Studies address such topics as the current make-up of the student body, the costs of and means of paying for post-secondary education, the availability of student financial assistance, the extent of student debt, the impact of tuition policy, and the effectiveness of other policies and interventions designed to enhance access. Special attention is paid to the issue of the equality of educational opportunity and the experiences of different groups of the population, such as Aboriginal youth or students from disadvantaged economic backgrounds. Studies also address the issue of access from a wider perspective that looks at how the overall economic, social and cultural context in which children and families develop affects the desire and the ability of students to pursue college or university studies.
- Preparing for Post-Secondary Education, with a focus on whether students, families and schools have the information, academic support and financial means necessary to adequately plan and prepare for successful entry into post-secondary education. Studies – included most notably the Foundation's pilot projects – examine how decision-making about post-secondary education, especially within families whose children are less likely to attend college or university, is influenced by different factors including the availability of academic support, financial support and of information about the costs, benefits, and means of financing post-secondary education.

When possible, the Foundation's research incorporates in a comparative dimension that allows for relevant evidence from other countries to be brought to bear the discussion of the situation in Canada.
