= Jessie Kirk =

Canadian alderwoman

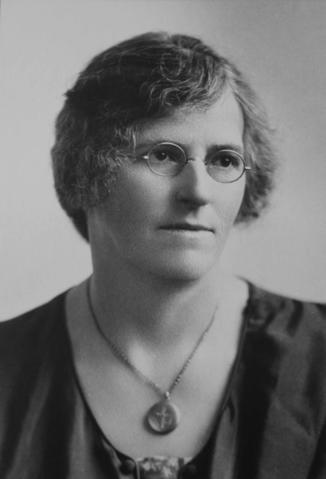
- Kirk in 1921

Winnipeg City Councillor for Ward 2
- In office 1920–1922

Personal details
- Born: 1877 Chesterfield, England
- Died: 2 December 1965 (aged 87–88)

Jessie Lennox Kirk (1877 — 2 December 1965) was a Canadian alderwoman. In 1920, Kirk became the first ever woman to be elected in the Winnipeg City Council. After her defeat in 1922, she ran for re-election multiple times from the 1920s to 1940s but did not win back her seat. Apart from her municipal career, Kirk was the nominee of the Dominion Labour Party for the 1920 Manitoba general election but was replaced due to a desire by the party leadership to nominate imprisoned leaders of the Winnipeg general strike.

== Early life and education ==
In 1877, Kirk was born in Chesterfield, England into a family with ten siblings. For her post-secondary education, she trained as a student-teacher in Derbyshire before going to Kingston College on a scholarship.

== Career ==
Kirk began her career as a teacher when she and her family moved to Canada after World War I. During the 1910s, she taught in Lockport, Manitoba before teaching at multiple schools in Winnipeg. While teaching, she went into politics as a member of a labour council. In 1918, Kirk was informed that she no longer had a job as a teacher. She was given back her job when the labour council she was on objected to her firing.

The following year, she ran for a seat on the Winnipeg School Board during the 1919 municipal election but did not win. In 1920, Kirk was selected as the nominee for the Dominion Labour Party at the Manitoba general election. However, she was replaced due to the Winnipeg general strike. At the end of 1920, Kirk was elected to the Winnipeg municipal council for Ward 2 and became the first woman to ever serve in the Winnipeg City Council.

After losing her seat in the 1922 municipal election, Kirk subsequently ran for re-election multiple times throughout the 1920s and 1930s. She ran with the Conservative Women’s League and failed to win back her seat. As an independent candidate, Kirk ran during the 1941 municipal election for the Ward 2 seat that Charles Rhodes Smith had relinquished. She came in second place and was defeated by Ernest E. Halloquist.

== Death ==
Kirk died on 2 December 1965.
