= 1965 Winnipeg municipal election =

The 1965 Winnipeg municipal election was held on October 27, 1965 to elect mayors, councillors and school trustees in the City of Winnipeg and its suburban communities. There were also referendums in some committees. There was no mayoral election in Winnipeg itself.

== Results ==
=== Winnipeg ===
Edith Tennant, D.A. Mulligan, Mark Danzker, Lloyd Stinson, William McGarva, Alan Wade, Slaw Rebchuk, Donovan Swailes and Joseph Zuken were elected to two-year terms on the Winnipeg City Council.

=== St. Vital ===
1965 St. Vital municipal election: Mayor
Candidate	Votes	%
Jack Hardy	4,732	59.62
A. Alvin Winslow	1,619	20.40
(x)Harry Collins	1,297	16.34
J. Harry Graham	289	3.64
Total valid votes	7,937	100.00
