= Cybercrime in Canada =

Computer related crime in Canada

Computer crime, or cybercrime in Canada, is an evolving international phenomenon. People and businesses in Canada and other countries may be affected by computer crimes that may, or may not originate within the borders of their country. From a Canadian perspective, 'computer crime' may be considered to be defined by the Council of Europe – Budapest Convention on Cybercrime (November 23, 2001). Canada contributed, and is a signatory, to this international of criminal offences involving the use of computers:

- Offences against the confidentiality, integrity and availability of computer data and systems;
- Computer-related offences;
- Content-related offences;
- Offences related to infringements of copyright and related rights; and
- Ancillary liability.

Canada is also a signatory to the Additional Protocol to the Convention on Cybercrime, concerning the criminalization of acts of a racist and xenophobic nature committed through computer systems (January 28, 2003). As of July 25, 2008 Canada had not yet ratified the Convention on Cybercrime or the Additional Protocol to the Convention on cybercrime, concerning the criminalization of acts of a Discriminatory nature committed through computer systems.

== Canadian computer crime laws ==
The Criminal Code contains a set of laws dealing with computer crime issues.

=== Criminal Offences Contained in the Convention on Cybercrime (November 23, 2001) ===
As Canada has not yet ratified the Budapest Convention on Cybercrime its Criminal Code may not fully address the areas of criminal law set out in the Convention on Cybercrime.

==== Computer-related offences ====
- Computer-related forgery
- Computer-related fraud

==== Content-related offences ====
- Offences related to child pornography

==== Ancillary liability ====
- Attempt and aiding or abetting
- Corporate liability

==== Criminal offences in the Additional Protocol to the Convention on Cybercrime ====
As Canada has not yet ratified this Additional Protocol to the Convention on cybercrime, its Criminal Code may not fully address the following criminal offences:

- Dissemination of racist and xenophobic material through computer systems
- Racist and xenophobic motivated threat
- Racist and xenophobic motivated insult
- Denial, gross minimization, approval or justification of genocide or crimes against humanity
- Aiding and abetting

==== Laws ====
- Criminal Code
- Criminal code section 342|Section 342 of the Criminal Code deals with theft, forgery of credit cards and unauthorized use of computer
- Section 184 of the Criminal Code deals with privacy
- Section 402 of the Criminal Code deals with Identity theft
- Section 403 of the Criminal Code deals with Identity fraud
- Section 83.18 of the Canadian Criminal Code defines the offense of participating in or contributing to any activity of a terrorist group. While the section does not use the specific term "cyberterrorism," it criminalizes actions that would include the use of cyberspace for terrorist purposes, and it is a key provision in Canada's legal framework against terrorism.

== Canadian computer criminals ==
- The Canadian hacker group 'The Brotherhood of Warez' hacked the Canadian Broadcasting Corporation's website on April 20, 1997; replacing the homepage with the message "The Media Are Liars"
