= Lists of the largest cities in Canada =

List of the largest cities in Canada may refer to:

== By population ==
- List of the largest municipalities in Canada by population, municipalities ranging from cities to rural districts
- List of the largest population centres in Canada, population centres (formerly urban areas) based on continuous population density, regardless of municipal boundaries
- List of census metropolitan areas and agglomerations in Canada, metropolitan areas as defined by Statistics Canada

== By area ==
- List of the largest cities and towns in Canada by area

== See also ==
- List of largest Canadian cities by census, historical population data
