= List of candidates of the 2023 Manitoba general election =

The 2023 Manitoba general election was held on October 3, 2023 to elect members to the Legislative Assembly of Manitoba. Below is a list of candidates who ran in the election, ordered by riding.

== Candidates by riding ==
† = not seeking re-election
‡ = running for re-election in different constituency
bold indicates party leader

=== Northern Manitoba ===
Electoral district	Candidates				Incumbent
Electoral district	PC	NDP	Liberal	Keystone	Incumbent
Flin Flon	Charlotte Larocque	Tom Lindsey			Tom Lindsey
Keewatinook	Michael Birch	Ian Bushie	Nellie Monias		Ian Bushie
Swan River	Rick Wowchuk	Andy Maxwell		Donnan McKenna	Rick Wowchuk
The Pas-Kameesak	Alan Mclauchlan	Amanda Lathlin	Alvina Rundle		Amanda Lathlin
Thompson	Linda Markus	Eric Redhead	Roy Jemison		Eric Redhead

=== Westman/Parkland ===
Electoral district	Candidates					Incumbent
Electoral district	PC	NDP	Liberal	Green	Keystone	Incumbent
Agassiz	Jodie Byram	Danica Wiggins	Richard Davies		Mark Wilson	Eileen Clarke†
Turtle Mountain	Doyle Piwniuk	Lorna Canada-Vanegas Mesa	Ali Tarar		**Kevin Friesen**	Doyle Piwniuk
Brandon East	Len Isleifson	Glen Simard	Trenton Zazalak			Len Isleifson
Brandon West	Wayne Balcaen	Quentin Robinson		Bill Marsh		Reg Helwer†
Dauphin	Gordon Wood	Ron Kostyshyn				Brad Michaleski†
Riding Mountain	Greg Nesbitt	Wayne Chacun	Eileen Smerchanski			Greg Nesbitt
Spruce Woods	Grant Jackson	Melissa Ghidoni	Michelle Budiwski			Cliff Cullen†

=== Central Manitoba ===
Electoral district	Candidates					Incumbent
Electoral district	PC	NDP	Liberal	Green	Keystone	Incumbent
Borderland	Josh Guenter	Rick Derksen	Loren Braul			Josh Guenter
Interlake-Gimli	Derek Johnson	Sarah Pinsent-Bardarson	Sean James		Larry Brandt	Derek Johnson
Lakeside	Trevor King	Dan Rugg	Neil Stewart			Ralph Eichler†
Midland	Lauren Stone	Hannah Drudge	James Kane			Blaine Pedersen†
Morden-Winkler	Carrie Hiebert	Ken Friesen	Mattison Froese			Vacant
Springfield-Ritchot	Ron Schuler	Tammy Ivanco	Trevor Kirczenow			Ron Schuler
Portage la Prairie	Jeff Bereza	Acacia Weselake	Ralph Dooley	Arishya Aggarwal		Ian Wishart†

=== Eastman ===
Electoral district	Candidates					Incumbent
Electoral district	PC	NDP	Liberal	Green	Keystone	Incumbent
Dawson Trail	Bob Lagassé	Chris Wiebe		Marcel Broesky		Bob Lagassé
Lac du Bonnet	Wayne Ewasko	Kathy Majowski		Blair Mahaffy		Wayne Ewasko
La Verendrye	Konrad Narth	Bianca Siem	Monica Guetre		Matthew Wiebe	Dennis Smook†
Steinbach	Kelvin Goertzen	Gord Meneer	Cyndy Friesen	Gabrielle Simard-Nadeau (withdrawn) (Note: "Any votes cast for the candidate during advance voting and on election day will be counted as rejected.")		Kelvin Goertzen
Red River North	Jeff Wharton	Alicia Hill				Jeff Wharton
Selkirk	Richard Perchotte	Mitch Obach				Alan Lagimodiere†

=== Northwest Winnipeg ===
Electoral district	Candidates				Incumbent
Electoral district	PC	NDP	Liberal	Independent	Incumbent
Burrows	Navraz Brar	Diljeet Brar	Garry Alejo		Diljeet Brar
Kildonan-River East	Alana Vannahme	Rachelle Schott	Ian MacIntyre		Cathy Cox†
McPhillips	Sheilah Restall	Jasdeep (JD) Devgan	Umar Hayat		Shannon Martin†
Point Douglas	Najiha Ali	Bernadette Smith	Jerald Funk		Bernadette Smith
St. Johns	Teddy Rubenstein	Nahanni Fontaine	Dennis Yaeger	Patrick Allard	Nahanni Fontaine
The Maples	Sumit Chawla	Mintu Sandhu	Eddie Calisto-Tavares		Mintu Sandhu
Tyndall Park	Christopher Santos	Kelly Legaspi	Cindy Lamoureux		Cindy Lamoureux

=== Northeast Winnipeg ===
Electoral district	Candidates					Incumbent
Electoral district	PC	NDP	Liberal	Green	Communist	Incumbent
Concordia	Alex Rogers	Matt Wiebe	Trish Rawsthorne			Matt Wiebe
Elmwood	Josh Okello	Jim Maloway	Donovan DeBattista	Nicolas Geddert	German Lombana	Jim Maloway
Radisson	James Teitsma	Jelynn Dela Cruz	Jean Luc Bouché			James Teitsma
Rossmere	Andrew Micklefield	Tracy Schmidt	Mike Chapin	Devlin Hinchey		Andrew Micklefield
St. Boniface	Kirt Hayer	Robert Loiselle	Dougald Lamont		Damon Bath	**Dougald Lamont**
Transcona	Titi Tijani	Nello Altomare	Arthur Bloomfield			Nello Altomare

=== West Winnipeg ===
Electoral district	Candidates				Incumbent
Electoral district	PC	NDP	Liberal	Green	Incumbent
Assiniboia	Scott Johnston	Nellie Kennedy	Charles Ward		Scott Johnston
Roblin	Kathleen Cook	Madelaine Dwyer	Detlev Regelsky		Myrna Driedger†
Kirkfield Park	Kevin Klein	Logan Oxenham	Rhonda Nichol	Dennis Bayomi	Kevin Klein
St. James	Tim Diack	Adrien Sala	Randell Cacayuran		Adrien Sala
Tuxedo	Heather Stefanson	Larissa Ashdown	Marc Brandson		**Heather Stefanson**

=== Central Winnipeg ===
Electoral district	Candidates					Incumbent
Electoral district	PC	NDP	Liberal	Green	Communist	Incumbent
Fort Garry	Rick Shone	Mark Wasyliw	Shandi Strong	Aaron Kowal		Mark Wasyliw
Fort Rouge	Rejeanne Caron	Wab Kinew	Katherine Johnson		Robert Crooks	**Wab Kinew**
Notre Dame	Murarrah Waheed	Malaya Marcelino	Winston Wuttunee	Micah Dewey	**Andrew Taylor**	Malaya Marcelino
River Heights	Timothy Burt	Mike Moroz	Jon Gerrard	Nathan Zahn		Jon Gerrard
Union Station	Aaron Croning	Uzoma Asagwara	Iqra Tariq			Uzoma Asagwara
Wolseley	Michele Leuzzi	Lisa Naylor	Philip Spevack	**Janine Gibson**	Cam Scott	Lisa Naylor

=== South Winnipeg ===
Electoral district	Candidates					Incumbent
Electoral district	PC	NDP	Liberal	Green	Independent	Incumbent
Fort Richmond	Paramjit Shahi	Jennifer Chen	Ernie Nathaniel			Sarah Guillemard†
Fort Whyte	Obby Khan	Trudy Schroeder	Willard Reaves			Obby Khan
Lagimodière	Andrew Smith	Tyler Blashko	Walt Nilsson			Andrew Smith
Riel	Rochelle Squires	Mike Moyes	Léamber Kensley			Rochelle Squires
Seine River	Janice Morley-Lecomte	Billie Cross	James Bloomfield		Martin Jiri Stadler	Janice Morley-Lecomte
Southdale	Audrey Gordon	Renée Cable	Robert-Falcon Ouellette		Amarjit Singh	Audrey Gordon
St. Vital	Saima Aziz	Jamie Moses	Peter Bastians			Jamie Moses
Waverley	Jon Reyes	David Pankratz	Uche Nwankwo	Manjit Kaur Gill		Jon Reyes
