= Kinew ministry =

Cabinet of Manitoba since 2023

- 25th ministry of Manitoba
- 2023–present
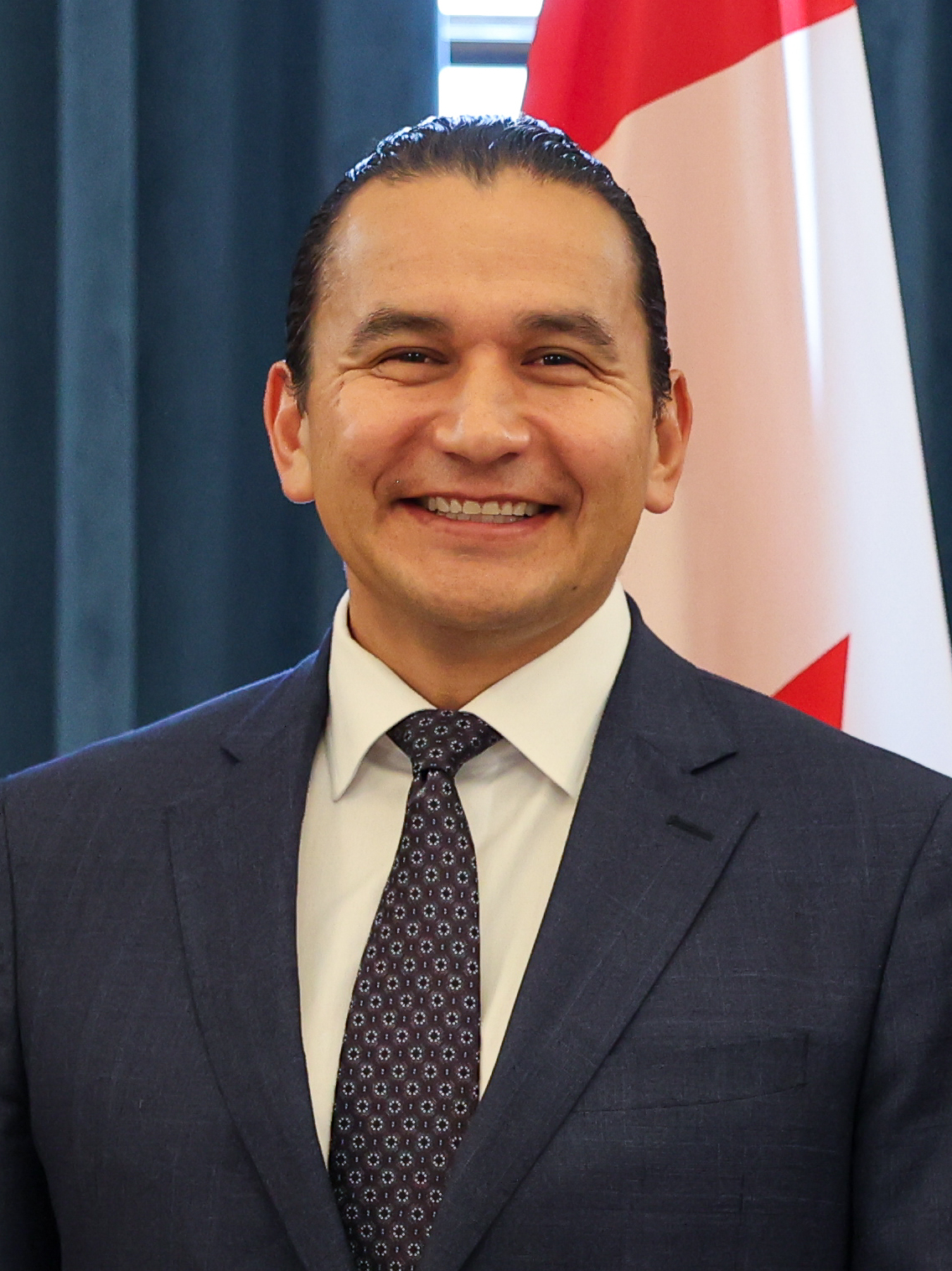
- Kinew in 2023
- Date formed: October 18, 2023

People and organisations
- Monarch: Charles III
- Lieutenant governor: Anita Neville
- Premier: Wab Kinew
- Deputy Premier: Uzoma Asagwara
- Member party: New Democratic
- Status in legislature: Majority
- Opposition party: Progressive Conservative
- Opposition leader: Heather Stefanson (2023–2024); Wayne Ewasko (2024–2025); Obby Khan (2025–2026); Konrad Narth (2026–present)

History
- Election: 2023
- Legislature term: 43rd Manitoba Legislature
- Predecessor: Stefanson ministry

The Kinew ministry is the cabinet that has governed Manitoba since October 18, 2023. It is led by Wab Kinew, the 25th Premier of Manitoba, and first First Nations premier of the province. The cabinet replaced the Stefanson ministry, after the Manitoba New Democratic Party defeated the Progressive Conservatives in the 2023 Manitoba general election.

Formed on October 18, 2023, it was initially composed of 15 members, 11 incumbent MLAs and four newly elected members. On November 13, 2024, the cabinet added three additional ministers and saw several incumbent ministers assume new or redefined roles.

The shuffle was highlighted by the appointment of River Heights MLA Mike Moroz as Minister of Innovation and New Technology. Moroz would head the newly created Manitoba Department of Innovation and Technology with the aim of "supporting Manitoba’s strong tech sector and help new and existing businesses in this industry grow".

== Cabinet members ==
=== By minister ===
The list below follows the Manitoba order of precedence, which orders members of the Executive Council in relative seniority of appointment.

Minister	Portfolio	Tenure
Wab Kinew	Premier of Manitoba (President of the Executive Council)	October 18, 2023 – present
Wab Kinew	Minister of Intergovernmental Affairs and International Relations	October 18, 2023 – present
Wab Kinew	Minister responsible for Indigenous reconciliation	October 18, 2023 – present
Uzoma Asagwara	Deputy Premier	October 18, 2023 – present
Uzoma Asagwara	Minister of Health, Seniors, and Long-term care	October 18, 2023 – present
Ron Kostyshyn	Minister of Agriculture	October 18, 2023 – present
Matt Wiebe	Minister of Justice and Attorney General	October 18, 2023 – present
Matt Wiebe	Keeper of the Great Seal of the province of Manitoba	October 18, 2023 – present
Matt Wiebe	Minister responsible for the Manitoba Public Insurance Corporation	October 18, 2023 – present
Nahanni Fontaine	Minister of Families	October 18, 2023 – present
Nahanni Fontaine	Minister responsible for Accessibility	October 18, 2023 – present
Nahanni Fontaine	Minister responsible for Women and Gender Equity	October 18, 2023 – present
Bernadette Smith	Minister of Housing, Addictions, and Homelessness	October 18, 2023 – present
Bernadette Smith	Minister responsible for Mental Health	October 18, 2023 – present
Nello Altomare	Minister of Education and Early Childhood Learning	October 18, 2023 – January 14, 2025
Ian Bushie	Minister of Municipal and Northern Relations	October 18, 2023 – November 13, 2024
Ian Bushie	Minister of Indigenous Economic Development	October 18, 2023 – November 13, 2024
Ian Bushie	Minister of Natural Resources and Indigenous Futures	November 13, 2024 – present
Malaya Marcelino	Minister of Labour and Immigration	October 18, 2023 – present
Malaya Marcelino	Minister responsible for the Workers Compensation Board	October 18, 2023 – present
Jamie Moses	Minister of Economic Development, Investment, Trade and Natural Resources	October 18, 2023 – present
Jamie Moses	Minister of Business, Mining, Trade, and Job Creation	November 13, 2024 – present
Lisa Naylor	Minister of Transportation and Infrastructure	October 18, 2023 – present
Lisa Naylor	Minister of Consumer Protection and Government Services	October 18, 2023 – November 13, 2024
Adrien Sala	Minister of Finance	October 18, 2023 – present
Adrien Sala	Minister responsible for the Public Service Commission	October 18, 2023 – present
Adrien Sala	Minister responsible for Manitoba Hydro	October 18, 2023 – present
Renée Cable	Minister of Advanced Education and Training	October 18, 2023 – present
Tracy Schmidt	Minister of Environment and Climate	October 18, 2023 – January 23, 2025
Tracy Schmidt	Minister responsible For Efficiency Manitoba	October 18, 2023 – January 23, 2025
Tracy Schmidt	Minister of Education and Early Childhood Learning	January 23, 2025 – present
Glen Simard	Minister of Sport, Culture, Heritage and Tourism	October 18, 2023 – November 13, 2024
Glen Simard	Minister responsible for Francophone Affairs	October 18, 2023 – present
Glen Simard	Minister responsible for Manitoba Liquor and Lotteries Corporation	October 18, 2023 – present
Glen Simard	Minister of Municipal and Northern Relations	November 13, 2024 – present
Mintu Sandhu	Minister of Public Service Delivery	November 13, 2024 – present
Nellie Kennedy	Minister of Sport, Culture and Heritage	November 13, 2024 – present
Mike Moroz	Minister of Innovation and New Technology	November 13, 2024 – present
Mike Moyes	Minister of Environment and Climate	January 23, 2025 – present
Carla Compton	Minister Responsible for Accessibility	September 28, 2026 – present
David Pankratz	Minister responsible for First Responder Initiatives	September 28, 2026 – present

Ministries of Manitoba
Preceded by 24th Manitoban Ministry (Stefanson)	25th Manitoban Ministry (Kinew); 2023–present	Succeeded by Incumbent
