= Executive Council of Manitoba =

Cabinet of the Canadian province of Manitoba

The Executive Council of Manitoba (French: Conseil exécutif du Manitoba), more commonly known as the Cabinet of Manitoba, is the cabinet of the Canadian province of Manitoba. As of 2023, the current cabinet are members of the New Democratic Party, and have been since 2023.

Almost always made up of members of the Legislative Assembly of Manitoba, the Cabinet is similar in structure and role to the Cabinet of Canada while being smaller in size. As federal and provincial responsibilities differ, there are a number of different portfolios between the federal and provincial governments.

The Lieutenant Governor of Manitoba, as representative of the King in Right of Manitoba, heads the council, and is referred to as the Governor-in-Council. Other members of the Cabinet, who advise (or minister) the vice-regal, are selected by the Premier of Manitoba and appointed by the Lieutenant-Governor. Most cabinet ministers are the head of a ministry, but this is not always the case.

== Current cabinet ==
Cabinet Ministers of Manitoba, 2023
Lieutenant Governor
Her Honour the Honourable Anita Neville		2022 to present
Portfolio	Minister	Cabinet Minister since
Premier of Manitoba; President of the Executive Council; Minister of Intergovernmental Affairs and International Relations; Minister responsible for Indigenous reconciliation	Wab Kinew	2023
Deputy Premier	Uzoma Asagwara	2023
Minister of Health, Seniors, and Long-term care	Uzoma Asagwara	2023
Minister of Finance	Adrien Sala	2023
Minister responsible for the Public Service Commission	Adrien Sala	2023
Minister responsible for Manitoba Hydro	Adrien Sala	2023
Minister of Justice and Attorney General	Matt Wiebe	2023
Keeper of the Great Seal of the province of Manitoba	Matt Wiebe	2023
Minister responsible for the Manitoba Public Insurance Corporation	Matt Wiebe	2023
Minister of Families	Nahanni Fontaine	2023
Minister responsible for Accessibility	Nahanni Fontaine	2023
Minister responsible for Women and Gender Equity	Nahanni Fontaine	2023
Minister of Economic Development, Investment, Trade and Natural Resources	Jamie Moses	2023
Minister of Advanced Education and Training	Renée Cable	2023
Minister of Education and Early Childhood Learning	Tracy Schmidt	2023
Minister of Agriculture	Ron Kostyshyn	2023
Minister of Labour and Immigration	Malaya Marcelino	2023
Minister responsible for the Workers Compensation Board	Malaya Marcelino	2023
Minister of Transportation and Infrastructure	Lisa Naylor	2023
Minister of Consumer Protection and Government Services	Lisa Naylor	2023
Minister of Municipal and Northern Relations	Ian Bushie	2023
Minister of Indigenous Economic Development	Ian Bushie	2023
Minister of Housing, Addictions, and Homelessness	Bernadette Smith	2023
Minister responsible for Mental Health	Bernadette Smith	2023
Minister of Sport, Culture, Heritage and Tourism	Glen Simard	2023
Minister responsible for Francophone Affairs	Glen Simard	2023
Minister responsible for Manitoba Liquor and Lotteries Corporation	Glen Simard	2023
Minister of Environment and Climate	Mike Moyes	2025
Minister responsible For Efficiency Manitoba	Mike Moyes	2025

== Stefanson ministry ==
Stefanson ministry by portfolio
Portfolio	Minister	Tenure	
Portfolio	Minister	Start	End
Premier of Manitoba President of the Executive Council Minister of Intergovernmental Affairs and International Relations	Heather Stefanson	2 November 2021	18 October 2023
Deputy Premier	Rochelle Squires	2 November 2021	3 November 2021
Deputy Premier	Kelvin Goertzen	3 November 2021	18 January 2022
Deputy Premier	Cliff Cullen	18 January 2022	18 October 2023
Minister of Legislative and Public affairs	Kelvin Goertzen	2 November 2021	18 January 2022
Minister of Agriculture and Resource Development	Ralph Eichler	2 November 2021	18 January 2022
Minister of Education	Cliff Cullen	2 November 2021	18 January 2022

Lieutenant Governor
Her Honour The Honourable Anita Neville		2022 to 2023
Portfolio	Minister	Cabinet Minister since
Premier of Manitoba President of the Executive Council Minister of Intergovernmental Affairs and International Relations	Heather Stefanson	2021
Deputy Premier	Cliff Cullen	2016
Minister of Finance	Cliff Cullen	2016
Minister responsible for Manitoba Hydro	Cliff Cullen	2016
Minister of Justice and Attorney General	Kelvin Goertzen	2022
Keeper of the Great Seal of the Province of Manitoba	Kelvin Goertzen	2022
Minister Responsible for the Manitoba Public Insurance Corporation	Kelvin Goertzen	2022
Minister of Indigenous Reconciliation and Northern Relations	Eileen Clarke	2021
Minister of Families	Rochelle Squires	2021
Minister Responsible for Accessibility	Rochelle Squires	2016
Minister responsible for Francophone Affairs	Rochelle Squires	2016
Minister Responsible for Gender Equity Manitoba Secretariat	Rochelle Squires	2022
Minister of Economic Development, Investment and Trade	Jeff Wharton	2016
Minister of Advanced Education and Training	Sarah Guillemard	2019
Minister of Education and Early Childhood Learning	Wayne Ewasko	2021
Minister of Agriculture	Derek Johnson	2021
Minister of Health	Audrey Gordon	2021
Minister of Labour and Immigration	Jon Reyes	2021
Minister of Transportation and Infrastructure	Doyle Piwniuk	2022
Minister of Seniors and Long-term care	Scott Johnston	2022
Minister of Municipal Relations	Andrew Smith	2022
Minister responsible for Manitoba Liquor and Lotteries Corporation	Andrew Smith	2022
Minister of Natural Resources and Northern Development	Greg Nesbitt	2022
Minister of Mental Health and Community Wellness	Janice Morley-Lecomte	2023
Minister of Consumer Protection and Government Services	James Teitsma	2023
Minister responsible for the Public Service Commission	James Teitsma	2023
Minister Responsible for the Public Utilities Board	James Teitsma	2023
Minister of Sport, Culture and Heritage	Obby Khan	2023
Minister responsible for the Manitoba Centennial Centre Corporation	Obby Khan	2023
Minister responsible for Travel Manitoba	Obby Khan	2023
Minister of Environment and Climate	Kevin Klein	2023
Minister Responsible For Efficiency Manitoba	Kevin Klein	2023

== Goertzen ministry ==
Goertzen ministry by portfolio
Portfolio	Minister	Tenure	
Portfolio	Minister	Start	End
Premier of Manitoba: President of the Executive Council; Minister of Intergovernmental Affairs and International Relations	Kelvin Goertzen	1 September 2021	2 November 2021
Minister of Legislative and Public Affairs	Kelvin Goertzen	1 September 2021	2 November 2021
Deputy Premier of Manitoba	Rochelle Squires	1 September 2021	3 November 2021
Minister of Infrastructure	Ron Schuler	1 September 2021	2 November 2021
Minister of Agriculture and Resource Development	Ralph Eichler	1 September 2021	2 November 2021
Minister of Education	Cliff Cullen	1 September 2021	2 November 2021
Minister of Finance	Scott Fielding	1 September 2021	2 November 2021
Minister of Sport, Culture and Heritage: Minister responsible for Status of Women	Cathy Cox	1 September 2021	2 November 2021
Minister of Justice and Attorney General: Keeper of the Great Seal of the Province of Manitoba	Cameron Friesen	1 September 2021	2 November 2021
Minister of Families: Minister Responsible for Accessibility; Minister Responsible for Francophone Affairs	Rochelle Squires	1 September 2021	2 November 2021
Minister of Crown Services	Jeff Wharton	1 September 2021	2 November 2021
Minister of Central Services: Minister responsible for the Civil Service	Reg Helwer	1 September 2021	2 November 2021
Minister of Conservation and Climate	Sarah Guillemard	1 September 2021	2 November 2021
Minister of Advanced Education, Skills and Immigration	Wayne Ewasko	1 September 2021	2 November 2021
Minister of Municipal Relations	Derek Johnson	1 September 2021	2 November 2021
Minister of Health and Seniors Care	Audrey Gordon	1 September 2021	2 November 2021
Minister of Mental Health, Wellness and Recovery	Audrey Gordon	1 September 2021	2 November 2021
Minister of Indigenous Reconciliation and Northern Relations	Alan Lagimodiere	1 September 2021	2 November 2021
Minister of Economic Development and Jobs	Jon Reyes	1 September 2021	2 November 2021

== Pallister ministry ==
Pallister ministry by portfolio
Portfolio	Minister	Tenure	
Portfolio	Minister	Start	End
Premier of Manitoba; President of the Executive Council; Minister of Intergovernmental Affairs and International Relations	Brian Pallister	3 May 2016	1 September 2021
Deputy Premier of Manitoba	Heather Stefanson	3 May 2016	5 January 2021
Deputy Premier of Manitoba	Kelvin Goertzen	5 January 2021	1 September 2021
Minister of Legislative and Public Affairs	Kelvin Goertzen	5 January 2021	
Minister of Justice and Attorney General: Keeper of the Great Seal of the Province of Manitoba	Heather Stefanson	3 May 2016	1 August 2018
Minister of Justice and Attorney General: Keeper of the Great Seal of the Province of Manitoba	Cliff Cullen	1 August 2018	5 January 2021
Minister of Justice and Attorney General: Keeper of the Great Seal of the Province of Manitoba	Cameron Friesen	5 January 2021	18 January 2022
Minister of Finance	Cameron Friesen	3 May 2016	1 August 2018
Minister of Finance	Scott Fielding	1 August 2018	18 January 2022
Minister of Health, Seniors and Active Living	Kelvin Goertzen	3 May 2016	1 August 2018
Minister of Health, Seniors and Active Living	Cameron Friesen	1 August 2018	5 January 2021
Minister of Health and Seniors Care	Heather Stefanson	5 January 2021	18 August 2021
Minister of Health and Seniors Care	Audrey Gordon	18 August 2021	18 January 2022
Minister of Economic Development and Jobs	Ralph Eichler	5 January 2021	15 July 2021
Minister of Economic Development and Jobs	Jon Reyes	15 July 2021	18 January 2022
Minister of Education and Training	Ian Wishart	3 May 2016	1 August 2018
Minister of Education and Training	Kelvin Goertzen	1 August 2018	23 October 2019
Minister of Education	Kelvin Goertzen	23 October 2019	5 January 2021
Minister of Education	Cliff Cullen	5 January 2021	18 January 2022
Minister of Economic Development and Training	Ralph Eichler	23 October 2019	5 January 2021
Minister of Families	Scott Fielding	3 May 2016	1 August 2018
Minister of Families	Heather Stefanson	1 August 2018	5 January 2021
Minister of Families	Rochelle Squires	5 January 2021	18 October 2023
Minister of Infrastructure	Blaine Pedersen	3 May 2016	17 August 2017
Minister of Infrastructure	Ron Schuler	17 August 2017	30 December 2021
Minister of Indigenous and Municipal Relations	Eileen Clarke	3 May 2016	17 August 2017
Minister of Indigenous and Northern Relations	Eileen Clarke	17 August 2017	9 July 2021
Minister of Sustainable Development	Cathy Cox	3 May 2016	17 August 2017
Minister of Sustainable Development	Rochelle Squires	17 August 2017	23 October 2019
Minister of Growth, Enterprise and Trade	Cliff Cullen	3 May 2016	17 August 2017
Minister of Growth, Enterprise and Trade	Blaine Pedersen	17 August 2017	23 October 2019
Minister of Agriculture	Ralph Eichler	3 May 2016	23 October 2019
Minister of Agriculture and Resource Development	Blaine Pedersen	23 October 2019	15 July 2021
Minister of Agriculture and Resource Development	Ralph Eichler	15 July 2021	18 January 2022
Minister of Sport, Culture and Heritage	Rochelle Squires	3 May 2016	17 August 2017
Minister of Sport, Culture and Heritage	Cathy Cox	17 August 2017	18 January 2022
Minister of Crown Services	Ron Schuler	3 May 2016	17 August 2017
Minister of Crown Services	Cliff Cullen	17 August 2017	1 August 2018
Minister of Crown Services	Colleen Mayer	1 August 2018	25 September 2019
Minister of Crown Services	Jeff Wharton	25 September 2019	18 January 2022
Minister of Municipal Relations	Jeff Wharton	17 August 2017	23 October 2019
Minister of Municipal Relations	Rochelle Squires	23 October 2019	5 January 2021
Minister of Municipal Relations	Derek Johnson	5 January 2021	18 January 2022
Minister of Central Services	Reg Helwer	23 October 2019	18 January 2022
Minister of Conservation and Climate	Sarah Guillemard	23 October 2019	18 January 2022
Minister of Advanced Education, Skills and Immigration	Wayne Ewasko	5 January 2021	18 January 2022
Minister of Mental Health, Wellness and Recovery	Audrey Gordon	5 January 2021	18 January 2022
Minister of Indigenous Reconciliation and Northern Relations	Alan Lagimodiere	15 July 2021	30 January 2023
