= Gerry Ducharme =

Canadian politician

Member of the Legislative Assembly of Manitoba for Riel
- In office March 18, 1986 – April 25, 1995
- Preceded by: Doreen Dodick
- Succeeded by: David Newman

Personal details
- Born: March 21, 1939 (age 87) Winnipeg, Manitoba, Canada
- Party: Progressive Conservative Party of Manitoba
- Profession: insurance broker and real estate dealer

Gerald Ducharme (born March 21, 1939) is a former politician in Manitoba, Canada. He was a member of the Legislative Assembly of Manitoba from 1986 to 1995, and was a cabinet minister in the government of Progressive Conservative Premier Gary Filmon from 1988 to 1995.

== Early life and career ==
The son of Jean Louis Ducharme and Mackalena Andreychuk, Ducharme was born in Winnipeg in 1939. He was educated in St. Vital and at the University of Manitoba, and worked as an insurance broker and real estate dealer before entering public life. He was a member of the Winnipeg Real Estate Board and the Manitoba Brokers Association. He began his political career as a school trustee for the St. Vital School Board and was an alderman in Winnipeg from 1980 to 1986. He married Yvonne Normandeau in 1963.

== Political career ==
Ducharme was first elected to the Manitoba legislature in the 1986 provincial election, defeating incumbent New Democrat Doreen Dodick in the south-end Winnipeg seat of Riel. The NDP won the election, and Ducharme sat in the opposition benches for the next two years.

The NDP were unexpectedly defeated in the legislature in 1988, and the Progressive Conservatives managed to form a minority government after the election which followed. Ducharme faced a difficult challenge from Liberal Chris Sigurdson, winning by only 324 votes (the Liberals made strong inroads into both Tory and NDP ridings in this cycle). On May 9, 1988, Ducharme was appointed Manitoba Minister of Urban Affairs and Manitoba Minister of Housing.

Liberal support declined in the provincial election of 1990, and Ducharme was re-elected in Riel with an increased majority. Following a cabinet shuffle on February 5, 1991, he was named Manitoba Minister of Government Services, responsible for Seniors.

Ducharme resigned from cabinet on March 20, 1995, and was not a candidate in the subsequent election. He has not run for provincial or federal office since this time.

== Post political career ==
In 1998, Ducharme was made Chairman of the Manitoba Municipal Board. He stepped down from this position in 2000, shortly after the NDP under Gary Doer were returned to power.
