= Minister Responsible for Gender Equity (Manitoba) =

The Minister Responsible for Women and Gender Equity (French: Ministre responsable de l’Équité entre les sexes) oversees the Gender Equity Manitoba Secretariat under Manitoba's Department of Families.

Since 1982, the Executive Council of Manitoba has included a minister responsible for the Status of Women or Gender Equity; however, the position is not a full cabinet portfolio and has always been held by a minister who holds other cabinet responsibilities. The current Minister is Nahanni Fontaine, who is also the provincial Minister of Families.

Through the Minister, the independent, arm's-length Manitoba Gender Equity Council (MGEC) advises the Government of Manitoba on matters regarding Gender Equity.

== Gender Equity Manitoba Secretariat ==
Women and Gender Equity Manitoba
- Équité entre les sexes Manitoba

Agency overview
- Formed: 1982
- Preceding agency: Gender equity Manitoba
- Headquarters: 409-401 York Avenue, Winnipeg, MB
- Minister responsible: Nahanni Fontaine, Minister of Families; Minister responsible for Gender Equity Manitoba Secretariat
- Parent department: Department of Families
- Website: www.gov.mb.ca/msw/index.html

The Gender Equity Manitoba Secretariat (Gender Equity Manitoba, GEM; French: Équité entre les sexes Manitoba) is responsible for promoting "gender equality and the equal participation of all within society;" improving "the economic, legal, social and health status of Gender Equity seeking groups;" and contributing "to ending exploitation and violence against women." GEM concerns itself with the current status of Manitoba's 2SLGBTQIA+ Community and other groups in such key areas as education, employment, health, and violence against 2SLGBTQ People, as well as providing the public with information on how women are fairing in such areas.

=== History ===
In 1972, the Women's Bureau was created within Manitoba's Department of Labour in order to provide information and assistance to working women or those planning to enter the labour force. In 1984, the Bureau was restructured, renamed Manitoba Women's Directorate, and tasked with supporting the Minister responsible for the Status of Women. The Directorate would work to influence government decision-making to facilitate the integration of women's concerns in public policy and legislation; conducted research and policy analysis of women's issues, as well as raising awareness for such; worked with government departments and community members to promote measures meant to help women achieve equality; and generated government initiatives that reflected priorities of Manitoba women.

Between 2008 and 2009, employees of the Women's Directorate were consolidated with those of the Manitoba Women's Advisory Council (MWAC) as part of the Manitoba Status of Women Division. Whereas MWAC would continue working as a distinct entity, the Women's Directorate was subsumed within the new division.

In 2012, the Directorate, along with the Women's Advisory Council, came under the jurisdiction of the newly-formed Department of Family Services and Labour.

== Manitoba Gender Equity Council ==
The Manitoba Gender Equity Council (MGEC) is an independent, arm's-length organization that advises the Government of Manitoba on matters regarding the Gender Equity, through the Minister responsible for Gender Equity Manitoba. The Council consists of a chairperson and up to 18 members, all appointed by Lieutenant-Governor-in Council. Barbara Bowes is the current chairperson of the Council (current as of January 2021).

In 1980, the Manitoba Women's Advisory Council on the Status of Women was established by the provincial government by Order-in-Council. The Council's permanence as an independent, arms-length advisory body would be ensured through the passing of the Manitoba Advisory Council on the Status of Women's Act was passed in 1987. The Council's name was changed to its current title in 1992 with the passage of the Manitoba Women's Advisory Council Act.

In 2004, the Council was placed under the Department of Labour's purview while maintaining its arm's-length role. Between 2008 and 2009, the staff of the Women's Directorate were integrated with the staff of the Council as part of the Manitoba Status of Women Division, however the Manitoba Women's Advisory Council continues to operate as a distinct entity.

In 2012, the Council, along with the Status of Women Directorate, came under the wing of the newly-formed Department of Family Services and Labour. The following year, with the Department of Family Services and Labour was yet again separating into individual departments, the Women's Advisory Council was placed under the jurisdiction of Family Services.

In 2023 the Women's Advisory Council was renamed to be the Gender Equity Council.

== List of ministers responsible for the status of women ==
Ministers responsible for the status of women
Name	Party	Took office	Left office
Mary Beth Dolin	NDP	July 19, 1982	January 30, 1985
Muriel Smith	NDP	January 30, 1985	April 17, 1986
Judy Wasylycia-Leis	NDP	April 17, 1986	September 21, 1987
Muriel Smith	NDP	September 21, 1987	May 9, 1988
Charlotte Oleson	PC	May 9, 1988	April 21, 1989
Gerrie Hammond	PC	April 21, 1989	September 11, 1990
Bonnie Mitchelson	PC	February 5, 1991	September 10, 1993
Rosemary Vodrey	PC	September 10, 1993	October 5, 1999
Diane McGifford	NDP	October 5, 1999	November 4, 2003
Nancy Allan	NDP	November 4, 2003	November 3, 2009
Jennifer Howard	NDP	November 3, 2009	January 13, 2012
Jennifer Howard	NDP	January 13, 2012	October 18, 2013
Kerri Irvin-Ross	NDP	October 18, 2013	May 3, 2016
Rochelle Squires	PC	May 3, 2016	October 23, 2019
Cathy Cox	PC	October 23, 2019	January 18, 2022
Rochelle Squires	PC	January 18, 2022	May 23, 2023
Ministers responsible for Gender Equity Secretariat
Rochelle Squires	PC	May 23, 2022	October 18, 2023
Nahanni Fontaine	NDP	October 18, 2023	incumbent
