= Manitoba Confederation of Regions Party candidates in the 1986 Manitoba provincial election =

The Manitoba Confederation of Regions Party ran several candidates in the 1986 provincial election, none of whom were elected. Information about these candidates may be found on this page.

== Al MacDonald (River East) ==
MacDonald worked in engineering technical support, and campaigned for the Confederation of Regions Party at the federal and provincial levels.

Electoral record
Election	Division	Party	Votes	%	Place	Winner
1984 federal	Winnipeg South	Confederation of Regions	1,069	2.05	4/6	Bill Blaikie, New Democratic Party
1986 provincial	River East	Confederation of Regions	280		4/5	Bonnie Mitchelson, Progressive Conservative
