= Manitoba Conservation and Climate =

Manitoba Environment and Climate Change
- Ministère de l'Environnement et Climat

Department overview
- Formed: 2016
- Preceding agencies: Department of Sustainable Development; Department of Conservation and Water Stewardship; Department of Conservation; Department of Conservation and Climate; Department of Environment, Climate and Parks
- Jurisdiction: Government of Manitoba
- Headquarters: Winnipeg, Manitoba
- Employees: 1,688 (1,053.57 FTE) (2009-2010)
- Annual budget: CAD$135 million (2009-2010)
- Minister responsible: Mike Moyes, Minister of Environment and Climate Change
- Deputy Minister responsible: Jocelyn Baker, Deputy Minister of Environment and Climate Change
- Website: www.gov.mb.ca/sd/index.html

Manitoba Environment and Climate Change (or Department of Environment and Climate Change, French: Ministère de l'Environnement et Climat; formerly the Department of Conservation and Climate) is a department of the Government of Manitoba that is responsible for the management and protection of Manitoba's wildlife, water, species at risk, forestry, and other matters related to environmental stewardship and Manitoba's biodiversity of natural resources.

The department is overseen by the Minister of Environment and Climate, who is currently Mike Moyes, as of January 2025.

The department previously also held the responsibility for identifying, establishing, and managing Manitoba's system of provincial parks, ecological reserves, and protected areas, but this has since been moved to the Department of Natural Resources and Northern Development.

== Department overview ==
Responsibilities of the department include ensuring the sustainability of natural resources for Manitobans, upholding and ensuring the continuance of Treaty and Indigenous rights, and providing for basic resource needs for subsistence users. The department also protects people, property, and resource values from wildfires as well as the adverse effects of other natural and human-caused events.

In terms of economic development and well-being, the Department of Conservation and Climate manages commercial use of natural resources by providing land-, water-, and resource-based opportunities and by supporting community initiatives through grant funding programs.

=== Divisions and responsibilities ===
- Climate, Environment, and Biodiversity: works on reducing and managing the impact that people have on the environment, as well as conserving Manitoba's rich diversity of plants and animals. This division's initiative's priorities, programs, legislation, and actions, focus on the following areas:
  - Air quality management
  - Climate change
  - Pollution prevention
  - Pesticide use
  - Management of protected areas
  - Protection of at risk species
  - Biodiversity conservation
  - Management of invasive species
  - Ecological reserve programs
  - Storage and handling of hazardous products like petroleum
- Finance and Crown Lands: provides executive management of programs and management services, including financial, information services, administrative support, planning, and policy development; management of Crown land and related programs; facilitation of the engagement of Indigenous people in the department's activities; and stewardship of Manitoba's shared geospatial technology and information assets.
- Environmental Stewardship: ensures the development, implementation, and coordination of government-wide climate change programs; ensures the development and coordination of strategic policy initiatives for the department; ensures the management and implementation of the environmental policy, program, and enforcement functions for the department; ensures that environmental impacts of developments are evaluated; and ensures the delivery of emergency-response programming related to environmental emergencies.
- Water Stewardship & Biodiversity: develops, administers, and implements policies, programs, legislation and regulations in order to:
  - ensure that the Crown-owned forest land is managed to provide sustainable resource base and quality seedings for existing and future harvest operations and an adequate forest cover for conservation and land resources
  - ensure that wildlife and its habitat are protected and managed sustainably
  - protect, maintain and, where necessary, rehabilitate the quality of Manitoba's ecosystems habitat
  - manage resources in such a way that: ensures that viable population stocks are maintained and that allocation for resource harvesting is fair; resolves or minimizes conflict between competing uses; and optimizes the long-term economic and social benefits to Manitobans
  - ensure the continued safety of drinking water provided to Manitobans
  - implement regulatory programs to control and manage land drainage and water retention projects while protecting wetlands and downstream properties;
  - sustainably allocate the use of water for such purposes as municipal drinking water, industrial purposes, irrigation, etc., and for the generation of hydroelectricity
  - take on scientific studies, short and long-term monitoring programs, and various data-collection activities that ensure the sound, sustainable, and scientifically based management of Manitoba's water, wildlife, fisheries, and forestry resources
  - develop and implement a system for integrated watershed management planning on watershed basis in Manitoba
- Waste Management: ensures that waste is "handled in a responsible manner" that preserves Manitoba's environment and protects its natural resources.

== History ==
In 1928, the Department of Mines and Natural Resources was established by passage of The Mines and Natural Resources Act. It was created to oversee the extraction of Manitoba's mineral resources, but its mandate rapidly extended to include the protection, conservation, administration, and development of the province's mineral resources, forests, fisheries, wildlife, water resources, recreational services, and tourism opportunities. The Department's creation, like the appointment of a Mines Commissioner in 1927, was in preparation for the official transfer of jurisdiction over resources from the federal Department of the Interior. This transfer took place in 1930 with passage of the Manitoba Natural Resources Act.

The Department of Mines, Resources and Environmental Management, created in 1971, was mandated to maximize the economic, social, scientific, and cultural growth of Manitoba through administering, managing, protecting, and husbanding the natural resources and environment of Manitoba. A re-organized Department of Mines, Resources and Environmental Management was created in 1976 and was responsible for managing Manitoba's non-renewable water and mineral resources, as well as for managing pollution and the impact of non-renewable resource use to ensure clean air, soil, and water.

The Department of Renewable Resources and Transportation Services was created in 1976 when the functions of the former Department of Mines, Resources and Environmental Management were divided between two new departments in 1975. This Department was responsible for research, policy development, planning, and management of renewable resources such as forests, fisheries, and wildlife; for programs carried out by field staff in these three resource areas, for lands, surveys and mapping; and for the operation of the provincial government's Air Division.

The Department of Mines, Natural Resources and Environment was created in 1978, taking on all the functions of the former Department of Mines, Resources and Environmental Management, the renewable resource functions of the former Department of Renewable Resources and Transportation Services, and the Parks Branch (renamed the Parks and Natural Areas Branch in 1992) of the former Department of Tourism, Recreation and Cultural Affairs.

The new Department of Natural Resources was created in 1979 and assumed all functions of the former Department of Mines, Natural Resources and Environment, except those concerned with minerals, which were transferred to the Department of Energy and Mines, and those concerned with environmental management, which were transferred to the Department of Consumer and Corporate Affairs and Environment.

The Department of Conservation (French: Ministère du Conservation et Climat) was created in 1999, by a merging of the Ministry of Environment and Department of Natural Resources, as well as the functions associated with petroleum and energy from the former Department of Energy and Mines. In 2001, the department's functions related to petroleum and natural gas were transferred to the Department of Industry, Trade and Mines. In 2002 the Climate Change Branch of the Department of Conservation was transferred to the new Department of Energy, Science and Technology. In 2004, the functions of the Water and Fisheries Branches were transferred to the Department of Water Stewardship.

On 13 January 2012, the Department of Conservation and Water Stewardship (French: Ministère de la Conservation et de la Gestion des ressources hydriques) was created with the merging of the Department of Conservation with the Department of Water Stewardship. In 2016, Conservation and Water Stewardship became the Department of Sustainable Development.

== See also ==
- Minister of Conservation and Climate Change
- Environment and Climate Change Canada
- Forestry in Canada
