= Manitoba Liberal Party candidates in the 1988 Manitoba provincial election =

The Manitoba Liberal Party ran a full slate of 57 candidates in the 1988 provincial election, and elected twenty Members of the Legislative Assembly to become the Official Opposition party.

Several of the party's candidates have their own biography pages. Information about others may be found on this page.

== Candidates ==
| Riding | Candidates Name | Notes | Residence | Occupation | Votes | % | Rank |
|---|---|---|---|---|---|---|---|
| Arthur | Douglas Mosset | | | | 2,171 | | |
| Assiniboia | Ed Mandrake | | | | 3,918 | | |
| Brandon East | Lois Fjeldsted | | | | 2,260 | | |
| Brandon West | John Worley | | | | 3,618 | | |
| Burrows | William Chornopyski | | | | 3,114 | | |
| Charleswood | Shan Nelson | | | | 5,850 | | |
| Churchill | George Kernaghan | | | | 714 | | |
| Concordia | Barbara Blomeley | Blomeley received 2,948 votes (30.03%), finishing second against New Democratic Party leader Gary Doer. | | | 2,948 | | |
| Dauphin | Peter Rampton | | | | 2,475 | | |
| Ellice | Avis Gray | | | | 3,081 | | |
| Elmwood | Ed Price | | | | 2,839 | | |
| Emerson | Martin Stadler | | | | 2,615 | | |
| Flin Flon | J. Brian King | | | | 867 | | |
| Fort Garry | Laurie Evans | | | | 6,055 | | |
| Fort Rouge | Jim Carr | | | | | | |
| Gimli | Morley Murray | | | | | | |
| Gladstone | Cordell Barker | | | | | | |
| Inkster | Kevin Lamoureux | | | | | | |
| Interlake | Clyde Sigurdson | | | | | | |
| Kildonan | Hy Berman | | | | | | |
| Kirkfield Park | Irene Friesen | | | | | | |
| Lac du Bonnet | Peter Raymond | | | | | | |
| Lakeside | Delmer Nott | | | | | | |
| La Verendrye | Cornelius Goertzen | | | | | | |
| Logan | John Dobbin | | | | | | |
| Minnedosa | Terry Drebit | | | | | | |
| Morris | Barbara Plas | | | | | | |
| Niakwa | Herold Driedger | | | | | | |
| Osborne | Reg Alcock | | | | | | |
| Pembina | Marilyn Skubovius | | | | | | |
| Portage la Prairie | Darlene Hamm | | | | | | |
| Radisson | Allan Patterson | | | | | | |
| Rhineland | Walter Hiebert | | | | | | |
| Riel | Chris Sigurdson | Sigurdson contested Riel as the Liberal candidate in the 1986 Manitoba provincial elections as well as in 1988. In 2010 he was elected as a School trustee in the Louis Riel School Division. He was re-elected in 2014, 2018 and 2022, he served as Board Chair from 2014-2018. He is currently running for City Councillor in the St. Vital Ward in the 2026 Winnipeg municipal election. Sigurdson works as a Criminal Defense Lawyer. | | | | | |
| River East | Morley Golden | | | | | | |
| River Heights | Sharon Carstairs | | | | | | |
| Roblin–Russell | Neil Stewart | | | | | | |
| Rossmere | Cecilia Donnelly | | | | | | |
| Rupertsland | Maurice Berens | | | | | | |
| St. Boniface | Neil Gaudry | | | | | | |
| St. James | Paul Edwards | | | | | | |
| St. Johns | Ruth Oberman | | | | | | |
| St. Norbert | John Angus | | | | | | |
| St. Vital | Bob Rose | | | | | | |
| Ste. Rose | Brent Johnson | | | | | | |
| Selkirk | Gwen Charles | | | | | | |
| Seven Oaks | Mark Minenko | | | | | | |
| Springfield | Lance Laufer | | | | | | |
| Sturgeon Creek | Iva Yeo | | | | | | |
| Swan River | Don Dennis | | | | | | |
| The Pas | Scott Gray | | | | | | |
| Thompson | Janice Pronteau | | | | | | |
| Transcona | Richard Kozak | | | | | | |
| Turtle Mountain | Ross McMillan | | | | | | |
| Tuxedo | Jasper McKee | | | | | | |
| Virden | Bill Davison | | | | | | |
| Wolseley | Harold Taylor | | | | | | |
