= Cliff Cullen =

Canadian politician (born 1962)

10th Deputy Premier of Manitoba
- In office January 18, 2022 – October 18, 2023
- Premier: Heather Stefanson
- Preceded by: Kelvin Goertzen
- Succeeded by: Uzoma Asagwara

Manitoba Minister of Finance
- In office January 30, 2023 – October 18, 2023
- Premier: Heather Stefanson
- Preceded by: Cameron Friesen
- Succeeded by: Adrien Sala

Minister of Economic Development, Investment and Trade
- In office January 18, 2022 – January 30, 2023
- Premier: Heather Stefanson
- Preceded by: Jon Reyes
- Succeeded by: Jeff Wharton

Manitoba Minister of Education
- In office January 5, 2021 – January 18, 2022
- Premier: Brian Pallister; Kelvin Goertzen; Heather Stefanson
- Preceded by: Kelvin Goertzen
- Succeeded by: Wayne Ewasko

Manitoba Minister of Justice and Attorney General
- In office August 1, 2018 – January 5, 2021
- Premier: Brian Pallister
- Preceded by: Heather Stefanson
- Succeeded by: Cameron Friesen

Manitoba Minister of Crown Services
- In office August 17, 2017 – August 1, 2018
- Premier: Brian Pallister
- Preceded by: Ron Schuler
- Succeeded by: Colleen Mayer

Manitoba Minister of Growth, Enterprise and Trade
- In office May 3, 2016 – August 17, 2017
- Premier: Brian Pallister
- Preceded by: portfolio established
- Succeeded by: Blaine Pedersen

Member of the Legislative Assembly of Manitoba for Spruce Woods Turtle Mountain 2004–2011
- In office October 4, 2011 – September 5, 2023
- Preceded by: first member
- Succeeded by: Grant Jackson
- In office July 2, 2004 – October 4, 2011
- Preceded by: Merv Tweed
- Succeeded by: riding dissolved

Personal details
- Born: November 8, 1962 (age 63)
- Party: Progressive Conservative Party
- Education: University of Manitoba

Clifford James Cullen (born November 8, 1962) is a Canadian politician and member of the Legislative Assembly of Manitoba for Spruce Woods. He was first elected in a by-election held in the summer of 2004, and was re-elected in 2007, 2011, 2016, and 2019.

== Early life and education ==
Cullen was raised on a farm near Wawanesa, Manitoba, and subsequently attended the University of Manitoba, where he received a Diploma in Agriculture. He worked in the agricultural and environmental sectors, and also has experience as an insurance broker.

== Political career ==
When Turtle Mountain MLA Mervin Tweed resigned from the provincial legislature in 2004 to run as a candidate in the 2004 Canadian federal election, Cullen sought and won the Progressive Conservative Party of Manitoba nomination to succeed him. Cullen was elected with about 60% of the popular vote on June 29, 2004.

The Turtle Mountain constituency was abolished for the 2011 provincial election, and Cullen sought election in Spruce Woods, which absorbed the western portion of Turtle Mountain. He won easily with 66 percent of the vote.

On May 3, 2016, Cullen was appointed to the Executive Council of Manitoba as Minister of Growth, Enterprise and Trade.

Cullen was named Minister of Crown Services and Government House Leader as part of a cabinet shuffle on August 17, 2017.

On August 1, 2018, Cullen was named Minister of Justice and Attorney General.

On January 5, 2021, Cullen was named Minister of Education.

On January 18, 2022 Cullen was named Deputy Premier of Manitoba and Minister of Economic Development, Investment and trade.

On January 30, 2023 after Cameron Friesen resigned as Finance Minister and MLA, Cullen was named Finance Minister.

== Personal life ==
Cullen makes his home in the Glenboro area with his wife Marilyn and three sons.

== Electoral record ==
2019 Manitoba general election: Spruce Woods
Party	Candidate	Votes	%	±%	Expenditures
Progressive Conservative	Cliff Cullen	5,665	68.06	-3.3	$12,334.55
New Democratic	Justin Shannon	1,321	15.87	+2.3	$1,211.77
Green	Gordon Beddome	820	9.85	+8.2	$0.00
Liberal	Jennifer Harcus	517	6.21	-1.2	$0.00
Total valid votes		8,323	99.46	–	
Rejected		45	0.54		
Turnout		8,368	56.75		
Eligible voters		14,746			
Progressive Conservative hold		Swing		-2.8	
Source(s) Source: Manitoba. Chief Electoral Officer (2019). Statement of Votes for the 42nd Provincial General Election, September 10, 2019 (PDF) (Report). Winnipeg: Elections Manitoba. "Candidate Election Returns". Elections Manitoba. Elections Manitoba.

2016 Manitoba general election: Spruce Woods
Party	Candidate	Votes	%	±%	Expenditures
Progressive Conservative	Cliff Cullen	5,210	73.12	+6.47	$13,262.74
Manitoba	Malcolm McKellar	738	10.36	–	$3,614.69
New Democratic	Amanda Chmelyk	665	9.33	-19.28	$146.90
Liberal	Jaron Hart	512	7.19	+2.46	$5.84
Total valid votes		7,125	98.57	–	
Rejected		103	1.43	+0.89	
Turnout		7,228	51.99	+3.35	
Eligible voters		13,904			
Progressive Conservative hold		Swing		-1.94	
Source(s) Source: Manitoba. Chief Electoral Officer (2016). Statement of Votes for the 41st Provincial General Election, April 19, 2016 (PDF) (Report). Winnipeg: Elections Manitoba. "Election Returns: 41st General Election". Elections Manitoba. 2016.

2011 Manitoba general election: Spruce Woods
Party	Candidate	Votes	%	Expenditures
Progressive Conservative	Cliff Cullen	4,495	66.65	$14,786.56
New Democratic	Cory Szczepanski	1,930	28.62	$5,104.39
Liberal	Trenton Zazalak	319	4.73	$2,227.13
Total valid votes		6,744	99.47	
Rejected		36	0.53	
Turnout		6,780	48.64	
Eligible voters		13,940		
Source(s) Source: Manitoba. Chief Electoral Officer (2011). Statement of Votes for the 40th Provincial General Election, October 4, 2011 (PDF) (Report). Winnipeg: Elections Manitoba. "Election Returns: 40th General Election". Elections Manitoba. 2011.

2007 Manitoba general election: Turtle Mountain
Party	Candidate	Votes	%	±%	Expenditures
Progressive Conservative	Cliff Cullen	4,318	66.10	3.08	$15,425.52
New Democratic	Faron Douglas	1,476	22.59	4.41	$3,785.64
Liberal	Allen Hunter	739	11.31	-7.49	$3,458.77
Total valid votes		6,533	–	–	
Rejected		42	–		
Eligible voters / turnout		12,089	54.39	7.29	
Source(s) Source: Manitoba. Chief Electoral Officer (2007). Statement of Votes for the 39th Provincial General Election, May 22, 2007 (PDF) (Report). Winnipeg: Elections Manitoba.

Manitoba provincial by-election, July 2, 2004: Turtle Mountain Resignation of Merv Tweed
Party	Candidate	Votes	%	±%	Expenditures
Progressive Conservative	Cliff Cullen	3,632	63.01	3.00	$11,273.31
Liberal	Bev Leadbeater	1,084	18.81	7.54	$2,256.63
New Democratic	Betty Storie	1,048	18.18	-10.53	$12,037.72
Total valid votes		5,764	–	–	
Rejected		12	–		
Eligible voters / turnout		12,267	47.10	–	
Source(s) Source:
