= Deputy Premier of Manitoba =

- Incumbent; Uzoma Asagwara since October 18, 2023
- Status: Deputy head of government
- Member of: Cabinet; Legislative Assembly
- Reports to: Premier; Legislative Assembly
- Seat: Winnipeg
- Nominator: Premier
- Appointer: Lieutenant governor
- Term length: At His Majesty's pleasure
- Formation: May 9, 1988
- First holder: Glen Cummings

The deputy premier of Manitoba is a Cabinet minister in the province of Manitoba, Canada. The position has existed for several years, but only appears to have become a full-fledged Cabinet portfolio in 1988. Between 2009 and 2011, the position was held by both Eric Robinson and Rosann Wowchuk; from 2015 to 2016, it was held by both Eric Robinson and Kerri Irvin-Ross. The current deputy premier is Uzoma Asagwara under Premier Wab Kinew.

The minister fulfills the responsibilities of the premier of Manitoba, at times when the premier is absent. The deputy premier is a key part of succession plans for the premier of Manitoba. If the premier dies, the deputy premier replaces them.

== List of deputy premiers of Manitoba ==
No.	Name	Took office	Left office	Political party	Premier	Notes
1	Glen Cummings	May 9, 1988	September 27, 1990	Progressive Conservative	Gary Filmon	
2	James Downey	September 27, 1990	February 5, 1999	Progressive Conservative	Gary Filmon	
3	Jean Friesen	October 5, 1999	June 25, 2003	New Democratic	Gary Doer	
4	Rosann Wowchuk	June 25, 2003	October 3, 2011	New Democratic	Gary Doer	
4	Rosann Wowchuk	June 25, 2003	October 3, 2011	New Democratic	Greg Selinger	Served concurrently with Eric Robinson (2009–2011)
5	Eric Robinson	November 3, 2009	May 3, 2016	New Democratic	Greg Selinger	Served concurrently with Rosan Wowchuk (2009–2011) and Kerri Irvin-Ross (2015–2016)
6	Kerri Irvin-Ross	April 29, 2015	May 3, 2016	New Democratic	Greg Selinger	Served concurrently with Eric Robinson
7	Heather Stefanson	May 3, 2016	January 5, 2021	Progressive Conservative	Brian Pallister	
8	Kelvin Goertzen	January 5, 2021	September 1, 2021	Progressive Conservative	Brian Pallister	
9	Rochelle Squires	September 1, 2021	November 3, 2021	Progressive Conservative	Kelvin Goertzen	
9	Rochelle Squires	September 1, 2021	November 3, 2021	Progressive Conservative	Heather Stefanson	
(8)	Kelvin Goertzen	November 3, 2021	January 18, 2022	Progressive Conservative	Heather Stefanson	
10	Cliff Cullen	January 18, 2022	October 18, 2023	Progressive Conservative	Heather Stefanson	
11	Uzoma Asagwara	October 18, 2023	Incumbent	New Democratic	Wab Kinew	

== See also ==
- Premier (Canada)
- List of Manitoba premiers
- Executive Council of Manitoba
