= Rochelle Squires =

Canadian politician

9th Deputy Premier of Manitoba
- In office September 1, 2021 – November 3, 2021
- Premier: Kelvin Goertzen; Heather Stefanson
- Preceded by: Kelvin Goertzen
- Succeeded by: Kelvin Goertzen

Minister of Families
- In office January 5, 2021 – October 18, 2023
- Premier: Brian Pallister; Kelvin Goertzen; Heather Stefanson
- Preceded by: Heather Stefanson
- Succeeded by: Nahanni Fontaine

Minister of Municipal Relations
- In office October 23, 2019 – January 5, 2021
- Premier: Brian Pallister
- Preceded by: Jeff Wharton
- Succeeded by: Derek Johnson

Minister of Sustainable Development
- In office August 17, 2017 – October 23, 2019
- Premier: Brian Pallister
- Preceded by: Cathy Cox
- Succeeded by: Sarah Guillemard

Minister of Sport, Culture and Heritage
- In office May 3, 2016 – August 17, 2017
- Premier: Brian Pallister
- Preceded by: Ron Lemieux
- Succeeded by: Cathy Cox

Member of the Legislative Assembly of Manitoba for Riel
- In office April 19, 2016 – September 5, 2023
- Preceded by: Christine Melnick
- Succeeded by: Mike Moyes

Personal details
- Party: Progressive Conservative (before 2023)
- Spouse: Daniel
- Education: University of Winnipeg (BA); Red River College University of British Columbia (MFA)

Rochelle Squires is a former Canadian politician who served as the Member of the Legislative Assembly of Manitoba for the riding of Riel from 2016 to 2023.

A member of the Progressive Conservative Party, she was first elected in the 2016 Manitoba election, defeating NDP incumbent Christine Melnick.

== Career ==
Squires was first elected as MLA for Riel after defeating NDP incumbent Christine Melnick in the April 2016 Manitoba election. The Conservatives also replaced the NDP's majority government with one of their own. Squires was described by Steve Lambert of CBC News as "one of the more progressive members of [the Conservative] caucus".

On May 3, 2016, Brian Pallister took office as the Premier of Manitoba. He appointed Squires to the Executive Council of Manitoba as Minister of Sport, Culture and Heritage, Minister responsible for Francophone Affairs, and Minister responsible for Status of Women.

On August 17, 2017, Squires was shuffled out of the Ministry of Sport, Culture and Heritage but retained her other titles.

In September 2019, she and the PC government were re-elected in that year's provincial election. That October, she became Minister of Municipal Relations and continued her role as Minister responsible for Francophone Affairs.

Brian Pallister resigned as premier of Manitoba on September 1, 2021. Subsequently, Premier Kelvin Goertzen selected Squires to serve as Deputy Premier of Manitoba, the position Goertzen himself held before Pallister's resignation.

In the 2023 Manitoba general election, Squires lost her seat to NDP challenger Mike Moyes, who had unsuccessfully challenged her in 2019. The NDP also replaced the PCs as the governing party. She retired from politics and left the PC party the following day.

== Personal life ==
Squires and her husband Daniel have a combined family of five children and two grandsons.

Squires holds a Bachelor of Arts in communications from the University of Winnipeg, a journalism diploma from Red River College, and a Master of Fine Arts in creative writing from the University of British Columbia.

== Electoral record ==
2023 Manitoba general election: Riel
Party	Candidate	Votes	%	±%	Expenditures
New Democratic	Mike Moyes	6,160	54.65	+19.26	$31,115.65
Progressive Conservative	Rochelle Squires	4,278	37.95	-6.80	$37,725.59
Liberal	LéAmber Kensley	834	7.40	-6.51	$2,610.52
Total valid votes/expense limit		11,272	99.23	–	$67,371.00
Total rejected and declined ballots		88	0.77	–	
Turnout		11,360	65.70	+2.46	
Eligible voters		17,291			
New Democratic gain from Progressive Conservative		Swing		+13.03	
Source(s) Source: Elections Manitoba

2019 Manitoba general election: Riel
Party	Candidate	Votes	%	±%	Expenditures
Progressive Conservative	Rochelle Squires	4,734	44.75	-6.2	$40,281.22
New Democratic	Mike Moyes	3,744	35.39	+6.3	$19,468.95
Liberal	Neil Johnston	1,471	13.90	-5.5	$773.76
Green	Roger Schellenberg	630	5.96	+5.3	$5.54
Total valid votes		10,579	99.13		
Total rejected ballots		93	0.87		
Turnout		10,672	63.24		
Eligible voters		16,875			
Progressive Conservative hold		Swing		-6.2	

2016 Manitoba general election: Riel
Party	Candidate	Votes	%	±%	Expenditures
Progressive Conservative	Rochelle Squires	5,024	51.00	+10.98	$31,878.00
New Democratic	Christine Melnick	3,053	30.99	-23.70	$28,196.03
Liberal	Neil Johnston	1,627	16.52	+11.62	$9,674.30
Total valid votes/expense limit		9,704	100.0		$47,429.00
Eligible voters		14,372			
Source: Elections Manitoba

2011 Manitoba general election: Riel
Party	Candidate	Votes	%	±%	Expenditures
New Democratic	Christine Melnick	5,352	54.69	−2.50	$28,596.10
Progressive Conservative	Rochelle Squires	3,916	40.02	+9.33	$28,104.49
Liberal	Cheryl Gilarski	480	4.90	−7.09	$2,997.99
Total valid votes		9,748			
Rejected and declined votes		38			
Turnout		9,786	64.14		
Registered voters		15,257			
Source: Elections Manitoba
