= Kildonan-River East =

Provincial electoral district in Manitoba, Canada

Manitoba electoral district
- Location in Winnipeg

Provincial electoral district
- Legislature: Legislative Assembly of Manitoba
MLA
Rachelle Schott
New Democratic
- District created: 2018
- First contested: 2019
- Last contested: 2023

Demographics
- Population (2016): 21,635
- Electors (2019): 17,661
- Area (km²): 10
- Pop. density (per km²): 2,163.5
- Census division: Division No. 11
- Census subdivision: Winnipeg

Kildonan-River East is a provincial electoral district of Manitoba, Canada, that first came into effect for the 2019 Manitoba general election. It elected one member to the Legislative Assembly of Manitoba.

The riding was created by the 2018 provincial redistribution out of parts of Kildonan, River East, and a small part of St. Johns.

The riding contains the Winnipeg neighbourhoods of Riverbend, Rivergrove, Kildonan Drive, Valhalla, and River East.

== Members of the Legislative Assembly ==
Assembly	Years	Member	Party
Riding created from Kildonan, River East and St. Johns
42nd	2019–2023	Cathy Cox	Progressive Conservative
43rd	2023–present	Rachelle Schott	New Democratic

== Election results ==
=== 2023 ===
2023 Manitoba general election
Party	Candidate	Votes	%	±%	Expenditures
New Democratic	Rachelle Schott	5,574	49.26	+15.23	$50,093.53
Progressive Conservative	Alana Vannahme	4,845	42.82	-8.28	$49,498.94
Liberal	Ian Macintyre	896	7.92	-6.95	$3,960.48
Total valid votes/expense limit		11,315	99.46	–	$70,175.00
Total rejected and declined ballots		62	0.54	–	
Turnout		11,377	63.18	+1.36	
Eligible voters		18,007			
New Democratic gain from Progressive Conservative		Swing		+11.75	
Source(s) Source: Elections Manitoba

=== 2019 ===
2019 Manitoba general election
Party	Candidate	Votes	%	±%	Expenditures
Progressive Conservative	Cathy Cox	5,523	51.10	-6.2	$45,368.19
New Democratic	Elliot Macdonald	3,679	34.04	+3.5	$11,136.64
Liberal	Kathryn Braun	1,607	14.87	+5.5	$1,884.66
Total valid votes		10,809	99.00		
Rejected		109	1.00		
Turnout		10,918	61.82		
Eligible voters		17,661			
Progressive Conservative hold		Swing		-4.9	
Source(s) Source: Manitoba. Chief Electoral Officer (2019). Statement of Votes for the 42nd Provincial General Election, September 10, 2019 (PDF) (Report). Winnipeg: Elections Manitoba. "Candidate Election Returns". Elections Manitoba. Elections Manitoba.

2016 provincial election redistributed results
Party	%
Progressive Conservative	57.3
New Democratic	30.5
Liberal	9.4
Green	1.8
Manitoba	1.1

== See also ==
- List of Manitoba provincial electoral districts
- Canadian provincial electoral districts
