= Minister of Conservation (Manitoba) =

Cabinet position in Manitoba

The Minister of Environment and Climate Change (formerly the Minister of Environment, Climate and Parks, Minister of Sustainable Development, Conservation and Climate and Environment and Climate) is the member of the Executive Council of Manitoba who oversees the Department of Environment and Climate Change, which is responsible for issues related to Manitoba's environment and biodiversity of natural resources (e.g., water, wildlife, and forests).

The current Environment and Climate Change Minister is Mike Moyes and the Deputy Minister is Jocelyn Baker.

== List of ministers ==
No.	Portrait	Name	Term of office		Party	Premier
Minister of Conservation
1		Oscar Lathlin	October 5, 1999	September 25, 2002	New Democratic	Gary Doer
2		Steve Ashton	September 25, 2002	November 4, 2003	New Democratic	
3		Stan Struthers	November 4, 2003	November 3, 2009	New Democratic	
4		Bill Blaikie	November 3, 2009	October 3, 2011	New Democratic	
Minister of Sustainable Development
5		Cathy Cox	May 3, 2016	August 17, 2017	Progressive Conservative	Brian Pallister
6		Rochelle Squires	August 17, 2017	October 23, 2019	Progressive Conservative	Brian Pallister
Minister of Conservation and Climate
7		Sarah Guillemard	October 23, 2019	January 18, 2022	Progressive Conservative	Brian Pallister
Minister of Environment, Climate and Parks
8		Jeff Wharton	January 18, 2022	January 30, 2023	Progressive Conservative	Heather Stefanson
Minister of Environment and Climate
9		Kevin Klein	January 30, 2023	October 18, 2023	Progressive Conservative	Heather Stefanson
Minister of Environment and Climate Change
10		Tracy Schmidt	October 18, 2023	January 23, 2025	New Democratic	Wab Kinew
11		Mike Moyes	January 23, 2025	Incumbent	New Democratic	Wab Kinew

== Acts and regulations ==
Current acts and regulations under the Continuing Consolidation of the Statutes of Manitoba (CCSM) for which the Minister of Conservation and Climate is responsible for include:

- Biofuels Act, SM 2003, c. 5
- Conservation Agreements Act, SM 1997, c. 59
- Conservation Officers Act, SM 2015, c. 4
- Contaminated Sites Remediation Act, SM 1996, c. 40
- Crown Corporations Governance and Accountability Act, SM 2017, c. 19 [only as it relates to Efficiency Manitoba]
- Dangerous Goods Handling and Transportation Act, RSM 1987, c. D12
- Drinking Water Safety Act, SM 2002, c. 36
- East Side Traditional Lands Planning and Special Protected Areas Act, SM 2009, c. 7
- Ecological Reserves Act, RSM 1987, c. E5
- Efficiency Manitoba Act, SM 2017, c. 18
- Energy Act, SM 1994, c. 3
- Environment Act, SM 1987-88, c. 26
- Gas Pipe Line Act, RSM 1987, c. G50
- Groundwater and Water Well Act, SM 2012, c. 27
- Ozone Depleting Substances Act, SM 1989-90, c. 38
- Provincial Parks Act, SM 1993, c. 39
- Polar Bear Protection Act, SM 2002, c. 25
- Resource Tourism Operators Act, SM 2002, c. 46
- Waste Reduction and Prevention Act, SM 1989-90, c. 60
- Water Power Act, RSM 1987, c. W60
- Water Protection Act, SM 2005, c. 26
- Water Resources Conservation Act, SM 2000, c. 11
- Water Rights Act, RSM 1988, c. W80
- Wildfires Act, SM 1997, c. 36
