= Sarah Guillemard =

Canadian politician

Minister of Advanced Education and Training
- In office January 30, 2023 – October 18, 2023
- Premier: Heather Stefanson
- Preceded by: Jon Reyes
- Succeeded by: Renée Cable

Minister of Mental Health and Community Wellness
- In office January 18, 2022 – January 30, 2023
- Premier: Heather Stefanson
- Preceded by: Audrey Gordon
- Succeeded by: Janice Morley-Lecomte

Minister of Conservation and Climate
- In office October 23, 2019 – January 18, 2022
- Premier: Brian Pallister; Kelvin Goertzen; Heather Stefanson
- Preceded by: Rochelle Squires
- Succeeded by: Jeff Wharton

Member of the Legislative Assembly of Manitoba for Fort Richmond
- In office April 19, 2016 – October 3, 2023
- Preceded by: Kerri Irvin-Ross
- Succeeded by: Jennifer Chen

Personal details
- Party: Progressive Conservative

Sarah Guillemard is a Canadian provincial politician, who was elected as the Member of the Legislative Assembly of Manitoba for the riding of Fort Richmond in the 2016 election. She is a member of the Progressive Conservative Party of Manitoba, she served as the minister of Advanced Education and Training, minister of Mental Health and Community Wellness and Minister of Environment and Climate. She defeated NDP incumbent Kerri Irvin-Ross in the election. She was re-elected in the 2019 provincial election. In the 2023 provincial election, Guillemard did not seek reelection and her seat was won by NDP candidate Jennifer Chen.

After leaving office, Guillemard said that she was sexually assaulted by a former MLA and that she faced consequences from the Manitoba PC Party after coming forward.
