= Department of Families (Manitoba) =

- Ministère des Familles

Agency overview
- Jurisdiction: Government of Manitoba
- Minister responsible: Nahanni Fontaine, Minister of Families Minister responsible for Gender Equity
- Deputy Minister responsible: Kathryn Gerrard, Deputy Minister of Families (2020)
- Website: www.gov.mb.ca/fs/index.html

The Department of Families (French: Ministère des Familles; also known as Manitoba Families) is the Manitoba Government agency responsible for family-related programs and services in the province of Manitoba.

The department was created on 3 May 2016 by the newly elected government of Brian Pallister, combining the responsibilities of the former Departments of Family Services and of Housing and Community Development into a single unit.

In 2021, Rochelle Squires became the Minister of Families (French: Ministre des Familles), replacing Minister Heather Stefanson. The department also includes the Minister responsible for the Status of Women.

== Department history ==
The two-year process of preparing a new Child Welfare Act for Manitoba begun in 1922, partly in response to the Manitoba Social Service Council's call to the provincial government:

that the Government of Manitoba take early steps to establish and adequately support a Child Welfare Department for the province, shaped on modern lines and provided with facilities which will make possible proper classification of the children cared for, efficient supervision of them all, and a comprehensive survey of the needs of the province in this most important of all fields.

— D. B. Harkness (March, 1920), "General Report of the Executive of the Social Service Council of Manitoba," Social Welfare Journal 2

The Government created the new Department of Public Welfare in 1924 and added it to the existing responsibilities of the Minister of Education. Between 1928 and 1961, it was known as the Department of Health and Public Welfare, followed by the Department of Welfare in 1961. In 1990, it was renamed to the Department of Family Services, and in 1999, the Department of Family Services and Housing. In 2009, the name was changed to Family Services and Consumer Affairs. In 2012, the department became Family Services and Labour. In 2013, the department returned to the name Family Services.

In 2016, the department name was changed to the Department of Families.

== Minister of Families ==
Minister of Families
- Ministre des Familles
- Incumbent; Nahanni Fontaine since October 18, 2023: Gender Equity Manitoba Secretariat
- Department of Families
- Member of: Executive Council of Manitoba

The Department of Families in Manitoba is overseen by the Minister of Families (French: Ministre des Familles), which was assigned to Nahanni Fontaine in 2023, replacing former Minister Rochelle Squires.

In 1990, the Minister of Family Services is a cabinet position in the Government of Manitoba. In 1999, the responsibilities of this portfolio were assigned to the new Minister of Family Services and Housing.

The position of the Minister of Family Services and Housing was created in 1999, incorporating the responsibilities of the former Minister of Family Services and Minister of Housing. In 2009, the responsibilities of the portfolio were split into Family Services and Consumer Affairs and Housing and Community Development following the announcement of Premier Greg Selinger's new cabinet in 2009.

The Minister of Family Services and Consumer Affairs, which was created in 2009, would have its portfolio's functions redistributed in 2012 between the Minister of Family Services and Labour and the Minister of Healthy Living, Seniors and Consumer Affairs.

In 2013, the Minister of Family Services position was reinstated; however, in 2016, the responsibilities of this portfolio would be assigned to the new Minister of Families.

List of Ministers
Name	Party	Took office	Left office
Minister of Family Services
Harold Gilleshammer	Progressive Conservative	September 11, 1990	September 10, 1993
Bonnie Mitchelson	Progressive Conservative	September 10, 1993	October 5, 1999
Minister of Family Services and Housing
Tim Sale	New Democratic Party	October 5, 1999	September 25, 2002
Drew Caldwell	New Democratic Party	September 25, 2002	November 4, 2003
Christine Melnick	New Democratic Party	November 4, 2003	September 21, 2006
Gord Mackintosh	New Democratic Party	September 21, 2006	November 3, 2009
Minister of Family Services and Consumer Affairs
Gord Mackintosh	New Democratic Party	November 3, 2009	January 13, 2012
Minister of Family Services
Kerri Irvin-Ross	New Democratic Party	October 18, 2013	May 3, 2016
Minister of Families
Scott Fielding	Progressive Conservative	May 3, 2016	August 1, 2018
Heather Stefanson	Progressive Conservative	August 1, 2018	January 5, 2021
Rochelle Squires	Progressive Conservative	January 5, 2021	October 18, 2023
Nahanni Fontaine	New Democratic Party	October 18, 2023	

== Related legislation ==
=== Family Services ===
Acts	Note
The Accessibility for Manitobans Act	
The Adoption Act	
The Adult Abuse Registry Act	
The Child and Family Services Act	
The Child and Family Services Authorities Act	
The Community Child Care Standards Act	
The Intercountry Adoption (Hague Convention) Act	
The Manitoba Women’s Advisory Council Act	
The Parents' Maintenance Act [Section 10]	
The Poverty Reduction Strategy Act	
The Social Services Administration Act	Under this Act, responsibility for "The Residential Care Facilities Licensing Regulation," M.R. 484/88 R and the whole Act except as it relates to employment and income supports
The Social Services Appeal Board Act	
The Social Work Profession Act	
The Vulnerable Persons Living with a Mental Disability Act	

=== Housing and Community Development ===
Acts	Note
The Community Renewal Act	
The Co-operative Associations Loans and Loans Guarantee Act	
The Cooperative Housing Strategy Act	
The Cooperative Promotion Trust Act	
The Elderly and Infirm Persons’ Housing Act	with respect to elderly persons’ housing units as defined in the Act
The Housing and Renewal Corporation Act	except Clause 44(k) and The RentAid Regulation (MR. 148/2006)
The Income Tax Act, sections 7.13 to 7.16 and 10.6	

== See also ==
- List of Manitoba government departments and agencies
