= Cathy Cox (Canadian politician) =

Canadian provincial politician

Minister of Sport, Culture and Heritage
- In office August 17, 2017 – January 18, 2022
- Premier: Brian Pallister; Kelvin Goertzen; Heather Stefanson
- Preceded by: Rochelle Squires
- Succeeded by: Andrew Smith

Minister of Sustainable Development
- In office May 3, 2016 – August 17, 2017
- Premier: Brian Pallister
- Preceded by: Tom Nevakshonoff
- Succeeded by: Rochelle Squires

Member of the Legislative Assembly of Manitoba for Kildonan-River East
- In office September 10, 2019 – September 5, 2023
- Preceded by: first member
- Succeeded by: Rachelle Schott

Member of the Legislative Assembly of Manitoba for River East
- In office April 19, 2016 – September 10, 2019
- Preceded by: Bonnie Mitchelson
- Succeeded by: riding dissolved

Personal details
- Party: Progressive Conservative

Cathy Cox is a Canadian provincial politician, who was elected as the Member of the Legislative Assembly of Manitoba for the riding of River East in the 2016 election. She is a member of the Progressive Conservative Party of Manitoba (PCs). She held the riding for the party after incumbent MLA Bonnie Mitchelson did not stand for re-election.

On 3 May 2016, when the PC government was officially sworn in, Cox was appointed to the Executive Council of Manitoba as Minister of Sustainable Development.

On 17 August 2017, Cox was named Minister of Sport, Culture and Heritage.

She was re-elected for Kildonan-River East in the 2019 provincial election, the first after the decennial electoral redistribution that occurred the previous year.
