= Rachelle Schott =

Canadian politician

Rachelle Schott MLA

Member of the Legislative Assembly of Manitoba for Kildonan-River East
- Incumbent
- Assumed office October 3, 2023
- Preceded by: Cathy Cox

Personal details
- Party: New Democratic
- Children: 2
- Education: Southern Alberta Institute of Technology University of Manitoba (BA)

Rachelle Rebecca Schott is a Canadian politician, who was elected to the Legislative Assembly of Manitoba in the 2023 Manitoba general election. She represents the district of Kildonan-River East as a member of the Manitoba New Democratic Party.

Schott grew up in North Kildonan and lives in the Fraser's Grove neighbourhood. Her uncle is former premier Gary Doer.

== Electoral history ==
2023 Manitoba general election: Kildonan-River East
Party	Candidate	Votes	%	±%	Expenditures
New Democratic	Rachelle Schott	5,574	49.26	+15.23	$50,093.53
Progressive Conservative	Alana Vannahme	4,845	42.82	-8.28	$49,498.94
Liberal	Ian Macintyre	896	7.92	-6.95	$3,960.48
Total valid votes/expense limit		11,315	99.46	–	$70,175.00
Total rejected and declined ballots		62	0.54	–	
Turnout		11,377	63.18	+1.36	
Eligible voters		18,007			
New Democratic gain from Progressive Conservative		Swing		+11.75	
Source(s) Source: Elections Manitoba
