= Riel (electoral district) =

Provincial electoral district in Manitoba, Canada

Coordinates: 49.827°N 97.123°W

Manitoba electoral district
- Location in Winnipeg

Provincial electoral district
- Legislature: Legislative Assembly of Manitoba
MLA
Mike Moyes
New Democratic
- First contested: 1969
- Last contested: 2023

Riel is a provincial electoral district of Manitoba, Canada. It was created by redistribution in 1968, and has formally existed since the provincial election of 1969. The riding is in the south-central region of Winnipeg, Manitoba's capital and largest city, and is named after Louis Riel, the leader of the 1870 Red River Rebellion.

Riel is bordered to the south by Seine River, to the east across the Seine River by Lagimodière, to the north by St. Vital, to the northwest by Fort Garry, and to the southwest by Fort Richmond, the latter two across the Red River of the North.

The riding's population in 1996 was 20,228. The riding's character is mostly middle- and upper middle-class. In 1999, the average family income was $63,126, and the unemployment rate was 5.50%. Nine percent of the riding's residents are francophone.

The service industry accounts for 15% of Riel's economy, followed by health and social services at 12.5%.

A Progressive Conservative–New Democrat swing seat, Riel is often considered one of the bellwether constituencies in Manitoba. It has elected a Member of the Legislative Assembly from the party that has won every general election since 1988; the NDP and PCs have supplied all its MLAs since it was established while the Liberals last came second here in 1995. The current MLA is Mike Moyes of the NDP. The previous MLA was Rochelle Squires of the PCs.

== Members of the Legislative Assembly ==
Name	Party	Took office	Left office
Donald Craik	PC	1969	1981
Doreen Dodick	NDP	1981	1986
Gerry Ducharme	PC	1986	1995
David Newman	PC	1995	1999
Linda Asper	NDP	1999	2003
Christine Melnick	NDP	2003	2016
Rochelle Squires	PC	2016	2023
Mike Moyes	NDP	2023	present

== Electoral results ==
2023 Manitoba general election
Party	Candidate	Votes	%	±%	Expenditures
New Democratic	Mike Moyes	6,160	54.65	+19.26	$31,115.65
Progressive Conservative	Rochelle Squires	4,278	37.95	-6.80	$37,725.59
Liberal	LéAmber Kensley	834	7.40	-6.51	$2,610.52
Total valid votes/expense limit		11,272	99.23	–	$67,371.00
Total rejected and declined ballots		88	0.77	–	
Turnout		11,360	65.70	+2.46	
Eligible voters		17,291			
New Democratic gain from Progressive Conservative		Swing		+13.03	
Source(s) Source: Elections Manitoba

2019 Manitoba general election
Party	Candidate	Votes	%	±%	Expenditures
Progressive Conservative	Rochelle Squires	4,734	44.75	-6.2	$40,281.22
New Democratic	Mike Moyes	3,744	35.39	+6.3	$19,468.95
Liberal	Neil Johnston	1,471	13.90	-5.5	$773.76
Green	Roger Schellenberg	630	5.96	+5.3	$5.54
Total valid votes		10,579	99.13		
Total rejected ballots		93	0.87		
Turnout		10,672	63.24		
Eligible voters		16,875			
Progressive Conservative hold		Swing		-6.2	

2016 provincial election redistributed results
Party	%
Progressive Conservative	50.9
New Democratic	29.1
Liberal	19.4
Green	0.7

2016 Manitoba general election
Party	Candidate	Votes	%	±%	Expenditures
Progressive Conservative	Rochelle Squires	5,024	51.00	+10.98	$31,878.00
New Democratic	Christine Melnick	3,053	30.99	-23.70	$28,196.03
Liberal	Neil Johnston	1,627	16.52	+11.62	$9,674.30
Total valid votes/expense limit		9,704	100.0		$47,429.00
Eligible voters		14,372			
Source: Elections Manitoba

2011 Manitoba general election
Party	Candidate	Votes	%	±%	Expenditures
New Democratic	Christine Melnick	5,352	54.69	−2.50	$28,596.10
Progressive Conservative	Rochelle Squires	3,916	40.02	+9.33	$28,104.49
Liberal	Cheryl Gilarski	480	4.90	−7.09	$2,997.99
Total valid votes		9,748			
Rejected and declined votes		38			
Turnout		9,786	64.14		
Registered voters		15,257			
Source: Elections Manitoba

2007 Manitoba general election
Party	Candidate	Votes	%	±%	Expenditures
New Democratic	Christine Melnick	4,883	57.19	+3.16	$23,004.50
Progressive Conservative	Trudy Turner	2,620	30.69	-7.14	$34,539.37
Liberal	Grant Woods	1024	11.99	+3.85	$12,309.36
Total valid votes		8,538	100.00		
Rejected and declined votes		51			
Turnout		8,589	63.03		
Registered voters		13,626			
Source: Elections Manitoba

2003 Manitoba general election
Party	Candidate	Votes	%	±%	Expenditures
New Democratic	Christine Melnick	4,455	54.03	+7.35	$21,486.24
Progressive Conservative	Shirley Render	3,119	37.83	-6.20	$20,036.18
Liberal	Kristopher Ade	671	8.14	+0.22	$8,594.68

1999 Manitoba general election
Party	Candidate	Votes	%	±%	Expenditures
New Democratic	Linda Asper	4,883	46.68		$20,612.00
Progressive Conservative	David Newman	4,559	44.03		$27,412.91
Liberal	Clayton Weselowski	820	7.92	–	$3,179.52
Manitoba	Mike Kubara	91	0.88		$3,179.52
Total valid votes		10,303	99.35		
Rejected and declined votes		51	0.65		
Turnout		10,354	76.08		
Registered voters		13,610			
Source: Elections Manitoba

1988 Manitoba general election
Party	Candidate	Votes	%	±%
Progressive Conservative	Gerry Ducharme	4,289	41.71	-5.39
Liberal	Chris Sigurdson	3,965	38.56	+26.64
New Democratic	Bob Ages	1,834	17.83	-21.19
Confederation of Regions	John Hiebert	121	1.18	-0.79
Western Independence	Neil Knight	75	0.73	n/a
Turnout		10,308	77.88	
Registered voters		13,235		
Progressive Conservative hold		Swing		-16.02
Source: Elections Manitoba

== Previous boundaries ==
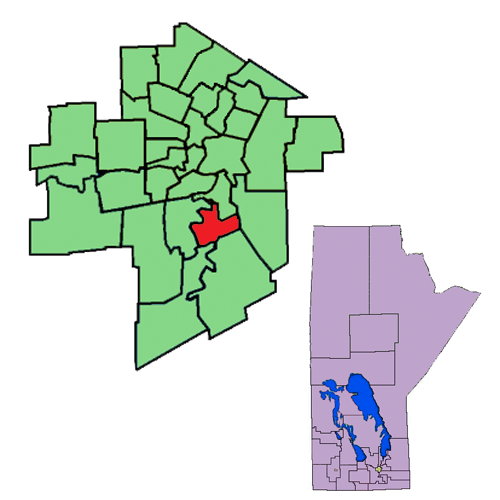
The 1999–2011 boundaries for Riel highlighted in red.

== See also ==
- List of Manitoba provincial electoral districts
- Canadian provincial electoral districts
