= Fort Richmond =

Provincial electoral district in Manitoba, Canada

Coordinates: 49°48′21″N 97°08′20″W

Manitoba electoral district
- Location in Winnipeg

Provincial electoral district
- Legislature: Legislative Assembly of Manitoba
MLA
Jennifer Chen
New Democratic
- District created: 2008
- First contested: 2011
- Last contested: 2023

Fort Richmond is a provincial electoral district in the southern suburban part of Winnipeg in the Canadian province of Manitoba. It was formed by redistribution in 2008 out of parts of the electoral divisions of St. Norbert and Fort Garry.

As of the electoral redistribution in 2018, which took effect the following year, it is bordered by the ridings of Fort Garry on the north, Riel on the east, Seine River on the south, and Waverley on the west. The riding's population in 2006 was 20,750. Located in the riding is the University of Manitoba, the largest post-secondary school in the province.

== Members of the Legislative Assembly ==
Assembly	Years	Member	Party
Riding created from St. Norbert and Fort Garry
40th	2011-2016	Kerri Irvin-Ross	New Democratic
41st	2016-2019	Sarah Guillemard	Progressive Conservative
42nd	2019-2023	Sarah Guillemard	Progressive Conservative
43rd	2023–present	Jennifer Chen	New Democratic

== Election results ==
=== 2023 ===
2023 Manitoba general election
Party	Candidate	Votes	%	±%	Expenditures
New Democratic	Jennifer Chen	4,455	54.46	+32.26	$29,564.11
Progressive Conservative	Paramjit Shahi	2,879	35.19	−6.96	$30,559.74
Liberal	Ernie Nathaniel	848	10.36	−20.36	$9,216.43
Total valid votes/expense limit		8,182	99.44	–	$53,129.00
Total rejected and declined ballots		46	0.56	–	
Turnout		8,228	62.07	+4.68	
Eligible voters		13,257			
New Democratic gain from Progressive Conservative		Swing		+19.61	
Source(s) Source: Elections Manitoba

=== 2019 ===
2019 Manitoba general election
Party	Candidate	Votes	%	±%	Expenditures
Progressive Conservative	Sarah Guillemard	3,242	42.15	-5.6	$36,471.14
Liberal	Tanjit Nagra	2,363	30.72	+18.0	$20,963.64
New Democratic	George Wong	1,708	22.20	-11.9	$4,895.67
Green	Cameron Proulx	379	4.93	+0.3	$0.00
Total valid votes		7,692	99.48	–	
Rejected		40	0.52		
Turnout		7,732	57.38		
Eligible voters		13,474			
Progressive Conservative hold		Swing		-11.8	
Source(s) Source: Manitoba. Chief Electoral Officer (2019). Statement of Votes for the 42nd Provincial General Election, September 10, 2019 (PDF) (Report). Winnipeg: Elections Manitoba. "Candidate Election Returns". Elections Manitoba. Elections Manitoba.

=== 2016 ===
2016 provincial election redistributed results
Party	%
Progressive Conservative	47.7
New Democratic	34.1
Liberal	12.7
Green	4.6
Independent	0.9

2016 Manitoba general election
Party	Candidate	Votes	%	±%	Expenditures
Progressive Conservative	Sarah Guillemard	2,879	44.24	5.62	$36,348.09
New Democratic	Kerri Irvin-Ross	2,274	34.95	-18.53	$24,467.21
Liberal	Kyra Wilson	814	12.51	7.61	$5,227.22
Green	Cameron Proulx	540	8.30	5.30	$0.00
Total valid votes / expense limit		6,507	–	–	$37,429.00
Rejected		75	–		
Eligible voters / turnout		9,809	67.10	4.19	
Source(s) Source: Manitoba. Chief Electoral Officer (2016). Statement of Votes for the 41st Provincial General Election, April 19, 2016 (PDF) (Report). Winnipeg: Elections Manitoba. "Election Returns: 41st General Election". Elections Manitoba. 2016.

=== 2011 ===
2011 Manitoba general election
Party	Candidate	Votes	%	Expenditures
New Democratic	Kerri Irvin-Ross	4,026	53.47	$16,634.85
Progressive Conservative	Shaun McCaffrey	2,908	38.62	$24,661.31
Liberal	Dustin Hiles	369	4.90	$2,497.98
Green	Caitlin McIntyre	226	3.00	$65.08
Total valid votes		7,529	–	
Rejected		45	–	
Eligible voters / turnout		12,040	62.91	
Source(s) Source: Manitoba. Chief Electoral Officer (2011). Statement of Votes for the 40th Provincial General Election, October 4, 2011 (PDF) (Report). Winnipeg: Elections Manitoba. "Election Returns: 40th General Election". Elections Manitoba. 2011.

== See also ==
- List of Manitoba provincial electoral districts
- Canadian provincial electoral districts
