= Bonnie Mitchelson =

Canadian politician

Leader of the Opposition in Manitoba
- In office May 29, 2000 – November 4, 2000
- Preceded by: Gary Filmon
- Succeeded by: Stuart Murray

Interim Leader of the Progressive Conservative Party of Manitoba
- In office May 29, 2000 – November 4, 2000
- Preceded by: Gary Filmon
- Succeeded by: Stuart Murray

Minister of Culture, Heritage and Recreation
- In office May 9, 1988 – February 5, 1991
- Preceded by: Judy Wasylycia-Leis
- Succeeded by: portfolio renamed

Member of the Legislative Assembly of Manitoba for River East
- In office March 18, 1986 – April 19, 2016
- Preceded by: Phil Eyler
- Succeeded by: Cathy Cox

Personal details
- Born: Bonnie Bester; November 28, 1947 (age 78) Winnipeg, Manitoba
- Party: Progressive Conservative
- Spouse: Don Mitchelson

Bonnie Mitchelson (born November 28, 1947) is a politician in Manitoba, Canada. She was a Progressive Conservative member of the Manitoba legislature from 1986 to 2014, and served as a cabinet minister in the government of Gary Filmon from 1988 to 1999. She also served as interim leader of the Progressive Conservative Party in 2000, following Filmon's resignation.

== Early life and history ==
Born Bonnie Bester, the daughter of Henry Bester and Millie Leslie, she was educated at the Health Sciences Centre School of Nursing and practiced as a Registered Nurse. In 1969, she married Don Mitchelson, who has been a politician, having served as a city councillor in Winnipeg.

== Political career ==
She was first elected to the Manitoba legislature in 1986, defeating incumbent New Democrat Phil Eyler in the northeast Winnipeg riding of River East. She was re-elected by a wider margin in 1988, as Filmon's Tories won a minority government.

On May 9, 1988, Mitchelson was appointed Minister of Culture, Heritage and Recreation (later renamed Culture, Heritage and Citizenship), with responsibility for the Manitoba Lotteries Foundation Act. On February 5, 1991, she was also named Minister responsible for Multiculturalism with responsibility for Status of Women. As Minister of Culture, Mitchelson made the controversial decision to establish a review commission for Manitoba's arts policy that was made up entirely of non-artists.

After a cabinet shuffle on September 10, 1993, she was named Minister of Family Services, and retained the position until the Filmon government was defeated in 1999. Prior to the election of 1999, she proposed a series of workfare measures as part of a policy of welfare reform.

Mitchelson was re-elected by a comfortable margin in 1990, and again in 1995 and 1999. She was chosen as interim leader of the Progressive Conservative Party on May 29, 2000, and held the position until Stuart Murray was acclaimed as party leader in November. She was then named as the party's Deputy Leader. She was the first woman chosen to lead the Manitoba Progressive Conservative party, and only the third female party leader in Manitoba's history.

In the general election of 2003, Mitchelson defeated New Democrat Doug Longstaffe, 4,935 votes to 4,402. She was the only Progressive Conservative MLA to hold a seat in the north of Winnipeg.

She was a supporter of Hugh McFadyen's campaign to succeed Stuart Murray as leader of the Progressive Conservative Party, and was narrowly re-elected in the 2007 provincial election.

== Retirement ==
Bonnie Mitchelson announced her retirement from provincial politics in October 2014.

She served as board Chair of Manitoba Liquor and Lotteries from April 24, 2017 to December 6, 2023.

== Electoral results ==
1999 Manitoba general election: River East
Party	Candidate	Votes	%	±%	Expenditures
Progressive Conservative	Bonnie Mitchelson	5,366	49.99		$29,856.57
New Democratic	Ross Eadie	4,624	43.07		$15,953.00
Liberal	Patrick Saydak	688	6.86	–	$1,187.72
Total valid votes		10,678	100.00		
Rejected and declined ballots		57			
Turnout		10,735	77.30		
Electors on the lists		13,877			
Progressive Conservative hold		Swing		-	

2003 Manitoba general election: River East
Party	Candidate	Votes	%	±%	Expenditures
Progressive Conservative	Bonnie Mitchelson	4,935	51.28	+1.29	$28,259.55
New Democratic	Doug Longstaffe	4,402	45.74	+2.67	$19,179.77
Liberal	Fred Curry	286	2.97	−3.89	$239.00
Total valid votes		9,623	100.00		
Rejected and declined ballots		35			
Turnout		9,658	68.01		
Electors on the lists		14,201			
Progressive Conservative hold		Swing		-	

2007 Manitoba general election: River East
Party	Candidate	Votes	%	±%	Expenditures
Progressive Conservative	Bonnie Mitchelson	4,361	46.63	−4.65	$29,722.71
New Democratic	Kurt Penner	4,309	46.07	−0.33	$24,605.30
Liberal	Margaret von Lau	639	6.80	+3.83	$8,485.65
Total valid votes		9,309	99.54		
Rejected and declined ballots		43			
Turnout		9,352	67.60	−0.41	
Electors on the lists		13,835			
Progressive Conservative hold		Swing		-	

2011 Manitoba general election: River East
Party	Candidate	Votes	%	±%	Expenditures
Progressive Conservative	Bonnie Mitchelson	5,247	51.08	+4.45	$34,898.69
New Democratic	Kurt Penner	4,512	43.92	−2.15	$29,899.44
Green	Kelly Mitchell	274	2.67	–	$0.00
Liberal	Chris Pelda	188	1.83	−4.97	$376.14
Total valid votes		10,221			
Rejected and declined ballots		52			
Turnout		10,273	67.00		
Electors on the lists		15,332			
Progressive Conservative hold		Swing		-	
Source: Elections Manitoba
