= River East =

Defunct provincial electoral district in Manitoba, Canada

Coordinates: 49.944°N 97.049°W

Manitoba electoral district
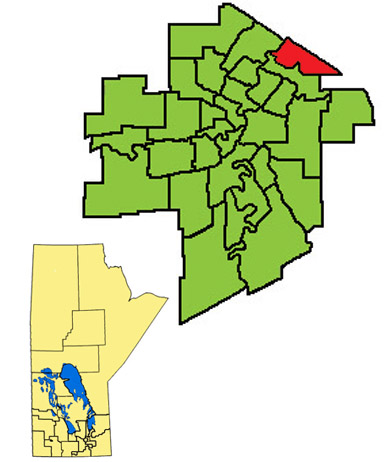

Defunct provincial electoral district
- Legislature: Legislative Assembly of Manitoba
- District created: 1979
- First contested: 1981
- Last contested: 2016

River East was a provincial electoral district of Manitoba, Canada. It was officially created by redistribution in 1979, and formally existed since the provincial election of 1981 until 2019.

The riding was located on the northeast corner of the city of Winnipeg, bordered by the Red River to the west, the city limit, by Springfield, to the north and east, and by the riding of Rossmere to the south.

It was replaced for the 2019 election by the new Kildonan-River East district.

River East was an affluent district with an average income of $62,534 and an unemployment rate of 5.60% in 1999. It also had a large immigrant population, at 17% of the total population. Twelve per cent of River East's residents listed German as their ethnic origin, while a further 9% listed Ukrainian. The riding's total population in 1996 was 19,840.

== History ==
River East was the only riding in the northern part of Winnipeg to be represented by a Progressive Conservative up until the 2016 general election. Bonnie Mitchelson was the Member of the Legislative Assembly for the area from 1986 to 2016, and was re-elected five times. Bonnie Mitchelson announced her retirement in October, 2014, and did not seek re-election in the 2016 general election. The seat was won by Cathy Cox, who held it for the Progressive Conservatives while defeating NDP challenger Jody Gillis. Once considered safe for the Progressive Conservatives, the seat became extremely marginal, with Mitchelson being re-elected in the 2007 provincial election by only 52 votes over the New Democrat candidate. Since then, the PC majorities have increased in 2011 and 2016.

== Members of the Legislative Assembly ==
Name	Party	Took office	Left office
Phil Eyler	NDP	1981	1986
Bonnie Mitchelson	PC	1986	2016
Cathy Cox	PC	2016	2023

== Electoral results ==
=== 2016 ===
2016 Manitoba general election
Party	Candidate	Votes	%	±%	Expenditures
Progressive Conservative	Cathy Cox	6,154	65.71	+14.63	$24,565.22
New Democratic	Jody Gillis	2,435	26	-17.92	$13,778.08
Liberal	Piero Scaramuzzi	776	8.29	+6.46	$1,807.54
Total valid votes/expense limit		9365	100.0		
Total rejected ballots		64			
Total declined ballots		146			
Turnout		9575	65.94	–	
Registered voters		14521			
Source: Elections Manitoba

=== 2011 ===
2011 Manitoba general election
Party	Candidate	Votes	%	±%	Expenditures
Progressive Conservative	Bonnie Mitchelson	5,247	51.08	+4.45	$34,898.69
New Democratic	Kurt Penner	4,512	43.92	−2.15	$29,899.44
Green	Kelly Mitchell	274	2.67	–	$0.00
Liberal	Chris Pelda	188	1.83	−4.97	$376.14
Total valid votes		10,221			
Rejected and declined ballots		52			
Turnout		10,273	67.00		
Electors on the lists		15,332			
Progressive Conservative hold		Swing		-	
Source: Elections Manitoba

=== 2007 ===
2007 Manitoba general election
Party	Candidate	Votes	%	±%	Expenditures
Progressive Conservative	Bonnie Mitchelson	4,361	46.63	−4.65	$29,722.71
New Democratic	Kurt Penner	4,309	46.07	−0.33	$24,605.30
Liberal	Margaret von Lau	639	6.80	+3.83	$8,485.65
Total valid votes		9,309	99.54		
Rejected and declined ballots		43			
Turnout		9,352	67.60	−0.41	
Electors on the lists		13,835			
Progressive Conservative hold		Swing		-	

=== 2003 ===
2003 Manitoba general election
Party	Candidate	Votes	%	±%	Expenditures
Progressive Conservative	Bonnie Mitchelson	4,935	51.28	+1.29	$28,259.55
New Democratic	Doug Longstaffe	4,402	45.74	+2.67	$19,179.77
Liberal	Fred Curry	286	2.97	−3.89	$239.00
Total valid votes		9,623	100.00		
Rejected and declined ballots		35			
Turnout		9,658	68.01		
Electors on the lists		14,201			
Progressive Conservative hold		Swing		-	

=== 1999 ===
1999 Manitoba general election
Party	Candidate	Votes	%	±%	Expenditures
Progressive Conservative	Bonnie Mitchelson	5,366	49.99		$29,856.57
New Democratic	Ross Eadie	4,624	43.07		$15,953.00
Liberal	Patrick Saydak	688	6.86	–	$1,187.72
Total valid votes		10,678	100.00		
Rejected and declined ballots		57			
Turnout		10,735	77.30		
Electors on the lists		13,877			
Progressive Conservative hold		Swing		-	

== Previous boundaries ==
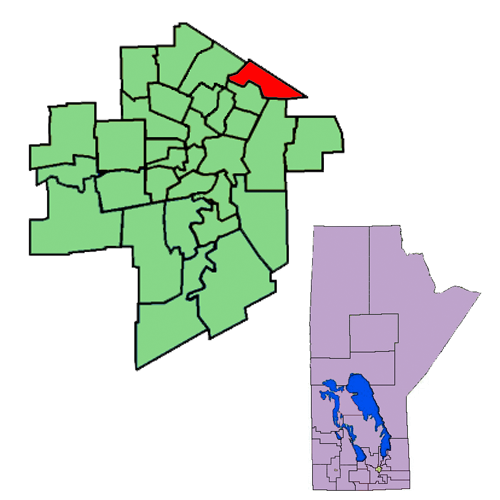
The 1999–2011 boundaries for River East highlighted in red

== See also ==
- List of Manitoba provincial electoral districts
- Canadian provincial electoral districts
