= Jeff Wharton =

Canadian politician

Jeff Wharton MLA

Minister of Economic Development, Investment and Trade
- In office January 30, 2023 – October 18, 2023
- Premier: Heather Stefanson
- Preceded by: Cliff Cullen
- Succeeded by: Jamie Moses

Minister of Environment, Climate and Parks
- In office January 18, 2022 – January 30, 2023
- Premier: Heather Stefanson
- Preceded by: Sarah Guillemard
- Succeeded by: Kevin Klein

Minister of Crown Services
- In office September 25, 2019 – January 18, 2022
- Premier: Brian Pallister; Kelvin Goertzen; Heather Stefanson
- Preceded by: Colleen Mayer
- Succeeded by: Portfolio Abolished

Minister of Municipal Relations
- In office August 17, 2017 – October 23, 2019
- Premier: Brian Pallister
- Preceded by: new portfolio
- Succeeded by: Rochelle Squires

Member of the Legislative Assembly of Manitoba for Red River North Gimli (2016-2019)
- Incumbent
- Assumed office April 19, 2016
- Preceded by: Peter Bjornson

Personal details
- Born: January 27, 1963 (age 63)
- Party: Progressive Conservative

Jeff Wharton is a Canadian politician and member of the Legislative Assembly of Manitoba for Red River North, formerly serving as the Minister of Economic Development, Investment and Trade. A member of the Progressive Conservative Party of Manitoba, he was first elected in the 2016 provincial election as MLA for Gimli, and re-elected in 2019 and 2023 as MLA for Red River North.

Wharton initially ran as the Progressive Conservative candidate for Gimli in the 2011 provincial election, but lost to incumbent NDP MLA Peter Bjornson. When Bjornson retired in 2015, Wharton ran and was elected MLA for Gimli in the 2016 Manitoba election.

On August 17, 2017, Premier Brian Pallister appointed Wharton as Minister of Municipal Relations.

Following electoral boundary changes implemented in 2019, Gimli was dissolved and Wharton successfully sought election in the new constituency of Red River North.

Wharton was appointed Minister of Crown Services on September 26, 2019. He was succeeded by the Honourable Jamie Moses with the election of the NDP government in 2023. On October 24, 2023, he was appointed as the Shadow Minister for Economic Development, Investment and Trade.

== Electoral record ==
2023 Manitoba general election: Red River North
Party	Candidate	Votes	%	±%	Expenditures
Progressive Conservative	Jeff Wharton	5,926	60.35	+2.38	$24,507.31
New Democratic	Alicia Hill	3,893	39.65	+14.78	$168.00
Total valid votes/expense limit		9,819	98.56	–	$64,198.00
Total rejected and declined ballots		143	1.44	–	
Turnout		9,962	60.47	-3.49	
Eligible voters		16,474			
Progressive Conservative hold		Swing		-6.20	
Source(s) Source: Elections Manitoba

2019 Manitoba general election: Red River North
Party	Candidate	Votes	%	±%	Expenditures
Progressive Conservative	Jeff Wharton	5,569	57.97	-8.2	$24,853.38
New Democratic	Chris Pullen	2,389	24.87	+3.2	$4,288.04
Green	Graham Hnatiuk	740	7.70	–	$275.00
Liberal	Noel Ngo	735	7.65	-4.5	$0.00
Manitoba First	Jocelyn Burzuik	173	1.80	–	$1,716.07
Total valid votes		9,606	99.61		
Rejected		38	0.39		
Eligible voters / turnout		15,077	63.96		
Progressive Conservative hold		Swing		-5.7	
Source(s) Source: Manitoba. Chief Electoral Officer (2019). Statement of Votes for the 42nd Provincial General Election, September 10, 2019 (PDF) (Report). Winnipeg: Elections Manitoba. "Candidate Election Returns". Elections Manitoba. Elections Manitoba.

2016 Manitoba general election: Gimli
Party	Candidate	Votes	%	±%
Progressive Conservative	Jeff Wharton	5,614	60.53	17.25
New Democratic	Armand Bélanger	2,579	27.81	-23.72
Green	Dwight Harfield	843	9.09	5.91
Manitoba	Ed Paquette	239	2.58	–
Total valid votes		9,275	–	–
Rejected		108	–	
Eligible voters / turnout		14,226	65.96	-0.03
Source(s) Source: Manitoba. Chief Electoral Officer (2016). Statement of Votes for the 41st Provincial General Election, April 19, 2016 (PDF) (Report). Winnipeg: Elections Manitoba. "Election Returns: 41st General Election". Elections Manitoba. 2016.

2011 Manitoba general election: Gimli
Party	Candidate	Votes	%	±%	Expenditures
New Democratic	Peter Bjornson	5,012	51.52	-7.22	$37,146.57
Progressive Conservative	Jeff Wharton	4,210	43.28	9.20	$34,709.30
Green	Glenda Whiteman	309	3.18	–	$1,012.25
Liberal	Lawrence Einarsson	197	2.03	-5.16	$0.00
Total valid votes		9,728	–	–	
Rejected		17	–		
Eligible voters / turnout		14,769	65.98	3.07	
Source(s) Source: Manitoba. Chief Electoral Officer (2011). Statement of Votes for the 40th Provincial General Election, October 4, 2011 (PDF) (Report). Winnipeg: Elections Manitoba. "Election Returns: 40th General Election". Elections Manitoba. 2011.

== Controversies ==
On May 21, 2025, Wharton was one of three Tories found to have violated the province's conflict of interest law by the provinces ethics commissioner. The investigation ruled that Wharton acted improperly by pushing for an environmental license to be granted to the Sio Silica mining project after the Tories lost the 2023 election to the NDP. Wharton was subsequently stripped of his critic duties and fined $10,000.

On October 29, 2025 while Manitoba Premier Wab Kinew was speaking about the rights of vulnerable groups (including the disenfranchisement of Indigenous peoples), Wharton made a “waah, waah” sound and gesture in a sarcastic and mocking tone, after the Premier’s mention that his father was not allowed to vote.

Although no formal sanction against Wharton has been reported in connection to these incidents, the events drew media attention and raised questions about the conduct of MLAs in the chamber and the treatment of issues relating to Indigenous rights and marginalized groups.
