= Derek Johnson (politician) =

Canadian politician

Derek Johnson MLA

Minister of Agriculture
- In office January 18, 2022 – October 18, 2023
- Premier: Heather Stefanson
- Preceded by: Ralph Eichler
- Succeeded by: Ron Kostyshyn

Minister of Municipal Relations
- In office January 5, 2021 – January 18, 2022
- Premier: Brian Pallister; Kelvin Goertzen; Heather Stefanson
- Preceded by: Rochelle Squires
- Succeeded by: Eileen Clarke

Member of the Legislative Assembly of Manitoba for Interlake-Gimli Interlake (2016–2019)
- Incumbent
- Assumed office April 19, 2016
- Preceded by: Tom Nevakshonoff

RM of St. Laurent Councillor
- In office 2010–2014

Personal details
- Born: Oak Point, Manitoba, Canada
- Party: Progressive Conservative

Derek Johnson is a Canadian provincial politician, who was elected as the Member of the Legislative Assembly of Manitoba for the riding of Interlake in the 2016 election. He is a member of the Progressive Conservative party, and defeated NDP incumbent Tom Nevakshonoff in the election.

Johnson was elected again in the 2019 and 2023 general elections in the riding of Interlake-Gimli. On October 24, 2023, he was appointed as the Shadow Minister for Seniors and Long-Term Care.

== Electoral record ==
2023 Manitoba general election: Interlake-Gimli
Party	Candidate	Votes	%	±%	Expenditures
Progressive Conservative	Derek Johnson	5,143	49.59	-9.03	$40,272.35
New Democratic	Sarah Pinsent-Bardarson	4,460	43.01	+9.94	$50,266.72
Keystone	Larry Brandt	393	3.79	–	$4,816.90
Liberal	Sean James	374	3.61	-0.20	$1,617.68
Total valid votes/expense limit		10,370	99.24	–	$63,090.00
Total rejected and declined ballots		79	0.76	–	
Turnout		10,449	65.04	-0.52	
Eligible voters		16,065			
Progressive Conservative hold		Swing		-9.48	
Source(s) Source: Elections Manitoba

2019 Manitoba general election: Interlake-Gimli
Party	Candidate	Votes	%	±%	Expenditures
Progressive Conservative	Derek Johnson	6,165	58.62	-1.8	$33,875.10
New Democratic	Sarah Pinsent	3,478	33.07	+8.5	$34,329.54
Green	Dwight Harfield	473	4.50	+1.5	$0.00
Liberal	Mary Lou Bourgeois	400	3.80	-7.3	$0.00
Total valid votes		10,516	–		
Rejected		39	–		
Eligible voters / turnout		16,100	65.56		
Source(s) Source: Manitoba. Chief Electoral Officer (2019). Statement of Votes for the 42nd Provincial General Election, September 10, 2019 (PDF) (Report). Winnipeg: Elections Manitoba. "Candidate Election Returns". Elections Manitoba. Elections Manitoba.

2016 Manitoba general election: Interlake
Party	Candidate	Votes	%	±%	Expenditures
Progressive Conservative	Derek Johnson	3,685	51.32	7.90	$27,224.05
Liberal	Jamal Abas	2,068	28.80	25.90	$8,951.25
New Democratic	Tom Nevakshonoff	1,428	19.89	-30.58	$19,403.09
Total valid votes		7,181	–	–	
Rejected		58	–		
Eligible voters / turnout		11,868	61.00	7.64	
Source(s) Source: Manitoba. Chief Electoral Officer (2016). Statement of Votes for the 41st Provincial General Election, April 19, 2016 (PDF) (Report). Winnipeg: Elections Manitoba. "Election Returns: 41st General Election". Elections Manitoba. 2016.
