= Uzoma Asagwara =

Canadian politician

The Honourable Uzoma Asagwara MLA

11th Deputy Premier of Manitoba
- Incumbent
- Assumed office October 18, 2023
- Premier: Wab Kinew
- Preceded by: Cliff Cullen

Manitoba Minister of Health, Seniors and Long-term Care
- Incumbent
- Assumed office October 18, 2023
- Premier: Wab Kinew
- Preceded by: Audrey Gordon

Member of the Legislative Assembly of Manitoba for Union Station
- Incumbent
- Assumed office September 10, 2019
- Preceded by: Constituency established

Personal details
- Born: September 23, 1984 (age 42) Winnipeg, Manitoba, Canada
- Party: New Democratic
- Education: University of Winnipeg Brandon University (BScPN)
- Profession: Psychiatric nurse

Uzoma Asagwara is a Canadian politician who has served as the 11th deputy premier of Manitoba and minister of health, seniors and long term care since 2023. A member of the New Democratic Party, they have represented the Union Station electoral district in the Legislative Assembly of Manitoba since 2019. Upon their elections, Asagwara, alongside Jamie Moses and Audrey Gordon, became the first three black MLAs in Manitoba. Asagwara is also the first black and first openly LGBTQ deputy premier in the position's history.

== Early and personal life ==
Asagwara was born in Winnipeg to Igbo Nigerian parents. In 2008, Asagwara completed a Bachelor of Science in Psychiatric Nursing from the University of Winnipeg and Brandon University. Asagwara was the University of Winnipeg Female Athlete of the Year in 2005–06. In 2007 they led the Canadian Interuniversity Sport in scoring with 28.05 points per game. Asagwara was a member of the Canada women's national basketball team for two years and was part of the team at the 2007 Pan American Games. Prior to their election, Asagwara worked full-time as a registered psychiatric nurse specializing in adult and youth mental health and addictions. They are non-binary and use singular they pronoun.

Asagwara served as a member of the former Premier's Advisory Council on education, poverty, and citizenship, and as a member of the Women's Health Clinic board of directors. In 2014, Asagwara founded Queer People of Colour Winnipeg, a Winnipeg-based project which aims to promote the rights and safety of LGBTQ people of colour in the city.

== Political career ==
=== Opposition ===
In the 2019 Manitoba general election, Asagwara was elected to represent the Union Station electoral district. Asagwara, alongside Jamie Moses and Audrey Gordon, is one of the first three Black Canadian MLAs elected in Manitoba. They are also the first queer black person to win a seat and Manitoba's first gender non-conforming MLA.

While in opposition, Asagwara served as the Manitoba NDP's health critic. During their time in the legislature, Asagwara has advocated for recognition of Manitoba's minority communities, and was able to pass a bill marking Somali Heritage Week. In November 2021, Asagwara was re-nominated to represent the NDP in the Union Station riding.

=== Minister of Health, Seniors, and Long-term Care ===
Following by the victory of the NDP in 2023 Manitoba general election, Asagwara was appointed by Premier Wab Kinew as Minister of Health, Seniors and Long-term Care and Deputy Premier. In August 2024, they announced that going forward, prescription birth control would be fully covered under the Manitoba Pharmacare program at an estimated cost of $11 million dollars.

== Electoral record ==
2023 Manitoba general election: Union Station
Party	Candidate	Votes	%	±%	Expenditures
New Democratic	Uzoma Asagwara	3,714	70.78	+18.16	$11,910.44
Progressive Conservative	Aaron Croning	917	17.48	+0.32	$0.00
Liberal	Iqra Tariq	616	11.74	-6.99	$6,798.42
Total valid votes/expense limit		5,247	98.93	–	$49,273.00
Total rejected and declined ballots		57	1.07	–	
Turnout		5,304	42.21	-1.85	
Eligible voters		12,567			
New Democratic hold		Swing		+8.92	
Source(s) Source: Elections Manitoba

2019 Manitoba general election: Union Station
Party	Candidate	Votes	%	±%	Expenditures
New Democratic	Uzoma Asagwara	2,635	52.23	+13.3	$17,642.20
Liberal	Harold Davis	949	18.81	-4.0	$4,328.11
Progressive Conservative	Tara Fawcett	908	18.00	-1.6	$521.28
Green	Andrea Shalay	473	9.38	-4.8	$2,067.06
Communist	Elsa Cubas	48	0.95		$310.80
Manitoba Forward	James Yau	32	0.63		$0.00
Total valid votes		5,045	100.0		
Total rejected ballots					
Turnout			43.9		
Eligible voters					
New Democratic hold		Swing		+8.2	
