= Tracy Schmidt =

Canadian politician

The Honourable Tracy Schmidt MLA

Minister of Education and Early Childhood Learning
- Incumbent
- Assumed office January 23, 2025
- Premier: Wab Kinew
- Preceded by: Nello Altomare
- Acting; October 8, 2024 – January 23, 2025; Served during Nello Altomare’s Leave of Absence
- Premier: Wab Kinew
- Preceded by: Nello Altomare
- Succeeded by: Tracy Schmidt

Minister of Environment and Climate Change
- In office October 18, 2023 – January 23, 2025
- Premier: Wab Kinew
- Preceded by: Kevin Klein
- Succeeded by: Mike Moyes

Member of the Legislative Assembly of Manitoba for Rossmere
- Incumbent
- Assumed office October 3, 2023
- Preceded by: Andrew Micklefield

Personal details
- Born: Winnipeg, Manitoba, Canada
- Party: New Democratic
- Children: 3
- Education: University of Winnipeg (BA); University of Manitoba (JD)

Tracy Schmidt is a Canadian politician, who was elected to the Legislative Assembly of Manitoba in the 2023 Manitoba general election. She represents the district of Rossmere as a member of the Manitoba New Democratic Party.

Before being elected, Schmidt worked as a labour relations officer for the Winnipeg Association of Public Services Officers. She has also worked as a lawyer, a letter carrier and a mail clerk, where she was active in the Canadian Union of Postal Workers. She was born at the Concordia Hospital in Winnipeg.

Schmidt has a degree in Sociology and Criminal Justice from the University of Winnipeg. As well as a Law degree from the University of Manitoba, where she won the outstanding student award in 2019.

== Electoral history ==
2023 Manitoba general election: Rossmere
Party	Candidate	Votes	%	±%	Expenditures
New Democratic	Tracy Schmidt	4,863	50.74	+11.89	$28,524.95
Progressive Conservative	Andrew Micklefield	4,062	42.38	-4.53	$39,071.53
Liberal	Mike Chapin	478	4.99	-2.65	$0.00
Green	Devlin Hinchey	181	1.89	-4.72	$0.00
Total valid votes/expense limit		9,584	99.21	–	$62,315.00
Total rejected and declined ballots		76	0.79	–	
Turnout		9,660	60.42	+0.80	
Eligible voters		15,989			
New Democratic gain from Progressive Conservative		Swing		+8.21	
Source(s) Source: Elections Manitoba
