= Nahanni Fontaine =

Canadian politician (born 1971)

The Honourable Nahanni Fontaine MLA

Minister of Families
- Incumbent
- Assumed office October 18, 2023
- Premier: Wab Kinew
- Preceded by: Rochelle Squires

Member of the Legislative Assembly of Manitoba for St. Johns
- Incumbent
- Assumed office April 19, 2016
- Preceded by: Gord Mackintosh

Personal details
- Born: 1971 (age 54–55) Winnipeg, Manitoba, Canada
- Party: New Democratic
- Education: University of Winnipeg (BA); University of Manitoba (MA)

Nahanni Fontaine (born 1971) is a Canadian politician who has served as the member of the Legislative Assembly of Manitoba (MLA) for the riding of St. Johns, representing the Manitoba NDP.

== Early life and education ==
Fontaine was born in Winnipeg, Manitoba, and was raised in Point Douglas. She is a member of the Sagkeeng First Nation. She graduated from the University of Winnipeg with a Bachelor of Arts degree in environmental development, and a Master of Arts in native studies.

== Political career ==
First elected in the 2016 general election, she held the seat of St. Johns for the NDP after incumbent MLA Gord Mackintosh did not seek re-election. Fontaine was interviewed for the Tina Fontaine (no relation) episode of the Aboriginal Peoples Television Network (APTN) documentary series on Missing and Murdered Indigenous Women and Girls, Taken. She was re-elected in the 2019 election. Following the 2023 general election, Fontaine was appointed Minister of Families and Minister responsible for Accessibility and Gender Equity in Premier Wab Kinew's ministry. She is the first Indigenous woman to be named to Manitoba's Cabinet, along with Bernadette Smith. Fontaine is noted for her large social media presence.

=== Controversies ===
On 10 March 2021, Fontaine was removed from the House for the rest of the day for saying the Progressive Conservatives "just don't give a crap" about missing and murdered Indigenous women, girls, and two-spirit people.

On 26 June 2025, Fontaine, who is the minister responsible for accessibility, was caught on camera, unaware her microphone was still recording, complaining about an American Sign Language (ASL) interpreter. The hot mic moment was captured by APTN after Fontaine had delivered remarks at a graduation ceremony and was speaking with an aide as she prepared to talk to the media. "I was thrown off—it wasn't great—but, because the woman, she shouldn't have been on the stage. I couldn't see anybody on the side," Fontaine was heard saying. "All I could see was her." Fontaine then began waving her hands, to which her aide responded, describing the ASL interpreter's signing as 'frantic hand movements.' "Yeah. So, I'm like f**k, why did I have her on stage?" Fontaine said in response. "I'm like, 'Jesus.' I'm like, 'You need to leave.'"

On 4 July 2025, shortly after reporting on this incident, APTN noticed that every member of their news team had been blocked by Fontaine on social media, said APTN executive director of news and current affairs Cheryl McKenzie. The network contacted Manitoba cabinet communications that day, and, after repeated interview requests, was issued a statement from Fontaine acknowledging APTN journalists had been blocked from her social media. "Immediately upon learning that journalists were blocked on my social media account, I directed staff to reverse this decision," APTN reported Fontaine as saying.

On 12 September 2025, Premier Wab Kinew asked Fontaine to issue an apology for a social media post she shared on the day U.S. conservative activist Charlie Kirk was assassinated at Utah Valley University, describing Kirk as "a racist, xenophobic, transphobic, Islamophobic, sexist, white nationalist mouthpiece who made millions of dollars inciting hatred in this country." The post further said, "I extend absolutely no empathy for people like that." The premier said he would help Fontaine understand the need to "bring people together and not to divide people at this time." Progressive Conservative (PC) leader Obby Khan said Fontaine's apology was "obligatory and disingenuous" and he called for her to be removed from cabinet, saying that Fontaine has shown a pattern of poor conduct and doesn't have the "temperament to be a minister, especially of families and accessibility."

On 17 September 2025, former city councillor and MLA Kevin Klein wrote a column for The Winnipeg Sun, which he owns, addressing an interaction between Fontaine and one of her constituents on Instagram. A young Indigenous veteran questioned Fontaine's social media posts and record as an MLA, and Fontaine responded with, "You need a nap, little guy. And in case you don't know, women don't owe you or men anything. LOL imagine thinking YOU, a perfect stranger, a little guy, thinking YOU can demand ANYTHING from me. Go take that now, Sleep well!!" Klein expressed concern that Fontaine would openly mock a constituent, rather than engage with his concerns, noting that voices across the province have been speaking out. He shared that The Winnipeg Sun received a letter to the editor from Indigenous Elder Alfred M. Flett, who wrote, "She doesn't represent the Indigenous voices of our province. Our elders in our Indigenous communities show respect and honour to our fellow human beings."

A rally was held on 1 October 2025 calling for Fontaine’s removal from cabinet, bringing both protestors and counter-protestors to the grounds of the Manitoba Legislative Building. Organizers said the rally was held after Fontaine shared a social media post about the murder of American conservative activist Charlie Kirk, shortly after the violent crime took place. "We’re not saying that she should be removed from caucus, but we do think that she should be removed from her duties, especially as the minister of families", said Wayne Sturby, who spoke at the rally. "We just think that our politicians… need to conduct themselves in an ethically and highly moral way", he said, adding that the written apology Fontaine issued afterward wasn’t convincingly genuine or sincere to "a lot of Manitobans". The rally also attracted many counter-protestors, who sat upon the Legislative Building front steps, some drumming or speaking into a megaphone. Alaya McIvor was among the counter-protestors and said Fontaine has been the subject of violence in the past few weeks, including having her office vandalized. In September 2025, several windows were vandalized at Fontaine’s constituency office and the building caught fire. In a speech inside the legislative chamber, Premier Wab Kinew said, "And I would say to the goofballs out front, 'If you have an issue, you have an issue with me. I am the one who decided to keep this minister at the cabinet table.'" Kinew called on PC Leader Obby Khan to "tell the people … that you should not be protesting a minister of the Crown’s right to serve the people of Manitoba". Khan then accused Kinew of trying to "silence" the voices of Manitobans. "Democracy, freedom of speech, debate, these are all healthy things in this province", said Khan. "What is not healthy is when the premier and the minister of families show no empathy for someone who was murdered for expressing those rights." He said he has tabled more than 450 emails received by his party who want Fontaine removed from cabinet.

== Personal life ==
She is the niece of musician Vince Fontaine.

== Awards ==
- Governor General's Award in Commemoration of the Persons Case (2013)

== Electoral record ==
2023 Manitoba general election: St. Johns
Party	Candidate	Votes	%	±%	Expenditures
New Democratic	Nahanni Fontaine	4,262	60.76	+8.88	$19,847.75
Independent	Patrick Allard	1,117	15.92	–	$17,543.47
Progressive Conservative	Teddy Rubenstein	1,101	15.69	-8.78	$0.00
Liberal	Dennis Yaeger	535	7.63	-8.62	$0.00
Total valid votes/expense limit		7,015	99.53	–	$58,447.00
Total rejected, unmarked and declined ballots		33	0.47	–	
Turnout		7,048	46.98	-0.36	
Eligible voters		15,003			
New Democratic hold		Swing		-3.52	
Source(s) Source: Elections Manitoba

2019 Manitoba general election: St. Johns
Party	Candidate	Votes	%	±%	Expenditures
New Democratic	Nahanni Fontaine	3,526	51.2	+14.15	$10,974.72
Progressive Conservative	Ray Larkin	1,665	24.2	-5.17	$521.28
Liberal	Eddie Calisto-Tavares	1,092	15.9	-7.12	$518.13
Green	Joshua McNeil	601	8.7	-1.84	$0.00
Total valid votes			100.0		
Total rejected ballots					
Turnout					
Eligible voters					

2016 Manitoba general election: St. Johns
Party	Candidate	Votes	%	±%	Expenditures
New Democratic	Nahanni Fontaine	2,358	37.05	-28.05	$28,122.25
Progressive Conservative	Barbara Judt	1,869	29.37	+7.22	$9,267.93
Liberal	Noel Bernier	1,465	23.02	+17.53	$19,281.67
Green	Elizabeth Puchailo	671	10.54	+4.36	$0.00
Total valid votes/expense limit		6,363	100.0		$40,783.00
Declined and rejected ballots		93	–	–	
Turnout		6,456	51.43	–	
Eligible voters		12,554			
Source: Elections Manitoba
