= Mike Moyes =

Canadian politician

The Honourable Mike Moyes MLA

Minister of Environment and Climate Change
- Incumbent
- Assumed office January 23, 2025
- Premier: Wab Kinew
- Preceded by: Tracy Schmidt

Member of the Legislative Assembly of Manitoba for Riel
- Incumbent
- Assumed office October 3, 2023
- Preceded by: Rochelle Squires

Personal details
- Born: November 9, 1980 (age 45)
- Party: New Democratic
- Spouse: Michelle Moyes
- Children: 2

Mike Moyes is a Canadian politician, who was elected to the Legislative Assembly of Manitoba in the 2023 Manitoba general election. He represents the district of Riel as a member of the New Democratic Party of Manitoba. Moyes is currently the Minister of Environment and Climate Change. He previously served as Legislative Assistant to Environment and Climate Change and Education and Early Childhood Learning and was the NDP Caucus Chair.

Before his election to the legislature, Moyes was a teacher at Glenlawn Collegiate. He defeated Progressive Conservative cabinet minister Rochelle Squires to win his seat. He had previously unsuccessfully challenged Squires in 2019.

== Electoral results ==
2023 Manitoba general election: Riel
Party	Candidate	Votes	%	±%	Expenditures
New Democratic	Mike Moyes	6,160	54.65	+19.26	$31,115.65
Progressive Conservative	Rochelle Squires	4,278	37.95	-6.80	$37,725.59
Liberal	LéAmber Kensley	834	7.40	-6.51	$2,610.52
Total valid votes/expense limit		11,272	99.23	–	$67,371.00
Total rejected and declined ballots		88	0.77	–	
Turnout		11,360	65.70	+2.46	
Eligible voters		17,291			
New Democratic gain from Progressive Conservative		Swing		+13.03	
Source(s) Source: Elections Manitoba

2019 Manitoba general election: Riel
Party	Candidate	Votes	%	±%	Expenditures
Progressive Conservative	Rochelle Squires	4,734	44.75	-6.2	$40,281.22
New Democratic	Mike Moyes	3,744	35.39	+6.3	$19,468.95
Liberal	Neil Johnston	1,471	13.90	-5.5	$773.76
Green	Roger Schellenberg	630	5.96	+5.3	$5.54
Total valid votes		10,579	99.13		
Total rejected ballots		93	0.87		
Turnout		10,672	63.24		
Eligible voters		16,875			
Progressive Conservative hold		Swing		-6.2	
