= Legislative Assembly of Manitoba =

Deliberative assembly of Manitoba

Legislative Assembly of Manitoba Assemblée législative du Manitoba
- 43rd Manitoba Legislature
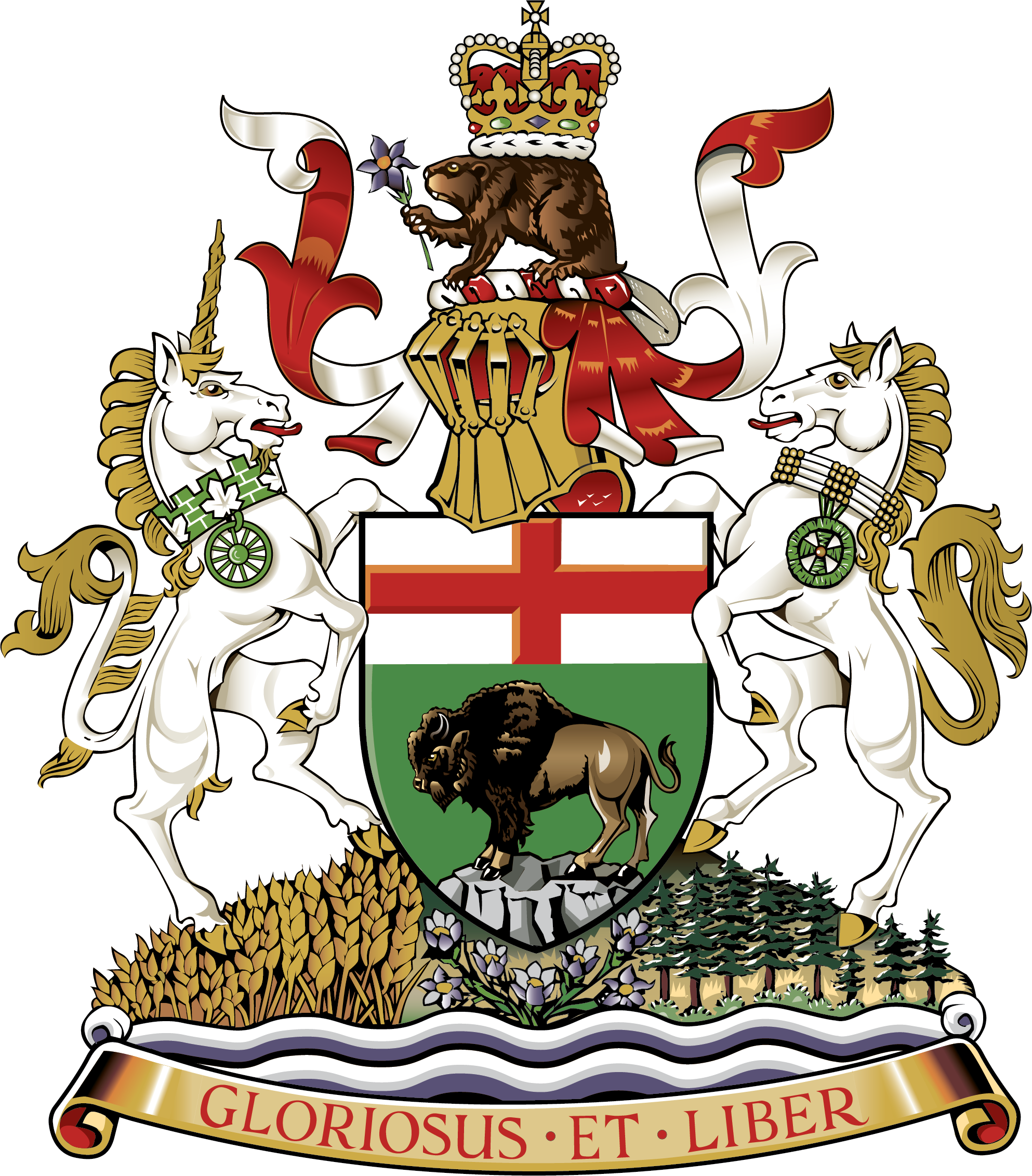

Type
- Type: Lower house (1870–1876) then unicameral house of the Manitoba Legislature

History
- Founded: 1870

Leadership
- Speaker: Tom Lindsey, NDP
- Premier: Wab Kinew, NDP
- Leader of the Official Opposition: Konrad Narth, PC
- Government House Leader: Nahanni Fontaine, NDP
- Official Opposition House Leader: Derek Johnson, PC

Structure
- Seats: 57
- Political groups: His Majesty's Government: New Democratic (34); His Majesty's Loyal Opposition: Progressive Conservative (19); Other parties: Liberal (1); Independents (3)
- Committees: Agriculture and Food; Crown Corporations; Human Resources; Justice; Legislative Affairs; Private Bills; Public Accounts; Social and Economic Development

Elections
- Voting system: First-past-the-post
- Last election: October 3, 2023
- Next election: On or before October 5, 2027

Meeting place
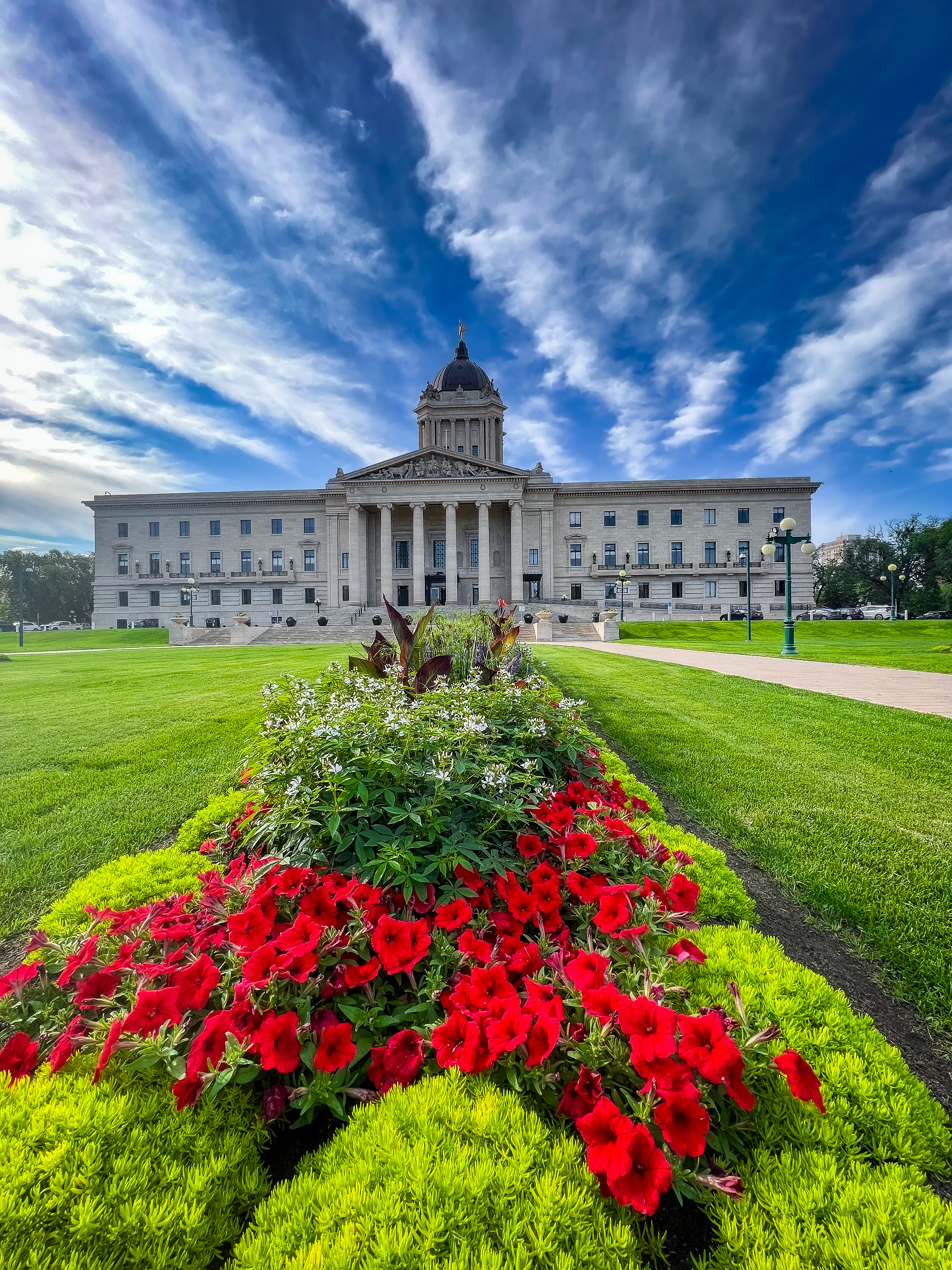
- Flowers in front of the Legislative

Website
- www.gov.mb.ca/legislature

The Legislative Assembly of Manitoba (French: Assemblée législative du Manitoba) is the deliberative assembly of the Manitoba Legislature in the Canadian province of Manitoba. Fifty-seven members are elected to this assembly at provincial general elections, all in single-member constituencies with first-past-the-post voting. Bills passed by the Legislative Assembly are given royal assent by the lieutenant governor of Manitoba in the name of the King of Canada. The Manitoba Legislative Building is located in central Winnipeg.

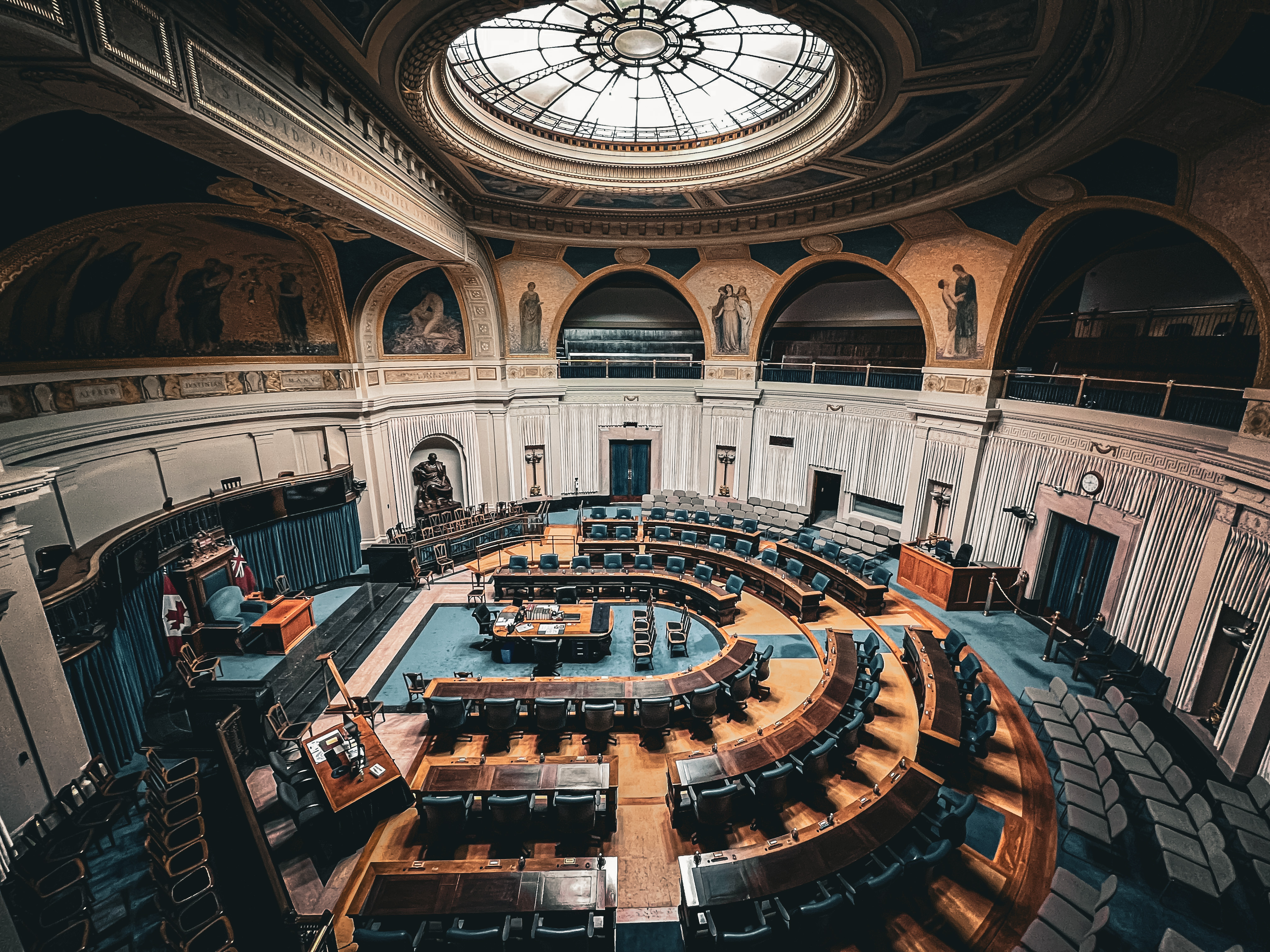
The Legislative Chamber

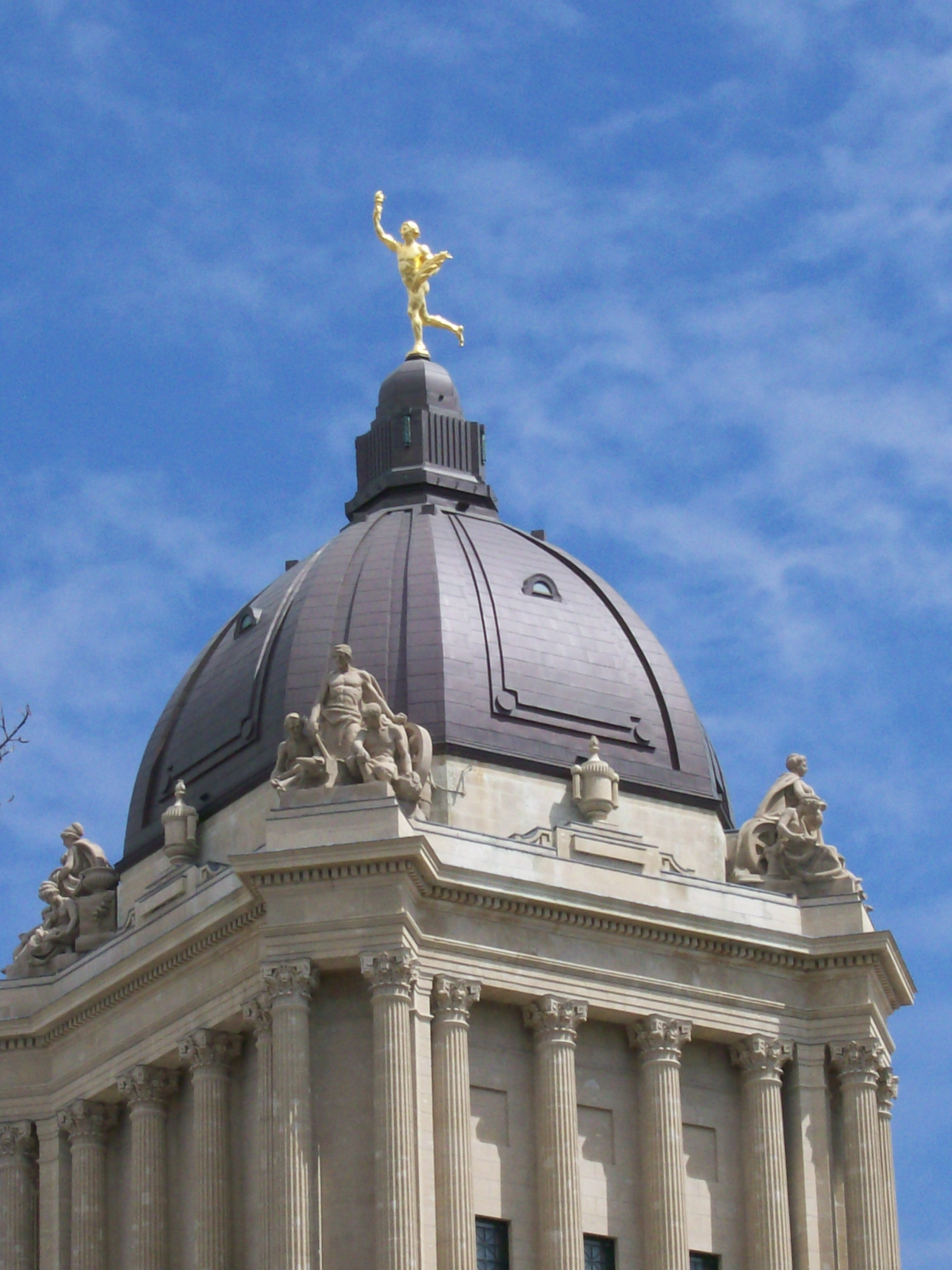
The Golden Boy, or "Eternal Youth"

The premier of Manitoba is Wab Kinew, and the speaker of the Legislative Assembly of Manitoba is Tom Lindsey. Both are members of the New Democratic Party.

Historically, the Legislature of Manitoba had another chamber, the Legislative Council of Manitoba, but this was abolished in 1876, just six years after the province was formed.

The 42nd Legislature was dissolved on September 5, 2023, and a general election was called for October 3. The 43rd Legislature opened on November 9.

== Current members ==
- Members in **bold** are in the Cabinet of Manitoba.
- Party leaders are italicized.
- ^{*} Member with non-continuous service
- ^{†} Speaker of the Assembly

Riding	Party	MLA	First elected / previously elected	No.# of term(s)
Agassiz	Progressive Conservative	Jodie Byram	2023	1st term
Assiniboia	New Democratic	**Nellie Kennedy**	2023	1st term
Borderland	Progressive Conservative	Josh Guenter	2019	2nd term
Brandon East	New Democratic	**Glen Simard**	2023	1st term
Brandon West	Progressive Conservative	Wayne Balcaen	2023	1st term
Burrows	New Democratic	Diljeet Brar	2019	2nd term
Concordia	New Democratic	**Matt Wiebe**	2010	5th term
Dauphin	New Democratic	**Ron Kostyshyn**	2011, 2023	2nd term*
Dawson Trail	Independent	Bob Lagassé	2016	3rd term
Elmwood	New Democratic	Jim Maloway	1986, 2011	11th term*
Flin Flon	New Democratic	Tom Lindsey†	2016	3rd term
Fort Garry	Independent	Mark Wasyliw	2019	2nd term
Fort Richmond	New Democratic	Jennifer Chen	2023	1st term
Fort Rouge	New Democratic	**Wab Kinew**	2016	3rd term
Fort Whyte	Independent	Obby Khan	2022	2nd term
Interlake-Gimli	Progressive Conservative	Derek Johnson	2016	3rd term
Keewatinook	New Democratic	Ian Bushie	2019	2nd term
Kildonan-River East	New Democratic	Rachelle Schott	2023	1st term
Kirkfield Park	New Democratic	Logan Oxenham	2023	1st term
La Verendrye	Progressive Conservative	Konrad Narth	2023	1st term
Lac du Bonnet	Progressive Conservative	Wayne Ewasko	2011	4th term
Lagimodière	New Democratic	Tyler Blashko	2023	1st term
Lakeside	Progressive Conservative	Trevor King	2023	1st term
McPhillips	New Democratic	Jasdeep Devgan	2023	1st term
Midland	Progressive Conservative	Lauren Stone	2023	1st term
Morden-Winkler	Progressive Conservative	Carrie Hiebert	2023	1st term
Notre Dame	New Democratic	**Malaya Marcelino**	2019	2nd term
Point Douglas	New Democratic	**Bernadette Smith**	2017	3rd term
Portage la Prairie	Progressive Conservative	Jeff Bereza	2023	1st term
Radisson	New Democratic	Jelynn Dela Cruz	2023	1st term
Red River North	Progressive Conservative	Jeff Wharton	2016	3rd term
Riding Mountain	Progressive Conservative	Greg Nesbitt	2016	3rd term
Riel	New Democratic	**Mike Moyes**	2023	1st term
River Heights	New Democratic	**Mike Moroz**	2023	1st term
Roblin	Progressive Conservative	Kathleen Cook	2023	1st term
Rossmere	New Democratic	**Tracy Schmidt**	2023	1st term
Seine River	New Democratic	Billie Cross	2023	1st term
Selkirk	Progressive Conservative	Richard Perchotte	2023	1st term
Southdale	New Democratic	**Renée Cable**	2023	1st term
Springfield-Ritchot	Progressive Conservative	Ron Schuler	1999	7th term
Spruce Woods	Progressive Conservative	Colleen Robbins	2025	1st term
St. Boniface	New Democratic	Robert Loiselle	2023	1st term
St. James	New Democratic	**Adrien Sala**	2019	2nd term
St. Johns	New Democratic	**Nahanni Fontaine**	2016	3rd term
St. Vital	New Democratic	**Jamie Moses**	2019	2nd term
Steinbach	Progressive Conservative	Kelvin Goertzen	2003	6th term
Swan River	Progressive Conservative	Rick Wowchuk	2016	3rd term
The Maples	New Democratic	**Mintu Sandhu**	2019	2nd term
The Pas-Kameesak	New Democratic	Jennifer Flett	2026	1st term
Thompson	New Democratic	Eric Redhead	2022	2nd term
Transcona	New Democratic	Shannon Corbett	2025	1st term
Turtle Mountain	Progressive Conservative	Doyle Piwniuk	2014	4th term
Tuxedo	New Democratic	Carla Compton	2024	1st term
Tyndall Park	Liberal	Cindy Lamoureux	2016	3rd term
Union Station	New Democratic	**Uzoma Asagwara**	2019	2nd term
Waverley	New Democratic	David Pankratz	2023	1st term
Wolseley	New Democratic	**Lisa Naylor**	2019	2nd term

=== Seating plan ===
Affiliation	Members
New Democratic Party	34
Progressive Conservative	19
Liberal Party	1
Independent	3
Vacant	0
**Total seats**	**57**
**Government majority**	**11**

The seating arrangement is viewable at the official website.
