= 2011 Manitoba general election =

Election in province of Canada

- October 4, 2011

57 seats of the Legislative Assembly of Manitoba 29 seats are needed for a majority
- Opinion polls
- Turnout: 55.77%
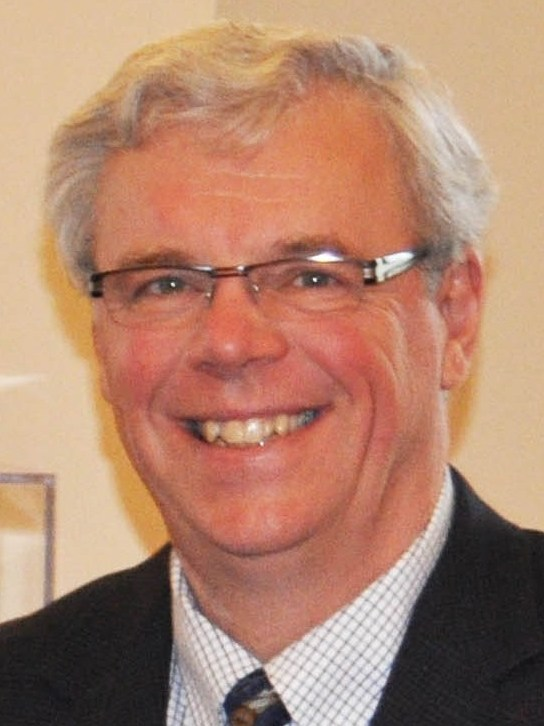

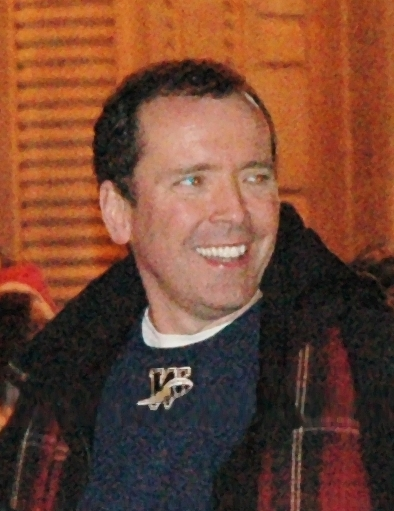

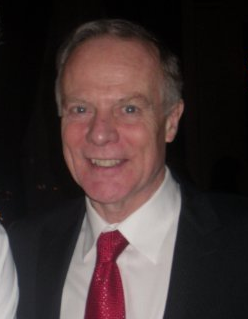
	First party	Second party	Third party
Leader	Greg Selinger	Hugh McFadyen	Jon Gerrard
Party	New Democratic	Progressive Conservative	Liberal
Leader since	October 17, 2009	April 29, 2006	October 17, 1998
Leader's seat	St. Boniface	Fort Whyte	River Heights
Last election	36 seats, 48.00%	19 seats, 37.89%	2 seats, 12.39%
Seats won	37	19	1
Seat change	▲1	Steady	▼1
Popular vote	199,066	188,528	32,420
Percentage	46.16%	43.71%	7.52%
Swing	▼1.84%	▲5.97%	▼4.60%
- Popular vote by riding. As this is an FPTP election, seat totals are not determined by popular vote, but instead via results by each riding.
Premier before election
Greg Selinger
New Democratic
Premier after election
Greg Selinger
New Democratic

The 2011 Manitoba general election was held to elect Members of the Legislative Assembly of Manitoba. It took place on October 4, 2011, due to the new fixed-date election laws. In the outgoing legislature, the New Democratic Party of Manitoba (NDP) held 37 of the 57 seats, the Progressive Conservative Party of Manitoba (PC Party) held 19 of the 57 seats and the Liberal Party of Manitoba held one of the 57 seats, after Kevin Lamoureux resigned his seat in the riding of Inkster to run as a Liberal candidate in a federal by-election.

Following the last census, electoral district boundaries were adjusted. There are 57 electoral districts.

Despite being perceived as a tight race in the run-up to voting, with The Globe and Mail expecting it to be the "closest in more than a decade", the NDP won its fourth consecutive term in government, taking 37 seats, an improvement of one from the 2007 election – thus gaining their largest majority ever in the Assembly – whilst the Progressive Conservatives failed to make any gains beyond closing the gap in the popular vote, and not a single incumbent was defeated. The PC leader Hugh McFadyen announced shortly thereafter that he would resign his post. Also facing a disappointing result in the election, Liberal leader Jon Gerrard also announced shortly after the election that he would resign his post once the party crowned a new leader in 2013.

== Reorganization of electoral divisions ==
In 2006, the Electoral Divisions Act was amended to provide for the creation of a permanent commission to determine any necessary redistribution of seats in the Legislative Assembly by the end of 2008, and then every tenth year thereafter. Its final report would take effect upon the dissolution of the relevant Legislature. Following a series of hearings and an interim report, the commission's final report was issued in December 2008, which provided for the following changes:

Abolished ridings	New ridings
New ridings
	Dawson Trail (Note: from parts of La Vérendrye and Morris)
Reorganization of ridings
Carman; Pembina	Midland; Morden-Winkler
Dauphin-Roblin; Ste. Rose	Agassiz; Dauphin
Merger of ridings
Minnedosa; Russell	Riding Mountain
Renaming of ridings
Fort Garry	Fort Richmond
Inkster	Tyndall Park
Lord Roberts	Fort Garry-Riverview (Note: with parts going to Fort Rouge and River Heights)
Rupertsland	Kewatinook
Springfield	St. Paul
Turtle Mountain	Spruce Woods
Wellington	Logan

== Incumbents not contesting their seats ==
Retiring
Party	Riding	Incumbent
NDP	Burrows	Doug Martindale
NDP	Elmwood	Bill Blaikie
NDP	Flin Flon	Gerard Jennissen
NDP	Lord Roberts	Diane McGifford
NDP	Point Douglas	George Hickes
NDP	St. James	Bonnie Korzeniowski
NDP	St. Norbert	Marilyn Brick
NDP	Swan River	Rosann Wowchuk
Progressive Conservative	Brandon West	Rick Borotsik
Progressive Conservative	Lac du Bonnet	Gerald Hawranik
Progressive Conservative	Pembina	Peter George Dyck
Progressive Conservative	Portage la Prairie	David Faurschou
Progressive Conservative	Russell	Len Derkach
Resigned
Liberal	Inkster	Kevin Lamoureux

== Party leaderships ==
The Green Party and the NDP chose new leaders since the last general election.

On August 27, 2009 Premier Gary Doer, after being Premier of Manitoba for ten years announced his resignation as Premier and leader of the NDP. The following day he was appointed Canada's Ambassador to the United States.

Three candidates entered the campaign to replace Doer: Steve Ashton, Greg Selinger and Andrew Swan. On September 28, 2009, Swan bowed out of the race and endorsed Selinger. Some pundits believe this was an attempt to stop Steve Ashton from becoming leader.

Ashton, first seen as a minor candidate, ended up being a heavy-weight and, gaining momentum, scored big victories in some ridings, however it wasn't enough to convince many MLAs or win union endorsement. Selinger won the leadership election on October 17, 2009 with 65.75% of the ballot. His victory was achieved in large part by being backed by unions and the vast majority of the party elite.

2009 New Democratic Party of Manitoba leadership election
Candidate	Votes	Percentage
Greg Selinger	1,317	65.75%
Steve Ashton	685	34.20%
Spoiled ballots	1	0.05%
Total	2,003	100.00%

The Green Party elected James Beddome to a two-year term party leader on November 15, 2008, defeating incumbent Andrew Basham and third candidate Shane Nestruck. After his victory, he said that he would work toward running a full slate of candidates in the next provincial election. He was the party's candidate for a by-election in the northeast Winnipeg division of Elmwood in early 2009.

== Election campaign ==
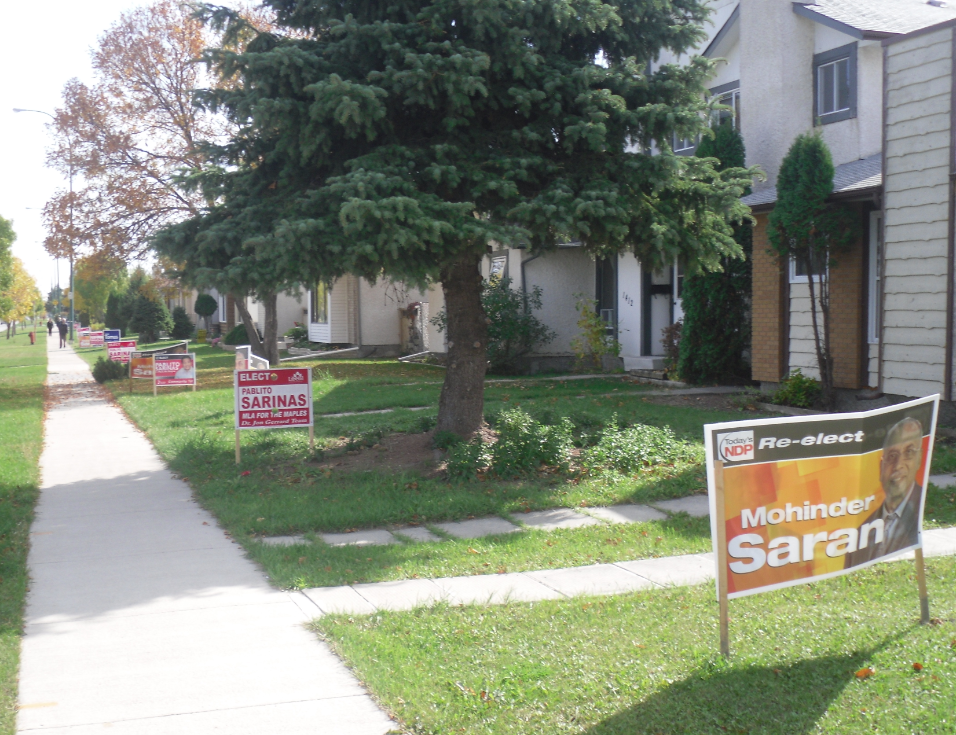
Election signs for the major parties in the riding of The Maples.

=== Issues ===
==== Bipole III ====
Manitoba Hydro planned an alternative hydro-electric transmission line to Bipole I and II routes running through the Interlake region in Manitoba. Initially it planned a more easterly route to the east of Lake Winnipeg. The NDP ignored the expert opinion of Manitoba Hydro and decided to build the line on the west side of the province at a cost of $4.1 billion. Further, the NDP proposed the creation of a large UNESCO environmental heritage site named Pimachiowin Aki. Just days before his retirement as premier, Doer announced that the government would donate $10 million to the trust fund for UNESCO World Heritage site on the east side of Lake Winnipeg. The NDP claimed that an east side Bipole III route would jeopardise the UNESCO site and claimed that a heritage site would benefit First Nations communities more. The NDP proposed a longer, more expensive, alternative route through the west of Manitoba to preserve the environmental integrity of the east side. Subject to the Environmental Impact Statement to be completed in June 2011, the construction of the line will begin in the winter of 2012, one year after the election.

Progressive Conservative leader Hugh McFadyen opposes the western route stating that it would cost $1 billion to $1.75 billion more, it would destroy more trees, 15 out of 16 First Nations believed the Bipole III would be more economically beneficial, and would be more at risk from disasters as the Bipole lines in the Interlake. McFadyen promised that if elected he would cancel the western route, and build it down the east side. McFadyen also supported the UNESCO site on the east side and claims that Bipole III would not jeopardise the World Heritage Site.

Liberal leader Jon Gerrard proposed that instead of building the line down the east or west, Manitoba Hydro should put the cable under Lake Winnipeg as proposed by Dr. John Ryan, retired University of Winnipeg professor in 2008. In the fall of 2010 Gerrard asked Manitoba Hydro CEO Bob Brennan if he had inquired into the Lake Winnipeg route. Brennan said that he had not. Gerrard promised to build the line through Lake Winnipeg if elected.

=== Opinion polls ===
Polling firm	Last date of polling	Link	NDP	PC	Liberal	Green	Other
Angus Reid Public Opinion	September 30 – October 2, 2011		46	43	8	3	0
Probe Research Inc	September 21–28, 2011	(Note: "Archived copy" (PDF). probe-research.com. Archived from the original (PDF) on April 5, 2012.)	46	43	7	4	
Environics	September 26, 2011		42	45	10		
Viewpoints Research	September 14–21, 2011		41	32	5		
Probe Research Inc	June 29, 2011	(Note: "Archived copy" (PDF). probe-research.com. Archived from the original (PDF) on March 23, 2012.)	44	44	9		3
Probe Research Inc	March 23, 2011	(Note: "Archived copy" (PDF). probe-research.com. Archived from the original (PDF) on August 25, 2011.)	35	47	14		4
Probe Research Inc	November 25–Dec. 12, 2010	(Note: "Archived copy" (PDF). probe-research.com. Archived from the original (PDF) on July 15, 2011.)	38	42	15		5
Angus Reid Public Opinion	November 7–15, 2010	(Note: "Archived copy" (PDF). www.angus-reid.com. Archived from the original on June 17, 2011.)	37	46	13	4	1
Probe Research Inc	September 30, 2010	(Note: "Archived copy" (PDF). probe-research.com. Archived from the original (PDF) on July 15, 2011.)	40	42	12		6
Angus Reid Public Opinion	September 21, 2010	(Note: http://www.visioncritical.com/wp-content/uploads/2010/09/2010.09.21_Politics_MB.pdf)	34	49	12	4	1
Viewpoints Research	September 15, 2010		39	38	14	8	1
Probe Research Inc	July 3, 2010	(Note: "Archived copy" (PDF). probe-research.com. Archived from the original (PDF) on July 15, 2011.)	41	40	13		6
Angus Reid Public Opinion	June 10, 2010	(Note: "Archived copy" (PDF). www.visioncritical.com. Archived from the original (PDF) on July 20, 2011.)	36	48	12	3	1
Probe Research Inc	March 29, 2010	(Note: http://news.probe-research.com/2010/03/provincial-party-standings-march-2010.html)	42	39	11	8	0
Angus Reid Public Opinion	March 18, 2010		37	44	13	3	3
Probe Research Inc	December 2009	(Note: http://news.probe-research.com/2010/03/provincial-party-standings-march-2010.html/)	47	37	11	4	1
Probe Research Inc	September 2009		45	38	12		5
Probe Research Inc	July 2009		45	36	14		5
Environics	June 2009		43	35	22		
Environics	April 2009		49	37	12		2
Probe Research Inc	March 2009		46	36	13		5
Probe Research Inc	December 2008		41	43	10		6
Probe Research Inc	September 2008		43	39	13		5
Probe Research Inc	June 2008		46	36	13		5
Probe Research Inc	March 2008		46	38	13		3
Election 2007	May 22, 2007		48.00%	37.89%	12.39%	1.34%	0.39%
Polling firm	Last date of polling	Link					Other
Polling firm	Last date of polling	Link	NDP	PC	Liberal	Green	Other

=== Leadership approval rating ===
Polling Firm	Date of Polling	Link	Greg Selinger	Hugh McFadyen	Jon Gerrard
Probe Research Inc	July 3, 2010		49	41	35
	Disapproval rating		22	26	29

== Results ==
Of 777,054 registered voters, 55.77% or 433,346 cast votes in the election. Although this is slightly lower than the 2007 election, voter turnout in Manitoba has generally declined since the mid-1970s when it reached 78.3% in the 1973 general election. About 78,500 voters took advantage of advance polls, more than any previous election.

Summary of the October 4, 2011 Manitoba Legislature election
Party	Party leader	Candidates	Seats				Popular vote		
Party	Party leader	Candidates	2007	Dissol.	**2011**	% Change	#	%	% Change
New Democratic	Greg Selinger	57	36	36	37	+2.78%	199,069	46.16	−1.84
Progressive Conservative	Hugh McFadyen	57	19	18	19	0.00%	188,535	43.71	+5.97
Liberal	Jon Gerrard	57	2	1	1	−50.00%	32,418	7.52	−4.60
Green	James Beddome	32	0	0	0	−	10,886	2.52	+1.18
Communist	Darrell Rankin	4	0	0	0	−	179	0.04	-0.05
Independent		1	0	0	0	−	215	0.05	-0.25
Vacant				2					
**Total Valid Votes**		**208**	**57**	**57**	**57**	−	**431,302**	**55.77%**	**-0.98%**

=== Vote and seat summaries ===
Ternary plots – shift of electoral support (2007–2011)
2007

2011
Electoral districts identified by colours of winning parties

Popular vote
New Democratic	46.16%
PC	43.71%
Liberal	7.52%
Green	2.52%
Others	0.09%

Seat Count
New Democratic	64.91%
PC	33.33%
Liberal	1.75%

=== Results by riding ===
- Note that names in **bold** type represent Cabinet members, while italics represent party leaders.

==== Northern Manitoba ====
Electoral district	Candidates					Incumbent
Electoral district	NDP	PC	Liberal	Green	Other	Incumbent
Flin Flon	Clarence Pettersen; 1,901 (57.10%)	Darcy Linklater; 791 (23.76%)	Thomas Heine; 510 (15.31%)	Saara Harvie; 110 (3.30%)		Gerard Jennissen
Kewatinook	**Eric Robinson**; 2,043 (56.79%)	Michael Birch; 1,389 (38.61%)	Orville Woodford; 49 (1.36%)	Philip Green; 94 (2.61%)		**Eric Robinson**
Swan River	Ron Kostyshyn; 4,280 (55.81%)	Dave Powell; 3,078 (40.14%)	Reynald Cook; 264 (3.44%)			**Rosann Wowchuk**
The Pas	Frank Whitehead; 2,995 (73.20%)	Alfred McDonald; 959 (23.44%)	Girma Tessema; 115 (2.81%)			Frank Whitehead
Thompson	**Steve Ashton**; 2,586 (68.19%)	Anita Campbell; 1,068 (28.16%)	Ken Dillen; 120 (3.16%)			**Steve Ashton**

==== Westman/Parkland ====
Electoral district	Candidates					Incumbent
Electoral district	NDP	PC	Liberal	Green	Other	Incumbent
Agassiz	Amity Sagness; 1,058 (17.13%)	Stu Briese; 4,390 (71.09%)	Gary Sallows; 410 (6.64%)	Kate Storey; 317 (5.13%)		New District
Arthur-Virden	Garry Draper; 2,274 (30.18%)	Larry Maguire; 4,975 (66.03%)	Murray Cliff; 286 (3.80%)			Larry Maguire
Brandon East	Drew Caldwell; 3,533 (54.77%)	Mike Waddell; 2,513 (38.75%)	Shaun Cameron; 280 (4.23%)	Vanda Fleury; 158 (2.45%)		Drew Caldwell
Brandon West	Jim Murray; 4,073 (46.98%)	Reg Helwer; 4,219 (48.66%)	George Buri; 378 (4.36%)			Rick Borotsik
Dauphin	**Stan Struthers**; 4,470 (54.91%)	Lloyd McKinney; 3,351 (41.17%)	Sisay Tessema; 123 (1.51%)	Tamela Friesen; 196 (2.41%)		New District
Riding Mountain	Albert Parsons; 2,604 (34.26%)	Leanne Rowat; 4,461 (58.69%)	Carl Hyde; 270 (3.55%)	Signe Knutson; 266 (3.50%)		New District
Spruce Woods	Cory Szczepanski; 1,923 (28.58%)	Cliff Cullen; 4,487 (66.69%)	Trenton Zazalak; 318 (4.73%)			New District

==== Central Manitoba ====
Electoral district	Candidates					Incumbent
Electoral district	NDP	PC	Liberal	Green	Other	Incumbent
Emerson	Lorie Fiddler; 1,082 (19.76%)	Cliff Graydon; 3,983 (72.72%)	Micheline Belliveau; 412 (7.52%)			Cliff Graydon
Gimli	**Peter Bjornson**; 5,004 (51.79%)	Jeff Wharton; 4,154 (42.99%)	Lawrence Einarsson; 195 (2.02%)	Glenda Whiteman; 309 (3.20%)		**Peter Bjornson**
Interlake	Tom Nevakshonoff; 3,359 (50.47%)	Steve Lupky; 2,899 (43.56%)	Albert Ratt; 184 (2.76%)		John Zasitko; 213 (3.20%)	Tom Nevakshonoff
Lakeside	Rosemary Hnatiuk; 1,956 (25.71%)	Ralph Eichler; 5,036 (66.20%)	Jerald Funk; 246 (3.23%)	Betty Kehler; 369 (4.85%)		Ralph Eichler
Midland	Jacqueline Theroux; 1,746 (23.64%)	Blaine Pedersen; 5,133 (69.50%)	Leah Jeffers; 507 (6.86%)			New District
Morden-Winkler	Aaron McDowell; 656 (11.43%)	Cameron Friesen; 4,912 (85.56%)	Daniel Woldeyohanis; 173 (3.01%)			New District
Morris	Mohamed Alli; 1,480 (19.33%)	Mavis Taillieu; 5,669 (74.06%)	Janelle Mailhot; 506 (6.61%)			Mavis Taillieu
Portage la Prairie	James Kostuchuk; 2,689 (39.39%)	Ian Wishart; 3,556 (52.24%)	Michelle Cudmore-Armstrong; 571 (8.37%)			David Faurschou

==== Eastman ====
Electoral district	Candidates					Incumbent
Electoral district	NDP	PC	Liberal	Green	Other	Incumbent
Dawson Trail	**Ron Lemieux**; 4,284 (52.51%)	Laurent Tetrault; 3,554 (43.56%)	Sandra Hoskins; 321 (3.93%)			New District
Lac du Bonnet	Elana Spence; 2,853 (36.74%)	Wayne Ewasko; 4,266 (54.94%)	Charlett Millen; 351 (4.52%)	Dan Green; 295 (3.80%)		Vacant
La Verendrye	Maurice Tallaire; 1,823 (25.94%)	Dennis Smook; 4,480 (63.75%)	Monica Guetre; 372 (5.31%)	Janine Gibson; 351 (5.00%)		Ron Lemieux
Steinbach	Dally Gutierrez; 487 (7.62%)	Kelvin Goertzen; 5,469 (85.52%)	Lee Fehler; 439 (6.86%)			Kelvin Goertzen
St. Paul	Cynthia Ryan; 3,479 (37.40%)	Ron Schuler; 5,547 (59.63%)	Ludolf Grollé; 276 (2.97%)			New District
Selkirk	Greg Dewar; 3,882 (56.35%)	David Bell; 2,703 (39.24%)	Marilyn Courchene; 304 (4.41%)			Greg Dewar

==== Northwest Winnipeg ====
Electoral district	Candidates					Incumbent
Electoral district	NDP	PC	Liberal	Green	Other	Incumbent
Burrows	Melanie Wight; 3,063 (59.35%)	Rick Negrych; 1,314 (25.58%)	Twyla Motkaluk; 629 (12.18%)	Garett Peepeetch; 124 (2.29%)	Frank Komarniski (CPC-M); 32 (0.61%)	Doug Martindale
Kildonan	**Dave Chomiak**; 4,808 (59.52%)	Darrell Penner; 2,880 (35.65%)	Dimitrius Sagriotis; 391 (4.83%)			**Dave Chomiak**
Point Douglas	Kevin Chief; 3,806 (73.50%)	John Vernaus; 917 (17.95%)	Mary Lou Bourgeois; 257 (4.51%)	Teresa Pun; 176 (3.32%)	Darrell Rankin (CPC-M); 38 (0.71%)	George Hickes
St. Johns	**Gord Mackintosh**; 4,157 (65.93%)	Ray Larkin; 1,405 (22.40%)	Trevor Mueller; 348 (5.48%)	Alon Weinberg; 392 (6.20%)		**Gord Mackintosh**
The Maples	Mohinder Saran; 3,894 (51.8%)	Jose Tomas; 1,943 (25.9%)	Pablito Sarinas; 1,395 (18.57%)	John Redekopp; 281 (3.73%)		Mohinder Saran
Tyndall Park	Ted Marcelino; 2,596 (44.93%)	Cris Aglugub; 908 (15.79%)	Roldan Sevillano; 2,007 (34.94%)	Dean Koshelanyk; 237 (4.34%)		New District

==== Northeast Winnipeg ====
Electoral district	Candidates					Incumbent
Electoral district	NDP	PC	Liberal	Green	Other	Incumbent
Concordia	Matt Wiebe; 4,008 (62.72%)	Naseer Warraich; 1,803 (28.21%)	Isaiah Oyeleru; 237 (3.70%)	Ryan Poirier; 308 (4.82%)		Matt Wiebe
Elmwood	Jim Maloway; 3,864 (54.14%)	David Hutten; 2,399 (33.61%)	Anthony Dratowany; 467 (6.54%)	Ray Eskritt; 346 (4.84%)		**Bill Blaikie**
Radisson	Bidhu Jha; 5,033 (54.94%)	Desmond Penner; 3,588 (39.17%)	Shirley Robert; 506 (5.52%)			Bidhu Jha
River East	Kurt Penner; 4,512 (43.92%)	Bonnie Mitchelson; 5,247 (51.07%)	Christopher Pelda; 188 (1.83%)	Kelly Mitchell; 274 (2.66%)		Bonnie Mitchelson
Rossmere	Erna Braun; 5,392 (56.37%)	Kaur Sidhu; 3,430 (35.86%)	Rene Belliveau; 356 (3.72%)	Evan Maydaniuk; 351 (3.67%)		Erna Braun
St. Boniface	**Greg Selinger**; 5,914 (68.56%)	Frank Clark; 1,537 (17.82%)	Brad Gross; 606 (7.02%)	Alain Landry; 530 (6.14%)		**Greg Selinger**
Transcona	Daryl Reid; 4,488 (57.92%)	Craig Stapon; 2,668 (34.43%)	Faye McLeod-Jashyn; 551 (7.11%)			Daryl Reid

==== West Winnipeg ====
Electoral district	Candidates					Incumbent
Electoral district	NDP	PC	Liberal	Green	Other	Incumbent
Assiniboia	Jim Rondeau; 5,093 (58.22%)	Susan Auch; 3,258 (37.24%)	Moe Bokhari; 194 (2.22%)	Anlina Sheng; 203 (2.32%)		**Jim Rondeau**
Charleswood	Paul Beckta; 2,597 (30.05%)	Myrna Driedger; 4,826 (55.84%)	Matthew Ostrove; 751 (8.69%)	Dirk Hoeppner; 469 (5.83%)		Myrna Driedger
Kirkfield Park	Sharon Blady; 4,900 (46.80%)	Kelly de Groot; 4,871 (46.52%)	Syed Bokhari; 363 (3.47%)	Alanna Gray; 337 (3.22%)		Sharon Blady
St. James	Deanne Crothers; 4,411 (49.75%)	Scott Gillingham; 3,403 (38.38%)	Gerard Allard; 679 (7.66%)	Trevor Vandale; 374 (4.22%)		Bonnie Korzeniowski
Tuxedo	Dashi Zargani; 2,319 (25.35%)	Heather Stefanson; 4,829 (52.79%)	Linda Minuk; 1,509 (16.5%)	Donald Benham; 491 (5.36%)		Heather Stefanson

==== Central Winnipeg ====
Electoral district	Candidates					Incumbent
Electoral district	NDP	PC	Liberal	Green	Other	Incumbent
Fort Garry-Riverview	James Allum; 5,137 (55.52%)	Ian Rabb; 3,054 (33.01%)	Kevin Freedman; 663 (7.17%)	Daniel Backé; 398 (4.30%)		New District
Fort Rouge	**Jennifer Howard**; 4,493 (51.27%)	Sonny Dominique; 1,767 (20.16%)	Paul Hesse; 2,026 (23.12%)	Stephen Weedon; 477 (5.44%)		**Jennifer Howard**
Logan	**Flor Marcelino**; 2,943 (58.91%)	Tyrone Krawetz; 838 (16.77%)	Joe Chan; 845 (16.91%)	Kristen Andrews; 324 (6.49%)	David Tymoshchuk (CPC-M); 46 (0.92%)	New District
Minto	**Andrew Swan**; 3,569 (66.26%)	Belinda Squance; 830 (15.41%)	Don Woodstock; 602 (11.18%)	Harold Dyck; 330 (6.13%)	Cheryl-Anne Carr (CPC-M); 55 (1.02%)	**Andrew Swan**
River Heights	Dan Manning; 1,835 (17.76%)	Marty Morantz; 3,384 (32.76%)	Jon Gerrard; 4,742 (45.91%)	Elizabeth May Cameron; 369 (3.57%)		Jon Gerrard
Wolseley	Rob Altemeyer; 4,193 (60.68%)	Harpreet Turka; 847 (12.26%)	Eric Stewart; 506 (7.32%)	James Beddome; 1,364 (19.74%)		Rob Altemeyer

==== South Winnipeg ====
Electoral district	Candidates					Incumbent
Electoral district	NDP	PC	Liberal	Green	Other	Incumbent
Fort Richmond	**Kerri Irvin-Ross**; 4,026 (53.15%)	Shaun McCaffrey; 2,908 (38.39%)	Dustin Hiles; 369 (4.87%)	Caitlin McIntyre; 226 (2.98%)		New District
Fort Whyte	Sunny Dhaliwal; 2,655 (29.49%)	Hugh McFadyen; 5,594 (62.13%)	Chae Tsai; 710 (7.88%)			Hugh McFadyen
Riel	**Christine Melnick**; 5,352 (54.69%)	Rochelle Squires; 3,916 (40.01%)	Cheryl Gilarski; 480 (4.90%)			**Christine Melnick**
Seine River	**Theresa Oswald**; 5,500 (52.88%)	Gord Steeves; 4,569 (43.93%)	Troy Osiname; 295 (2.83%)			**Theresa Oswald**
Southdale	**Erin Selby**; 5,662 (51.84%)	Judy Eastman; 4,898 (44.84%)	Amarjit Singh; 327 (2.99%)			**Erin Selby**
St. Norbert	Dave Gaudreau; 3,966 (44.94%)	Karen Velthuys; 3,935 (44.58%)	Marcel Laurendeau; 883 (10.00%)			Marilyn Brick
St. Vital	**Nancy Allan**; 5,023 (59.80%)	Mike Brown; 2,876 (34.24%)	Harry Wolbert; 461 (5.48%)			**Nancy Allan**

=== Synopsis of results ===
2011 Manitoba general election – synopsis of riding results
Electoral division	Winning party							Votes						
Electoral division	2007	1st place	Votes	Share	Margin #	Margin %	2nd place	NDP	PC	Lib	Grn	Ind	Comm	Total
Agassiz	New	PC	4,396	71.05%	3,332	53.85%	NDP	1,064	4,396	411	316	–	–	6,187
Arthur-Virden	PC	PC	4,983	65.97%	2,701	35.76%	NDP	2,282	4,983	288	–	–	–	7,553
Assiniboia	NDP	NDP	5,095	58.22%	1,837	20.99%	PC	5,095	3,258	194	204	–	–	8,751
Brandon East	NDP	NDP	3,864	54.95%	1,153	16.40%	PC	3,864	2,711	280	177	–	–	7,032
Brandon West	PC	PC	4,231	48.68%	151	1.74%	NDP	4,080	4,231	381	–	–	–	8,692
Burrows	NDP	NDP	3,063	59.34%	1,749	33.88%	PC	3,063	1,314	629	124	–	32	5,162
Charleswood	PC	PC	4,838	55.83%	2,237	25.81%	NDP	2,601	4,838	755	472	–	–	8,666
Concordia	NDP	NDP	4,008	63.06%	2,205	34.69%	PC	4,008	1,803	237	308	–	–	6,356
Dauphin	New	NDP	4,483	54.93%	1,127	13.81%	PC	4,483	3,356	124	199	–	–	8,162
Dawson Trail	New	NDP	4,291	52.55%	737	9.03%	PC	4,291	3,554	321	–	–	–	8,166
Elmwood	NDP	NDP	3,864	54.61%	1,465	20.70%	PC	3,864 (Note: Jim Maloway had previously been MLA for Elmwood between 1986 and 2008.)	2,399	467	346	–	–	7,076
Emerson	PC	PC	3,982	72.65%	2,898	52.87%	NDP	1,084	3,982	415	–	–	–	5,481
Flin Flon	NDP	NDP	1,890	57.13%	1,093	33.04%	PC	1,890	797	510	111	–	–	3,308
Fort Garry-Riverview	NDP	NDP	5,146	55.55%	2,094	22.61%	PC	5,146	3,052	666	399	–	–	9,263
Fort Richmond	NDP	NDP	4,026	53.47%	1,118	14.85%	PC	4,026	2,908	369	226	–	–	7,529
Fort Rouge	NDP	NDP	4,501	51.26%	2,470	28.13%	Lib	4,501	1,770	2,031	478	–	–	8,780
Fort Whyte	PC	PC	5,594	62.44%	2,939	32.81%	NDP	2,655	5,594	710	–	–	–	8,959
Gimli	NDP	NDP	5,012	51.52%	802	8.24%	PC	5,012	4,210	197	309	–	–	9,728
Interlake	NDP	NDP	3,374	50.46%	471	7.04%	PC	3,374	2,903	194	–	215	–	6,686
Kewatinook	NDP	NDP	2,043	57.15%	654	18.29%	PC	2,043	1,389	49	94	–	–	3,575
Kildonan	NDP	NDP	4,808	59.51%	1,928	23.86%	PC	4,808	2,880	391	–	–	–	8,079
Kirkfield Park	NDP	NDP	4,928	46.75%	21	0.20%	PC	4,928	4,907	367	339	–	–	10,541
La Vérendrye	NDP	PC	4,487	64.07%	2,657	37.94%	NDP	1,830	4,487	351	335	–	–	7,003
Lac du Bonnet	PC	PC	4,350	54.30%	1,263	15.77%	NDP	3,087	4,350	284	290	–	–	8,011
Lakeside	PC	PC	5,043	65.80%	3,058	39.90%	NDP	1,985	5,043	257	379	–	–	7,664
Logan	NDP	NDP	2,985	58.75%	2,117	41.67%	Lib	2,985	840	868	335	–	53	5,081
Midland	New	PC	5,139	69.45%	3,389	45.80%	NDP	1,750	5,139	511	–	–	–	7,400
Minto	NDP	NDP	3,615	66.40%	2,782	51.10%	PC	3,615	833	609	331	–	56	5,444
Morden-Winkler	New	PC	4,918	85.53%	4,259	74.07%	NDP	659	4,918	173	–	–	–	5,750
Morris	PC	PC	5,681	74.00%	4,194	54.63%	NDP	1,487	5,681	509	–	–	–	7,677
Point Douglas	NDP	NDP	3,806	73.28%	2,889	55.62%	PC	3,806	917	257	176	–	38	5,194
Portage la Prairie	PC	PC	3,584	52.24%	886	12.91%	NDP	2,698	3,584	579	–	–	–	6,861
Radisson	NDP	NDP	5,033	55.14%	1,445	15.83%	PC	5,033	3,588	506	–	–	–	9,127
Riding Mountain	New	PC	4,465	58.47%	1,832	23.99%	NDP	2,633	4,465	272	267	–	–	7,637
Riel	NDP	NDP	5,352	54.90%	1,436	14.73%	PC	5,352	3,916	480	–	–	–	9,748
River East	PC	PC	5,247	51.34%	735	7.19%	NDP	4,512	5,247	188	274	–	–	10,221
River Heights	Lib	Lib	4,756	45.92%	1,367	13.20%	PC	1,843	3,389	4,756	370	–	–	10,358
Rossmere	NDP	NDP	5,392	56.59%	1,962	20.59%	PC	5,392	3,430	356	351	–	–	9,529
Seine River	NDP	NDP	5,500	53.07%	931	8.98%	PC	5,500	4,569	295	–	–	–	10,364
Selkirk	NDP	NDP	4,279	56.02%	1,271	16.64%	PC	4,279	3,008	351	–	–	–	7,638
Southdale	NDP	NDP	5,662	52.01%	764	7.02%	PC	5,662	4,898	327	–	–	–	10,887
Spruce Woods	PC	PC	4,495	66.65%	2,565	38.03%	NDP	1,930	4,495	319	–	–	–	6,744
St. Boniface	NDP	NDP	5,914	68.87%	4,377	50.97%	PC	5,914	1,537	606	530	–	–	8,587
St. James	NDP	NDP	4,432	49.75%	1,018	11.43%	PC	4,432	3,414	685	377	–	–	8,908
St. Johns	NDP	NDP	4,157	65.96%	2,752	43.67%	PC	4,157	1,405	348	392	–	–	6,302
St. Norbert	NDP	NDP	3,966	45.15%	31	0.35%	PC	3,966	3,935	883	–	–	–	8,784
St. Paul	PC	PC	5,554	59.59%	2,063	22.13%	NDP	3,491	5,554	276	–	–	–	9,321
St. Vital	NDP	NDP	5,023	60.08%	2,147	25.68%	PC	5,023	2,876	461	–	–	–	8,360
Steinbach	PC	PC	5,469	85.49%	4,981	77.86%	NDP	488	5,469	440	–	–	–	6,397
Swan River	NDP	NDP	4,280	56.15%	1,202	15.77%	PC	4,280	3,078	264	–	–	–	7,622
The Maples	NDP	NDP	3,894	51.83%	1,951	25.97%	PC	3,894	1,943	1,395	281	–	–	7,513
The Pas	NDP	NDP	2,995	73.61%	2,036	50.04%	PC	2,995	959	115	–	–	–	4,069
Thompson	NDP	NDP	2,586	68.52%	1,518	40.22%	PC	2,586	1,068	120	–	–	–	3,774
Transcona	NDP	NDP	4,488	58.23%	1,820	23.61%	PC	4,488	2,668	551	–	–	–	7,707
Tuxedo	PC	PC	4,839	52.74%	2,509	27.34%	NDP	2,330	4,839	1,516	491	–	–	9,176
Tyndall Park	Lib	NDP	2,596	45.16%	589	10.25%	Lib	2,596	908	2,007	237	–	–	5,748
Wolseley	NDP	NDP	4,229	60.73%	2,861	41.08%	Green	4,229	850	517	1,368	–	–	6,964

= open seat
= winning candidate was in previous Legislature
= incumbent had switched allegiance
= previously incumbent in another riding
= incumbency arose from a byelection gain
= not incumbent; was previously elected to the Legislature
= other incumbents renominated
= previously an MP in the House of Commons of Canada
= multiple candidates

=== Turnout, winning shares and swings ===
Summary of riding results by turnout, vote share for winning candidate, and swing (vs 2007)
Riding and winning party			Turnout		Vote share (Note: Share won by winning candidate, with difference noted from share achieved by the same party in 2007.)		Swing (Note: Positive indicates improvement to standing of party winning in 2007; negative points to 2007's second-place party being swung to.)	
Riding and winning party			%	Change (pp)	%	Change (pp)	To	Change (pp)
Agassiz	PC		46.01		71.05			
Arthur-Virden	PC	Hold	51.91	-4.89	65.97	1.92	PC	1.26
Assiniboia	NDP	Hold	62.00	0.15	58.22	-3.99	PC	-4.47
Brandon East	NDP	Hold	53.12	-5.60	54.95	1.00	NDP	0.27
Brandon West	PC	Hold	59.79	-7.02	48.68	0.63	PC	0.58
Burrows	NDP	Hold	47.08	-3.03	59.34	-11.41	PC	-9.05
Charleswood	PC	Hold	61.09	1.66	55.83	1.21	PC	1.51
Concordia	NDP	Hold	49.79	2.37	63.06	-5.99	PC	-6.37
Dauphin	NDP		62.09		54.93			
Dawson Trail	NDP		58.18		52.55			
Elmwood	NDP	Hold	52.56	2.58	54.61	-6.90	PC	-9.90
Emerson	PC	Hold	44.42	-5.09	72.65	12.54	PC	7.09
Flin Flon	NDP	Hold	35.34	-0.91	57.13	-20.46	Lib	-6.74
Fort Garry-Riverview	NDP	Hold	65.06	9.49	55.55	-2.57	PC	-8.93
Fort Richmond	NDP	Hold	62.91	-3.15	53.47	0.87	PC	-6.00
Fort Rouge	NDP	Hold	61.22	-1.07	51.26	4.29	NDP	5.85
Fort Whyte	PC	Hold	61.91	2.76	62.44	10.49	PC	7.34
Gimli	NDP	Hold	65.98	3.07	51.52	-7.22	PC	-8.21
Interlake	NDP	Hold	53.36	-3.17	50.46	-9.04	PC	-8.26
Kewatinook	NDP	Hold	35.68	2.18	57.15	-1.31	PC	-2.13
Kildonan	NDP	Hold	54.97	-3.60	59.51	-2.12	PC	-4.37
Kirkfield Park	NDP	Hold	68.97	-0.24	46.75	-2.57	PC	-5.50
La Verendrye	PC	Gain	53.61	-6.45	64.07	26.25	PC	-25.62
Lac du Bonnet	PC	Hold	58.04	-0.48	54.30	-4.71	NDP	-4.81
Lakeside	PC	Hold	57.12	-0.52	65.80	9.61	PC	8.47
Logan	NDP	Hold	48.04	1.99	58.75	4.79	NDP	2.31
Midland	PC		51.35		69.45			
Minto	NDP	Hold	46.43	-4.00	66.40	2.78	NDP	6.78
Morden-Winkler	PC		40.78		85.53			
Morris	PC	Hold	50.69	-3.44	74.00	17.02	PC	15.11
Point Douglas	NDP	Hold	44.04	3.90	73.28	6.92	NDP	8.34
Portage la Prairie	PC	Hold	50.99	-6.23	52.24	3.93	PC	3.50
Radisson	NDP	Hold	61.48	1.24	55.14	-1.58	PC	-2.81
Riding Mountain	PC		54.01		58.47			
Riel	NDP	Hold	64.14	1.10	54.90	-2.42	PC	-5.95
River East	PC	Hold	67.00	-0.57	51.34	4.49	PC	3.32
River Heights	Liberal	Hold	72.51	3.16	45.92	-5.15	PC	-6.38
Rossmere	NDP	Hold	60.07	-1.63	56.59	-4.12	PC	-3.69
Seine River	NDP	Hold	70.82	7.56	53.07	-3.81	PC	-7.85
Selkirk	NDP	Hold	54.77	-4.41	56.02	0.38	PC	-1.59
Southdale	NDP	Hold	70.13	4.39	52.01	0.96	PC	-2.15
Spruce Woods	PC	Hold	48.64	-5.75	66.65	0.56	NDP	-2.73
St. Boniface	NDP	Hold	59.50	-0.06	68.87	2.83	NDP	4.69
St. James	NDP	Hold	62.02	2.89	49.75	-6.13	PC	-6.75
St. Johns	NDP	Hold	48.34	-3.11	65.96	-2.86	PC	-4.28
St. Norbert	NDP	Hold	64.25	-1.22	45.15	-8.59	PC	-10.72
St. Paul	PC	Hold	58.28	1.50	59.59	1.13	NDP	-3.13
St. Vital	NDP	Hold	60.35	1.89	60.08	-1.46	PC	-6.23
Steinbach	PC	Hold	49.66	-0.32	85.49	2.51	PC	1.77
Swan River	NDP	Hold	59.66	-5.56	56.15	-2.25	PC	-2.49
The Maples	NDP	Hold	54.91	-0.14	51.83	-4.33	PC	-0.39
The Pas	NDP	Hold	30.40	-6.23	73.61	4.74	NDP	1.31
Thompson	NDP	Hold	36.72	-3.10	68.52	-5.38	NDP	3.70
Transcona	NDP	Hold	51.24	2.44	58.23	-10.50	PC	-11.48
Tuxedo	PC	Hold	62.31	1.78	52.74	5.48	PC	5.41
Tyndall Park	NDP	Gain	51.50	-9.95	45.16	10.81	NDP	-16.81
Wolseley	NDP	Hold	55.60	0.32	60.73	-3.16	Green	-5.36

=== Changes in party shares ===
Share change analysis by party and riding (2011 vs 2007)
Riding	Green		Liberal		NDP		PC	
Riding	%	Change (pp)	%	Change (pp)	%	Change (pp)	%	Change (pp)
Agassiz	5.11	New	6.64	New	17.20	New	71.05	New
Arthur-Virden			3.81	-1.32	30.21	-0.60	65.97	1.92
Assiniboia	2.33	2.33	2.22	-3.30	58.22	-3.99	37.23	4.95
Brandon East	2.52	2.52	3.98	-3.97	54.95	1.00	38.55	0.46
Brandon West			4.38	0.34	46.94	-0.54	48.68	0.63
Burrows	2.40	2.40	12.19	1.69	59.34	-11.41	25.46	6.69
Charleswood	5.45	5.45	8.71	-4.86	30.01	-1.80	55.83	1.21
Concordia	4.85	1.52	3.73	-2.28	63.06	-5.99	28.37	6.75
Dauphin	2.44	New	1.52	New	54.93	New	41.12	New
Dawson Trail	–	New	3.93	New	52.55	New	43.52	New
Elmwood	4.89	4.89	6.60	-10.88	54.61	-6.90	33.90	12.89
Emerson			7.57	-10.89	19.78	-1.65	72.65	12.54
Flin Flon	3.36	3.36	15.42	-6.98	57.13	-20.46	24.09	24.09
Fort Garry-Riverview	4.31	-4.16	7.19	-8.56	55.55	-2.57	32.95	15.29
Fort Richmond	3.00	-0.26	4.90	-13.49	53.47	0.87	38.62	12.87
Fort Rouge	5.44	-0.83	23.13	-7.40	51.26	4.29	20.16	5.41
Fort Whyte			7.92	-6.29	29.64	-4.20	62.44	10.49
Gimli	3.18	3.18	2.03	-5.16	51.52	-7.22	43.28	9.20
Interlake			2.90	-1.64	50.46	-9.04	43.42	7.47
Kewatinook	2.63	2.63	1.37	-4.27	57.15	-1.31	38.85	2.95
Kildonan	–	-2.51	4.84	-2.00	59.51	-2.12	35.65	6.63
Kirkfield Park	3.22	3.22	3.48	-9.08	46.75	-2.57	46.55	8.43
La Verendrye	4.78	4.78	5.01	-1.22	26.13	-24.99	64.07	26.25
Lac du Bonnet	3.62	3.62	3.55	-3.82	38.53	4.91	54.30	-4.71
Lakeside	4.95	0.54	3.35	-2.81	25.90	-7.34	65.80	9.61
Logan	6.59	6.59	17.08	0.17	58.75	4.79	16.53	3.41
Midland	–	New	6.91	New	23.65	New	69.45	New
Minto	6.08	6.08	11.19	-10.77	66.40	2.78	15.30	2.82
Morden-Winkler	–	New	3.01	New	11.46	New	85.53	New
Morris			6.63	-3.82	19.37	-13.20	74.00	17.02
Point Douglas	3.39	-1.92	4.95	-9.77	73.28	6.92	17.65	5.68
Portage la Prairie			8.44	-0.85	39.32	-3.08	52.24	3.93
Radisson			5.54	-2.45	55.14	-1.58	39.31	4.03
Riding Mountain	3.50	New	3.56	New	34.48	New	58.47	New
Riel			4.92	-7.07	54.90	-2.42	40.17	9.49
River East	2.68	2.68	1.84	-5.02	44.14	-2.14	51.34	4.49
River Heights	3.57	-0.48	45.92	-5.15	17.79	-1.98	32.72	7.61
Rossmere	3.68	3.68	3.74	-2.82	56.59	-4.12	36.00	3.26
Seine River			2.85	-8.08	53.07	-3.81	44.09	11.89
Selkirk			4.60	-3.95	56.02	0.38	39.38	3.56
Southdale			3.00	-6.21	52.01	0.96	44.99	5.25
Spruce Woods			4.73	-6.58	28.62	6.03	66.65	0.56
St. Boniface	6.17	-0.70	7.06	-6.55	68.87	2.83	17.90	5.01
St. James	4.23	-0.26	7.69	-0.97	49.75	-6.13	38.33	7.36
St. Johns	6.22	1.48	5.52	-4.32	65.96	-2.86	22.29	5.70
St. Norbert			10.05	-4.26	45.15	-8.59	44.80	12.85
St. Paul			2.96	-8.52	37.45	7.39	59.59	1.13
St. Vital	–	-4.68	5.51	-4.84	60.08	-1.46	34.40	10.99
Steinbach	–	-3.62	6.88	2.14	7.63	-1.03	85.49	2.51
Swan River			3.46	-0.49	56.15	-2.25	40.38	2.74
The Maples	3.74	3.74	18.57	4.16	51.83	-4.33	25.86	-3.56
The Pas			2.83	-6.86	73.61	4.74	23.57	2.12
Thompson			3.18	-12.79	68.52	-5.38	28.30	18.17
Transcona			7.15	-1.96	58.23	-10.50	34.62	12.46
Tuxedo	5.35	5.35	16.52	-5.48	25.39	-5.35	52.74	5.48
Tyndall Park	4.12	4.12	34.92	-22.81	45.16	10.81	15.80	7.88
Wolseley	19.64	7.57	7.42	-4.01	60.73	-3.16	12.21	0.89

= did not field a candidate in 2007

== By-elections since 2011 ==
Manitoba provincial by-election, April 22, 2015: The Pas
Party	Candidate	Votes	%	±%	Expenditures
New Democratic	Amanda Lathlin	1,557	56.47	-16.74	
Progressive Conservative	Jacob Nasekapow	817	29.63	+6.18	
Liberal	Inez Vystrcil-Spence	369	13.38	+10.56	
Total valid votes		2,743	100.00		
Rejected and declined votes		14			
Turnout		2,757	22.10		
Electors on the lists		12,475			
New Democratic hold		Swing			

Manitoba provincial by-election, January 28, 2014: Arthur-Virden
Party	Candidate	Votes	%	±%	Expenditures
Progressive Conservative	Doyle Piwniuk	3,137	68.20	+2.23	
Liberal	Floyd Buhler	738	16.04	+12.23	
New Democratic	Bob Senff	480	10.43	-19.78	
Green	Kate Storey	245	5.33		
Total valid votes		4,600	100.00		
Rejected and declined votes		10			
Turnout		4,610	33.55		
Electors on the lists		13,739			
Progressive Conservative hold		Swing		-5.00	

Manitoba provincial by-election, January 28, 2014: Morris
Party	Candidate	Votes	%	±%	Expenditures
Progressive Conservative	Shannon Martin	2,642	69.99	-4.01	
New Democratic	Dean Harder	488	12.93	-6.44	
Liberal	Jeremy Barber	422	11.18	+4.55	
Independent	Ray Shaw	138	3.66	-	
Green	Alain Landry	85	2.25	-	
Total valid votes		3,775			
Rejected and declined votes		17			
Turnout		3,792	27.51		
Electors on the lists		13,782			
Progressive Conservative hold		Swing		+1.21	

Manitoba provincial by-election, September 4, 2012 Resignation of Hugh McFadyen: Fort Whyte
Party	Candidate	Votes	%	±%
Progressive Conservative	Brian Pallister	3,626	55.14	-6.99
Liberal	Bob Axworthy	2,069	31.47	+23.59
New Democratic	Bonny Schmidt	739	11.24	-18.25
Green	Donnie H.J Benham	113	1.73	+1.73
Independent	Darrell Ackman	19	0.03	+0.03
Spoiled/rejected votes		10		
turnout		41.64		
Total valid votes		6,576	100.00	
