= 25th Manitoba Legislature =

The members of the 25th Manitoba Legislature were elected in the Manitoba general election held in June 1958. The legislature sat from October 23, 1958, to March 31, 1959.

The Progressive Conservative Party led by Duff Roblin formed a minority government.

Douglas Lloyd Campbell of the Liberal-Progressive Party was Leader of the Opposition.

Abram Harrison served as speaker for the assembly.

In March 1959, Roblin decided to consider a defeat on a procedural motion as a vote of no confidence and called for a new election.

There were two sessions of the 25th Legislature:

Session	Start	End
1st	October 23, 1958	November 7, 1958
2nd	March 12, 1959	March 31, 1959

John Stewart McDiarmid was Lieutenant Governor of Manitoba.

== Members of the Assembly ==
The following members were elected to the assembly in 1958:

Member	Electoral district	Party	First elected / previously elected	No.# of term(s)
John Cobb	Arthur	Progressive Conservative	1958	1st term
Donovan Swailes	Assiniboia	CCF	1945	4th term
Rodney Clement	Birtle-Russell	Liberal-Progressive	1949	3rd term
Reginald Lissaman	Brandon	Progressive Conservative	1952	3rd term
Edward Schreyer	Brokenhead	CCF	1958	1st term
John Hawryluk	Burrows	CCF	1958	1st term
Edmond Prefontaine	Carillon	Liberal-Progressive	1935	7th term
Edward Joseph Williams	Churchill	Progressive Conservative	1958	1st term
Marcel Boulic	Cypress	Progressive Conservative	1958	1st term
Stewart McLean	Dauphin	Progressive Conservative	1958	1st term
Walter McDonald	Dufferin	Liberal-Progressive	1949	3rd term
Steve Peters	Elmwood	CCF	1958	1st term
John Tanchak	Emerson	Liberal-Progressive	1957	2nd term
Michael Hryhorczuk	Ethelbert Plains	Liberal-Progressive	1949	3rd term
Peter Wagner	Fisher	CCF	1958	1st term
Francis Jobin	Flin Flon	Liberal-Progressive	1949	3rd term
Sterling Lyon	Fort Garry	Progressive Conservative	1958	1st term
Gurney Evans	Fort Rouge	Progressive Conservative	1953	2nd term
George Johnson	Gimli	Progressive Conservative	1958	1st term
Nelson Shoemaker	Gladstone	Liberal-Progressive	1958	1st term
Barry Strickland	Hamiota	Progressive Conservative	1958	1st term
Morris Gray	Inkster	CCF	1941	5th term
Anthony J. Reid	Kildonan	CCF	1958	1st term
Arthur A. Trapp	Lac du Bonnet	Liberal-Progressive	1958	1st term
Douglas Lloyd Campbell	Lakeside	Liberal-Progressive	1922	9th term
Stan Roberts	La Verendrye	Liberal-Progressive	1958	1st term
Stephen Juba	Logan	Independent	1953	2nd term
Charles Shuttleworth	Minnedosa	Liberal-Progressive	1949	3rd term
Harold Shewman	Morris	Progressive Conservative	1949	3rd term
Lloyd Stinson	Osborne	CCF	1945	4th term
Maurice Ridley	Pembina	Progressive Conservative	1957	2nd term
Charles Greenlay	Portage la Prairie	Liberal-Progressive	1943	5th term
Russell Paulley	Radisson	CCF	1953	2nd term
Wallace C. Miller	Rhineland	Liberal-Progressive	1936	6th term
William B. Scarth	River Heights	Progressive Conservative	1958	1st term
Keith Alexander	Roblin	Progressive Conservative	1958	1st term
Abram Harrison	Rock Lake	Progressive Conservative	1943	5th term
Robert Bend	Rockwood—Iberville	Liberal-Progressive	1949	3rd term
Joseph Jeannotte	Rupertsland	Progressive Conservative	1958	1st term
Roger Teillet	St. Boniface	Liberal-Progressive	1953	2nd term
Elman Guttormson	St. George	Liberal-Progressive	1956	2nd term
Douglas Stanes	St. James	Progressive Conservative	1958	1st term
David Orlikow	St. Johns	CCF	1958	1st term
William G. Martin	St. Matthews	Progressive Conservative	1958	1st term
Fred Groves	St. Vital	Progressive Conservative	1958	1st term
Gildas Molgat	Ste. Rose	Liberal-Progressive	1953	2nd term
Thomas P. Hillhouse	Selkirk	Liberal-Progressive	1950	3rd term
Arthur E. Wright	Seven Oaks	CCF	1958	1st term
Malcolm Earl McKellar	Souris-Lansdowne	Progressive Conservative	1958	1st term
William Lucko	Springfield	Liberal-Progressive	1949	3rd term
Albert H. C. Corbett	Swan River	Progressive Conservative	1958	1st term
John Carroll	The Pas	Progressive Conservative	1958	1st term
Errick Willis	Turtle Mountain	Progressive Conservative	1936	6th term
John Thompson	Virden	Progressive Conservative	1953	2nd term
Richard Seaborn	Wellington	Progressive Conservative	1958	1st term
James Cowan	Winnipeg Centre	Progressive Conservative	1958	1st term
Dufferin Roblin	Wolseley	Progressive Conservative	1949	3rd term

== By-elections ==
None.
