= Independent candidates in the 1988 Manitoba provincial election =

Eleven people ran as independent candidates in the 1988 Manitoba general election, none of whom was elected. Information about these candidates may be found on this page.

== Michael Ambrose Kibzey (Burrows) ==
Kibzey received 129 votes (1.75%), finishing fourth against Liberal candidate William Chornopyski. He died in 1997, at age 76.

== Bill Seman (Concordia) ==
Seman received 358 votes (3.65%), finishing fourth against New Democratic Party leader and later Premier Gary Doer.
