= Burrows (electoral district) =

Provincial electoral district in Manitoba, Canada

Coordinates: 49.93°N 97.17°W

Manitoba electoral district

Provincial electoral district
- Legislature: Legislative Assembly of Manitoba
MLA
Diljeet Brar
New Democratic
- District created: 1957
- First contested: 1958
- Last contested: 2023

Demographics
- Population (2016): 23,755
- Electors (2019): 14,124
- Area (km²): 10
- Pop. density (per km²): 2,375.5

Burrows is a provincial electoral district of Manitoba, Canada. It was created by redistribution in 1957 from part of Winnipeg North, and formally came into existence in the provincial election of 1958. The riding is located in the northern part of Winnipeg.

Burrows is named after Theodore Arthur Burrows, who served as Lieutenant-Governor of Manitoba from 1926 to 1929. It is bordered to the east by St. Johns and Point Douglas, to the south by Wellington, to the north by Kildonan and The Maples, and to the west by Tyndall Park. The riding's boundaries were significantly redrawn in 1999, taking in a considerable amount of territory which was previously a part of the now-defunct Inkster.

The riding's population in 1996 was 18,718. In 1999, the average family income was $35,575, one of the lowest rates in the province. Thirty-nine per cent of the riding's residents are listed as low-income, with an unemployment rate of 13%. One household in four has only one parent. Nineteen per cent of the riding's residents are over sixty-five years of age.

The total immigrant population in Burrows is 21%, with almost one in three residents speaking a first language other than English or French. The Aboriginal population is 15%.

Manufacturing accounts for 22% of Burrows' industry, with a further 15% in the service sector.

The CCF and its successor the NDP have won Burrows on all but three occasions since the riding was created, with the Liberals winning the other three elections.

== Members of the Legislative Assembly ==
Assembly	Years	Member		Party	
25th	1958–1961		John Hawryluk	CCF	
26th	1961–1962		John Hawryluk	NDP	
27th	1962–1966		Mark Smerchanski	Liberal	
28th	1966–1981		Ben Hanuschak	NDP	
29th	1966–1981		Ben Hanuschak	NDP	
30th	1966–1981		Ben Hanuschak	NDP	
31st	1966–1981		Ben Hanuschak		
31st	1966–1981	1981	Ben Hanuschak		Independent
31st	1981		Ben Hanuschak	Progressive	
	1981–1988	Conrad Santos	NDP		
	1988–1990	William Chornopyski	Liberal		
	1990–2011	Doug Martindale	NDP		
	2011–2016	Melanie Wight	NDP		
41st	2016–2019	Cindy Lamoureux	Liberal		
42nd	2019–present	Diljeet Brar	NDP		
43rd	2019–present	Diljeet Brar	NDP		

Name	Party	Took office	Left office
John Hawryluk	CCF	1958	1961
	NDP	1961	1962
Mark Smerchanski	Lib	1962	1966
Ben Hanuschak	NDP	1966	1981
	Independent	1981	1981
	Prog	1981	1981
Conrad Santos	NDP	1981	1988
William Chornopyski	Lib	1988	1990
Doug Martindale	NDP	1990	2011
Melanie Wight	NDP	2011	2016
Cindy Lamoureux	Lib	2016	2019
Diljeet Brar	NDP	2019	

== Election results ==
=== 1958 ===
1958 Manitoba general election
Party	Candidate	Votes	%
Co-operative Commonwealth	John Hawryluk	2,032	37.70
Labor–Progressive	Bill Kardash	1,207	22.39
Liberal–Progressive	Joseph R. Hnidan	1,084	20.11
Progressive Conservative	John Kereluk	1,067	19.80
Total valid votes		5,390	–
Rejected		86	–
Eligible voters / Turnout		11,075	49.44
Source(s) Source: Manitoba. Chief Electoral Officer (1999). Statement of Votes for the 37th Provincial General Election, September 21, 1999 (PDF) (Report). Winnipeg: Elections Manitoba.

=== 1959 ===
1959 Manitoba general election
Party	Candidate	Votes	%	±%
Co-operative Commonwealth	John Hawryluk	2,235	41.77	4.07
Progressive Conservative	Andrew Zaharychuk	1,286	24.03	4.24
Liberal–Progressive	Joseph R. Hnidan	1,155	21.58	1.47
Labor–Progressive	William Cecil Ross	675	12.61	-9.78
Total valid votes		5,351	–	–
Rejected		133	–	
Eligible voters / Turnout		10,683	51.33	1.89
Source(s) Source: Manitoba. Chief Electoral Officer (1999). Statement of Votes for the 37th Provincial General Election, September 21, 1999 (PDF) (Report). Winnipeg: Elections Manitoba.

=== 1962 ===
1962 Manitoba general election
Party	Candidate	Votes	%	±%
Liberal	Mark Smerchanski	1,791	39.30	17.72
New Democratic	John Hawryluk	1,502	32.96	-8.81
Progressive Conservative	Peter Okrainec	747	16.39	-7.64
Communist	Andrew Bileski [Bilecki]	517	11.35	–
Total valid votes		4,557	–	–
Rejected		113	–	
Eligible voters / Turnout		10,017	46.62	-4.71
Source(s) Source: Manitoba. Chief Electoral Officer (1999). Statement of Votes for the 37th Provincial General Election, September 21, 1999 (PDF) (Report). Winnipeg: Elections Manitoba.

=== 1966 ===
1966 Manitoba general election
Party	Candidate	Votes	%	±%
New Democratic	Ben Hanuschak	2,415	46.42	13.46
Liberal	Mark Smerchanski	1,487	28.58	-10.72
Progressive Conservative	Walter Paschak	1,301	25.00	8.61
Total valid votes		5,203	–	–
Rejected		93	–	
Eligible voters / Turnout		9,590	55.22	8.60
Source(s) Source: Manitoba. Chief Electoral Officer (1999). Statement of Votes for the 37th Provincial General Election, September 21, 1999 (PDF) (Report). Winnipeg: Elections Manitoba.

=== 1969 ===
1969 Manitoba general election
Party	Candidate	Votes	%	±%
New Democratic	Ben Hanuschak	3,418	58.84	12.42
Progressive Conservative	Wasyl Michael "Bill" Swystun	1,317	22.67	-2.33
Liberal	Olga E. Lewicki	751	12.93	-15.65
Communist	Andrew Bileski	323	5.56	–
Total valid votes		5,809	–	–
Rejected		80	–	
Eligible voters / Turnout		10,275	57.31	2.09
Source(s) Source: Manitoba. Chief Electoral Officer (1999). Statement of Votes for the 37th Provincial General Election, September 21, 1999 (PDF) (Report). Winnipeg: Elections Manitoba.

=== 1973 ===
1973 Manitoba general election
Party	Candidate	Votes	%	±%
New Democratic	Ben Hanuschak	5,277	73.26	14.42
Progressive Conservative	Doug Krochak	1,044	14.49	-8.18
Liberal	Bob Major	741	10.29	-2.64
Communist	Bill Kardash	108	1.50	-4.06
Marxist–Leninist	Glen Brown	33	0.46	–
Total valid votes		7,203	–	–
Rejected		59	–	
Eligible voters / Turnout		10,269	70.72	13.40
Source(s) Source: Manitoba. Chief Electoral Officer (1999). Statement of Votes for the 37th Provincial General Election, September 21, 1999 (PDF) (Report). Winnipeg: Elections Manitoba.

=== 1977 ===
1977 Manitoba general election
Party	Candidate	Votes	%	±%
New Democratic	Ben Hanuschak	4,103	65.32	-7.94
Progressive Conservative	Ken Alylula	1,688	26.87	12.38
Liberal	Anne Percheson	490	7.80	-2.49
Total valid votes		6,281	–	–
Rejected		30	–	
Eligible voters / Turnout		9,295	67.90	-2.82
Source(s) Source: Manitoba. Chief Electoral Officer (1999). Statement of Votes for the 37th Provincial General Election, September 21, 1999 (PDF) (Report). Winnipeg: Elections Manitoba.

=== 1981 ===
1981 Manitoba general election
Party	Candidate	Votes	%	±%
New Democratic	Conrad Santos	4,890	62.99	-2.33
Progressive Conservative	Mary Shore	1,384	17.83	-9.05
Progressive	Ben Hanuschak	728	9.38	–
Liberal	Wayne Anderson	617	7.95	0.15
Communist	Paula Fletcher	144	1.85	–
Total valid votes		7,763	–	–
Rejected		71	–	
Eligible voters / Turnout		11,584	67.63	-0.27
Source(s) Source: Manitoba. Chief Electoral Officer (1999). Statement of Votes for the 37th Provincial General Election, September 21, 1999 (PDF) (Report). Winnipeg: Elections Manitoba.

=== 1986 ===
1986 Manitoba general election
Party	Candidate	Votes	%	±%
New Democratic	Conrad Santos	3,547	53.04	-9.96
Independent	William Chornopyski	1,437	21.49	–
Progressive Conservative	Nick Trusewych	950	14.20	-3.62
Liberal	Rory MacLeod	587	8.78	0.83
Communist	Paula Fletcher	131	1.96	0.10
Independent	Ted DuRussel	36	0.54	–
Total valid votes		6,688	–	–
Rejected		27	–	
Eligible voters / Turnout		10,902	61.59	-6.03
Source(s) Source: Manitoba. Chief Electoral Officer (1999). Statement of Votes for the 37th Provincial General Election, September 21, 1999 (PDF) (Report). Winnipeg: Elections Manitoba.

=== 1988 ===
1988 Manitoba general election
Party	Candidate	Votes	%	±%
Liberal	William Chornopyski	3,114	42.27	33.49
New Democratic	Doug Martindale	3,005	40.79	-12.25
Progressive Conservative	Allan Yap	1,040	14.12	-0.09
Independent	Michael Kibzey	129	1.75	–
Communist	Lorne Robson	79	1.07	-0.89
Total valid votes		7,367	–	–
Rejected		45	–	
Eligible voters / turnout		11,222	66.05	4.45
Liberal gain from New Democratic		Swing		+16.52
Source(s) Source: Manitoba. Chief Electoral Officer (1999). Statement of Votes for the 37th Provincial General Election, September 21, 1999 (PDF) (Report). Winnipeg: Elections Manitoba.

=== 1990 ===
1990 Manitoba general election
Party	Candidate	Votes	%	±%
New Democratic	Doug Martindale	4,206	54.34	13.55
Liberal	William Chornopyski	2,056	26.56	-15.71
Progressive Conservative	Chris Aune	1,478	19.10	4.98
Total valid votes		7,740	–	–
Rejected		29	–	
Eligible voters / turnout		11,619	66.86	0.82
Source(s) Source: Manitoba. Chief Electoral Officer (1999). Statement of Votes for the 37th Provincial General Election, September 21, 1999 (PDF) (Report). Winnipeg: Elections Manitoba.

=== 1995 ===
1995 Manitoba general election
Party	Candidate	Votes	%	±%	Expenditures
New Democratic	Doug Martindale	4,748	67.46	13.12	$18,404.00
Progressive Conservative	Bill McGee	1,266	17.99	-1.11	$13,414.34
Liberal	Naty Yankech	1,024	14.55	-12.01	$13,401.87
Total valid votes		7,038	–	–	
Rejected		58	–		
Eligible voters / turnout		11,104	63.90	-2.96	
Source(s) Source: Manitoba. Chief Electoral Officer (1999). Statement of Votes for the 37th Provincial General Election, September 21, 1999 (PDF) (Report). Winnipeg: Elections Manitoba.

=== 1999 ===
1999 Manitoba general election
Party	Candidate	Votes	%	±%	Expenditures
New Democratic	Doug Martindale	5,151	66.34	-1.13	$21,056.00
Liberal	Mike Babinsky	1,849	23.81	9.26	$24,553.70
Progressive Conservative	Cheryl Clark	724	9.32	-8.66	$11,879.28
Communist	Darrell Rankin	41	0.53	–	$0.00
Total valid votes		7,765	–	–	
Rejected		55	–		
Eligible voters / turnout		11,914	65.64	1.73	
Source(s) Source: Manitoba. Chief Electoral Officer (1999). Statement of Votes for the 37th Provincial General Election, September 21, 1999 (PDF) (Report). Winnipeg: Elections Manitoba.

=== 2003 ===
2003 Manitoba general election
Party	Candidate	Votes	%	±%	Expenditures
New Democratic	Doug Martindale	4,004	69.01	2.67	$14,056.29
Liberal	Tony Sanchez	1,252	21.58	-2.23	$17,240.92
Progressive Conservative	Derek Lambert	423	7.29	-2.03	$0.00
Green	Catharine Johannson	123	2.12	–	$200.80
Total valid votes		5,802	–	–	
Rejected		31	–		
Eligible voters / turnout		11,636	50.13	-15.51	
Source(s) Source: Manitoba. Chief Electoral Officer (2003). Statement of Votes for the 38th Provincial General Election, June 3, 2003 (PDF) (Report). Winnipeg: Elections Manitoba.

=== 2007 ===
2007 Manitoba general election
Party	Candidate	Votes	%	±%	Expenditures
New Democratic	Doug Martindale	3,790	70.75	1.74	$16,207.51
Progressive Conservative	Rick Negrych	1,005	18.76	11.47	$13,322.81
Liberal	Bernd Hohne	562	10.49	-11.09	$3,416.97
Total valid votes		5,357	–	–	
Rejected		29	–		
Eligible voters / turnout		10,747	50.12	-0.01	
Source(s) Source: Manitoba. Chief Electoral Officer (2007). Statement of Votes for the 39th Provincial General Election, May 22, 2007 (PDF) (Report). Winnipeg: Elections Manitoba.

=== 2011 ===
2011 Manitoba general election
Party	Candidate	Votes	%	±%	Expenditures
New Democratic	Melanie Wight	3,063	59.34	-11.41	$17,078.77
Progressive Conservative	Rick Negrych	1,314	25.46	6.69	$8,890.74
Liberal	Twyla Motkaluk	629	12.19	1.69	$30,549.49
Green	Garett Peepeetch	124	2.40	–	$23.08
Communist	Frank Komarniski	32	0.62	–	$312.12
Total valid votes		5,162	–	–	
Rejected		29	–		
Eligible voters / turnout		11,025	47.08	-3.03	
Source(s) Source: Manitoba. Chief Electoral Officer (2011). Statement of Votes for the 40th Provincial General Election, October 4, 2011 (PDF) (Report). Winnipeg: Elections Manitoba. "Election Returns: 40th General Election". Elections Manitoba. 2011.

=== 2016 ===
2016 Manitoba general election
Party	Candidate	Votes	%	±%	Expenditures
Liberal	Cindy Lamoureux	2,641	46.55	+34.36	$20,607.02
New Democratic	Melanie Wight	1,775	31.28	-28.05	$27,748.99
Progressive Conservative	Rae Wagner	1,014	17.87	-7.58	$8,151.23
Green	Garrett Bodnaryk	216	3.81	+1.40	$0.00
Communist	Tony Petrowski	28	0.49	-0.13	$33.67
Total valid votes/expense limit		5,674	–	–	$34,273.00
Rejected		51	–		
Eligible voters / turnout		10,883	52.60	5.52	
Liberal gain from New Democratic		Swing		+31.21	
Source(s) Source: Manitoba. Chief Electoral Officer (2016). Statement of Votes for the 41st Provincial General Election, April 19, 2016 (PDF) (Report). Winnipeg: Elections Manitoba. "Election Returns: 41st General Election". Elections Manitoba. 2016.

=== 2019 ===
2016 provincial election redistributed results
Party	%
Liberal	41.6
New Democratic	33.8
Progressive Conservative	19.8
Green	4.3
Others	0.5

2019 Manitoba general election
Party	Candidate	Votes	%	±%	Expenditures
New Democratic	Diljeet Brar	2,555	39.70	5.8	$22,956.84
Progressive Conservative	Jasmine Brar	1,681	26.12	6.4	$23,945.37
Liberal	Sarb Gill	1,178	18.30	-23.3	$12,836.00
Manitoba Forward	Edda Pangilinan	1,022	15.88	–	$7,024.10
Total valid votes		6,436	–	–	
Rejected		72	–		
Eligible voters / turnout		14,124	46.08	-6.53	
New Democratic gain from Liberal		Swing		+14.6	
Source(s) Source: Manitoba. Chief Electoral Officer (2019). Statement of Votes for the 42nd Provincial General Election, September 10, 2019 (PDF) (Report). Winnipeg: Elections Manitoba. "Candidate Election Returns". Elections Manitoba. Elections Manitoba.

=== 2023 ===
2023 Manitoba general election
Party	Candidate	Votes	%	±%	Expenditures
New Democratic	Diljeet Brar	3,032	46.04	+6.35	$20,758.41
Liberal	Garry Alejo	2,074	31.50	+13.19	$7,840.29
Progressive Conservative	Nav Brar	1,479	22.46	-3.66	$6,275.04
Total valid votes/expense limit		6,585	99.43	–	$58,084.00
Total rejected and declined ballots		38	0.57	–	
Turnout		6,623	44.64	-1.43	
Eligible voters		14,835			
New Democratic hold		Swing		–3.42	
Source(s) Source: Elections Manitoba

== Previous boundaries ==
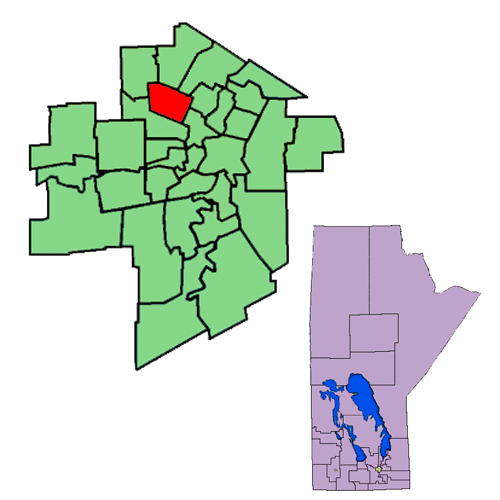
The 1999–2011 boundaries for Burrows highlighted in red.

== See also ==
- List of Manitoba provincial electoral districts
- Canadian provincial electoral districts
