= Don Scott (Manitoba politician) =

Canadian politician

Don Scott MLA

MLA for Inkster
- In office 1981–1988
- Preceded by: Sidney Green
- Succeeded by: Kevin Lamoureux

Personal details
- Born: August 5, 1948 (age 77) Liverpool, Nova Scotia, Canada
- Party: New Democratic Party of Manitoba; Green

Donald Arthur Scott (born August 5, 1948) is a former politician from Manitoba, Canada. He was the New Democratic Party of Manitoba (NDP) member of the Manitoba legislature from 1981 to 1988.

The son of Donald Alexander Scott and Mary Enid, he was raised in Liverpool, Nova Scotia, and attended a number of higher-learning institutions, including St. Francis Xavier University in Antigonish, Nova Scotia, Carleton University in Ottawa, Ontario, the University of Winnipeg and the University of Manitoba. He worked as a financial-government analyst, and at one stage worked for the Auditor General of Canada. Scott also held membership in a number of environmentally-oriented groups, including the Naturalists Society and the Solar Energy Society of Canada.

Scott was first elected to the Manitoba legislature in the Manitoba general election of 1981, in the riding of Inkster. This particular riding was notable for having been held by Sidney Green, a prominent cabinet minister in the government of NDP Premier Edward Schreyer, since 1966. Green had left the NDP in 1979, and was seeking re-election as a member of the Progressive Party of Manitoba.

At first, the NDP wanted Roland Penner to challenge Green; Scott, a relative unknown, was drafted only after Penner declined. Nevertheless, he was elected in Inkster with a clear majority, receiving 6283 votes, as Green placed third with only 783. Following this election, the Progressive Party was no longer taken seriously as a political force.

Scott was re-elected without difficulty in the provincial election of 1986, defeating his nearest competitor by almost 4000 votes. In the 1988 election, however, he was upset by Liberal Kevin Lamoureux, who outpolled him by 4466 votes to 4098. The 1988 election was called after NDP backbencher Jim Walding voted against his own party's budget, causing the government to fall two years before an election would normally have been called. Scott was one of several NDP members defeated in the following campaign; his loss in a seat previously regarded as safe for the party came as a particular surprise.

Scott later moved to Victoria, British Columbia. Following the Manitoba election of 2003, he wrote an op-ed piece for the Canadian Broadcasting Corporation, acknowledging the centrist approach of Gary Doer's government while also encouraging it to invest more in social programs.
