= Conrad Santos =

Canadian politician (1934–2016)

Member of the Legislative Assembly of Manitoba for Wellington
- In office September 21, 1999 – May 22, 2007
- Preceded by: Becky Barrett
- Succeeded by: Flor Marcelino
- Constituency: Burrows (1981–1988); Wellington (1990–2007)

Member of the Legislative Assembly of Manitoba for Broadway
- In office September 11, 1990 – September 21, 1999
- Preceded by: Constituency established
- Succeeded by: Constituency abolished

Member of the Legislative Assembly of Manitoba for Burrows
- In office November 17, 1981 – April 26, 1988
- Preceded by: Ben Hanuschak
- Succeeded by: William Chornopyski

Personal details
- Born: Conrado de Regla Santos; November 26, 1934 Philippines
- Died: February 29, 2016 (aged 81) Winnipeg, Manitoba, Canada
- Party: New Democratic

Conrado de Regla Santos (November 26, 1934 – February 29, 2016) was a politician in the province of Manitoba, Canada. He was a member of the Legislative Assembly of Manitoba from 1981 to 1988, and again from 1990 to 2007. Conrado as his family and friends called him, had three children: Evelyn Santos, Conrad Santos and Robert Santos.

The son of Federico Santos and Marcelina de Regla, he was born in the Philippines and was educated at Harvard University and the University of Michigan, receiving a PhD in political science from the latter institution. He moved to Winnipeg, Manitoba, Canada in 1965 after receiving a teaching position at the University of Manitoba, where he retired from in 2008. Santos has also worked as a consultant for the Instituto Centro-Americano de Administracion Publica in Costa Rica, and was a board member of the Citizenship Council of Manitoba from 1977 to 1980.

He sought the New Democratic Party of Manitoba (NDP) nomination for Fort Garry in the 1973 election, but was defeated. He ran for the Winnipeg City Council in 1977 and 1980, but lost both times.

Santos was first elected to the Manitoba legislature in the 1981 provincial election as a New Democrat in the northwest Winnipeg riding of Burrows, defeating NDP-turned-Progressive Member of the Legislative Assembly (MLA) Ben Hanuschak. He was re-elected in the 1986 election. In June 1984, there were unconfirmed rumours that he was considering a move to the Progressive Conservative Party.

Santos lost the Burrows NDP nomination to Doug Martindale in 1988, and subsequently entered the party's leadership election. He was not regarded as a prominent candidate, and received only five votes on the first ballot. He ran for mayor of Winnipeg in 1989, and finished a distant fourth.

In 1990, Santos won the NDP nomination for Broadway by a single vote over Marianne Cerilli, whose candidacy was supported by the party leadership. He defeated Liberal incumbent Avis Gray in the 1990 general election, and was re-elected in the 1995 election. In 1995, he endorsed Lorne Nystrom's bid to lead the federal NDP.

When the Broadway riding was eliminated by redistribution in 1999, Santos won the NDP nomination in Wellington (also in Winnipeg's northwest), and was returned by a wide margin in the 1999 provincial election. He was again re-elected in the 2003 election.

Santos was named Deputy Speaker after the elections of 1986 and 1999.

Santos left the New Democratic Party caucus shortly before the 2007 provincial election after being accused of improperly selling party membership cards. He campaigned as an independent, and finished last in a field of five candidates. He later pleaded guilty to paying the membership fees of as many as one hundred new party members, during the time when he was trying to retain his nomination. He was fined $200 under the provincial Election Finances Act, as well as court fees of $150. His lawyer argued that Santos was simply trying to help his low-income supporters, saying that the MLA "didn't have the heart" to request membership fees from people who were unable to feed their families.

He married Emerita Maglaya. Santos died in Winnipeg on February 29, 2016, at the age of 81.

== Electoral results ==
2007 Manitoba general election: Wellington
Party	Candidate	Votes	%	±%	Expenditures
New Democratic	Flor Marcelino	2,332	53.35	−20.61	$19,307.59
Liberal	Rhonda Gordon Powers	718	16.72	−1.54	$13,804.83
Progressive Conservative	José Tomas	570	12.97	+3.18	$13,232.45
Independent	Joe Chan	501	11.53	+11.53	$21,745,15
Independent	Conrad Santos	183	4.19	+4.19	$988.12
Total valid votes		4,322	98.88		
Rejected and declined ballots		49			
Turnout		4,371	46.11	+1.64	
Electors on the lists		9,480			
Source: Elections Manitoba

2003 Manitoba general election: Wellington
Party	Candidate	Votes	%	±%	Expenditures
New Democratic	Conrad Santos	3,119	73.96	+5.16	$17,844.69
Liberal	Rylan Reed	640	15.18	+2.52	$6,803.00
Progressive Conservative	Jon Penner	413	9.79	−5.85	$0.00
Communist	Glen Wreggitt	45	1.07	+1.07	$376.06
Total valid votes		4,217	100.00		
Rejected and declined ballots		65			
Turnout		4,282	44.47	−13.96	
Electors on the lists		9,629			

1999 Manitoba general election: Wellington
Party	Candidate	Votes	%	±%	Expenditures
New Democratic	Conrad Santos	4,102	68.80	+14.75	$14,922.00
Progressive Conservative	Allison Frate	935	15.64	−1.85	$11,345.52
Liberal	Bernie Doucette	757	12.66	−15.81	$10,443.45
Manitoba	Paul Baskerville	127	2.12	+2.12	$1,099.19
Total valid votes		5,921	99.01		
Rejected and declined ballots		59			
Turnout		5,980	58.43	−8.54	
Electors on the lists		10,234			
