= Becky Barrett =

American-born Canadian politician (1942–2024)

Minister of Labour and Immigration
- In office January 17, 2001 – June 25, 2003
- Preceded by: position created
- Succeeded by: Steve Ashton

Minister of Labour
- In office October 5, 1999 – January 17, 2001
- Preceded by: Mike Radcliffe
- Succeeded by: position restructured

Minister responsible for Multiculturalism
- In office October 5, 1999 – June 25, 2003
- Preceded by: Rosemary Vodrey
- Succeeded by: Steve Ashton

Minister charged with the administration of The Workers Compensation Act
- In office October 5, 1999 – June 25, 2003
- Preceded by: Mike Radcliffe
- Succeeded by: Steve Ashton

Minister charged with the administration of The Manitoba Public Insurance Corporation Act
- In office October 5, 1999 – January 17, 2001
- Preceded by: Linda McIntosh
- Succeeded by: Gord Mackintosh

Minister responsible for the Civil Service
- In office October 5, 1999 – January 17, 2001
- Preceded by: Mike Radcliffe
- Succeeded by: Greg Selinger

Member of the Legislative Assembly of Manitoba for Inkster
- In office September 21, 1999 – June 3, 2003
- Preceded by: Kevin Lamoureux
- Succeeded by: Kevin Lamoureux

Member of the Legislative Assembly of Manitoba for Wellington
- In office September 11, 1990 – September 21, 1999
- Preceded by: riding created
- Succeeded by: Conrad Santos

Personal details
- Born: Rebecca Catherine Barrett; May 1, 1942 Pensacola, Florida, U.S.
- Died: January 26, 2024 (aged 81) Winnipeg, Manitoba, Canada
- Party: New Democratic Party
- Education: University of Manitoba

Rebecca Catherine Barrett (May 1, 1942 – January 26, 2024) was an American-born Canadian politician. She served as a member of the Legislative Assembly of Manitoba from 1990 to 2003, and was a cabinet minister in the New Democratic Party (NDP) government of Gary Doer from 1999 to 2003.

== Early life and career ==
Barrett was born in Pensacola, Florida, U.S., and moved to Canada in 1975. She earned a Master's degree in social work from the University of Manitoba in 1979, and was a social worker before entering political life. During the 1980s, Barrett was the Manitoba NDP's director of organization.

== Politician ==
=== Opposition member (1990–1999) ===
Barrett was elected in the north-end Winnipeg district of Wellington in the 1990 provincial election, defeating Liberal candidate Ernie Gilroy by over 1,200 votes. The Progressive Conservative Party of Manitoba won a majority government in this election, and Barrett was appointed the New Democratic Party's family services critic in opposition. In June 1991, she criticized Premier Gary Filmon's sudden announcement that Winnipeg's child and family services would be brought under a single agency. Barrett later criticized the Filmon government for cutting several Manitobans from social assistance programs without investing in education, job creation programs and skills upgrading. She also introduced a private member's bill that, if passed, would have required the Manitoba Office of the Children's Advocate to report to the legislature rather than the Minister of Family Services.

Barrett also served as her party's justice critic. She called on the Filmon government to remove provincial judge Bruce McDonald from office in 1993, after McDonald was reported as telling a female complainant to "work something out" with a man accused of assaulting her. McDonald was later forced to resign from the bench after the Winnipeg Free Press uncovered a pattern of questionable behaviour in his decisions. Barrett also called for Manitoba to ban pellet guns in 1993, when a 14-year-old girl required hospitalization after being shot in the leg.

Barrett led the Manitoba NDP's candidate search committee in the buildup to the 1995 provincial election, and placed an emphasis on recruiting women and minority candidates. She was personally re-elected, defeating her Liberal opponent by almost 2,000 votes. The Progressive Conservatives won a second majority government provincially, and Barrett was named as her party's urban affairs critic. In May 1998, she unveiled her party's platform for revitalizing the city of Winnipeg. Highlights of the platform included giving more power to city councillors and residents' associations, providing tax incentives for inner city renewal, guaranteeing stable funding for schools, renewing several aboriginal programs and enacting a new anti-gang policy.

=== Minister of Labour and Immigration (1999–2003) ===
The New Democratic Party won a majority government in the 1999 provincial election. Barrett did not run for re-election in Wellington, but instead challenged popular Liberal incumbent Kevin Lamoureux in the neighbouring division of Inkster. She won by 143 votes. Barrett was regarded as a strong ally of incoming premier Gary Doer, and there was little surprise when he chose her as a member of his first cabinet.

Barrett was sworn in as Minister of Labour on October 5, 1999, with responsibility for administering the Manitoba Public Insurance Corporation Act and the Workers Compensation Act, as well as for the Civil Service and Multiculturalism. On January 17, 2001, her position was renamed as the Minister of Labour and Immigration, and she was relieved of responsibility for the Manitoba Public Insurance Corporation Act and the Civil Service.

Labour

Barrett's primary accomplishment in office was to reform Manitoba's labour laws, reversing many of the decisions made by the right-wing Filmon government during the 1990s. Her reform legislation, introduced in July 2000, made trade union certification automatic if 65% of employees signed membership cards, allowed interim certifications, ensured that employees would not be fired for convictions involving minor offenses, and gave employees the exclusive right to approve or reject arbitration if a labour dispute dragged on more than sixty days. Barrett argued that the changes were necessary to correct a decade of imbalance under the previous government. The bill was met with intense opposition from the business community and, in response to criticism, Barrett changed the bill to give either party in a labour dispute the right to call for binding arbitration after sixty days. Barrett also allowed parents to take more time off work after the birth of their children and increased Manitoba's minimum wage by 25 cents for every year of her tenure in office.

Following extensive consultations, Barrett subsequently introduced reforms to Manitoba's workplace safety legislation in 2002. These changes gave workplace safety and health inspectors the right to fine employers who ignore safety violations, required employers to ensure their workers receive proper safety training, and required a written health and safety program for all workplaces with more than twenty employees. Some business groups again opposed these messages, though on this occasion Barrett received support from the labour movement and the Winnipeg Free Press newspaper. Barrett's reforms also made Manitoba the first province in Canada to provide compensation for firefighters who develop certain types of cancer while on the job.

Barrett established an arm's-length complaints office for Manitoba's Autopac program in April 2000 and signed an official proclamation in the same month to commemorate the 13 Winnipeg civic workers who had been killed on the job since 1978. One month later, she announced the hiring of eight new workplace safety and health inspectors. She announced a new round of civil service hiring in early 2001, with a particular focus on employment equity. Late in her term, she announced that Winnipeg paramedics would be added to a list of essential services not allowed to strike.

Barrett also held a series of public hearings into Manitoba's pension legislation in 2003, in the first full review of the legislation since 1984.

Immigration

Shortly after her appointment to cabinet in 1999, Barrett successfully pressured the federal government to allow Manitoba to recruit more than twice as many immigrants for skilled jobs. Manitoba's percentage of Canadian immigration increased in the years that followed, and the federal government again increased the number of targeted recruitment positions in 2001, 2002 and 2003. In 2001, the Doer government introduced a medical licensing program to bring foreign-trained doctors into Canadian practice. Barrett also worked with the federal government to ensure Canada's ratification of the International Labour Organization's convention 182 against child labour.

Multiculturalism

Barrett introduced legislation in 2000 to recognize Holocaust Memorial Day in Manitoba.

Retirement

The opposition Progressive Conservatives targeted Barrett as a vulnerable minister after the business community's harsh response to her labour reforms in 2000. She was also criticized for approving a plan that would have allowed Manitoba Public Insurance to divert part of its annual surplus to infrastructural repairs at three Manitoba universities in late 2000. This plan provoked significant opposition, and was later reversed.

In late 2002, Barrett announced that she would not be a candidate in the next provincial election. Her last major act in office was to sign a new agreement with federal Immigration Minister Denis Coderre in June 2003, to increase the total immigration to Manitoba to 10,000 persons per year.

== Federal politics ==
Barrett supported Alexa McDonough's successful bid to lead the federal New Democratic Party in 1995. She later served on a committee that reviewed the federal NDP's outreach strategy in 2001, and supported Bill Blaikie's campaign to become leader of the federal NDP in 2002–03. Barrett ran federal Member of Parliament Pat Martin's successful re-election campaign in the 2006 federal election at Winnipeg Centre.

== 2003 onwards ==
In 2006, the Auditor General of Manitoba, Jon Singleton, released a report that was strongly critical of the management of the Manitoba Workers Compensation Board under its former chairman, Wally Fox-Decent. In the resulting controversy, it was noted that former WCB chief executive officer Pat Jacobsen had sent a written complaint about Fox-Decent to Barrett in March 2001. Barrett chose to refer the matter back to the WCB board of directors, a decision that some critics later described as an abdication of ministerial responsibility. Barrett's successor Nancy Allan argued that she acted properly, as the WCB board held legal authority over the matter. For his part, Fox-Decent rejected Jacobsen's complaint as a "poison pen" letter from a disgruntled employee.

Barrett died in Winnipeg on January 26, 2024, at the age of 81.

== Electoral record ==
1999 Manitoba general election: Inkster
Party	Candidate	Votes	%	±%	Expenditures
New Democratic	Becky Barrett	3,501	44.45	+14.22	$22,767.00
Liberal	Kevin Lamoureux	3,358	42.64	-7.50	$23,318.00
Progressive Conservative	George Sandhu	1,017	12.91	-2.88	$27,661.71
Total valid votes		7,876	100.00	–	
Rejected and declined ballots		50	0.63	0	
Turnout		7,926	72.27	+4.82	
Electors on the lists		10,967			
New Democratic gain from Liberal		Swing		+10.86	

1995 Manitoba general election: Wellington
Party	Candidate	Votes	%	±%	Expenditures
New Democratic	Becky Barrett	3,788	54.04	+8.03	$17,825.00
Liberal	Osmond Theodore Anderson	1,996	28.47	−2.22	$16,303.64
Progressive Conservative	Steve Place	1,226	17.49	−2.77	
Total valid votes		7,010	100.00		
Rejected and declined ballots		47			
Turnout		7,057	66.97	−1.28	
Electors on the lists		10,537			

1990 Manitoba general election: Wellington
Party	Candidate	Votes	%
New Democratic	Becky Barrett	3,484	46.01
Liberal	Ernie Gilroy	2,324	30.69
Progressive Conservative	Clyde Perry	1,534	20.26
Progressive	Neil Schipper	128	1.69
Independent	Walter Diawol	68	0.90
Independent	Stephen Keki	35	0.46
Total valid votes		7,573	
Rejected ballots		44	
Turnout		7,617	68.25
Registered voters		11,161	
