= Wellington (Manitoba provincial electoral district) =

Defunct provincial electoral district in Manitoba, Canada

Coordinates: 49.912°N 97.200°W

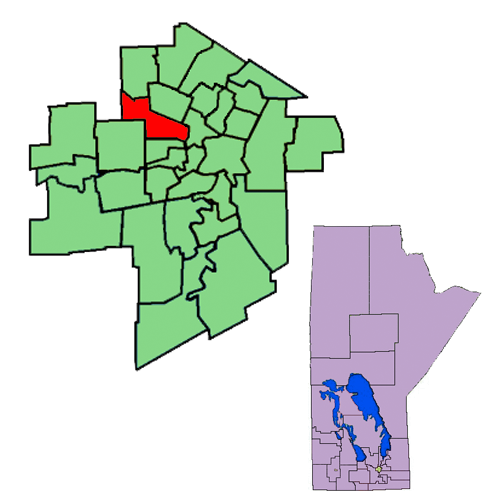
The 1999–2011 boundaries for Wellington highlighted in red

Wellington was a provincial electoral district of Manitoba, Canada. It was first created by redistribution in 1957, and formally came into being in the provincial election of 1958. The riding was eliminated in 1979, but was re-established in 1989. It was eliminated again for the 2011 election. It is located in the northwestern section of the city of Winnipeg, and is named after Arthur Wellesley, 1st Duke of Wellington.

Wellington was bordered on the east by Point Douglas, to the south by Minto and St. James, to the north by Inkster and Burrows, and to the west by the rural riding of Lakeside.

The riding's population in 1996 was 20,283. In 1999, the average family income was $32,907, with 43% of the riding's residents listed as low-income (the third highest in the province). The unemployment rate is 16%. Over 45% of the riding's dwellings are rental units, and one family in four is single-parent. Wellington's ethnic base was diverse. Seventeen per cent of its residents were aboriginal, 15% Filipino, 7% Portuguese, 3% Chinese and 2% East Indian. Manufacturing accounted for 27% of Wellington's industry, with a further 16% in services.

The riding was held by the Progressive Conservatives from 1958 to 1966. The NDP won the seat in 1966, and held it until the riding's dissolution in 1981. They also won every election since the riding's re-emergence in 1990. It was considered a safe seat for the party. In 2003, veteran MLA Conrad Santos was re-elected for the riding with almost 75% of the vote.

Following the 2008 electoral redistribution, the riding was dissolved into St. James, Minto, and the new ridings of Tyndall Park (electoral district) and Logan. This change took effect for the 2011 election.

== Members of the Legislative Assembly ==
Name	Party	Took office	Left office
Richard Seaborn	PC	1958	1966
Philip Petursson	NDP	1966	1977
Brian Corrin	NDP	1977	1981
Becky Barrett	NDP	1990	1999
Conrad Santos	NDP	1999	2007
Flor Marcelino	NDP	2007	2011

== Electoral history ==
2007 Manitoba general election
Party	Candidate	Votes	%	±%	Expenditures
New Democratic	Flor Marcelino	2,332	53.35	−20.61	$19,307.59
Liberal	Rhonda Gordon Powers	718	16.72	−1.54	$13,804.83
Progressive Conservative	José Tomas	570	12.97	+3.18	$13,232.45
Independent	Joe Chan	501	11.53	+11.53	$21,745,15
Independent	Conrad Santos	183	4.19	+4.19	$988.12
Total valid votes		4,322	98.88		
Rejected and declined ballots		49			
Turnout		4,371	46.11	+1.64	
Electors on the lists		9,480			
Source: Elections Manitoba

2003 Manitoba general election
Party	Candidate	Votes	%	±%	Expenditures
New Democratic	Conrad Santos	3,119	73.96	+5.16	$17,844.69
Liberal	Rylan Reed	640	15.18	+2.52	$6,803.00
Progressive Conservative	Jon Penner	413	9.79	−5.85	$0.00
Communist	Glen Wreggitt	45	1.07	+1.07	$376.06
Total valid votes		4,217	100.00		
Rejected and declined ballots		65			
Turnout		4,282	44.47	−13.96	
Electors on the lists		9,629			

1999 Manitoba general election
Party	Candidate	Votes	%	±%	Expenditures
New Democratic	Conrad Santos	4,102	68.80	+14.75	$14,922.00
Progressive Conservative	Allison Frate	935	15.64	−1.85	$11,345.52
Liberal	Bernie Doucette	757	12.66	−15.81	$10,443.45
Manitoba	Paul Baskerville	127	2.12	+2.12	$1,099.19
Total valid votes		5,921	99.01		
Rejected and declined ballots		59			
Turnout		5,980	58.43	−8.54	
Electors on the lists		10,234			

1995 Manitoba general election
Party	Candidate	Votes	%	±%	Expenditures
New Democratic	Becky Barrett	3,788	54.04	+8.03	$17,825.00
Liberal	Osmond Theodore Anderson	1,996	28.47	−2.22	$16,303.64
Progressive Conservative	Steve Place	1,226	17.49	−2.77	
Total valid votes		7,010	100.00		
Rejected and declined ballots		47			
Turnout		7,057	66.97	−1.28	
Electors on the lists		10,537			

1990 Manitoba general election
Party	Candidate	Votes	%
New Democratic	Becky Barrett	3,484	46.01
Liberal	Ernie Gilroy	2,324	30.69
Progressive Conservative	Clyde Perry	1,534	20.26
Progressive	Neil Schipper	128	1.69
Independent	Walter Diawol	68	0.90
Independent	Stephen Keki	35	0.46
Total valid votes		7,573	
Rejected ballots		44	
Turnout		7,617	68.25
Registered voters		11,161	

== See also ==
- List of Manitoba provincial electoral districts
- Canadian provincial electoral districts
