= Logan (Manitoba electoral district) =

Defunct provincial electoral district in Manitoba, Canada

Manitoba electoral district
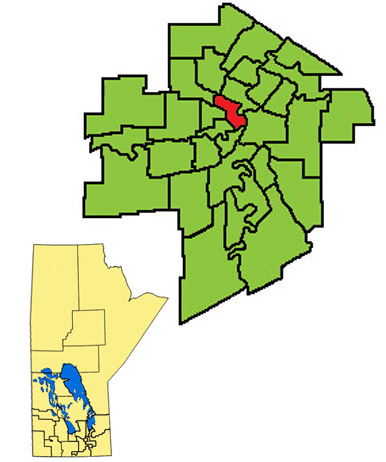

Defunct provincial electoral district
- Legislature: Legislative Assembly of Manitoba
- District created: 2008
- First contested: 2011
- Last contested: 2016

Logan is a former provincial electoral district of Manitoba, Canada. It was created by redistribution in 1956, and existed until 1989. It was named after its main thoroughfare, Winnipeg Route 47, locally called Logan Avenue.

The riding was located in the north-central region of Winnipeg, and included some of the city's poorest communities. After redistribution in 1989, some of its territory went to the riding of Point Douglas.

In 2011, Logan was re-created out of the parts of the ridings of Wellington, Minto, Fort Rouge, and Point Douglas.

== Members of the Legislative Assembly ==
Assembly	Years	Member	Party
25th	1958–1959	Stephen Juba	Independent
26th	1959–1961	Lemuel Harris	Co-operative Commonwealth Federation
26th	1961–1962	Lemuel Harris	New Democratic
27th	1962–1966	Lemuel Harris	New Democratic
28th	1966–1969	Lemuel Harris	New Democratic
29th	1969–1973	William Jenkins	New Democratic
30th	1973–1977	William Jenkins	New Democratic
31st	1977–1981	William Jenkins	New Democratic
32nd	1981–1986	Maureen Hemphill	New Democratic
33rd	1986–1988	Maureen Hemphill	New Democratic
34th	1988–1990	Maureen Hemphill	New Democratic
Riding abolished until from 1990-2011
40th	2011–2016	Flor Marcelino	New Democratic
41st	2016–2019	Flor Marcelino	New Democratic

== Electoral results ==
2016 Manitoba general election
Party	Candidate	Votes	%	±%	Expenditures
New Democratic	Flor Marcelino	2,020	39.46	-18.63	$19,429.91
Liberal	Peter Koroma	1,457	28.46	+11.57	$12,976.16
Progressive Conservative	Allie Szarkiewicz	997	19.47	+3.12	$9,053.00
Green	Jitendradas Loves-Life	397	7.75	+1.16	$0.00
Manitoba	Joe Chan	185	3.61	(-13.28)	$2,790.63
Communist	Cheryl-Anne Carr	63	1.23	+0.20	$33.67
Total valid votes/expense limit		5,119	100.0		$33,257.00
Total rejected ballots		99	–	–	
Turnout		5,218	51.98	–	
Eligible voters		10,038			
Source: Elections Manitoba

2011 Manitoba general election: Logan
Party	Candidate	Votes	%	±%	Expenditures
New Democratic	Flor Marcelino	2,985	58.09	n/a	$20,223.11
Liberal	Joe Chan	868	16.89	n/a	$27,524.91
Progressive Conservative	Tyrone Krawetz	840	16.35	n/a	$11,831.73
Green	Kristen Andrews	335	6.59	n/a	$34.62
Communist	David Tymoshchuk	53	1.03	n/a	$312.11
Total valid votes		5,081			
Rejected and declined votes		58			
Turnout		5,139	48.04		
Electors on the lists		10,698			

== See also ==
- List of Manitoba provincial electoral districts
- Canadian provincial electoral districts
