= Ben Hanuschak =

Canadian politician (1930–2026)

21st Speaker of the Legislative Assembly of Manitoba
- In office August 14, 1969 – August 20, 1970
- Preceded by: James Bilton
- Succeeded by: Peter Fox

Member of the Legislative Assembly of Manitoba for Burrows
- In office June 23, 1966 – November 17, 1981
- Preceded by: Mark Smerchanski
- Succeeded by: Conrad Santos

Personal details
- Born: April 29, 1930 Earl Grey, Saskatchewan, Canada
- Died: July 31, 2026 (aged 96) Winnipeg, Manitoba, Canada
- Party: NDP 1966-1981; Independent 1981; Progressive 1981
- Education: University of Manitoba
- Occupation: Teacher

Ben Hanuschak (April 29, 1930 – July 31, 2026) was a Canadian politician from the province of Manitoba. He was a cabinet minister in the government of New Democratic Premier Edward Schreyer, and was subsequently a founding member of the Progressive Party of Manitoba.

== Life and career ==
Hanuschak was born in Earl Grey, Saskatchewan, of Ukrainian descent. He was educated at the University of Manitoba, and worked as a teacher.

He was elected to the Manitoba legislature in 1966, defeating Liberal incumbent Mark Smerchanski in the north Winnipeg riding of Burrows. Along with others in the party, he believed that leader Russell Paulley needed to be replaced before the next election. In 1968, he was the only member of the party's parliamentary caucus to support Sidney Green's leadership bid.

Edward Schreyer became provincial NDP leader in 1969, and won the subsequent election for the party. Hanuschak was chosen Speaker of the House on August 14, 1969, and kept this position until August 20, 1970.

Hanuschak joined Schreyer's cabinet on August 20, 1970. He initially served as Minister of Consumer and Corporate and Internal Services (August 20, 1970 – December 1, 1971), and later became Minister of Education (September 9, 1971 – September 22, 1976), Minister of Colleges and Universities (September 15, 1973 – September 22, 1976), Minister of Urban Affairs (February 15, 1973 – August 29, 1973) and Minister of Continuing Education and Manpower and Minister of Tourism, Recreation and Cultural Affairs from September 22, 1976 to October 24, 1977. He left cabinet when the Schreyer government was defeated in 1977.

Like Sidney Green, Hanuschak became disillusioned with the directions taken by the provincial NDP after 1977. On March 3, 1981, he joined with Green and one other MLA to create the Progressive Party of Manitoba. Although initially socialist, this party also incorporated elements of the radical (but not extreme) right. It opposed the NDP's proposed anti-scab legislation, for instance, and was against "distinct status" recognition for minority groups.

The Progressive Party did not elect any members in the 1981 election. Hanuschak, who had been re-elected without difficulty in 1969, 1973 and 1977, received only 728 votes, against 4890 for Conrad Santos of the NDP. He ran for the Progressive Party on two further occasions, but fared no better.

He returned to political life in 1986 as a school trustee in the Seven Oaks division, in that position serving until 2006. Hanuschak died on July 31, 2026, at the age of 96.
