= Melanie Wight =

Canadian politician

Member of the Legislative Assembly of Manitoba for Burrows
- In office October 4, 2011 – April 19, 2016
- Preceded by: Doug Martindale
- Succeeded by: Cindy Lamoureux

Personal details
- Born: Melita, Manitoba, Canada
- Party: New Democrat

Melanie Wight is a Canadian politician, who was elected to the Legislative Assembly of Manitoba in the 2011 election. She represented the electoral district of Burrows as a member of the New Democratic Party of Manitoba caucus until 2016, when she lost her bid for re-election in the provincial election.

She served as the Minister of Children and Youth Opportunities from November 2014 under Premier of Manitoba Greg Selinger until leaving office.

== Electoral record ==
2011 Manitoba general election: Burrows
Party	Candidate	Votes	%	±%	Expenditures
New Democratic	Melanie Wight	3,063	59.34	-11.41	$17,078.77
Progressive Conservative	Rick Negrych	1,314	25.46	6.69	$8,890.74
Liberal	Twyla Motkaluk	629	12.19	1.69	$30,549.49
Green	Garett Peepeetch	124	2.40	–	$23.08
Communist	Frank Komarniski	32	0.62	–	$312.12
Total valid votes		5,162	–	–	
Rejected		29	–		
Eligible voters / turnout		11,025	47.08	-3.03	
Source(s) Source: Manitoba. Chief Electoral Officer (2011). Statement of Votes for the 40th Provincial General Election, October 4, 2011 (PDF) (Report). Winnipeg: Elections Manitoba. "Election Returns: 40th General Election". Elections Manitoba. 2011.
