= The Maples (electoral district) =

Provincial electoral district in Manitoba, Canada

Coordinates: 49.956°N 97.165°W

Manitoba electoral district
- Location in Winnipeg

Provincial electoral district
- Legislature: Legislative Assembly of Manitoba
MLA
Mintu Sandhu
New Democratic
- District created: 1989
- First contested: 1990
- Last contested: 2023

Demographics
- Population (2016): 23,185
- Electors (2019): 13,470
- Area (km²): 11
- Pop. density (per km²): 2,107.7
- Census division: Winnipeg

The Maples is a provincial electoral district of Manitoba, Canada. The riding was created by redistribution in 1989, has been represented in the Legislative Assembly of Manitoba since the provincial election of 1990. It is located in the north end of Winnipeg. The riding is bordered by Kildonan to the east, Inkster to the west, Burrows to the south and Gimli to the north.

In 1996, the riding's population was 19,234, with a family income of $45,853, and 25% of the riding's population classified as low-income.

By 2021, the population had risen to 23,950, the median family income was $107,000, and the poverty rate had declined to 8.6%. This may be attributed to the upward mobility of the large immigrant community in the area. The riding has one of the highest levels of ethnic diversity in Manitoba, with a population that is 36% South Asian, 30% Filipino and 20% European.

== Members of the Legislative Assembly ==
Parliament	Years	Member	Party
Riding created from Kildonan
35th	1990–1993	Gulzar Cheema	Liberal
35th	1993–1995	Gary Kowalski	Liberal
36th	1995–1997	Gary Kowalski	Liberal
36th	1997–1998	Gary Kowalski	Independent
36th	1998–1999	Gary Kowalski	Liberal
37th	1999–2003	Cris Aglugub	New Democratic
38th	2003–2007	Cris Aglugub	New Democratic
39th	2007–2011	Mohinder Saran	New Democratic
40th	2011–2016	Mohinder Saran	New Democratic
41st	2016–2017	Mohinder Saran	New Democratic
41st	2017–2019	Mohinder Saran	Independent
42nd	2019–2023	Mintu Sandhu	New Democratic
43rd	2023–present	Mintu Sandhu	New Democratic

== Electoral results ==
2023 Manitoba general election
Party	Candidate	Votes	%	±%	Expenditures
New Democratic	Mintu Sandhu	3,905	56.13	+16.62	$19,307.44
Progressive Conservative	Sumit Chawla	1,580	22.71	-3.93	$11,763.44
Liberal	Eddie Calisto-Tavares	1,472	21.16	-8.60	$6,337.48
Total valid votes/expense limit		6,957	99.29	–	$53,928.00
Total rejected and declined ballots		50	0.71	–	
Turnout		7,007	50.62	-2.46	
Eligible voters		13,842			
New Democratic hold		Swing		+10.28	
Source(s) Source: Elections Manitoba

2019 Manitoba general election
Party	Candidate	Votes	%	±%	Expenditures
New Democratic	Mintu Sandhu	2,744	38.96	+2.72	$17,241.54
Liberal	Amandeep Brar	2,070	29.39	+7.70	$24,454.07
Progressive Conservative	Aman Sandhu	1,824	25.90	-8.71	$35,130.47
Green	Kiran Gill	405	5.75	-1.69	$0.00
Total valid votes			100.0		
Total rejected ballots					
Turnout					
Eligible voters					

2016 Manitoba general election
Party	Candidate	Votes	%	±%	Expenditures
New Democratic	Mohinder Saran	2,832	36.24	-15.59	$29,088.30
Progressive Conservative	Kaur Sidhu	2,705	34.61	+8.75	$34,133.26
Liberal	Harbans Singh Brar	1,695	21.69	+3.12	$31,177.53
Green	John Redekopp	582	7.44	+3.70	$0
Total valid votes/expense limit		7,814	100.0		$44,346.00
Declined and rejected ballots		122	–	–	
Turnout		7,936	55.63	–	
Eligible voters		14,265			
New Democratic hold		Swing		-12.17	
Source: Elections Manitoba

2011 Manitoba general election
Party	Candidate	Votes	%	±%	Expenditures
New Democratic	Mohinder Saran	3,894	51.83	−3.81	$26,562.23
Progressive Conservative	Jose Tomas	1,943	25.86	−3.29	$36,087.69
Liberal	Pablito Sarinas	1,395	18.57	+4.30	$829.64
Green	John Redekopp	281	3.74	n/a	$299.89
Turnout		7,562	54.91	−0.14	
Registered voters		13,772			
New Democratic hold		Swing		−0.26	

5.94
2007 Manitoba general election
Party	Candidate	Votes	%	±%	Expenditures
New Democratic	Mohinder Saran	3,617	55.64	−12.47	$24,669.15
Progressive Conservative	Lou Fernandez	1,895	29.15	+13.21	$17,646.04
Liberal	Pritam Brar	928	14.27	−1.64	$21,652.60
Turnout		6,501	55.05		
Registered voters		11,809			
New Democratic hold		Swing		−12.84	
Source: Elections Manitoba

2003 Manitoba general election
Party	Candidate	Votes	%	±%	Expenditures
New Democratic	Cris Aglugub	3,781	68.11	+13.98	$17,536.04
Liberal	Angelina Olivier-Job	885	15.94	+0.52	$4,237.43
Progressive Conservative	Tammy Witko	885	15.94	−12.94	$801.41
Turnout		5,584	49.11	−20.45	
Registered voters		11,371			
New Democratic hold		Swing		+13.46	
Source: Elections Manitoba

1999 Manitoba general election
Party	Candidate	Votes	%	±%	Expenditures
New Democratic	Cris Aglugub	4,329	54.13	+24.36	$24,398.00
Progressive Conservative	Ellen Kowalski	2,310	28.88	+6.73	$29,457.64
Liberal	Sudhir Sandhu	1,233	15.42	–32.66	$24,842.64
Independent	Caneda Menard	73	0.91	n/a	$0.00
Turnout		7,998	69.56		
Registered voters		11,498			
New Democratic gain from Liberal		Swing		+28.51	
Source: Elections Manitoba

1995 Manitoba general election
Party	Candidate	Votes	%	±%
Liberal	Gary Kowalski	4,254	48.08	+8.25
New Democratic	Inderjit Claire	2,634	29.77	+2.27
Progressive Conservative	Fred Arrojado	1,960	22.15	-10.51
Total valid votes		,	100.00	-
Rejected and declined ballots		48	–	–
Turnout		8,896	66.38	
Eligible voters		13,402		
Liberal hold		Swing		+2.99
Source: Elections Manitoba

Manitoba provincial by-election, September 21, 1993 Resignation of Gulzar Cheema
Party	Candidate	Votes	%	±%
Liberal	Gary Kowalski	3,619	50.84	+11.01
New Democratic	Norma Walker	2,138	30.03	+2.53
Progressive Conservative	David Langtry	1,362	19.13	-13.53
Total valid votes		7,119	100.00	
Turnout				
Eligible voters				
Liberal hold		Swing		+4.24

1990 Manitoba general election
Party	Candidate	Votes	%
Liberal	Gulzar Singh Cheema	3,273	39.83
Progressive Conservative	Norman Isler	2,684	32.66
New Democratic	Tony Valeri	2,260	27.50
Total valid votes		8,217	100.00
Rejected ballots		36	
Turnout		8,253	67.00
Eligible voters		12,318	
Source: Elections Manitoba

== Previous boundaries ==
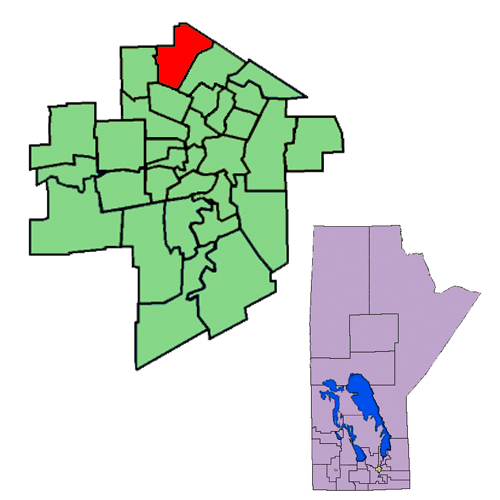
The 1998–2011 boundaries for The Maples highlighted in red.

== See also ==
- List of Manitoba provincial electoral districts
- Canadian provincial electoral districts
