= Mintu Sandhu =

Canadian politician

The Honourable Mintu Sandhu MLA

Minister of Public Service Delivery
- Incumbent
- Assumed office November 13, 2024
- Premier: Wab Kinew
- Preceded by: Lisa Naylor as Minister of Consumer Protection and Government Services

Member of the Legislative Assembly of Manitoba for The Maples
- Incumbent
- Assumed office September 10, 2019
- Preceded by: Mohinder Saran

Personal details
- Born: India
- Party: New Democratic

Mintu Sandhu is a Canadian politician, who was elected to the Legislative Assembly of Manitoba in the 2019 Manitoba general election. He represents the electoral district of The Maples as a member of the New Democratic Party of Manitoba.

Born and raised in India, Sandhu moved to Canada in 1989. Prior to his election to the legislature, he worked as the manager of the city's Unicity Taxi service.

== Electoral history ==
2023 Manitoba general election: The Maples
Party	Candidate	Votes	%	±%	Expenditures
New Democratic	Mintu Sandhu	3,905	56.13	+16.62	$19,307.44
Progressive Conservative	Sumit Chawla	1,580	22.71	-3.93	$11,763.44
Liberal	Eddie Calisto-Tavares	1,472	21.16	-8.60	$6,337.48
Total valid votes/expense limit		6,957	99.29	–	$53,928.00
Total rejected and declined ballots		50	0.71	–	
Turnout		7,007	50.62	-2.46	
Eligible voters		13,842			
New Democratic hold		Swing		+10.28	
Source(s) Source: Elections Manitoba

2019 Manitoba general election: The Maples
Party	Candidate	Votes	%	±%	Expenditures
New Democratic	Mintu Sandhu	2,744	38.96	+2.72	$17,241.54
Liberal	Amandeep Brar	2,070	29.39	+7.70	$24,454.07
Progressive Conservative	Aman Sandhu	1,824	25.90	-8.71	$35,130.47
Green	Kiran Gill	405	5.75	-1.69	$0.00
Total valid votes			100.0		
Total rejected ballots					
Turnout					
Eligible voters					
