= Sidney Green (politician) =

Canadian politician (1929–2026)

Member of the Legislative Assembly of Manitoba for Inkster
- In office June 23, 1966 – November 17, 1981
- Preceded by: Morris Gray
- Succeeded by: Don Scott

Personal details
- Born: August 1, 1929 Winnipeg, Manitoba, Canada
- Died: June 7, 2026 (aged 96) Winnipeg, Manitoba, Canada
- Party: Progressive; Independent (1979–81); New Democratic (until 1979)
- Education: University of Manitoba
- Profession: lawyer

Sidney Green (August 1, 1929 – June 7, 2026) was a Canadian politician in Manitoba. He twice ran for the leadership of the New Democratic Party of Manitoba, served in the cabinet of Premier Edward Schreyer, and later formed the Progressive Party of Manitoba.

== Life and career ==
Green was born into a Jewish family in the mostly working-class North End of Winnipeg, Manitoba. He graduated from the University of Manitoba's Law School, and subsequently worked as a labour lawyer. While a student, Green articled with Joseph Zuken, then a Communist school trustee and later an alderman. Despite having some radical tendencies in his early years, Green never became involved with the Communist Party.

On the advice of Stephen Lewis and Lloyd Stinson, Green joined the federal New Democratic Party (NDP) in the early 1960s soon after it was founded. He was the party's federal candidate for Winnipeg South in the 1962 election, placing a distant third in a riding that the party acknowledged it would probably not win. Shortly thereafter, Green won election to the municipal council of Winnipeg for a North End ward, defeating Communist candidate William Kardash and John J. Thomas of the pro-business Metro Election Committee. Green was re-elected in 1964.

He resigned his seat to contest Winnipeg South again federally in 1965. He became the first NDP or Co-operative Commonwealth Federation candidate to receive over 10,000 votes in the riding, but still placed third.

In 1966, Green won election to the Legislative Assembly of Manitoba for the north-end Winnipeg riding of Inkster. Ironically, he had initially lost the party's nomination to Howard Mitchell by sixty-one votes to three. Mitchell withdrew before the election, however, and Green took his place. In the general election, Green finished well ahead of his three opponents, including Communist Party leader William Ross.

During this period, Russell Paulley, an old-style labour politician not popular among younger members of his caucus, led the provincial NDP. Along with others in the party, Green believed the NDP needed a new leader to become a serious challenger for government. He supported a plan to have federal Member of Parliament (MP) Edward Schreyer replace Paulley in 1968. That came to nothing, and on September 3, 1968, Green announced he would seek the party's leadership himself. Although Green claimed (probably correctly) he was not challenging Paulley on ideological grounds, many interpreted his challenge as being endorsed by the party's radical left. Many members of the NDP's youth wing endorsed Green's campaign for the leadership.

One month later, the remainder of the provincial NDP caucus (aside from Ben Hanuschak, who backed Green) announced they would support Paulley in the leadership challenge, with the understanding he would stand down in favour of Ed Schreyer the following year. With this unusual endorsement, Paulley defeated Green by 213 to 168 votes at a delegated convention.

Green was the first Jewish Canadian politician to make a serious bid for the leadership of a major party. He later claimed his efforts opened the door for future leadership bids by Dave Barrett, who won the British Columbia NDP's leadership in 1970, and David Lewis, who was elected leader of the federal party in 1971. Few other prominent Jewish New Democrats in Winnipeg supported his campaign, however. Green later accused Saul Cherniack, Saul Miller, and David Orlikow (the first two of whom were also MLAs, the last the MP for Winnipeg North, in 1968) of promoting "Jewish-fuelled anti-semitism", claiming that a Jewish lawyer would be unelectable in rural Manitoba. Green's relations with Cherniack, Miller, and Orlikow deteriorated during the 1968 campaign, and remained poor thereafter.

He ran against Ed Schreyer for the party's leadership in 1969, in what proved to be a much less divisive campaign. Schreyer won this contest by 506 votes to 177.

Green was easily re-elected in Inkster in 1969, and with the NDP defeating the governing Progressive Conservatives at a provincewide level to form the first social democratic government in Manitoba's history, held several portfolios in Schreyer's government. He served as Minister of Health and Social Services from July 15, 1969 to December 18, 1969, Minister of Mines and Natural Resources from December 18, 1969 to March 3, 1972 (the position was renamed Minister of Mines, Resources and Environmental Management in 1971) and Minister of Urban Affairs from September 9, 1971 to March 3, 1972.

On March 3, 1972, Green resigned from cabinet over a disagreement with Premier Schreyer on funding to denominational schools: Schreyer supported limited funding and Green opposed any funding. The issue was subsequently resolved, and Green rejoined cabinet on July 21, 1972, returning to the portfolio of Mines, Resources and Environmental Management. He became Minister responsible for the Manitoba Development Corporation on February 16, 1973, and remained in this position for the rest of the Schreyer government's lifetime.

During his time in government, Green was involved in the government's controversial negotiations over the proposed flooding of South Indian Lake. He also publicly opposed an attempt by Russell Paulley (by then Labour Minister) to impose "back to work legislation" on striking Winnipeg Transit workers in 1976.

After the Schreyer government was defeated in 1977, Green became disillusioned with the direction of the provincial NDP. He said the party was becoming dominated by "the trade union movement and militant feminists", and opposed its plans to introduce anti-scab legislation if re-elected. Despite his roots as a labour lawyer, Green opposed what he called "special privileges" for unionized labour.

After Schreyer was appointed Governor General of Canada in 1979, Green stood for the party's interim leadership, but lost to Howard Pawley in a vote of caucus members. At least five of the seven MLAs who supported Green left the NDP during the 1980s. Green himself left the Manitoba NDP on December 4, 1979, citing the proposed anti-scab legislation as his reason. He sat as an independent MLA until March 3, 1981, when he became one of the founding members of the Progressive Party of Manitoba. The party recognized Green as its leader. MLAs Hanuschak and Bud Boyce were also in the new party.

The Progressive Party was regarded as socialist initially, and supported traditional leftist causes such as full employment and increased profits taxation on resource industries. The party also opposed "special status" designations for minority groups, however, and was arguably closer to the political right in such matters.

The Progressives hoped to run a full slate of candidates in the 1981 election, but were unsuccessful. All the party's candidates were defeated. Green, who had been re-elected easily in 1973 and 1977, placed a distant third in Inkster, receiving only 783 votes against 6,283 for Don Scott of the NDP.

He continued as leader of the Progressive Party. In 1984, he contested a by-election in the south Winnipeg riding of Fort Garry, but finished fourth with 1,035 votes (Liberal leader Sharon Carstairs was also a candidate). He ran in Wolseley, a district in central Winnipeg, in 1986, this time earning 347 votes and again placing fourth.

The Progressive Party gained some notoriety in the 1988 election by convincing former Manitoba premier Douglas Campbell, a veteran of the province's original Progressive Party, to speak at a fundraising event. This did not help the party's electoral fortunes, however: all its candidates again were defeated, and Green won only 445 votes when he ran in Kildonan.

Green made further unsuccessful bids for the legislature in the 1990 general election in Kildonan, and the 1992 Crescentwood by-election, coming in fourth both times. He was unable to find a successor as party leader in 1995, and dissolved the Progressive Party on July 13 of that year, after having fielded no candidates in the provincial election on April 25.

Green's political position shifted rightward in the 1980s. In a 1990 advertisement, the Progressive Party argued in support of balanced budgets and rejected any state sanctioning of "distinct status" for minority groups such as aboriginals and homosexuals. In addition to leading the Progressive Party, Green also continued his law practice throughout the 1980s. He published his memoir, Rise and Fall of a Political Animal, in 2003.

In May 2013, Green wrote an opinion piece advocating the abolition of the Senate of Canada.

Green died on June 7, 2026, at the age of 96.

== Sources ==
- Schulz, Herbert. Betrayal: Prairie Agricultural Politics in the 1950s ISBN 1-55238-098-X. Google Books
