= Cris Aglugub =

Canadian politician

Member of the Legislative Assembly of Manitoba for The Maples
- In office September 21, 1999 – May 22, 2007
- Preceded by: Gary Kowalski
- Succeeded by: Mohinder Saran

Personal details
- Born: December 25, 1942 (age 83) Negros Occidental, Philippine Commonwealth
- Party: New Democratic Party, Progressive Conservative Party
- Education: Araneta University Foundation; Red River Community College (BSc)
- Occupation: Computer programmer, politician

Cris LaCara Aglugub (born December 25, 1942) is a former Canadian politician in Manitoba, Canada. He was a member of the Legislative Assembly of Manitoba from 1999 to 2007.

== Education ==
Aglugub was educated at Araneta University Foundation in the Philippines, and at Red River Community College in Manitoba. He holds a Bachelor of Science degree in agriculture.

== Early career ==
Before entering politics, he worked as a computer programmer and provided technical support to Manitoba Agriculture. He has served on the Mayor's Race Relations Committee and the Manitoba Citizenship Council's Language Bank, and is a Past President of the Philippine Association of Manitoba. He co-founded the Philippine Centre of Manitoba in 1984, and was instrumental in founding a community day care facility. During the 1990s, Aglugub helped facilitate a twinning agreement between Winnipeg and Manila, with a corresponding arrangement between the University of Manitoba and the Pamantasan ng Lungsod ng Maynila.

== Political career ==
Aglugub was elected to the Manitoba legislature in the 1999 election, running as a New Democrat in the north Winnipeg riding of The Maples. He received 4,329 votes against 2,310 for his nearest opponent, Progressive Conservative Ellen Kowalski. Following the NDP's election victory (the Conservatives had formed government since 1988), he was named Legislative Assistant to the Minister of Labour and Immigration, and subsequently to the Minister of Intergovernmental Affairs and Trade. In 2003, he supported Bill Blaikie's bid to become leader of the federal New Democratic Party.

Aglugub was re-elected in the 2003 Manitoba general election, receiving about 68% of the vote in The Maples. He was not re-nominated for the New Democratic Party in the 2007 provincial election; Mohinder Saran retained the district for the NDP. He ran in the 2011 provincial election as a Progressive Conservative in the riding of Tyndall Park, being contested for the first time, finishing third behind Ted Marcelino of the NDP and Roldan Sevillano of the Liberals.
