= Flor Marcelino =

Canadian politician (born 1951)

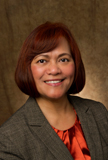

Leader of the Opposition in Manitoba
- In office May 7, 2016 – September 16, 2017
- Preceded by: Brian Pallister
- Succeeded by: Wab Kinew

Interim Leader of the Manitoba New Democratic Party
- In office May 7, 2016 – September 16, 2017
- Preceded by: Greg Selinger
- Succeeded by: Wab Kinew

Minister of Multiculturalism and Literacy
- In office October 18, 2013 – May 3, 2016
- Premier: Greg Selinger
- Preceded by: Christine Melnick

Manitoba Minister of Culture, Heritage and Tourism
- In office November 3, 2009 – October 18, 2013
- Premier: Greg Selinger
- Preceded by: Eric Robinson
- Succeeded by: Ron Lemieux

Minister responsible for Multiculturalism
- In office November 3, 2009 – January 13, 2012
- Premier: Greg Selinger
- Preceded by: Nancy Allan
- Succeeded by: Christine Melnick

Member of the Legislative Assembly of Manitoba for Logan Wellington 2007-2011
- In office October 4, 2011 – August 12, 2019
- Preceded by: first member
- Succeeded by: riding dissolved
- In office May 22, 2007 – October 4, 2011
- Preceded by: Conrad Santos
- Succeeded by: riding dissolved

Personal details
- Born: 1951 or 1952 Manila, Philippines
- Party: New Democratic Party
- Children: Malaya Marcelino (daughter)

Flor Marcelino (born October 5, 1951) is a politician in Manitoba, Canada. She was elected to the Legislative Assembly of Manitoba in the 2007 provincial election, for the electoral division of Wellington. In the 2011 provincial election, she was re-elected to a second term in office in the new electoral district of Logan. Marcelino is a member of the New Democratic Party. On May 7, 2016, she was named interim leader of the party and leader of the opposition in the Manitoba legislature following the defeat of the NDP government in the provincial election and the resignation of party leader Greg Selinger.

She retired from the legislature at the 2019 Manitoba general election. Her daughter, Malaya Marcelino, was elected as a first-time MLA in that same election.

In 2026, Marcelino endorsed Avi Lewis in that year's federal NDP leadership race.

== Background ==
Marcelino was the first woman of colour to be elected as a MLA in the province.

Prior to her election to the legislature, Marcelino was editor and publisher of The Philippine Times, a community newspaper for the Filipino Canadian community in Winnipeg. Her brother-in-law Ted Marcelino was also elected to the Legislative Assembly in 2011.

== Electoral history ==
2007 Manitoba general election: Wellington
Party	Candidate	Votes	%	±%	Expenditures
New Democratic	Flor Marcelino	2,332	53.35	−20.61	$19,307.59
Liberal	Rhonda Gordon Powers	718	16.72	−1.54	$13,804.83
Progressive Conservative	José Tomas	570	12.97	+3.18	$13,232.45
Independent	Joe Chan	501	11.53	+11.53	$21,745,15
Independent	Conrad Santos	183	4.19	+4.19	$988.12
Total valid votes		4,322	98.88		
Rejected and declined ballots		49			
Turnout		4,371	46.11	+1.64	
Electors on the lists		9,480			
Source: Elections Manitoba

2011 Manitoba general election: Logan
Party	Candidate	Votes	%	±%	Expenditures
New Democratic	Flor Marcelino	2,985	58.09	n/a	$20,223.11
Liberal	Joe Chan	868	16.89	n/a	$27,524.91
Progressive Conservative	Tyrone Krawetz	840	16.35	n/a	$11,831.73
Green	Kristen Andrews	335	6.59	n/a	$34.62
Communist	David Tymoshchuk	53	1.03	n/a	$312.11
Total valid votes		5,081			
Rejected and declined votes		58			
Turnout		5,139	48.04		
Electors on the lists		10,698			

2016 Manitoba general election: Logan
Party	Candidate	Votes	%	±%
New Democratic	Flor Marcelino	2,020	39.46	-18.63
Liberal	Peter Koroma	1,457	28.46	+11.57
Progressive Conservative	Allie Szarkiewicz	997	19.47	+3.12
Green	Jitendradas Loves-Life	397	7.75	+1.16
Manitoba	Joe Chan	185	3.61	+3.61
Communist	Cheryl-Anne Carr	63	1.23	+0.20
Total valid votes		5,119	100.0	
Eligible voters		–		
Source: Elections Manitoba
