= William Chornopyski =

Canadian politician

- Bill Chornopyski, circa 1984

Personal details
- Born: May 27, 1922 Sundown, Manitoba, Canada

William "Bill" Chornopyski (May 27, 1922 – September 11, 2002) was a politician in Manitoba, Canada. He was associated with the New Democratic Party of Manitoba for many years, but was elected to the provincial legislature in 1988 as a member of the Manitoba Liberal Party.

The son of George and Verna Chornopyski, he was born in Sundown, Manitoba, and served in the Canadian Forces during World War II. He was employed by the Canadian Pacific Railway from 1944 to 1966, and worked as a sales executive at General Motors from 1966 to 1971. From 1971 to 1973, he was the owner and operator of the Arlington Athletic Club. Chornopyski also served as president of the Burrows Constituency NDP (provincial), and as secretary of the Winnipeg North federal NDP organization. He was married to Elsie Wagner and had four children.

In 1974, Chornopyski was elected as a councillor in the city of Winnipeg. He served in this capacity until 1986, and also became deputy mayor of the city in 1982. He was a founder of Winnipeg's Block Parent Program in this period and served on several community boards, as well as being on the executive of the Ukrainian Legion Branch #141.

In the 1980s, Chornopyski was an opponent of NDP Premier Howard Pawley's plans to legally entrench French-language services in the province. He appears to have left the NDP over this issue around 1984, at roughly the same time as longtime party MLA and Edward Schreyer-era cabinet minister Russell Doern. In the provincial election of 1986, Chornopyski contested the riding of Burrows as an independent candidate, and lost to incumbent New Democrat Conrad Santos by 2,110 votes. Later in the year, he lost his seat on city council to Terry Wachniak by 46 votes.

In the provincial election of 1988, Chornopyski ran as a Liberal in Burrows and defeated NDP candidate Doug Martindale by 109 votes.

The Liberals increased their parliamentary representation from one seat to twenty in the 1988 election, and Chornopyski sat with the official opposition in parliament. His time in the provincial legislature proved to be short-lived, however — in the provincial election of 1990, he lost to Martindale by over 2000 votes amid a general decline in Liberal fortunes. He did not seek a return to public office, instead going back to farming, and died at the Morris General Hospital in 2002.

== Election results ==
1988 Manitoba general election: Burrows
Party	Candidate	Votes	%	±%
Liberal	William Chornopyski	3,114	42.27	33.49
New Democratic	Doug Martindale	3,005	40.79	-12.25
Progressive Conservative	Allan Yap	1,040	14.12	-0.09
Independent	Michael Kibzey	129	1.75	–
Communist	Lorne Robson	79	1.07	-0.89
Total valid votes		7,367	–	–
Rejected		45	–	
Eligible voters / turnout		11,222	66.05	4.45
Liberal gain from New Democratic		Swing		+16.52
Source(s) Source: Manitoba. Chief Electoral Officer (1999). Statement of Votes for the 37th Provincial General Election, September 21, 1999 (PDF) (Report). Winnipeg: Elections Manitoba.

1990 Manitoba general election: Burrows
Party	Candidate	Votes	%	±%
New Democratic	Doug Martindale	4,206	54.34	13.55
Liberal	William Chornopyski	2,056	26.56	-15.71
Progressive Conservative	Chris Aune	1,478	19.10	4.98
Total valid votes		7,740	–	–
Rejected		29	–	
Eligible voters / turnout		11,619	66.86	0.82
Source(s) Source: Manitoba. Chief Electoral Officer (1999). Statement of Votes for the 37th Provincial General Election, September 21, 1999 (PDF) (Report). Winnipeg: Elections Manitoba.
