= Mohinder Saran =

Canadian politician

Member of the Legislative Assembly of Manitoba for The Maples
- In office May 22, 2007 – August 12, 2019
- Preceded by: Cris Aglugub
- Succeeded by: Mintu Sandhu

Personal details
- Born: Punjab, India
- Party: Independent (since 2017)
- Other political affiliations: New Democratic (2007–2017)

Mohinder Saran is a politician in Manitoba, Canada. He represented the electoral division of The Maples in the Legislative Assembly of Manitoba from 2007 until 2019. He was first elected in the 2007 provincial election. Saran was re-elected as a member of the New Democratic Party in two subsequent elections and served as Minister of Housing and Community Development from 2015 to 2016 in the final government of Greg Selinger.

He was suspended from the NDP caucus on December 15, 2016 due to sexual harassment allegations, and was removed from caucus on January 31, 2017. He did not run in the 2019 provincial election.

== Personal life ==
Saran was born in the Punjab region of India before moving to Canada in 1970.
