= Doug Martindale =

Canadian politician (born 1947)

The Reverend Doug Martindale

Member of the Legislative Assembly of Manitoba for Burrows
- In office 1990–2011
- Preceded by: William Chornopyski
- Succeeded by: Melanie Wight

Personal details
- Born: May 25, 1947 (age 79) Brockville, Ontario, Canada
- Party: New Democrat

Doug Martindale (born May 25, 1947) is a politician in Manitoba, Canada. He was a member of the Legislative Assembly of Manitoba from 1990 to 2011, serving as a member of the New Democratic Party.

== Early life and career ==
Martindale was born in Brockville, Ontario. He holds a Bachelor of Arts degree from Brock University (1973) and a Master of Divinity degree from Victoria University (1976). He is an ordained United Church minister, and has practiced in Saskatchewan (1976–80) and at a mission in north-end Winnipeg (1980–90). He has been involved in several outreach programs among Winnipeg's poor and aboriginal communities, and remains active in efforts to combat homelessness. He helped to convert St. John's United Church into a co-op apartment complex, and was a founding member of Inner City Voice newspaper. In the legislature, he has served as Chair of the Justice, Social and Economic Development Committees.

In 1973, he married Carol Wachniak. The couple has two children.

Martindale defeated incumbent MLA Conrad Santos to win the New Democratic Party nomination for the northwest Winnipeg division of Burrows in the 1988 provincial election. He was defeated in the general election by Liberal candidate William Chornopyski. The seat had previously been regarded as safe for the NDP, but local divisions and a provincial swing away from the party contributed to Martindale's defeat.

== Opposition member ==
NDP support had recovered somewhat by the 1990 election, and Martindale was able to defeat Chornopyski in a rematch. The Progressive Conservatives won a majority government under Gary Filmon, and Martindale served in the official opposition as his party's critic for family services and housing. He opposed the Filmon government's cuts to child welfare and education support, and called for an inquiry into allegations of emotional abuse and unethical treatment at the Osborne House battered women's shelter. He also criticized the government's introduction of a "welfare fraud hotline", describing it as "punitive and unnecessary" and noting that Manitoba lost far more money each year to income tax fraud. Nonetheless, Martindale supported the government's early intervention policy as a means of keeping more children with their families and out of the supervision of Child and Family Services.

Martindale was re-elected in the 1995 general election, as the Progressive Conservatives won a second majority government across the province. He continued to serve as family services critic, and opposed another round of child welfare cuts introduced by the Filmon government later in the year. When the government introduced further benefit cuts of up to 10% for single, employable people, Martindale described Filmon's administration as the "cruelest, most heartless government in Canada". In 1999, he and fellow NDP MLA Diane McGifford organized consultative meetings of parents and day-care providers.

== Government backbencher ==
The New Democratic Party won a majority government in the 1999 general election under the leadership of Gary Doer. Martindale was easily re-elected in Burrows, defeating controversial school trustee Mike Babinsky of the Liberal Party. He served as a backbench supporter of the Doer government. In 2002, he was appointed to a four-member task force seeking public input on the future of the province's mining and petroleum sectors. There was some speculation that he would be appointed to cabinet after his re-election in 2003, but this did not occur.

In 2004, Martindale brought forward a parliamentary motion urging the provincial government to declare the last Saturday of November as Day of the Ukrainian Famine/Genocide, commemorating the victims of the Holodomor of 1932-33. He was an international observer to the Ukrainian presidential election in December 2004.

Martindale was re-elected in the 2007 provincial election.

In 2011, he announced that he would not be seeking reelection. Martindale said that he would be teaching at Booth University College and Providence University College, and would return to preaching as a United Church minister.

== Federal politics ==
Martindale supported Lorne Nystrom's bid to become leader of the federal New Democratic Party in 1995, and endorsed Bill Blaikie in 2003.

== Trivia ==
- Martindale played the role of J.S. Woodsworth during a 1994 commemoration of the 1919 Winnipeg General Strike.
- Since 2001, Martindale has taken part in a challenge organized by Evangelicals for Social Action to fast and pray during the Muslim holy month of Ramadan. He has called for greater dialogue between Christian and Muslim groups.

== Electoral record ==
2007 Manitoba general election: Burrows
Party	Candidate	Votes	%	±%	Expenditures
New Democratic	Doug Martindale	3,790	70.75	1.74	$16,207.51
Progressive Conservative	Rick Negrych	1,005	18.76	11.47	$13,322.81
Liberal	Bernd Hohne	562	10.49	-11.09	$3,416.97
Total valid votes		5,357	–	–	
Rejected		29	–		
Eligible voters / turnout		10,747	50.12	-0.01	
Source(s) Source: Manitoba. Chief Electoral Officer (2007). Statement of Votes for the 39th Provincial General Election, May 22, 2007 (PDF) (Report). Winnipeg: Elections Manitoba.

2003 Manitoba general election: Burrows
Party	Candidate	Votes	%	±%	Expenditures
New Democratic	Doug Martindale	4,004	69.01	2.67	$14,056.29
Liberal	Tony Sanchez	1,252	21.58	-2.23	$17,240.92
Progressive Conservative	Derek Lambert	423	7.29	-2.03	$0.00
Green	Catharine Johannson	123	2.12	–	$200.80
Total valid votes		5,802	–	–	
Rejected		31	–		
Eligible voters / turnout		11,636	50.13	-15.51	
Source(s) Source: Manitoba. Chief Electoral Officer (2003). Statement of Votes for the 38th Provincial General Election, June 3, 2003 (PDF) (Report). Winnipeg: Elections Manitoba.

1999 Manitoba general election: Burrows
Party	Candidate	Votes	%	±%	Expenditures
New Democratic	Doug Martindale	5,151	66.34	-1.13	$21,056.00
Liberal	Mike Babinsky	1,849	23.81	9.26	$24,553.70
Progressive Conservative	Cheryl Clark	724	9.32	-8.66	$11,879.28
Communist	Darrell Rankin	41	0.53	–	$0.00
Total valid votes		7,765	–	–	
Rejected		55	–		
Eligible voters / turnout		11,914	65.64	1.73	
Source(s) Source: Manitoba. Chief Electoral Officer (1999). Statement of Votes for the 37th Provincial General Election, September 21, 1999 (PDF) (Report). Winnipeg: Elections Manitoba.

1995 Manitoba general election: Burrows
Party	Candidate	Votes	%	±%	Expenditures
New Democratic	Doug Martindale	4,748	67.46	13.12	$18,404.00
Progressive Conservative	Bill McGee	1,266	17.99	-1.11	$13,414.34
Liberal	Naty Yankech	1,024	14.55	-12.01	$13,401.87
Total valid votes		7,038	–	–	
Rejected		58	–		
Eligible voters / turnout		11,104	63.90	-2.96	
Source(s) Source: Manitoba. Chief Electoral Officer (1999). Statement of Votes for the 37th Provincial General Election, September 21, 1999 (PDF) (Report). Winnipeg: Elections Manitoba.

1990 Manitoba general election: Burrows
Party	Candidate	Votes	%	±%
New Democratic	Doug Martindale	4,206	54.34	13.55
Liberal	William Chornopyski	2,056	26.56	-15.71
Progressive Conservative	Chris Aune	1,478	19.10	4.98
Total valid votes		7,740	–	–
Rejected		29	–	
Eligible voters / turnout		11,619	66.86	0.82
Source(s) Source: Manitoba. Chief Electoral Officer (1999). Statement of Votes for the 37th Provincial General Election, September 21, 1999 (PDF) (Report). Winnipeg: Elections Manitoba.

1988 Manitoba general election: Burrows
Party	Candidate	Votes	%	±%
Liberal	William Chornopyski	3,114	42.27	33.49
New Democratic	Doug Martindale	3,005	40.79	-12.25
Progressive Conservative	Allan Yap	1,040	14.12	-0.09
Independent	Michael Kibzey	129	1.75	–
Communist	Lorne Robson	79	1.07	-0.89
Total valid votes		7,367	–	–
Rejected		45	–	
Eligible voters / turnout		11,222	66.05	4.45
Liberal gain from New Democratic		Swing		+16.52
Source(s) Source: Manitoba. Chief Electoral Officer (1999). Statement of Votes for the 37th Provincial General Election, September 21, 1999 (PDF) (Report). Winnipeg: Elections Manitoba.

All electoral information is taken from Elections Manitoba. Expenditures refer to candidate expenses.
