= Inkster (electoral district) =

Defunct provincial electoral district in Manitoba, Canada

Coordinates: 49.945°N 97.197°W

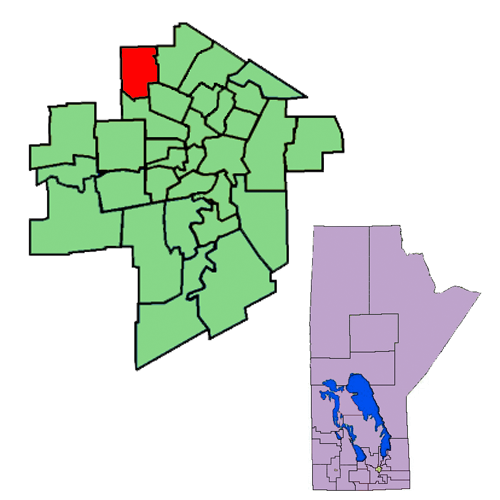
The 1998–2011 boundaries for Inkster highlighted in red.

Inkster was a provincial electoral district of Manitoba, Canada. It was located in the northwestern corner of the city of Winnipeg. Officially created by redistribution in 1957, it has existed since the provincial election of 1958.

The riding was named after the Inkster family, who were prominent local figures at the time of the province's creation in 1870. John Inkster was a member of Louis Riel's provisional government, while Colin Inkster was a member of the province's Legislative Council (which existed from 1871 to 1876).

There were 19,246 persons living in the riding in 1996. Inkster had a broad range of income levels and a strong working-class presence (the manufacturing sector accounting for 23% of industry in 1999). Census reports from 1999 showed an average family income of $51,274, with 8.10% unemployment.

Inkster had the third-largest immigrant population of all ridings in the province, at over 30% of the total population. 21% of the riding's residents are Filipino, 6% are Ukrainian, and 5% are East Indian. Only 4% of the population is above age 65.

Like many other north-end Winnipeg ridings, Inkster traditionally supported the New Democratic Party and its predecessor, the Cooperative Commonwealth Federation, although Liberal Kevin Lamoureux represented the riding for all but four years from 1988 to 2010. For the 2011 election, Inkster was dissolved into The Maples and the new riding of Tyndall Park.

== Members of the Legislative Assembly ==
Name	Party	Took office	Left office
Morris Gray	CCF	1958	1961
	NDP	1961	1966
Sidney Green	NDP	1966	1979
	Independent NDP	1979	1981
	Prog	1981	1981
Don Scott	NDP	1981	1988
Kevin Lamoureux	Lib	1988	1997
	Independent Liberal	1997	1998
	Lib	1998	1999
Becky Barrett	NDP	1999	2003
Kevin Lamoureux (2nd time)	Lib	2003	2010

== Electoral history ==
2007 Manitoba general election
Party	Candidate	Votes	%	±%	Expenditures
Liberal	Kevin Lamoureux	3,962	57.49	+4.10	$26,490.96
New Democratic	Romulo Magsino	2,358	34.13	−7.33	$26,612.09
Progressive Conservative	Roger Bennett	543	7.89	+4.24	$8,590.43
Total valid votes		6,863	99.58		
Rejected and declined votes		29			
Turnout		6,892	61.43	+0.07	
Electors on the lists		11,215			

2003 Manitoba general election
Party	Candidate	Votes	%	±%	Expenditures
Liberal	Kevin Lamoureux	3,671	53.39	+10.75	$27,970.42
New Democratic	Mario Santos	2,851	41.46	−2.99	$21,230.80
Progressive Conservative	Michael T. Ledarney	251	3.65	−9.26	$10.69
Green	Mario Ducusin	103	1.50	+1.50	$174.48
Total valid votes		6,876	100.0		
Total rejected ballots		79	–	–	
Turnout		6,955	61.36	−10.91	
Eligible voters		11,335			
Liberal gain from New Democratic		Swing		+6.87	

1999 Manitoba general election
Party	Candidate	Votes	%	±%	Expenditures
New Democratic	Becky Barrett	3,501	44.45	+14.22	$22,767.00
Liberal	Kevin Lamoureux	3,358	42.64	-7.50	$23,318.00
Progressive Conservative	George Sandhu	1,017	12.91	-2.88	$27,661.71
Total valid votes		7,876	100.00	–	
Rejected and declined ballots		50	0.63	0	
Turnout		7,926	72.27	+4.82	
Electors on the lists		10,967			
New Democratic gain from Liberal		Swing		+10.86	

1995 Manitoba general election
Party	Candidate	Votes	%	±%
Liberal	Kevin Lamoureux	4,394	50.80	+4.93
New Democratic	Poy Gomez	2,649	30.62	-2.96
Progressive Conservative	Scott Fielding	1,384	16.00	-2.03
Independent	Scott Kowall	223	2.58	n/a
Total valid votes		8,706	100.00	-
Rejected ballots		56	–	–
Turnout		8,650	67.03	
Eligible voters		12,989		
Source: Elections Manitoba

1990 Manitoba general election
Party	Candidate	Votes	%	±%
Liberal	Kevin Lamoureux	3,602	45.87	+4.37
New Democratic	Ajit Deol	2,637	33.58	-4.50
Progressive Conservative	Raj Mehta	1,416	18.03	-1.96
Western Independence	Gordon Haddad	198	2.52	n/a
Total valid votes		7,898	100.00	-
Rejected ballots		45	–	
Turnout		7,853	64.28	
Eligible voters		12,287		
Source: Elections Manitoba

1988 Manitoba general election
Party	Candidate	Votes	%	±%
Liberal	Kevin Lamoureux	4,466	41.50	+
New Democratic	Harry Daniels	4,098	38.08	-
Progressive Conservative	Bob Vandewater	2,151	19.99	+
Communist	Nancy Watkins	46	0.43	+
Total valid votes		10,825	100.00	-
Rejected ballots		17	–	–
Turnout		10,761	69.45	
Eligible voters		15,586		
Source: Elections Manitoba

== See also ==
- List of Manitoba provincial electoral districts
- Canadian provincial electoral districts
