= Progressive Party of Manitoba (1981–1995) =

Defunct political party in Canada

- Former provincial party
- Leader: Sidney Green
- Founded: 1981
- Dissolved: 1995
- Ideology: Progressivism; Agrarianism; Social Democracy

The Progressive Party of Manitoba was a political party in Manitoba, Canada which existed from 1981 to 1995. The party was created in March 1981 by five former members of the province's New Democratic Party: Sidney Green, Ben Hanuschak, Bud Boyce, Murdoch Mackay and Max Hofford. Green was acknowledged as the party's leader.

Despite its name, this party had no connection with the original Progressive Party of Manitoba, which was created in 1922 and governed the province from its founding until 1958 (after 1932 in an alliance with the Manitoba Liberal Party).

Green, Hanuschak and Boyce were members of the provincial legislature in 1981, having been elected as NDP candidates. All three had served as cabinet ministers in the government of Edward Schreyer (1969–1977).

The party was regarded as socialist, and promoted traditionally leftist policies such as full employment and increased profits taxation on resource industries. However, it was also influenced by ideas usually associated with the radical right.

Green had left the NDP in 1979. Green opposed what he described as "special privileges" for unions and minority groups, and was particularly opposed to the NDP's plans for anti-scab legislation. These views were reflected in Progressive Party policy.

The Progressives were the third-largest party in the provincial legislature (the Liberals having been reduced to one seat in 1977), and sought to run a full slate of candidates in 1981. They were unable to do this, however, and were unable to mount a successful challenge against the dominant NDP and Progressive Conservatives. All Progressive candidates were defeated, including the three incumbents; Green placed a poor third in Inkster, which he had represented since 1966.

The Progressive Party never recovered from this early loss. It ran twelve candidates in 1986 (including Green and Hanuschak), but all fared poorly. The party was reduced to six candidates in 1988, although it received some attention for featuring former premier Douglas Campbell (of the original Progressive Party) at one of its rallies. The Progressives ran five candidates in 1990, the minimum required for ballot status.

During its later years, the Progressive Party began veering further to the right. In 1990, its campaign literature emphasized balanced budgets, and rejected distinct status for minority groups.

Green, who remained the party's leader throughout all stages of its development, dissolved the Progressive Party on July 13, 1995 when his attempts to find a successor came to nothing.

== See also ==
- List of Canadian political parties
