= 41st Manitoba Legislature =

- Majority parliament
- Mar. 16, 2016 – Aug. 12, 2019

Parliament leaders
- Premier: Hon. Brian Pallister; May 3, 2016 — August 12, 2019
- Leader of the Opposition: Flor Marcelino; May 7, 2016 — September 16, 2017
- Wab Kinew; September 16, 2017 — August 12, 2019

Party caucuses
- Government: Progressive Conservative
- Opposition: New Democrat
- Recognized: Liberal
- Unrecognized: Manitoba

Legislative Assembly
- Speaker of the Assembly: Hon. Myrna Driedger; May 3, 2016 — August 12, 2019
- Government House leader: Hon. Kelvin Goertzen; May 3, 2016 — August 24, 2016
- Andrew Micklefield; August 24, 2016 — August 17, 2017
- Hon. Cliff Cullen; August 17, 2017 — August 12, 2019
- Opposition House leader: Jim Maloway; May 3, 2016 — September 21, 2017
- Nahanni Fontaine; September 21, 2017 — August 12, 2019
- Members: 57 MLA seats

Sovereign
- Monarch: Elizabeth II; 6 Feb. 1952 – 8 Sept. 2022
- Lieutenant governor: Hon. Janice Filmon

Sessions
- 1st session May 16, 2016 – November 10, 2016
- 2nd session November 21, 2016 – November 9, 2017
- 3rd session November 21, 2017 – November 8, 2018
- 4th session November 20, 2018 – June 3, 2019
← 40th	→ 42nd

The 41st Manitoba Legislature was created following a general election in 2016.

The Progressive Conservative Party led by Brian Pallister formed a majority government.

The Lieutenant Governor was Janice Filmon.

== Members of the 41st Legislative Assembly ==
Name	Party	Riding	First elected / previously elected	No.# of term(s)	Notes
Eileen Clarke	Progressive Conservative	Agassiz	2016	1st term	
Doyle Piwniuk	Progressive Conservative	Arthur-Virden	2014	2nd term	
Steven Fletcher	Progressive Conservative	Assiniboia	2016	1st term	PC until June 30, 2017, Independent until September 11, 2018
Steven Fletcher	Independent	Assiniboia	2016	1st term	PC until June 30, 2017, Independent until September 11, 2018
Steven Fletcher	Manitoba	Assiniboia	2016	1st term	PC until June 30, 2017, Independent until September 11, 2018
Len Isleifson	Progressive Conservative	Brandon East	2016	1st term	
Reg Helwer	Progressive Conservative	Brandon West	2011	2nd term	
Cindy Lamoureux	Liberal	Burrows	2016	1st term	
Myrna Driedger	Progressive Conservative	Charleswood	1998	6th term	
Matt Wiebe	New Democratic	Concordia	2010	3rd term	
Brad Michaleski	Progressive Conservative	Dauphin	2016	1st term	
Bob Lagassé	Progressive Conservative	Dawson Trail	2016	1st term	
Jim Maloway	New Democratic	Elmwood	1986, 2011	9th term*	
Cliff Graydon	Progressive Conservative	Emerson	2007	3rd term	PC until October 22, 2018
Cliff Graydon	Independent	Emerson	2007	3rd term	PC until October 22, 2018
Tom Lindsey	New Democratic	Flin Flon	2016	1st term	
James Allum	New Democratic	Fort Garry-Riverview	2011	2nd term	
Sarah Guillemard	Progressive Conservative	Fort Richmond	2016	1st term	
Wab Kinew	New Democratic	Fort Rouge	2016	1st term	
**Brian Pallister**	Progressive Conservative	Fort Whyte	1992, (Note: Portage la Prairie) 2012	4th term*	
Jeff Wharton	Progressive Conservative	Gimli	2016	1st term	
Derek Johnson	Progressive Conservative	Interlake	2016	1st term	
Judy Klassen	Liberal	Kewatinook	2016	1st term	
Nic Curry	Progressive Conservative	Kildonan	2016	1st term	
Scott Fielding	Progressive Conservative	Kirkfield Park	2016	1st term	
Dennis Smook	Progressive Conservative	La Verendrye	2011	2nd term	
Wayne Ewasko	Progressive Conservative	Lac Du Bonnet	2011	2nd term	
Ralph Eichler	Progressive Conservative	Lakeside	2003	4th term	
Flor Marcelino	New Democratic	Logan	2007	3rd term	
Blaine Pedersen	Progressive Conservative	Midland	2007	3rd term	
Andrew Swan	New Democratic	Minto	2004	4th term	
Cameron Friesen	Progressive Conservative	Morden-Winkler	2011	2nd term	
Shannon Martin	Progressive Conservative	Morris	2014	2nd term	
Kevin Chief	New Democratic	Point Douglas	2011	2nd term	Until January 9, 2017
Bernadette Smith (After June 13, 2017)	New Democratic	Point Douglas	2017	1st term	Elected in a by-election
Ian Wishart	Progressive Conservative	Portage la Prairie	2011	2nd term	
James Teitsma	Progressive Conservative	Radisson	2016	1st term	
Greg Nesbitt	Progressive Conservative	Riding Mountain	2016	1st term	
Rochelle Squires	Progressive Conservative	Riel	2016	1st term	
Cathy Cox	Progressive Conservative	River East	2016	1st term	
Jon Gerrard	Liberal	River Heights	1999	5th term	
Andrew Micklefield	Progressive Conservative	Rossmere	2016	1st term	
Janice Morley-Lecomte	Progressive Conservative	Seine River	2016	1st term	
Alan Lagimodiere	Progressive Conservative	Selkirk	2016	1st term	
Andrew Smith	Progressive Conservative	Southdale	2016	1st term	
Cliff Cullen	Progressive Conservative	Spruce Woods	2004	4th term	
Greg Selinger	New Democratic	St. Boniface	1999	5th term	Until March 7, 2018
Dougald Lamont (After July 17, 2018)	Liberal	St. Boniface	2018	1st term	Elected in a by-election
Scott Johnston	Progressive Conservative	St. James	2016	1st term	
Nahanni Fontaine	New Democratic	St. Johns	2016	1st term	
Jon Reyes	Progressive Conservative	St. Norbert	2016	1st term	
Ron Schuler	Progressive Conservative	St. Paul	1999	5th term	
Colleen Mayer	Progressive Conservative	St. Vital	2016	1st term	
Kelvin Goertzen	Progressive Conservative	Steinbach	2003	4th term	
Rick Wowchuk	Progressive Conservative	Swan River	2016	1st term	
Mohinder Saran	New Democratic	The Maples	2007	3rd term	NDP until January 31, 2017
Mohinder Saran	Independent	The Maples	2007	3rd term	NDP until January 31, 2017
Amanda Lathlin	New Democratic	The Pas	2015	2nd term	
Kelly Bindle	Progressive Conservative	Thompson	2016	1st term	
Blair Yakimoski	Progressive Conservative	Transcona	2016	1st term	
Heather Stefanson	Progressive Conservative	Tuxedo	2000	5th term	
Ted Marcelino	New Democratic	Tyndall Park	2011	2nd term	
Rob Altemeyer	New Democratic	Wolseley	2011	2nd term	

- Members in **bold** are in the Cabinet of Manitoba

^{†} Speaker of the Assembly

== Standings changes in the 41st Assembly ==
Number of members per party by date	2016	2017		2018			
Number of members per party by date	April 19	January 31	June 30	March 7	July 17	September 11	October 22
Progressive Conservative	40		39				38
NDP	14	13		12			
Liberal	3				4		
Manitoba	0					1	
Independent	0	1	2			1	2
Total members	57				56	57	
Vacant	0					1	0
Government Majority	23				22	23	22

Membership changes in the 41st Assembly
Date	Name	District	Party	Reason
April 19, 2016	See List of Members			Election day of the 41st Manitoba general election
January 31, 2017	Mohinder Saran	The Maples	New Democratic	Suspended from NDP caucus.
June 30, 2017	Steven Fletcher	Assinboia	Progressive Conservative	Expelled from PC caucus.
March 7, 2018	Greg Selinger	St. Boniface	New Democratic	Vacated seat.
July 17, 2018	Dougald Lamont	St. Boniface	Liberal	Elected in a by-election.
September 11, 2018	Steven Fletcher	Assinboia	Independent	Elected head as leader of Manitoba Party
October 22, 2018	Cliff Graydon	Emerson	Progressive Conservative	Expelled from PC caucus due to sexual allegations.

Source: "MLA Biographies - Living". Legislative Assembly of Manitoba. Archived from the original on 2014-03-30.

== See also ==
- 2011 Manitoba general election
- Legislative Assembly of Manitoba

== Notes ==
Preceded by 40th Assembly	Manitoba Legislative Assemblies; 2016–2019	Succeeded by 42nd Assembly
