= Manitoba Liberal Party candidates in the 2016 Manitoba provincial election =

This is a list of the Manitoba Liberal Party candidates in the 2016 provincial election. Some of the party's candidates have their own biography pages; information about others may be found here.

== Candidates ==
Riding	Candidate's Name	Notes	Residence	Occupation	Votes	%	Rank
Agassiz	No Candidate						
Arthur-Virden	No Candidate						
Assiniboia	Ian McCausland				1,631	20.75	3rd
Brandon East	Vanessa Hamilton	Brandon City Councillor	Brandon		830	11.80	3rd
Brandon West	Billy Moore				631	7.75	3rd
Burrows	Cindy Lamoureux	Daughter of federal MP Kevin Lamoureux.	Winnipeg		2,641	46.55	1st
Charleswood	Paul Brault				1187	13.59	2nd
Concordia	Donovan Martin				642	10.46	3rd
Dauphin	Garry Gurke				505	6.34	4th
Dawson Trail	Terry Hayward				1,652	20.21	3rd
Elmwood	Candidate Withdrew						
Emerson	Loren Braul				1,423	20.93	2nd
Flin Flon	Leslie Beck	Flin Flon City Councillor	Flin Flon		948	28.16	3rd
Fort Garry-Riverview	Johanna Wood				807	8.85	4th
Fort Richmond	Kyra Wilson				814	12.51	3rd
Fort Rouge	Rana Bokhari	Party leader			1,792	20.07	3rd
Fort Whyte	Peter Bastians				1,205	11.42	3rd
Gimli	No Candidate						
Interlake	Jamal Abas				2,068	28.80	2nd
Kewatinook	Judy Klassen				1,565	49.73	1st
Kildonan	Navdeep Khangura				974	11.70	3rd
Kirkfield Park	Kelly Nord				889	8.71	3rd
La Verendrye	Bill Paulishyn				696	9.42	4th
Lac du Bonnet	No Candidate						
Lakeside	No Candidate						
Logan	Peter Koroma				1,457	28.46	2nd
The Maples	Harbans Singh Brar				1,695	21.69	3rd
Midland	Julia Sisler				523	6.38	4th
Minto	Demetre Balaktsis				723	12.65	3rd
Morden-Winkler	Benjamin Bawdon				279	3.60	3rd
Morris	John Falk				1,430	15.46	2nd
The Pas	Tyler Duncan				586	12.90	3rd
Point Douglas	Althea Guiboche				956	19.47	2nd
Portage la Prairie	Stephen J. Prince				1,238	18.84	2nd
Radisson	Scott Newman				1,593	17.37	3rd
Riding Mountain	Jordan Fleury				1,028	13.32	2nd
Riel	Neil Johnston				1,627	16.52	3rd
River East	Piero Scaramuzzi				776	8.29	3rd
River Heights	Jon Gerrard	Former party leader			5,230	51.90	1st
Rossmere	Malli Aulakh				838	8.42	3rd
St. Boniface	Alain Landry				1,663	19.46	3rd
St. James	Michelle Finley				1,150	13.70	3rd
St. Johns	Noel Bernier				1,465	23.02	3rd
St. Norbert	James Bloomfield				1,251	13.66	3rd
St. Paul	Pete Sanderson				1,055	10.65	3rd
St. Vital	Bryan Van Wilgenburg				1,296	15.90	3rd
Seine River	Peter Chura		Winnipeg	television journalist	2,388	23.58	3rd
Selkirk	Stefan Jones				1,390	16.47	3rd
Southdale	Ryan Colyer				1,318	12.62	3rd
Steinbach	Dakota Young-Brown				461	5.89	2nd
Spruce Woods	Jaron Hart				512	7.19	4th
Swan River	Shayne Lynxleg				482	6.60	3rd
Thompson	Inez Vystrcil-Spence				638	16.46	3rd
Transcona	Chad Panting				1,465	18.05	3rd
Tuxedo	Micheal Lazar				1,251	14.54	3rd
Tyndall Park	Aida Champagne				1,656	30.15	2nd
Wolseley	Shandi Strong				653	8.87	4th

== Candidates in post-2016 By-elections ==
Riding	Candidate name	By-election date	Votes	%	Rank
Point Douglas	John Cacayuran	June 13, 2017	1,006	29.08	2nd
St. Boniface	Dougald Lamont	July 17, 2018	2,625	42.03	1st
