= 2019 Manitoba general election =

- September 10, 2019

57 seats of the Legislative Assembly of Manitoba 29 seats are needed for a majority
- Opinion polls
- Turnout: 55.04%
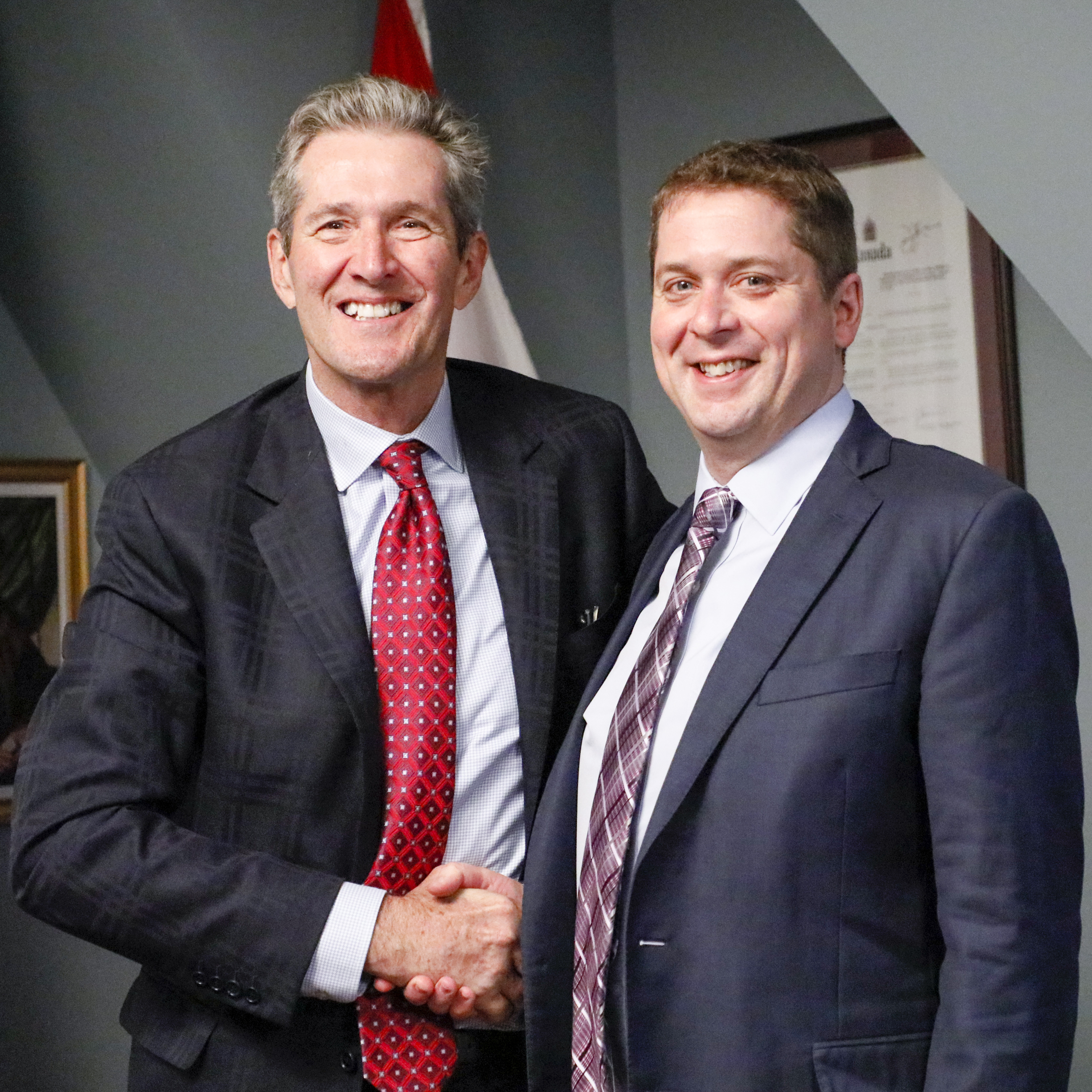

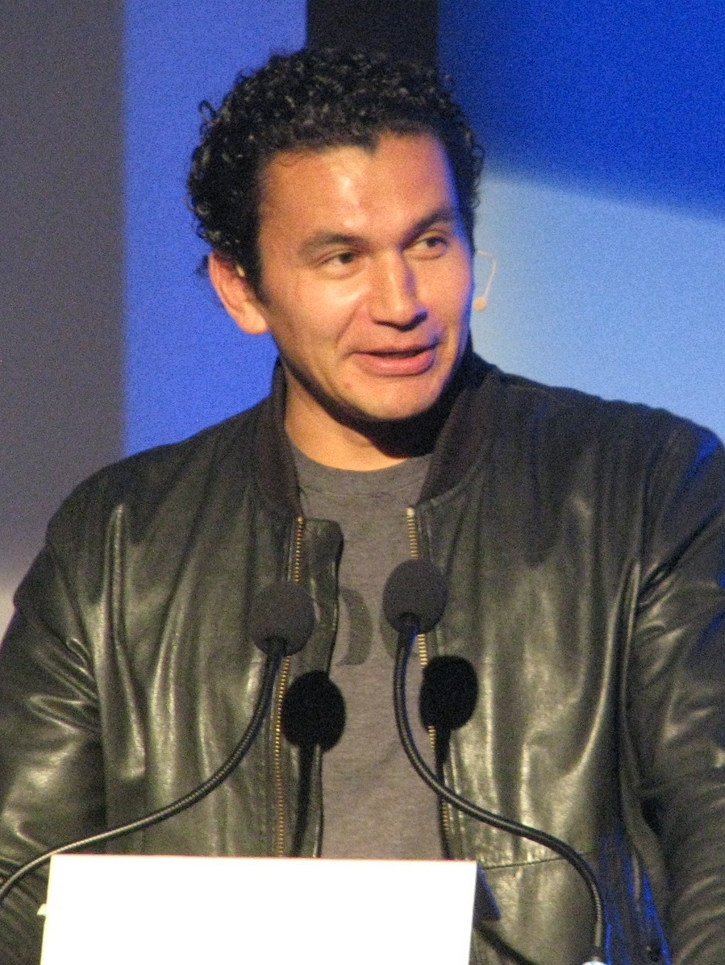

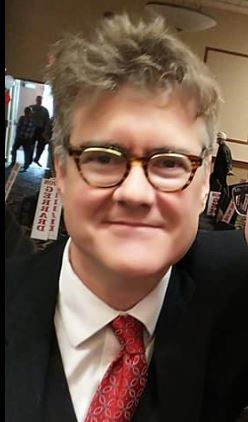

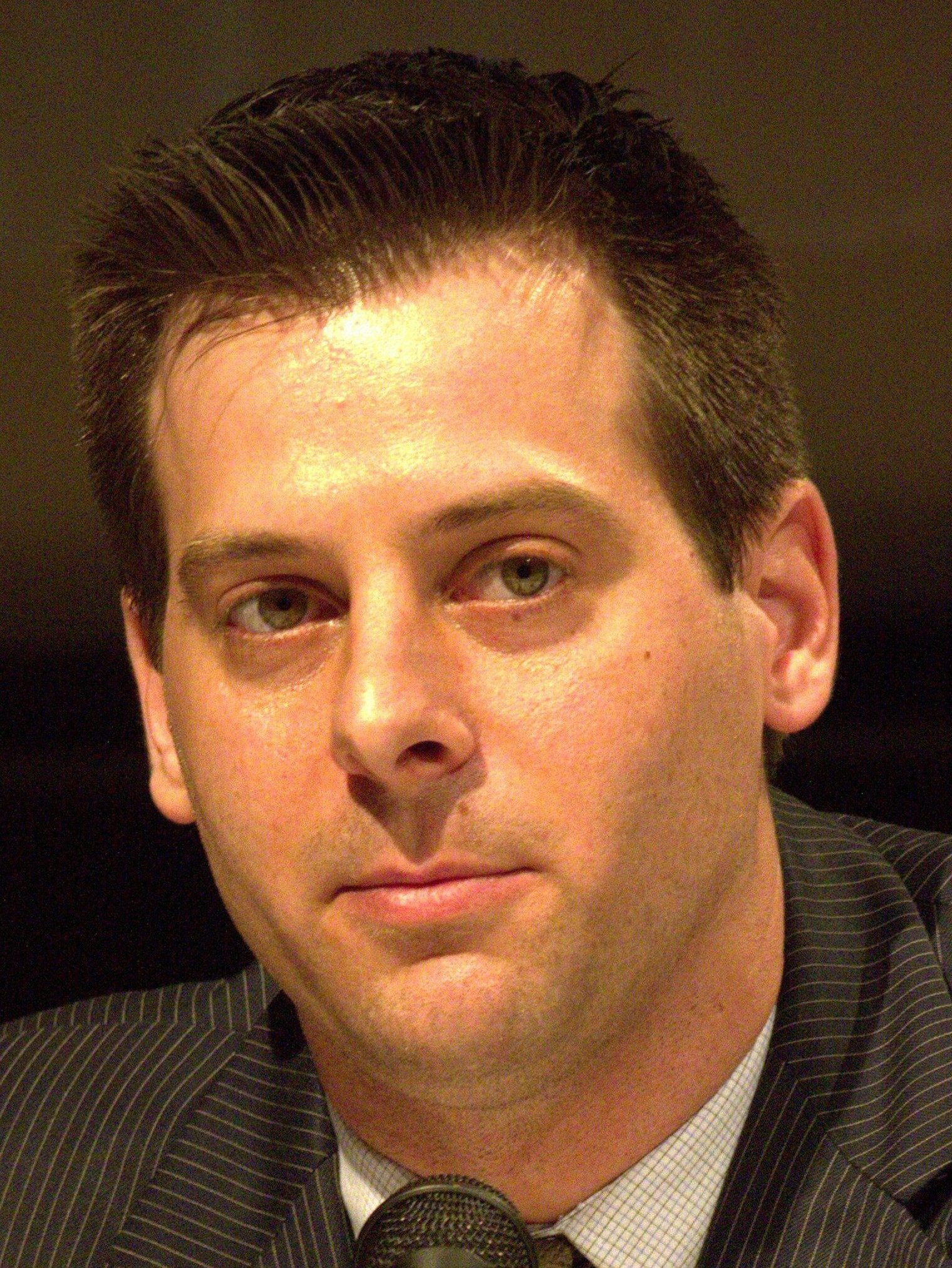
	First party	Second party
Leader	Brian Pallister	Wab Kinew
Party	Progressive Conservative	New Democratic
Leader since	July 30, 2012	September 16, 2017
Leader's seat	Fort Whyte	Fort Rouge
Last election	40 seats, 53.01%	14 seats, 25.73%
Seats before	38	12
Seats won	36	18
Seat change	▼2	▲6
Popular vote	222,569	150,016
Percentage	46.81%	31.55%
Swing	▼6.27%	▲5.77%
	Third party	Fourth party
Leader	Dougald Lamont	James Beddome
Party	Liberal	Green
Leader since	October 21, 2017	November 15, 2014
Leader's seat	St. Boniface	ran in Fort Rouge (lost)
Last election	3 seats, 14.46%	0 seats, 5.07%
Seats before	4	0
Seats won	3	0
Seat change	▼1	Steady
Popular vote	69,497	30,295
Percentage	14.62%	6.37%
Swing	▲0.22%	▲1.30%
- Popular vote by riding. As this is an FPTP election, seat totals are not determined by popular vote, but instead via results by each riding. Riding names are listed to the right.
Premier before election
Brian Pallister
Progressive Conservative
Premier after election
Brian Pallister
Progressive Conservative

The 2019 Manitoba general election was held on September 10, 2019, to elect the 57 members to the Legislative Assembly of Manitoba.

The incumbent Progressive Conservatives, led by Premier Brian Pallister, were re-elected to a second majority government with a loss of two seats. The NDP, led by Wab Kinew, gained six seats and retained their position as the official opposition. The Liberals, led by Dougald Lamont, won the remaining three seats.

== Background ==
Under Manitoba's Elections Act, a general election must be held no later than the first Tuesday of October in the fourth calendar year following the previous election. As the previous election was held in 2016, the latest possible date for the election was October 6, 2020, or if that would have overlapped with a federal election period, the latest possible date would be April 20, 2021.

However, incumbent Premier Brian Pallister announced instead in June 2019 that he would seek to hold the election over a year early, on September 10, 2019, in order to seek "a new mandate to keep moving Manitoba forward." Pallister visited Lieutenant Governor Janice Filmon on August 12 to officially drop the writ and begin the campaign period.

It had been speculated that Pallister would call an early election in order to take advantage of a large lead in opinion polls, and to get the vote out of the way before new and potentially unpopular budget cuts took effect. A poll taken by the Winnipeg Free Press found that while most respondents disagreed with the early election and agreed that Pallister had moved up the date for partisan reasons, such sentiments were unlikely to imperil Pallister's re-election.

== Reorganization of electoral divisions ==
In 2006, the Electoral Divisions Act was amended to provide for the creation of a permanent commission to determine any necessary redistribution of seats in the Legislative Assembly by the end of 2008, and then every tenth year thereafter. Its final report would take effect upon the dissolution of the relevant Legislature. Following a series of hearings and an interim report, the commission's final report was issued in December 2018, which provided for the following changes:

Abolished ridings	New ridings
New ridings
	Lagimodière (Note: from part of Southdale and small parts of Radisson, St. Vital, and Seine River)
	McPhillips (Note: from parts of St. Paul, The Maples, and Kildonan)
	Red River North (Note: from parts of Selkirk, St. Paul, and a small part of Lac du Bonnet)
	Springfield-Ritchot (Note: from parts of St. Paul, La Verendrye, Dawson Trail, and Morris)
	Waverley (Note: from parts of St. Norbert and Fort Whyte)
Abolished ridings
Morris (Note: parts going to Midland, La Verendrye and Springfield-Ritchot)	
St. Paul	
Merger of ridings
Gimli; Interlake	Interlake-Gimli
Seine River; St. Norbert	Seine River
Kildonan; River East	Kildonan-River East
Renaming of ridings
Arthur-Virden	Turtle Mountain
Charleswood	Roblin
Emerson	Borderland
Fort Garry-Riverview	Fort Garry
Logan	Union Station
Minto	Notre Dame
The Pas	The Pas-Kameesak

== Timeline ==
=== 2016 ===
- May 3: Government is sworn in
- May 7: Greg Selinger resigns as leader and Flor Marcelino becomes interim Leader of the New Democratic Party of Manitoba.
- September 24: Rana Bokhari resigns as Leader of the Manitoba Liberal Party.
- October 21: Judy Klassen becomes interim Leader of the Manitoba Liberal Party.

=== 2017 ===
- January 9: Kevin Chief resigns as NDP member of the Legislative Assembly of Manitoba for Point Douglas, causing a by-election.
- January 31: NDP MLA Mohinder Saran suspended from the caucus due to sexual harassment allegations.
- June 13: Bernadette Smith elected member of the Legislative Assembly of Manitoba for Point Douglas holding the seat for the NDP with a reduced majority.
- June 13: Judy Klassen resigns as interim leader to run for Leader of the Manitoba Liberal Party. Paul Brault becomes acting Leader of the Manitoba Liberal Party.
- June 30: Progressive Conservative MLA Steven Fletcher expelled from the caucus after breaking with the party on multiple issues.
- September 16: Wab Kinew elected Leader of the New Democratic Party of Manitoba.
- October 21: Dougald Lamont elected Leader of the Manitoba Liberal Party.

=== 2018 ===
- March 7: Greg Selinger resigns as NDP member of the Legislative Assembly of Manitoba for St. Boniface, causing a by-election.
- March 21: NDP MLA for Wolseley, Rob Altemeyer, announces that he will not seek re-election.
- July 17: Liberal leader Dougald Lamont elected member of the Legislative Assembly of Manitoba for St. Boniface, gaining the seat from the NDP and winning official party status for the Liberals.
- August 13: Steven Fletcher joins the Manitoba Party.
- September 11: Steven Fletcher becomes Leader of the Manitoba Party.
- October 22: Progressive Conservative MLA Cliff Graydon expelled from the caucus due to sexual harassment allegations.
- December 14: Final Report of the Manitoba Electoral Boundaries Commission released.
- December 14: NDP MLA for Fort Garry-Riverview, James Allum, announces that he will not seek re-election.

=== 2019 ===
- April 3: Progressive Conservative MLA for Kildonan, Nic Curry announces that he will not seek re-election.
- August 12: Premier Pallister visits the lieutenant governor and calls the election for September 10.
- September 10: The election is held.

=== Movement in seats held ===
41st Manitoba Legislature - Movement in seats held up to the election (2016-2019)
Party	2016	Gain/(loss) due to					2019
Party	2016	Resignation as MLA	Expulsion/ Suspension	Switching allegiance	Byelection gain	Byelection hold	2019
Progressive Conservative	40		(2)				38
New Democratic	14	(2)	(1)			1	12
Liberal	3				1		4
Manitoba First	–			1			1
Independent	–		3	(1)			2
Total	57	(2)	–	–	1	1	57

Changes in seats held (2016–2019)
Seat	Before				Change		
Seat	Date	Member	Party	Reason	Date	Member	Party
Point Douglas	January 9, 2017	Kevin Chief	█ New Democratic	Resignation	June 13, 2017	Bernadette Smith	█ New Democratic
The Maples	January 31, 2017	Mohinder Saran	█ New Democratic	Suspended from caucus			█ Independent
Assiniboia	June 30, 2017	Steven Fletcher	█ PC	Expelled from caucus			█ Independent
Assiniboia	September 11, 2018	Steven Fletcher	█ Independent	Becomes leader of new party			█ Manitoba First
St. Boniface	March 7, 2018	Greg Selinger	█ New Democratic	Resignation	July 17, 2018	Dougald Lamont	█ Liberal
Emerson	October 22, 2018	Cliff Graydon	█ PC	Expelled from caucus			█ Independent

=== Historical results from 1990 onwards ===
Graph of Manitoba general election results by share of votes, 1990–2019; omitted are minor parties consistently registering less than 2% of the vote. View source data.
Graph of Manitoba general election results by seats won, 1990–2019; those of independent MNAs are omitted. View source data.

== Campaign ==
Riding contests, by number of candidates (2019)
Candidates	PC	NDP	Lib	Grn	MFW	M1ST	Comm	Ind	Total
3	13	13	13						39
4	29	29	29	28	1				116
5	10	10	10	10	2	4	2	2	50
6	5	5	5	5	4	2	3	1	30
Total	57	57	57	43	7	6	5	3	235

=== Opinion polls ===
Polling firm	Last date of polling	Link	PC	NDP	Liberal	Green	Other
Forum Research	September 9, 2019		43	29	17	10	1
Research Co.	September 9, 2019		44	31	16	7	1
Mainstreet Research	September 4, 2019	(Note: Manitoba PC Government most likely outcomeMainstreet Research)	43.3	34.2	15.1	6.2	1.2
Research Co.	August 29, 2019		46	30	14	8	1
Probe Research Inc	August 24, 2019		40	29	18	10	3
Mainstreet Research	August 19, 2019		42.5	34.7	11.9	9.6	1.4
Converso	August 7, 2019		35.0	21.0	12.0	8.0	1.0
Probe Research Inc	June 17, 2019		42	26	16	14	3
Probe Research Inc	March 24, 2019	(Note: http://www.probe-research.com/documents/190402%20March%202019%20MB%20Omni%20Prov%20Party%20Standings.pdf)	42	30	18	7	
Mainstreet Research	March 24, 2019		44.8	32.1	13.1	6.7	3.3
Mainstreet Research	January 16, 2019		44.6	28.0	16.8	4.6	6.0
Probe Research Inc	December 6, 2018	(Note: "Archived copy" (PDF). Archived from the original (PDF) on December 28, 2018.)	44	27	21	5	3
Mainstreet Research	November 5, 2018		42.3	28.7	18.1	6.0	4.9
Probe Research Inc	September 28, 2018	(Note: "Archived copy" (PDF). Archived from the original (PDF) on November 4, 2018.)	44	25	20	8	
Mainstreet Research	July 17, 2018		44.9	29.3	13.6	8.7	3.4
Probe Research Inc	June 19, 2018	(Note: "Archived copy" (PDF). Archived from the original (PDF) on November 4, 2018.)	42	30	16	11	
Mainstreet Research	April 18, 2018		45.6	30.2	13.0	7.8	
Probe Research Inc	April 13, 2018	(Note: "Archived copy" (PDF). Archived from the original (PDF) on April 23, 2018.)	44	28	19	8	
Mainstreet Research	January 6, 2018		39.6	36.7	13.3	10.4	
Probe Research Inc	December 14, 2017	(Note: "Archived copy" (PDF). Archived from the original (PDF) on December 29, 2017.)	40	26	25	8	
Probe Research Inc	October 10, 2017		36	30	24	8	
Probe Research Inc	June 18, 2017		42	30	20	7	
Mainstreet Research	April 7, 2017		47	23	19	11	
Probe Research Inc	March 28, 2017		43	27	20	8	
Probe Research Inc	December 12, 2016	(Note: "Archived copy" (PDF). Archived from the original (PDF) on January 1, 2017.)	49	24	19	8	
Probe Research Inc	September 26, 2016	(Note: "Archived copy" (PDF). Archived from the original (PDF) on January 1, 2017.)	48	20	26	5	
Probe Research Inc	June 16, 2016	(Note: "Archived copy" (PDF). Archived from the original (PDF) on January 1, 2017.)	46	27	18	8	
2016 election	April 19, 2016		53.0	25.7	14.5	5.1	1.7
Polling firm	Last date of polling	Link					Other
Polling firm	Last date of polling	Link	PC	NDP	Liberal	Green	Other

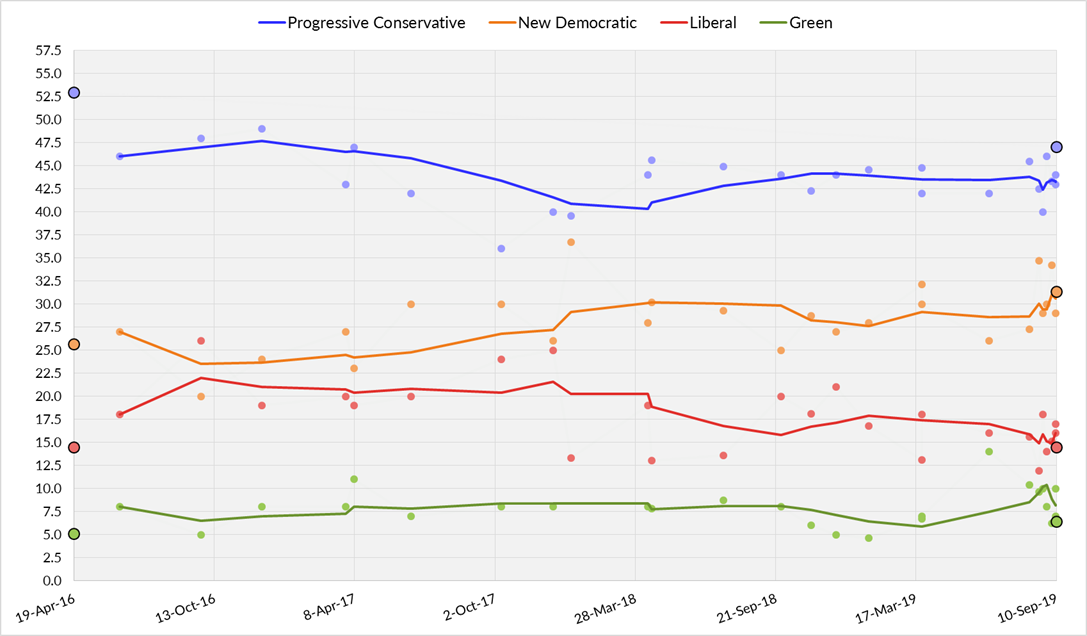
Progressive Conservative NDP Liberal Green

== Results ==
Elections to the 42nd Manitoba Legislature
Party	Leader	Candidates	Seats				Popular vote		
Party	Leader	Candidates	2016	Dissolution	2019	+/-	Votes	%	+/-
Progressive Conservative	Brian Pallister	57	40	38	36	-4	222,569	46.81	-6.27
New Democratic	Wab Kinew	57	14	12	18	+4	150,016	31.55	+5.77
Liberal	Dougald Lamont	57	3	4	3	–	69,497	14.62	+0.22
Green	James Beddome	43	–	–	–	–	30,295	6.37	+1.30
Manitoba Forward	Wayne Sturby	7	–	–	–	–	1,339	0.28	
Manitoba First (Note: Party name changed from Manitoba Party in 2019.)	Douglas Petrick	6	–	1	–	–	647	0.14	-0.98
Communist	Darrell Rankin	5	–	–	–	–	214	0.05	-0.02
Independents		3	–	2	–	–	854	0.18	-0.29
Vacant				0		–			
Valid votes							478,926	99.27	
Blank and invalid votes							3,495	0.73	
**Total**		235	**57**	**57**	**57**		**482,421**	**100**	
Registered voters/turnout							870,137	55.44	

=== Vote and seat summaries ===
Ternary plots – shift of electoral support (2016–2019)
2016

2019
Electoral districts identified by colours of winning parties

Popular vote
PC	46.81%
New Democratic	31.55%
Liberal	14.62%
Green	6.37%
Others	0.64%

Seat summary
PC	63.16%
New Democratic	31.58%
Liberal	5.26%

=== Results by riding ===
- Note that names in **bold** type represent Cabinet members, while italics represent party leaders.

==== Northern Manitoba ====
Electoral district	Candidates				Incumbent
Electoral district	PC	NDP	Liberal	Green	Incumbent
Flin Flon	Theresa Wride; 1,294 - 30.7%	Tom Lindsey; 2,435 - 57.8%	James Lindsay; 270 - 6.6%	Saara Murnick; 203 - 4.8%	Tom Lindsey
Keewatinook	Arnold Flett; 355 - 13.6%	Ian Bushie; 1,723 - 66.1%	Jason Harper; 530 - 20.3%		Judy Klassen
Swan River	Rick Wowchuk; 5,529 - 69.0%	Shelley Wiggins; 2,064 - 25.8%	David Teffaine; 417 - 5.2%		Rick Wowchuk
The Pas-Kameesak	Ron Evans; 1,324 - 24.8%	Amanda Lathlin; 3,054 - 57.2%	Ken Brandt; 178 - 3.3%	Ralph McLean; 780 - 14.6%	Amanda Lathlin; The Pas
Thompson	Kelly Bindle; 1,750 - 35.9%	Danielle Adams; 2,651 - 54.4%	Darla Contois; 177 - 3.6%	Meagan Jemmett; 294 - 6.0%	Kelly Bindle

==== Westman/Parkland ====
Electoral district	Candidates				Incumbent
Electoral district	PC	NDP	Liberal	Green	Incumbent
Agassiz	Eileen Clarke; 5,688 - 75.6%	Kelly Legaspi; 954 - 12.7%	Hector Swanson; 462 - 6.1%	Liz Clayton; 417 - 5.5%	Eileen Clarke
Turtle Mountain	Doyle Piwniuk; 6,202 - 67.5%	Angie Herrera-Hildebrand; 1,003 - 10.9%	Richard Davies; 623 - 6.8%	David M. Neufeld; 1,356 - 14.8%	Doyle Piwniuk; Arthur-Virden
Brandon East	Len Isleifson; 3,272 - 51.3%	Lonnie Patterson; 2,311 - 36.2%	Kim Longstreet; 799 - 12.5%		Len Isleifson
Brandon West	Reg Helwer; 4,307 - 58.5%	Nick Brown; 1,747 - 23.7%	Sunday Frangi; 564 - 7.7%	Robert Brown; 744 - 10.1%	Reg Helwer
Dauphin	Brad Michaleski; 4,799 - 50.5%	Darcy Scheller; 4,022 - 42.4%	Cathy Scofield-Singh; 674 - 7.1%		Brad Michaleski
Riding Mountain	Greg Nesbitt; 6,117 - 66.1%	Wayne Chacun; 1,961 - 21.2%	Jordan Fleury; 454 - 4.9%	Mary Lowe; 723 - 7.8%	Greg Nesbitt
Spruce Woods	Cliff Cullen; 5,657 - 68.1%	Justin Shannon; 1,316 - 15.8%	Jennifer Harcus; 515 - 6.2%	Gordon Beddome; 816 - 9.8%	Cliff Cullen

==== Central Manitoba ====
Electoral district	Candidates					Incumbent
Electoral district	PC	NDP	Liberal	Green	Independent	Incumbent
Borderland	Josh Guenter; 4,885 - 66.1%	Liz Cronk; 287 - 3.9%	Loren Braul; 1,226 - 16.6%	Ken Henry; 250 - 3.4%	Cliff Graydon; 739 - 10.0%	Cliff Graydon; Emerson
Interlake-Gimli	Derek Johnson; 6,199 - 58.8%	Sarah Pinsent; 3,472 - 32.9%	Mary Lou Bourgeois; 400 - 3.8%	Dwight Harfield; 473 - 4.5%		Jeff Wharton‡ Gimli
Interlake-Gimli	Derek Johnson; 6,199 - 58.8%	Sarah Pinsent; 3,472 - 32.9%	Mary Lou Bourgeois; 400 - 3.8%	Dwight Harfield; 473 - 4.5%		Merged District
Interlake-Gimli	Derek Johnson; 6,199 - 58.8%	Sarah Pinsent; 3,472 - 32.9%	Mary Lou Bourgeois; 400 - 3.8%	Dwight Harfield; 473 - 4.5%		Derek Johnson; Interlake
Lakeside	Ralph Eichler; 6,394 - 68.7%	Dan Rugg; 2,054 - 22.1%	Ilsa Regelsky; 854 - 9.2%			Ralph Eichler
Midland	Blaine Pedersen; 6,700 - 75.0%	Cindy Friesen; 1,370 - 15.3%	Julia Sisler; 860 - 9.6%			Blaine Pedersen
Morden-Winkler	Cameron Friesen; 6,096 - 81.2%	Robin Dalloo; 365 - 4.9%	David Mintz; 277 - 3.7%	Mike Urichuk; 769 - 10.2%		Cameron Friesen
Springfield-Ritchot	Ron Schuler; 5,661 - 59.5%	Obasesam Okoi; 1,976 - 20.8%	Sara Mirwaldt; 813 - 8.5%	Garrett Hawgood; 1,065 - 11.2%		Shannon Martin; Morris
Portage la Prairie	Ian Wishart; 4,489 - 65.5%	Andrew Podolecki; 1,521 - 22.2%	Charles Huband; 843 - 12.3%			Ian Wishart

==== Eastman ====
Electoral district	Candidates					Incumbent
Electoral district	PC	NDP	Liberal	Green	Manitoba First	Incumbent
Dawson Trail	Bob Lagassé; 4,548 - 55.4%	Echo Asher; 1,783 - 21.7%	Robert Rivard; 1,874 - 22.8%			Bob Lagassé
Lac du Bonnet	Wayne Ewasko; 6,170 - 66.1%	Sidney Klassen; 1,793 - 19.2%	Terry Hayward; 1,373 - 14.7%			Wayne Ewasko
La Verendrye	Dennis Smook; 5,305 - 72.8%	Erin McGee; 1,052 - 14.4%	Lorena Mitchell; 929 - 12.8%			Dennis Smook
Steinbach	Kelvin Goertzen; 6,237 - 81.7%	Rob Jessup; 614 - 8.0%	LeAmber Kensley; 369 - 4.8%	Janine Gibson; 417 - 5.5%		Kelvin Goertzen
Red River North	Jeff Wharton; 5,566 - 58.0%	Chris Pullen; 2,387 - 24.9%	Noel Ngo; 732 - 7.6%	Graham Hnatiuk; 739 - 7.7%	Jocelyn Burzuik; 173 - 1.8%	Ron Schuler; St. Paul
Selkirk	Alan Lagimodiere; 4,736 - 51.4%	Mitch Obach; 3,319 - 35.8%	Philip Olcen; 480 - 5.2%	Tony Hill; 713 - 7.7%		Alan Lagimodiere

==== Northwest Winnipeg ====
Electoral district	Candidates					Incumbent
Electoral district	PC	NDP	Liberal	Green	Other	Incumbent
Burrows	Jasmine Brar; 1,680 - 26.2%	Diljeet Brar; 2,536 - 39.6%	Sarbjit Singh Gill; 1,170 - 18.3%		Edda Pangilinan (MB Fwd.); 1,020 - 15.9%	Cindy Lamoureux‡
Kildonan-River East	Cathy Cox; 5,514 - 51.1%	Elliot Macdonald; 3,673 - 34.0%	Kathryn Braun; 1,602 - 14.8%			Nic Curry; Kildonan
Kildonan-River East	Cathy Cox; 5,514 - 51.1%	Elliot Macdonald; 3,673 - 34.0%	Kathryn Braun; 1,602 - 14.8%			Merged District
Kildonan-River East	Cathy Cox; 5,514 - 51.1%	Elliot Macdonald; 3,673 - 34.0%	Kathryn Braun; 1,602 - 14.8%			Cathy Cox; River East
McPhillips	Shannon Martin; 3,307 - 38.3%	Greg McFarlane; 3,202 - 37.1%	John Cacayuran; 1,476 - 17.1%	Jason Smith; 406 - 4.7%	Dave Wheeler (MF); 237 - 2.7%	New Riding
Point Douglas	Michelle Redmond; 757 - 15.7%	Bernadette Smith; 3,002 - 62.1%	Richard Sanderson; 565 - 11.7%	Jenn Kess; 398 - 8.2%	Fagie Fainman (CPC-M); 44 - 1.4% Michael Wenuik (MB Fwd.); 66 - 0.9%	Bernadette Smith
St. Johns	Ray Larkin; 1,665 - 24.2%	Nahanni Fontaine; 3,526 - 51.2%	Eddie Calisto-Tavares; 1,092 - 15.9%	Joshua McNeil; 601 - 8.7%		Nahanni Fontaine
The Maples	Aman Sandhu; 1,824 - 25.9%	Mintu Sandhu; 2,744 - 39.0%	Amandeep Brar; 2,070 - 29.4%	Kiran Gill; 405 - 5.8%		Mohinder Saran
Tyndall Park	Daljit Kainth; 991 - 12.5%	Ted Marcelino; 2,447 - 30.9%	Cindy Lamoureux; 4,293 - 54.3%	Fleur Mann; 154 - 1.9%	Frank Komarniski (CPC-M); 22 - 0.3%	Ted Marcelino

==== Northeast Winnipeg ====
Electoral district	Candidates					Incumbent
Electoral district	PC	NDP	Liberal	Green	Other	Incumbent
Concordia	Andrew Frank; 2,290 - 31.9%	Matt Wiebe; 4,284 - 59.7%	Maria Albo; 605 - 8.4%			Matt Wiebe
Elmwood	Mayra Dubon; 2,533 - 31.9%	Jim Maloway; 3,862 - 48.6%	Regan Wolfrom; 739 - 9.3%	Nicolas Geddert; 763 - 9.6%	German Lombana (CPC-M); 45 - 0.6%	Jim Maloway
Radisson	James Teitsma; 4,523 - 47.0%	Raj Sandhu; 3,534 - 36.7%	Tanya Hansen Pratt; 997 - 10.4%	Carlianne Runions; 576 - 6.0%		James Teitsma
Rossmere	Andrew Micklefield; 4,362 - 47.0%	Andy Regier; 3,608 - 38.8%	Isaiah Oyeleru; 707 - 7.6%	Amanda Bazan; 613 - 6.6%		Andrew Micklefield
St. Boniface	Megan Hoskins; 1,889 - 19.2%	Laurissa Sims; 2,939 - 29.9%	Dougald Lamont; 4,077 - 41.5%	Jaclyn Jeanson; 840 - 8.6%	Simone Fortier (MB Fwd.); 76 - 0.8%	Dougald Lamont
Transcona	Blair Yakimoski; 3,914 - 45.1%	Nello Altomare; 4,029 - 46.4%	Dylan Bekkering; 716 - 8.4%			Blair Yakimoski

==== West Winnipeg ====
Electoral district	Candidates					Incumbent
Electoral district	PC	NDP	Liberal	Green	Manitoba First	Incumbent
Assiniboia	Scott Johnston; 4,102 - 44.2%	Joe McKellep; 3,303 - 35.6%	Jeff Anderson; 1,224 - 13.4%	John Delaat; 631 - 6.8%		Steven Fletcher
Roblin	Myrna Driedger; 6,075 - 55.7%	Sophie Brandt-Murenzi; 1,886 - 17.3%	Michael Bazak; 1,728 - 15.9%	Kevin Nichols; 1,209 - 11.1%		Myrna Driedger; Charleswood
Kirkfield Park	Scott Fielding; 5,435 - 50.3%	Kurt Morton; 2,767 - 25.6%	Ernie Nathaniel; 1,695 - 15.7%	Dennis Bayomi; 901 - 8.3%		Scott Fielding
St. James	Michelle Richard; 2,767 - 32.4%	Adrien Sala; 4,009 - 46.9%	Bernd Hohne; 965 - 11.3%	Jeff Buhse; 805 - 9.4%		Scott Johnston‡
Tuxedo	Heather Stefanson; 4,587 - 47.7%	Carla Compton; 1,919 - 20.0%	Marc Brandson; 2,225 - 23.1%	Kristin Lauhn-Jensen; 822 - 8.6%	Abby Al-Sahi; 60 - 0.6%	Heather Stefanson

==== Central Winnipeg ====
Electoral district	Candidates					Incumbent
Electoral district	PC	NDP	Liberal	Green	Other	Incumbent
Fort Garry	Nancy Cooke; 2,998 - 31.8%	Mark Wasyliw; 3,994 - 42.4%	Craig Larkins; 1,716 - 18.2%	Casey Fennessy; 722 - 7.7%		James Allum; Fort Garry-Riverview
Fort Rouge	Edna Nabess; 1,854 - 18.9%	Wab Kinew; 5,031 - 51.2%	Cyndy Friesen; 1,285 - 13.1%	James Beddome; 1,579 - 16.1%	Michael McCracken (MF); 54 - 0.5% Bradley Hebert (MB Fwd.); 29 - 0.3%	Wab Kinew
Notre Dame	Marsha Street; 789 - 15.2%	Malaya Marcelino; 3,361 - 64.9%	Donovan Martin; 702 - 13.6%	Martha Jo Willard; 263 - 5.1%	Andrew Taylor (CPC-M); 32 - 0.6% Margaret Sturby (MB Fwd.); 28 - 0.5%	Andrew Swan; Minto
River Heights	Susan Boulter; 2,276 - 24.4%	Jonathan Niemczak; 1,346 - 14.4%	Jon Gerrard; 5,038 - 54.0%	Nathan Zahn; 661 - 7.1%		Jon Gerrard
Union Station	Tara Fawcett; 908 - 18.0%	Uzoma Asagwara; 2,635 - 52.2%	Harold Davis; 949 - 18.8%	Andrea Shalay; 473 - 9.4%	Elsa Cubas (CPC-M); 48 - 1.0% James Yau (MB Fwd.); 32 - 0.6%	Flor Marcelino; Logan
Wolseley	Elizabeth Hildebrand; 831 - 8.9%	Lisa Naylor; 4,253 - 45.6%	Shandi Strong; 770 - 8.3%	David Nickarz; 3,336 - 35.8%	Eddie Hendrickson (Ind.); 129 - 1.4%	Rob Altemeyer

==== South Winnipeg ====
Electoral district	Candidates					Incumbent
Electoral district	PC	NDP	Liberal	Green	Other	Incumbent
Fort Richmond	Sarah Guillemard; 3,241 - 42.2%	George Wong; 1,701 - 22.1%	Tanjit Nagra; 2,361 - 30.7%	Cameron Proulx; 379 - 4.9%		Sarah Guillemard
Fort Whyte	Brian Pallister; 5,609 - 57.2%	Beatrice Bruske; 1,755 - 17.9%	Darrel Morin; 1,729 - 17.6%	Sara Campbell; 665 - 6.8%	Jason Holenski (MF); 54 - 0.6%	Brian Pallister
Lagimodière	Andrew Smith; 5,182 - 51.8%	Billie Cross; 2,789 - 27.9%	Jake Sacher; 1,481 - 14.8%	Bob Krul; 557 - 5.6%		New Riding
Riel	Rochelle Squires; 4,472 - 44.9%	Mike Moyes; 3,554 - 35.7%	Neil Johnston; 1,352 - 13.6%	Roger Schellenberg; 591 - 5.9%		Rochelle Squires
Seine River	Janice Morley-Lecomte; 4,363 - 45.1%	Durdana Islam; 2,513 - 26.0%	James Bloomfield; 2,147 - 22.2%	Bryanne Lamoureux; 658 - 6.8%		Janice Morley-Lecomte
Southdale	Audrey Gordon; 4,486 - 42.7%	Karen Myshkowsky; 3,955 - 37.6%	Spencer Duncanson; 1,422 - 13.5%	Katherine Quinton; 584 - 5.6%	Robert Cairns (MB Fwd.); 70 - 0.7%	Andrew Smith‡
St. Vital	Colleen Mayer; 3,211 - 35.0%	Jamie Moses; 4,081 - 44.4%	Jeffrey Anderson; 1,271 - 13.8%	Elizabeth Dickson; 499 - 5.4%	David Sutherland (MF); 60 - 0.7% Baljeet Sharma (Ind.); 62 - 0.7%	Colleen Mayer
Waverley	Jon Reyes; 3,265 - 50.0%	Dashi Zargani; 1,865 - 28.6%	Fiona Haftani; 1,070 - 16.4%	James Ducas; 325 - 5.0%		Jon Reyes; St. Norbert

=== Synopsis of results ===
2019 Manitoba general election – synopsis of riding results
Electoral division	2016 (Redist)	Winning party						Votes (Note: All parties with more than 1% of the vote are shown individually. Independent candidates and other minor parties are aggregated separately.)						
Electoral division	2016 (Redist)	1st place	Votes	Share	Margin #	Margin %	2nd place	PC	NDP	Lib	Grn	Ind	Other	Total
Agassiz	PC	PC	5,700	75.53%	4,736	62.75%	NDP	5,700	964	463	420	–	–	7,547
Assiniboia	PC	PC	4,108	44.25%	816	8.79%	NDP	4,108	3,292	1,247	636	–	–	9,283
Borderland	PC	PC	4,886	66.09%	3,660	49.51%	Lib	4,886	291	1,226	250	740	–	7,393
Brandon East	PC	PC	3,294	51.00%	947	14.66%	NDP	3,294	2,347	818	–	–	–	6,459
Brandon West	PC	PC	4,311	58.39%	2,554	34.59%	NDP	4,311	1,757	567	748	–	–	7,383
Burrows	Lib	NDP	2,555	39.70%	874	13.58%	PC	1,681	2,555	1,178	–	–	1,022	6,436
Concordia	NDP	NDP	4,305	59.69%	2,010	27.87%	PC	2,295	4,305	612	–	–	–	7,212
Dauphin	PC	PC	4,805	50.52%	773	8.13%	NDP	4,805	4,032	675	–	–	–	9,512
Dawson Trail	PC	PC	4,555	55.41%	2,675	32.54%	Lib	4,555	1,785	1,880	–	–	–	8,220
Elmwood	NDP	NDP	3,886	48.68%	1,346	16.86%	PC	2,540	3,886	746	765	–	45	7,982
Flin Flon	NDP	NDP	3,173	63.19%	1,816	36.17%	PC	1,357	3,173	299	192	–	–	5,021
Fort Garry	PC	NDP	4,003	42.35%	996	10.54%	PC	3,007	4,003	1,719	723	–	–	9,452
Fort Richmond	PC	PC	3,242	42.15%	879	11.43%	Lib	3,242	1,708	2,363	379	–	–	7,692
Fort Rouge	NDP	NDP	5,055	51.24%	3,198	32.41%	PC	1,857	5,055	1,290	1,580	–	84	9,866
Fort Whyte	PC	PC	5,619	57.19%	3,862	39.30%	NDP	5,619	1,757	1,731	665	–	54	9,826
Interlake-Gimli	PC	PC	6,165	58.62%	2,687	25.55%	NDP	6,165	3,478	400	473	–	–	10,516
Keewatinook	Lib	NDP	1,932	67.08%	1,397	48.51%	Lib	413	1,932	535	–	–	–	2,880
Kildonan-River East	PC	PC	5,523	51.10%	1,844	17.06%	NDP	5,523	3,679	1,607	–	–	–	10,809
Kirkfield Park	PC	PC	5,445	50.36%	2,668	24.67%	NDP	5,445	2,777	1,695	896	–	–	10,813
La Vérendrye	PC	PC	5,310	72.79%	4,264	58.45%	NDP	5,310	1,046	939	–	–	–	7,295
Lac du Bonnet	PC	PC	6,177	65.91%	4,363	46.55%	NDP	6,177	1,814	1,381	–	–	–	9,372
Lagimodière	PC	PC	5,187	51.78%	2,395	23.91%	NDP	5,187	2,792	1,481	557	–	–	10,017
Lakeside	PC	PC	6,409	68.24%	4,320	46.00%	NDP	6,409	2,089	894	–	–	–	9,392
McPhillips	PC	PC	3,359	38.19%	88	1.00%	NDP	3,359	3,271	1,506	414	–	245	8,795
Midland	PC	PC	6,706	75.01%	5,334	59.66%	NDP	6,706	1,372	862	–	–	–	8,940
Morden-Winkler	PC	PC	6,109	80.86%	5,305	70.22%	Green	6,109	365	277	804	–	–	7,555
Notre Dame	NDP	NDP	3,420	65.01%	2,626	49.91%	PC	794	3,420	719	267	–	61	5,261
Point Douglas	NDP	NDP	3,136	62.35%	2,373	47.18%	PC	763	3,136	594	414	–	123	5,030
Portage la Prairie	PC	PC	4,502	65.67%	2,994	43.68%	NDP	4,502	1,508	845	–	–	–	6,855
Radisson	PC	PC	4,527	46.97%	989	10.26%	NDP	4,527	3,538	1,002	572	–	–	9,639
Red River North	PC	PC	5,569	57.97%	3,180	33.10%	NDP	5,569	2,389	735	740	–	173	9,606
Riding Mountain	PC	PC	6,126	65.91%	4,156	44.72%	NDP	6,126	1,970	472	726	–	–	9,294
Riel	PC	PC	4,734	44.75%	990	9.36%	NDP	4,734	3,744	1,471	630	–	–	10,579
River Heights	Lib	Lib	5,884	53.79%	3,182	29.09%	PC	2,702	1,595	5,884	757	–	–	10,938
Roblin	PC	PC	6,203	55.19%	4,180	37.19%	NDP	6,203	2,023	1,775	1,238	–	–	11,239
Rossmere	PC	PC	4,369	46.91%	751	8.06%	NDP	4,369	3,618	711	615	–	–	9,313
Seine River	PC	PC	4,372	45.04%	1,847	19.03%	NDP	4,372	2,525	2,151	659	–	–	9,707
Selkirk	PC	PC	4,872	51.84%	1,543	16.42%	NDP	4,872	3,329	482	716	–	–	9,399
Southdale	PC	PC	4,493	42.40%	483	4.56%	NDP	4,493	4,010	1,427	595	–	71	10,596
Springfield-Ritchot	PC	PC	5,670	59.48%	3,688	38.69%	NDP	5,670	1,982	814	1,066	–	–	9,532
Spruce Woods	PC	PC	5,665	68.06%	4,344	52.19%	NDP	5,665	1,321	517	820	–	–	8,323
St. Boniface	NDP	Lib	4,152	41.69%	1,177	11.82%	NDP	1,907	2,975	4,152	845	–	81	9,960
St. James	PC	NDP	4,002	47.25%	1,221	14.42%	PC	2,781	4,002	880	806	–	–	8,469
St. Johns	NDP	NDP	3,548	51.88%	1,874	27.40%	PC	1,674	3,548	1,111	506	–	–	6,839
St. Vital	PC	NDP	4,092	44.47%	881	9.58%	PC	3,211	4,092	1,274	502	62	60	9,201
Steinbach	PC	PC	6,241	81.64%	5,625	73.58%	NDP	6,241	616	370	418	–	–	7,645
Swan River	PC	PC	5,546	68.87%	3,462	42.99%	NDP	5,546	2,084	423	–	–	–	8,053
The Maples	NDP	NDP	2,792	39.51%	689	9.75%	Lib	1,883	2,792	2,103	289	–	–	7,067
The Pas-Kameesak	NDP	NDP	3,180	57.90%	1,844	33.58%	PC	1,336	3,180	186	790	–	–	5,492
Thompson	PC	NDP	2,686	54.55%	929	18.87%	PC	1,757	2,686	183	298	–	–	4,924
Transcona	PC	NDP	4,030	46.42%	112	1.29%	PC	3,918	4,030	734	–	–	–	8,682
Turtle Mountain	PC	PC	6,210	67.48%	4,838	52.57%	Green	6,210	1,003	618	1,372	–	–	9,203
Tuxedo	PC	PC	4,645	47.85%	2,358	24.29%	Lib	4,645	1,921	2,287	793	–	61	9,707
Tyndall Park	NDP	Lib	4,301	54.67%	1,898	24.13%	NDP	984	2,403	4,301	157	–	22	7,867
Union Station	NDP	NDP	2,913	52.62%	1,876	33.89%	Lib	950	2,913	1,037	538	–	98	5,536
Waverley	PC	PC	3,267	50.05%	1,400	21.45%	NDP	3,267	1,867	1,070	324	–	–	6,528
Wolseley	NDP	NDP	4,271	46.03%	931	10.03%	Green	838	4,271	778	3,340	52	–	9,279

= new ridings
= open seat
= winning candidate was in previous Legislature
= incumbent had switched allegiance
= previously incumbent in another riding
= incumbency arose from a byelection gain
= not incumbent; was previously elected to the Legislature
= other incumbents renominated
= previously an MP in the House of Commons of Canada
= multiple candidates

=== Turnout, winning shares and swings ===
Summary of riding results by turnout, vote share for winning candidate, and swing (vs 2016)
Riding and winning party (Note: using 2016 redistribution data from CBC)			Turnout (Note: using 2016 base data from Elections Manitoba)		Vote share (Note: Share won by winning candidate, with difference noted from share achieved by the same party in 2011.)		Swing (Note: Positive indicates improvement to standing of party winning in 2011; negative points to 2011's second-place party being swung to.)	
Riding and winning party			%	Change (pp)	%	Change (pp)	To	Change (pp)
Agassiz	PC	Hold	56.05	-1.08	75.53	0.23	N/A (Note: an Independent candidate came in second in 2016, but did not stand in 2019)	
Assiniboia	PC	Hold	54.70	-4.87	44.25	-0.85	NDP	-3.59
Borderland	PC	Hold	61.86	8.38	66.09	-13.21	Lib	-1.14
Brandon East	PC	Hold	45.68	-8.81	51.00	-0.5	NDP	-0.74
Brandon West	PC	Hold	51.27	-4.65	58.39	-9.81	NDP	-5.68
Burrows	NDP	Gain	46.08	-6.53	39.70	5.9	NDP	-18.33
Concordia	NDP	Hold	48.46	-5.63	59.69	15.59	NDP	11.67
Dauphin	PC	Hold	58.62	-3.23	50.52	-6.28	NDP	-14.12
Dawson Trail	PC	Hold	57.84	0.06	55.41	1.21	PC	0.22
Elmwood	NDP	Hold	50.23	-4.76	48.68	3.08	NDP	7.6
Flin Flon	NDP	Hold	33.91	-0.53	63.19	24.89	NDP	15.83
Fort Garry	NDP	Gain	61.69	-6.85	42.35	6.45	NDP	3.62
Fort Richmond	PC	Hold	57.38	-9.72	42.15	-5.55	PC	5.32
Fort Rouge	NDP	Hold	58.76	-6.39	51.24	13.34	NDP	11.79
Fort Whyte	PC	Hold	60.35	-0.36	57.19	-7.31	NDP	-4.3
Interlake-Gimli	PC	Hold	65.56		58.62	-2.18		
Keewatinook	NDP	Gain	21.84	-2.47	67.08	26.38	NDP	-29.94
Kildonan-River East	PC	Hold	61.82		51.10	-6.2		
Kirkfield Park	PC	Hold	61.25	-7.47	50.36	-1.84	PC	0.67
La Vérendrye	PC	Hold	55.41	0.09	72.79	-5.81	PC	5.68
Lac du Bonnet	PC	Hold	61.24	6.32	65.91	-11.59	NDP	-4.2
Lagimodière	PC	Hold	62.27		51.78	-12.02		
Lakeside	PC	Hold	59.22	1.44	68.24	-11.76	NDP	-8.62
McPhillips	PC	Hold	56.64		38.19	-9.51		
Midland	PC	Hold	59.27	-0.38	75.01	-3.39	PC	4.76
Morden-Winkler	PC	Hold	51.19	-0.74	80.86	-2.24	Green	-3.11
Notre Dame	NDP	Hold	40.86	-10.52	65.01	20.21	NDP	8.2
Point Douglas	NDP	Hold	36.00	-6.53	62.35	7.45	NDP	6.1
Portage la Prairie	PC	Hold	48.64	-2.69	65.67	-4.93	PC	0.82
Radisson	PC	Hold	56.47	-6.37	46.97	-6.83	NDP	-4.08
Red River North	PC	Hold	63.96		57.97	-8.23		
Riding Mountain	PC	Hold	55.72	0.22	65.91	-7.29	PC	2.67
Riel	PC	Hold	63.24	-4.14	44.75	-6.15	NDP	-5.48
River Heights	Lib	Hold	65.48	-7.23	53.79	7.59	Lib	5.89
Roblin	PC	Hold	61.83	-3.82	55.19	-7.11	Lib	-3.84
Rossmere	PC	Hold	59.62	-0.9	46.91	-11.69	NDP	-5.58
Seine River	PC	Hold	62.12		45.04	-7.96		
Selkirk	PC	Hold	59.25	0.52	51.84	-4.46	NDP	-5.53
Southdale	PC	Hold	61.66	-0.65	42.40	-9.2	NDP	-17.85
Springfield-Ritchot	PC	Hold	60.56		59.48	-7.22		
Spruce Woods	PC	Hold	56.75	4.76	68.06	-3.34	N/A (Note: Manitoba First (then called the Manitoba Party) finished second in 2016, but opted not to field candidates in this election)	
St. Boniface	Lib	Gain	59.78	-3.89	41.69	22.89	PC	-2.91
St. James	NDP	Gain	55.78	-6.16	47.25	12.65	NDP	-12.03
St. Johns	NDP	Hold	47.34	-4.09	51.88	14.58	NDP	9.86
St. Vital	NDP	Gain	60.78	-3.19	44.47	10.17	NDP	-7.23
Steinbach	PC	Hold	52.49	0.78	81.64	-6.96	Lib	-3.24
Swan River	PC	Hold	54.87	-5.31	68.87	3.47	PC	9.98
The Maples	NDP	Hold	53.08	-2.55	39.51	3.21	NDP	5.62
The Pas-Kameesak	NDP	Hold	43.04	12.34	57.90	19.1	NDP	14.47
Thompson	NDP	Gain	37.27	-0.08	54.55	16.15	NDP	-11.82
Transcona	NDP	Gain	52.45	-3.54	46.42	18.22	NDP	-11.07
Turtle Mountain	PC	Hold	57.28	3.99	67.48	-8.62	N/A	
Tuxedo	PC	Hold	57.90	-4.5	47.85	-5.25	NDP	-7.52
Tyndall Park	Lib	Gain	56.39	2.99	54.67	23.27	Lib	-16.46
Union Station	NDP	Hold	44.06	-7.92	52.62	12.72	NDP	11.44
Waverley	PC	Hold	51.95		50.05	-4.85		
Wolseley	NDP	Hold	56.96	-6.3	46.03	1.33	NDP	2.35

=== Changes in party shares ===
Share change analysis by party and riding (2019 vs 2016)
Riding	Green		Liberal		NDP		PC	
Riding	%	Change (pp)	%	Change (pp)	%	Change (pp)	%	Change (pp)
Agassiz	5.57	0.27	6.13	5.23	12.77	6.37	75.53	0.23
Assiniboia	6.85	-0.55	13.43	-5.37	35.46	6.86	44.25	-0.85
Borderland	3.38	1.38	16.58	1.68	3.94	0.14	66.09	-13.21
Brandon East			12.66	0.56	36.34	-0.06	51.00	-0.50
Brandon West	10.13	10.13	7.68	-0.02	23.80	-0.40	58.39	-9.81
Burrows	–	-4.30	18.30	-23.30	39.70	5.90	26.12	6.32
Concordia			8.49	-1.81	59.69	15.59	31.82	-9.88
Dauphin	–	-6.70	7.10	-0.70	42.39	15.89	50.52	-6.28
Dawson Trail	–	-2.70	22.87	3.97	21.72	2.42	55.41	1.21
Elmwood	9.58	9.58	9.35	8.65	48.68	3.08	31.82	-13.28
Flin Flon	3.82	2.02	5.95	-20.05	63.19	24.89	27.03	1.93
Fort Garry	7.65	-4.85	18.19	4.69	42.35	6.45	31.81	-5.89
Fort Richmond	4.93	0.33	30.72	18.02	22.20	-11.90	42.15	-5.55
Fort Rouge	16.01	-1.19	13.08	-1.92	51.24	13.34	18.82	-9.28
Fort Whyte	6.77	-0.43	17.62	6.22	17.88	2.18	57.19	-7.31
Interlake-Gimli	4.50	1.50	3.80	-7.30	33.07	8.47	58.62	-2.18
Keewatinook			18.58	-23.42	67.08	26.38	14.34	-2.86
Kildonan-River East	–	-1.80	14.87	5.47	34.04	3.54	51.10	-6.20
Kirkfield Park	8.29	0.39	15.68	6.18	25.68	-4.52	50.36	-1.84
La Vérendrye	–	-3.20	12.87	2.27	14.34	6.74	72.79	-5.81
Lac du Bonnet	–	-1.70	14.74	13.54	19.36	-0.34	65.91	-11.59
Lagimodière	5.56	5.36	14.78	0.88	27.87	5.87	51.78	-12.02
Lakeside			9.52	5.92	22.24	5.84	68.24	-11.76
McPhillips	4.71	0.21	17.12	4.32	37.19	3.19	38.19	-9.51
Midland	–	-4.50	9.64	0.34	15.35	7.55	75.01	-3.39
Morden-Winkler	10.64	0.84	3.67	-0.33	4.83	1.73	80.86	-2.24
Notre Dame	5.08	-1.72	13.67	-8.53	65.01	20.21	15.09	-4.81
Point Douglas	8.23	2.73	11.81	-9.09	62.35	7.45	15.17	-1.23
Portage la Prairie			12.33	-6.47	22.00	11.40	65.67	-4.93
Radisson	5.93	5.93	10.40	-2.20	36.71	5.01	46.97	-6.83
Red River North	7.70	7.70	7.65	-4.45	24.87	3.17	57.97	-8.23
Riding Mountain	7.81	1.31	5.08	-2.82	21.20	13.40	65.91	-7.29
Riel	5.96	5.26	13.90	-5.50	35.39	6.29	44.75	-6.15
River Heights	6.92	-1.18	53.79	7.59	14.58	2.88	24.70	-9.10
Roblin	11.02	0.02	15.79	2.39	18.00	4.70	55.19	-7.11
Rossmere	6.60	6.60	7.63	-0.57	38.85	8.25	46.91	-11.69
Seine River	6.79	6.79	22.16	2.86	26.01	-1.19	45.04	-7.96
Selkirk	7.62	1.22	5.13	-2.87	35.42	8.12	51.84	-4.46
Southdale	5.62	4.82	13.47	-3.33	37.84	6.94	42.40	-9.20
Springfield-Ritchot	11.18	10.08	8.54	-6.26	20.79	5.59	59.48	-7.22
Spruce Woods	9.85	8.15	6.21	-1.19	15.87	2.27	68.06	-3.34
St. Boniface	8.48	-3.52	41.69	22.89	29.87	-12.13	19.15	-7.95
St. James	9.52	-0.48	10.39	-3.41	47.25	12.65	32.84	-5.66
St. Johns	7.40	-3.10	16.25	-6.65	51.88	14.58	24.48	-4.72
St. Vital	5.46	-0.84	13.85	-2.75	44.47	10.17	34.90	-7.90
Steinbach	5.47	5.47	4.84	-1.36	8.06	2.86	81.64	-6.96
Swan River	–	-5.40	5.25	-2.15	25.88	4.38	68.87	3.47
The Maples	4.09	-2.91	29.76	6.96	39.51	3.21	26.64	-7.26
The Pas-Kameesak	14.38	11.08	3.39	-15.91	57.90	19.10	24.33	-14.17
Thompson	6.05	6.05	3.72	-17.18	54.55	16.15	35.68	-4.82
Transcona			8.45	-10.15	46.42	18.22	45.13	-4.67
Turtle Mountain	14.91	11.51	6.72	2.32	10.90	2.20	67.48	-8.62
Tuxedo	8.17	-5.83	23.56	4.96	19.79	5.49	47.85	-5.25
Tyndall Park	2.00	-4.50	54.67	23.27	30.55	-5.75	12.51	-13.19
Union Station	9.72	-4.48	18.73	-4.07	52.62	12.72	17.16	-2.44
Waverley	4.96	2.46	16.39	2.69	28.60	1.20	50.05	-4.85
Wolseley	36.00	6.80	8.38	-0.62	46.03	1.33	9.03	-4.27

= did not field a candidate in 2016

=== Summary analysis ===
Party candidates in 2nd place
Party in 1st place	Party in 2nd place				Total
Party in 1st place	PC	NDP	Liberal	Grn	Total
Progressive Conservative		30	4	2	36
New Democratic	14		3	1	18
Liberal	1	2			8
Total	15	32	7	3	57

Principal races, according to 1st and 2nd-place results
Parties		Seats
█ Progressive Conservative	█ New Democratic	44
█ Progressive Conservative	█ Liberal	5
█ Progressive Conservative	█ Green	2
█ New Democratic	█ Liberal	5
█ New Democratic	█ Green	1
Total		57

Candidates ranked 1st to 5th place, by party
Parties	1st	2nd	3rd	4th	5th	Total
Progressive Conservative	36	15	6			57
New Democratic	18	32	6	1		57
Liberal	3	7	32	15		57
Green		3	12	27	1	43
Manitoba First					5	5
Manitoba Forward				1	3	4
Independent			1		2	3

=== Seats changing hands ===
Elections to the 42nd Legislative Assembly of Manitoba – seats won/lost by party, 2016–2019
Party	2016 (Redist)	Gain from (loss to)						2019
Party	2016 (Redist)	PC		NDP		Lib		2019
Progressive Conservative	41				(5)			36
New Democratic	13	5				2	(2)	18
Liberal	3			2	(2)			3
**Total**	57	5	–	2	(7)	2	(2)	57

Nine seats changed allegiance in 2019:

PC to NDP

- Fort Garry
- St. James
- St. Vital
- Thompson
- Transcona

Liberal to NDP

- Burrows
- Keewatinook

NDP to Liberal

- St. Boniface
- Tyndall Park

Resulting composition of the 42nd Legislative Assembly of Manitoba
Source		Party			
Source		**PC**	**NDP**	**Lib**	Total
Seats retained	Incumbents returned	29	7	1	37
Seats retained	Seats retained by incumbents from other ridings	5			5
Seats retained	Open seats held	1	4		5
Seats retained	Ouster of incumbent changing affiliation	1			1
Seats changing hands	Incumbents defeated		3		3
Seats changing hands	Open seats gained		4		4
Seats changing hands	Seat gained by incumbent from another riding			1	1
Seats changing hands	Byelection gain held			1	1
**Total**		36	18	3	57

=== Incumbents not running for reelection ===
Riding	Incumbent at dissolution and subsequent nominee		New MLA
Assiniboia	Steven Fletcher (elected as PC)	none	Scott Johnston
Fort Garry-Riverview (redistributed to Fort Garry)	James Allum	Mark Wasyliw	Mark Wasyliw
Kildonan (redistributed to Kildonan-River East)	Nic Curry	Cathy Cox	Cathy Cox
Logan (redistributed to Notre Dame and Union Station)	Flor Marcelino	Uzoma Asagwara	Uzoma Asagwara
Wolseley	Rob Altemeyer	Lisa Naylor	Lisa Naylor
Minto (redistributed to Notre Dame)	Andrew Swan	Malaya Marcelino	Malaya Marcelino
Keewatinook	Judy Klassen	Jason Harper	Ian Bushie
