= 2017 Manitoba New Democratic Party leadership election =

Election of political party leader in Manitoba, Canada

- September 16, 2017
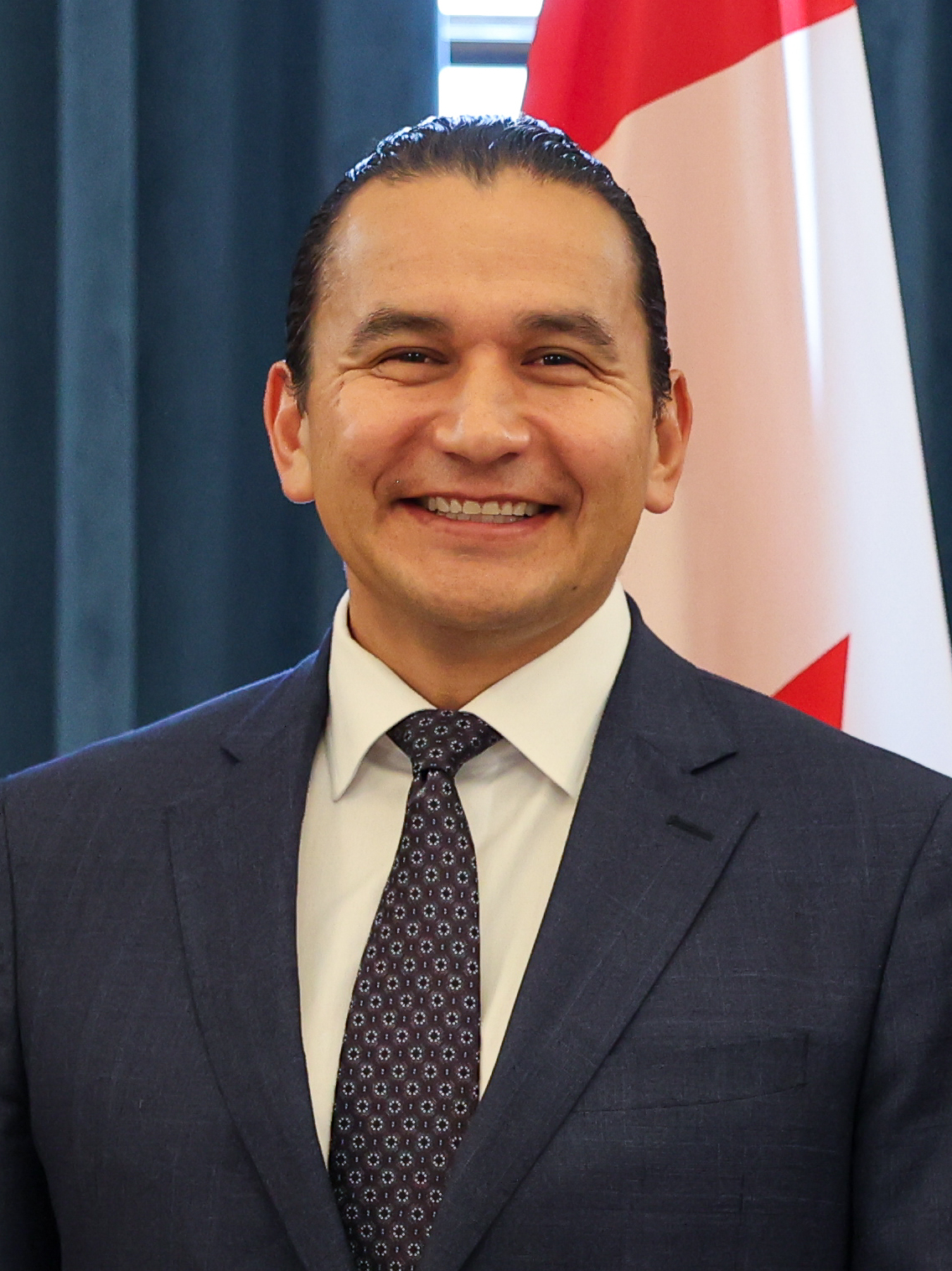
| | | Steve Ashton |
| Candidate | Wab Kinew | Steve Ashton |
| Popular vote | 728 | 253 |
| Percentage | 74.21% | 25.79% |
Leader before election
Greg Selinger
Elected leader
Wab Kinew

2017 New Democratic Party of Manitoba leadership election
- Date: September 16, 2017
- Convention: RBC Convention Centre Winnipeg
- Resigning leader: Greg Selinger
- Won by: Wab Kinew
- Ballots: 1
- Candidates: 2
- Entrance fee: $5,000
- Spending limit: $75,000

The New Democratic Party of Manitoba leadership election of 2017 was called as a result of the resignation of Manitoba NDP leader Greg Selinger following his government's defeat in the April 19, 2016, Manitoba general election.

== Rules ==
The rules and format of the leadership election were decided by the party in March 2017 where no major changes to the status quo were approved. The party decided in favour of holding a traditional delegated leadership convention rather than a one member, one vote election. In the 2015 race, labour unions had been allotted 31 per cent of delegate slots.

== Timeline ==
- April 19, 2016 — General election. Greg Selinger's NDP government is defeated; Selinger announces his intention to resign as party leader.
- May 7, 2016 — Flor Marcelino (Logan) is named interim leader of the NDP and Leader of the Opposition in the Legislative Assembly of Manitoba.
- September 21, 2016 — Kevin Chief, a former senior minister in Selinger's cabinet who was widely seen as his likely successor, announces he will not be a candidate for the leadership. He subsequently announced his resignation as an MLA, effective January 9, 2017.
- June 12, 2016 — NDP Provincial Council decides that the leadership election will be held by October 2017.
- December 11, 2016 — NDP Provincial Council decides that the election be held in mid-September 2017 and recommends a series of rule changes such as a leadership review process, that one of two systems be used for electing the leader: The first would allow every party member to vote, with a minimum number of votes guaranteed to smaller constituencies and unions. The second would use a delegate system that would include more flexibility and representation for unions. Recommendations are to be voted upon at the annual NDP convention in March.
- March 17–19, 2017 — NDP annual convention to meet at the Indian & Metis Friendship Centre in Winnipeg. The convention decided to have a traditional delegated leadership convention rather than have a One Member One Vote election.
- April 10, 2017 — Wab Kinew declares his candidacy.
- June 18, 2017, 4:30 PM — Deadline to become a new member or renew membership of the party and be able to vote for delegates to the convention, or be a delegate.
- June 28, 2017 — Steve Ashton declares his candidacy.
- July 15, 2017 — Nomination deadline
- July 18, 2017, 7 PM — Leadership forum at Riverbank Discovery Centre in Brandon
- July 20, 2017, 7:30 PM — Leadership forum at Gimli Recreation Centre in Gimli
- July 24, 2017, 7 PM — Leadership forum at Vale Community Centre Gymnasium in Thompson
- July 26, 2017, 7 PM — Leadership forum at Richardson College for the Environment and Science Complex, University of Winnipeg
- July 31, 2017 — Deadline to apply to stand to be a delegate.
- August 8, 2017, 9:30 AM — Online voting to elect delegates begins.
- August 21, 2017, 4:30 PM — Online voting to elect delegates ends.
- September 16, 2017 — Leadership election to be held. Call to order at noon (Central Time), voting begins at 1:40 PM. Wab Kinew declared elected at 3:28 PM.

== Candidates ==
=== Steve Ashton ===
Steve Ashton, aged 61 at the time, launched his campaign on June 28, 2017.

Pledges made by Ashton included:

- reinvesting in community hospitals
- rebuilding the Manitoba NDP in rural Manitoba
- raising the minimum wage to $15 an hour in the first year of an NDP mandate
- lowering university tuition fees

Background

Former MLA for Thompson (1981–2016), Minister of Infrastructure and Transportation and Minister responsible for Emergency Measures (2015–2016), Minister of Infrastructure and Transportation (2009–2014), Minister of Intergovernmental Affairs (2006–2009), Minister of Water Stewardship (2003–2006), Minister of Labour and Immigration (2003), Minister of Conservation (2002–2003), Minister of Transportation and Government Services (2001–2002), Minister of Highways and Government Services (1999–2001). Runner-up in the 2009 leadership election and third place candidate in the 2015 leadership election. Father of federal NDP MP Niki Ashton.

Supporters

- MLAs (5): Flor Marcelino (Wellington, 2007–2011, and Logan, 2011–2019), interim party leader (2016—2017); Ted Marcelino (Tyndall Park, 2011–2019); Jim Maloway (Elmwood, 1986–2008 and 2011–present, and MP for Elmwood—Transcona 2008–2011) Amanda Lathlin (The Pas, 2015–present), Tom Lindsey (Flin Flon, 2016–present)
- Municipal politicians: Winnipeg City Councillor Jason Schreyer

=== Wab Kinew ===
Wab Kinew, aged 35 at the time, launched his campaign on April 10, 2017.

Pledges made by Kinew included:

- increasing minimum wage to $15 an hour incrementally by 2024
- targeting an NDP Caucus of 50% women, transgender, and non-binary-gender people. (Kinew would name an advisory council to assist in reaching this goal.)
- implementing universal pharmacare
- investing more in recreation and active living facilities

Background

Incumbent MLA for Fort Rouge since 2016, former broadcaster, musician, author, and professor.

Supporters

- MLAs (5): James Allum (Fort Garry-Riverview, 2011–2019); Nahanni Fontaine (St. Johns, 2016–present); Bernadette Smith (Point Douglas, 2017–present); Andrew Swan (Minto, 2004–2019); Matt Wiebe (Concordia, 2010–present)
- MPs (1): Daniel Blaikie (Elmwood—Transcona, 2015–2024)
- Municipal politicians (3): Lonnie Patterson, Brandon Town Councillor; Arlene Reid, Winnipeg School Division Trustee; Sherri Rollins, Chair of the Winnipeg School Division Board of Trustees
- Former MLAs (8): Nancy Allan (St. Vital, 1999-2016); Becky Barrett (Inkster/Wellington, 1990–2003); Eugene Kostyra (Seven Oaks, 1981–1988); Ron Lemieux (Dawson Trail/La Verendrye, 1999–2016); Jim Rondeau (Assiniboia, 1999–2016); Tim Sale (Fort Rouge/Crescentwood, 1995–2007); Harry Schellenberg (Rossmere, 1993–1995, 1999–2007); Vic Schroeder (Rossmere, 1979–1988); Muriel Smith (Osborne, 1981–1988; and Deputy Premier, 1981–1988)
- Former MPs (3): Bill Blaikie (Elmwood—Transcona, 1979–2008); Pat Martin (Winnipeg Centre, 1997–2015); Judy Wasylycia-Leis (Winnipeg North/Winnipeg North Centre, 1997–2010; MLA St. John's, 1986–1993)
- Other prominent individuals (4): Gord Delbridge, Regional Vice-President - Manitoba, Canadian Union of Public Employees; Stephen Lewis, former United Nations Special Envoy for HIV/AIDS in Africa (2001–2006), Canadian Ambassador to the United Nations (1984–1988), and leader of the Ontario NDP (1970–1978); Michelle McHale, withdrawn leadership contestant; Jagmeet Singh, Ontario MPP for Bramalea—Gore—Malton and 2017 federal NDP leadership candidate
- Trade Unions and other organizations (4): Manitoba Federation of Labour; Amalgamated Transit Union Local 1505; Canadian Union of Public Employees - Manitoba; International Brotherhood of Electrical Workers Local 2085

=== Michelle McHale ===
Michelle McHale launched her campaign on March 10, 2017, but subsequently ended it on April 22. She would thereafter endorse Wab Kinew.

Background

Michelle McHale is a staff representative for the United Food and Commercial Workers union and social activist. She gained national prominence for organizing a pride parade in Steinbach, a conservative town in the province's Bible Belt.

== Declined ==
- James Allum, MLA for Fort Garry-Riverview (2011–2019), former Minister of Justice and Attorney General (2014–2016). Endorsed Kinew.
- Niki Ashton, MP for Churchill/Churchill—Keewatinook Aski (2008–2025). Placed seventh in the 2012 federal NDP leadership race. Candidate in the 2017 federal NDP leadership race.
- Rebecca Blaikie, former president of the New Democratic Party of Canada (2011–2016)
- Kevin Chief, MLA for Point Douglas (2011–2016), Minister of Jobs and the Economy (2014–2016), Minister of Children and Youth Opportunities (2012–2014) announced in September 2016 that he will not be a candidate and then announced in December 2016 that he is resigning his seat in the legislature.
- Nahanni Fontaine, MLA for St. Johns (2016–present) Endorsed Kinew.
- Brian Mayes, Winnipeg City Councillor (2011–present) and a member of the city's executive committee, was considered a possible candidate but announced that he intends to remain at city hall.
- Theresa Oswald, runner-up in 2015 leadership election, former MLA for Seine River (2003–2016), Minister of Jobs and the Economy (2013–2014), Minister of Health (2006–2013), Minister of Healthy Living (2004–2006).
- Andrew Swan, MLA for Minto (2004–2019), former cabinet minister under Doer and Selinger. Said in April 2017 that he was considering a run but later endorsed Kinew.
- Matt Wiebe, MLA for Concordia (2010–present); Endorsed Kinew.

== Results ==
| Candidate | Votes | % |
|---|---|---|
| Wab Kinew | 728 | 74.3 |
| Steve Ashton | 253 | 25.7 |
| Total Valid Votes | 981 | 100.00 |
