= Manitoba Party (disambiguation) =

The Manitoba Party is a defunct Canadian provincial political party that was originally registered in 2019 as the Manitoba Forward Party.

Manitoba Party may also refer to:

== Former parties ==
- Manitoba Party (1998)
- Manitoba First, originally registered as the Manitoba Party in 2016
