= Union Station (electoral district) =

Provincial electoral district in Manitoba, Canada

Manitoba electoral district
- Location in Winnipeg

Provincial electoral district
- Legislature: Legislative Assembly of Manitoba
MLA
Uzoma Asagwara
New Democratic
- District created: 2018
- First contested: 2019
- Last contested: 2023

Demographics
- Population (2016): 21,885
- Census division: Division No. 11
- Census subdivision: Winnipeg

Union Station (French: Gare-Union) is a provincial electoral district of Manitoba, Canada, that was first contested at the 2019 Manitoba general election. Uzoma Asagwara of the New Democratic Party was elected its first representative to the Legislative Assembly of Manitoba.

The riding contains most of Downtown Winnipeg and parts of the neighbourhoods of West Broadway and Spence.

== History ==
The riding was created by the 2018 provincial redistribution out of parts of Logan, Wolseley and Minto. The riding is presumably named for Union Station and according to the boundaries commission "to recognize the important role of the railway in the establishment of Winnipeg".

== Election results ==
2023 Manitoba general election
| Party | Candidate | Votes | % | ±% | Expenditures |
|---|---|---|---|---|---|
| New Democratic | Uzoma Asagwara | 3,714 | 70.78 | +18.16 | $11,910.44 |
| Progressive Conservative | Aaron Croning | 917 | 17.48 | +0.32 | $0.00 |
| Liberal | Iqra Tariq | 616 | 11.74 | -6.99 | $6,798.42 |
| Total valid votes/expense limit | | 5,247 | 98.93 | – | $49,273.00 |
| Total rejected and declined ballots | | 57 | 1.07 | – | |
| Turnout | | 5,304 | 42.21 | -1.85 | |
| Eligible voters | | 12,567 | | | |
| New Democratic hold | | Swing | | +8.92 | |
Source(s) Source: Elections Manitoba

2019 Manitoba general election
| Party | Candidate | Votes | % | ±% | Expenditures |
|---|---|---|---|---|---|
| New Democratic | Uzoma Asagwara | 2,635 | 52.23 | +13.3 | $17,642.20 |
| Liberal | Harold Davis | 949 | 18.81 | -4.0 | $4,328.11 |
| Progressive Conservative | Tara Fawcett | 908 | 18.00 | -1.6 | $521.28 |
| Green | Andrea Shalay | 473 | 9.38 | -4.8 | $2,067.06 |
| Communist | Elsa Cubas | 48 | 0.95 | | $310.80 |
| Manitoba Forward | James Yau | 32 | 0.63 | | $0.00 |
| Total valid votes | | 5,045 | 100.0 | | |
| Total rejected ballots | | | | | |
| Turnout | | | 43.9 | | |
| Eligible voters | | | | | |
| New Democratic hold | | Swing | | +8.2 | |

2016 provincial election redistributed results
| Party | % |
|---|---|
| New Democratic | 39.9 |
| Liberal | 22.8 |
| Progressive Conservative | 19.6 |
| Green | 14.2 |
| Others | 3.5 |

== See also ==
- List of Manitoba provincial electoral districts
- Canadian provincial electoral districts
