= Dougald Lamont =

Canadian politician (born 1969)

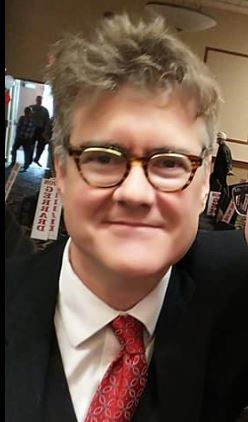
- Lamont in 2017

Leader of the Manitoba Liberal Party
- In office October 21, 2017 – October 3, 2023
- Preceded by: Rana Bokhari
- Succeeded by: Cindy Lamoureux (Interim)

Member of the Legislative Assembly of Manitoba for St. Boniface
- In office July 17, 2018 – September 5, 2023
- Preceded by: Greg Selinger
- Succeeded by: Robert Loiselle

Personal details
- Born: April 23, 1969 (age 57) Winnipeg, Manitoba, Canada
- Party: Liberal
- Spouse: Cecilia Lamont
- Education: University of Manitoba (BA) (MA)
- Occupation: Communications professional; political campaign operative
- Website: en.dougaldlamont.ca

Dougald Francis Lamont (born April 23, 1969) is a Canadian politician, who was leader of the Manitoba Liberal Party from 2017 to 2023. He was a member of the Legislative Assembly of Manitoba, representing the constituency of St. Boniface from July 2018 to October 2023.

== Early life ==
Lamont holds Bachelor of Arts and Master of Arts degrees in English literature from the University of Manitoba. He was a vice-president of the University of Manitoba Graduate Students' Association and a member of the University of Manitoba Board of Governors. Lamont worked as an instructor in government–business relations at the University of Winnipeg.

== Political career ==
He ran for a seat in the Manitoba legislature in the 2003 provincial election, placing second in St. Boniface behind then-finance minister and future New Democratic Party of Manitoba leader and Premier Greg Selinger.

In 2013, Lamont was the runner-up in the Manitoba Liberal Party leadership election to Rana Bokhari.

Lamont has worked as an advisor to Jon Gerrard, Sharon Carstairs, MaryAnn Mihychuk, Robert-Falcon Ouellette, and Winnipeg City Council member John Orlikow. He served as co-chair of Ouellette's campaign to become Mayor of Winnipeg in 2014, and was director of communications for Ouellette's successful campaign to become Member of Parliament for Winnipeg Centre in 2015.

Lamont was elected Manitoba Liberal leader at the October 21, 2017 Liberal leadership election, defeating MLA Cindy Lamoureux on the second ballot by eight votes. On July 17, 2018, he was elected to the Legislative Assembly of Manitoba for St. Boniface in a by-election held after Greg Selinger resigned as the riding's MLA when he retired from politics. Following the by-election Lamont Was briefly leader of the Second Opposition, gaining official party status in the Manitoba Legislature

Lamont led the Manitoba Liberals into the 2019 provincial election. He was one of three Liberal MLAs returned, being re-elected in St. Boniface, while Gerrard was re-elected in River Heights and Lamoureux won in Tyndall Park.

Lamont led the Manitoba Liberals into the 2023 provincial election. He resigned as leader of the Manitoba Liberals with the loss of his seat in the 2023 election, which saw the Liberals reduced to a single seat, retaining only Lamoureux's riding of Tyndall Park. Lamoureux succeeded him as leader on an interim basis, and former professional football player Willard Reaves was elected in 2025 to permanently replace Lamont as Liberal leader.

== Electoral record ==
2023 Manitoba general election: St. Boniface
Party	Candidate	Votes	%	±%	Expenditures
New Democratic	Robert Loiselle	5,585	53.38	+23.51	$26,407.59
Liberal	Dougald Lamont	3,413	32.62	-9.06	$14,316.61
Progressive Conservative	Kiratveer Hayer	1,391	13.30	-5.85	$0.00
Communist	Damon Bath	73	0.70	–	$106.40
Total valid votes/expense limit		10,462	99.42	–	$69,418.00
Total rejected and declined ballots		61	0.58	–	
Turnout		10,523	60.06	+0.28	
Eligible voters		17,521			
New Democratic gain from Liberal		Swing		+16.29	
Source(s) Source: Elections Manitoba

2019 Manitoba general election: St. Boniface
Party	Candidate	Votes	%	±%	Expenditures
Liberal	Dougald Lamont	4,152	41.69	-0.56	$9,847.24
New Democratic	Laurissa Sims	2,975	29.87	+1.31	$9,258.35
Progressive Conservative	Megan Hoskins	1,907	19.15	+5.91	$894.61
Green	Jaclyn Jeanson	845	8.48	-7.46	$0.00
Manitoba Forward	Simone Fortier	81	0.81	New	$0.00
Total		9,960	99.03	–	
Rejected		98	0.97	+0.56	
Turnout		10,058	59.78	+12.88	
Eligible voters		16,824			
Liberal hold		Swing		-0.94	
Source(s) Source: Manitoba. Chief Electoral Officer (2019). Statement of Votes for the 42nd Provincial General Election, September 10, 2019 (PDF) (Report). Winnipeg: Elections Manitoba.

Manitoba provincial by-election, 17 July 2018: St. Boniface Resignation of Greg Selinger
Party	Candidate	Votes	%	±%	Expenditures
Liberal	Dougald Lamont	2,625	42.03	+22.57	$
New Democratic	Blandine Tona	1,770	28.34	-14.07	$
Green	Françoise Therrien Vrignon	1,017	16.28	+4.02	$
Progressive Conservative	Mamadou Ka	834	13.35	-12.52	$
Total valid votes		6,246	99.62		
Total rejected and declines votes		24	0.38	-1.24	
Turnout		6,270	48.38	-15.29	
Electors on the lists		12,960			
Liberal gain from New Democratic		Swing		+18.32	

2003 Manitoba general election: St. Boniface
Party	Candidate	Votes	%	±%	Expenditures
New Democratic	Greg Selinger	4,904	74.34	+17.77	$18,257.78
Liberal	Dougald Lamont	952	14.43	-16.71	$5,020.72
Progressive Conservative	Dan Zahari	741	11.23	-1.05	$769.27
Total valid votes		6,597	100.00		
Rejected and declined ballots		38			
Turnout		6,635	52.19		
Electors on the lists		12,712			
