= Nic Curry =

Canadian provincial politician

Member of the Legislative Assembly of Manitoba for Kildonan
- In office April 19, 2016 – August 12, 2019
- Preceded by: Dave Chomiak
- Succeeded by: riding dissolved

Personal details
- Party: Progressive Conservative

Nic Curry is a Canadian provincial politician, who was elected as the Member of the Legislative Assembly of Manitoba for the riding of Kildonan in the 2016 election. He is a member of the Manitoba Progressive Conservative Party.

He did not stand for reelection in the 2019 Manitoba general election.

== Election result ==
2016 Manitoba general election: Kildonan
Party	Candidate	Votes	%	±%	Expenditures
Progressive Conservative	Nic Curry	3,694	44.39	8.74	$37,848.07
New Democratic	Dave Chomiak	3,065	36.83	-22.68	$16,450.60
Liberal	Navdeep Khangura	974	11.70	6.86	$9,891.04
Green	Steven Stairs	456	5.48	–	$0.00
Manitoba	Gary Marshall	133	1.60	–	$1,129.52
Total valid votes/expense limit		8,322	–	–	$45,931.00
Rejected		83	–		
Eligible voters / turnout		13,787	60.96	5.99	
Source(s) Source: Manitoba. Chief Electoral Officer (2016). Statement of Votes for the 41st Provincial General Election, April 19, 2016 (PDF) (Report). Winnipeg: Elections Manitoba. "Election Returns: 41st General Election". Elections Manitoba. 2016.
