= Riding Mountain (provincial electoral district) =

Provincial electoral district in Manitoba, Canada

Coordinates: 50.681°N 100.590°W

Manitoba electoral district

Provincial electoral district
- Legislature: Legislative Assembly of Manitoba
MLA
Greg Nesbitt
Progressive Conservative
- District created: 2008
- First contested: 2011
- Last contested: 2023

Demographics
- Population (2016): 24,255
- Electors (2019): 16,761
- Area (km²): 13,549
- Pop. density (per km²): 1.8

Riding Mountain (French: Mont-Riding) is a provincial electoral district of Manitoba, Canada. It was created by redistribution in 2008.

Communities in the riding include Minnedosa, Rapid City, Hamiota, Virden and Birtle. The riding's population in 2021 was 24960.

== Members of the Legislative Assembly ==
Assembly	Years	Member	Party
Riding created from Russell and Minnedosa
40th	2011–2016	Leanne Rowat	Progressive Conservative
41st	2016–2019	Greg Nesbitt	Progressive Conservative
42nd	2019–2023	Greg Nesbitt	Progressive Conservative
43rd	2023–present	Greg Nesbitt	Progressive Conservative

== Electoral results ==
=== 2011 ===
2011 Manitoba general election
Party	Candidate	Votes	%	Expenditures
Progressive Conservative	Leanne Rowat	4,465	58.47	$20,447.87
New Democratic	Albert Parsons	2,633	34.48	$10,993.16
Liberal	Carl Hyde	272	3.56	$284.81
Green	Signe Knutson	267	3.50	$536.64
Total valid votes		7,637	–	
Rejected		14	–	
Eligible voters / turnout		14,165	54.01	
Source(s) Source: Manitoba. Chief Electoral Officer (2011). Statement of Votes for the 40th Provincial General Election, October 4, 2011 (PDF) (Report). Winnipeg: Elections Manitoba. "Election Returns: 40th General Election". Elections Manitoba. 2011.

=== 2016 ===
2016 Manitoba general election
Party	Candidate	Votes	%	±%	Expenditures
Progressive Conservative	Greg Nesbitt	5,311	68.80	10.34	$12,173.26
Liberal	Jordan Fleury	1,028	13.32	9.76	$2,702.78
Green	Mark Olenick	779	10.09	6.60	$0.00
New Democratic	Béla Gyarmati	601	7.79	-26.69	$146.90
Total valid votes		7,719	–	–	
Rejected		93	–		
Eligible voters / turnout		14,075	55.50	1.49	
Source(s) Source: Manitoba. Chief Electoral Officer (2016). Statement of Votes for the 41st Provincial General Election, April 19, 2016 (PDF) (Report). Winnipeg: Elections Manitoba. "Election Returns: 41st General Election". Elections Manitoba. 2016.

=== 2019 ===
2019 Manitoba general election
Party	Candidate	Votes	%	±%	Expenditures
Progressive Conservative	Greg Nesbitt	6,126	65.91	-2.89	$3,171.65
New Democratic	Wayne Chacun	1,970	21.20	13.41	$7,438.18
Green	Mary Lowe	726	7.81	-2.28	$0.00
Liberal	Jordan Fleury	472	5.08	-8.24	$0.00
Total valid votes		9,294	–	–	
Rejected		46	–		
Eligible voters / turnout		16,761	55.72	0.22	
Source(s) Source: Manitoba. Chief Electoral Officer (2019). Statement of Votes for the 42nd Provincial General Election, September 10, 2019 (PDF) (Report). Winnipeg: Elections Manitoba. "Candidate Election Returns". Elections Manitoba. Elections Manitoba.

=== 2023 ===
2023 Manitoba general election
Party	Candidate	Votes	%	±%	Expenditures
Progressive Conservative	Greg Nesbitt	5,644	63.02	-2.89	$12,575.91
New Democratic	Wayne Chacun	2,895	32.32	+11.13	$4,259.75
Liberal	Eileen Smerchanski	417	4.66	-0.42	$0.00
Total valid votes/expense limit		8,956	99.16	–	$62,186.00
Total rejected and declined ballots		76	0.84	–	
Turnout		9,032	57.42	+1.69	
Eligible voters		15,730			
Progressive Conservative hold		Swing		-7.01	
Source(s) Source: Elections Manitoba

== See also ==
- List of Manitoba provincial electoral districts
- Canadian provincial electoral districts
