= Cindy Lamoureux =

Canadian provincial politician

Cindy Lamoureux MLA

Interim Leader of the Manitoba Liberal Party
- In office October 17, 2023 – September 29, 2025
- Deputy: Willard Reaves (2023—2024)
- Preceded by: Dougald Lamont
- Succeeded by: Willard Reaves

Deputy Leader of the Manitoba Liberal Party
- Incumbent
- Assumed office October 20, 2025 Serving with Jasbir Singh
- Leader: Willard Reaves

Member of the Legislative Assembly of Manitoba for Tyndall Park
- Incumbent
- Assumed office September 10, 2019
- Preceded by: Ted Marcelino

Member of the Legislative Assembly of Manitoba for Burrows
- In office April 19, 2016 – September 10, 2019
- Preceded by: Melanie Wight
- Succeeded by: Diljeet Brar

Personal details
- Born: November 13, 1991 (age 34)
- Party: Liberal
- Parent: Kevin Lamoureux (father)
- Education: University of Winnipeg

Cindy Lamoureux (born November 13, 1991) is a Canadian provincial politician, who was elected as the Member of the Legislative Assembly of Manitoba for the riding of Burrows in the 2016 election.

She defeated NDP incumbent Melanie Wight, who had held the riding since the 2011 election. Elected at age 24, she was the youngest MLA in Manitoba upon her election. She was subsequently elected to represent the Tyndall Park riding in 2019 and 2023. Lamoureux was appointed interim leader of the Manitoba Liberal Party on October 17, 2023 after she was the only Liberal to hold her seat in the 2023 Manitoba general election.

== Early life and education ==
Lamoureux is from an active political family in western Canada. She is the daughter of federal Member of Parliament Kevin Lamoureux, and her uncle Darrin Lamoureux previously served as the leader of the Saskatchewan Liberal Party.

Her first job was at Blockbuster. She received her education at the University of Winnipeg.

== Political career ==
On April 21, 2017, she announced that she was running to succeed Rana Bokhari as the leader of the Manitoba Liberal Party. Former Manitoba Liberal leader and longtime MLA Jon Gerrard and entrepreneur and teacher Dougald Lamont also contested the leadership. Lamoureux led on the first ballot at the leadership election but lost to Lamont on the second ballot.

She was reelected in the 2019 Manitoba general election, in which she shifted from Burrows to the neighbouring constituency of Tyndall Park. Gerrard and Lamont were the only other two Liberals elected, winning their respective constituencies of River Heights and St. Boniface. In the 2023 Manitoba general election, Lamoureux was reelected, Gerrard and Lamont were defeated, and no other Liberal was elected, leaving Lamoureux the only Liberal member of the legislature.

On October 17, 2023, she was appointed as the interim leader of the Manitoba Liberals and served until Willard Reaves was acclaimed as the new leader on September 29, 2025.

On October 20, 2025, she was appointed as the co-Deputy Leader of the party, serving with Jasbir Singh.

== Electoral record ==
2023 Manitoba general election: Tyndall Park
Party	Candidate	Votes	%	±%	Expenditures
Liberal	Cindy Lamoureux	4,030	54.99	+0.78	$15,618.38
New Democratic	Kelly Legaspi	1,908	26.04	-4.25	$2,769.87
Progressive Conservative	Chris Santos	1,390	18.97	+6.56	$11,003.48
Total valid votes/expense limit		7,328	99.58	–	$57,655.00
Total rejected and declined ballots		31	0.42	–	
Turnout		7,359	49.75	-7.09	
Eligible voters		14,793			
Liberal hold		Swing		+2.52	
Source(s) Source: Elections Manitoba

2019 Manitoba general election: Tyndall Park
Party	Candidate	Votes	%	±%	Expenditures
Liberal	Cindy Lamoureux	4,301	54.29	+24.1	$20,300.22
New Democratic	Ted Marcelino	2,403	30.95	-8.0	$24,073.41
Progressive Conservative	Daljit Kainth	984	12.53	-11.3	$24,220.96
Green	Fleur Mann	157	1.95	-5.2	$0.00
Communist	Frank Komarniski	22	0.28	+0.3	$310.80
Total valid votes		7,933	100.0		
Total rejected ballots		63	0.8		
Turnout			58.5		
Eligible voters		14,068			
Liberal gain from New Democratic		Swing		+16.1	

2016 Manitoba general election: Burrows
Party	Candidate	Votes	%	±%	Expenditures
Liberal	Cindy Lamoureux	2,641	46.55	+34.36	$20,607.02
New Democratic	Melanie Wight	1,775	31.28	-28.05	$27,748.99
Progressive Conservative	Rae Wagner	1,014	17.87	-7.58	$8,151.23
Green	Garrett Bodnaryk	216	3.81	+1.40	$0.00
Communist	Tony Petrowski	28	0.49	-0.13	$33.67
Total valid votes/expense limit		5,674	–	–	$34,273.00
Rejected		51	–		
Eligible voters / turnout		10,883	52.60	5.52	
Liberal gain from New Democratic		Swing		+31.21	
Source(s) Source: Manitoba. Chief Electoral Officer (2016). Statement of Votes for the 41st Provincial General Election, April 19, 2016 (PDF) (Report). Winnipeg: Elections Manitoba. "Election Returns: 41st General Election". Elections Manitoba. 2016.
