= 2017 Manitoba Liberal Party leadership election =

- Date: October 21, 2017
- Convention: Victoria Inn Conference Centre; Winnipeg, Manitoba
- Resigning leader: Rana Bokhari
- Won by: Dougald Lamont
- Ballots: 2
- Candidates: 3
- Entrance fee: $5,000

The Liberal Party of Manitoba leadership election of 2017 was held on October 21, 2017, at the Victoria Inn Conference Centre in Winnipeg. The election was called as a result of the party leader Rana Bokhari's announcing her pending resignation on May 7, 2016 (she resigned on September 24, 2016), following the April 19, 2016, Manitoba general election.

== Rules ==
To be nominated, a candidate must have collected the signatures of at least 100 party members, at least 10 from each of the party's six regions, submitted a valid police record check and tax return for the most recent year, and paid a non-refundable deposit of $5,000 or have sold an equivalent number of memberships in the party. The deadline for nominations was 30 days prior to the October 21, 2017 convention. All individuals who were members in good standing of the Manitoba Liberal Party for at least 30 days prior to the convention were eligible to vote. Voting took place at the convention in Winnipeg and at regional polling places across the province. Advance voting by mail was only permitted in some remote constituencies and for members who required accommodation for medical or religious reasons. Votes were counted by constituency and weighted so that each constituency had an equal share, regardless of how many ballots were cast.

== Timeline ==
- April 19, 2016 - General election. The Manitoba Liberal Party wins 3 seats, up from 1, but leader Rana Bokhari places third in her own riding after a troubled campaign.
- May 7, 2016 - Bokhari announces she will not lead the Liberals into the next election but intends to remain leader until her successor is chosen.
- September 24, 2016 - Bokhari resigns as leader.
- October 21, 2016 - Judy Klassen, MLA, is chosen interim leader by the party's board of directors on the condition that she can only run for the permanent leadership if she resigns by June 20, 2017.
- April 21, 2017 - Cindy Lamoureux announces that she intends to be a candidate.
- May 15, 2017 - Nomination period opens.
- June 5, 2017 - Dougald Lamont declares his candidacy.
- June 13, 2017 - Judy Klassen resigns as interim leader to run for the permanent leadership.
- June 16, 2017 - Jon Gerrard announces his candidacy.
- July 11, 2017 - Klassen withdraws in order to help constituents in crisis.
- September 21, 2017 - Nomination period closes. Deadline to become a member in good standing of the party and be eligible to vote.
- October 21, 2017 - Leadership convention held at the Victoria Inn Conference Centre in Winnipeg; Dougald Lamont won on the second ballot.

== Candidates ==
- Jon Gerrard, MLA for River Heights (1999–2023), Leader of the Manitoba Liberal Party (1998–2013), MP for Portage—Interlake (1993–1997)
- Dougald Lamont, runner-up for the leadership in 2013, owns a digital media company, lecturer in government-business relations at the University of Winnipeg, former staffer for Liberal MP Robert-Falcon Ouellette.
- Cindy Lamoureux, MLA for Burrows (2016–present)

== Withdrawn ==
- Judy Klassen, interim leader of the Manitoba Liberal Party (2016–2017), MLA for Kewatinook (2016–present)

Date campaign launched: June 13, 2017
Date campaign ended: July 11, 2017
Subsequently endorsed: Cindy Lamoureux

== Results ==
=== First ballot ===
- Cindy Lamoureux 363
- Dougald Lamont 301
- Jon Gerrard 230

Gerrard eliminated, endorses Lamoureux

=== Second ballot ===
- Dougald Lamont 296
- Cindy Lamoureux 288

== See also ==
- Manitoba Liberal Party leadership elections
