= Fort Whyte =

Provincial electoral district in Manitoba, Canada

Coordinates: 49.830°N 97.197°W

Manitoba electoral district
- Location in Winnipeg

Provincial electoral district
- Legislature: Legislative Assembly of Manitoba
MLA
Obby Khan
Independent
- District created: 1999
- First contested: 1999
- Last contested: 2022

Demographics
- Census division: Division No. 11
- Census subdivision: Winnipeg

Fort Whyte is a provincial electoral district of Manitoba, Canada. It was created in 1999, after the provincial electoral boundaries commission determined that southwestern Winnipeg had experienced enough population growth to deserve an extra seat. Fort Whyte was created from territory formerly belonging to the divisions of Tuxedo, Fort Garry, and St. Norbert.

The current MLA for Fort Whyte is Obby Khan, a former Leader of the Opposition who currently sits as an independent following his resignation as leader of the Progressive Conservative Party. Khan succeeded fellow Progressive Conservative and former Premier of Manitoba Brian Pallister following his resignation in 2021.

== Constituency profile ==
=== Geography ===
Following Manitoba's 2018 electoral redistribution, Fort Whyte is bordered to the east by Fort Garry, to the south by Waverley, to the west by Roblin, and to the north by River Heights and Tuxedo.

=== Demographics ===
The constituency's population in 2018 was 21,780. The average family income in 2018 was $117,535. The unemployment rate is 4.9%, and 19.2% of the population is above 65 years of age. Almost 42% of the population have university degrees. Health and social services account for 13.5% of Fort Whyte's industry, with a further 10.4% in Retail Trade.

Fort Whyte is an ethnically diverse constituency, with an immigrant population of 25.6%. 6.7% of the riding's residents are East Indian, 5.6% are Chinese.

== Political history ==
The constituency has been held by the Progressive Conservative Party of Manitoba (PCs) for its entire existence, and has always been comfortably safe for that party. The riding's first Member of the Legislative Assembly (MLA), John Loewen, won it handily in 1999 even as the Tories were soundly defeated by the New Democratic Party of Manitoba in that year's provincial election, after having been in government for over eleven years. On September 23, 2005, Loewen announced that he was leaving provincial politics to seek the Liberal Party of Canada's nomination for Charleswood—St. James—Assiniboia in the federal election anticipated. He formally resigned from the legislature on September 26.

On December 13, 2005, a by-election was held to fill Loewen's seat. The winner was another Tory, Hugh McFadyen. A few months later, McFadyen became leader of the provincial PCs. McFadyen was easily re-elected in the 2007 provincial election, but was one of only four PC MLAs returned from Winnipeg. After the PCs were again defeated in 2011, McFadyen announced he would retire from politics as soon as a successor was chosen.

Former provincial MLA and federal MP Brian Pallister was elected his successor, and easily won Fort Whyte in the ensuing by-election. Pallister served as Premier of Manitoba while MLA for Fort Whyte from 2016, leading the party to a second electoral mandate in 2019, until 2021, when he resigned first as premier and later as an MLA.

A by-election to replace his vacancy was held on March 22, 2022. Obby Khan, a fellow Progressive Conservative, won the seat, defeating Liberal candidate Willard Reaves. Khan successfully won reelection in 2023.

== Members of the Legislative Assembly ==
Parliament	Years	Member	Party
Riding created from Tuxedo, Fort Garry and St. Norbert
37th	1999–2003	John Loewen	Progressive Conservative
38th	2003–2005	John Loewen	Progressive Conservative
38th	2005–2007	Hugh McFadyen	Progressive Conservative
39th	2007–2011	Hugh McFadyen	Progressive Conservative
40th	2011–2012	Hugh McFadyen	Progressive Conservative
40th	2012–2016	Brian Pallister	Progressive Conservative
41st	2016–2019	Brian Pallister	Progressive Conservative
42nd	2019–2021	Brian Pallister	Progressive Conservative
42nd	2022–2023	Obby Khan	Progressive Conservative
43rd	2023–2026	Obby Khan	Progressive Conservative
43rd	2026–present	Obby Khan	Independent

== Election results ==
2023 Manitoba general election
Party	Candidate	Votes	%	±%	Expenditures
Progressive Conservative	Obby Khan	5,442	47.87	−9.32	$45,057.75
Liberal	Willard Reaves	4,213	37.06	+19.44	$19,578.06
New Democratic	Trudy Schroeder	1,714	15.08	−2.81	$0.00
Total valid votes/expense limit		11,369	99.61	–	$66,506.00
Total rejected and declined ballots		45	0.39	–	
Turnout		11,414	64.37	+4.02	
Eligible voters		17,732			
Progressive Conservative hold		Swing		−14.38	
Source(s) Source: Elections Manitoba

Manitoba provincial by-election, March 22, 2022 Resignation of Brian Pallister
Party	Candidate	Votes	%	±%	Expenditures
Progressive Conservative	Obby Khan	3,050	42.51	-14.68	
Liberal	Willard Reaves	2,853	39.77	+22.53	
New Democratic	Trudy Schroeder	1,112	15.50	-2.38	
Independent	Patrick Allard	101	1.41	—	
Green	Nicolas Geddert	55	0.77	-6.00	
Total valid votes		7,174			
Total rejected ballots		15	0.21	-0.33	
Turnout		7,189	42.62	-14.57	
Eligible voters		15,907	—	-0.29	
Progressive Conservative hold		Swing		-18.61	
Source: Elections Manitoba

2019 Manitoba general election
Party	Candidate	Votes	%	±%	Expenditures
Progressive Conservative	Brian Pallister	5,619	57.19	-8.2	$10,131.35
New Democratic	Beatrice Bruske	1,757	17.88	+2.2	$106.40
Liberal	Darrel Morin	1,731	17.62	+6.2	$545.68
Green	Sara Campbell	665	6.77	-0.4	$0.00
Manitoba First	Jason Holenski	54	0.55	-1.1	$1,210.90
Total valid votes		9,826	99.36		
Total rejected ballots		63	0.64	–	
Turnout		9,889	60.35	–	
Eligible voters		16,386			
Progressive Conservative hold		Swing		-5.2	
Source: Elections Manitoba

2016 provincial election redistributed results
Party	%
Progressive Conservative	65.4
New Democratic	15.7
Liberal	11.4
Green	7.2
Manitoba	1.3

2016 Manitoba general election
Party	Candidate	Votes	%	±%	Expenditures
Progressive Conservative	Brian Pallister	6,775	64.18	+8.96	$14,965.48
New Democratic	George Wong	1,718	16.28	+5.02	$18,573.44
Liberal	Peter Bastians	1,205	11.42	-20.10	$8,194.92
Green	Carli Runions	731	6.92	+5.20	$10.00
Manitoba	Daryl Newis	127	1.20		$920.97
Total valid votes/expense limit		10,556	98.79		$54,710.00
Total rejected ballots		129	1.21	+1.06	
Turnout		10,685	60.71	+19.07	
Eligible voters		17,599			
Progressive Conservative hold		Swing		+1.97	
Source: Elections Manitoba

Manitoba provincial by-election, September 4, 2012 Resignation of Hugh McFadyen
Party	Candidate	Votes	%	±%	Expenditures
Progressive Conservative	Brian Pallister	3,626	55.22	-7.22	$32,215.06
Liberal	Bob Axworthy	2,069	31.51	+23.59	$28,872.72
New Democratic	Brandy Schmidt	739	11.25	-18.38	$10,860.67
Green	Donnie Benham	113	1.72	–	$789.44
Independent	Darrell Ackman	19	0.29		211.37
Total valid votes		6,566	99.85		
Total rejected ballots		10	0.15	-0.34	
Turnout		6,576	41.64	-20.27	
Eligible voters		15,792	–		
Progressive Conservative hold		Swing		-15.40	

2011 Manitoba general election
Party	Candidate	Votes	%	±%	Expenditures
Progressive Conservative	Hugh McFadyen	5,594	62.44	+10.49	$23,755.75
New Democratic	Sunny Dhaliwal	2,655	29.64	−4.20	$99.38
Liberal	Chae Tsai	710	7.92	−6.29	$829.64
Total valid votes		8,959	99.51		
Rejected and declined votes		44	0.49	+0.16	
Turnout		9,003	61.91	+2.76	
Electors on the lists		14,542			
Progressive Conservative hold		Swing		+7.34	
Source: Elections Manitoba

* Percent change is not based on redistributed results

2007 Manitoba general election
Party	Candidate	Votes	%	±%	Expenditures
Progressive Conservative	Hugh McFadyen	5,981	51.95	−0.31	$20,363.37
New Democratic	Sunny Dhaliwal	3,895	33.83	+9.40	$5,331.36
Liberal	Angelina Olivier-Job	1,637	14.22	−7.41	$2,162.37
Total valid votes		11,513	99.67		
Rejected and declined votes		38	0.33	+0.24	
Turnout		11,551	59.15	+21.08	
Electors on the lists		19,527			
Progressive Conservative hold		Swing		-4.90	

Manitoba provincial by-election, December 16, 2005 Resignation of John Loewen
Party	Candidate	Votes	%	±%	Expenditures
Progressive Conservative	Hugh McFadyen	3,542	52.26	−0.45	$27,219.00
New Democratic	Christina McDonald	1,650	24.34	−3.79	$18,333.89
Liberal	Jean Paterson	1,466	21.63	+2.47	$6,134.47
Green	Shelagh Pizey-Allen	120	1.77	–	$233.71
Total valid votes		6,778	99.91		
Rejected ballots		6	0.09	-0.17	
Turnout		6,784	38.07	−18.54	
Registered voters		17,820			
Progressive Conservative hold		Swing		+1.67	

2003 Manitoba general election
Party	Candidate	Votes	%	±%	Expenditures
Progressive Conservative	John Loewen	4,960	52.71	−9.02	$13,693.53
New Democratic	Janine Ballingall Scotten	2,647	28.13	+1.31	$18,368.88
Liberal	Gerry Sankar	1,803	19.16	+7.71	$14,257.51
Total valid votes		9,410	99.75		
Rejected and declined votes		24	0.25	-0.37	
Turnout		9,434	56.61	−19.81	
Electors on the lists		16,664			
Progressive Conservative hold		Swing		-5.17	

1999 Manitoba general election
Party	Candidate	Votes	%	Expenditures
Progressive Conservative	John Loewen	6,480	61.73	$25,444.88
New Democratic	Bidhu Jha	2,815	26.82	$24,511.00
Liberal	Malli Aulakh	1,202	11.45	$18,808.08
Total valid votes		10,497	99.38	
Rejected and declined votes		66	0.62	
Turnout		10,563	76.43	
Registered voters		13,821		

== Previous boundaries ==
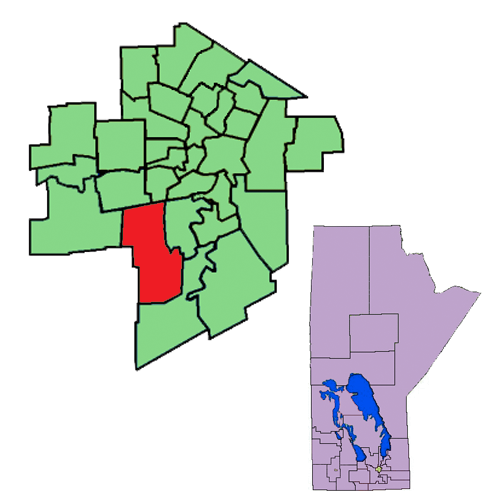
The 1999–2011 boundaries of the riding of Fort Whyte highlighted in red.

== See also ==
- List of Manitoba provincial electoral districts
- Canadian provincial electoral districts
