= Ted Marcelino =

Canadian politician

Member of the Legislative Assembly of Manitoba for Tyndall Park
- In office October 4, 2011 – August 12, 2019
- Preceded by: Riding established
- Succeeded by: Cindy Lamoureux

Personal details
- Born: 1946 or 1947 (age 79–80) Philippines
- Party: New Democrat

Ted Marcelino (born c. 1947) is a Canadian politician, who was elected to the Legislative Assembly of Manitoba in the 2011 election. A member of the New Democratic Party, he was the first member of the Legislative Assembly for the electoral district of Tyndall Park. He represented it from its creation at the 2011 election until he was defeated in the 2019 election.

He is the brother-in-law of his former caucus colleague Flor Marcelino.

== Electoral record ==
2019 Manitoba general election: Tyndall Park
| Party | Candidate | Votes | % | ±% | Expenditures |
|---|---|---|---|---|---|
| Liberal | Cindy Lamoureux | 4,301 | 54.29 | +24.1 | $20,300.22 |
| New Democratic | Ted Marcelino | 2,403 | 30.95 | -8.0 | $24,073.41 |
| Progressive Conservative | Daljit Kainth | 984 | 12.53 | -11.3 | $24,220.96 |
| Green | Fleur Mann | 157 | 1.95 | -5.2 | $0.00 |
| Communist | Frank Komarniski | 22 | 0.28 | +0.3 | $310.80 |
| Total valid votes | | 7,933 | 100.0 | | |
| Total rejected ballots | | 63 | 0.8 | | |
| Turnout | | | 58.5 | | |
| Eligible voters | | 14,068 | | | |
| Liberal gain from New Democratic | | Swing | | +16.1 | |

2016 Manitoba general election: Tyndall Park
| Party | Candidate | Votes | % | ±% | Expenditures |
|---|---|---|---|---|---|
| New Democratic | Ted Marcelino | 2,139 | 38.94 | -5.99 | $23,807.96 |
| Liberal | Aida Champagne | 1,656 | 30.15 | -4.79 | $15,961.31 |
| Progressive Conservative | Naseer Warraich | 1,306 | 23.78 | +7.99 | $20,975.39 |
| Green | Shane Neustaeter | 391 | 7.11 | +2.99 | $0.00 |
| Total valid votes/expense limit | | 5,492 | 100.0 | | $34,821.00 |
| Declined and rejected ballots | | 56 | – | – | |
| Turnout | | 5,548 | 53.40 | – | |
| Eligible voters | | 10,390 | | | |
Source: Elections Manitoba

2011 Manitoba general election: Tyndall Park
| Party | Candidate | Votes | % | Expenditures |
|---|---|---|---|---|
| New Democratic | Ted Marcelino | 2,596 | 44.93 | $26,758.75 |
| Liberal | Roldan Sevillano Jr. | 2,007 | 34.94 | $31,263.05 |
| Progressive Conservative | Cris Aglugub | 908 | 15.79 | $20,016.16 |
| Green | Dean Koshelanyk | 237 | 4.12 | $1,361.21 |
