= Manitoba Party =

- Leader: Wayne Sturby
- Founders: Wayne Sturby; Joe Chan
- Founded: August 27, 2019
- Dissolved: October 10, 2023
- Split from: Manitoba First
- Headquarters: 5 Pioneers Trail Unit 5 Lorette, MB R5K 0Y7
- Ideology: Right-wing populism
- Colours: Yellow and green
- Seats in Legislature: 0 / 57

Website
- www.manitobaparty.ca

The Manitoba Party is a defunct provincial political party. It was registered by Elections Manitoba on August 27, 2019, and originally called the Manitoba Forward Party.

On December 22, 2020, the party changed its name from the Manitoba Forward Party to the Manitoba Party.

The party leader was Wayne Sturby, who was previously part of the former Manitoba Party until it was taken over by Steven Fletcher and later rebranded as Manitoba First. Sturby has also been involved with the People's Party of Canada, unsuccessfully running as their candidate in Provencher in 2019.

The party failed to nominate any candidates in the 2023 election, and was deregistered by Elections Manitoba on October 10, 2023.

== History ==
The Manitoba Forward Party was founded by Joe Chan and Wayne Sturby, who were former members of the previous Manitoba Party.

The party's platform in the 2019 general election focused on public safety, reducing the PST to five percent, cancelling photo radar, and cutting business taxes. It ran 7 candidates, garnering 1,339 votes, or 0.28 percent of the total vote. The best result for the party was in Burrows, where Edda Pangilinan received 15.88% of the vote.

The party advocated for smaller government, and individual freedoms, and opposed restrictions during the COVID-19 pandemic.

== Party principles ==
The party has a 9-point list of party principles as follows:

- Protection of individual freedoms
- Respect the Charter of Rights and Freedoms
- Smaller, less intrusive, more efficient government
- Steady, gradual reduction in government spending and commitment to balanced budgets
- High-quality and efficient health care system
- Reducing regulation, taxation, and red tape
- Reform the education system
- Reform the justice system
- Democratic reform

== Election results ==
Election	Banner	Leader	Votes	%	Swing	Seats	% Seats	+/–	Rank	Status
2019	Manitoba Forward Party	Wayne Sturby	1,339	0.28	New Party	0 / 57	0	-	5th	Extra-parliamentary
