= James Allum =

Canadian politician

Manitoba Minister of Justice and Attorney General
- In office November 3, 2014 – April 29, 2015
- Premier: Greg Selinger
- Preceded by: Andrew Swan
- Succeeded by: Gord Mackintosh

Manitoba Minister of Education and Advanced Learning
- In office October 18, 2013 – November 3, 2014
- Premier: Greg Selinger
- Preceded by: new portfolio

Member of the Legislative Assembly of Manitoba for Fort Garry-Riverview
- In office October 4, 2011 – August 12, 2019
- Preceded by: Riding Established
- Succeeded by: riding dissolved

Personal details
- Party: New Democratic Party
- Education: Trent University; Queen's University

James Allum is a Canadian politician, who was elected to the Legislative Assembly of Manitoba in the 2011 election. He represented the electoral district of Fort Garry-Riverview as a member of the New Democratic Party of Manitoba caucus.

On November 3, 2014, Allum was appointed as Minister of Justice after then-minister Andrew Swan, along with four other ministers, resigned from cabinet over concerns about Premier Greg Selinger's leadership.

Allum announced in late 2018 that he would not run in the next provincial election (which was expected in 2020 but was held in 2019 instead), wherein Fort Garry-Riverview was due to be abolished by electoral redistribution. Allum is the only MLA for Fort Garry-Riverview.

== Electoral record ==
2016 Manitoba general election: Fort Garry-Riverview
Party	Candidate	Votes	%	±%	Expenditures
New Democratic	James Allum	3,450	37.84	-17.71	$35,643.17
Progressive Conservative	Jeannette Montufar	3,149	34.54	1.59	$33,993.08
Green	James Beddome	1,711	18.77	14.46	$6,131.49
Liberal	Johanna Wood	807	8.85	1.66	$3,744.00
Total valid votes		9,117	–	–	
Rejected		68	–		
Eligible voters / turnout		13,402	68.53	3.48	
Source(s) Source: Manitoba. Chief Electoral Officer (2016). Statement of Votes for the 41st Provincial General Election, April 19, 2016 (PDF) (Report). Winnipeg: Elections Manitoba. "Election Returns: 41st General Election". Elections Manitoba. 2016.

2011 Manitoba general election: Fort Garry-Riverview
Party	Candidate	Votes	%	Expenditures
New Democratic	James Allum	5,146	55.55	$22,627.28
Progressive Conservative	Ian Rabb	3,052	32.95	$38,526.52
Liberal	Kevin Freedman	666	7.19	$10,837.14
Green	Daniel Backe	399	4.31	$22.70
Total valid votes		9,263	–	
Rejected		45	–	
Eligible voters / turnout		14,307	65.06	
Source(s) Source: Manitoba. Chief Electoral Officer (2011). Statement of Votes for the 40th Provincial General Election, October 4, 2011 (PDF) (Report). Winnipeg: Elections Manitoba. "Election Returns: 40th General Election". Elections Manitoba. 2011.
