= St. Paul (Manitoba electoral district) =

Defunct provincial electoral district in Manitoba, Canada

Coordinates: 50.008°N 96.993°W

Manitoba electoral district
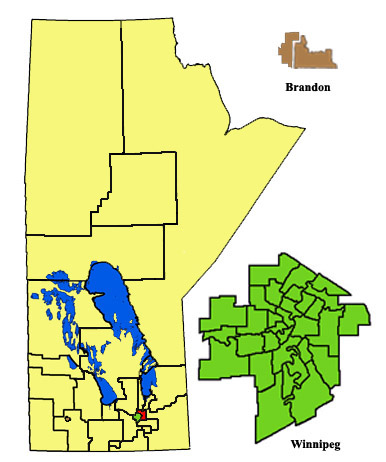

Defunct provincial electoral district
- Legislature: Legislative Assembly of Manitoba
- District created: 2008
- First contested: 2011
- Last contested: 2016

St. Paul is a provincial electoral district of Manitoba, Canada. It was created by electoral redistribution in 2008 mostly out of the old Springfield riding.

Communities in the riding include the Rural Municipality of East St. Paul, West St. Paul, Oakbank, and Dugald. The 2006 census population was 19,995.

== Members of the Legislative Assembly ==
Assembly	Years	Member	Party
40th	2011-2016	Ron Schuler	Progressive Conservative
41st	2016-2019	Ron Schuler	Progressive Conservative

== Electoral results ==
=== 2011 ===
2011 Manitoba general election
Party	Candidate	Votes	%	Expenditures
Progressive Conservative	Ron Schuler	5,554	59.59	$31,993.34
New Democratic	Cynthia Ryan	3,491	37.45	$18,456.72
Liberal	Ludolf R. Grolle	276	2.96	$462.91
Total valid votes		9,321	–	
Rejected		48	–	
Eligible voters / turnout		16,075	58.28	
Source(s) Source: Manitoba. Chief Electoral Officer (2011). Statement of Votes for the 40th Provincial General Election, October 4, 2011 (PDF) (Report). Winnipeg: Elections Manitoba. "Election Returns: 40th General Election". Elections Manitoba. 2011.

=== 2016 ===
2016 Manitoba general election
Party	Candidate	Votes	%	±%	Expenditures
Progressive Conservative	Ron Schuler	7,091	71.60	12.02	$26,021.09
New Democratic	Andrew Podolecki	1,757	17.74	-19.71	$5,710.34
Liberal	Pete Sanderson	1,055	10.65	7.69	$8,519.18
Total valid votes		9,903	–	–	
Rejected		203	–		
Eligible voters / turnout		16,536	61.12	2.83	
Source(s) Source: Manitoba. Chief Electoral Officer (2016). Statement of Votes for the 41st Provincial General Election, April 19, 2016 (PDF) (Report). Winnipeg: Elections Manitoba. "Election Returns: 41st General Election". Elections Manitoba. 2016.

== See also ==
- List of Manitoba provincial electoral districts
- Canadian provincial electoral districts
