= Fort Garry-Riverview =

Defunct provincial electoral district in Manitoba, Canada

Coordinates: 49.844°N 97.151°W

Manitoba electoral district
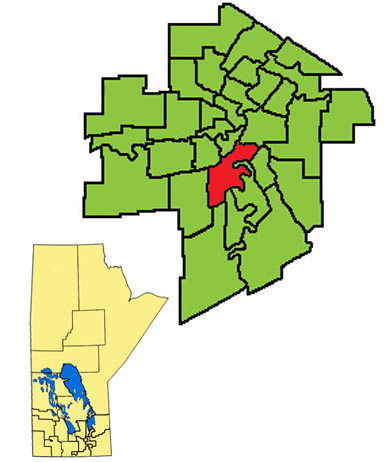

Defunct provincial electoral district
- Legislature: Legislative Assembly of Manitoba
- District created: 2008
- First contested: 2011
- Last contested: 2016

Fort Garry-Riverview, located in south-central Winnipeg, was a provincial electoral district of Manitoba, Canada. It was created by the decennial electoral redistribution in 2008, out of parts of Lord Roberts and Fort Garry.

It bordered the ridings of St. Norbert, Fort Richmond, Riel, St. Vital, St. Boniface, Fort Rouge, River Heights, and Fort Whyte. The riding's population in 2006 was 20,365.

Fort Garry-Riverview was eliminated by redistribution in 2018. Its territory went to the re-created Fort Garry and Fort Rouge.

== Members of the Legislative Assembly ==
Assembly	Years	Member	Party
40th	2011–2016	James Allum	New Democratic
41st	2016–2019	James Allum	New Democratic

== Electoral results ==
=== 2011 ===
2011 Manitoba general election
Party	Candidate	Votes	%	Expenditures
New Democratic	James Allum	5,146	55.55	$22,627.28
Progressive Conservative	Ian Rabb	3,052	32.95	$38,526.52
Liberal	Kevin Freedman	666	7.19	$10,837.14
Green	Daniel Backe	399	4.31	$22.70
Total valid votes		9,263	–	
Rejected		45	–	
Eligible voters / turnout		14,307	65.06	
Source(s) Source: Manitoba. Chief Electoral Officer (2011). Statement of Votes for the 40th Provincial General Election, October 4, 2011 (PDF) (Report). Winnipeg: Elections Manitoba. "Election Returns: 40th General Election". Elections Manitoba. 2011.

=== 2016 ===
2016 Manitoba general election
Party	Candidate	Votes	%	±%	Expenditures
New Democratic	James Allum	3,450	37.84	-17.71	$35,643.17
Progressive Conservative	Jeannette Montufar	3,149	34.54	1.59	$33,993.08
Green	James Beddome	1,711	18.77	14.46	$6,131.49
Liberal	Johanna Wood	807	8.85	1.66	$3,744.00
Total valid votes		9,117	–	–	
Rejected		68	–		
Eligible voters / turnout		13,402	68.53	3.48	
Source(s) Source: Manitoba. Chief Electoral Officer (2016). Statement of Votes for the 41st Provincial General Election, April 19, 2016 (PDF) (Report). Winnipeg: Elections Manitoba. "Election Returns: 41st General Election". Elections Manitoba. 2016.

== See also ==
- List of Manitoba provincial electoral districts
- Canadian provincial electoral districts
