= Tyndall Park (electoral district) =

Provincial electoral district in Manitoba, Canada

Coordinates: 49.937°N 97.208°W

Manitoba electoral district
- Location in Winnipeg

Provincial electoral district
- Legislature: Legislative Assembly of Manitoba
MLA
Cindy Lamoureux
Liberal
- District created: 2008
- First contested: 2011
- Last contested: 2023

Demographics
- Population (2016): 21,455
- Electors (2019): 14,068
- Area (km²): 11
- Pop. density (per km²): 1,950.5

Tyndall Park is a provincial electoral district of Manitoba, Canada. It was created by redistribution in 2008 from parts of Inkster, Wellington, and St. James electoral districts. The riding's population, according to the 2006 census, was 20,950. Following the 2018 Manitoba electoral redistribution, Tyndall Park is bordered to the east by Burrows, to the south by Notre Dame, to the north by The Maples, and to the west by the rural riding of Lakeside.

The riding contains the northwest Winnipeg neighbourhoods of Brooklands, Weston, and namesake Tyndall Park.

== Members of the Legislative Assembly ==
Name	Party	Took office	Left office
Ted Marcelino	NDP	2011	2019
Cindy Lamoureux	Liberal	2019	present

== Electoral results ==
2023 Manitoba general election
Party	Candidate	Votes	%	±%	Expenditures
Liberal	Cindy Lamoureux	4,030	54.99	+0.78	$15,618.38
New Democratic	Kelly Legaspi	1,908	26.04	-4.25	$2,769.87
Progressive Conservative	Chris Santos	1,390	18.97	+6.56	$11,003.48
Total valid votes/expense limit		7,328	99.58	–	$57,655.00
Total rejected and declined ballots		31	0.42	–	
Turnout		7,359	49.75	-7.09	
Eligible voters		14,793			
Liberal hold		Swing		+2.52	
Source(s) Source: Elections Manitoba

2019 Manitoba general election
Party	Candidate	Votes	%	±%	Expenditures
Liberal	Cindy Lamoureux	4,301	54.29	+24.1	$20,300.22
New Democratic	Ted Marcelino	2,403	30.95	-8.0	$24,073.41
Progressive Conservative	Daljit Kainth	984	12.53	-11.3	$24,220.96
Green	Fleur Mann	157	1.95	-5.2	$0.00
Communist	Frank Komarniski	22	0.28	+0.3	$310.80
Total valid votes		7,933	100.0		
Total rejected ballots		63	0.8		
Turnout			58.5		
Eligible voters		14,068			
Liberal gain from New Democratic		Swing		+16.1	

2016 provincial election redistributed results
Party	%
New Democratic	36.3
Liberal	31.4
Progressive Conservative	25.7
Green	6.5
Communist	0.1

2016 Manitoba general election
Party	Candidate	Votes	%	±%	Expenditures
New Democratic	Ted Marcelino	2,139	38.94	-5.99	$23,807.96
Liberal	Aida Champagne	1,656	30.15	-4.79	$15,961.31
Progressive Conservative	Naseer Warraich	1,306	23.78	+7.99	$20,975.39
Green	Shane Neustaeter	391	7.11	+2.99	$0.00
Total valid votes/expense limit		5,492	100.0		$34,821.00
Declined and rejected ballots		56	–	–	
Turnout		5,548	53.40	–	
Eligible voters		10,390			
Source: Elections Manitoba

2011 Manitoba general election
Party	Candidate	Votes	%	Expenditures
New Democratic	Ted Marcelino	2,596	44.93	$26,758.75
Liberal	Roldan Sevillano Jr.	2,007	34.94	$31,263.05
Progressive Conservative	Cris Aglugub	908	15.79	$20,016.16
Green	Dean Koshelanyk	237	4.12	$1,361.21

== See also ==
- List of Manitoba provincial electoral districts
- Canadian provincial electoral districts
