= Manitoba First =

Manitoba First Manitoba D'abord
- Defunct provincial party
- Founders: Gary Marshall; John Sneisen
- Founded: January 21, 2016
- Registered: March 24, 2016
- Dissolved: March 3, 2022
- Ideology: Right-libertarianism
- Political position: Right-wing
- Colours: Blue; green
- Seats in Legislature: 0 / 57

Manitoba First (French: Manitoba D'abord) was a provincial political party in the Canadian province of Manitoba that was originally called the Manitoba Party.

== History ==
The Manitoba Party was founded in January 2016 by Gary Marshall and John Sneisen. The party first named Taz Stuart the interim leader.

Stuart resigned as interim leader on February 4, 2016, less than a month into the role.

The party was registered by Elections Manitoba on March 24, 2016, with Gary Marshall becoming leader.

It ran 16 candidates in the 2016 general election, garnering 4,887 votes, or 1.1 per cent of the total vote. The party placed second in Arthur-Virden and Spruce Woods.

On August 13, 2018, then-independent MLA Steven Fletcher joined the Manitoba Party. On September 11, 2018, Fletcher became leader of the Manitoba Party, despite the protestations of previous board members who claimed they were unaware of Fletcher's plans. Two of these former board members filed court documents in December 2018, seeking Fletcher's ouster after claiming that the previous leader, Gary Marshall, "gave" Fletcher the leadership without authority, as Marshall had been removed as party leader following a unanimous vote during a board meeting in July 2018. Marshall claimed the board meeting never occurred, while Fletcher maintains he knew nothing about any internal disputes, and that the leadership change was done in accordance with the law.

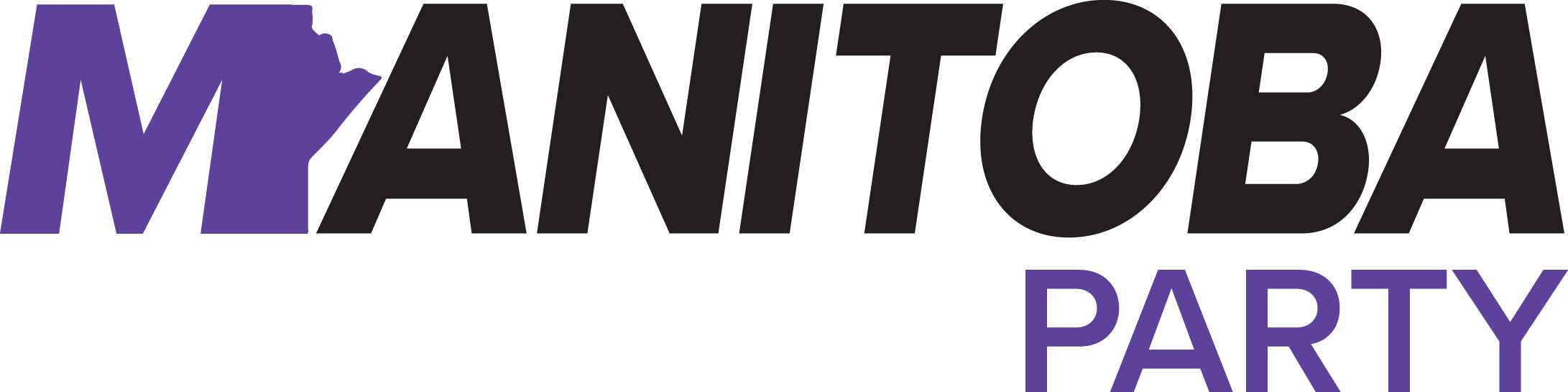
The party logo used when Steven Fletcher became leader in September 2018 until the party rebranded as Manitoba First in August 2019

On May 22, 2019, Fletcher announced he would be running in the 2019 Canadian federal election as a candidate for the People's Party of Canada. He ran in the federal riding of Charleswood—St. James—Assiniboia—Headingley, which he had previously represented from 2004 to 2015 as a member of the Conservative Party of Canada. Subsequently, Fletcher resigned as leader of the party and David Sutherland, 2016 candidate in the riding of Dawson Trail, was listed as leader.

On August 6, 2019, the party changed its name to Manitoba First and Douglas Petrick was listed as the new leader. In the 2019 election, the party won no seats.

The party deregistered on March 3, 2022.

== 2016 platform ==
In an interview with the Canadian Broadcasting Corporation in January 2016, founder Gary Marshall stated that the new party was "...a party of tax cuts". Its platform included a pledge to lower the provincial sales tax rate to 5 per cent from 8 percent, removal of PST charges on all food purchases, and changing the personal and business income tax rates to a flat 10 per cent, among other proposals.

The party also proposed to remove all red light and speed cameras from intersections and mobile units, eradicate government regulations "that impede trade and commerce", and changing how tax revenues are allocated among education, municipalities, and so on.

== Party leaders ==
The original party logo under the Manitoba Party name used in the 2016 election

Leader	Term of office	Notes
Manitoba Party
Taz Stuart	January 21, 2016 – February 4, 2016	Interim leader
Gary Marshall	March 24, 2016 – July 2018	
Steven Fletcher	September 11, 2018 – May 22, 2019	
David Sutherland	June 2, 2019 – August 6, 2019	
Manitoba First
Douglas Petrick	August 6, 2019 – March 3, 2022	

== Former MLAs ==
Member	District	Tenure	Notes
Steven Fletcher	Assiniboia	2018—2019	Previously served as a PC MLA 2016–2017 and an independent 2017–2018

== Election results ==
Election	Banner	Leader	Votes	%	Swing	Seats	% seats	+/–	Rank	Status
2016	Manitoba Party	Gary Marshall	4,887	1.1	New party	0 / 57	0	Steady	5th	Extra-parliamentary
2019	Manitoba First	Douglas Petrick	647	0.1	▼1.0	0 / 57	0	Steady	6th	Extra-parliamentary
