= 2016 Manitoba general election =

- April 19, 2016

57 seats of the Legislative Assembly of Manitoba 29 seats needed for a majority
- Turnout: 57.43%
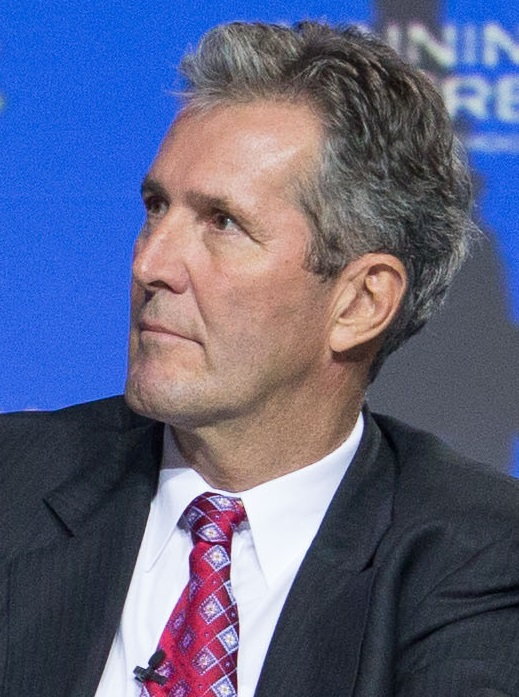

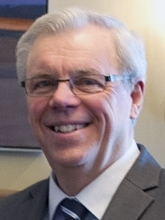

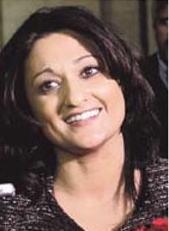

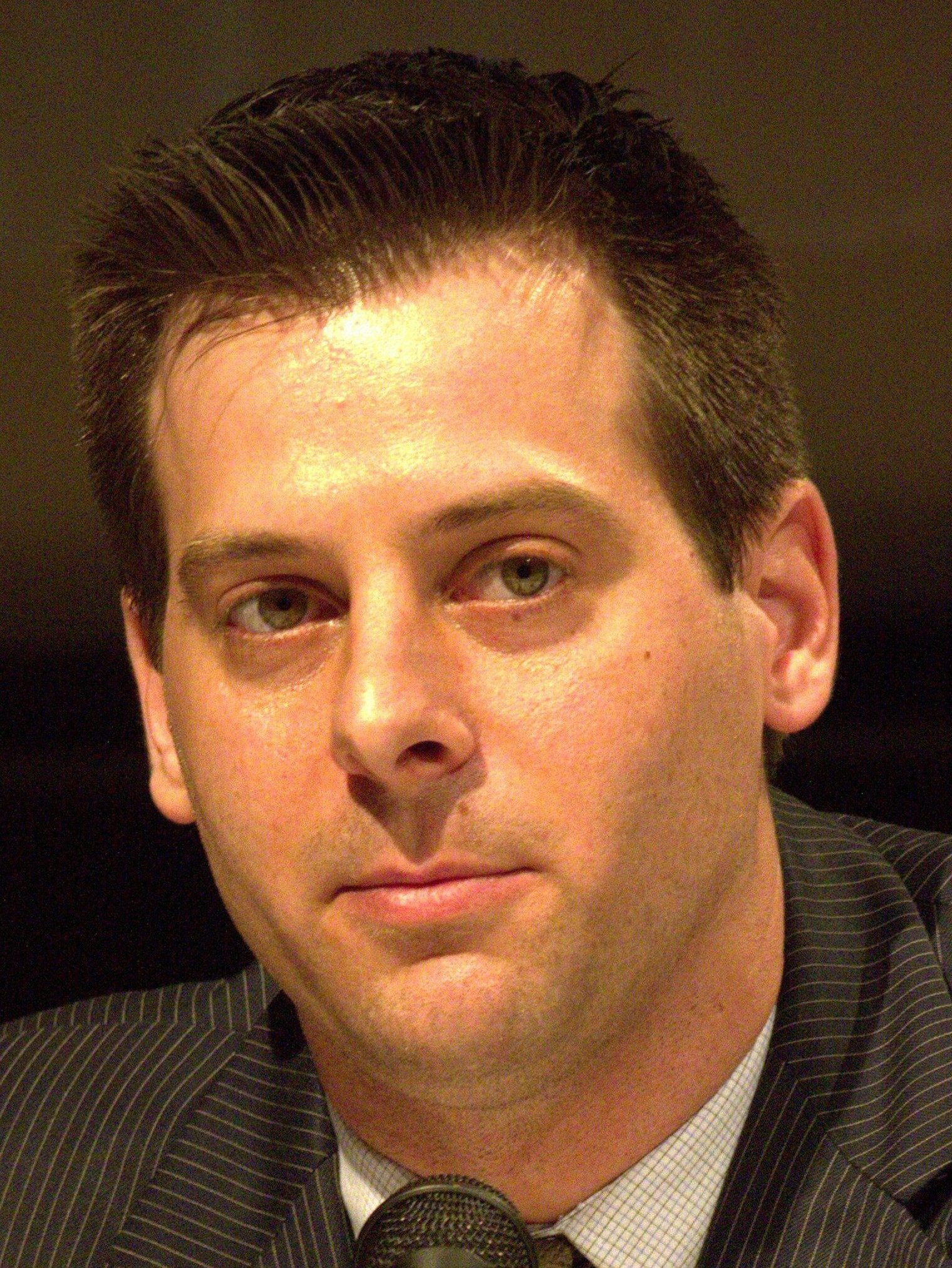
	First party	Second party
Leader	Brian Pallister	Greg Selinger
Party	Progressive Conservative	New Democratic
Leader since	July 30, 2012	October 17, 2009
Leader's seat	Fort Whyte	St. Boniface
Last election	19 seats, 43.71%	37 seats, 46.16%
Seats before	19	35
Seats won	40	14
Seat change	▲21	▼21
Popular vote	232,215	112,748
Percentage	53.10%	25.78%
Swing	▲9.39%	▼20.38%
	Third party	Fourth party
Leader	Rana Bokhari	James Beddome
Party	Liberal	Green
Leader since	October 26, 2013	November 15, 2014
Leader's seat	ran in Fort Rouge (lost)	ran in Fort Garry-Riverview (lost)
Last election	1 seat, 7.52%	0 seats, 2.52%
Seats before	1	0
Seats won	3	0
Seat change	▲2	Steady
Popular vote	62,973	22,188
Percentage	14.40%	5.07%
Swing	▲6.88%	▲2.62%
- Popular vote by riding. As this is an FPTP election, seat totals are not determined by popular vote, but instead via results by each riding.
Premier before election
Greg Selinger
New Democratic
Premier after election
Brian Pallister
Progressive Conservative

The 2016 Manitoba general election was held on April 19, 2016, to elect members to the Legislative Assembly of Manitoba, Canada. The New Democratic Party of Manitoba, led by Greg Selinger, were defeated by the Progressive Conservative Party of Manitoba led by Brian Pallister, ending nearly 17 years of NDP government. The Progressive Conservatives won 40 seats, one of the largest majority governments in Manitoba history, the other one was in 1915 when Liberals also won 40 seats.

The election also removed one of the two New Democratic governments in the country, the other being formed by the Alberta New Democratic Party.

== Date ==
Under the Manitoba Elections Act, the general election is to be held on the first Tuesday of October in the fourth calendar year, following the previous election. As the last election was held in 2011, that date would be October 6, 2015. However, the act also provides that if, as of January 1 of the election year, the election period would overlap with a federal election period, the provincial election is to be postponed until the third Tuesday of the following April. Under the federal fixed-term act, on January 1, 2015, the next federal election was tentatively scheduled for October 19, 2015, overlapping election periods by approximately three weeks. Thus the next Manitoba election was scheduled for April 19, 2016. The Lieutenant Governor retains the power to dissolve the Legislative Assembly early. The legislature was dissolved and writs for the election were dropped on March 16, 2016.

== Campaign ==
The election was relatively unique within Canadian politics, in that opinion polling indicated that most voters were basing their decision on the local candidate in their riding or the party platform, not the performance of the leader. In most Canadian elections, such as the 2016 Saskatchewan election, the behaviour of the party leader was a stronger motivator for constituents when voting; in the context of the Manitoba election, however, polling found that none of the three main party leaders was particularly well-liked or trusted by the electorate. Although Pallister fared best with 33 per cent support in public opinion polling on the question of preferred premier, even he finished only one point ahead of "none of the above" at 32 per cent.

The campaigns of all three parties were based on themes of change, with even Selinger suggesting the incumbent NDP government would be able to respond to constituent concerns and change problematic policies in the leaders' debate. Opinion polling during the campaign suggested a lack of enthusiasm for all party leaders, and a general desire for change.

== Incumbents not contesting their seats ==
Retiring incumbents
Party	Riding	Incumbent
NDP		
NDP	Assiniboia	Jim Rondeau
NDP	Dauphin	Stan Struthers
NDP	Dawson Trail	Ron Lemieux
NDP	Fort Rouge	Jennifer Howard
NDP	Radisson	Bidhu Jha
NDP	St. Johns	Gord Mackintosh
NDP	St. Vital	Nancy Allan
NDP	Seine River	Theresa Oswald
NDP	Transcona	Daryl Reid
Progressive Conservative		
Progressive Conservative	Agassiz	Stu Briese
Progressive Conservative	Riding Mountain	Leanne Rowat
Progressive Conservative	River East	Bonnie Mitchelson

== Opinion polls ==
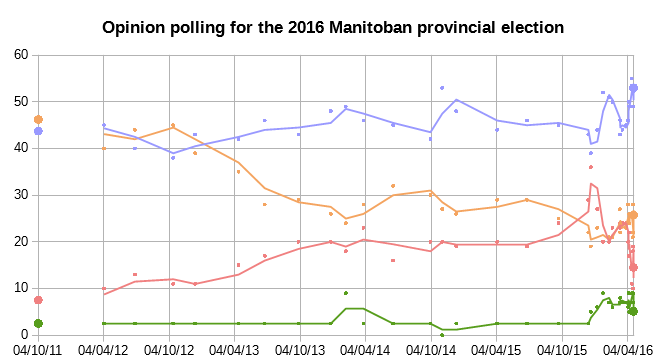
NDP Progressive Conservative Liberal Green

Polling firm	Last date of polling	Link	NDP	PC	Liberal	Green	Other
Insights West	April 18, 2016		28	53	10	7	1
Insightrix Research	April 18, 2016		22	49	19	9	1
Forum Research	April 17, 2016	(Note: Progressive Conservatives to take more than half the vote Forum Research Inc.)	21	52	18	9	
Mainstreet Research	April 14, 2016		26	55	11	9	
Insights West	April 7, 2016		26	49	17	7	1
Insightrix Research	April 7, 2016		24	49	22	5	
Mainstreet Research	April 5, 2016		24	50	17	9	
Probe Research Inc	April 4, 2016	(Note: "Archived copy" (PDF). Archived from the original (PDF) on April 18, 2016.)	28	46	20	6	
Mainstreet Research	March 29, 2016		23	45	24	7	
Mainstreet Research	March 19, 2016		24	44	24	7	
Forum Research	March 13, 2016		22	46	23	8	1
Mainstreet Research	March 12, 2016		27	43	24	7	
Mainstreet Research	February 20, 2016		21	50	23	6	
Mainstreet Research	February 11, 2016		21	51	20	7	
Mainstreet Research	January 25, 2016		20	52	20	9	
Mainstreet Research	January 9, 2016		23	44	27	6	
Insightrix Research	December 22, 2015		19	39	36	5	1
Probe Research Inc	December 15, 2015	(Note: "Archived copy" (PDF). Archived from the original (PDF) on January 23, 2016.)	22	43	29		6
Probe Research Inc	September 23, 2015	(Note: "Archived copy" (PDF). Archived from the original (PDF) on October 1, 2015.)	25	45	24		5
Probe Research Inc	June 27, 2015	(Note: "Archived copy" (PDF). Archived from the original (PDF) on September 24, 2015.)	29	46	19		5
Probe Research Inc	April 5, 2015	(Note: "Archived copy" (PDF). Archived from the original (PDF) on March 4, 2016.)	29	44	20		7
Probe Research Inc	December 12, 2014	HTML	26	48	19		7
Mainstreet Research	November 3, 2014		27	53	20		
Probe Research Inc	October 1, 2014		30	42	20		8
Probe Research Inc	June 19, 2014	HTML	32	45	16		7
Probe Research Inc	March 28, 2014		28	46	23		3
Insightrix Research	February 7, 2014		24	49	18	9	
Probe Research Inc	December 27, 2013	(Note: "Archived copy" (PDF). Archived from the original (PDF) on December 27, 2013.)	26	48	20		6
Probe Research Inc	September 28, 2013		29	43	20		8
Probe Research Inc	June 26, 2013	(Note: "Archived copy" (PDF). Archived from the original (PDF) on February 1, 2014.)	28	46	17		10
Probe Research Inc	April 14, 2013	(Note: "Archived copy" (PDF). Archived from the original (PDF) on September 19, 2014.)	35	42	15		8
Probe Research Inc	December 14, 2012		39	43	11		7
Probe Research Inc	October 14, 2012	(Note: "Archived copy" (PDF). Archived from the original (PDF) on March 3, 2016.)	45	38	11		6
Probe Research Inc	June 29, 2012	(Note: "Archived copy" (PDF). Archived from the original (PDF) on March 12, 2016.)	44	40	13		3
Probe Research Inc	April 4, 2012	(Note: "Archived copy" (PDF). Archived from the original (PDF) on March 3, 2016.)	40	45	10		5
2011 election	October 4, 2011		46.2	43.7	7.5	2.5	0.1
Polling firm	Last date of polling	Link					Other
Polling firm	Last date of polling	Link	NDP	PC	Liberal	Green	Other

== Results ==
The Tories went into the election as heavy favourites, having led opinion polls for almost four years. They scored a near-sweep of rural southern and central Manitoba, and also made significant inroads in Winnipeg, taking every seat in the southern and western portions of the capital. In many cases, previously safe NDP seats either fell to the Tories or saw the NDP margins cut by more than half.

Summary of the April 19, 2016 Manitoba Legislature election
Party	Leader	Candidates	Seats				Popular vote		
Party	Leader	Candidates	2011	Dissol.	2016	+/-	Votes	%	% change
Progressive Conservative	Brian Pallister	57	19	19	40	+21	232,215	53.10	+9.39
New Democratic	Greg Selinger	57	37	35	14	-21	112,748	25.78	−20.38
Liberal	Rana Bokhari	51	1	1	3	+2	62,973	14.40	+6.88
Green	James Beddome	30	–	–	–	–	22,188	5.07	+2.55
Manitoba	Gary Marshall	16	–	–	–	–	4,887	1.12	n/a
Communist	Darrell Rankin	6	–	–	–	–	305	0.07	+0.03
Independents		4	–	–	–	–	2,032	0.46	+0.41
Vacant (Note: Erin Selby (Southdale) and Peter Bjornson (Gimli) resigned their seats in 2015. No by-elections were called and their seats remained vacant.)				2					
**Total**		221	**57**	**57**	**57**		**437,348**		

=== Vote and seat summaries ===
Ternary plots – shift of electoral support (2011–2016)
2011

2016
Electoral districts identified by colours of winning parties

Popular vote
PC	53.10%
New Democratic	25.78%
Liberal	14.40%
Green	5.07%
Others	1.65%

Seats summary
PC	70.18%
New Democratic	24.56%
Liberal	5.26%

=== Results by riding ===
- Note that names in **bold** type represent Cabinet members, while italics represent party leaders.

==== Northern Manitoba ====
Electoral district	Candidates					Incumbent
Electoral district	NDP	PC	Liberal	Green	Other	Incumbent
Flin Flon	Tom Lindsey; 1,106	Angela Enright; 954	Leslie Beck; 948		Clarence Pettersen (Ind.); 359	Clarence Pettersen
Kewatinook	Eric Robinson; 1,207	Edna Nabess; 375	Judy Klassen; 1,565			Eric Robinson
Swan River	Ron Kostyshyn; 2,408	Rick Wowchuk; 4,081	Shayne Lynxleg; 483	Dan Soprovich; 296		Ron Kostyshyn
The Pas	Amanda Lathlin; 1,976	Doug Lauvstad; 1,765	Tyler Duncan; 586	Patrick Wood; 217		Amanda Lathlin
Thompson	Steve Ashton; 1,527	Kelly Bindle; 1,712	Inez Vystrcil-Spence; 638			Steve Ashton

==== Westman/Parkland ====
Electoral district	Candidates					Incumbent
Electoral district	NDP	PC	Liberal	Green	Other	Incumbent
Agassiz	Courtney Lucas; 450	Eileen Clarke; 5,228		Robert Smith; 409	Damian Dempsey (Ind.); 910	Stu Briese
Arthur-Virden	Lorne Topolniski; 600	Doyle Piwniuk; 6,006			Frank Godon (Manitoba); 846	Doyle Piwniuk
Brandon East	Drew Caldwell; 2,534	Len Isleifson; 3,669	Vanessa Hamilton; 830			Drew Caldwell
Brandon West	Linda Ross; 1,884	Reg Helwer; 5,624	William Moore; 631			Reg Helwer
Dauphin	Darcy Scheller; 1,899	Brad Michaleski; 4,795	Garry Gurke; 505	Kate Storey; 595	Darrell Inkster (Manitoba); 168	Stan Struthers
Riding Mountain	Béla Gyarmati; 601	Greg Nesbitt; 5,311	Jordan Fleury; 1,028	Mark Olenick; 779		Leanne Rowat
Spruce Woods	Amanda Chmelyk; 665	Cliff Cullen; 5,210	Jaron Hart; 512		Malcolm McKellar (Manitoba); 738	Cliff Cullen

==== Central Manitoba ====
Electoral district	Candidates					Incumbent
Electoral district	NDP	PC	Liberal	Green	Other	Incumbent
Emerson	Alanna Jones; 432	Cliff Graydon; 4,943	Loren Braul; 1,423			Cliff Graydon
Gimli	Armand Bélanger; 2,579	Jeff Wharton; 5,614		Dwight Harfield; 843	Ed Paquette (Manitoba); 239	vacant
Interlake	Tom Nevakshonoff; 1,428	Derek Johnson; 3,685	Jamal Abas; 2,068			Tom Nevakshonoff
Lakeside	Matt Austman; 1,369	Ralph Eichler; 6,077				Ralph Eichler
Midland	Jacqueline Theroux; 714	Blaine Pedersen; 6,168	Julia Sisler; 523	Stacey O’Neill; 797		Blaine Pedersen
Morden-Winkler	Elizabeth Lynch; 215	Cameron Friesen; 6,598	Benjamin Bawdon; 279	Mike Urichuk; 667		Cameron Friesen
Morris	Mohamed Alli; 840	Shannon Martin; 6,980	John Falk; 1,430			Shannon Martin
Portage la Prairie	Alex MacDonald; 697	Ian Wishart; 4,635	Stephen Prince; 1,238			Ian Wishart

==== Eastman ====
Electoral district	Candidates					Incumbent
Electoral district	NDP	PC	Liberal	Green	Other	Incumbent
Dawson Trail	Roxane Dupuis; 1,678	Bob Lagassé; 4,430	Terry Hayward; 1,652		David Sutherland (Manitoba); 516	Ron Lemieux
Lac du Bonnet	Wendy Sol; 1,647	Wayne Ewasko; 5,666				Wayne Ewasko
La Verendrye	Echo Asher; 705	Dennis Smook; 5,262	Bill Paulishyn; 696	Janine Gibson; 724		Dennis Smook
Steinbach	Kathleen McCallum; 387	Kelvin Goertzen; 6,982	Dakota Young-Brown; 461			Kelvin Goertzen
St. Paul	Andrew Podolecki; 1,757	Ron Schuler; 7,091	Pete Sanderson; 1,055			Ron Schuler
Selkirk	Greg Dewar; 2,366	Alan Lagimodiere; 4,686	Stefan Jones; 1,390			Greg Dewar

==== Northwest Winnipeg ====
Electoral district	Candidates					Incumbent
Electoral district	NDP	PC	Liberal	Green	Other	Incumbent
Burrows	Melanie Wight; 1,775	Rae Wagner; 1,014	Cindy Lamoureux; 2,641	Garrett Bodnaryk; 216	Tony Petrowski (Communist); 28	Melanie Wight
Kildonan	Dave Chomiak; 3,065	Nic Curry; 3,694	Navdeep Khangura; 974	Steven Stairs; 456	Gary Marshall (Manitoba); 133	Dave Chomiak
Point Douglas	Kevin Chief; 2,839	Marsha Street; 811	Althea Guiboche; 956	Alberteen Spence; 247	Frank Komarniski (Communist); 58	Kevin Chief
St. Johns	Nahanni Fontaine; 2,358	Barbara Judt; 1,869	Noel Bernier; 1,465	Elizabeth Puchailo; 671		Gord Mackintosh
The Maples	Mohinder Saran; 2,832	Kaur Sidhu; 2,705	Harbans Singh Brar; 1,695	John Redekopp; 582		Mohinder Saran
Tyndall Park	Ted Marcelino; 2,139	Naseer Warraich; 1,306	Aida Champagne; 1,656	Shane Neustaeter; 391		Ted Marcelino

==== Northeast Winnipeg ====
Electoral district	Candidates					Incumbent
Electoral district	NDP	PC	Liberal	Green	Other	Incumbent
Concordia	Matt Wiebe; 2,761	Andrew Frank; 2,483	Donovan Martin; 642		Terry Scott (Manitoba); 254	Matt Wiebe
Elmwood	Jim Maloway; 2,993	Sarah Langevin; 2,886			Albert Ratt (Manitoba); 579	Jim Maloway
Radisson	Preet Singh; 2,945	James Teitsma; 4,635	Scott Newman; 1,593			Bidhu Jha
River East	Jody Gillis; 2,435	Cathy Cox; 6,154	Piero Scaramuzzi; 776			Bonnie Mitchelson
Rossmere	Erna Braun; 3,389	Andrew Micklefield; 5,303	Malli Aulakh; 838		William Sullivan (Manitoba); 427	Erna Braun
St. Boniface	Greg Selinger; 3,624	Mamadou Ka; 2,211	Alain Landry; 1,663	Signe Knutson; 1,048		**Greg Selinger**
Transcona	Barb Burkowski; 2,281	Blair Yakimoski; 3,948	Chad Panting; 1,465		Darrell Rankin (Communist); 68; Ajit Kumar (Manitoba); 233	Daryl Reid

==== West Winnipeg ====
Electoral district	Candidates					Incumbent
Electoral district	NDP	PC	Liberal	Green	Other	Incumbent
Assiniboia	Joseph McKellep; 2,196	Steven Fletcher; 3,450	Ian McCausland; 1,631	Ileana Ohlsson; 580		Jim Rondeau
Charleswood	Janna Barkman; 1,168	Myrna Driedger; 5,298	Paul Brault; 1,187	Kevin Nichols; 1,080		Myrna Driedger
Kirkfield Park	Sharon Blady; 3,075	Scott Fielding; 5,457	Kelly Nord; 889	Lisa Omand; 784		Sharon Blady
St. James	Deanne Crothers; 2,723	Scott Johnston; 3,532	Michelle Finley; 1,150	Jeff Buhse; 850	Brad Gross (Manitoba); 137	Deanne Crothers
Tuxedo	Zach Fleisher; 1,312	Heather Stefanson; 4,986	Michael Lazar; 1,251	Bob Krul; 976		Heather Stefanson

==== Central Winnipeg ====
Electoral district	Candidates					Incumbent
Electoral district	NDP	PC	Liberal	Green	Other	Incumbent
Fort Garry-Riverview	James Allum; 3,450	Jeannette Montufar; 3,149	Johanna Wood; 807	James Beddome; 1,711		James Allum
Fort Rouge	Wab Kinew; 3,360	Audrey Gordon; 2,751	Rana Bokhari; 1,792	Grant Sharp; 983	Matthew Ostrove (Manitoba); 175; Paula Ducharme (Communist); 47	Jennifer Howard
Logan	Flor Marcelino; 2,020	Allie Szarkiewicz; 997	Peter Koroma; 1,457	Jitendradas Loves-Life; 397	Joe Chan (Manitoba); 185; Cheryl-Anne Carr (Communist); 63	Flor Marcelino
Minto	Andrew Swan; 2,954	Belinda Squance; 1,016	Demetre Balaktsis; 723	Martha Jo Willard; 410	Andrew Taylor (Communist); 41; Virgil Gil (Manitoba); 51; Don Woodstock (Ind.); 589	Andrew Swan
River Heights	Shafagh Daneshfar; 591	Tracey Maconachie; 3,485	Jon Gerrard; 5,230	Michael Cardillo; 771		Jon Gerrard
Wolseley	Rob Altemeyer; 3,037	Raquel Dancho; 945	Shandi Strong; 653	David Nickarz; 2,645	Wayne Sturby (Manitoba); 79	Rob Altemeyer

==== South Winnipeg ====
Electoral district	Candidates					Incumbent
Electoral district	NDP	PC	Liberal	Green	Other	Incumbent
Fort Richmond	Kerri Irvin-Ross; 2,274	Sarah Guillemard; 2,879	Kyra Wilson; 814	Cameron Proulx; 540		Kerri Irvin-Ross
Fort Whyte	George Wong; 1,718	Brian Pallister; 6,775	Peter Bastians; 1,205	Carli Runions; 731	Daryl Newis (Manitoba); 127	Brian Pallister
Riel	Christine Melnick; 3,053	Rochelle Squires; 5,024	Neil Johnston; 1,627			Christine Melnick
Seine River	Lise Pinkos; 2,343	Janice Morley-Lecomte; 5,396	Peter Chura; 2,388			Theresa Oswald
Southdale	Dashi Zargani; 2,460	Andrew Smith; 6,663	Ryan Colyer; 1,318			vacant
St. Norbert	Dave Gaudreau; 3,062	Jon Reyes; 4,673	James Bloomfield; 1,251		Narinder Kaur Johar (Ind.); 174	Dave Gaudreau
St. Vital	Jamie Moses; 2,831	Colleen Mayer; 3,229	Bryan Van Wilgenburg; 1,296	Kelly Whelan-Enns; 791		Nancy Allan

=== Synopsis of results ===
2016 Manitoba general election – synopsis of riding results
Electoral division	Winning party							Votes							
Electoral division	2011	1st place	Votes	Share	Margin #	Margin %	2nd place	PC	NDP	Lib	Grn	MB	Ind	Comm	Total
Agassiz	PC	PC	5,228	74.72%	4,318	61.71%	Ind	5,228	450	–	409	–	910	–	6,997
Arthur-Virden	PC	PC	6,006	80.60%	5,160	69.24%	MB	6,006	600	–	–	846	–	–	7,452
Assiniboia	NDP	PC	3,450	43.91%	1,254	15.96%	NDP	3,450	2,196	1,631	580	–	–	–	7,857
Brandon East	NDP	PC	3,669	52.17%	1,135	16.14%	NDP	3,669	2,534	830	–	–	–	–	7,033
Brandon West	PC	PC	5,624	69.10%	3,740	45.95%	NDP	5,624	1,884	631	–	–	–	–	8,139
Burrows	NDP	Lib	2,641	46.55%	866	15.26%	NDP	1,014	1,775	2,641	216	–	–	28	5,674
Charleswood	PC	PC	5,298	60.67%	4,111	47.07%	Lib	5,298	1,168	1,187	1,080	–	–	–	8,733
Concordia	NDP	NDP	2,761	44.97%	278	4.53%	PC	2,483	2,761	642	–	254	–	–	6,140
Dauphin	NDP	PC	4,795	60.22%	2,896	36.37%	NDP	4,795	1,899	505	595	168	–	–	7,962
Dawson Trail	NDP	PC	4,430	53.53%	2,752	33.25%	NDP	4,430	1,678	1,652	–	516	–	–	8,276
Elmwood	NDP	NDP	2,993	46.35%	107	1.66%	PC	2,886	2,993	–	–	579	–	–	6,458
Emerson	PC	PC	4,943	72.71%	3,520	51.78%	Lib	4,943	432	1,423	–	–	–	–	6,798
Flin Flon	NDP	NDP	1,106	32.85%	152	4.51%	PC	954	1,106	948	–	–	359	–	3,367
Fort Garry-Riverview	NDP	NDP	3,450	37.84%	301	3.30%	PC	3,149	3,450	807	1,711	–	–	–	9,117
Fort Richmond	NDP	PC	2,879	44.24%	605	9.30%	NDP	2,879	2,274	814	540	–	–	–	6,507
Fort Rouge	NDP	NDP	3,360	37.63%	789	8.84%	PC	2,571	3,360	1,792	983	175	–	47	8,928
Fort Whyte	PC	PC	6,775	64.18%	5,057	47.91%	NDP	6,775	1,718	1,205	731	127	–	–	10,556
Gimli	NDP	PC	5,614	60.53%	3,035	32.72%	NDP	5,614	2,579	–	843	239	–	–	9,275
Interlake	NDP	PC	3,685	51.32%	1,617	22.52%	Lib	3,685	1,428	2,068	–	–	–	–	7,181
Kewatinook	NDP	Lib	1,565	49.73%	358	11.38%	NDP	375	1,207	1,565	–	–	–	–	3,147
Kildonan	NDP	PC	3,694	44.39%	629	7.56%	NDP	3,694	3,065	974	456	133	–	–	8,322
Kirkfield Park	NDP	PC	5,457	53.47%	2,382	23.34%	NDP	5,457	3,075	889	784	–	–	–	10,205
La Vérendrye	PC	PC	5,262	71.23%	4,538	61.43%	Green	5,262	705	696	724	–	–	–	7,387
Lac du Bonnet	PC	PC	5,666	77.48%	4,019	54.96%	NDP	5,666	1,647	–	–	–	–	–	7,313
Lakeside	PC	PC	6,077	81.61%	4,708	63.23%	NDP	6,077	1,369	–	–	–	–	–	7,446
Logan	NDP	NDP	2,020	39.46%	563	11.00%	Lib	997	2,020	1,457	397	185	–	63	5,119
Midland	PC	PC	6,168	75.20%	5,371	65.48%	Green	6,168	714	523	797	–	–	–	8,202
Minto	NDP	NDP	2,954	51.07%	1,938	33.51%	PC	1,016	2,954	723	410	51	589	41	5,784
Morden-Winkler	PC	PC	6,598	85.04%	5,931	76.44%	Green	6,598	215	279	667	–	–	–	7,759
Morris	PC	PC	6,980	75.46%	5,550	60.00%	Lib	6,980	840	1,430	–	–	–	–	9,250
Point Douglas	NDP	NDP	2,839	57.81%	1,883	38.34%	Lib	811	2,839	956	247	–	–	58	4,911
Portage la Prairie	PC	PC	4,635	70.55%	3,397	51.70%	Lib	4,635	697	1,238	–	–	–	–	6,570
Radisson	NDP	PC	4,635	50.53%	1,690	18.42%	NDP	4,635	2,945	1,593	–	–	–	–	9,173
Riding Mountain	PC	PC	5,311	68.80%	4,283	55.49%	Lib	5,311	601	1,028	779	–	–	–	7,719
Riel	NDP	PC	5,024	51.77%	1,971	20.31%	NDP	5,024	3,053	1,627	–	–	–	–	9,704
River East	PC	PC	6,154	65.71%	3,719	39.71%	NDP	6,154	2,435	776	–	–	–	–	9,365
River Heights	Lib	Lib	5,230	51.90%	1,745	17.32%	PC	3,485	591	5,230	771	–	–	–	10,077
Rossmere	NDP	PC	5,303	53.26%	1,914	19.22%	NDP	5,303	3,389	838	–	427	–	–	9,957
Seine River	NDP	PC	5,396	53.28%	3,008	29.70%	Lib	5,396	2,343	2,388	–	–	–	–	10,127
Selkirk	NDP	PC	4,686	55.51%	2,320	27.48%	NDP	4,686	2,366	1,390	–	–	–	–	8,442
Southdale	NDP	PC	6,663	63.82%	4,203	40.25%	NDP	6,663	2,460	1,318	–	–	–	–	10,441
Spruce Woods	PC	PC	5,210	73.12%	4,472	62.76%	MB	5,210	665	512	–	738	–	–	7,125
St. Boniface	NDP	NDP	3,624	42.41%	1,413	16.53%	PC	2,211	3,624	1,663	1,048	–	–	–	8,546
St. James	NDP	PC	3,532	42.09%	809	9.64%	NDP	3,532	2,723	1,150	850	137	–	–	8,392
St. Johns	NDP	NDP	2,358	37.06%	489	7.69%	PC	1,869	2,358	1,465	671	–	–	–	6,363
St. Norbert	NDP	PC	4,673	51.02%	1,611	17.59%	NDP	4,673	3,062	1,251	–	–	174	–	9,160
St. Paul	PC	PC	7,091	71.60%	5,334	53.86%	NDP	7,091	1,757	1,055	–	–	–	–	9,903
St. Vital	NDP	PC	3,229	39.63%	398	4.89%	NDP	3,229	2,831	1,296	791	–	–	–	8,147
Steinbach	PC	PC	6,982	89.17%	6,521	83.28%	Lib	6,982	387	461	–	–	–	–	7,830
Swan River	NDP	PC	4,105	56.19%	1,683	23.04%	NDP	4,105	2,422	482	297	–	–	–	7,306
The Maples	NDP	NDP	2,832	36.24%	127	1.63%	PC	2,705	2,832	1,695	582	–	–	–	7,814
The Pas	NDP	NDP	1,976	43.49%	211	4.64%	PC	1,765	1,976	586	217	–	–	–	4,544
Thompson	NDP	PC	1,712	44.16%	185	4.77%	NDP	1,712	1,527	638	–	–	–	–	3,877
Transcona	NDP	PC	3,948	49.38%	1,667	20.85%	NDP	3,948	2,281	1,465	–	233	–	68	7,995
Tuxedo	PC	PC	4,986	58.49%	3,674	43.10%	NDP	4,986	1,312	1,251	976	–	–	–	8,525
Tyndall Park	NDP	NDP	2,139	38.95%	483	8.79%	Lib	1,306	2,139	1,656	391	–	–	–	5,492
Wolseley	NDP	NDP	3,037	41.27%	392	5.33%	Green	945	3,037	653	2,645	79	–	–	7,359

= open seat
= winning candidate was in previous Legislature
= incumbent had switched allegiance
= previously incumbent in another riding
= incumbency arose from a byelection gain
= not incumbent; was previously elected to the Legislature
= other incumbents renominated
= previously an MP in the House of Commons of Canada
= multiple candidates

=== Turnout, winning shares and swings ===
Summary of riding results by turnout, vote share for winning candidate, and swing (vs 2011)
Riding and winning party			Turnout		Vote share (Note: Share won by winning candidate, with difference noted from share achieved by the same party in 2011.)		Swing (Note: Positive indicates improvement to standing of party winning in 2011; negative points to 2011's second-place party being swung to.)	
Riding and winning party			%	Change (pp)	%	Change (pp)	To	Change (pp)
Agassiz	PC	Hold	57.14	11.13	74.72	3.67	PC	7.22
Arthur-Virden	PC	Hold	53.29	1.39	80.60	14.62	PC	18.39
Assiniboia	PC	Gain	59.57	-2.43	43.91	6.68	PC	-18.48
Brandon East	PC	Gain	54.50	1.38	52.17	13.62	PC	-16.27
Brandon West	PC	Hold	55.93	-3.86	69.10	20.42	PC	22.11
Burrows	Lib	Gain	52.60	5.52	46.55	34.36	PC	-10.24
Charleswood	PC	Hold	65.65	4.56	60.67	4.84	PC	10.74
Concordia	NDP	Hold	54.09	4.30	44.97	-18.09	PC	-15.08
Dauphin	PC	Gain	61.85	-0.24	60.22	19.11	PC	-25.09
Dawson Trail	PC	Gain	57.78	-0.40	53.53	10.01	PC	-21.14
Elmwood	NDP	Hold	54.98	2.43	46.35	-8.26	PC	-9.52
Emerson	PC	Hold	53.49	9.06	72.71	0.06	PC	6.74
Flin Flon	NDP	Hold	34.44	-0.90	32.85	-24.29	PC	-14.26
Fort Garry-Riverview	NDP	Hold	68.53	3.48	37.84	-17.71	PC	-9.65
Fort Richmond	PC	Gain	67.10	4.19	44.24	5.62	PC	-12.07
Fort Rouge	NDP	Hold	65.15	3.92	37.63	-13.63	Lib	-5.28
Fort Whyte	PC	Hold	60.71	-1.20	64.18	1.74	PC	7.55
Gimli	PC	Gain	65.96	-0.03	60.53	17.25	PC	-20.48
Interlake	PC	Gain	61.00	7.64	51.32	7.90	PC	-19.24
Kewatinook	Lib	Gain	24.31	-11.37	49.73	48.36	NDP	4.07
Kildonan	PC	Gain	60.96	5.99	44.39	8.74	PC	-15.71
Kirkfield Park	PC	Gain	68.71	-0.25	53.47	6.92	PC	-11.77
La Verendrye	PC	Hold	55.32	1.71	71.23	7.16	PC	11.87
Lac du Bonnet	PC	Hold	54.92	-3.12	77.48	23.18	PC	19.60
Lakeside	PC	Hold	57.78	0.66	81.61	15.81	PC	11.66
Logan	NDP	Hold	51.98	3.95	39.46	-19.29	Lib	-15.33
Midland	PC	Hold	59.65	8.30	75.20	5.76	PC	10.35
Minto	NDP	Hold	51.38	4.95	51.07	-15.33	PC	-8.80
Morden-Winkler	PC	Hold	51.93	11.15	85.04	-0.49	PC	4.10
Morris	PC	Hold	56.94	6.26	75.46	1.46	PC	5.87
Point Douglas	NDP	Hold	42.53	-1.51	57.81	-15.47	PC	-7.16
Portage la Prairie	PC	Hold	51.33	0.34	70.55	18.31	PC	23.51
Radisson	PC	Gain	62.84	1.36	50.53	11.22	PC	-17.13
Riding Mountain	PC	Hold	55.50	1.49	68.80	10.34	PC	18.51
Riel	PC	Gain	67.38	3.24	51.77	11.60	PC	-17.52
River East	PC	Hold	65.94	-1.06	65.71	14.38	PC	16.26
River Heights	Lib	Hold	72.70	0.19	51.90	5.98	Lib	2.06
Rossmere	PC	Gain	60.51	0.44	53.26	17.26	PC	-19.91
Seine River	PC	Gain	66.80	-4.01	53.28	9.20	PC	-19.57
Selkirk	PC	Gain	58.72	3.95	55.51	16.13	PC	-22.06
Southdale	PC	Gain	62.31	-7.82	63.82	18.83	PC	-23.64
Spruce Woods	PC	Hold	51.99	3.35	73.12	6.47	PC	12.88
St. Boniface	NDP	Hold	63.67	4.17	42.41	-26.47	PC	-17.22
St. James	PC	Gain	61.94	-0.08	42.09	3.76	PC	-10.53
St. Johns	NDP	Hold	51.43	3.08	37.06	-28.91	PC	-17.99
St. Norbert	PC	Gain	65.09	0.85	51.02	6.22	PC	-8.97
St. Paul	PC	Hold	61.12	2.83	71.60	12.02	PC	15.86
St. Vital	PC	Gain	63.97	3.62	39.63	5.23	PC	-15.28
Steinbach	PC	Hold	51.71	2.05	89.17	3.68	PC	3.18
Swan River	PC	Gain	60.18	0.52	56.19	15.8	PC	-19.40
The Maples	NDP	Hold	55.63	0.72	36.24	-15.59	PC	-12.17
The Pas	NDP	Hold	30.70	0.30	43.49	-30.12	PC	-22.70
Thompson	PC	Gain	37.36	0.64	44.16	15.86	PC	-22.50
Transcona	PC	Gain	55.98	4.74	49.38	14.76	PC	-22.23
Tuxedo	PC	Hold	62.39	0.08	58.49	5.75	PC	7.88
Tyndall Park	NDP	Hold	53.40	1.89	38.95	-6.22	Lib	-0.73
Wolseley	NDP	Hold	63.26	7.66	41.27	-19.46	Green	-17.88

=== Changes in party shares ===
Share change analysis by party and riding (2016 vs 2011)
Riding	Green		Liberal		NDP		PC	
Riding	%	Change (pp)	%	Change (pp)	%	Change (pp)	%	Change (pp)
Agassiz	5.85	0.74	–	-6.64	6.43	-10.77	74.72	3.67
Arthur-Virden			–	-3.81	8.05	-22.16	80.60	14.62
Assiniboia	7.38	5.05	20.76	18.54	27.95	-30.27	43.91	6.68
Brandon East	–	-2.52	11.80	7.82	36.03	-18.92	52.17	13.62
Brandon West			7.75	3.37	23.15	-23.79	69.10	20.42
Burrows	3.81	1.40	46.55	34.36	31.28	-28.05	17.87	-7.58
Charleswood	12.37	6.92	13.59	4.88	13.37	-16.64	60.67	4.84
Concordia	–	-4.85	10.46	6.73	44.97	-18.09	40.44	12.07
Dauphin	7.47	5.03	6.34	4.82	23.85	-31.07	60.22	19.11
Dawson Trail			19.96	16.03	20.28	-32.27	53.53	10.01
Elmwood	–	-4.89	–	-6.60	46.35	-8.26	44.69	10.79
Emerson			20.93	13.36	6.35	-13.42	72.71	0.06
Flin Flon	–	-3.36	28.16	12.74	32.85	-24.29	28.33	4.24
Fort Garry-Riverview	18.77	14.46	8.85	1.66	37.84	-17.71	34.54	1.59
Fort Richmond	8.30	5.30	12.51	7.61	34.95	-18.53	44.24	5.62
Fort Rouge	11.01	5.57	20.07	-3.06	37.63	-13.63	28.80	8.64
Fort Whyte	6.92	6.92	11.42	3.49	16.28	-13.36	64.18	1.74
Gimli	9.09	5.91	–	-2.03	27.81	-23.72	60.53	17.25
Interlake			28.80	25.90	19.89	-30.58	51.32	7.90
Kewatinook	–	-2.63	49.73	48.36	38.35	-18.79	11.92	-26.94
Kildonan	5.48	5.48	11.70	6.86	36.83	-22.68	44.39	8.74
Kirkfield Park	7.68	4.47	8.71	5.23	30.13	-16.62	53.47	6.92
La Verendrye	9.80	5.02	9.42	4.41	9.54	-16.59	71.23	7.16
Lac du Bonnet	–	-3.62	–	-3.55	22.52	-16.01	77.48	23.18
Lakeside	–	-4.95	–	-3.35	18.39	-7.51	81.61	15.81
Logan	7.76	1.16	28.46	11.38	39.46	-19.29	19.48	2.94
Midland	9.72	9.72	6.38	-0.53	8.71	-14.94	75.20	5.76
Minto	7.09	1.01	12.50	1.31	51.07	-15.33	17.57	2.26
Morden-Winkler	8.60	8.60	3.60	0.59	2.77	-8.69	85.04	-0.49
Morris			15.46	8.83	9.08	-10.29	75.46	1.46
Point Douglas	5.03	1.64	19.47	14.52	57.81	-15.47	16.51	-1.14
Portage la Prairie			18.84	10.40	10.61	-28.71	70.55	18.31
Radisson			17.37	11.82	32.11	-23.04	50.53	11.22
Riding Mountain	10.09	6.60	13.32	9.76	7.79	-26.69	68.80	10.34
Riel			16.77	11.84	31.46	-23.44	51.77	11.60
River East	–	-2.68	8.29	6.45	26.00	-18.14	65.71	14.38
River Heights	7.65	4.08	51.90	5.98	5.86	-11.93	34.58	1.87
Rossmere	–	-3.68	8.42	4.68	34.04	-22.55	53.26	17.26
Seine River			23.58	20.73	23.14	-29.93	53.28	9.20
Selkirk			16.47	11.87	28.03	-28.00	55.51	16.13
Southdale			12.62	9.62	23.56	-28.45	63.82	18.83
Spruce Woods			7.19	2.46	9.33	-19.28	73.12	6.47
St. Boniface	12.26	6.09	19.46	12.40	42.41	-26.47	25.87	7.97
St. James	10.13	5.90	13.70	6.01	32.45	-17.31	42.09	3.76
St. Johns	10.55	4.33	23.02	17.50	37.06	-28.91	29.37	7.08
St. Norbert			13.66	3.60	33.43	-11.72	51.02	6.22
St. Paul			10.65	7.69	17.74	-19.71	71.60	12.02
St. Vital	9.71	9.71	15.91	10.39	34.75	-25.33	39.63	5.23
Steinbach			5.89	-0.99	4.94	-2.69	89.17	3.68
Swan River	4.07	4.07	6.60	3.13	33.15	-23.00	56.19	15.80
The Maples	7.45	3.71	21.69	3.12	36.24	-15.59	34.62	8.76
The Pas	4.78	4.78	12.90	10.07	43.49	-30.12	38.84	15.27
Thompson			16.46	13.28	39.39	-29.14	44.16	15.86
Transcona			18.32	11.17	28.53	-29.70	49.38	14.76
Tuxedo	11.45	6.10	14.67	-1.85	15.39	-10.00	58.49	5.75
Tyndall Park	7.12	3.00	30.15	-4.76	38.95	-6.22	23.78	7.98
Wolseley	35.94	16.30	8.87	1.45	41.27	-19.46	12.84	0.64

= did not field a candidate in 2011

=== Summary results ===
Elections to the 41st Manitoba Legislature – seats won/lost by party, 2011–2016
Party	2011	Gain from (loss to)			2016
Party	2011	**NDP**	**PC**	**Lib**	2016
New Democratic	37		(21)	(2)	14
Progressive Conservative	19	21			40
Liberal	1	2			3
**Total**	57	23	(21)	(2)	57

Elections to the 41st Manitoba Legislature – top 5 candidates from each riding, by party
Party	Candidates	1st	2nd	3rd	4th	5th
Progressive Conservative	57	40	11	6	–	–
New Democratic	57	14	28	12	3	–
Liberal	51	3	11	31	6	–
Green	30	–	4	5	20	1
Manitoba	16	–	2	1	5	7
Independent	4	–	1	–	3	–

Party candidates in 2nd place
Party in 1st place	Party in 2nd place						Total
Party in 1st place	**PC**	**NDP**	**Lib**	**Grn**	**MB**	**Ind**	Total
Progressive Conservative	–	26	8	3	2	1	40
New Democratic	10	–	3	1	–		14
Liberal	1	2	–	–	–	–	3
Total	11	28	11	4	2	1	57

Principal races, according to 1st and 2nd-place results
Parties		Seats
█ Progressive Conservative	█ New Democratic	36
█ Progressive Conservative	█ Liberal	9
█ Progressive Conservative	█ Green	3
█ Progressive Conservative	█ Manitoba	2
█ Progressive Conservative	█ Independent	1
█ New Democratic	█ Liberal	5
█ New Democratic	█ Green	1
Total		57
