= Jamie Moses (politician) =

Canadian politician

The Honourable Jamie Moses MLA
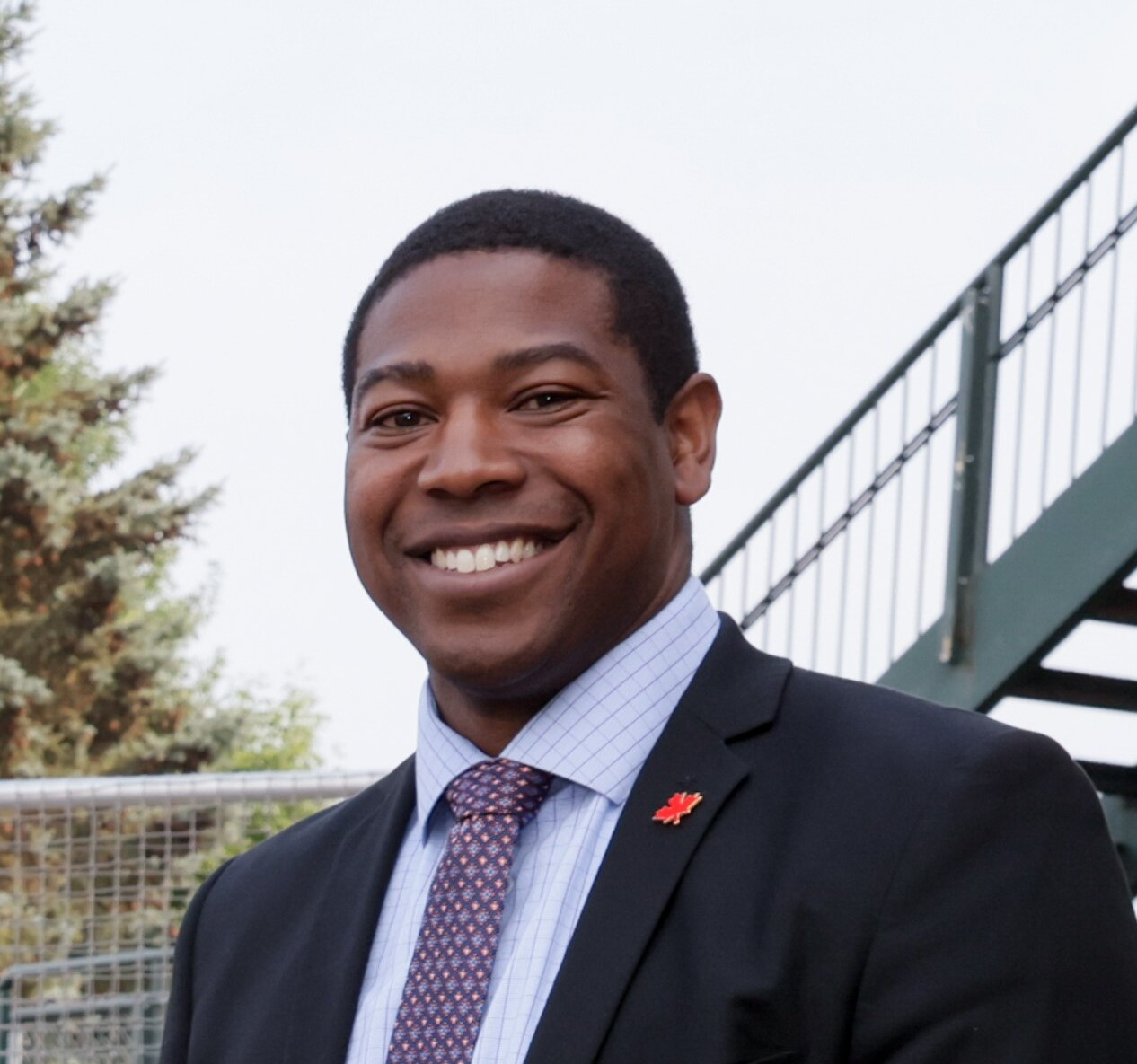
- Moses in 2025

Minister of Business, Mining, Trade and Job Creation
- Incumbent
- Assumed office November 13, 2024
- Premier: Wab Kinew
- Preceded by: Jamie Moses

Minister of Economic Development, Investment, Trade and Natural Resources
- In office October 18, 2023 – November 13, 2024
- Premier: Wab Kinew
- Preceded by: Jeff Wharton
- Succeeded by: Jamie Moses (Minister of Business, Mining, Trade and Job Creation); Ian Bushie (Minister of Natural Resources and Indigenous Futures)

Member of the Legislative Assembly of Manitoba for St. Vital
- Incumbent
- Assumed office September 10, 2019
- Preceded by: Colleen Mayer

Personal details
- Party: New Democratic
- Education: University of Manitoba (BSc)

Jamie Moses is a Canadian politician who is the current Minister of Economic Development, Investment and Trade and Minister of Natural Resources for Manitoba since October 18, 2023. Since 2019, he has represented the St. Vital electoral district in the Legislative Assembly of Manitoba. Moses is a member of the Manitoba New Democratic Party (Manitoba NDP).

== Biography ==
Moses was born in Winnipeg and is a graduate of River East Collegiate. He holds a Bachelor in Agribusiness from the University of Manitoba. Moses is an athlete and is a former Manitoba AAAA provincial male athlete of the year. He currently holds the Winnipeg High School Football League record for the most receiving yards in a game. He also played football for the University of Manitoba Bisons. Prior to his political career he worked at the Investors Group, technology company Rapid RTC and the Canadian Wheat Board.

=== Legislative Assembly of Manitoba ===
In the 2019 Manitoba general election, Moses was elected to represent the St. Vital electoral district. Moses, alongside Uzoma Asagwara and Audrey Gordon, is one of the first three Black Canadian MLAs elected in Manitoba. By 2021, he was the Official Opposition Critic for Economic Development and Training.

Moses was elected in 2019 after he defeated Progressive Conservative MLA and cabinet minister Colleen Mayer. Previously, he ran for the NDP and came second to Mayer in St. Vital in the 2016 election after former minister Nancy Allan chose not to seek re-election.

In October 2021, Moses introduced private members Bill 232, to recognize August 1 of every year as Emancipation Day in Manitoba, commemorating the day the Slavery Abolition Act took effect in the British Empire in 1834. The legislature passed the bill unanimously as the Emancipation Day Act.

== Electoral results ==
2023 Manitoba general election: St. Vital
Party	Candidate	Votes	%	±%	Expenditures
New Democratic	Jamie Moses	5,288	61.15	+16.71	$17,589.33
Progressive Conservative	Saima Aziz	2,537	29.34	-5.63	$19,348.38
Liberal	Peter Bastians	823	9.52	-4.32	not filed
Total valid votes/expense limit		8,648	99.45	–	$59,566.00
Total rejected and declined ballots		48	0.55	–	
Turnout		8,696	56.88	-3.89	
Eligible voters		15,287			
New Democratic hold		Swing		+11.17	
Source(s) Source: Elections Manitoba

2019 Manitoba general election: St. Vital
Party	Candidate	Votes	%	±%	Expenditures
New Democratic	Jamie Moses	4,081	44.44	+10.1	$19,491.65
Progressive Conservative	Colleen Mayer	3,211	34.96	-7.8	$49,161.66
Liberal	Jeffrey Anderson	1,271	13.84	-2.8	$16,801.57
Green	Elizabeth Dickson	499	5.43	-0.9	$0.00
Independent	Baljeet Sharma	62	0.68	–	$790.06
Manitoba First	David Sutherland	60	0.65	–	$1,210.90
Total valid votes		9,184	100.0		
Total rejected ballots					
Turnout			63.7		
Eligible voters					
New Democratic gain from Progressive Conservative		Swing		+9.0	
Source(s) Source: Manitoba. Chief Electoral Officer (2019). Statement of Votes for the 42nd Provincial General Election, September 10, 2019 (PDF) (Report). Winnipeg: Elections Manitoba.

2016 Manitoba general election: St. Vital
Party	Candidate	Votes	%	±%	Expenditures
Progressive Conservative	Colleen Mayer	3,229	39.63	+5.23	$24,705.52
New Democratic	Jamie Moses	2,831	34.74	-25.34	$26,333.60
Liberal	Bryan Van Wilgenburg	1,296	15.90	+10.39	$6,849.49
Green	Kelly Whelan-Enns	791	9.70	+9.70	$50.00
Total valid votes/expense limit		8,147	98.69	-	$43,267.00
Rejected and declined votes		108	1.31		
Turnout		8,255	63.97		
Registered voters		12,905			
Source: Elections Manitoba
