= Christine Melnick =

Canadian politician

Manitoba Minister of Immigration and Multiculturalism
- In office January 13, 2012 – October 18, 2013
- Premier: Greg Selinger
- Preceded by: Jennifer Howard
- Succeeded by: Erna Braun

Manitoba Minister of Water Stewardship
- In office September 21, 2006 – January 13, 2012
- Premier: Gary Doer; Greg Selinger
- Preceded by: Steve Ashton
- Succeeded by: Ministry Abolished

Manitoba Minister of Family Services and Housing
- In office November 4, 2003 – September 21, 2006
- Premier: Gary Doer
- Preceded by: Drew Caldwell
- Succeeded by: Gord Mackintosh

Member of the Legislative Assembly of Manitoba for Riel
- In office June 3, 2003 – April 19, 2016
- Preceded by: Linda Asper
- Succeeded by: Rochelle Squires

Personal details
- Party: New Democratic Party
- Education: University of Manitoba; Dalhousie University
- Occupation: Librarian, researcher
- Website: christinemelnick.ca

Christine "Chris" Melnick (born 1961) is a former politician in Manitoba, Canada. She was a cabinet minister in the governments led by New Democratic Party (NDP) Premiers Gary Doer and Greg Selinger.

Born in Winnipeg, Manitoba, Melnick received a Bachelor of Arts degree from the University of Manitoba and subsequently received a master's degree in library and information science from Dalhousie University in Nova Scotia. She has worked for a variety of businesses in the private and public sectors, with experience such fields as in education, advertising and offshore oil. Prior to entering provincial politics, she was employed as a librarian and researcher at the Canada/Manitoba Business Service Centre and was a trustee for the Louis Riel School Division of southeastern Winnipeg. She was also active in women's health, human rights, literacy and environmental issues, and sat on the province's Council on Post-Secondary Education.

Melnick was elected to the Legislative Assembly of Manitoba in 2003, succeeding retiring NDP Member of the Legislative Assembly (MLA) Linda Asper in the south Winnipeg riding of Riel. She received 4,393 votes, against 3,171 for her Progressive Conservative opponent, Shirley Render, who had previously represented the neighbouring riding of St. Vital from 1990 to 1999. The NDP, then led by Doer, won a landslide victory. Following the election, she was appointed Minister of Family Services and Housing, with responsibility for Persons with Disabilities.

She was re-elected in the provincial elections of 2007 and 2011.

In September 2007, Doer appointed her as Minister of Water Stewardship, succeeding Steve Ashton. In January 2012, Melnick was appointed Minister of Immigration and Multiculturalism. In October 2013, Selinger, who had been party leader and premier since 2009, shuffled Melnick out of cabinet, along with fellow veteran ministers Nancy Allan and Jim Rondeau.

On February 4, 2014, Selinger removed Melnick from the NDP caucus after she claimed she was told to act as a scapegoat for the premier relating to a controversy surrounding invitations issued to a legislative debate. On November 13, 2014, Melnick was readmitted to NDP caucus, but the leadership refused to let her attend caucus meetings.

In 2018, Melnick was honoured with the Peter Gzowski Award for her contributions to literacy in Canada.
