= Jim Walding =

Canadian politician (1937–2007)

24th Speaker of the Legislative Assembly of Manitoba
- In office February 25, 1982 – February 11, 1986
- Preceded by: Harry Graham
- Succeeded by: Myrna Phillips

Member of the Legislative Assembly of Manitoba for St. Vital
- In office April 5, 1971 – April 26, 1988
- Preceded by: Jack Hardy
- Succeeded by: Bob Rose

Personal details
- Born: May 9, 1937 Rushden, England
- Died: April 23, 2007 (aged 69) Manitoba, Canada
- Party: New Democratic Party
- Spouse: Valerie
- Children: 3
- Profession: Optician

Military service
- Branch/service: British Army
- Unit: Royal Inniskilling Fusiliers

Derek James "Jim" Walding (May 9, 1937 – April 23, 2007) was a politician in Manitoba, Canada. He was a member of the Legislative Assembly of Manitoba from 1971 to 1988 and served as speaker of the assembly from 1982 to 1986. Walding was a member of the New Democratic Party of Manitoba (NDP). In 1988, he brought down the NDP government of Howard Pawley by voting against his party's budget. That was the first time in Canadian history that a majority government was defeated by a vote of one of its own party members.

== Early life and career ==
Walding was born at Rushden, Northamptonshire, England, and was educated at Wellingborough Grammar School. He spent three years with the Royal Inniskilling Fusiliers, including a stint in West Berlin. He moved to Canada in 1961 and worked in Winnipeg as a dispensing optician and contact lens fitter.

Walding had supported the Labour Party in Britain. In 1963, joined the similar New Democratic Party in Canada and served on the party's provincial executive in the 1960s.

== Political career ==
Walding first ran for the Manitoba legislature in the 1969 provincial election. He initially sought the NDP nomination in the northeastern Winnipeg division of Radisson, but he lost to Harry Shafransky. He was later recruited as the party's candidate for the nearby division of St. Vital, and lost to Progressive Conservative candidate Jack Hardy by only 23 votes.

Hardy resigned from the legislature in February 1971, and Walding was nominated as the NDP candidate for the by-election to succeed him. He was narrowly elected, defeating Liberal candidate Dan Kennedy by 295 votes. The result, along with another by-election win on the same day, gave Premier Edward Schreyer a stable majority government in the provincial legislature. Walding served as a backbench supporter of the Schreyer government and developed a strong reputation for constituency work. He also chaired the private bills committee of the legislature and gave up his practice as an optician.

Walding voted against Schreyer's decision to extend public funding to denominational schools in a free vote of the legislature. He faced a serious challenge from Kennedy in the 1973 election but won by 105 votes.

The New Democrats were defeated in the 1977 provincial election although Walding was personally re-elected with an increased plurality. After Schreyer's appointment as Governor General of Canada in 1979, Walding endorsed Sidney Green in his unsuccessful bid to become interim NDP leader. He later supported Pawley, the successful candidate, at the party's leadership convention.

The NDP returned to government in the 1981 provincial election. Walding was not appointed to cabinet, as some had expected. Instead, Pawley appointed him as speaker of the legislature on February 25, 1982. Over the next four years, his relationship with Pawley became increasingly strained.

In 1983 and 1984, Walding allowed the opposition Progressive Conservatives to stall passage of the Pawley government's re-entrenchment of French-language rights. Initially, the Conservatives refused to enter the chamber to vote on the legislation, and Walding refused to call a vote in their absence. As a result, the division bells were allowed to ring for several hours at the end of each legislative day. When NDP cabinet minister Andy Anstett restricted the amount of time that the bells could ring, the Conservatives boycotted the assembly entirely. Walding still refused to call a vote. On February 21, 1984, he refused a direct request from Pawley to move the legislative agenda forward. The house was eventually prorogued with the issue still unresolved.

Many questioned the validity of Walding's decision. Sidney Green, who had left the NDP by then and also opposed French-language re-entrenchment, still argued that Walding was wrong to give the Conservatives a means to disrupt the legislative process. Walding's actions made him extremely unpopular with some segments of his party. He was challenged for the St. Vital NDP nomination in 1986 by Gerri Unwin and Sig Laser, and he defeated Laser by a single vote on the second ballot.

Walding was re-elected in the general election of 1986 with a reduced majority. The NDP was re-elected with a narrow majority government, and Pawley did not reappoint Walding as speaker.

As a backbencher, Walding spoke out against the Pawley government on several issues. He was particularly opposed to affirmative action legislation, which he regarded as discriminatory.

Walding voted for an opposition amendment to his party's budget on March 8, 1988, despite having assured Finance Minister Eugene Kostyra that he would support it. Earlier in the year, longtime cabinet minister Laurent Desjardins had essentially ceased attending legislative sessions. As a result, Walding's defection toppled the Pawley government. The NDP was roundly defeated in the general election that followed, in which Walding was not a candidate.

== Death and legacy ==
He died at 69 after a short battle with cancer in 2007. He was survived by his wife, Valerie (who passed in 2020), and their children, Andrew, Phillip and Christine.

Ian Stewart has written a book about Walding's political career, Just One Vote: Jim Walding's nomination to constitutional defeat (2009). Stewart argues that Walding's 1986 nomination victory set in motion a series of events that led to the defeat of the Meech Lake Accord on constitutional reform.

== Electoral record ==
1986 Manitoba general election: St. Vital
| Party | Candidate | Votes | % | ±% |
|---|---|---|---|---|
| New Democratic | Jim Walding | 4,430 | 45.32 | −7.48 |
| Progressive Conservative | Paul Herriot | 3,872 | 39.62 | −1.02 |
| Liberal | Walter Pederson | 1,472 | 15.06 | +8.50 |
| Total valid votes | | 9,774 | – | – |
| Rejected | | 31 | – | |
| Eligible voters / turnout | | 13,285 | 73.57% | -6.77% |
| New Democratic hold | | Swing | | -3.23 |
Source: Elections Manitoba

1981 Manitoba general election: St. Vital
| Party | Candidate | Votes | % | ±% |
|---|---|---|---|---|
| New Democratic | Jim Walding | 5,504 | 52.80 | +11.18 |
| Progressive Conservative | John Robertson | 4,236 | 40.64 | +4.69 |
| Liberal | Gord Patterson | 684 | 6.56 | -15.87 |
| Total valid votes | | 10,424 | 100.00 | |
| Rejected votes | | 34 | | |
| Turnout | | 10,458 | 80.61 | |
| Electors on the lists | | 12,974 | | |
| New Democratic hold | | Swing | | +3.24 |

1977 Manitoba general election: St. Vital
| Party | Candidate | Votes | % | ±% |
|---|---|---|---|---|
| New Democratic | Jim Walding | 3,924 | 41.62 | +2.37 |
| Progressive Conservative | Gil Shaw | 3,390 | 35.95 | +13.38 |
| Liberal | Eddie Coutu | 2,115 | 22.43 | −15.75 |
| Total valid votes | | 9,429 | 100.00 | |
| Rejected votes | | 18 | | |
| Turnout | | 9,447 | 84.70 | −1.14 |
| Electors on the lists | | 11,154 | | |
| New Democratic hold | | Swing | | -5.50 |

17.80
1973 Manitoba general election: St. Vital
| Party | Candidate | Votes | % | ±% |
|---|---|---|---|---|
| New Democratic | Jim Walding | 3,870 | 39.25 | +3.56 |
| Liberal | Dan Kennedy | 3,765 | 38.18 | +9.87 |
| Progressive Conservative | John Gee | 2,225 | 22.57 | −13.44 |
| Total valid votes | | 9,860 | 100.00 | |
| Rejected votes | | 51 | | |
| Turnout | | 9,911 | 85.84 | |
| Electors on the lists | | 11,546 | | |
| New Democratic hold | | Swing | | -3.15 |

Manitoba provincial by-election, April 5, 1971: St. Vital Resignation of Jack Hardy
| Party | Candidate | Votes | % | ±% |
|---|---|---|---|---|
| New Democratic | Jim Walding | 3,378 | 35.94 | +0.25 |
| Liberal | Dan Kennedy | 3,083 | 32.80 | +4.49 |
| Progressive Conservative | Kenneth Pratt | 2,925 | 31.12 | −4.89 |
| Independent | Sam Bordman | 13 | 0.14 | |
| Total valid votes | | 9,399 | 99.89 | |
| Rejected and declined ballots | | 10 | 0.11 | |
| Turnout | | 9,409 | 83.05 | +15.01 |
| Electors on the lists | | 11,329 | | |
| New Democratic gain from Progressive Conservative | | Swing | | +2.57 |

1969 Manitoba general election: St. Vital
| Party | Candidate | Votes | % | ±% |
|---|---|---|---|---|
| Progressive Conservative | Jack Hardy | 2,587 | 36.01 | |
| New Democratic | Jim Walding | 2,564 | 35.69 | |
| Liberal | Joe Stangl | 2,034 | 28.31 | |
| Total valid votes | | 7,185 | 100.00 | |
| Rejected votes | | 39 | | |
| Turnout | | 7,224 | 68.04 | |
| Electors on the lists | | 10,617 | | |
| Progressive Conservative hold | | Swing | | |

== Sources ==
Lambert, Geoffrey. "Manitoba," Canadian Annual Review of Politics and Public Affairs, 1988, pp 252–260.

Stewart, Ian. Just One Vote: From Jim Walding's Nomination to Constitutional Defeat (Winnipeg: University of Manitoba Press, 2009).
