= Daniel Kennedy (Manitoba judge) =

Daniel P. Kennedy is a judge and former politician in Manitoba, Canada. He has served on the Court of Queen's Bench of Manitoba since 1984.

== Political candidate ==
Kennedy ran for the Manitoba Liberal Party in the electoral district of St. Vital in a 1971 by-election and the 1973 general election. In the 1971 by-election, he campaigned against the amalgamation of St. Vital into the new "unicity" of Winnipeg. In 1973, he was supported by many Progressive Conservatives as the candidate most likely to defeat New Democratic Party incumbent Jim Walding. He narrowly lost to Walding on both occasions. Ian Stewart describes Kennedy as having been an "ambitious, articulate, and photogenic young lawyer" in this period.

== Judge ==
Kennedy was appointed as a provincial judge on August 30, 1978, and was promoted to the Court of Queen's Bench of Manitoba on June 21, 1984.

He presided over the trial of a prominent Hell's Angels member in 1993, and considered the question of whether a Winnipeg Sun reporter had a right to protect a confidential source. He determined that he would not charge the reporter with contempt of court for refusing to divulge the source, and instead asked the provincial Attorney General to review the matter.

In 1992, Kennedy ruled that it was not a violation of the Canadian Charter of Rights and Freedoms to sentence a defendant to six months in jail for failure to pay parking tickets. This ruling was overturned on appeal. In 1995, he became the first judge in Manitoba to order the repossession of a convict's property under "proceeds of crime" legislation passed six years earlier. The following year, he dismissed two statements a defendant had given to police on the grounds that the statements were made under duress. Partly as a result of this ruling, Winnipeg police began videotaping their talks with suspects the following year.

Kennedy gave a stiff, 13-year sentence to a heroin distributor in 1994, and was quoted as saying, "[m]any of the ills of society, the destruction of our societal fabric, comes because of the illicit use of drugs". In 2003, he gave a 28-month sentence to a man convicted of trafficking ecstasy.

In 1999, Kennedy re-instituted a triple-tax penalty for cigarette smugglers that had been overturned by a lower court. He ruled that this penalty, while severe, did not "shock or outrage standards of decency".

== Electoral record ==
17.80
1973 Manitoba general election: St. Vital
Party	Candidate	Votes	%	±%
New Democratic	Jim Walding	3,870	39.25	+3.56
Liberal	Dan Kennedy	3,765	38.18	+9.87
Progressive Conservative	John Gee	2,225	22.57	−13.44
Total valid votes		9,860	100.00	
Rejected votes		51		
Turnout		9,911	85.84	
Electors on the lists		11,546		
New Democratic hold		Swing		-3.15

Manitoba provincial by-election, April 5, 1971: St. Vital Resignation of Jack Hardy
Party	Candidate	Votes	%	±%
New Democratic	Jim Walding	3,378	35.94	+0.25
Liberal	Dan Kennedy	3,083	32.80	+4.49
Progressive Conservative	Kenneth Pratt	2,925	31.12	−4.89
Independent	Sam Bordman	13	0.14	
Total valid votes		9,399	99.89	
Rejected and declined ballots		10	0.11	
Turnout		9,409	83.05	+15.01
Electors on the lists		11,329		
New Democratic gain from Progressive Conservative		Swing		+2.57
