= Colleen Mayer =

Canadian politician

Minister of Crown Services
- In office August 1, 2018 – September 25, 2019
- Premier: Brian Pallister
- Preceded by: Cliff Cullen
- Succeeded by: Jeff Wharton

Member of the Legislative Assembly of Manitoba for St. Vital
- In office April 19, 2016 – August 12, 2019
- Preceded by: Nancy Allan
- Succeeded by: Jamie Moses

Personal details
- Party: Progressive Conservative

Colleen Mayer is a former Canadian politician and member of the Legislative Assembly of Manitoba, who represented the electoral district of St. Vital as a member of the Progressive Conservative Party of Manitoba from 2016 until 2019. St. Vital was an open seat in the 2016 Manitoba general election, with incumbent MLA Nancy Allan not seeking re-election.

On August 1, 2018, Premier Brian Pallister appointed Mayer to the Executive Council of Manitoba as Minister of Crown Services.

Mayer lost her seat in the 2019 election to New Democrat Jamie Moses, who contested the seat in 2016. She subsequently accepted a position with STARS Air Ambulance as the Director of Development for Manitoba.

In December 2025, Mayer was nominated to lead the Winnipeg Police Board.

== Electoral record ==
2019 Manitoba general election: St. Vital
Party	Candidate	Votes	%	±%	Expenditures
New Democratic	Jamie Moses	4,081	44.44	+10.1	$19,491.65
Progressive Conservative	Colleen Mayer	3,211	34.96	-7.8	$49,161.66
Liberal	Jeffrey Anderson	1,271	13.84	-2.8	$16,801.57
Green	Elizabeth Dickson	499	5.43	-0.9	$0.00
Independent	Baljeet Sharma	62	0.68	–	$790.06
Manitoba First	David Sutherland	60	0.65	–	$1,210.90
Total valid votes		9,184	100.0		
Total rejected ballots					
Turnout			63.7		
Eligible voters					
New Democratic gain from Progressive Conservative		Swing		+9.0	
Source(s) Source: Manitoba. Chief Electoral Officer (2019). Statement of Votes for the 42nd Provincial General Election, September 10, 2019 (PDF) (Report). Winnipeg: Elections Manitoba.

2016 Manitoba general election: St. Vital
Party	Candidate	Votes	%	±%	Expenditures
Progressive Conservative	Colleen Mayer	3,229	39.63	+5.23	$24,705.52
New Democratic	Jamie Moses	2,831	34.74	-25.34	$26,333.60
Liberal	Bryan Van Wilgenburg	1,296	15.90	+10.39	$6,849.49
Green	Kelly Whelan-Enns	791	9.70	+9.70	$50.00
Total valid votes/expense limit		8,147	98.69	-	$43,267.00
Rejected and declined votes		108	1.31		
Turnout		8,255	63.97		
Registered voters		12,905			
Source: Elections Manitoba
