= 1969 Winnipeg municipal election =

The 1969 Winnipeg municipal election was held in October 1969 to elect mayors, councillors and school trustees in the City of Winnipeg and its suburban communities. There was no mayoral election in Winnipeg.

== Winnipeg ==
Each of Winnipeg's three municipal wards elected three councillors, via the single transferable vote method.

- Ward One: Robert Taft, Warren Steen, and June Westbury
- Ward Two: Lloyd Stinson, Robert Steen, and Alan Wade
- Ward Three: Slaw Rebchuk, Joseph Zuken, and Nick Malanchuk

== St. Vital ==
1969 St. Vital municipal election: Mayor
Candidate	Votes	%
(x)Jack Hardy	4,791	72.76
Albert Coggan	1,794	27.24
Total valid votes	6,585	100.00
