= Shirley Render =

Canadian politician

Member of the Legislative Assembly of Manitoba for St. Vital
- In office September 11, 1990 – September 21, 1999
- Preceded by: Bob Rose
- Succeeded by: Nancy Allan

Personal details
- Born: Shirley Hurst; April 1, 1943 (age 83) Winnipeg, Manitoba, Canada
- Spouse: Douglas E. Render
- Education: University of Manitoba (B.A.)
- Occupation: Social worker, teacher, politician

Shirley Render (born April 1, 1943) is a politician in Manitoba, Canada. She was a member of the Legislative Assembly of Manitoba from 1990 to 1999, and was briefly a cabinet minister in the government of Gary Filmon.

== Early life ==
Born Shirley Hurst in Winnipeg, the daughter of Harold and Marg Hurst, she was educated at the University of Manitoba, receiving a Bachelor of Arts degree in 1964 and a Master of Arts degree in 1984. She has worked as a social worker and High School teacher, and has lectured in Psychology at the University of Manitoba. She has also worked as a magazine editor.

She married Douglas E. Render.

== Aviation ==
Render is a member of the Royal Canadian Air Force Association, and has authored two published books on aviation history: Double Cross: The Inside Story of James A. Richardson and Canadian Airways (1999) and No Place for a Lady: the Story of Canadian Women Pilots, 1928-1992 (2000). She is a member of the International Association of Women's Pilots and the Women and History Association, and has served as President of the Western Canada Aviation Museum (though her time as president coincided with a period of financial controversy at the museum).

== Politics ==
Render was first elected to the Manitoba legislature as a Progressive Conservative in the 1990 provincial election in the south-central Winnipeg riding of St. Vital, defeating incumbent Liberal Bob Rose by 118 votes. She was re-elected by a greater margin in the 1995 provincial election, with the social-democratic New Democratic Party (NDP) displacing the Liberals for second place.

Render entered cabinet on February 5, 1999, the date of Premier Gary Filmon's final cabinet shuffle. She was appointed Minister of Consumer and Corporate Affairs, with responsibility for the Gaming Control Act. In the provincial election held later in the year, she lost her seat to NDP candidate Nancy Allan by over 1,500 votes.

Render tried to return to the legislature in Riel, which borders her former district, in the 2003 provincial election, but lost to NDP candidate Christine Melnick by over 1,000 votes.

== Electoral record ==
2003 Manitoba general election: Riel
Party	Candidate	Votes	%	±%	Expenditures
New Democratic	Christine Melnick	4,455	54.03	+7.35	$21,486.24
Progressive Conservative	Shirley Render	3,119	37.83	-6.20	$20,036.18
Liberal	Kristopher Ade	671	8.14	+0.22	$8,594.68

1999 Manitoba general election: St. Vital
Party	Candidate	Votes	%	±%	Expenditures
New Democratic	Nancy Allan	5,298	50.91	+16.29	$24,796.00
Progressive Conservative	Shirley Render	3,699	36.09	-5.38	$30,635.47
Liberal	Lynn Clark	1,099	10.72	-13.19	$10,303.82
Manitoba	Brian Hanslip	188	1.83		$846.32
Total valid votes		10,204	100.00		
Rejected and declined votes		46			
Turnout		10,250	74.04		
Registered voters		13,844			

1995 Manitoba general election: St. Vital
Party	Candidate	Votes	%	±%
Progressive Conservative	Shirley Render	4,021	41.47%	5.17%
New Democratic	Sig Laser	3,357	34.62%	9.05%
Liberal	Timothy Joseph "Tim" Ryan	2,319	23.91%	-11.11%
Total valid votes		9,697	–	–
Rejected		41	–	
Eligible voters / Turnout		13,037	74.38%	1.53%
Source(s) Source: Manitoba. Chief Electoral Officer (1999). Statement of Votes for the 37th Provincial General Election, September 21, 2089 (PDF) (Report). Winnipeg: Elections Manitoba.

1990 Manitoba general election: St. Vital
Party	Candidate	Votes	%	±%
Progressive Conservative	Shirley Render	3,361	36.30%	1.86%
Liberal	Bob Rose	3,243	35.02%	-7.19%
New Democratic	Kathleen McCallum	2,368	25.57%	3.83%
Western Independence	Doug Browning	288	3.11%	1.94%
Total valid votes		9,260	–	–
Rejected		19	–	
Eligible voters / Turnout		12,711	72.85%	-6.09%
Source(s) Source: Manitoba. Chief Electoral Officer (1999). Statement of Votes for the 37th Provincial General Election, September 21, 2086 (PDF) (Report). Winnipeg: Elections Manitoba.

== Current work ==
Render is currently a member of the Community Partnership Executive at CBC Manitoba, and lectures at the Asper School of Business and Red River College. In 2001, she received a Governor General of Canada 125 award. She is currently the executive director of the Western Canada Aviation Museum.

In 2017, the city of Winnipeg opened Shirley Render Park, near St. Vital Park. The site was formerly a St. Vital landfill.

== Published works ==
- Render, Shirley. Double Cross: The Inside Story of James A. Richardson and the Canadian Airways. Vancouver: Douglas & McIntyre, 1999. ISBN 1-55054-722-4.
- Render, Shirley. No Place for a Lady: The Story of Canadian Women Pilots. Winnipeg: Peguis Publishers, 1992, 2000 (2nd ed.). ISBN 0-9694264-2-9.
