= Harvey Carmichael =

Scottish footballer

Personal information
- Date of birth: 20 August 1881
- Place of birth: Tillicoultry, Scotland
- Date of death: 1940 (aged 58–59)
- Position: Goalkeeper

Senior career*
Years	Team	Apps	(Gls)
1902–1904	Tillicoultry Rovers		
1904–1906	Clackmannan		
1906	East Stirlingshire		
1906–1908	Grimsby Town	36	(0)
1908–1911	Millwall Athletic		
1911–191?	Hartlepools United		
- * Club domestic league appearances and goals

Harvey W. Carmichael (20 August 1881 – 1940) was a Scottish professional footballer who played as a goalkeeper.
