= Fred Groves (politician) =

Canadian politician

Frederick Groves (January 28, 1924 in Winnipeg, Manitoba – January 28, 1995) was a politician in Manitoba, Canada. He was a Progressive Conservative member of the Legislative Assembly of Manitoba from 1958 to 1966.

Groves was educated at Daniel McIntyre College and the University of Manitoba. He worked as a chartered accountant before entering political life. He served as a member of the St. Vital council from 1951 to 1956, and became Chairman of Finance and Deputy Mayor in 1956. He was also provincial secretary of the Progressive Conservative Party of Manitoba during this period.

He was first elected to the Manitoba legislature in the 1958 provincial election, defeating his Liberal-Progressive opponent by about 1,300 votes in the Winnipeg area riding of St. Vital. He was returned by comfortable margins in the general elections of 1959 and 1962, and was a backbench supporter of Dufferin Roblin's government throughout his time in the legislature.

On one occasion, Groves voted against the Roblin government on an initiative to grant use of public school facilities and services to separate schools. Although many in the PC caucus opposed this measure, Groves was the only PC MLA to actually vote against it. Some caucus members saw this as disloyalty, and called for him to be expelled; Roblin did not act on this request.

Groves's own community became involved in a school controversy in 1963-64, when six francophone families took their children out of school to protest bus fees for parochial (i.e. Catholic) school students. The matter was settled after three months. During the controversy, Groves declared his opposition to providing "any aid directly or indirectly to parochial schools", and said that he would "defend the rights of the majority". He complained of receiving "vicious, ignorant and crude, anonymous letters" from his opponents on the subject.

Groves died in Winnipeg on his 71st birthday.
