= Jack Hardy (politician) =

Canadian politician (1924–2006)

Personal details
- Born: November 1, 1924
- Died: August 22, 2006 (aged 81)

Jackson Alexander "Jack" Hardy (November 1, 1924 – August 22, 2006) was a politician in Manitoba, Canada. He was the mayor of St. Vital, and served in the Legislative Assembly of Manitoba from 1969 to 1971 as a member of the Progressive Conservative Party.

== Early life and career ==
The son of Dufferin A. Hardy and Martha Gracer, Hardy was born in Thunder Bay, Ontario. He was a member of the Royal Canadian Air Force during World War II, and subsequently became an accountant at the Fort William Grain Elevator. Transferred to Winnipeg in 1950, he settled in the suburban community of St. Vital.

Hardy married Catherine Mary Murray in 1945.

== Politician ==
Hardy was a municipal councillor in St. Vital for four years, and spent a further five years as the community's mayor. He was elected to the Manitoba legislature in the 1969 provincial election, defeating New Democratic Party candidate Jim Walding by only 23 votes in the St. Vital electoral division. He continued to serve as mayor of St. Vital, and was re-elected to his municipal position in late 1969. He opposed the amalgamation of St. Vital into the new "unicity" of Winnipeg.

Hardy's time in the legislature was brief. He was absent from the province for much of 1970, and was hired as the assistant city manager for Terrance, British Columbia late in the year. Some described his behaviour during this time as erratic. He was quoted as saying, "I have to earn a living, and in Manitoba -- it is totally impossible for a politician to do it solely in politics." He left Manitoba in December 1970, and formally resigned his seat in the legislature on February 16, 1971. In the 1973 provincial election, he endorsed Liberal candidate Dan Kennedy.

Hardy retired to Vernon, British Columbia, and died at home there in 2006 after a short illness.

== Electoral record ==
Provincial

1969 Manitoba general election: St. Vital
Party	Candidate	Votes	%	±%
Progressive Conservative	Jack Hardy	2,587	36.01	
New Democratic	Jim Walding	2,564	35.69	
Liberal	Joe Stangl	2,034	28.31	
Total valid votes		7,185	100.00	
Rejected votes		39		
Turnout		7,224	68.04	
Electors on the lists		10,617		
Progressive Conservative hold		Swing		

Municipal

1969 St. Vital municipal election: Mayor
Candidate	Votes	%
(x)Jack Hardy	4,791	72.76
Albert Coggan	1,794	27.24
Total valid votes	6,585	100.00

1967 St. Vital municipal election: Mayor
Candidate	Votes	%
(x)Jack Hardy	accl.	

1965 St. Vital municipal election: Mayor
Candidate	Votes	%
Jack Hardy	4,732	59.62
A. Alvin Winslow	1,619	20.40
(x)Harry Collins	1,297	16.34
J. Harry Graham	289	3.64
Total valid votes	7,937	100.00

1963 St. Vital municipal election: Council (four elected)
Candidate	Votes	%
(x)Florence Pierce	1,850	27.77
(x)Jack Hardy	1,835	27.54
(x)Alvin Winslow	1,557	23.37
Harold Button	622	9.34
Harry Brown	453	6.80
Dudley Smallwood	345	5.18
Total valid votes	6,662	100.00

This election was determined by a single transferable ballot. The quota for election on the first ballot was 1,333 votes; Pierce, Hardy, and Winslow were declared elected to two-year terms. At the end of the fourth transfer, Button had 1,385 votes, Brown 1,197 and Smallwood 669. Button was declared elected to a one-year term, replacing the retiring Fred Brennan.
