= Bob Rose (Winnipeg politician) =

Canadian politician

Robert D. (Bob) Rose (born July 16, 1931) is a politician in Manitoba, Canada. He was a member of the Legislative Assembly of Manitoba from 1988 to 1990, representing the south Winnipeg riding of St. Vital for the Manitoba Liberal Party.

Born in Winnipeg, Manitoba, Rose worked as a broker before entering political life.

== Political career ==
=== Municipal ===
In the 1983 Winnipeg municipal elections, Rose was elected as a school trustee in the St. Vital school division at his first attempt. He served one three-year term. In the 1986 Winnipeg municipal election, he was elected to Winnipeg City Council, for the St. Vital ward of Glenlawn, defeating Al Ducharme, who had represented the ward since 1977.

=== Provincial ===
The New Democratic Party government of Manitoba, led by Howard Pawley, fell in 1988 when NDP backbencher Jim Walding—the Member of the Legislative Assembly for St. Vital—took the unprecedented step of voting against his own government's budget. Rose ran in the 1988 provincial election in St. Vital and defeated his closest competitor, Progressive Conservative candidate Paul Herriot, by 817 votes; Walding did not stand. The Liberals increased their legislative strength from one to twenty in this election, and Rose sat as a member of the official opposition for the next two years. In the election of 1990, he lost by 118 votes to Tory Shirley Render amid a general decline in support for his party. He has not sought a return to political life since this time.

=== Election results ===
1986 Winnipeg municipal election: Councillor, Glenlawn Ward
Party	Candidate	Votes	%
Liberal	Bob Rose	2,825	53.44
Conservative	(x)Al Ducharme	2,461	46.56
Source: City of Winnipeg

1988 Manitoba general election: St. Vital
Party	Candidate	Votes	%	±%
Liberal	Bob Rose	4,431	42.22	+27.16
Progressive Conservative	Paul Herriot	3,614	34.43	-5.19
New Democratic	Gerri Unwin	2,282	21.74	-23.59
Western Independence	Katharina Cameron	123	1.17	n/a
Libertarian	Trevor Wiebe	46	0.44	n/a
Total valid votes		10,496	100.00	-
Rejected ballots		18	–	–
Turnout		10,514	79.08	
Eligible voters		13,296		
Source: Elections Manitoba
