= St. Vital (electoral district) =

Provincial electoral district in Manitoba, Canada

Coordinates: 49.853°N 97.106°W

Manitoba electoral district
- Location in Winnipeg

Provincial electoral district
- Legislature: Legislative Assembly of Manitoba
MLA
Jamie Moses
New Democratic
- District created: 1957
- First contested: 1958
- Last contested: 2023

St. Vital (French: Saint-Vital) is a provincial electoral district of Manitoba, Canada. It was originally established in 1870, disestablished in 1879, and re-established by redistribution in 1957 into the modern riding.

== Historical riding ==
The original St. Vital riding was established at the time of the province's creation in 1870, as one of twelve "francophone" constituencies. It was eliminated in 1879, after a redistribution process which reduced the level of francophone representation in the province.

=== List of provincial representatives (1870–1879) ===
Name	Party	Took office	Left office
André Beauchemin	Government/French Party	1870	1874
Joseph Lemay	Government/French Party	1874	1878
Maxime Goulet	Government/French Party	1878	1879
	Opposition/French Party	1878	1879

== Current riding ==
The modern St. Vital riding was created by redistribution in 1957, and has formally existed since the provincial election of 1958. The riding is located in the southeastern section of the City of Winnipeg.

St. Vital was bordered to the east by St. Boniface and Southdale, to the south by Riel, to the north by St. Boniface and to the west by Riel, Lord Roberts and Fort Garry (the latter two across the Red River of the North). As of the 2019 Manitoba election, it is bordered to the north by St. Boniface, to the east by Southdale, to the southeast by Lagimodière, to the south by Riel, to the west by Fort Garry, and to the northwest by Fort Rouge (the latter two across the Red River).

The riding's population in 1996 was 20,255. Its character is mostly middle-class, although 28% of the riding's residents are categorized as low-income. In 1999, the average family income was $44,868, and the unemployment rate was 7.90%. Ten per cent of the riding's residents are francophone, and 7% are aboriginal. Almost half the riding's dwellings are rental units.

The service sector accounts for 16% of St. Vital's industry, with a further 13% in the retail trade.

St. Vital was represented by members of the Progressive Conservative Party from 1958 to 1971. Since then, it has generally been represented by members of the New Democratic Party (NDP), although the Liberals held the seat for one term from 1988 to 1990, and the Progressive Conservatives for two terms from 1990 to 1999.

=== List of provincial representatives (1958–present) ===
Name	Party	Took office	Left office
Fred Groves	PC	1958	1966
Donald Craik	PC	1966	1969
Jack Hardy	PC	1969	1971
Jim Walding	NDP	1971	1988
Bob Rose	Lib	1988	1990
Shirley Render	PC	1990	1999
Nancy Allan	NDP	1999	2016
Colleen Mayer	PC	2016	2019
Jamie Moses	NDP	2019	Present

== Electoral results (1870–1879) ==
=== 1870 ===
1870 Manitoba general election
Party	Candidate	Votes	%
Government	André Beauchemin	Acclaimed	–
Total valid votes			–
Rejected		N/A	–
Eligible voters / Turnout		N/A	–
Source(s) Source: Manitoba. Chief Electoral Officer (1999). Statement of Votes for the 37th Provincial General Election, September 21, 1999 (PDF) (Report). Winnipeg: Elections Manitoba.

=== 1874 ===
1874 Manitoba general election
Party	Candidate	Votes	%	±%
Government	Joseph Lemay	72	60.50%	–
Undeclared	Médéric Foucher	47	39.50%	–
Total valid votes		119	–	–
Rejected		N/A	–	
Eligible voters / Turnout		166	71.69%	–
Source(s) Source: Manitoba. Chief Electoral Officer (1999). Statement of Votes for the 37th Provincial General Election, September 21, 2000 (PDF) (Report). Winnipeg: Elections Manitoba.

=== 1878 ===
1878 Manitoba general election
Party	Candidate	Votes	%	±%
Undeclared	Maxime Goulet	83	59.29%	19.79%
Undeclared	Alexander Kittson	55	39.29%	-0.21%
Undeclared	J. Hamelin	2	1.43%	-38.07%
Total valid votes		140	–	–
Rejected		N/A	–	
Eligible voters / Turnout		164	85.37%	13.68%
Source(s) Source: Manitoba. Chief Electoral Officer (1999). Statement of Votes for the 37th Provincial General Election, September 21, 2004 (PDF) (Report). Winnipeg: Elections Manitoba.

== Electoral results (1958–present) ==
=== 1958 ===
1958 Manitoba general election
Party	Candidate	Votes	%	±%
Progressive Conservative	Fred Groves	3,616	48.07%	–
Liberal–Progressive	William R. Appleby	2,331	30.98%	–
Co-operative Commonwealth	Leslie C. Foden	1,334	17.73%	–
Independent	Percy B. Hayward	242	3.22%	–
Total valid votes		7,523	–	–
Rejected		39	–	
Eligible voters / Turnout		12,758	58.97%	–
Source(s) Source: Manitoba. Chief Electoral Officer (1999). Statement of Votes for the 37th Provincial General Election, September 21, 2066 (PDF) (Report). Winnipeg: Elections Manitoba.

=== 1959 ===
1959 Manitoba general election
Party	Candidate	Votes	%	±%
Progressive Conservative	Fred Groves	4,599	54.73%	6.66%
Liberal–Progressive	George Goulet	1,946	23.16%	-7.83%
Co-operative Commonwealth	Joseph Trager	1,858	22.11%	4.38%
Total valid votes		8,403	–	–
Rejected		56	–	
Eligible voters / Turnout		12,767	65.82%	6.85%
Source(s) Source: Manitoba. Chief Electoral Officer (1999). Statement of Votes for the 37th Provincial General Election, September 21, 2067 (PDF) (Report). Winnipeg: Elections Manitoba.

=== 1962 ===
1962 Manitoba general election
Party	Candidate	Votes	%	±%
Progressive Conservative	Fred Groves	3,626	45.05%	-9.68%
Liberal	Douglas E. Honeyman	2,605	32.36%	9.20%
New Democratic	Clare Martineau	1,023	12.71%	-9.40%
Independent	Fred H. Brennan	795	9.88%	–
Total valid votes		8,049	–	–
Rejected		64	–	
Eligible voters / Turnout		13,558	59.37%	-6.45%
Source(s) Source: Manitoba. Chief Electoral Officer (1999). Statement of Votes for the 37th Provincial General Election, September 21, 2069 (PDF) (Report). Winnipeg: Elections Manitoba.

=== 1966 ===
1966 Manitoba general election
Party	Candidate	Votes	%	±%
Progressive Conservative	Donald Craik	4,432	45.84%	0.79%
Liberal	Douglas E. Honeyman	2,927	30.27%	-2.09%
New Democratic	William Hutton	2,310	23.89%	11.18%
Total valid votes		9,669	–	–
Rejected		30	–	
Eligible voters / Turnout		14,226	67.97%	8.60%
Source(s) Source: Manitoba. Chief Electoral Officer (1999). Statement of Votes for the 37th Provincial General Election, September 21, 2071 (PDF) (Report). Winnipeg: Elections Manitoba.

=== 1969 ===
1969 Manitoba general election
Party	Candidate	Votes	%	±%
Progressive Conservative	Jack Hardy	2,587	36.01	
New Democratic	Jim Walding	2,564	35.69	
Liberal	Joe Stangl	2,034	28.31	
Total valid votes		7,185	100.00	
Rejected votes		39		
Turnout		7,224	68.04	
Electors on the lists		10,617		
Progressive Conservative hold		Swing		

=== 1971 by-election ===
Manitoba provincial by-election, April 5, 1971 Resignation of Jack Hardy
Party	Candidate	Votes	%	±%
New Democratic	Jim Walding	3,378	35.94	+0.25
Liberal	Dan Kennedy	3,083	32.80	+4.49
Progressive Conservative	Kenneth Pratt	2,925	31.12	−4.89
Independent	Sam Bordman	13	0.14	
Total valid votes		9,399	99.89	
Rejected and declined ballots		10	0.11	
Turnout		9,409	83.05	+15.01
Electors on the lists		11,329		
New Democratic gain from Progressive Conservative		Swing		+2.57

=== 1973 ===
17.80
1973 Manitoba general election
Party	Candidate	Votes	%	±%
New Democratic	Jim Walding	3,870	39.25	+3.56
Liberal	Dan Kennedy	3,765	38.18	+9.87
Progressive Conservative	John Gee	2,225	22.57	−13.44
Total valid votes		9,860	100.00	
Rejected votes		51		
Turnout		9,911	85.84	
Electors on the lists		11,546		
New Democratic hold		Swing		-3.15

=== 1977 ===
1977 Manitoba general election
Party	Candidate	Votes	%	±%
New Democratic	Jim Walding	3,924	41.62	+2.37
Progressive Conservative	Gil Shaw	3,390	35.95	+13.38
Liberal	Eddie Coutu	2,115	22.43	−15.75
Total valid votes		9,429	100.00	
Rejected votes		18		
Turnout		9,447	84.70	−1.14
Electors on the lists		11,154		
New Democratic hold		Swing		-5.50

=== 1981 ===
1981 Manitoba general election
Party	Candidate	Votes	%	±%
New Democratic	Jim Walding	5,504	52.80	+11.18
Progressive Conservative	John Robertson	4,236	40.64	+4.69
Liberal	Gord Patterson	684	6.56	-15.87
Total valid votes		10,424	100.00	
Rejected votes		34		
Turnout		10,458	80.61	
Electors on the lists		12,974		
New Democratic hold		Swing		+3.24

=== 1986 ===
1986 Manitoba general election
Party	Candidate	Votes	%	±%
New Democratic	Jim Walding	4,430	45.32	−7.48
Progressive Conservative	Paul Herriot	3,872	39.62	−1.02
Liberal	Walter Pederson	1,472	15.06	+8.50
Total valid votes		9,774	–	–
Rejected		31	–	
Eligible voters / turnout		13,285	73.57%	-6.77%
New Democratic hold		Swing		-3.23
Source: Elections Manitoba

=== 1988 ===
1988 Manitoba general election
Party	Candidate	Votes	%	±%
Liberal	Bob Rose	4,431	42.22	+27.16
Progressive Conservative	Paul Herriot	3,614	34.43	-5.19
New Democratic	Gerri Unwin	2,282	21.74	-23.59
Western Independence	Katharina Cameron	123	1.17	n/a
Libertarian	Trevor Wiebe	46	0.44	n/a
Total valid votes		10,496	100.00	-
Rejected ballots		18	–	–
Turnout		10,514	79.08	
Eligible voters		13,296		
Liberal gain from New Democratic		Swing		+25.37
Source: Elections Manitoba

=== 1990 ===
1990 Manitoba general election
Party	Candidate	Votes	%	±%
Progressive Conservative	Shirley Render	3,361	36.30%	1.86%
Liberal	Bob Rose	3,243	35.02%	-7.19%
New Democratic	Kathleen McCallum	2,368	25.57%	3.83%
Western Independence	Doug Browning	288	3.11%	1.94%
Total valid votes		9,260	–	–
Rejected		19	–	
Eligible voters / Turnout		12,711	72.85%	-6.09%
Source(s) Source: Manitoba. Chief Electoral Officer (1999). Statement of Votes for the 37th Provincial General Election, September 21, 2086 (PDF) (Report). Winnipeg: Elections Manitoba.

=== 1995 ===
1995 Manitoba general election
Party	Candidate	Votes	%	±%
Progressive Conservative	Shirley Render	4,021	41.47%	5.17%
New Democratic	Sig Laser	3,357	34.62%	9.05%
Liberal	Timothy Joseph "Tim" Ryan	2,319	23.91%	-11.11%
Total valid votes		9,697	–	–
Rejected		41	–	
Eligible voters / Turnout		13,037	74.38%	1.53%
Source(s) Source: Manitoba. Chief Electoral Officer (1999). Statement of Votes for the 37th Provincial General Election, September 21, 2089 (PDF) (Report). Winnipeg: Elections Manitoba.

=== 1999 ===
1999 Manitoba general election: St. Vital
Party	Candidate	Votes	%	±%	Expenditures
New Democratic	Nancy Allan	5,298	50.91	+16.29	$24,796.00
Progressive Conservative	Shirley Render	3,699	36.09	-5.38	$30,635.47
Liberal	Lynn Clark	1,099	10.72	-13.19	$10,303.82
Manitoba	Brian Hanslip	188	1.83		$846.32
Total valid votes		10,204	100.00		
Rejected and declined votes		46			
Turnout		10,250	74.04		
Registered voters		13,844			

=== 2003 ===
2003 Manitoba general election: St. Vital
Party	Candidate	Votes	%	±%	Expenditures
New Democratic	Nancy Allan	4,409	63.43	+12.52	$12,969.78
Progressive Conservative	Kirsty Reilly	1,656	23.82	-12.27	$3,931.49
Liberal	Justin Beaudry	707	10.17	-0.55	$1,713.63
Green	Nelson Morrison	179	2.58		$53.60
Total valid votes		6,951	100.00		
Rejected and declined votes		43			
Turnout		6,994	52.16		
Registered voters		13,409			

=== 2007 ===
2007 Manitoba general election: St. Vital
Party	Candidate	Votes	%	±%	Expenditures
New Democratic	Nancy Allan	4,611	61.74	−1.79	$16,126.19
Progressive Conservative	Grant Cooper	1,754	23.41	−0.41	$16,686.95
Liberal	Harry Wolbert	776	10.36	+0.19	$4,889.96
Green	Kristine Koster	351	4.68	+2.10	$248.50
Total valid votes		7,492	100.00		
Rejected and declined votes		25			
Turnout		7,517	58.46	+6.30	
Registered voters		12,859			

=== 2011 ===
2011 Manitoba general election
Party	Candidate	Votes	%	±%	Expenditures
New Democratic	Nancy Allan	5,023	60.08	−1.66	$20,791.20
Progressive Conservative	Mike Brown	2,876	34.40	+10.99	$25,083.94
Liberal	Harry Wolbert	461	5.51	−4.85	$902.02
Total valid votes		8,360	99.53		
Rejected and declined votes		39	0.46		
Turnout		8,399	60.35		
Registered voters		13,918			
Majority		2,147	25.68		
Source: Elections Manitoba

=== 2016 ===
2016 Manitoba general election
Party	Candidate	Votes	%	±%	Expenditures
Progressive Conservative	Colleen Mayer	3,229	39.63	+5.23	$24,705.52
New Democratic	Jamie Moses	2,831	34.74	-25.34	$26,333.60
Liberal	Bryan Van Wilgenburg	1,296	15.90	+10.39	$6,849.49
Green	Kelly Whelan-Enns	791	9.70	+9.70	$50.00
Total valid votes/expense limit		8,147	98.69	-	$43,267.00
Rejected and declined votes		108	1.31		
Turnout		8,255	63.97		
Registered voters		12,905			
Source: Elections Manitoba

=== 2019 ===
2016 provincial election redistributed results
Party	%
Progressive Conservative	42.8
New Democratic	34.3
Liberal	16.6
Green	6.3

2019 Manitoba general election
Party	Candidate	Votes	%	±%	Expenditures
New Democratic	Jamie Moses	4,081	44.44	+10.1	$19,491.65
Progressive Conservative	Colleen Mayer	3,211	34.96	-7.8	$49,161.66
Liberal	Jeffrey Anderson	1,271	13.84	-2.8	$16,801.57
Green	Elizabeth Dickson	499	5.43	-0.9	$0.00
Independent	Baljeet Sharma	62	0.68	–	$790.06
Manitoba First	David Sutherland	60	0.65	–	$1,210.90
Total valid votes		9,184	100.0		
Total rejected ballots					
Turnout			63.7		
Eligible voters					
New Democratic gain from Progressive Conservative		Swing		+9.0	
Source(s) Source: Manitoba. Chief Electoral Officer (2019). Statement of Votes for the 42nd Provincial General Election, September 10, 2019 (PDF) (Report). Winnipeg: Elections Manitoba.

=== 2023 ===
2023 Manitoba general election
Party	Candidate	Votes	%	±%	Expenditures
New Democratic	Jamie Moses	5,288	61.15	+16.71	$17,589.33
Progressive Conservative	Saima Aziz	2,537	29.34	-5.63	$19,348.38
Liberal	Peter Bastians	823	9.52	-4.32	not filed
Total valid votes/expense limit		8,648	99.45	–	$59,566.00
Total rejected and declined ballots		48	0.55	–	
Turnout		8,696	56.88	-3.89	
Eligible voters		15,287			
New Democratic hold		Swing		+11.17	
Source(s) Source: Elections Manitoba

== Previous boundaries ==
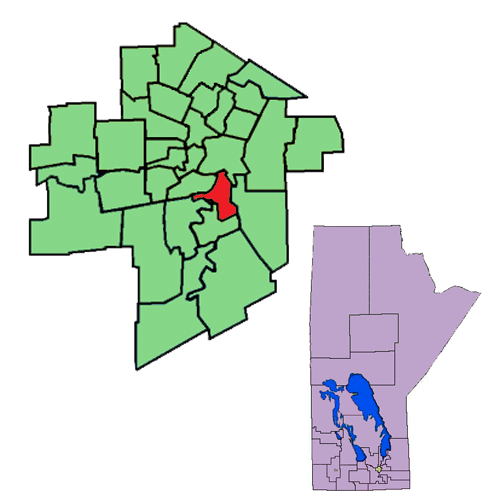
The 1999–2011 boundaries for St. Vital highlighted in red.

== See also ==
- List of Manitoba provincial electoral districts
- Canadian provincial electoral districts
