= Nancy Allan =

Canadian politician (born 1952)

Manitoba Minister of Education
- In office November 3, 2009 – October 18, 2013
- Premier: Greg Selinger
- Preceded by: Peter Bjornson
- Succeeded by: James Allum

Manitoba Minister of Labour and Immigration
- In office November 4, 2003 – November 3, 2009
- Premier: Gary Doer
- Preceded by: Steve Ashton
- Succeeded by: Jennifer Howard

Member of the Legislative Assembly of Manitoba for St. Vital
- In office September 21, 1999 – April 19, 2016
- Preceded by: Shirley Render
- Succeeded by: Colleen Mayer

St. Boniface School Division School Trustee
- In office 1998–1999

Norwood School Division School Trustee
- In office 1995–1998

Personal details
- Born: July 25, 1952 (age 74) Winnipeg, Manitoba
- Party: New Democratic Party
- Education: MacGregor Collegiate

Nancy Allan (born July 25, 1952, in Winnipeg, Manitoba) is a politician in Manitoba, Canada. She was a cabinet minister in the New Democratic Party governments of premiers Gary Doer and Greg Selinger.

Allan was raised in MacGregor, Manitoba, and was educated at MacGregor Collegiate. From 1990 to 1994, she was director of development for the Canadian Diabetes Association. She worked for the Manitoba Motion Picture Industries Association from 1994 to 1995, and then as a consultant for small business and non-profit organizations from 1995 to 1999. She has also taught two continuing education courses at the University of Winnipeg.

Allan began her political career as a school trustee, serving on the Norwood School Division from 1995 to 1998 and the St. Boniface School Division from 1998 to 1999. She was elected to the Legislative Assembly of Manitoba in the 1999 provincial election, defeating incumbent Progressive Conservative MLA Shirley Render in the south-central Winnipeg riding of St. Vital by 5,218 votes to 3,699.

In 2003 she supported Bill Blaikie's bid to become leader of the federal New Democratic Party.

In the 2003 election Allan was re-elected with over 63% of the popular vote. On November 4, 2003, she entered cabinet as Minister of Labour of Immigration, with responsibility for Multiculturalism, Status of Women and administration of the Workers Compensation Act. Allan was re-elected in the 2007 provincial election.

After Greg Selinger succeeded Gary Doer as premier of Manitoba, he appointed Allan as the Minister of Education on November 3, 2009.

During her term as education minister, Allan introduced anti-bullying legislation: Bill 18, the public schools amendment act (safe and inclusive schools). Religious organizations criticized the legislation, claiming it infringed on freedom of religion by requiring faith-based schools to support the creation of gay–straight alliances if initiated by students. The federal Minister of Public Safety at the time, Vic Toews, said that he believed the bill violated the Canadian Charter of Rights and Freedoms. The bill passed into law in September 2013.

On October 18, 2013, Nancy Allan was removed from the post of education minister by Premier Greg Selinger.

== Electoral record ==
2011 Manitoba general election: St. Vital
Party	Candidate	Votes	%	±%	Expenditures
New Democratic	Nancy Allan	5,023	60.08	−1.66	$20,791.20
Progressive Conservative	Mike Brown	2,876	34.40	+10.99	$25,083.94
Liberal	Harry Wolbert	461	5.51	−4.85	$902.02
Total valid votes		8,360	99.53		
Rejected and declined votes		39	0.46		
Turnout		8,399	60.35		
Registered voters		13,918			
Majority		2,147	25.68		
Source: Elections Manitoba

2007 Manitoba general election: St. Vital
Party	Candidate	Votes	%	±%	Expenditures
New Democratic	Nancy Allan	4,611	61.74	−1.79	$16,126.19
Progressive Conservative	Grant Cooper	1,754	23.41	−0.41	$16,686.95
Liberal	Harry Wolbert	776	10.36	+0.19	$4,889.96
Green	Kristine Koster	351	4.68	+2.10	$248.50
Total valid votes		7,492	100.00		
Rejected and declined votes		25			
Turnout		7,517	58.46	+6.30	
Registered voters		12,859			

2003 Manitoba general election: St. Vital
Party	Candidate	Votes	%	±%	Expenditures
New Democratic	Nancy Allan	4,409	63.43	+12.52	$12,969.78
Progressive Conservative	Kirsty Reilly	1,656	23.82	-12.27	$3,931.49
Liberal	Justin Beaudry	707	10.17	-0.55	$1,713.63
Green	Nelson Morrison	179	2.58		$53.60
Total valid votes		6,951	100.00		
Rejected and declined votes		43			
Turnout		6,994	52.16		
Registered voters		13,409			

1999 Manitoba general election: St. Vital
Party	Candidate	Votes	%	±%	Expenditures
New Democratic	Nancy Allan	5,298	50.91	+16.29	$24,796.00
Progressive Conservative	Shirley Render	3,699	36.09	-5.38	$30,635.47
Liberal	Lynn Clark	1,099	10.72	-13.19	$10,303.82
Manitoba	Brian Hanslip	188	1.83		$846.32
Total valid votes		10,204	100.00		
Rejected and declined votes		46			
Turnout		10,250	74.04		
Registered voters		13,844			

Legislative Assembly of Manitoba
Preceded by Shirley Render	Member of the Legislative Assembly for St. Vital; September 21, 1999 – April 19, 2016	Succeeded by Colleen Mayer
Political offices
Preceded by Steve Ashton	Manitoba Minister of Labour and immigration November 4, 2003 – November 3, 2009	Succeeded by Jennifer Howard
Preceded by Peter Bjornson as Manitoba Minister of Education, Citizenship and Youth	Manitoba Minister of Education; November 3, 2009 – October 18, 2013	Succeeded by James Allum as Manitoba Minister of Education and Advanced Learning
