= Gary Doer =

Premier of Manitoba from 1999 to 2009

Gary Doer OM
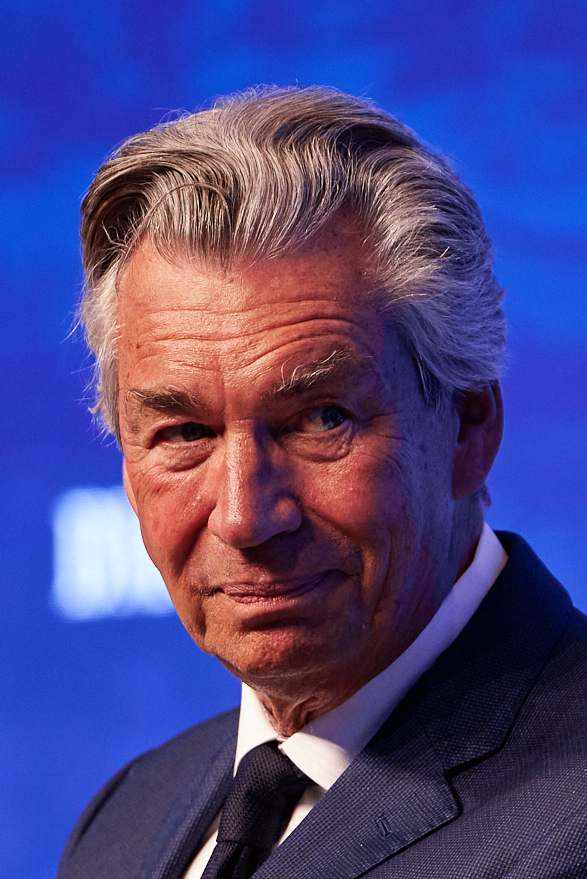
- Doer in 2023

Canadian Ambassador to the United States
- In office 19 October 2009 – 3 March 2016
- Prime Minister: Stephen Harper; Justin Trudeau
- Preceded by: Michael Wilson
- Succeeded by: David MacNaughton

20th Premier of Manitoba
- In office 5 October 1999 – 19 October 2009
- Monarch: Elizabeth II
- Lieutenant Governor: Peter Liba; John Harvard; Philip S. Lee
- Deputy: Jean Friesen; Rosann Wowchuk
- Preceded by: Gary Filmon
- Succeeded by: Greg Selinger

Leader of the Opposition in the Legislative Assembly of Manitoba
- In office August 7, 1990 – October 5, 1999
- Preceded by: Sharon Carstairs
- Succeeded by: Gary Filmon

Leader of the Second Opposition in the Legislative Assembly of Manitoba
- In office May 9, 1988 – August 7, 1990
- Preceded by: Israel Asper (1975)
- Succeeded by: Sharon Carstairs

Leader of the Manitoba New Democratic Party
- In office 30 March 1988 – 17 October 2009
- Preceded by: Howard Pawley
- Succeeded by: Greg Selinger

Minister of Crown Investments in the Government of Manitoba
- In office 4 February 1987 – 9 May 1988
- Preceded by: Vic Schroeder
- Succeeded by: position eliminated

Minister in the Government of Manitoba responsible for the Manitoba Telephone System
- In office 4 February 1987 – 9 May 1988
- Preceded by: Al Mackling
- Succeeded by: Glen Findlay

Minister of Urban Affairs in the Government of Manitoba
- In office 17 April 1986 – 9 May 1988
- Preceded by: Laurent Desjardins
- Succeeded by: Gerald Ducharme

Minister in the Government of Manitoba responsible for the Accountability of Crown Corporations
- In office 19 August 1987 – 9 May 1988
- Preceded by: position created
- Succeeded by: Clayton Manness

Minister in the Government of Manitoba responsible for the Liquor Control Act
- In office 21 September 1987 – 9 May 1988
- Preceded by: Roland Penner
- Succeeded by: James McCrae

Member of the Legislative Assembly of Manitoba for Concordia
- In office 18 March 1986 – 19 October 2009
- Preceded by: Peter Fox
- Succeeded by: Matt Wiebe

President of the Manitoba Government Employees' Association
- In office 1979–1986
- Preceded by: William Jackson
- Succeeded by: Peter Olfert

Personal details
- Born: Gary Albert Doer; 31 March 1948 (age 78) Winnipeg, Manitoba, Canada
- Party: New Democratic
- Spouse: Ginny Devine (m. 1988)

Gary Albert Doer OM (born 31 March 1948) is a former Canadian politician and diplomat from Winnipeg, Manitoba, Canada. He served as Canada's ambassador to the United States from 19 October 2009, to 3 March 2016. Doer previously served as the 20th premier of Manitoba from 1999 to 2009, leading a New Democratic Party government.

After his term as envoy to Washington, Doer took up a position as senior business advisor with the global law firm Dentons and was retained by the government of Alberta to lobby the Trump administration on the softwood lumber dispute. Doer is a member of the Inter-American Dialogue.

== Early life and career ==
Gary Doer was born to a middle class family in Winnipeg, Manitoba. His background is German and Welsh. He graduated from St. Paul's High School and went on to study political science and sociology at the University of Manitoba for one year where he was a member of Tau Kappa Epsilon fraternity, but left to become a corrections officer at the Vaughan Street Detention Centre. He later rose to become deputy superintendent of the Manitoba Youth Centre. Doer's work environment was not always safe: he once had to deal with a hostage taking situation, and was attacked with a baseball bat on another occasion.

Doer became president of the Manitoba Government Employees' Association in 1979, and served in this capacity until 1986. He also held prominent positions with the Manitoba Federation of Labour and the National Union of Public and General Employees, served as a director of the Winnipeg Blue Bombers, and became a governor of the University of Manitoba. In 1983, he negotiated an agreement with the provincial government of Howard Pawley in which civil servants agreed to delay a wage increase in return for a guarantee of no layoffs or wage rollbacks. The following year, he openly criticized Dennis McDermott's leadership of the Canadian Labour Congress.

Doer first joined the New Democratic Party in the 1970s, and worked for the party in the 1973 provincial election. He discontinued his membership in 1975 to preserve the neutrality of his union, and was later courted by both the New Democrats and Progressive Conservatives to run for public office. He rejoined the NDP in 1986, and was a candidate in that year's provincial election.

== Cabinet minister ==
Doer was elected to the Legislative Assembly of Manitoba in the 1986 provincial election for the northeast Winnipeg division of Concordia. He joined the government of Premier Howard Pawley on 17 April 1986, as Minister of Urban Affairs, and was given additional responsibilities as Minister responsible for the Manitoba Telephone System on 2 December of the same year. Doer ordered a Royal Canadian Mounted Police probe of the MTS soon after his appointment, and worked to reform its practices following a failed investment in Saudi Arabia. He soon developed a reputation as a "fixer", working as a trouble-shooter in difficult fields.

Doer was given further responsibilities as Minister of Crown Investments on 5 February 1987, and was later named as Minister responsible for the Accountability of Crown Corporations (19 August 1987) and Minister responsible for the Liquor Control Act (21 September 1987). Seen as a rising star in the party, he was sometimes mentioned as a future leader.

The Pawley government was sustained by a narrow legislative majority after the 1986 election, and was defeated on 8 March 1988, when disgruntled backbencher Jim Walding voted with the opposition on a budget non-confidence motion. Pawley resigned as NDP leader the next day, and called a new general election for 26 April.

== NDP leader ==
=== Leadership election ===
Doer was the first declared candidate in the Manitoba New Democratic Party's 1988 leadership contest. He was supported by cabinet ministers Vic Schroeder, Myrna Phillips, Muriel Smith, Leonard Evans, Jerry Storie and Wilson Parasiuk, and by federal Members of Parliament Rod Murphy and David Orlikow. He also received an endorsement from the Manitoba Federation of Labour. Doer emphasized his experience in managing large organizations, and called for pay equity legislation to be introduced within a year of his election. He narrowly defeated rival candidate Len Harapiak on the third ballot of the party's leadership convention in Winnipeg. He was not sworn in as premier, as the legislature had already been dissolved.

Doer became leader of the Manitoba NDP when the party was at a low ebb of popularity. An internal poll before the election showed that they had only 6% popular support, and some NDP workers privately worried that they could lose all of their legislative seats. Many believed Doer was their best hope for a recovery. Support for the NDP increased to 19% during the leadership campaign, and to 23% after Doer was chosen as Pawley's successor. The party nevertheless remained in third place, and faced an uphill struggle in the 1988 election.

=== 1988 election ===
Doer promised a $58 million tax cut, and opposed the federal government's free trade deal with the United States of America. He indicated that he was open to the possibility of amending the Meech Lake Accord, a federal proposal for constitutional reform. He also promised to build more community health centres, and supported home renovations for senior citizens and the disabled.

The NDP won 12 out of 57 seats, while the Progressive Conservatives under Gary Filmon won 25 seats and the Liberals under Sharon Carstairs jumped from one seat to twenty. Although the NDP was knocked down to third place, it still held the balance of power. Doer rejected the possibility of forming a coalition government with the Liberals. Instead, he opted to tolerate a PC minority government, clearing the way for Filmon to become premier with the Liberals as the Official Opposition. He was not personally blamed for his party's loss, and continued as party leader. The NDP chose not to defeat Filmon's government during confidence votes in late 1988 and early 1989, as Doer argued the public would not support another election for a legislature less than a year old.

Doer married Ginny Devine, who had previously been principal secretary to Premier Howard Pawley, in the summer of 1988. They later had a daughter, Emily Doer.

=== Meech Lake Accord ===
The dominant political issue in Manitoba between 1988 and 1990 was the Meech Lake Accord, which recognized Quebec as a "distinct society" in Canada and devolved some powers from the federal government to the provinces. The accord required approval from all ten provincial legislatures to become law. The provincial Liberals initially opposed the accord, which meant that Doer's support was necessary for its passage. In November 1988, Doer indicated that his party would not support the accord unless certain amendments were introduced. He was later appointed to a provincial panel that held a series of public meetings, and recommended significant changes to the deal. The Filmon government also expressed skepticism about the accord, and announced that it too would seek amendments from the federal government.

All three Manitoba party leaders agreed to a federally brokered compromise in June 1990, shortly before the accord's official deadline. The accord nonetheless failed to pass in the Manitoba legislature because of a procedural motion from Elijah Harper, a Cree member of the NDP caucus who argued that it did not give fair representation to Indigenous Canadians. Doer described Harper's decision as "a fundamental issue of conscience", and blamed Prime Minister Brian Mulroney for delaying negotiations until the deadline had almost expired. One year later, he indicated that he felt "betrayed" by federal negotiators, and described the entire Meech Lake process as "dishonest from start to finish".

=== 1990 election ===
In the aftermath of the accord's defeat, Filmon called a provincial election for 11 September 1990. Doer promised a ten-year freeze on personal income taxes, and argued that the Progressive Conservatives would pursue a hidden right-wing agenda if they won a majority government. He also promised legislation that would make it more difficult for companies based in Manitoba to close down.

An early poll showed the NDP in third place with 18% support, well behind the governing Progressive Conservatives and also behind the Liberals. The Liberal campaign faltered, however, and the New Democrats were able to make strong gains in the election's final days, partly buoyed by the unexpected victory of Bob Rae's New Democrats in the neighbouring province of Ontario. The Progressive Conservatives won a narrow majority with 30 seats, while the New Democrats won 20 and the Liberals seven. Doer succeeded Carstairs as Leader of the Opposition in the legislature.

== Leader of the Opposition ==
=== First term, 1990–95 ===
Doer criticized the Filmon government's cutbacks to health and education, and drew attention to the province's rising unemployment and child poverty rates in the early 1990s. Opposing Filmon's austerity measures, he argued it was inappropriate for the government to cut jobs at a time of high unemployment. In 1993, he opposed the government's decision to end funding for groups such as the Foster Family Association, the Assembly of Manitoba Chiefs, the Manitoba Anti-Poverty Organization and the Manitoba Environmental Council.

Doer announced in late 1992 that his caucus would support the Charlottetown Accord, a comprehensive package on constitutional reform that was introduced by the federal government after the failure of Meech Lake. The Accord was defeated in a national referendum.

Doer released an election platform in November 1994, highlighted by a ten-point preventive health-care program for children and a six-point Manitoba Works plan to reduce unemployment.

=== 1995 election ===
Doer focused on health issues in the 1995 provincial election. He promised that he would replace walk-in clinics with neighbourhood health organizations, to be staffed with salaried doctors, nurses, midwives and social workers. He pledged to negotiate with pharmaceutical companies to reduce prescription drug costs, and to review some of the hundreds of drugs that had been delisted in recent years. He also promised to create a new group of health providers called nurse practitioners, to carry out some doctors' responsibilities. On economic issues, Doer promised a balanced budget with no personal or sales tax increases over four years and indicated that he would cut nearly $119 million from government programs to fund health, education, and job creation.

An early poll from the Angus Reid firm showed the Progressive Conservatives with 37% support, the Liberals with 35%, and the NDP with 21%. The Liberal campaign faltered once again, however, and a poll released only days before the election showed the NDP had again surpassed the Liberals for second place. The Progressive Conservatives were re-elected with 31 seats, the NDP increased their total to 23, and the Liberals fell to only three. By the time of the election, the Ontario NDP was deeply unpopular, and Filmon's Tories capitalized on fears that Doer would govern in a similar manner to Rae if elected.

In the closing days of the campaign, Doer asked the province's chief electoral officer to investigate reports that three independent candidates from an unregistered party known as Native Voice had received assistance from a Progressive Conservative campaign official. Some believed these candidates would split the progressive-left vote in their ridings, and give the Progressive Conservatives a greater chance of winning. Little was done at the time, but the story emerged as a prominent provincial scandal following an exposé from the Canadian Broadcasting Corporation in June 1998. Doer called for an inquiry, which the Filmon government granted; the presiding officer determined that at least one of the candidates had been illegally induced to run to by local agents of the Progressive Conservative Party.

=== Second term, 1995–99 ===
Despite an improving economy, the Filmon government's 1996 budget introduced further cuts to social assistance, health care, and post-secondary and public school education. Doer argued that the cuts were ideological in nature, and not based on financial necessity. The government also introduced legislation permitting unionized workers to shield their dues from being donated to political parties. Doer suggested that corporate shareholders should also be allowed to opt out of party donations.

Doer opposed the Filmon government's decision to privatize the Manitoba Telephone System in 1996, arguing that it would cause Manitobans to lose control over a vital part of their economy. He called for a referendum, which Filmon rejected. Doer nonetheless accepted the finality of the sale, telling party delegates in 1999 that buying back the service would be too expensive and carry too many risks.

Doer also opposed the Filmon government's proposal to water-down the single-desk marketing powers of the Canadian Wheat Board. He argued there could be no "middle-of-the-road" position on the Wheat Board, adding that continued single-desk marketing would be "in the economic interests of producers and the economic interests of Winnipeg".

Some New Democrats expressed discontent with Doer's leadership in late 1997. Most notably, a group led by policy committee chairman Victor Olson issued a statement on party renewal that was generally interpreted as a challenge to his leadership. This came to nothing, but there was general agreement among party members that Doer would need to win the next election to continue as party leader.

=== 1999 election ===
In the buildup to the 1999 provincial election, Doer unveiled a platform that called for balanced budgets, debt repayment and a freeze on taxes. He again emphasized health care as a priority, and said that his government would stop the practice of using public monies for politically motivated polls and advertisements. He also expressed concern that the Progressive Conservatives could privatize Manitoba Hydro and criticized a provincial workfare initiative as giving too much discretionary power to government overseers.

The NDP voted to support the Filmon government's 1999 budget, citing the premier's decision to increase health spending with money from a provincial "rainy day fund". Doer added that, if elected, his party would replace Filmon's budgeted income tax cut with a property tax cut.

The NDP entered the 1999 election in a much stronger position than in the three previous campaigns. A poll taken three years earlier had shown the NDP leading the Progressive Conservatives for the first time since the Pawley administration. The Tories regained their lead by 1998, but fallout from the vote-splitting scandal gave the NDP an 8% lead in a Probe/Free Press poll issued in March 1999. In this period, many began to regard the NDP as a possible government-in-waiting. Later polls showed the gap between the parties narrowing to a virtual tie.

Doer pledged $13 million to shorten health-care waiting times in the 1999 campaign, and promised if he was elected he would end hallway in six months. He also pledged an additional $2 million to hire more nurses and provide incentives for rural doctors. In education, he promised to cut college and university tuition fees by 10% and to invest $24 million to the province's three community colleges. On election reform, he promised to ban campaign donations from corporations and unions. Doer also criticized the Filmon government's handling of a contract with Urban Shared Services Corp., which attempted to save the province money by reheating food for hospitals and seniors' homes at a centralized location. The project went well over-budget, and the food was often criticized as inedible.

A poll released a week before the election showed the NDP and Progressive Conservatives tied with 42% support, and the election was considered too close to call until the actual day of voting. The NDP ultimately won 32 seats, against 24 for the Progressive Conservatives and only one for the Liberals, whose new leader Jon Gerrard became their only MLA. A collapse of the Liberal vote worked to the NDP's advantage.

== Premier ==
More than eleven years after declining the option, Doer was sworn in as Premier of Manitoba on 5 October 1999. He also took the position of Minister of Federal/Provincial Relations.

=== Re-election campaigns ===
After governing for just under four years, Doer called a new provincial election for June 2003. He brought forward a five point re-election plan highlighted by promises to reduce property and income taxes, hire more nurses and doctors and make reductions in medical waiting lists, take a cautious approach to managing the economy, and improve the province's education and law enforcement systems. Many journalists noted similarities to the NDP's 1999 platform. The NDP held a massive lead in the polls throughout the campaign, and most observers agreed that its re-election was a foregone conclusion. Even the Winnipeg Free Press, not traditionally supportive of the NDP, urged voters to re-elect Doer's government. The NDP won an increased majority with 49.47% support and 35 of 57 seats, and made inroads into traditionally Progressive Conservative areas of south Winnipeg.

Four years later, Doer called an election for May 2007. The NDP campaign focused on Doer's personal popularity and his government's record in office. The party released a seven-point re-election plan, focused on health care, the environment, education, tax cuts, public safety, money for highways, and keeping Manitoba Hydro as a public institution. Doer promised to hire 700 nurses and nurse practitioners, 100 new police officers, 20 new crown prosecutors, and 20 new workplace safety inspectors. He also promised to improve Manitoba's record on vehicle emissions, provide tax credits for caregivers, and phase out the provincial small business tax over three years. The NDP was again re-elected with an increased majority, this time taking 36 of 57 seats.

=== Prominent cabinet members ===
Prominent members of Doer's first cabinet included Greg Selinger in Finance, Gord Mackintosh in Justice, David Chomiak in Health and Rosann Wowchuk in Agriculture. Tim Sale replaced Chomiak at Health in October 2004, and was in turn succeeded by Theresa Oswald in 2006. Chomiak replaced Mackintosh at Justice in 2006. Selinger remained as Finance Minister until 2009, when he succeeded Doer as premier. Wowchuk remains in Agriculture.

Jean Friesen served as Doer's deputy premier in his first term. She retired in 2003, and Doer chose Rosann Wowchuk as her replacement.

=== Financial policy ===
The Doer government has introduced an uninterrupted succession of balanced budgets since its first election in 1999. These budgets have generally been cautious, and have sought to balance tax concerns with spending increases. Doer's first budget, delivered in 2000, removed 15,000 low-income Manitobans from the tax rolls and introduced $150 million in tax breaks over three years while projecting a $10 million surplus. His 2003 budget, the last of his first term, reduced provincial taxes by $82.7 million and increased spending by about 5%, mostly in health and education.

Despite a series of economic setbacks, the government was able to post a balanced budget in 2004 through increased taxes and drug premiums as well as civil service reduction through attrition. Tobacco and liquor taxes were increased and the provincial sales tax expanded to cover more services, although Doer rejected a panel recommendation to increase the sales tax by 1%.

The government was able introduce a more expansive budget in 2005 after an infusion of federal revenues, reducing personal and property taxes, increasing spending by 3.5%, and putting $314 million into a "rainy day" fund. Doer's 2006 and 2007 budgets introduced further tax cuts, and the 2007 budget offered increased education spending and a new child benefit to assist low-income families.

At the Manitoba NDP's March 2009 convention, Doer announced that Manitoba would continue its commitment to education, training and research despite a global economic downturn and a slowing economy. He argued that the province was still recovering from the Filmon government's spending cuts during the economic downtown of the 1990s, and that his policies would allow Manitoba to emerge from the recession in a strong, competitive position. His government introduced a balanced budget with economic stimulus programs a few weeks later, even as the global recession forced other provincial governments across Canada into deficit.

Doer encouraged the Bank of Canada to lower its rates in late 2003, saying that the rising strength of the Canadian dollar in relation to the United States dollar was causing increased unemployment. He later criticized Bank Governor David Dodge for doing nothing to save Canadian jobs and profits. In early 2008, he called for a national strategy to offset the disruptions caused by Canada's soaring dollar.

In 2004, provincial Auditor General Jon Singleton argued that Manitoba was actually running a deficit due to costs associated with crown corporations, utilities and arm's-length agencies that were not officially counted in the budget. He recommended that Manitoba adopt a system of Generally Accepted Accounting Principles (GAAP). Greg Selinger, Doer's Finance Minister, noted that the existing rules were set in place by the Filmon government, and indicated that the NDP had included a summary financial statement to its budget including many of the costs Singleton identified. The Doer government nevertheless announced in 2005 that it would adopt GAAP.

For the first seven years of his administration, Doer was assisted on financial matters by Eugene Kostyra, a cabinet minister from the Pawley government. Kostyra resigned from his position as secretary of Manitoba's Community and Economic Development Committee in late 2006, and Angela Mathieson was appointed as his replacement.

=== Health ===
Doer has frequently argued in favour of Canada's public health system. He criticized Alberta's plan to introduce more private health provisions in 2002, and defended the public system as efficient and less expensive. In the same year, he endorsed Roy Romanow's assessment that the federal government must play a stronger role in health care to prevent more encroachments by the private system. At a presentation before the Romanow Commission in 2002, Doer called for the federal government to double its health care commitment. Two years later, he played a significant role in negotiations that saw the federal government contribute $18 billion in new funding to the provinces over six years.

The Doer government's first budget included a $135 million increase in health spending, taking total provincial spending to $2.43 billion. In October 2002, the government announced a long-anticipated $100 million expansion to the Health Sciences Centre in Winnipeg, with new operating rooms and emergency departments. The government was unable to end "hallway medicine" in the six-month period it had promised during the 1999 election, and faced the problem of nursing vacancies in the early 2000s. Nevertheless, most observers agreed that the provincial situation improved significantly between 1999 and 2003. Health spending continued to increase during Doer's second term; a report in December 2004 indicated that Manitoba's per capita health spending was the highest in Canada for the seventh continuous year.

Doer emerged as a defender of Manitoba's burgeoning internet pharmaceutical industry in the mid-2000s. This industry was very popular among American clients, but nonetheless provoked opposition within both countries. In 2004, Doer accused federal Health Minister Ujjal Dosanjh of capitulating to American interests by agreeing to increased restrictions on the industry. He later argued that the Canadian government could protect its national drug supply and maintain Manitoba's pharmaceutical sector simply by banning bulk exports.

Doer's government introduced a landmark anti-smoking bill in 2004, banning smoking in all indoor public places and workplaces across the province. Supported by all parties, the legislation was the first of its kind in Canada. It did not cover Manitobans working in federal government buildings or living on First Nations territory, as these were not under provincial jurisdiction.

Doer welcomed Prime Minister Paul Martin's decision to name Winnipeg as the site of Canada's new public health agency in 2004.

=== Social policy ===
The Doer government passed a bill granting full adoption rights to gay and lesbian couples in 2002. The NDP and Liberals supported the bill, while the Progressive Conservatives voted against it.

In 2004, the federal government announced that it would introduce legislation to permit the legalization of same-sex marriage in Canada. Federal Justice Minister Irwin Cotler initially indicated that civic officials would be allowed to opt out of performing same-sex marriages if the practice offended their beliefs. Doer criticized this, arguing that provincial employees should not be permitted to discriminate. Doer initially declined to express his personal views on the subject, but announced in late 2004 that he supported same-sex marriage as a human right.

In April 2005, Doer signed a $176 million deal with the federal government of Paul Martin to expand the provincial day-care sector. The project was canceled in 2006 by the new Conservative government of Stephen Harper, over Doer's objections.

Unlike some within the NDP, Doer is personally opposed to the decriminalization of marijuana, which he has said could result in economic difficulties with the United States.

As premier, Doer encouraged several Manitoba crown corporations to donate money to the Canadian Museum for Human Rights in Winnipeg; Manitoba Public Insurance, Manitoba Hydro, Manitoba Lotteries Corporation and the Manitoba Liquor Control Commission subsequently made donations of one million dollars each. Opposition leader Hugh McFadyen and some journalists questioned Doer's involvement in the matter, arguing that he was effectively directing the corporations to make these donations.

=== Education ===
Doer's government cut university tuition by 10% during its first term, and later provided universities with a property tax exemption. It also amalgamated several school divisions prior to the 2002 municipal elections, and began to phase out education property taxes in the same period.

In 2006, the Doer government introduced a proposal for Manitoba university graduates to receive a tuition rebate of up to 60% if they chose to stay and work in the province after graduation.

A 2008 Winnipeg Free Press article indicated that Manitoba and Alberta were investing more money in public education per student than all other provinces of Canada. Teachers' wages in Manitoba were also noted to be healthy in relation to the average national wage.

=== Agriculture ===
Shortly after being sworn in as premier, Doer led an all-party delegation to Ottawa to seek a $1.3 billion financial bailout for western farmers to help mitigate an economic downturn in the sector. He was joined by Saskatchewan premier Roy Romanow, Progressive Conservative MLA Larry Maguire, and Manitoba Liberal leader Jon Gerrard. The federal government introduced $170 million in funding shortly thereafter, a figure that Doer and Romanow described as "heartless". In February 2000, Romanow and Doer stood with Chrétien to announce their support for a compromise bailout of $400 million.

Shortly after his re-election in 2003, Doer criticized the federal government for failing to respond to an agriculture crisis caused by the discovery of bovine spongiform encephalopathy in a Canadian cow and the subsequent closure of the American border to beef products produced in Canada. The federal and provincial governments subsequently agreed on a $50 million bailout to the industry. The border was reopened to live cattle in December 2004.

Doer strongly supports the Canadian Wheat Board's policy of single-desk marketing, and has opposed efforts by some on the political right to weaken its status. In late 2006, Doer accused federal Agriculture Minister Chuck Strahl of interfering in the Wheat Board's elections.

The Doer government has rejected a return to single-desk hog marketing, which was eliminated during the years of the Filmon government. During its second term, the government supported plans to establish an OlyWest hog processing plant in northeast Winnipeg. This measure was extremely controversial among party members, and area NDP MLAs Daryl Reid and Bidhu Jha indicated that they opposed the measure. In response to criticism, Doer withdrew his support for OlyWest in 2007. The Doer government introduced a temporary ban on new hog farms throughout most of the province in March 2008, following the release of a provincial environmental report. Around the same time, Doer announced new funding for waste-water treatment plants that would allow two existing hog-processing plants to expand their operations.

Doer is a vocal opponent of the American Country of Origin Labelling initiative, which would require American producers to separate meat from hogs slaughtered in Canada and increase packing and labelling cost.

=== Justice ===
Doer opposed the Chrétien government's decision to implement a federal gun registry, and his government joined with other provinces to raise a constitutional challenge against the law in 2000.

Doer called for the federal government to strengthen its laws against child pornography in 2002, after the Supreme Court of British Columbia ruled that John Robin Sharpe's fictional writings involving children met the legal definition of "artistic merit". Doer was quoted as saying, "We believe that the rights of children should be superior rights in our country to the rights of perverts". The following year, the Manitoba government unveiled a website that included photographs and profiles of high-risk sex offenders.

Also in 2002, Doer argued that persons who kill police officers should spend the rest of their natural lives in jail, without access to Canada's so-called "Faint Hope Clause" for early release. Three years later, he argued that the provisions of the federal Youth Criminal Justice Act were too lenient. In 2007, Doer led an all-party task force to Ottawa to seek greater federal penalties for gang-related crime, youth offences and car theft.

In 2004, the Doer government increased funding for the hiring of police officers and Crown prosecutors. Following increased urban violence in 2005, the province announced funding for 54 more officers. The government also launched an initiative to hire seven recreational directors for inner-city Winnipeg neighbourhoods in 2008, to provide sports opportunities for youth as an alternative to crime.

Doer announced the creation of an all-party task force on security following the attacks of 11 September 2001. The following month, he announced that he would work with the Governors of Minnesota and North Dakota for a coordinated security strategy.

Doer's government tabled legislation in 2009 to provide civilian oversight of police officers in Manitoba, following an inquiry into the death of Crystal Taman. She was killed when her car, stopped for a red light, was struck by off-duty Winnipeg Police constable Derek Harvey-Zink's pickup truck. The Taman Inquiry's report strongly criticized the resulting police investigation into the collision, as well as the Doer Government's choice of special prosecutor, Marty Minuk.

=== Environment ===
Doer has been a strong and consistent supporter of the Kyoto Accord on climate change. In February 2004, his government signed an agreement with the Chicago Climate Exchange pledging Manitoba to create a trust fund to pay for projects that reduce greenhouse gas emissions. In 2007, he announced that Manitoba would pursue a plan with other provinces and states to push greenhouse gas emissions to 15% below 2005 levels by 2020. The next year, Doer legislated his province's commitment to meet its targets under the Kyoto Protocol by 2012.

Doer announced that Manitoba would increase ethanol production in 2002, and held consultations on a plan requiring Manitoba drivers to use ethanol-blended gasoline. In October 2002, the government instructed its provincial fleet drivers to switch to ethanol fuels. These plans stalled due to limited production, but were revived when a new facility was constructed in late 2005.

In March 2004, the government introduced enabling legislation on water protection, allowing for the introduction of specific regulations on water protection zones, water quality standards, and related matters.

Doer signed the Midwestern Regional Greenhouse Gas Reduction Accord with seven American governors in November 2007. The following month, he announced that Manitoba would introduce vehicle emission standards similar to those in California. In late January 2008, he agreed to a blueprint proposal with the premiers of British Columbia, Ontario and Quebec for a market-based trading system to cut greenhouse gas emissions. He later became an enthusiastic supporter of North American cap and trade programs to reduce energy emissions, while at the same time criticizing the idea of a carbon tax.

Doer introduced plans to eliminate coal-burning factories in his 2008 budget. The budget also included a new program for water conservation, and a $7 million fund directed toward climate change issues. He also called for an independent review of the Manitoba Clean Environment Commission in 2008, arguing that the renewal process for hydroelectric projects was too long.

In November 2008, Doer announced that his government would ban new logging in provincial parks and phase out existing projects. He also announced a ban on plastic shopping bags, and on the use of cellphones while driving. Parents were also forbidden to smoke when children were in the car. The opposition Progressive Conservatives indicated that it would support all of these initiatives.

In late 2005, the American magazine Business Week listed Doer as one of the top twenty international leaders fighting climate change.

=== Aboriginal issues ===
In November 1999, Doer appointed a two-person panel to advise his government on implementing the findings of the Aboriginal Justice Inquiry, which had been published eight years earlier. In April 2000, Manitoba took steps to provide indigenous Manitobans with their own child and family-service agencies. Doer convened a provincial summit on aboriginal commerce in November 2004. He indicated that the summit was intended to showcase successful businesses, and to forge greater links between the aboriginal and non-aboriginal communities.

Doer is a strong supporter of the Kelowna Accord signed in late 2005 by the federal government of Paul Martin, provincial premiers and aboriginal leaders. After the Martin government was defeated in the 2006 federal election and replaced by the government of Stephen Harper, Doer criticized Harper's failure to implement the accord.

In late 2008, the Doer government introduced legislation to give sixteen bands on the east shore of Lake Winnipeg greater authority over the management of their traditional lands. The bill requires that plans for development be approved by both the province and the band's chief, and extends the range of influence well beyond the area's small reserves. Some chiefs in the affected area later objected to the bill on procedural grounds, arguing that they were not properly consulted.

Following consultations with the Assembly of Manitoba Chiefs in 1999, the Doer government established a selection committee to oversee proposals for setting up casinos in Manitoba first nations. The process subsequently became stalled, and only one of the casinos was up and running by 2003. The government subsequently appointed a panel to review the situation and recommend a change in strategy; the panel argued that the province should consider creating one large casino, instead of several small on-reserve casinos. A second casino was opened in 2005, while the larger issue remained unresolved as of 2007.

=== Energy ===
Doer has often referred to hydroelectric power as playing a major role in Manitoba's long-term economic strategy, and has advocated a national east-west power grid to export Manitoba's plentiful hydroelectric power to Ontario and other provinces in Western Canada.

Doer announced Manitoba's first wind farm project in November 2004, near the community of St. Leon. This was a private-public partnership arranged between Manitoba Hydro and AirSource Power Fund. It was officially started in April 2005.

In September 2007, Manitoba Hydro indicated that it would construct a new transmission line to connect north and south Manitoba on the west side of Lake Winnipeg. Hydro's initial plan had been to construct the line on the east side, but Doer's government rejected this approach, arguing that it would damage pristine boreal forest territories. The local aboriginal community is divided on the issue, with some leaders supporting the government's conservation approach and others arguing that east side construction would help combat poverty in the area. The Progressive Conservative Party has strongly criticized Doer's decision. In April 2008, Manitoba Hydro announced a $2 billion agreement to sell surplus energy to Wisconsin once the construction is complete.

Doer asked Manitoba Hydro and the Manitoba Public Utilities Board to provide an analysis of natural gas prices in July 2008, with the intent of limiting price increases during the winter. He also indicated that his government would intervene to protect consumers from high prices. Finance Minister Greg Selinger later indicated that the government would provide some relief for consumers, but would not use Manitoba Hydro's profits to offset rate increases.

=== Labour issues ===
The Doer government introduced a number of labour reforms early in its first mandate, making it easier for unions to obtain certification and giving employees increased powers to move disputes to binding arbitration. Business leaders opposed the changes, though Doer argued that the bill was far less contentious than opponents made it out to be. In 2004, Doer rejected a call by party members to introduce legislation that would ban replacement workers in labour disputes.

Doer's government increased Manitoba's minimum wage from $6.00 to $6.25 in November 2000, and brought in subsequent increases of 25 cents on an annual basis. By April 2005, the minimum wage had been increased to $7.25. Some argued that this was still short of a living wage. The minimum wage was increased to $8.50 in 2008. In 2005, the Doer government introduced a bill to expand provincial workers' compensation coverage.

The Doer government announced in late 2007 that temporary foreign workers and modeling agencies would be included under the Employment Standards Act, to prevent worker exploitation.

=== Monsanto ===
In 1999, the Manitoba government under NDP leadership, began its ongoing relationship with Monsanto, accepting a 12.5 million dollar agreement to bring in its first development centre. In 2005, Gary Doer announced a deal to allow Monsanto to build their 42,000 square foot Canadian head office in Manitoba.

Doer's government introduced a biotechnology training strategy in October 2002, to address a skilled-worker shortage in the industry. In early 2003, Doer signed a $160 million deal with the federal government for expansion work on the Red River Floodway. The floodway expansion was described as the largest infrastructure project in Manitoba history, and was started in late 2005.

Doer took part in discussions in 2007-08 with media mogul David Asper and officials from other levels of government, regarding the location of a new stadium for the Winnipeg Blue Bombers football team. He was skeptical about Asper's initial plan for a stadium in the Polo Park region of Winnipeg, and was more supportive of an abortive plan to construct the stadium in the economically depressed area of Point Douglas. Asper eventually chose site in Fort Garry, next to the University of Manitoba. The deal was finalized in early 2009, with the province providing $20 million in funding; provincial officials believe that all but $1 million will be recovered before the stadium opens in 2011.

In September 2008, Doer and Winnipeg Mayor Sam Katz announced $138 million for a rapid transit plan that will eventually link downtown Winnipeg with the University of Manitoba. In the same month, Doer designated a piece of land in northwest Winnipeg as the site of a future inland port. The area was given the name CentrePort Canada, and its first directors were chosen in December 2008.

Doer announced in February 2009 that his government would spend $1 million on special training for northern Manitoba workers, following a global economic downtown that adversely affected the province's forestry and mining sectors. Two months later, he joined with the federal government to announce a $40 million investment in a cold weather aerospace engine testing and research facility in Thompson. In early May 2009, the federal and provincial governments announced $116 million for infrastructure renewal in rural and northern communities.

=== Crocus Investment Fund ===
In early 2005, the labour-managed Crocus Investment Fund stopped trading and entered into financial protection. The Doer government was subsequently accused of having ignored signs of trouble at the fund, and of failing to protect the interests of investors. The opposition Progressive Conservatives argued that the government had neglected warnings of financial impropriety, in part because of ideological links between the New Democratic Party and the labour movement. Doer rejected this charge, observing that the fund had been established by the Filmon government in conjunction with labour leaders. He also rejected calls from the opposition for a formal inquiry, and insisted that the province did nothing wrong in the matter.

=== Federal-provincial relations ===
Doer supported the Chrétien government's Clarity Act legislation, which required that any future negotiations on provincial secession be preceded by a referendum with a clearly defined question. The act was opposed by Quebec nationalists, who regarded it as an infringement on their national sovereignty. In 2004, Doer criticized new Prime Minister Paul Martin for seeming to undermine the principles of the bill. He also criticized Martin's promise to remove the "Notwithstanding Clause" from the Constitution of Canada in the 2006 federal election. Doer later criticized Martin's successor, Stephen Harper, for recognizing the Québécois as a nation within Canada in late 2006. He was quoted as saying, "[t]o me, Canada is one nation, one country. I understand Quebec is unique in terms of language, culture and law, but Canada is one country."

Notwithstanding this and other criticisms, a May 2008 article in The Globe and Mail newspaper described Doer as one of the few premiers to have a good working relationship with Conservative Prime Minister Stephen Harper. Manitoba signed on to the federal government's Building Canada Fund in late 2008, receiving about $500 million in new infrastructure monies. Following a global economic downturn in late 2008, Doer called on the federal government to invest in job creation and infrastructure funding. Prime Minister Harper later said that his government would spend more on roads, bridges and other public works.

According to journalist Chantal Hébert, Doer played a vital role in convincing other provincial leaders to accept Quebec premier Jean Charest's plan to create the Council of the Federation in 2003. In 2008-09, Charest and Doer helped broker an agreement among the premiers to provide for greater labour mobility within Canada.

In early 2007, Doer said that Manitoba would not enter a free trade deal signed between Alberta and British Columbia. He instead called for a national trade accord. Doer met with other western Canadian premiers in June 2009 to introduce a plan for the collective purchase of prescription drugs. The premiers indicated that the plan could save taxpayers millions of dollars.

In late 2008, the federal Liberal and New Democratic parties announced plans to defeat the Conservatives on a motion of no confidence and create a coalition government. The plan was ultimately unsuccessful, and the Conservatives remained in power. Doer did not take a position on the coalition, and instead called for all parties in the House of Commons of Canada to work in a cooperative manner.

=== International relations ===
Since his first election in 1999, Doer has been a leading opponent of a water diversion in Devils Lake, North Dakota that many regard as posing a serious environmental threat to Manitoba. In 2005, the Canadian and American governments reached a non-binding compromise deal on the project that committed both sides to design an advanced filter to prevent environmental disruption. Doer initially described this agreement as a significant improvement over prior arrangements, but later criticized the North Dakota government for starting the water diversion before the deal was finalized. In May 2009, Doer said that Manitoba would invest more than $10 million in drainage improvements if North Dakota would agree to construct a permanent filter on its Devils Lake output. North Dakota Governor John Hoeven rejected the deal in the same month, arguing that the issues were separate.

Doer has led several international trade delegations from Manitoba, including visits to Russia, Germany, Israel, India, China and The Philippines. He also made an historic visit to Iceland in August 2001; Manitoba has a large Icelandic population, and Doer was the first Manitoba premier to make an official visit to the country. Halldór Ásgrímsson, the Prime Minister of Iceland, made a follow-up visit to Manitoba in July 2005. In May 2008, Ukrainian President Viktor Yushchenko made an official visit to Manitoba and addressed the provincial legislature.

Doer signed an agreement with the American state of Georgia in 2004, for increased co-operation between the Centers for Disease Control and Prevention in Atlanta and the National Virology Lab in Winnipeg. In the same year, he signed a memorandum of understanding with Minnesota Governor Tim Pawlenty to create a "biomedical corridor" for the promotion of research, capital investment and technology development. In early 2005, Doer and New Brunswick premier Bernard Lord traveled on a trade mission to Texas in what was described as an effort to improve relations between Canada and the United States. Later in the year, Doer and Jean Charest traveled on a trade mission to Mexico. In 2006, he appeared at a prominent climate change event with California Governor Arnold Schwarzenegger. In June 2009, Doer took part in discussions to create a "Western Energy Corridor" to allow an easier flow of both renewable energy and fossil fuels among western American states and Canadian provinces.

Doer has supported Canada's military mission in Afghanistan, despite skepticism about the purpose of the mission from the federal NDP. He called for Canada to ban donations to Hezbollah's charity wing in 2002, and endorsed Jean Chrétien government's decision to remain out of the U.S.-led invasion of Iraq in 2003.

In 2005, Doer spoke against the American government's plans to require passports at Canada–US border crossings. He argued that the new expense of travel would create a "financial Berlin Wall" for some families, and instead proposed a security protocol centred around drivers' licenses. In 2007, North Dakota Governor John Hoeven announced that he was working with Doer to find an alternative approach.

In 2008, Doer argued that Canada should "aggressively" defend the North American Free Trade Agreement against criticism from American Democratic Party presidential candidates. He later spoke against the United States Congress's planned "Buy American" legislation during a business trip to Illinois and Texas.

Doer signed an agreement in Manila in February 2008, to permit an easier flow of immigration from The Philippines to Manitoba.

=== Legislative reform ===
Doer's government changed the rules of the legislature in 1999, to allow the Speaker of the Assembly to be elected by a secret ballot vote of all members. Speakers had previously been appointed by the premier.

The Doer government announced election spending reforms in June 2000, which were highlighted by a ban on political donations by private corporations and organized labour. This measure was opposed by the opposition Progressive Conservatives, and by the right-wing Canadian Taxpayers Federation. The reforms came into effect in 2001, and were extended to party leadership contests in June 2002. Further restrictions were added in 2006. In June 2009, Winnipeg Mayor Sam Katz spoke against Doer's plan to ban union and corporate donations from municipal elections.

The Doer government introduced legislation in April 2006 to prevent MLAs from crossing the floor from one party to another. Under the terms of this legislation, MLAs who choose to leave their political party are required to sit as independents until the next election, or to resign and seek re-election for another party.

Doer announced plans in early 2008 to create a lobbyist registry for Manitoba, as well as introducing fixed election dates, partial public campaign financing, and restrictions on partisan direct mail flyers sent out by MLAs at public expense. The plan for public campaign financing was later abandoned after public opposition.

In 2009, opposition politicians and some journalists pressured Doer to call a public inquiry into a controversy involving expense claims from the 1999 provincial election. Elections Manitoba had determined that some reimbursement claims filed by the Manitoba NDP were unwarranted; in late 2003, the party agreed to repay $76,000 in an out-of-court settlement. Critics have charged a lack of transparency in the process, and have questioned why Elections Manitoba did not lay charges. At least one Winnipeg journalist has compared the matter with an expenses scandal faced by the Conservative Party of Canada following the 2006 federal election. Doer has argued that the matter is settled, and that there is no need for an inquiry.

=== Popularity ===
Doer's government enjoyed an extended honeymoon with voters after the 1999 election. The NDP consistently led all other parties in public opinion polls from 1999 until 2005, often by wide margins. The party's popularity dipped in late 2005, damaged somewhat by questions resulting from the failure of the Crocus Investment Fund. Polls taken in December 2005 and March 2006 showed the NDP and Progressive Conservatives tied for support. In July 2006, the PCs pulled ahead of the NDP for the first time in seven years. The NDP nevertheless recovered to win a convincing majority in the 2007 election, and in July 2008 held a ten-point lead over the Progressive Conservatives in popular support. The PCs posted a surprise lead over the NDP in a December 2008 poll, although some local journalists questioned its accuracy. By April 2009, the NDP once again held a ten-point lead.

Doer was rated as Canada's most popular premier in polls taken in 2003, 2004, 2005 and 2006, scoring a 77% rating in March 2006. His approval rating was 81% in March 2008, making him the second most popular Canadian premier after Danny Williams of Newfoundland and Labrador.

=== Retirement ===
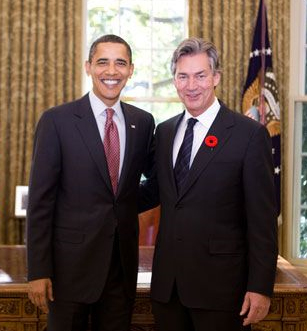
Doer with US President Barack Obama in 2009

On 27 August 2009, Doer announced he would not seek re-election in the 2011 election, and on 28 August 2009, he was nominated by Prime Minister Stephen Harper to succeed Michael Wilson as Canadian ambassador to the United States. He was formally sworn into that position on 19 October 2009, and on the same day Greg Selinger was sworn in as his replacement as Premier of Manitoba. Doer's former constituency assistant Matt Wiebe subsequently won the by-election to succeed Doer as MLA for Concordia on 2 March 2010.

== Federal politics ==
Doer supported a bid to draft former Manitoba premier Edward Schreyer as a candidate in the federal New Democratic Party's 1989 leadership contest. When Schreyer declined to run, Doer tried to convince Stephen Lewis and then Bob Rae to enter the contest, without success. He eventually supported Audrey McLaughlin, who was elected on the fourth ballot of the party's leadership convention.

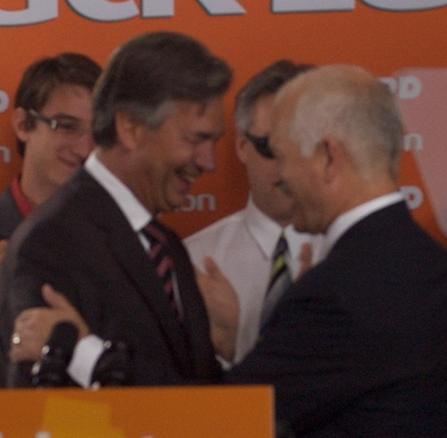
Doer with NDP leader Jack Layton during the 2008 federal election.

There was speculation that Doer would seek the federal NDP leadership in 1995, after McLaughlin announced her resignation. He declined, and instead gave his support to longtime friend Alexa McDonough, whom he nominated at the leadership convention. McDonough was chosen as party leader following the first ballot.

In 2001, Doer opposed the New Politics Initiative, a left-leaning faction within the party. In the 2003 leadership election, he supported the leadership campaign of Bill Blaikie, whose federal Winnipeg—Transcona riding overlapped with his own provincial division. Blaikie finished second against Jack Layton.

Doer has disagreed with the federal NDP on some issues. He defended CanWest Global's takeover of a part of Conrad Black's newspaper empire in 2000, even though the arrangement had been criticized by the federal party. He later called for Svend Robinson to be demoted as Foreign Affairs Critic in 2002, after Robinson announced his support for the Palestinians in their conflict with Israel (official NDP policy was that both sides should seek a peace agreement). Doer was quoted as saying, "Either he represents the party as a foreign affairs critic or he's removed as foreign affairs critic. And I believe he should be removed". He later expressed disappointment that Robinson was allowed to keep his critic's role, albeit with a ban against speaking on Middle East issues.

Doer published a ten-point proposal for the future of the federal NDP in June 2002, calling for a focus on health and education as well as fiscal balance, community safety and election finance reform.

Doer was considered a possible candidate for the 2012 leadership election, but declined to run.

== Ideology ==
Doer is at the centre of the New Democratic Party. He once described his political ideology as follows:

I don't believe in nationalizing everything in our society, as in socialist theory. Anybody who calls himself a socialist has to believe in nationalizing almost everything. I see myself as a social democrat—mixed economy, strong role of the public sector.

Doer endorsed Tony Blair's approach to leading the British Labour Party in 1997, and his own 1999 election platform was frequently compared with Blair's "Third Way" of social democracy. Doer has also been compared with former premier of Saskatchewan Roy Romanow, who also governed from the centre of the party. Former NDP MLA Cy Gonick wrote a critical essay about Doer in 2007, describing him as a "small-l liberal" without "a socialist bone in his body".

== Legacy ==
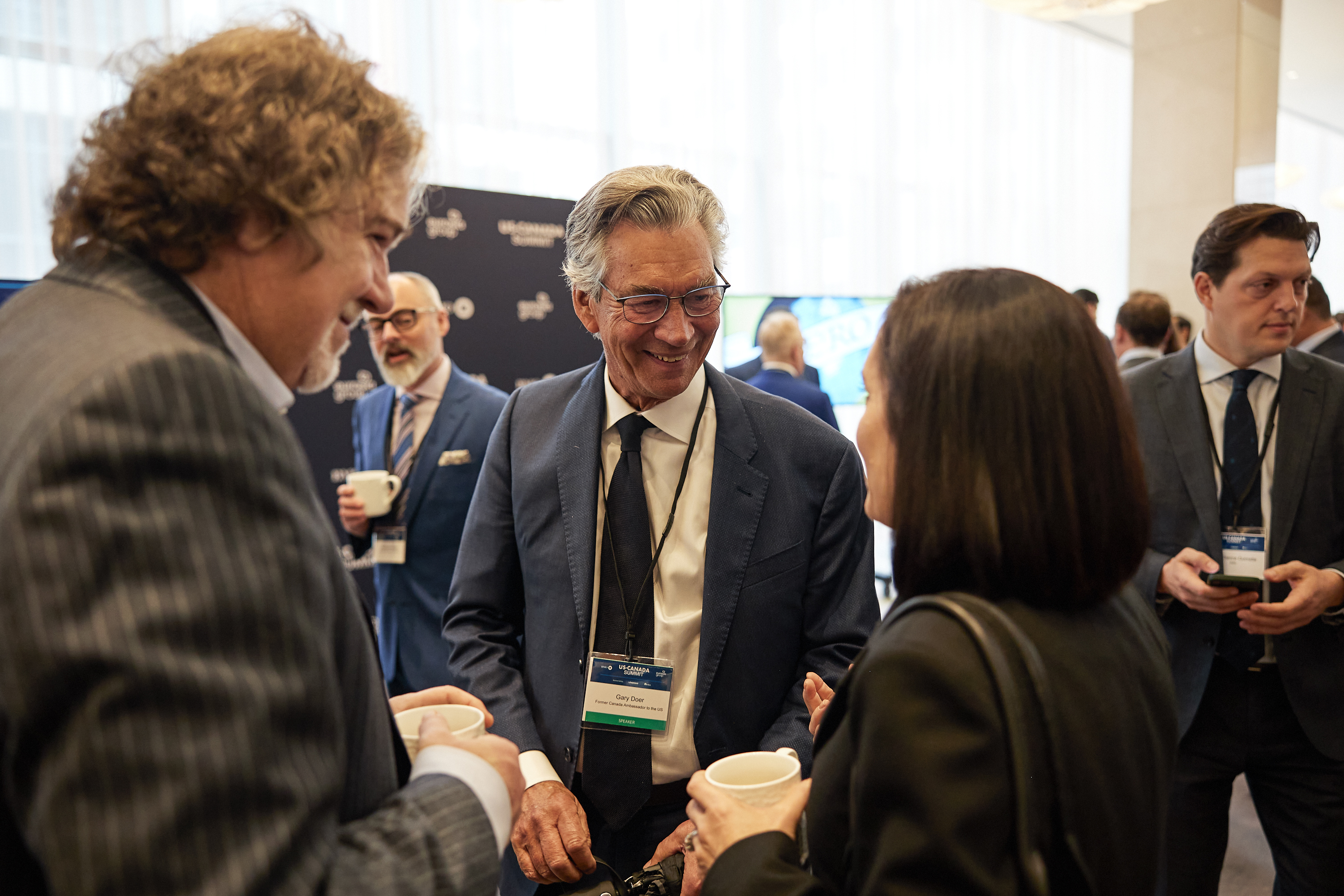
Doer at the 2023 US-Canada Summit in Toronto

Manitoba Wildlands director, Gaile Whelan Enns, said "He has no real policy legacy." Eric Reder, Manitoba campaign director for the non-profit Wilderness Committee, echoed that assessment. " "The entirety of his term was incremental—little decisions," Reder said. Those incremental decisions included raising the minimum wage from $6 to $9 an hour.

The Manitoba government's relationship with Monsanto lead to the documentary "Seeds of Change," which explored negative aspects of the relationship.

== Electoral record ==
2007 Manitoba general election: Concordia
Party	Candidate	Votes	%	±%	Expenditures
New Democratic	Gary Doer	3,862	69.05	-7.62	$14,144.95
Progressive Conservative	Ken Waddell	1,209	21.62	5.51	$15,745.09
Liberal	Leslie Worthington	336	6.01	-1.21	$340.30
Green	Andrew Basham	186	3.33	–	$199.88
Total valid votes		5,593	–	–	
Rejected		28	–		
Eligible voters / turnout		11,853	47.42	0.92	
Source(s) Source: Manitoba. Chief Electoral Officer (2007). Statement of Votes for the 39th Provincial General Election, May 22, 2007 (PDF) (Report). Winnipeg: Elections Manitoba.

2003 Manitoba general election: Concordia
Party	Candidate	Votes	%	±%	Expenditures
New Democratic	Gary Doer	4,450	76.67	6.59	$20,354.04
Progressive Conservative	Conor Lloyd	935	16.11	-7.26	$0.00
Liberal	Tanya Parks	419	7.22	1.75	$1,033.77
Total valid votes		5,804	–	–	
Rejected		38	–		
Eligible voters / turnout		12,564	46.50	-17.80	
Source(s) Source: Manitoba. Chief Electoral Officer (2003). Statement of Votes for the 38th Provincial General Election, June 3, 2003 (PDF) (Report). Winnipeg: Elections Manitoba.

1999 Manitoba general election: Concordia
Party	Candidate	Votes	%	±%	Expenditures
New Democratic	Gary Doer	5,691	70.09	6.51	$13,477.00
Progressive Conservative	Paul Murphy	1,898	23.37	-0.93	$21,285.31
Liberal	Chris Hlady	444	5.47	-5.28	$193.61
Green	Dave Nickarz	87	1.07	–	$25.00
Total valid votes		8,120	–	–	
Rejected		48	–		
Eligible voters / turnout		12,703	64.30	-2.52	
Source(s) Source: Manitoba. Chief Electoral Officer (1999). Statement of Votes for the 37th Provincial General Election, September 21, 1999 (PDF) (Report). Winnipeg: Elections Manitoba.

1995 Manitoba general election: Concordia
Party	Candidate	Votes	%	±%	Expenditures
New Democratic	Gary Doer	4,827	63.58	5.41	$17,879.00
Progressive Conservative	Paul Murphy	1,845	24.30	-0.26	$13,105.33
Liberal	Bret Dobbin	816	10.75	-2.68	$11,467.33
Libertarian	Guy Beaudry	104	1.37	-0.34	$477.96
Total valid votes		7,592	–	–	
Rejected		30	–		
Eligible voters / turnout		11,406	66.82	-1.56	
Source(s) Source: Manitoba. Chief Electoral Officer (1999). Statement of Votes for the 37th Provincial General Election, September 21, 1999 (PDF) (Report). Winnipeg: Elections Manitoba.

1990 Manitoba general election: Concordia
Party	Candidate	Votes	%	±%
New Democratic	Gary Doer	4,588	58.17	20.46
Progressive Conservative	Vic Hubiletz	1,937	24.56	-2.27
Liberal	Gunther Grosskamper	1,059	13.43	-16.60
Western Independence	Fred Cameron	168	2.13	0.97
Libertarian	Guy Beaudry	135	1.71	–
Total valid votes		7,887	–	–
Rejected		12	–	
Eligible voters / turnout		11,551	68.38	-8.05
Source(s) Source: Manitoba. Chief Electoral Officer (1999). Statement of Votes for the 37th Provincial General Election, September 21, 1999 (PDF) (Report). Winnipeg: Elections Manitoba.

1988 Manitoba general election: Concordia
Party	Candidate	Votes	%	±%
New Democratic	Gary Doer	3,702	37.71	-16.66
Liberal	Barbara Blomeley	2,948	30.03	19.11
Progressive Conservative	Victor Rubiletz	2,634	26.83	-5.42
Independent	Bill Seman	358	3.65	–
Western Independence	Fred Cameron	114	1.16	–
Progressive	Charles Henry	61	0.62	–
Total valid votes		9,817	–	–
Rejected		10	–	
Eligible voters / turnout		12,857	76.43	10.21
New Democratic hold		Swing		-17.89
Source(s) Source: Manitoba. Chief Electoral Officer (1999). Statement of Votes for the 37th Provincial General Election, September 21, 1999 (PDF) (Report). Winnipeg: Elections Manitoba.

1986 Manitoba general election: Concordia
Party	Candidate	Votes	%	±%
New Democratic	Gary Doer	4,525	54.37	-6.54
Progressive Conservative	Brent Aubertin	2,684	32.25	2.71
Liberal	Gail Stapon	909	10.92	7.39
Western Canada Concept	Fred Cameron	204	2.45	–
Total valid votes		8,322	–	–
Rejected		13	–	
Eligible voters / Turnout		12,587	66.22	–
New Democratic hold		Swing		-4.63
Source(s) Source: Manitoba. Chief Electoral Officer (1999). Statement of Votes for the 37th Provincial General Election, September 21, 1999 (PDF) (Report). Winnipeg: Elections Manitoba.

All electoral information is taken from Elections Manitoba. Expenditures refer to candidate election expenses.
