= Greg Selinger =

Premier of Manitoba from 2009 to 2016

Greg Selinger OM
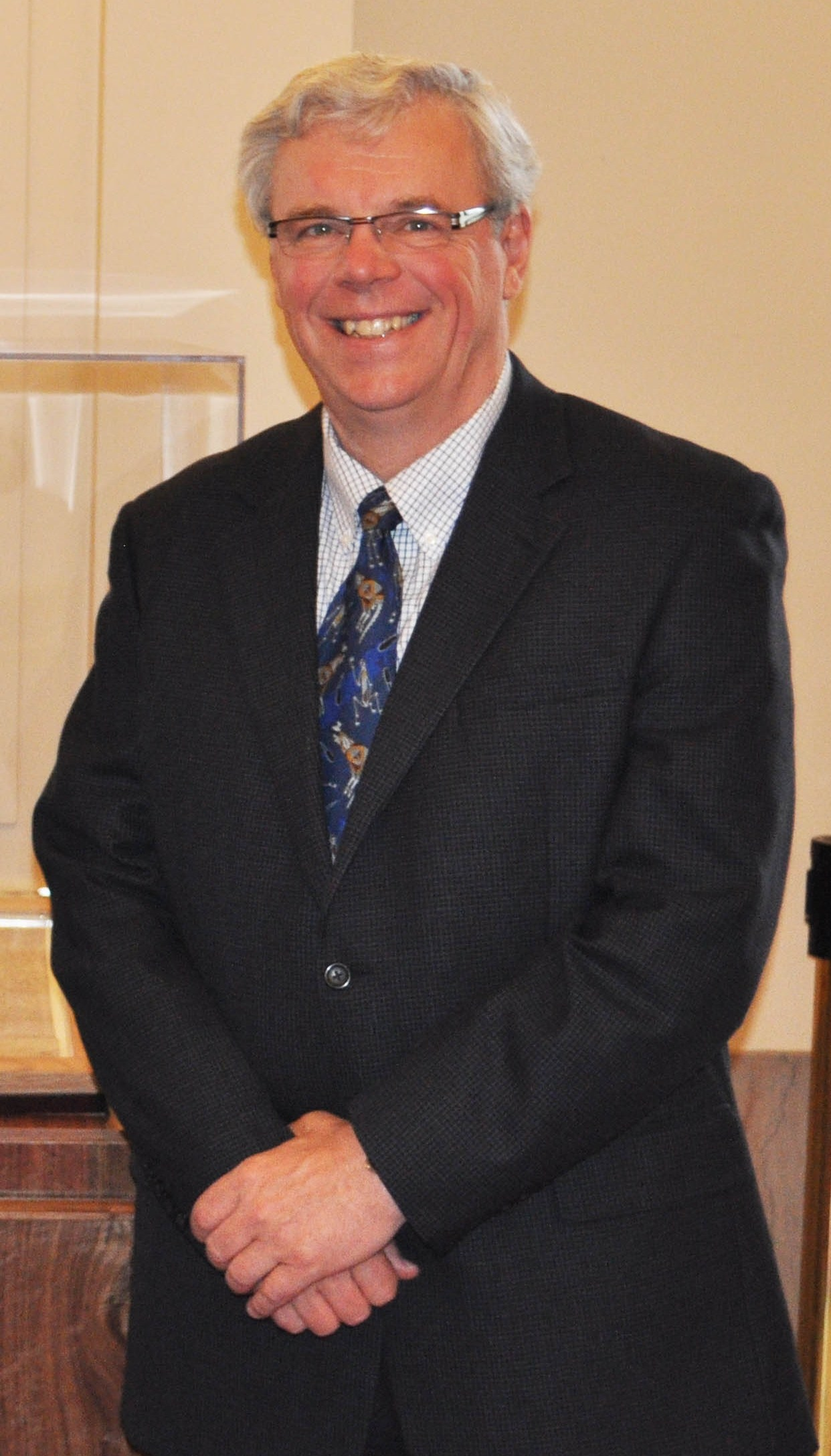
- Selinger in 2010

21st Premier of Manitoba
- In office October 19, 2009 – May 3, 2016
- Monarch: Elizabeth II
- Lieutenant Governor: Philip S. Lee; Janice Filmon
- Deputy: Rosann Wowchuk; Eric Robinson; Kerri Irvin-Ross
- Preceded by: Gary Doer
- Succeeded by: Brian Pallister

Leader of the Manitoba New Democratic Party
- In office October 17, 2009 – May 7, 2016
- Preceded by: Gary Doer
- Succeeded by: Flor Marcelino (Interim)

Manitoba Minister of Finance
- In office October 5, 1999 – September 8, 2009
- Premier: Gary Doer
- Preceded by: Harold Gilleshammer
- Succeeded by: Rosann Wowchuk

Member of the Legislative Assembly of Manitoba for St. Boniface
- In office September 21, 1999 – March 7, 2018
- Preceded by: Neil Gaudry
- Succeeded by: Dougald Lamont

Winnipeg City Councillor for St. Boniface
- In office October 25, 1989 – October 28, 1992
- Preceded by: Guy Savoie

Personal details
- Born: Gregory Francis Selinger; February 16, 1951 (age 75) Regina, Saskatchewan, Canada
- Party: New Democratic Party
- Spouse: Claudette Toupin
- Education: University of Manitoba (BSW); Queen's University (MPA); London School of Economics (PhD)
- Occupation: Academic
- Website: gregselinger.ca

Gregory Francis Selinger OM (born February 16, 1951) is a former Canadian politician who served as the 21st premier of Manitoba from 2009 until 2016, leading an NDP government. From 1999 to 2009 he was the Minister of Finance in the government of his immediate predecessor, Gary Doer. Selinger was the member of the Legislative Assembly of Manitoba for St. Boniface from 1999 until his resignation in early 2018. His party was defeated by Brian Pallister and the Progressive Conservatives in the 2016 Manitoba general election.

== Early life and education ==
Selinger was born in Regina, Saskatchewan, the son of Margaret Eva (Crawford) and Nicodemus Selinger. He came to Manitoba from Saskatchewan as a child with his single mother, who ran a small clothing store in Winnipeg.

Selinger received a Bachelor of Social Work from the University of Manitoba, a Master of Public Administration from Queen's University, and a PhD from the London School of Economics.

Before entering politics, he worked as an associate professor in the Faculty of Social Work at the University of Manitoba, and sat on the boards of the St. Boniface Hospital, the St. Boniface Museum, the Community Income Tax Service Boards, and as president of the Old St. Boniface Residents Association.

== Municipal politics ==
After joining an alliance of progressive municipal politicians called Winnipeg into the '90s in the late 1980s, Selinger was elected to the Winnipeg City Council in 1989 as a candidate of the alliance in St. Boniface, defeating incumbent Guy Savoie. During his time as a city councillor, Selinger was a member of the Executive Policy Committee and was the chair of the Committee on Finance and Administration.

In 1992, Selinger ran for Mayor of Winnipeg and came in second place, losing to Susan Thompson. Some have attributed his loss to his refusal to accept corporate and union donations, which he based on principle. The 1992 civic election had 17 nominated candidates running for Mayor which resulted in votes getting split amongst several candidates similarly aligned on the political spectrum.

== Post municipal career ==
Following his failed mayoral bid, Selinger stepped back from politics and returned to teaching at the University of Manitoba.

== Provincial politics ==
=== Minister of Finance ===
Selinger was easily elected to the Manitoba legislature in the provincial election of 1999, defeating his closest opponent, Liberal Jean-Paul Boily, by 5439 votes to 2994 in the Winnipeg riding of St. Boniface.

Selinger was appointed Minister of Finance, after the 1999 election, in Gary Doer's first cabinet, and was also given responsibility for French Language Services, the administration of the Crown Corporations Review and Accountability Act and the administration of the Manitoba Hydro Act. In his ten years as Minister of Finance, Selinger balanced every budget. On January 17, 2001, he was also given responsibility for the Civil Service.

Following a cabinet shuffle on September 25, 2002, he was charged with the administration of the Liquor Control Act, while being relieved of his duties for the Manitoba Hydro Act.

In 2003, Selinger supported Bill Blaikie's campaign to lead the federal New Democratic Party.

Selinger was re-elected in the provincial election of 2003 with almost 75% of the vote in his riding. On November 4, 2003, he was relieved of responsibilities for the Liquor Control Act.

In January 2005, Selinger announced that his government would change its system of accounting for expenditures and revenues. This followed a request from Auditor General Jon Singleton, who criticized the government for listing crown corporation losses and other matters as off-budget spending. Selinger is considered a strong performer in the Doer Cabinet.

He was re-elected in the 2007 provincial election.

On June 28, 2007, Selinger regained responsibility for the administration of the Liquor Control Act and was charged with the administration of The Manitoba Lotteries Corporation Act.

=== Premier ===
On September 8, 2009, Selinger resigned from his cabinet position and announced his candidacy for the leadership of the New Democratic Party of Manitoba. He was running against fellow cabinet ministers Steve Ashton and Andrew Swan until Swan dropped out of the race on September 28. The leadership convention took place on October 17, 2009. Rosann Wowchuk replaced Selinger as interim Minister of Finance. He defeated his leadership rival, Steve Ashton, taking 1,317 votes among delegates, to Ashton's 685. Selinger was sworn in as Premier of Manitoba by the Lieutenant Governor of Manitoba on October 19, 2009, the same day that Gary Doer was sworn in as Canadian Ambassador to the United States. Despite predictions of defeat, Selinger led the NDP to its fourth straight majority government in the October 2011 general election, surpassing Doer's record and winning 37 seats.

In April 2013, the Selinger government reneged on an earlier promise to not increase sales taxes by implementing a 1% increase in the provincial sales tax rate from 7% to 8%, which resulted in a precipitous decline in popular support for the government and, ultimately, a caucus revolt against Selinger's leadership culminating in the resignation of five cabinet ministers. Due, in part, to the unpopularity of the tax increase, the NDP fell far behind the Progressive Conservatives in public opinion polls and never recovered. In the fall of 2014 several cabinet ministers privately asked Selinger to resign in hopes that the party would recover under a new leader, but he declined. In September 2014, during a caucus retreat, several MLAs openly told Selinger he needed to resign but he refused.

A month later, at the end of October Minister of Finance Jennifer Howard (Fort Rouge), Minister of Municipal Government Stan Struthers (Dauphin), Minister for Jobs and the Economy Theresa Oswald (Seine River), Andrew Swan (Minto), Minister of Health Erin Selby (Southdale), and several senior party officials went public with their call for Selinger's resignation. Selinger asked ministers, labeled the "gang of five" in the media, to either disavow their public statements or quit. The five resigned on Monday, November 3. The same day Selinger said in a statement he was saddened by their decisions but had made it clear they could either "focus on the priorities of Manitoba families as part of our team, or resign." Selinger accepted the resignations of the five senior cabinet ministers and installed their replacements hours later. On November 9, Selinger asked the party executive to hold a leadership election during the party's annual convention scheduled for March 6–8, 2015, stating his intention to be a candidate. The party executive subsequently agreed. Theresa Oswald, one of the five rebel ex-ministers, challenged Selinger for the leadership as did Minister of Infrastructure and Transportation Steve Ashton who had not protested against Selinger but who resigned from cabinet to enter leadership contest.

At the March 8, 2015 leadership election, Ashton was eliminated on the first ballot and Selinger prevailed on the second ballot with 50.93% of ballots cast, defeating Oswald by 33 votes.

Selinger's popularity never recovered after his party raised the PST in 2013. By the time the writs were dropped for the 2016 provincial election, the NDP had been well behind the Tories in opinion polling for almost four years. The NDP was heavily defeated, falling to only 14 seats, its smallest seat count in three decades.

== After politics ==
Selinger resigned as party leader following his government's defeat and returned to the backbench. Selinger announced on February 20, 2018, that he was resigning his seat in the legislature effective March 7, 2018. He continues to reside in Winnipeg.

== Electoral record ==
2016 Manitoba general election: St. Boniface
Party	Candidate	Votes	%	±%	Expenditures
New Democratic	Greg Selinger	3,624	42.41	-26.47	$10,697.28
Progressive Conservative	Mamadou Ka	2,211	25.87	+7.97	$18,430.93
Liberal	Alain Landry	1,663	19.46	+12.40	$3,387.94
Green	Signe Knutson	1,048	12.26	+6.09	$0.00
Total valid votes/expense limit		8,546	98.38	-	$45,064.00
Total rejected ballots		141	1.62	+1.18	
Turnout		8,687	63.67	+4.17	
Eligible voters		13,644			
New Democratic hold		Swing		-17.22	
Source: Elections Manitoba

2011 Manitoba general election: St. Boniface
Party	Candidate	Votes	%	±%	Expenditures
New Democratic	Greg Selinger	5,914	68.87	+2.53	$25,356.02
Progressive Conservative	Frank Clark	1,537	17.90	+4.94	$6,094.72
Liberal	Brad Gross	606	7.06	−6.58	$641.00
Green	Alain Landry	530	6.17	−0.74	$96.10
Total valid votes		8,587	99.56		
Rejected and declined ballots		38	0.44		
Turnout		8,625	59.50		
Electors on the lists		14,496			

2009 New Democratic Party of Manitoba leadership election
Candidate	Votes	Percentage
Greg Selinger	1,317	65.75%
Steve Ashton	685	34.20%
Spoiled ballots	1	0.05%
Total	2,003	100.00%

2007 Manitoba general election: St. Boniface
Party	Candidate	Votes	%	±%	Expenditures
New Democratic	Greg Selinger	5,090	66.04	−8.30	$16,599.60
Liberal	Gilbert Laberge	1,049	13.61	−0.82	$3,582.87
Progressive Conservative	Jennifer Tarrant	993	12.88	+1.65	$722.42
Green	Alain Landry	530	6.88	+6.88	$378.57
Communist	Thane-Dominic Carr	45	0.58	+0.58	$373.97
Total valid votes		7,707	100.00		
Rejected and declined ballots		38			
Turnout		7,745	59.56		
Electors on the lists		13,004			

2003 Manitoba general election: St. Boniface
Party	Candidate	Votes	%	±%	Expenditures
New Democratic	Greg Selinger	4,904	74.34	+17.77	$18,257.78
Liberal	Dougald Lamont	952	14.43	-16.71	$5,020.72
Progressive Conservative	Dan Zahari	741	11.23	-1.05	$769.27
Total valid votes		6,597	100.00		
Rejected and declined ballots		38			
Turnout		6,635	52.19		
Electors on the lists		12,712			

1999 Manitoba general election: St. Boniface
Party	Candidate	Votes	%	±%	Expenditures
New Democratic	Greg Selinger	5,439	56.57	+24.56	
Liberal	Jean-Paul Boily	2,994	31.14	-14.34	
Progressive Conservative	Robert Olson	1,181	12.28	-6.79	
Total valid votes		9614	100.00		
Rejected and declined ballots		63			
Turnout		9677	74.35		
Electors on the lists		13,015			

1992 Winnipeg mayoral election
Candidate	Votes	Percentage
Susan Thompson	89,743	39.01%
Greg Selinger	75,123	32.66%
Dave Brown	31,859	13.85%
Ernie Gilroy	26,001	11.30%
Natalie Pollock	1,311	0.57%
Dan Zyluk	833	0.36%
Darryl Soshycki	727	0.32%
Walter Diawol	553	0.24%
Menardo A. Caneda	534	0.23%
Martin Barnes	526	0.23%
James W. Miller (Pin The Elder)	500	0.22%
Bryan R. Benson	491	0.21%
Bob McGugan	433	0.19%
Charles-Alwyn Scotlend	421	0.18%
Ed Hay	374	0.16%
Aurel Joseph Prefontaine	348	0.15%
Rudolph Parker	267	0.12%
Total	230,044	100.00%

Political offices
Preceded by Gary Doer	Premier of Manitoba; October 19, 2009 – May 3, 2016	Succeeded by Brian Pallister
Preceded by Gary Doer	Manitoba Minister of Federal/Provincial Relations; October 19, 2009 – May 3, 2016	Succeeded by Brian Pallister
Preceded by Harold Gilleshammer	Manitoba Minister of Finance; October 5, 1999 – September 8, 2009	Succeeded by Rosann Wowchuk
Legislative Assembly of Manitoba
Preceded by Neil Gaudry	Member of the Legislative Assembly for St. Boniface; September 21, 1999 –March 7, 2018	Succeeded by Dougald Lamont
Winnipeg City Council
Preceded by Guy Savoie	City Councilor for St. Boniface; October 25, 1989 – October 28, 1992	Unknown
Party political offices
Preceded by Gary Doer	Leader of the New Democratic Party of Manitoba; October 17, 2009– May 7, 2016	Succeeded by Flor Marcelino; Interim
