= Libertarian Party of Manitoba candidates in the 1995 Manitoba provincial election =

Listing of candidates

The Libertarian Party of Manitoba fielded six candidates in the 1995 provincial election, none of whom were elected. Information about these candidates may be found on this page.

== Guy Beaudry (Concordia) ==
Beaudry has campaigned for both the federal and provincial Libertarian parties. He listed himself as a clerk in the 1988 federal election.

Electoral record
Election	Division	Party	Votes	%	Place	Winner
1988 federal	St. Boniface	Libertarian	425		5/7	Ron Duhamel, Liberal
1990 provincial	Concordia	Libertarian	135	1.7	5/5	Gary Doer, New Democratic Party
1995 provincial	Concordia	Libertarian	104	1.4	4/4	Gary Doer, New Democratic Party

== Alexander Pressey (Fort Garry) ==
Alexander W. Pressey was born in 1939 to a Ukrainian Canadian family in Ethelbert, Manitoba. He is a noted psychologist, with a Master of Arts (MA) degree from the University of Manitoba and a Ph.D. from the University of Alberta. He also served in the Canadian Armed Forces during the 1950s and 1960s, attaining the rank of captain. He joined the Department of Psychology at the University of Manitoba as an assistant professor in 1964, and attained the title of Professor of Psychology in 1973. He is the editor and co-author of Readings in general psychology: Canadian contributions (1970), and has published over sixty articles in various journals. He was president of the board of the Manitoba Psychological Society in 1970–71.

Pressey criticized the Canadian Broadcasting Corporation for its coverage of Manitoba's bilingualism controversy in 1984, arguing that the broadcaster was biased in favour of the entrenchment of francophone rights. He later criticized the modern environmentalist movement, writing in 2007 that popular belief in man-made global warming is based on superstition. He received 91 votes (0.7%) as a Libertarian candidate in 1995, finishing in fourth place against Progressive Conservative incumbent Rosemary Vodrey.
