= Peter Olfert =

Canadian trade unionist

- Born: Steinbach, Manitoba, Canada
- Occupation: labour leader

Peter Olfert is a Canadian labour leader in Manitoba, Canada. Olfert was president of the Manitoba Government and General Employees’ Union (formerly the Manitoba Government Employees' Association) from 1986 to 2010. He has also served as a vice-president of the National Union of Public and General Employees.

Olfert was raised in a Mennonite family in Steinbach, and later moved to Winnipeg. He completed his Grade 12, was a maintenance worker and embalmer in the 1970s, and served as a postal clerk in the Department of Government Services before being chosen as MGEU president. He attended Labour College in Ottawa in 1985.

Olfert has represented his union in negotiations with three different provincial governments. He was often critical of the austerity measures pursued by Premier Gary Filmon's administration in the 1990s, and at one stage accused Filmon of intimidating the union into silence. He was also a frequent opponent of Labour Minister Vic Toews, and led home-care workers and casino workers in protracted battles against the government in 1996.

In 1997, Olfert endorsed a provincial deal to end the Filmon government's policy of wage freezes and unpaid days off. In the same period, he worked in a successful battle to extend employee benefits to same-sex couples.

Filmon's government was defeated by the New Democratic Party under Gary Doer in the 1999 provincial election (Doer, ironically, was Olfert's predecessor as MGEU president). Olfert's union accepted a deal to allow for optional unpaid leave days in 2002, though he has nonetheless engaged in several difficult negotiations with the Doer government.

Olfert became acting chairman of the Crocus Investment Fund in late 2004, at a time when the fund announced that it was freezing sales and reviewing the value of its assets. He submitted his resignation in May 2005, after the fund experienced further difficulties. Shortly thereafter, he said that he was shocked by reports of lavish overspending by officers, and added that he had not always been given accurate information about the fund.
