= Jon Singleton (accountant) =

Canadian public servant

Jon Singleton is a public servant in Manitoba, Canada. He is best known for his high-profile tenure as Auditor General of Manitoba from 1996 to 2006.

Singleton holds a Bachelor of Science degree from the University of Manitoba. He became a chartered accountant in 1976, and a certified information systems auditor in 1982. Before being appointed as Auditor General, he was vice-president (finance) for the provincial Crown Corporations Council.

As Auditor General, Singleton frequently criticized the accounting practices of the provincial governments of Gary Filmon and Gary Doer. He argued that both the Filmon and Doer governments used questionable accounting to present the province as having a surplus budget. In response to criticism, the Doer government announced in 2005 that it would adopt Generally Accepted Accounting Principles. When he retired the following year, Singleton described this as his greatest accomplishment in office.

In 2005, Singleton accused the former directors of the failed Crocus Investment Fund of misleading investors and approving extravagant expenses. He also criticized the Doer government for not taking immediate action when concerns about the fund were first raised in 2001. Former executives of the fund challenged his claims.
