= Manitoba Government and General Employees' Union =

- Abbreviation: MGEU
- Type: Trade union
- Headquarters: Winnipeg, Manitoba, Canada
- Location: Manitoba, Canada
- Members: 32,000
- President: Kyle Ross
- Affiliations: Manitoba Federation of Labour; National Union of Public and General Employees
- Website: mgeu.ca
- Formerly called: Provincial Club (1935–1950); Manitoba Government Employees' Association (1950–1992); Manitoba Government Employees' Union (1992–2000)

The Manitoba Government and General Employees' Union (MGEU) is a trade union in Manitoba, Canada. It has over 32,000 members, and is one of the largest unions in Manitoba. The MGEU represents workers from different fields, including the civil service, Crown corporations, and universities and colleges.

The MGEU traces its historical roots to the Manitoba Civil Servants' Association, which was formed around the time of the 1919 Winnipeg General Strike. The MCSA had drifted apart by the 1930s, and civil servants formed several recreational associations in its place. These groups were united in 1935 as the Provincial Club, which represented its members on employment-related issues. In 1950, it changed its name to the Manitoba Government Employees' Association.

The union was radically restructured in 1974, and affiliated with the Canadian Labour Congress. It changed its name to the Manitoba Government Employees' Union in 1992, and chose its current name in 2000.

Gary Doer, former Premier of Manitoba, was president of the MGEU from 1979 to 1986. He was succeeded by Peter Olfert, who held the position until 2010.

== Bargaining units ==
Manitoba Civil Service, Manitoba Liquor Control Commission, Manitoba Public Insurance, University College of the North, Red River College, Assiniboine Community College, Various Health Care Facilities, Addictions Foundation of Manitoba, Peak of the Market, Centennial Centre, Manitoba Housing Authority, Brandon University, Main Street Project, Hecla Golf Course, Manitoba Horse Racing Commission, Winnipeg Art Gallery, University of Winnipeg Students Association, Various Shelters and Crisis Centres, Canadian Blood Services, Manitoba Gaming Control Commission, Deaf Centre Manitoba, Various Child Care Facilities, Manitoba Lotteries Corporation Food and Beverage Division , Pam Am Clinic, Various Clinics, Medical Facilities, and Care Homes, and Social Workers.

== Presidents ==
- 1973–1976: Bill Ridgeway
- 1976–1979: William Jackson
- 1979–1986: Gary Doer
- 1986–2010: Peter Olfert
- 2010–2012: Lois Wales
- 2012–2021: Michelle Gawronsky
- 2021–present: Kyle Ross
