= Minister of Federal/Provincial Relations (Manitoba) =

The Minister of Federal/Provincial Relations was a cabinet minister in the province of Manitoba, Canada.

The position had existed since the 1960s and had always been held by the Premier of Manitoba. The minister was responsible for representing the Executive Council of Manitoba in discussions with the Government of Canada.

The last minister was Greg Selinger.

== List of ministers of federal/provincial relations in Manitoba ==
Name	Party	Took office	Left office
Dufferin Roblin	Progressive Conservative	June 30, 1958	November 27, 1967
Gary Filmon	Progressive Conservative	May 9, 1988	October 5, 1999
Gary Doer	New Democratic Party	October 5, 1999	October 19, 2009
Greg Selinger	New Democratic Party	October 19, 2009	May 3, 2016

It is not clear if Premiers Walter Weir, Edward Schreyer, Sterling Lyon and Howard Pawley also took the title of Minister of Federal/Provincial Relations.
