= Matt Wiebe =

Canadian politician (born 1979)

The Honourable Matt Wiebe MLA
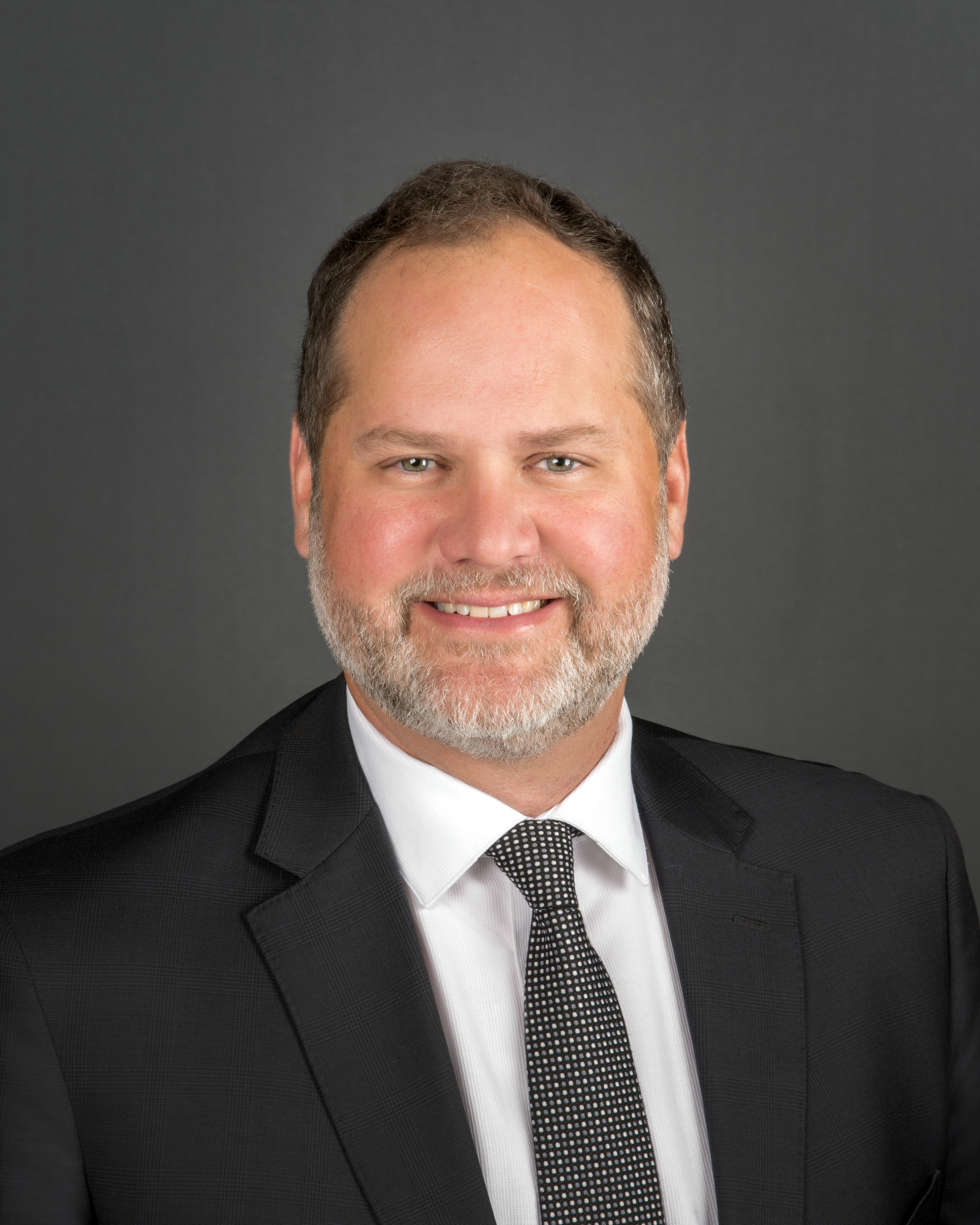
- Wiebe in 2023

Manitoba Minister of Justice and Attorney General Minister for Manitoba Public Insurance Corporation Act
- Incumbent
- Assumed office October 18, 2023
- Premier: Wab Kinew
- Preceded by: Kelvin Goertzen

Member of the Legislative Assembly of Manitoba for Concordia
- Incumbent
- Assumed office March 2, 2010
- Preceded by: Gary Doer

Personal details
- Born: Matthew Robert Rudolph Wiebe; 1979 (age 46–47) Winnipeg, Manitoba, Canada
- Party: New Democratic Party of Manitoba
- Spouse: Kaila Wiebe
- Children: 2
- Education: University of Manitoba (BA, MPA)
- Website: www.mbndp.ca/mattwiebe

Matthew Robert Rudolph "Matt" Wiebe (born 1979), MLA is a Canadian politician who is the current Minister of Justice and Attorney General and Minister for Manitoba Public Insurance Corporation Act for Manitoba since October 18, 2023. A member of the New Democratic Party of Manitoba (NDP), he represents the electoral district of Concordia. Wiebe was elected to the Legislative Assembly of Manitoba in a by-election on March 2, 2010. He succeeded the province's former premier, Gary Doer. He has been re-elected in the general elections of 2011, 2016, 2019, and 2023. Wiebe previously served as Whip for the NDP while it was Official Opposition and the Critic for the departments of Municipal Relations and Infrastructure from 2019 to 2023.

Matt Wiebe was born and raised in the northeast Winnipeg suburb of East Kildonan. He attended River East Collegiate and graduated in 1997. He attended the University of Winnipeg, from which he graduated with a Bachelor of Arts degree in economics. He went on to earn a master's degree in public administration at the same university.

Before becoming an MLA, Wiebe worked as a constituency assistant in the offices of Doer (provincially) and NDP Member of Parliament Bill Blaikie (federally).

== Electoral record ==
Manitoba provincial by-election, March 2, 2010: Concordia Resignation of Gary Doer
Party	Candidate	Votes	%	±%	Expenditures
New Democratic	Matt Wiebe	2,065	58.90	-10.15	$20,394.67
Progressive Conservative	Brian Biebrich	694	19.79	-1.82	$9,160.24
Liberal	Judi Heppner	613	17.48	11.48	$5,750.52
Green	Ellen Young	134	3.82	0.50	$762.27
Total valid votes		3,506	–	–	
Rejected		11	–		
Eligible voters / turnout		11,150	31.44	-15.98	
Source(s) Source:

2011 Manitoba general election: Concordia
Party	Candidate	Votes	%	±%	Expenditures
New Democratic	Matt Wiebe	4,008	63.06	4.16	$15,634.85
Progressive Conservative	Naseer Warraich	1,803	28.37	8.57	$29,145.84
Green	Ryan Poirier	308	4.85	1.02	$0.00
Liberal	Isaiah Oyeleru	237	3.73	-13.76	$641.00
Total valid votes		6,356	–	–	
Rejected		34	–		
Eligible voters / turnout		12,834	49.79	18.35	
Source(s) Source: Manitoba. Chief Electoral Officer (2011). Statement of Votes for the 40th Provincial General Election, October 4, 2011 (PDF) (Report). Winnipeg: Elections Manitoba. "Election Returns: 40th General Election". Elections Manitoba. 2011.

2016 Manitoba general election: Concordia
Party	Candidate	Votes	%	±%	Expenditures
New Democratic	Matt Wiebe	2,761	44.97	-18.09	$28,493.70
Progressive Conservative	Andrew Frank	2,483	40.44	12.07	$21,965.28
Liberal	Donovan Martin	642	10.46	6.73	$7,841.60
Manitoba	Terry Scott	254	4.14	–	$548.47
Total valid votes		6,140	–	–	
Rejected		101	–		
Eligible voters / turnout		11,538	54.09	4.30	
Source(s) Source: Manitoba. Chief Electoral Officer (2016). Statement of Votes for the 41st Provincial General Election, April 19, 2016 (PDF) (Report). Winnipeg: Elections Manitoba. "Election Returns: 41st General Election". Elections Manitoba. 2016.

2019 Manitoba general election: Concordia
Party	Candidate	Votes	%	±%	Expenditures
New Democratic	Matt Wiebe	4,305	59.69	+14.72	$18,272.23
Progressive Conservative	Andrew Frank	2,295	31.82	-8.62	$11,453.01
Liberal	Maria Albo	612	8.49	-1.97	$0.00
Total valid votes		7,212	–	–	
Rejected		67	–		
Eligible voters / turnout		15,021	48.46	-5.63	
Source(s) Source: Manitoba. Chief Electoral Officer (2019). Statement of Votes for the 42nd Provincial General Election, September 10, 2019 (PDF) (Report). Winnipeg: Elections Manitoba. "Candidate Election Returns". Elections Manitoba. Elections Manitoba.

2023 Manitoba general election: Concordia
Party	Candidate	Votes	%	±%	Expenditures
New Democratic	Matt Wiebe	4,235	64.52	+4.83	$12,636.54
Progressive Conservative	Alex Rogers	1,848	28.15	-3.67	$0.00
Liberal	Trish Rawsthorne	481	7.33	-1.16	$0.00
Total valid votes/expense limit		6,564	99.27	–	$58,494.00
Total rejected and declined ballots		48	0.73	–	
Turnout		6,612	44.03	-4.43	
Eligible voters		15,018			
New Democratic hold		Swing		+4.25	
Source(s) Source: Elections Manitoba
