= Minister charged with the administration of The Crown Corporations Public Review and Accountability Act (Manitoba) =

The Minister charged with the administration of The Crown Corporations Public Review and Accountability Act is a government position in the province of Manitoba, Canada. It is not a full portfolio, and has always been held by ministers with other cabinet responsibilities.

The current minister is Greg Selinger.

== List of ministers responsible for the Liquor Control Act ==
Name	Party	Took office	Left office
Gary Doer (*)	New Democratic Party	August 19, 1987	May 9, 1988
Clayton Manness (*)	Progressive Conservative	May 9, 1988	September 10, 1993
Harold Gilleshammer	Progressive Conservative	February 5, 1999	October 5, 1999
Gregory Selinger	New Democratic Party	October 5, 1999	September 14, 2009

- Doer was designated as Minister responsible for the Accountability of Crown Corporations.
- Gilleshammer was designated as Minister charged with the administration of The Crown Corporations Public Review and Accountability Act.
