= Minister of Crown Investments (Manitoba) =

The Minister of Crown Investments was a cabinet position in Manitoba, Canada. The position was started by the government of Howard Pawley in 1982, and discontinued by the incoming government of Gary Filmon in 1988.

== List of ministers of Crown investments ==
| Name | Party | Took office | Left office |
| Wilson Parasiuk | New Democratic Party | January 20, 1982 | November 4, 1983 |
| Vic Schroeder | New Democratic Party | November 4, 1983 | February 7, 1987 |
| Gary Doer | New Democratic Party | February 7, 1987 | May 9, 1988 |
