= William Jackson (Canadian administrator) =

Canadian administrator

William Jackson is a Canadian administrator. He has served in several fields during his professional career.

Jackson was president of the Manitoba Government Employees' Association (MGEA) from 1976 to 1979. He co-chaired a government task force on restructuring the provincial bureaucracy in this period, but resigned in dramatic fashion in February 1978 to protest layoffs in the civil service.

Later in the year, he signed an agreement with Sterling Lyon's government to give workers protection against layoffs and the contracting out of services. In 1979, Jackson was appointed president of the National Union of Provincial Government Employees (NUPGE).

Jackson ran for the leadership of the Manitoba Liberal Party in 1980, but withdrew from the contest before the leadership convention. He had been considered a frontrunner and said that his departure was due to personal difficulties. He was subsequently forced to stand down as president of the NUPGE, after its executive determined that he had violated the union's non-partisan status.

Jackson later served as executive director of the Albert Schweitzer Hospital in the Haiti from 1981 to 1985, when he became director of administration of the Canadian Organization of Development through Education. He was appointed to the Toronto branch of the Immigration and Refugee Board of Canada in 1988 and was re-appointed in 1998, serving as Coordinating Member of the Convention Refugee Determination Division.
