= Ontario Public Service Employees Union =

Canadian trade union

- Founded: 1975
- Headquarters: Toronto, Ontario, Canada
- Location: Canada
- Members: ~180,000
- Key people: JP Hornick, president. Laurie Nancekivell, First-VP/Treasurer
- Affiliations: CLC, NUPGE
- Website: opseu.org

The Ontario Public Service Employees Union (OPSEU; French: Syndicat des employés de la fonction publique de l'Ontario [SEFPO]) is a trade union representing public sector employees in the province of Ontario, Canada. It claims a membership of approximately 180,000 members. OPSEU was established in 1975 as the successor union to the former Civil Service Association of Ontario, which was founded in 1911. In 1979, OPSEU affiliated with the Canadian Labour Congress, the National Union of Public and General Employees, and the Ontario Federation of Labour. OPSEU is affiliated to several labour councils across Ontario.

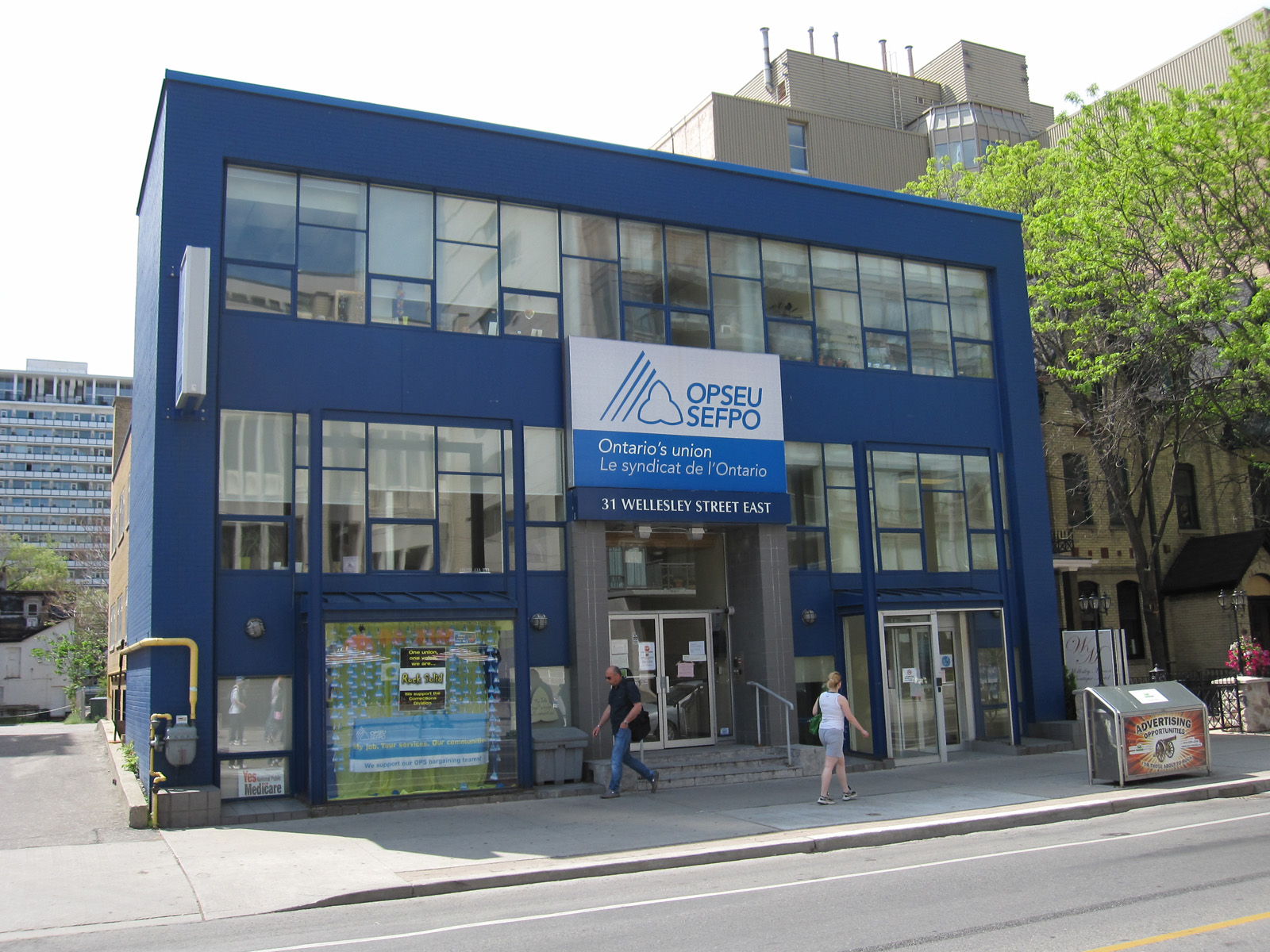
An OPSEU union hall in the Church and Wellesley neighbourhood of Toronto.

The current President is JP Hornick, who was elected to the position in April 2022. Laurie Nancekivell is the union's First Vice-President/Treasurer and was also first elected at the 2022 Convention.

== Membership and structure ==
The union is structured into local occupational groups, units or locals. Most members of OPSEU work for the Ontario Public Service, municipal governments and services, and the public college system. Additionally, some members work for private companies or organizations that are contracted to provide a public service such as hospitals and medical laboratories. The list of bargaining units includes Colleges of Applied Arts & Technology - Academic (CAAT-A) with about 12,000 members, just under 10% of OPSEU's total membership, Colleges of Applied Arts & Technology - Support (CAAT-S), Hospital Professionals Division Central Provisions (HPD), Liquor Control Board of Ontario (LCBO), Municipal Property Assessment Corporation (MPAC), Ontario Public Service (OPS). Other members include ambulance, developmental services, boards of education, children's aid societies, community agencies, long-term care, universities, hospital professionals, hospital support, municipalities, child treatment centres, municipal property assessment, mental health, Canadian Blood Services and Diagnostics. "OPSEU also represents members in many boards, Crown agencies, and tribunals, such as the Workplace Safety and Insurance Appeals Tribunal, the Ontario Pension Board, the Ontario New Democratic Party Caucus, the Ontario Teachers’ Pension Plan Board, and the Alcohol and Gaming Commission of Ontario."

In June, 2016, part-time support staff at all Ontario colleges held a vote on whether to join OPSEU. The College Employer Council blocked the counting of the ballots for more than a year, eventually losing. When the ballots were counted in January, 2018, 84% were in favour, leading to approximately 20,000 part-time support staff joining the union. OPSEU called this "the largest union organizing drive in Canadian history."

In October, 2017, part-time and sessional college faculty held a vote to join the union, but the results were not known until April of 2025 because of College Employer Council attempts to block the counting of the ballots. Part-Time and Sessional Faculty have been members of the union since April 11, 2025.

== Strike history ==
=== Ontario Public Service strikes ===
==== The First Strike: 1996 ====
In 1993, Ontario's first NDP government altered the legislation governing Ontario Public Service employees to allow them to strike. In 1996, Ontario Public Service employees struck legally (Correctional Officers struck illegally in 1979) for the first time in their history. The strike was deeply political; OPSEU rallied against the Mike Harris government's proposed job cuts. The tension between the Government and OPSEU culminated on March 18, 1996 in a confrontation between the OPP and OPSEU strikers at Queen's Park in Toronto. Ontario Provincial Police riot control officers were called in to escort members of parliament who were being prevented from entering the legislature. MPPs were pelted with rocks and paper cups when they tried to cross the line. The confrontation escalated when police began to push through the line of protesters and violence erupted. At least half a dozen protesters were injured.

==== 2002 ====
The second strike between OPSEU and the provincial government lasted 54 days (March 13 to May 5) in 2002. Again, tensions between managers and the union were strong. Although there was no bloody confrontation between the union and the government during this strike, there was a strong division between union members and management.

=== College strikes, CAAT-A ===
==== 1984 ====
College faculty were on strike from Oct. 16 until November 9, when they were legislated back to work.

==== 1989 ====
8,800 faculty members at Ontario's 22 community colleges went on strike on October 19, 1989. The strike ended on November 14 when OPSEU and the Ontario Council of Regents agreed to binding arbitration after back-to-work legislation was threatened. At the time, the average earnings of a teacher was about $47,000, and salaries ranged from $22,800 to $52,250.

==== 2006 ====
On March 7, 2006, roughly 9,100 faculty at Ontario's 24 colleges went on strike. Faculty returned to work on March 27 after 18 days on strike. At the time, full-time faculty had "a starting salary of about $32,000, an average pay of about $75,000 and a 16-year progression to reach top wage levels in their collective agreement, according to the union. The colleges offered a package that would have increased salaries by 12.6 per cent by the end of four years, taking the maximum pay to about $94,000. The union had proposed 12 per cent over three years."

==== 2017 ====
On October 16, 2017, roughly 12,000 full-time faculty, partial load faculty, counsellors and librarians at the province's 24 Colleges went out on strike. The OPSEU collective bargaining team for the teachers was led by J.P. Hornick, Coordinator of the School of Labour at George Brown College. Bill 178, the Colleges of Applied Arts and Technology Labour Dispute Resolution Act, 2017 was successfully passed on Sunday, November 19, 2017, ending the strike and sending the parties to mediation and binding arbitration. Faculty members returned to work on November 20. Students resumed classes on November 21, 2017. The parties agreed to employ William Kaplan as mediator-arbitrator under the legislation. He published his decision on Dec. 20, 2017, and both sides appeared to be pleased with the result. The decision included a 7.75 increase in wages over four years and a one time lump sum payment for full and part-time staff.

== Controversies ==
In May 2021, allegations of systemic racism and harassment were made against OPSEU and were documented widely in Canadian media, alleging that leadership from the Executive Board, through to then-President Warren (Smokey) Thomas were creating and supporting environments which were toxic to Black members. Specifically, previous leaders in Algonquin College's OPSEU Local 415 harassed, surveilled and excluded the new Local president, who was a Black woman. Despite investigations substantiating those events, OPSEU was sluggish to enact remedies, in effect emboldening the perpetrators. The events received political attention from New Democrat MPP Joel Harden and Laura Mae Lindo, MPP chair of the Ontario NDP Black Caucus, who wrote to Thomas regarding the issue.

In April 2021, Thomas' leadership style began being questioned and openly discussed in the media.

Thomas retired in April 2022, after 15 years a president, and a new board was elected. In January 2023, OPSEU launched a lawsuit against Thomas and two executives who served under him alleging that they had misappropriated just under $6 million in union funds.
