= British Columbia Government Employees' Union v British Columbia (AG) =

- Supreme Court of Canada

Hearing: March 3, 1988 Judgment: October 20, 1988
- Full case name: The British Columbia Government Employees' Union v. The Attorney General of British Columbia
- Citations: [1988] 2 S.C.R. 214
- Docket No.: 19518
- Prior history: Judgment for the Attorney General of British Columbia in the British Columbia Court of Appeal
- Ruling: Appeal dismissed.

Holding
- A court has the authority to find picketers in contempt of court if they obstruct people officially connected with the court or its process, or prevents the public from accessing the court, notwithstanding the picket is otherwise lawful. Preventing such picketing does not infringe the Canadian Charter of Rights and Freedoms.

Court membership
- Chief Justice: Brian Dickson; Puisne Justices: Jean Beetz, Willard Estey, William McIntyre, Antonio Lamer, Bertha Wilson, Gerald Le Dain, Gérard La Forest, Claire L'Heureux-Dubé

Reasons given
- Majority: Dickson (paras. 1–73)
- Concurrence: McIntyre (paras. 74–78)
- Beetz, Estey, and Le Dain took no part in the consideration or decision of the case.

British Columbia Government Employees' Union v British Columbia (AG), [1988] 2 S.C.R. 214 is a leading Supreme Court of Canada decision on the right to picket as a freedom of expression under section 2(b) of Canadian Charter of Rights and Freedoms.

== Background ==
In November 1983, the British Columbia Government and Service Employees' Union (BCGEU), of which the employees of the superior courts were members, went on strike. The staff of the British Columbia Supreme Court picketed outside of the court house and only let in a minimum number of people needed for urgent cases. When Chief Justice Allan McEachern arrived in the morning to see the staff picketing he went to his office and issued an order on his own motion prohibiting picket lines outside of courthouses in British Columbia.

The issues before the Supreme Court of Canada were:

1. whether the judge could constitutionally enjoin picketing of court-houses by a union representing court employees engaged in a lawful strike;
2. whether an enactment by a provincial legislature or by Parliament could validly deprive a judge of a Supreme Court of his inherent authority to protect the functions and processes of his and other courts without an amendment to the Constitution of Canada;
3. whether the order restraining picketing and other activities within the precincts of all court-houses in British Columbia infringed or denied the rights and freedoms guaranteed by ss. 2(b), (c), 7, 11(a), (c) and (d) of the Canadian Charter of Rights and Freedoms, and if so, whether the order was justified by s. 1 of the Charter.

The majority held that the judge could enjoin the picketers and that his order violated the freedom of expression under section 2(b) of the Charter, but was saved under section 1.

== See also ==
- List of Supreme Court of Canada cases (Dickson Court)
