= British Columbia General Employees' Union =

Canadian labour union

- Founded: 1919; 107 years ago
- Headquarters: Burnaby, British Columbia, Canada
- Key people: Paul Finch, President; Maria Middlemiss, Treasurer
- Affiliations: BCFED/NUPGE/CLC
- Website: www.bcgeu.ca/home

The British Columbia General Employees' Union (BCGEU) is a trade union in British Columbia, Canada which represents over 95,000 members. The union employs over 400 servicing and administrative staff in 12 area offices across the province and at the Burnaby head office. The current President of the BCGEU is Paul Finch. Finch was elected to this position in 2024. Previous Presidents were Darryl Walker, George Heyman, John T. Shields, and Stephanie Smith.

== Structure and history ==
The union was founded in 1919 as the Provincial Civil Services Association of BC, and subsequently changed its name to the B.C. Government Employees' Association in 1944, and finally the BCGEU in 1969. The union is composed of over 500 different bargaining units, the largest of which is BC government workers as delineated in the Public Sector Labour Relations Act. Over a third of the BCGEU membership work in the provincial public (government) service. The rest work in the broader public sector, including community-based social services, healthcare, education and some crown agencies and authorities, and in the private sector, including credit unions, privatized highways maintenance companies and casinos. On June 11, 2021, the union voted to rename itself from British Columbia Government and Services Employees Union to British Columbia General Employees' Union

The BCGEU first gained full bargaining rights under the BC Public Service Labour Relations Act in 1974. Since then the BCGEU has been involved in a number of precedent-setting legal cases, including BCGEU v. British Columbia on picketing rights under the Charter of Rights and Freedoms and the Meiorin case on the test for discrimination.

The basic organizational unit of the union is the Local. The union divides its membership as residing in 13 geographic areas, 1-12 inside of BC and the 13th as any member residing outside of BC. Members are further divided into occupational groupings called Components, each of which is governed by a Component Executive which has relative financial autonomy and its own spending authority.

Members are assigned into locals regardless of their employer or bargaining unit based on the geographic location of their worksite and their occupational grouping. For example, BCGEU members who are part of the Social Information and Health Component occupational grouping (Component 6), and who reside in Victoria (Area 01), are members of Local 601.

Locals elect delegates to their Component Executive, which elects their leadership, including a Vice President, once every three years. Locals also elect delegates to Convention, which is the highest governing body of the union and meets once every three years. Convention elects the Executive Committee of the union, which is composed of the President, Treasurer, and five provincial Executive Vice Presidents.

The highest governing body of the union between conventions is the Provincial Executive, which is composed of the seven (7) members of the Executive Committee elected at convention, and presently sixteen (16) members elected from Component Executives.

This is the union's current component structure:

- COMPONENT 1 - Corrections and Sheriff Services
- COMPONENT 3 - Community Social Services
- COMPONENT 4 - Health Services
- COMPONENT 5 - Retail, Stores and Warehouse
- COMPONENT 6 - Social, Information and Health
- COMPONENT 7 - Education, Scientific, Technical and Administrative
- COMPONENT 8 - Community Health Services
- COMPONENT 10 - Operational Services
- COMPONENT 12 - Administrative Professionals
- COMPONENT 17 - General Services
- COMPONENT 20 - Environmental, Technical and Operational

Most members of BCGEU Components 1, 5, 6, 12 and 20 are covered by B.C.'s Public Service Pension Plan. Most members of Components 3, 4, 7 and 8 are covered by the Municipal Pension Plan (MPP), and College instructors in Component 7 are covered by the College Pension Plan (CPP). Some members in 3, 4, 10 and 17 in the private sector are covered by the BC Target Benefit Pension Plan.

== Staff ==
Most BCGEU staff are themselves unionized, represented by either the Union Workers' Union (UWU) or MoveUP, the Movement of Union Professionals. Bargaining between the BCGEU and its servicing staff (then members of -CEP) employees broke down in 2005, resulting in a multi-week strike.
