= Newfoundland and Labrador Association of Public and Private Employees =

NAPE
- Newfoundland Association of Public and Private Employees
- Headquarters: 330 Portugal Cove Place, St. John's, Newfoundland & Labrador
- Location: Canada
- Members: 25,000
- President: Jerry Earle
- Affiliations: Canadian Labour Congress National Union of Public and General Employees
- Website: www.nape.ca

NAPE (Newfoundland Association of Public and Private Employees) is the largest trade union in Newfoundland & Labrador. NAPE represents over 25,000 employees in the public and private sector.

== Overview ==
NAPE is a trade union in Newfoundland and Labrador. It forms one of the 12 components of the National Union of Public and General Employees (NUPGE). NAPE is affiliated with the Canadian Labour Congress.

== Executive Board ==
The current executive board as of 2023 is:

Jerry Earle-President

Dwayne King-Central Vice President

Trevor King-Secretary/Treasurer

Dan Quilty-Western Vice President

Ed Smith-Eastern Vice President

Meghan Wade-General Vice President

== Newfoundland (Treasury Board) v Newfoundland and Labrador Assn of Public and Private Employees ==
Newfoundland (Treasury Board) v Newfoundland and Labrador Assn of Public and Private Employees

The Newfoundland government recognized that women were being paid less than men in many areas of employment in their province. To correct this situation they implemented a pay equity program that was to begin in 1988 and lead to equal wages for men and women. However, the province experienced severe financial difficulties and was forced to pass a bill stating that this pay equity program would not start until 1991. The appellant union argues that this was a violation of the s.15 rights of female workers, and that they should be reimbursed for the lost wages from 1988 to 1991. This amounts to approximately $24 million. The government also made many other cuts to their spending during these three years including hospital beds and teachers' salaries. Both at trial and at appeal the delay was found to amount to discrimination, but that the violation was saved under s.1.
