= Concordia (electoral district) =

Provincial electoral district in Manitoba, Canada

Coordinates: 49.913°N 97.092°W

Manitoba electoral district

Provincial electoral district
- Legislature: Legislative Assembly of Manitoba
MLA
Matt Wiebe
New Democratic
- District created: 1979
- First contested: 1981
- Last contested: 2023

Concordia is a provincial electoral district of Manitoba, Canada. It is in the northeastern part of the city of Winnipeg.

It is bordered to the south by St. Boniface, to the west by Elmwood, to the north by Rossmere, and to the east by Radisson. The riding was created by redistribution in 1979, and formally came into existence with the provincial election of 1981.

Concordia is an ethnically diverse riding, with 16% of its population born outside Canada. According to a 1999 census report, 9% of the riding's residents are aboriginal, with a further 9% of German background, and 7% of Ukrainian background.

Concordia's population in 1996 was 20,318. The average family income of the riding in 1999 was $39,613, one of the lowest in the province. Thirty-two percent of the riding's residents are listed as low-income, and 21% of its households are single-parent families. The unemployment rate in 1996 was 9.50%.

The riding's primary industry in 1999 was manufacturing (18%), followed by services (14%) and the retail trade (14%).

The New Democratic Party has represented Concordia since its creation. Gary Doer was its Member of the Legislative Assembly (MLA) from 1986, leader of the NDP from 1988, and Premier of Manitoba from 1999; he gave up all three of these positions when he was appointed as Ambassador to the United States in 2009. He had been re-elected in 2003 and 2007 with 77% and 70% of the popular vote. A by-election to succeed Doer was scheduled for March 2, 2010. In the event, Matt Wiebe, who previously worked for Doer as a constituency assistant, retained Concordia for the NDP, and he has continued to represent it since.

== List of provincial representatives ==
Parliament	Years	Member	Party
Riding created from Rossmere, Kildonan, Elmwood and Radisson
32nd	1981–1986	Peter Fox	New Democratic
33rd	1986–1988	Gary Doer	New Democratic
34th	1988–1990	Gary Doer	New Democratic
35th	1990–1995	Gary Doer	New Democratic
36th	1995–1999	Gary Doer	New Democratic
37th	1999–2003	Gary Doer	New Democratic
38th	2003–2007	Gary Doer	New Democratic
39th	2007–2009	Gary Doer	New Democratic
39th	2010–2011	Matt Wiebe	New Democratic
40th	2011–2016	Matt Wiebe	New Democratic
41st	2016–2019	Matt Wiebe	New Democratic
42nd	2019–2023	Matt Wiebe	New Democratic
43rd	2023–present	Matt Wiebe	New Democratic

== Election results ==
=== 1981 ===
1981 Manitoba general election
Party	Candidate	Votes	%
New Democratic	Peter Fox	5,333	60.91
Progressive Conservative	Scotty McVicar	2,586	29.54
Liberal	Gail Stapon	309	3.53
Progressive	Josephine Young	306	3.50
Independent	Bob Fraser	221	2.52
Total valid votes		8,755	–
Rejected		15	–
Eligible voters / Turnout		12,589	69.54
Source(s) Source: Manitoba. Chief Electoral Officer (1999). Statement of Votes for the 37th Provincial General Election, September 21, 1999 (PDF) (Report). Winnipeg: Elections Manitoba.

=== 1986 ===
1986 Manitoba general election
Party	Candidate	Votes	%	±%
New Democratic	Gary Doer	4,525	54.37	-6.54
Progressive Conservative	Brent Aubertin	2,684	32.25	2.71
Liberal	Gail Stapon	909	10.92	7.39
Western Canada Concept	Fred Cameron	204	2.45	–
Total valid votes		8,322	–	–
Rejected		13	–	
Eligible voters / Turnout		12,587	66.22	–
New Democratic hold		Swing		-4.63
Source(s) Source: Manitoba. Chief Electoral Officer (1999). Statement of Votes for the 37th Provincial General Election, September 21, 1999 (PDF) (Report). Winnipeg: Elections Manitoba.

=== 1988 ===
1988 Manitoba general election
Party	Candidate	Votes	%	±%
New Democratic	Gary Doer	3,702	37.71	-16.66
Liberal	Barbara Blomeley	2,948	30.03	19.11
Progressive Conservative	Victor Rubiletz	2,634	26.83	-5.42
Independent	Bill Seman	358	3.65	–
Western Independence	Fred Cameron	114	1.16	–
Progressive	Charles Henry	61	0.62	–
Total valid votes		9,817	–	–
Rejected		10	–	
Eligible voters / turnout		12,857	76.43	10.21
New Democratic hold		Swing		-17.89
Source(s) Source: Manitoba. Chief Electoral Officer (1999). Statement of Votes for the 37th Provincial General Election, September 21, 1999 (PDF) (Report). Winnipeg: Elections Manitoba.

=== 1990 ===
1990 Manitoba general election
Party	Candidate	Votes	%	±%
New Democratic	Gary Doer	4,588	58.17	20.46
Progressive Conservative	Vic Hubiletz	1,937	24.56	-2.27
Liberal	Gunther Grosskamper	1,059	13.43	-16.60
Western Independence	Fred Cameron	168	2.13	0.97
Libertarian	Guy Beaudry	135	1.71	–
Total valid votes		7,887	–	–
Rejected		12	–	
Eligible voters / turnout		11,551	68.38	-8.05
Source(s) Source: Manitoba. Chief Electoral Officer (1999). Statement of Votes for the 37th Provincial General Election, September 21, 1999 (PDF) (Report). Winnipeg: Elections Manitoba.

=== 1995 ===
1995 Manitoba general election
Party	Candidate	Votes	%	±%	Expenditures
New Democratic	Gary Doer	4,827	63.58	5.41	$17,879.00
Progressive Conservative	Paul Murphy	1,845	24.30	-0.26	$13,105.33
Liberal	Bret Dobbin	816	10.75	-2.68	$11,467.33
Libertarian	Guy Beaudry	104	1.37	-0.34	$477.96
Total valid votes		7,592	–	–	
Rejected		30	–		
Eligible voters / turnout		11,406	66.82	-1.56	
Source(s) Source: Manitoba. Chief Electoral Officer (1999). Statement of Votes for the 37th Provincial General Election, September 21, 1999 (PDF) (Report). Winnipeg: Elections Manitoba.

=== 1999 ===
1999 Manitoba general election
Party	Candidate	Votes	%	±%	Expenditures
New Democratic	Gary Doer	5,691	70.09	6.51	$13,477.00
Progressive Conservative	Paul Murphy	1,898	23.37	-0.93	$21,285.31
Liberal	Chris Hlady	444	5.47	-5.28	$193.61
Green	Dave Nickarz	87	1.07	–	$25.00
Total valid votes		8,120	–	–	
Rejected		48	–		
Eligible voters / turnout		12,703	64.30	-2.52	
Source(s) Source: Manitoba. Chief Electoral Officer (1999). Statement of Votes for the 37th Provincial General Election, September 21, 1999 (PDF) (Report). Winnipeg: Elections Manitoba.

=== 2003 ===
2003 Manitoba general election
Party	Candidate	Votes	%	±%	Expenditures
New Democratic	Gary Doer	4,450	76.67	6.59	$20,354.04
Progressive Conservative	Conor Lloyd	935	16.11	-7.26	$0.00
Liberal	Tanya Parks	419	7.22	1.75	$1,033.77
Total valid votes		5,804	–	–	
Rejected		38	–		
Eligible voters / turnout		12,564	46.50	-17.80	
Source(s) Source: Manitoba. Chief Electoral Officer (2003). Statement of Votes for the 38th Provincial General Election, June 3, 2003 (PDF) (Report). Winnipeg: Elections Manitoba.

=== 2007 ===
2007 Manitoba general election
Party	Candidate	Votes	%	±%	Expenditures
New Democratic	Gary Doer	3,862	69.05	-7.62	$14,144.95
Progressive Conservative	Ken Waddell	1,209	21.62	5.51	$15,745.09
Liberal	Leslie Worthington	336	6.01	-1.21	$340.30
Green	Andrew Basham	186	3.33	–	$199.88
Total valid votes		5,593	–	–	
Rejected		28	–		
Eligible voters / turnout		11,853	47.42	0.92	
Source(s) Source: Manitoba. Chief Electoral Officer (2007). Statement of Votes for the 39th Provincial General Election, May 22, 2007 (PDF) (Report). Winnipeg: Elections Manitoba.

=== 2010 by-election ===
Manitoba provincial by-election, March 2, 2010 Resignation of Gary Doer
Party	Candidate	Votes	%	±%	Expenditures
New Democratic	Matt Wiebe	2,065	58.90	-10.15	$20,394.67
Progressive Conservative	Brian Biebrich	694	19.79	-1.82	$9,160.24
Liberal	Judi Heppner	613	17.48	11.48	$5,750.52
Green	Ellen Young	134	3.82	0.50	$762.27
Total valid votes		3,506	–	–	
Rejected		11	–		
Eligible voters / turnout		11,150	31.44	-15.98	
Source(s) Source:

=== 2011 ===
2011 Manitoba general election
Party	Candidate	Votes	%	±%	Expenditures
New Democratic	Matt Wiebe	4,008	63.06	4.16	$15,634.85
Progressive Conservative	Naseer Warraich	1,803	28.37	8.57	$29,145.84
Green	Ryan Poirier	308	4.85	1.02	$0.00
Liberal	Isaiah Oyeleru	237	3.73	-13.76	$641.00
Total valid votes		6,356	–	–	
Rejected		34	–		
Eligible voters / turnout		12,834	49.79	18.35	
Source(s) Source: Manitoba. Chief Electoral Officer (2011). Statement of Votes for the 40th Provincial General Election, October 4, 2011 (PDF) (Report). Winnipeg: Elections Manitoba. "Election Returns: 40th General Election". Elections Manitoba. 2011.

=== 2016 ===
2016 Manitoba general election
Party	Candidate	Votes	%	±%	Expenditures
New Democratic	Matt Wiebe	2,761	44.97	-18.09	$28,493.70
Progressive Conservative	Andrew Frank	2,483	40.44	12.07	$21,965.28
Liberal	Donovan Martin	642	10.46	6.73	$7,841.60
Manitoba	Terry Scott	254	4.14	–	$548.47
Total valid votes		6,140	–	–	
Rejected		101	–		
Eligible voters / turnout		11,538	54.09	4.30	
Source(s) Source: Manitoba. Chief Electoral Officer (2016). Statement of Votes for the 41st Provincial General Election, April 19, 2016 (PDF) (Report). Winnipeg: Elections Manitoba. "Election Returns: 41st General Election". Elections Manitoba. 2016.

=== 2019 ===
2019 Manitoba general election
Party	Candidate	Votes	%	±%	Expenditures
New Democratic	Matt Wiebe	4,305	59.69	+14.72	$18,272.23
Progressive Conservative	Andrew Frank	2,295	31.82	-8.62	$11,453.01
Liberal	Maria Albo	612	8.49	-1.97	$0.00
Total valid votes		7,212	–	–	
Rejected		67	–		
Eligible voters / turnout		15,021	48.46	-5.63	
Source(s) Source: Manitoba. Chief Electoral Officer (2019). Statement of Votes for the 42nd Provincial General Election, September 10, 2019 (PDF) (Report). Winnipeg: Elections Manitoba. "Candidate Election Returns". Elections Manitoba. Elections Manitoba.

=== 2023 ===
2023 Manitoba general election
Party	Candidate	Votes	%	±%	Expenditures
New Democratic	Matt Wiebe	4,235	64.52	+4.83	$12,636.54
Progressive Conservative	Alex Rogers	1,848	28.15	-3.67	$0.00
Liberal	Trish Rawsthorne	481	7.33	-1.16	$0.00
Total valid votes/expense limit		6,564	99.27	–	$58,494.00
Total rejected and declined ballots		48	0.73	–	
Turnout		6,612	44.03	-4.43	
Eligible voters		15,018			
New Democratic hold		Swing		+4.25	
Source(s) Source: Elections Manitoba

== Previous boundaries ==
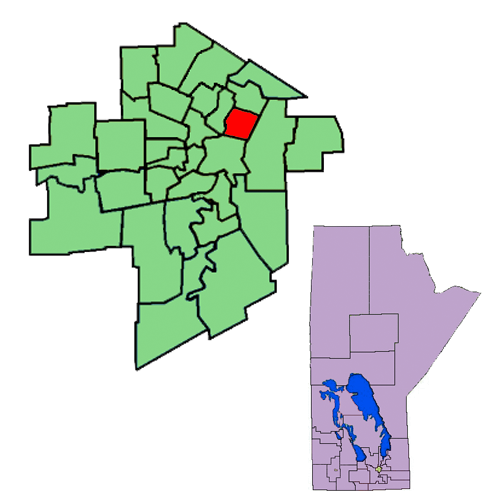
The 1999–2011 boundaries of Concordia highlighted in red.

== See also ==
- List of Manitoba provincial electoral districts
- Canadian provincial electoral districts
