= Harold Gilleshammer =

Canadian judge and politician (born 1942)

- Born: April 8, 1942 (age 84); Winnipeg, Manitoba, Canada
- Education: University of Manitoba (BA), Brandon University (BEd)
- Occupations: judge and former politician
- Years active: 1988–2003
- Known for: member, Manitoba legislature
- Notable work: various Manitoba Ministerial posts (1990–1999)
- Political party: Progressive Conservative
- Father: Olaf Gilleshammer

Harold Gilleshammer (born April 8, 1942) is a Canadian judge and former politician in Manitoba, Canada. He was a member of the Manitoba legislature from 1988 to 2003, and a Cabinet Minister in the government of Progressive Conservative Premier Gary Filmon from 1990 to 1999.

The son of Olaf Gilleshammer, he was born in Winnipeg, Manitoba. He obtained a Bachelor of Arts in History, Political Science and English from the University of Manitoba and a Bachelor of Education from Brandon University. He subsequently worked as a teacher.

Gilleshammer was first elected to the Manitoba legislature in the provincial election of 1988, in the rural riding of Minnedosa in the province's southwest. The seat has normally been safe for the Conservatives, although a rise in Liberal Party support in 1988 meant that Liberal candidate Terry Drebit was able to pose a credible challenge. Gilleshammer won the election, however, by 1,173 votes. The Progressive Conservatives formed a minority government after the election, although Gilleshammer was not initially appointed to cabinet.

Provincial support for the Liberal Party declined in 1990, and Gilleshammer defeated Drebit by over 2000 votes in that year's provincial election, in a rematch between the two candidates. Shortly after the election, Gilleshammer was named Minister of Family Services. On September 10, 1993, he was promoted to Minister of Culture, Heritage and Citizenship, with responsibility for Multiculturalism, the Liquor Control Act and A.E. McKenzie Co. Ltd. Gilleshammer was easily re-elected in the 1995 general election, finishing over 2400 votes ahead of his nearest opponent.

Following a cabinet shuffle on January 6, 1997, Gilleshammer was named Minister of Labour, with responsibility for the Civil Service Act, the Civil Service Superannuation Act, the Civil Service Supplementary Severance Benefit Act, the Public Servants Insurance Act, and the Workers Compensation Act. Shortly after Gilleshammer's appointment, the Manitoba Human Rights Commission ruled that the province who be required to provide health, dental and vision benefits to the partners of gay government workers.

Following a further cabinet shuffle on February 5, 1999, he was appointed to the high-ranking position of Minister of Finance, with responsibility for the Crown Corporations Public Review and Accountability Act. His pre-election budget offered increased spending in various fields, to be paid for by withdrawals on a government contingency fund (his critics referred to his as concealing a provincial deficit).

The Progressive Conservatives were defeated in the provincial election of 1999, although Gilleshammer was personally re-elected in Minnedosa, defeating New Democratic Party candidate Harvey Paterson by 903 votes. Following the election, he was named as the party's Deputy Leader. Gilleshammer retired from the legislature in 2003.

In 2007, Gilleshammer was appointed as a Citizenship Judge by the Canadian Minister of Citizenship and Immigration Diane Finley.
