= Crocus Investment Fund =

Canadian labour-sponsored venture capital corporation

The Crocus Investment Fund was a Manitoba-based Canadian Labour Sponsored Venture Capital Corporation. In its first four years after incorporation, the fund raised $50 million. In 2005, it was placed in receivership following investigations by Manitoba Securities Commission and the Manitoba's Auditor General.

== Background ==
Labour sponsored funds offered federal and provincial tax credits to investors and were mandated to invest the majority of their investment assets in small and medium-sized businesses in the province in which they were created. The Crocus Investment Fund was modeled after the Quebec Solidarity Fund and created by an act of the Manitoba Legislature in 1991. The original legislation required 60% of fund assets to be invested in qualified Manitoba businesses and 15% to be invested in qualified reserves. The Crocus Fund had a special mandate to promote employee ownership and employee participation in corporate governance and management.

== Early years ==
In the early years, investors received tax credits of 20% from the federal government and 20% from the provincial government. In its first four years, the Crocus Fund raised $50 million and made investments in nine Manitoba businesses. To facilitate worker ownership, the Crocus Fund developed a mechanism for facilitating worker buyouts. Under this mechanism, shares were purchased by the fund and sold to a worker trust in exchange for a security interest in the company. This vehicle was derived from American ESOPs. In September 1995, Buhler Industries became the first Canadian enterprise to receive a capital infusion using this mechanism.

One of the fund's early successes was a $4.6 million investment in the Angus Reid Group. In March 2000, Angus Reid, Canada's largest polling firm, was sold to IPSOS, a Paris-based market research company for $100 million. Reid had been privately owned by its employees and other investors, including the Crocus Fund. Prior to the IPSOS acquisition, employees held 31% of the company and the Crocus Fund held 21%.

By 2001, the Crocus Fund had more than $200 million in investment assets from 30,000 investors and had invested $137 million in 60 companies, resulting in the creation of 9,644 jobs. As well, in a first for employee ownership in North America, the Crocus Fund led the development of a University-based management training program for employee owned companies. By 2002, more than 3,500 of the 11,000 jobs created, maintained or saved in the Crocus Fund investee companies were held by employee owners.

One of the challenges the Crocus Fund faced as it matured were the amendments to the investment pacing requirements imposed by the Government of Manitoba. The province of Ontario created investment pacing requirements which required labour sponsored investment funds to invest 70% of money raised in any year in eligible Ontario businesses within 22 months. The Government of Manitoba passed similar legislation.

The Ontario legislation recognized that the asset base for investment needed to be net of any funds redeemed by shareholders and needed to exclude investment losses from the base calculation. The Manitoba legislation recognized neither, effectively requiring the fund to invest money it did not have. This created a problem in that when redemptions started, the pacing requirements would ultimately have put the fund into a financial bind. The Crocus Fund had lobbied the Government of Manitoba from the late 1990s to make the necessary changes to the legislation. The proposed changes were consistent with the rules for labour sponsored funds in other provinces.

== Voluntary cease of trading ==
Investigative reporter Dan Lett further noted that just weeks before the fund voluntarily ceased trading, the government was going to change the legislation to soften the pacing requirements. "What is significant about this is that in the wake of the Crocus collapse, Premier Doer and [Finance Minister] Selinger have always proudly proclaimed they never changed the legislation. They just failed to mention they would have, had the fund not imploded".

=== Market pressures and response ===
Investors in the fund received significant federal and provincial tax credits. In exchange for those tax credits, they could not redeem their shares for a fixed period of time. As the fund matured, redemptions increased, which limited the amount of capital available to be invested. In the meantime, successful investee companies required additional investment capital to continue to grow. Unless another local source of capital could be found, these companies would either stop growing or would need to seek funding from outside the province of Manitoba, increasing the risk of non-local control. In response, the Crocus Fund began developing a new capital pool, called the "Superfund". Superfund was to be a pool of hundreds of millions of dollars in new capital formed by contributions from the province's largest public sector pension plans and Crown corporation investment funds. By the fall of 2004, there were signs that it was going to become a reality. A local investment council, a creation of the Premier's Economic Advisory Committee, wanted to create a new capital pool with contributions by the six big public pension plans and Crown corporation investment funds. Although it was not a slam dunk Crocus would manage this fund, the local investment council was, by the fall of 2004, drafting a plan to issue a request for purple for a third-party manager. In order to make Superfund a reality, Crocus Fund chief executive Sherman Kreiner needed to bulk up the fund's management team. Two senior managers were hired.

=== Write-down of portfolio ===
In September, 2004, the two new managers proposed a major write-down of the portfolio. This was immediately followed by a restructuring proposal for an independent management company that would oversee the investment portfolio, hire all existing staff (except the current CEO) and earn money from commissions based a share of the increase in value of the assets of the fund. The Fund's CEO was deeply opposed to the creation of an independent management company because it would essentially divert profits away from shareholders to a third party manager. "I believed that a real or perceived conflict of interest would result from the creation of a management company," Kreiner said in an affidavit, "involving officers were also recommending a devaluation of shares weeks before the management company proposal."

=== Investigations ===
Disagreements among the senior managers regarding valuation of the portfolio resulted in a series of decisions by the board of directors which removed each of them from their management positions over a three-month period. A new CEO was hired in early December. His first act was to voluntarily cease trading in order to sort out the valuation issues. Investigations by the Manitoba Securities Commission and the Province's Auditor General were undertaken through the Spring of 2005. The Securities Commission indicated that it would not consider a new prospectus from Crocus if the same Board was involved.

A new Board was recruited. The new board wrote a letter to the Provincial Industry Minister asking for the province's support for several important, deal-breaking issues. The two main issues were help in getting additional insurance for the board of directors and amending the Crocus Act to ease pacing and cash reserve requirements. The Province abstained, the directors resigned and the Fund was placed in receivership.

=== Kreiner lawsuit ===
At the end of its more than a year-long investigation of the Crocus Fund, the lead investigator for the Winnipeg Free Press, Dan Lett, concluded that "Crocus was too healthy to kill." The fund's former CEO, Sherman Kreiner, subsequently sued the Provincial Auditor General to attempt to compel it to change its investigative practices. Kreiner alleged that the investigation was conducted in bad faith, that many of those named in the report were denied the opportunity to view it before it was released, that he and others were not interviewed until immediately prior to the report being released, suggesting the Auditor General came to its conclusions before interviewing all of the principals.

The OAG claimed legislative immunity to legal action, but Kreiner won two court decisions upholding his right to sue. Kreiner spent $250,000 in his legal action and abandoned the suit when it became clear it would require an additional $250,000 to go to trial. However, prior to abandoning the lawsuit, Kreiner's lawyers submitted a list of changes they wanted to see in the Auditor General's investigative practices. These included fully informing subjects of the nature of the investigation, ensuring timely interviews and giving those named the opportunity to see and respond to findings before an investigation is closed and final report released. The Auditor General has made many of these changes in its investigative practices.

In his assessment of the legal proceeding, Winnipeg Free Press investigative report Dan Lett concluded:

History will show that Kreiner’s lawsuit was abandoned, and his allegations against [Auditor General] Singleton remain unproven. History will also show that [then Auditor General] Bellringer made changes that would have, if the Crocus investigation was held today, resulted in a fairer, more accountable and more complete examination of the Crocus debacle. Some victories are unqualified. Some are merely moral victories. But in this case, a victory is a victory even if it comes too late for those initially named in the report.

In 2005, Kreiner became Managing Director of the University of Winnipeg Community Renewal Corporation, the development arm of the University of Winnipeg.
