= National Union of Public and General Employees =

Canadian trade union

- Abbreviation: NUPGE
- Formation: 1976
- Headquarters: Ottawa, Ontario, Canada
- Location: Canada
- Members: 450,000 (2025)
- President: Bert Blundon
- Secretary-treasurer: Jason MacLean
- Affiliations: Canadian Labour Congress; International Transport Workers' Federation; Public Services International
- Website: nupge.ca

The National Union of Public and General Employees (NUPGE) is a Canadian trade union. Taken in total it is the second largest union in Canada. Most of its 450,000 members work in the provincial public service sector. Its mission is to monitor provincial and federal labour laws and developments as well as analyse restructuring of social programs and public services. The national union reports on and contributes to legislation affecting the Canadian workplace.

The 13 component unions are:

- British Columbia General Employees' Union (BCGEU)
- Canadian Union of Brewery and General Workers (CUBGW)
- Health Sciences Association of Alberta (HSAA; joined 2003)
- Health Sciences Association of British Columbia (HSABC)
- Health Sciences Association of Saskatchewan (HSAS)
- Manitoba Association of Health Care Professionals (MAHCP)
- Manitoba Government and General Employees' Union (MGEU)
- New Brunswick Union of Public and Private Employees (NBU)
- Newfoundland and Labrador Association of Public and Private Employees (NAPE)
- Nova Scotia Government and General Employees Union (NSGEU)
- Ontario Public Service Employees Union (OPSEU)
- Prince Edward Island Union of Public Sector Employees (PEIUPSE)
- Saskatchewan Government and General Employees' Union (SGEU)

The Alberta Union of Provincial Employees was a member of NUPGE until 2001 when it was suspended for trying to take members from another union. Then in 2006 the AUPE decided to disaffiliate from the NUPGE and by extension the Canadian Labour Congress and Alberta Federation of Labour.
