= Office of the Auditor General Manitoba =

Auditor General of Manitoba
- Incumbent; Tyson Shtykalo since 2020
- Reports to: Legislative Assembly of Manitoba
- Appointer: Legislative Assembly of Manitoba
- Term length: 10 years
- Constituting instrument: Auditor General Act
- Precursor: Provincial Auditor (1969–2001)

Office of the Auditor General of Manitoba
- Bureau du verificauteur general du Manitoba

Office overview
- Preceding agencies: Audit Office (1876–1916); Office of the Comptroller-General (1916–69); Office of the Provincial Auditor (1969–2001)
- Headquarters: 330 Portage Ave, Winnipeg, MB
- Employees: over 55
- Website: https://www.oag.mb.ca/

The Auditor General of Manitoba is an independent officer of the Legislative Assembly of Manitoba whose role is to provide the Assembly with independent information, advice, and assurance without questioning the merits of government’s policy objectives.

The Auditor General is appointed by resolution of the Assembly on the recommendation of the Standing Committee of the Assembly on Legislative Affairs, for a renewable 10-year term.

The Auditor General examines and reports on how well the government is managing its responsibilities and resources. This is achieved by doing objective, fact-based audits that are then provided to the Assembly.

Above all else, the Auditor General and their staff must be, and be perceived to be, independent from government and the government organizations it audits.

Supported by a staff of more than 55 individuals, the Auditor General serves the Assembly, and in turn all Manitobans.

The Office of the Auditor General of Manitoba is located in Winnipeg, Manitoba, Canada.

Established in 1876, 2026 is the 150th anniversary of the Office of the Auditor General of Manitoba.

The Office

The Office of the Auditor General (the Office) has three main areas:

- Financial statement audits
- Projects:
  - Performance audits
  - Information technology (IT) audits
  - Investigations
  - Other projects
- Corporate and administrative services

Financial statement audits – Financial statement audits are examinations, by independent external auditors, of information that presents the financial position and performance of an organization at a point in time. Financial statement audits are performed using Canadian Auditing Standards.

Types of projects done by the Office:

Performance audits - Performance audits are systematic assessments of how well a government entity, program, or function is managing its activities, responsibilities, and resources. These audits may examine the government’s management practices, controls, and reporting systems based on its own public administration policies and on best practices. Performance audits are planned, performed, and reported in accordance with Canadian Standards on Assurance Engagements and Office policies.

Information technology (IT) audits – IT audits are a specific type of performance audit (see above for further info). These audits are performed in high-risk areas such as IT governance, cybersecurity, project management, systems development and changes, and IT continuity. Generally accepted frameworks and standards are applied as audit criteria, including the Control Objectives for Information and Related Technologies (COBIT) framework, the International Organization for Standardization (ISO) standards, and Center for Internet Security (CIS) controls.

Investigations – An investigation is typically launched to confirm or dispel an allegation. Sometimes these allegations are received through stakeholder concerns or from other financial statement or project work. If the Auditor General receives a request for a special audit from the Lieutenant Governor in Council, the Minister of Finance, or the Public Accounts Committee under Section 16 of The Auditor General Act an investigation may initiated.

Other projects – Other projects done by the Office include surveys, compendiums, and guides.

As of March 31, 2025, the Office had 57 full-time equivalent staff.

Training Office

The Office is a recognized Chartered Professional Accountant Training Office (Find a PPR Terms & Conditions (cpamb.ca)) meeting the profession’s practice experience requirements of providing external audit.

The Office also participates in the Canadian Audit & Accountability Foundation’s (https://caaf-fcar.ca/en) international programs which provide performance audit training for developing audit offices in a variety of countries.

== History ==
In 1876, Alexander Begg was appointed Manitoba's first Provincial Auditor. Under The Treasury Department Act, the Provincial Auditor was responsible for examining the province’s public accounts and reporting the results to the Legislature. The Audit Act, passed in 1884, was established “to provide for the better auditing of the public accounts.” It also introduced measures that attempted to enhance the independence of the Provincial Auditor. Although the Provincial Auditor was appointed by the Lieutenant-Governor, The Audit Act specified that they were responsible solely to the Legislature. This clause did not really have its intended impact, however, because the Provincial Auditor was also the Secretary of the Board of Audit, which reported to Cabinet.

In 1887, the government passed legislation replacing the Board of Audit with a Treasury Board. This change did not create any more distance between the Auditor and the Department of the Provincial Treasurer (later called the Ministry of Finance) because the Treasury Board remained a sub-committee of Cabinet.

Comptrolling and Audit Branch

Reporting directly to the Executive Council and the Provincial Treasurer, the Comptrolling and Audit Branch was established in 1915 and assumed the functions of the previous Audit Department. The Branch was formed by an amendment to The Treasury Department Act that stipulated the need for greater security concerning the expenditure of public funds and for a more efficient means of keeping public accounts. This followed the findings of the 1915 "Mathers Inquiry", a royal commission into government misuse of public funds related to the construction of the new Legislative Building led by contractor Thomas Kelly (a scandal that resulted in the resignation of the Premier).

The Branch amalgamated the functions of the former Audit Office with several comptrolling functions that were previously attached to the Office of the Provincial Treasurer into a centralized, quasi-independent entity that reported directly to both Executive Council and the Provincial Treasurer. The Branch divided its auditing functions into three separate parts: an Auditor of Revenue, an Auditor of Disbursements, and an Auditor of Purchases, which were overseen by an appointed Comptroller-General. The Comptroller-General directed the overall auditing of receipts and expenditures made by the Government of Manitoba and was also responsible for preparing all government cheques prior to their issuance by the Provincial Treasurer.

Provincial Auditor/Auditor General

In 1969, the Comptrolling and Audit Branch was dismantled following the reorganization of the Treasury Department with its comptrolling responsibilities taken by the Comptroller Division of the new Department of Finance and its auditing functions being assumed by the Office of the Provincial Auditor (OPA). These changes allowed the OPA to focus on independent reviews and reporting, rather than on financial transactions. This further strengthened the independence of the OPA—a key principle of legislative auditing. This Provincial Auditor's Office was established by The Provincial Auditor’s Act, which provided for the creation of a self-regulating, quasi-judicial agency responsible for the provision of auditing services to the provincial government.

The Provincial Auditor was renamed to Auditor General in 2002 with The Auditor General Act (2001).

== List of auditors general ==
Appointed in 1876, Alexander Begg was Manitoba's first provincial auditor. The title of this position was later changed to comptroller general, eventually changing back to Provincial Auditor, and finally to auditor general in 2002.

Name	In office
Provincial auditor
Alexander Begg	1876 – 1879
Walter R. Nursey	1879 – 1888
George Black	1888 - 1916
Comptroller-general
J. Gordon Steele	1916 – 1921
Robert Drummond	1921 – 1932
J.C.M. Ligertwood	1932 – 1936
F.B. Brisbin	1936 – 1938
C.A. Glover	1938 – 1944
George D. Iliffe	1944 – 1966
James G. McFee	1966 – 1969
Provincial auditor
James G. McFee	1969 – 1972
W.K. (Bill) Ziprick	1972 – 1985
Fred H. Jackson	1985 – 1992
Carol Bellringer	1992 – 1996
Jon W. Singleton	1996 – 2002
Auditor general
Jon W. Singleton	2002 – 2006
Carol Bellringer	2006 – 2014
Norm Ricard	2014 – 2020
Tyson Shtykalo	2020 – incumbent
