= Lawful access =

In Canadian politics, lawful access is the ability for law enforcement and security agencies to legally obtain information and data - for example, by requiring service providers to retain customer data and provide it when requested - and to intercept communications.

Conservative and Liberal governments have made numerous attempts to pass lawful access legislation in Canada, including:

- Modernization of Investigative Techniques Act (2005)
- Protecting Children from Internet Predators Act (2012)
- Lawful Access Act (2026)

== See also ==
- Lawful interception

== Sources ==
- Dheri, Pam; Cobey, Dave (October 2020). "Lawful Access & Encryption in Canada: A Policy Framework Proposal". Criminal Law Quarterly. 68 (4): 429.
