= Anti-terrorism Act, 2015 =

Canadian law of measures to stop terrorism

Parliament of Canada
- Long title: An Act to enact the Security of Canada Information Sharing Act and the Secure Air Travel Act, to amend the Criminal Code, the Canadian Security Intelligence Service Act and the Immigration and Refugee Protection Act and to make related and consequential amendments to other Acts
- Citation: Anti-terrorism Act, 2015, SC 2015, c. 20
- Considered by: House of Commons of Canada
- Considered by: Senate of Canada
- Royal assent: June 18, 2015

Legislative history

Initiating chamber: House of Commons of Canada
- Bill citation: C-51, 41st Parliament, 2nd Session
- Introduced by: Peter Van Loan MP, Minister of Public Safety and Emergency Preparedness
- First reading: House of Commons January 30, 2015
- Second reading: February 23, 2015
- Third reading: May 6, 2015

Revising chamber: Senate of Canada
- Member(s) in charge: Bob Runciman
- First reading: May 7, 2015
- Second reading: May 14, 2015
- Third reading: June 9, 2015
- Status: Amended

The Anti-terrorism Act, 2015 (French: Loi antiterroriste (2015)), introduced as, and referred to as Bill C-51, is an act of the Parliament of Canada passed by the Harper government that broadened the authority of Canadian government agencies to share information about individuals easily. It also expanded the mandate of the Canadian Security Intelligence Service (CSIS) and was described as the first comprehensive reform of this kind since 2001.

The bill was introduced and passed by the Conservative government of Prime Minister Stephen Harper. The Liberal Party supported the bill, although promised to amend the bill to improve it if elected. It was opposed by the Green Party, the Bloc Québecois, Strength in Democracy, and the New Democratic Party (NDP).

== Background ==
I think it's obvious that the attacks in October were at least inspired by the insane vision of ISIL, a genocidal terrorist organization that has explicitly, and on several occasions, said that it is targeting Canada.

— Jason Kenney, Minister of National Defence

Between 2013 and 2014, there had been twelve threat-to-VIP incidents according to the Royal Canadian Mounted Police (RCMP).

On October 20, 2014, Martin Couture-Rouleau deliberately rammed a car into a pair of Canadian Armed Forces soldiers in a shopping centre parking lot in Saint-Jean-sur-Richelieu, Quebec. "Ahmad" Couture-Rouleau had been radicalized after converting to Islam. One month before, the spokesman of the Islamic State of Iraq and the Levant (ISIL), Abu Muhammad Adnani, asked exactly for this kind of vehicular homicide. As such the attack was linked to terrorism by government and police officials, including in a statement by Prime Minister Harper.

On October 22, 2014, a series of shootings occurred on Parliament Hill and inside the Parliament of Canada in Ottawa, conducted by Michael Zehaf-Bibeau, which left one Canadian soldier and Zehaf-Bibeau dead. Prime Minister Harper labelled the shootings as a 'terrorist act', stating that "this will lead us to strengthen our resolve and redouble our efforts and those of our national security agencies to take all necessary steps to identify and counter threats and keep Canada safe here at home, just as it will lead us to strengthen our resolve and redouble our efforts to work with our allies around the world and fight against the terrorist organizations who brutalize those in other countries with a hope." After the incident security on Parliament Hill was transferred to the RCMP.

The Conservative government argued that various legislative amendments were needed to address and preempt such security threats, as well as to discourage Canadian nationals from participating as foreign terrorist fighters in conflicts abroad. The government introduced multiple pieces of legislation that affect security, privacy and the power of policy agencies such as the Protecting Canadians from Online Crime Act, the Digital Privacy Act and the Protection of Canada from Terrorists Act.

== Objective ==
Significant provisions in the act
Part	Legislation affected	Description
I	Security of Canada Information Sharing Act (new)	Authorizes Government of Canada institutions to disclose information to Government of Canada institutions that have jurisdiction or responsibilities in respect of activities that undermine the security of Canada.
II	Secure Air Travel Act (new)	A new legislative framework for identifying and responding to persons who may engage in an act that poses a threat to transportation security or who may travel by air for the purpose of committing a terrorism offence.
III	Criminal Code (amended)	recognizances to keep the peace relating to a terrorist activity or a terrorism offence; an offence of knowingly advocating or promoting the commission of terrorism offences in general; provides a judge with the power to order the seizure of terrorist propaganda or, if the propaganda is in electronic form, to order the deletion of the propaganda from a computer system; increased protection of witnesses
IV	Canadian Security Intelligence Service Act (amended)	permits the Canadian Security Intelligence Service to take, within and outside Canada, measures to reduce threats to the security of Canada, including measures that are authorized by the Federal Court.
V	Immigration and Refugee Protection Act (amended)	provision or exemption of information in certain proceedings under that act

With an expanded mandate, CSIS would be granted the ability to "disrupt terror plots, make it easier for police to limit the movements of a suspect, expand no-fly list powers, crack down on terrorist propaganda, and remove barriers to sharing security-related information."

The law's changes would make it easier for seventeen Canadian departments to exchange information between each other, including tax information from the Canada Revenue Agency.

The law provided that the Canadian government would have the ability to intercede and stop "violent Islamic jihadi terrorists" inspired by the existence of ISIL. Public Safety Minister Steven Blaney stated that the international jihadi movement had "declared war on Canada" and other countries around the world. He also stated that the new tactics granted to CSIS would only be used if there are reasonable grounds to believe a particular activity constitutes a threat to the security of Canada.

Liberal Party leader Justin Trudeau listed three ways the law will, in his view, improve the safety of Canadians:

1. by making "preventive arrest" easier when police suspect someone may be planning to carry out a terrorist activity;
2. by strengthening Canada's "no-fly list"; and
3. by improving communication and coordination on potential threats among federal agencies.

During the same exchange, when asked about what he would like to see amended further, he also said, "narrowing and limiting the kinds of new powers that CSIS and national security agencies would have." Trudeau also said the Liberals would bring in mandatory review of the law every three years, and introduce oversight of CSIS by a committee of MPs.

== Legislative history ==
Prime Minister Harper's government proposed the legislation, stating that the bill offered "considerable" oversight, and that it is a fallacy to suppose that "every time you protect Canadians, you take away their liberties."

On February 23, 2015, Bill C-51 passed the second reading in the House of Commons with a vote of 176–87.

In order to supervise the proper construction of the bill, the Conservative government planned to allot three sessions to witness testimony. After an NDP filibuster, the number of testimonies expanded to nine.

Prior to voting in favor of the amended bill Liberal leader Justin Trudeau said to students, "My hope is that this government actually realizes from public pressure that it is going to have to make significant amendments to this bill."

On March 26 the Liberal Party unveiled their proposed amendments to the bill in an online posting. Liberal Wayne Easter summarized the amendments as, "We believe that our amendments to the Anti-Terrorism Act, if accepted, will strike the right balance and address Canadians' general concerns. Our amendments fall into three categories: ensuring parliamentary oversight, instituting mandatory legislative reviews, and narrowing overly broad definitions."

The Conservatives amended the bill to include:

- Removing the word "lawful" from the section listing exemptions to the new counterterror measures addressing protests
- Clarifying that CSIS agents, while newly empowered to "disrupt" potential threats, will not be able to make arrests.
- Establishing limits on inter-agency information sharing.
- Adjusting a provision that would have given the public safety minister the power to direct air carriers to do "anything" that, in his or her view, is "reasonably necessary" to prevent a terrorist act.

The Liberal Party supported the amended bill on its third reading on May 6, which took place in the House of Commons with a final vote of 183 to 96. It later passed in the Senate on June 9 following a vote of 44 to 28 in favour.

== Criticism ==
The Canadian arm of Amnesty International indicated that the anti-terrorism bill could be used to target environmental activists and aboriginal protesters, or any other form of protest without an official permit or court order. An RCMP report names Greenpeace in language that would permit CSIS powers against them.

Daniel Therrien, the federal privacy commissioner, suggests that the bill fails to protect the safety and privacy of Canadians, for it grants unprecedented and excessive powers to government departments and agencies. His analysis indicates that Bill C-51 "opens the door to collecting, analyzing and potentially keeping forever the personal information of all Canadians," including every instance of "a person's tax information and details about a person's business and vacation travel." Ultimately, Therrien calls for significant changes and amends to Bill C-51, so that it respects privacy rights.

Law professor Craig Forcese suggests that the increase of information the bill permits would "create a new concept of information sharing that is so vast that it risks increasing the size of the haystack to such a magnitude that it becomes more difficult to find needles".

Former British Columbia member of Parliament and cabinet minister Chuck Strahl argued that there is no need for greater oversight, and the existing five-member Security Intelligence Review Committee has done a good job to date.

Lorne Dawson, a University of Waterloo sociology professor, stated that "CSIS is likely more interested in [targeting] the kind of anti-immigrant, anti-Islam sentiment that has taken root in some parts of northern Europe."

On March 4, the Conservative Party released a promotional graphic over Facebook featuring an Al-Shabaab spokesperson threatening western shopping malls, naming West Edmonton Mall specifically. It was reported in the Huffington Post that the post was judged to be "fear mongering" by some on social media.

Law professors Craig Forcese and Kent Roach state that Bill C-51 could lead to the misidentification of Canadians as terrorist suspects. They believe that the power accorded to the state to detain suspects more easily will lead to more people being falsely identified as terrorist suspects.

== Response ==
=== Open letters from Canadians ===
One hundred law professors have written against the bill. Over 150 Canadian business leaders and followers signed an open letter to the government condemning bill C-51, circulated by OpenMedia.ca.

The Mohawk Council of Kahnawà:ke sent an open letter against the bill writing: "We feel that Bill C-51, in its current state, could potentially and perhaps even predictably be used to future oppress our defense of our Aboriginal rights and Title."

=== Public protest ===
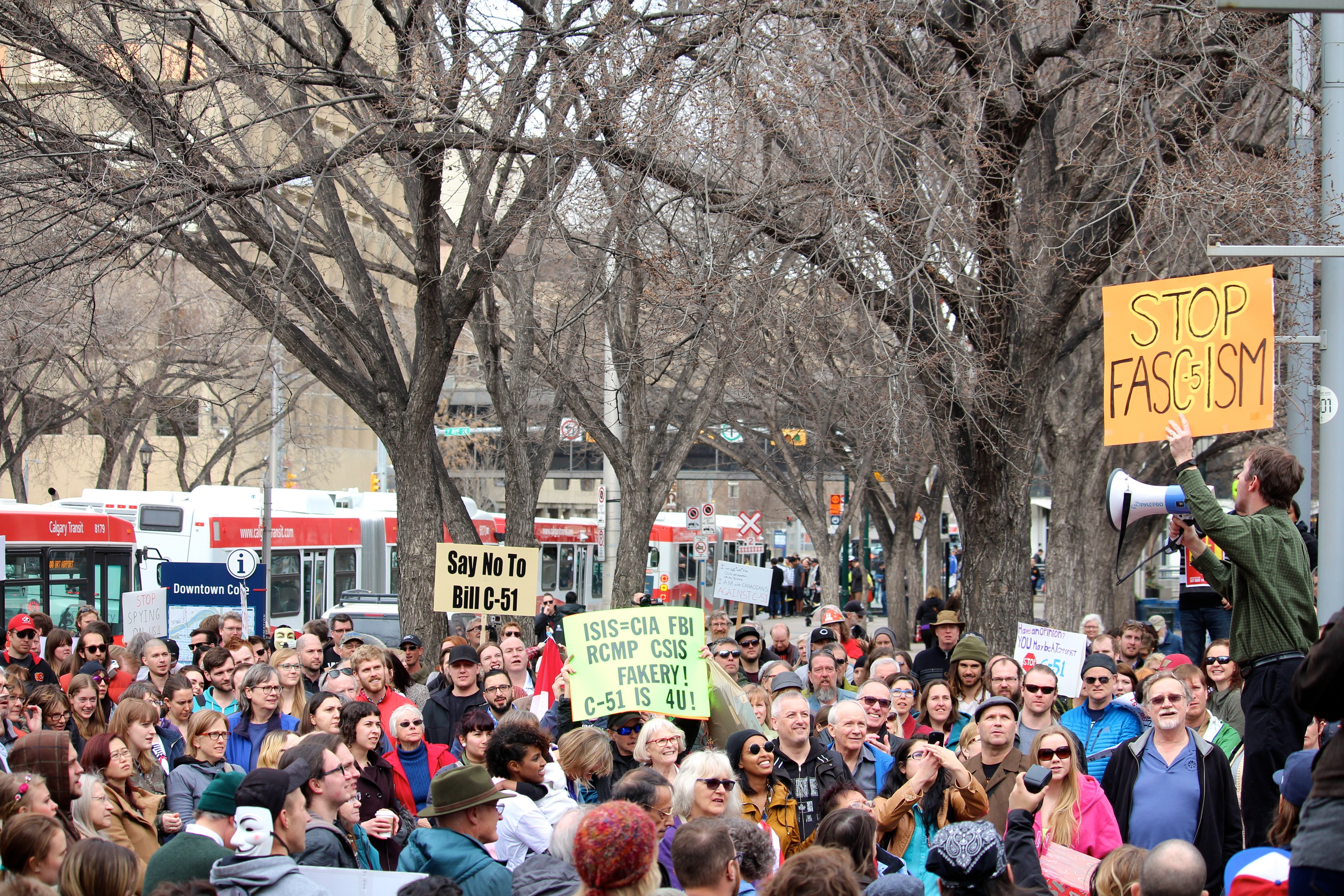
Anti Bill C-51 rally in Calgary

Under the leadership of Paul Finch, the BCGEU called a major anti-C51 rally for Vancouver and began funding LeadNow to organize actions nationally. After a successful post on the social media website Reddit, under the site's subsection /r/Canada, a group of online activists generated another subsection for the organization of protests across the country. Within a few weeks, over 70,000 Canadians spoke out against the bill.

Through 'we.leadnow.ca', forty-five protests occurred across Canada on March 14, which organizers called a Day of Action. The rally drew thousands of demonstrators across fifty-five Canadian cities. NDP leader Thomas Mulcair joined demonstrators in Montreal in a march to Justin Trudeau's office, while Green Party leader Elizabeth May joined the rally in Toronto.

Following the success of Lead Now's national public protest a subsequent grassroots effort led in part by Bowinn Ma led to a second cross-Canada rally effort in opposition of Bill C-51 on April 18. This grassroots effort also mobilized members of the public against Bill C-51 by raising awareness through petition drives and by launching a letter-writing campaign that spread across Canada.

On June 17, the hacker group Anonymous claimed responsibility for a denial of service attack against Canadian government websites, which they said was to protest of the passage of bill C-51. The attack temporarily affected the websites of several federal agencies.

=== Political response ===
The Prime Minister is telling Canadians they need to choose between their security and their rights — that safety and freedom are mutually exclusive. Instead of putting forward concrete measures to make Canadians safer and protect our freedoms, Conservatives have put politics over principle and introduced a bill that is sweeping, dangerously vague, and likely ineffective.

— Thomas Mulcair, Leader of the Official Opposition

On February 4, the Communist Party of Canada began a campaign against Bill C-51 stating they "will do everything in our power to help defeat Bill C-51". On March 4, the party publicly supported the cross-Canada Day of Action against Bill C-51.

On February 17, Elizabeth May, the leader of the Green Party of Canada voiced that she has "a number of concerns with the proposed legislation and wants it scrapped entirely".

On February 18, Tom Mulcair, the leader of the NDP showcased his party's opposition to the bill. During Question Period in the House of Commons, Mulcair stated that Canadians "should not have to choose between security and their rights".

On February 19, a joint statement was published and signed by four former prime ministers: Jean Chrétien, Paul Martin, Joe Clark, and John Turner. Eighteen others signed the statement, including five former Supreme Court justices, seven former Liberal solicitors general and ministers of justice, three past members of the intelligence review committee, two former privacy commissioners and a retired RCMP watchdog. The statement calls for stronger security oversight, as "serious human rights abuses can occur in the name of maintaining national security".

On March 1, the Pirate Party of Canada provided a press release in opposition to the bill, calling for debate, criticism and discussion. Among their criticisms, they believe that the bill is redundant as there are existent laws dealing with terrorists, and this proposal opens the potential for governmental abuse as it "will also allow the government to arrest and incarcerate any citizen based on subjective evidence, then have that evidence destroyed".

On March 6, Daniel Therrien, the privacy commissioner of Canada, stated that the powers of Bill C-51 "are excessive and the privacy safeguards proposed are seriously deficient". He speaks to the potential of limitless powers within the 17 federal agencies that would exist if this bill were to be passed.

On March 8, during an interview on CTV's Question Period, BC Premier Christy Clark expressed opposition to the Bill.

On April 16, Powell River passed a municipal resolution to petition the federal government to withdraw the bill.

== See also ==
- Anti-Terrorism Act (Canada)
- Anti-terrorism legislation
- PROFUNC
- Patriot Act (United States)
