= Pirate Party of Canada =

Pirate Party of Canada Parti Pirate du Canada
- Deregistered federal party
- Leader: Travis McCrea
- President: Bailey Lamon
- Founded: June 12, 2009; 17 years ago
- Dissolved: November 30, 2017; 8 years ago
- Headquarters: 3-212 Henderson Highway, Suite 15. Winnipeg MB R2L 1L8
- Ideology: Pirate politics IP reform Network neutrality Open government Populism; Civil liberties
- Colours: Black and purple (alt: red and white)
- Seats in the House of Commons: 0 / 338
- Seats in the Senate: 0 / 105

Website
- Official website

The Pirate Party of Canada (French: Parti Pirate du Canada; PPCA) was a minor party in federal Canadian politics. Founded in 2009, the party officially registered with Elections Canada in 2010. The PPCA is modelled on the Swedish Pirate Party and advocates intellectual property reform, privacy protection, network neutrality and greater government openness. No member of the party has been elected to Parliament. The party officially deregistered on November 30, 2017.

== Name ==
Companies had labelled people who infringe on copyright as pirates, and we figured since we were going to reform copyright law, we were going to get called pirates anyway, so we were going to adopt the term and make it our own.

— James Wilson, former leader

The Pirate Party drew its inspiration from the Piratpartiet, the Swedish Pirate Party. In 2001, the copyright industry established the Antipiratbyrån—the Anti-Piracy Bureau. In 2003, to combat this legislation, a group of artists, musicians, and cultural workers founded a think-tank called the Piratbyrån—the Piracy Bureau. By selecting that name, the Bureau was signalling that they were the progressive, while the antis were the regressive. In 2005, when copyright laws were harshened again in Sweden, the Bureau established itself as a political party becoming the Pirate Party. Because of past successes of the Bureau, the name immediately conveyed all the political ideas the party stood for. Under that banner, the Pirate Party came 5th in the 2009 European Parliament elections with 7.13% of the vote and 1 MEP, later increasing to 2 after ratification of the Lisbon Treaty, Christian Engström became the first MEP for the party, and Amelia Andersdotter took the second seat on December 1, 2009.

The Canadian Pirate Party was ideologically founded out of that movement, retaining much of the political thought of its parent party.

...we keep our funny name but use it to get the attention to spread to our very important causes.

— Travis McCrea, leader

== Founding and development ==
Former logo of the PPCA

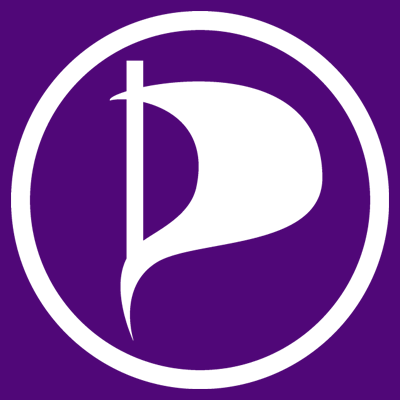
Promotional logo used for the 2015 general election

In June 2009, the PPCA was founded by a handful of Canadian supporters, who were active on the web forums of the Pirate Parties International collective. The party established its own forums and removed membership fees, as part of a campaign to gain the 250 members necessary for registration, gaining 1,000 members by October 2009.

In October 2009, the party selected university student Jacob Daynes as its interim leader and established an interim council. On April 12, 2010, the party was granted official status by Canada's chief electoral officer, Marc Mayrand. On August 19, 2010, the party held its first leadership elections. On September 1, 2010, the party's first Federal Council was elected, with Mikkel Paulson as party leader.

According to Elections Canada, the Pirate Party became eligible to field candidates on April 12, 2010 and was registered on November 6, 2010. As of November 2010, the party claims to have over 2,000 members.

Following the 2011 election, the party examined issues that had arisen with its constitution and began taking steps to reform it. Issues included a hard-to-reach quorum for General Meetings and the difficulties of the Federal Council members running for office while also handling party paperwork and administration. On December 19, the party adopted the new constitution and held elections for the new Executive Board and Political Council.

In June 2012, the party began the process of crowdsourcing its 2015 election platform and opened sections of its forums to guests.

In July 2012, the party allegedly failed to produce its financial report for Elections Canada, citing a changeover of official agents for the party. However, internal party documents demonstrate that the party's membership has been advocating for a public release of the party's financial information since the 2011 federal election. Despite these claims, Elections Canada has all of the party's 'Statements of Assets and Liabilities and Statements of Revenues and Expenses' from 2011 until the present.

== Projects ==
On September 27, 2009, the party launched a BitTorrent tracker, named the "Canadian Pirate Tracker" or "CaPT", with the aim of promoting its position on works being released online.

Pirate Party Radio was a weekly audio show from 2009–2011 produced by the Canadian RantMedia and host James O'Brien. It was recognised by the Pirate Party of Canada, United States Pirate Party and Pirate Party UK. On May 5, 2011 the weekly broadcasts stopped.

In 2011, in response to lawful access legislation that was being put forward in Parliament, the party announced it would launch a VPN service to help guard Canadians' online privacy.

In early 2012, also in response to Bill C-30, several members of the party created a new Linux distro titled Pirate Linux. It is installable as a package on an existing Linux system or as its own distribution based on Ubuntu. It includes many privacy enhancements, including utilizing Tor with browsers preconfigured for its use.

== Political positions ==
Whether you watched a movie at a friend's house that you didn't pay for, or if you borrowed a book, that's essentially what they are calling piracy.

— Mikkel Paulson, former leader

The central principles of the PPCA include the establishment of transparent government, a basic income guarantee, personal autonomy, and traditional Pirate Party ideals such as intellectual property reform, patent reform, net neutrality, and internet privacy. The party explicitly called for net neutrality in Canada, and suggested that medical patents are preventing innovations that could save lives. Candidates have also suggested that making government records available online may encourage transparency, and allow citizens to more directly scrutinize and participate in the process.

Like their Pirate counterparts worldwide, the PPCA is bloc-neutral on other issues, noting that issues outside the party's realm are left to the individual candidate to represent their own constituents' desires.

The PPCA has been heralded by OpenMedia.ca for its "digital policy issues".

The PPCA supports guaranteed minimum income.

On March 1, 2015, the party provided a press release in opposition to Bill C-51, calling for debate, criticism and discussion. Among their criticisms, they believe that the bill is redundant as there are existing laws dealing with terrorists, and this proposal opens the potential for governmental abuse as it "will also allow the government to arrest and incarcerate any citizen based on subjective evidence, then have that evidence destroyed."

== Party governance ==
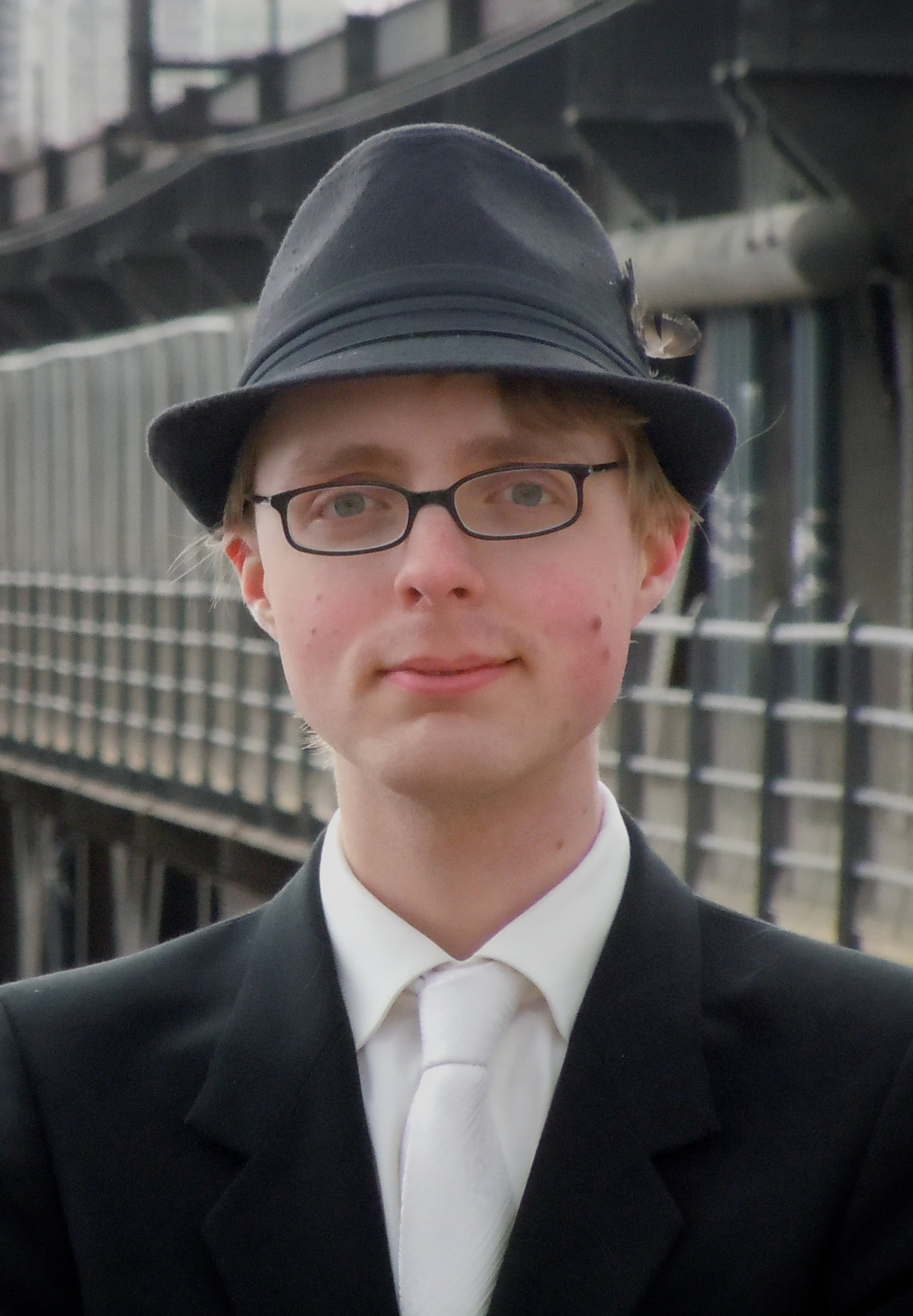
Mikkel Paulson, party leader from 2010–2012

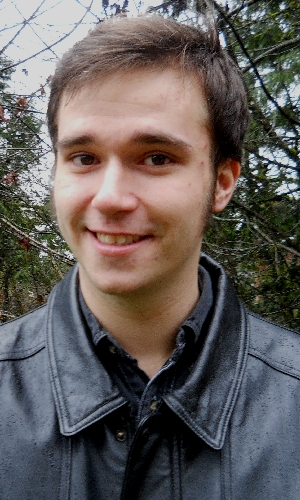
Shawn Vulliez, party leader from 2012–2013; deputy leader 2015–2017

The party is run by three organs of party governance: the Executive Board, the Political Council, and the General Meeting. The Executive Board consists of the president, vice-president, secretary, leader, deputy leader, and chairs of standing committees of the party. The Political Council consists of the leader, deputy leader and other council members elected by approval voting. The General Meeting is open to all members and meets monthly. While the Executive Board and Political Council can act independently in most matters, the General Meeting has veto power over their decisions and may pass their own motions. If a member of the party became elected, that member would become the leader of the party; if multiple members of the party become MPs, the MP who got elected with the highest percentage would become the party leader. This party leader would still be answerable to the party as a whole, and could be replaced by the council.

=== Executive Board ===
Councillor Name	Elected To Board	Position
Bailey Lamon	April 20, 2016	President
Ryan Menchion	April 20, 2016	Vice President
James Phillips	April 20, 2016	Secretary
Travis McCrea	October, 2016	Leader
Shawn Vulliez	April 26, 2016	Deputy Leader

=== Political Council ===
Councillor Name	Elected to Council	Position
Travis McCrea	October, 2016	Party Leader
Shawn Vulliez	March 7, 2016	Deputy Leader
Eric Adriaans	March 7, 2016	Member
Ryan Bromsgrove	March 7, 2016	Member
Travis McCrea	March 7, 2016	Member (now party leader)
Cory Svensson	March 7, 2016	Member

=== Former Pirate Party Leaders ===
- Jacob Daynes (2009–2010)
- Mikkel Paulson (2010–2012)
- Shawn Vulliez (2012–2013)
- Travis McCrea (2013)
- James Wilson (2013–2015)
- Ric Lim (2015–2016)

== Elections ==
Former promotional banner

Results by election
Election	Candidates	Votes	% vote	% vote in contested ridings
2011 general election	10	3,197	0.02%	0.601%
2015 general election	5	906	0.005%	0.323%

=== 2010 by-elections ===
The first federal election contested by the party was the November 2010 by-election in Winnipeg North, finishing ahead of the Communist and Christian Heritage parties, but behind the Green Party.

Jeff Coleman, a 25-year-old small business owner, was the first Pirate Party of Canada candidate to run for federal election.

Riding	Province	Candidate	Votes	%	Placement
Winnipeg North	Manitoba	Jeff Coleman	94	0.60%	5/7

=== 2011 general election ===
For the 2011 federal election, the party put forward candidates in 10 of the 308 ridings but failed to win a seat. The party's candidates received a total of 0.60% the votes in contested ridings (averaging 0.63% per riding). The Langley Times noted that Craig Nobbs ran a zero-dollar campaign. The party's candidates won a total of 3,197 votes.

Riding	Province	Candidate	Votes	%	Placement
Edmonton Centre	Alberta	Mikkel Paulson	289	0.59%	5/6
Edmonton—Mill Woods—Beaumont	Alberta	Brent Schaffrick	374	0.82%	5/6
Langley	British Columbia	Craig Nobbs	353	0.64%	5/5
Nanaimo—Alberni	British Columbia	Jesse Schroeder	363	0.55%	5/7
Prince George—Peace River	British Columbia	Jeremy Coté	415	1.08%	5/5
Vancouver Centre	British Columbia	Travis McCrea	192	0.33%	7/8
Provencher	Manitoba	Ric Lim	215	0.55%	6/6
Kitchener—Waterloo	Ontario	Steven Bradley Scott	245	0.37%	5/7
Ottawa South	Ontario	Mike Bleskie	382	0.65%	6/6
Laval—Les Îles	Quebec	Stéphane Bakhos	369	0.68%	6/7

=== 2013 by-election ===
After Bob Rae resigned as the member for Toronto Centre riding, a by-election was held on November 25, 2013. On August 2, 2013, Travis McCrea announced that he was running in the riding. On October 11, 2013, McCrea stepped down from the leadership of the Pirate Party of Canada, and withdrew his name from the by-election, citing depression.

=== 2015 general election ===
The 42nd federal election was held on October 19, 2015. The PPCA ran five candidates; two each in Alberta and British Columbia, and one in Ontario. James Wilson, a former leader of the party, planned to run in New Brunswick's Fundy Royal riding, but ultimately did not. At the time of the election, Scott Milne ran at the age of eighteen. The party received a total of 906 votes nationally.

Riding	Province	Candidate	Votes	%	Placement
Edmonton Strathcona	Alberta	Ryan Bromsgrove	201	0.36	6/10
Red Deer—Mountain View	Alberta	Scott Milne	312	0.50	6/6
Vancouver East	British Columbia	Shawn Vulliez	188	0.32	8/8
Vancouver Quadra	British Columbia	Trevor Walper	86	0.2	5/7
Parry Sound-Muskoka	Ontario	Duncan Bell	121	0.24	5/7

== Influence ==
It’s pretty funny, given that this very same group of people is working on harsher copyright law with Bill C-11. It just highlights how absurd and unenforceable this copyright monopoly is.

— Travis McCrea, former leader

On January 1, 2012, twelve IP addresses assigned to the Canadian House of Commons were found to have downloaded copyrighted films, music, e-books and software without permission. In the same leak, similar activities were linked to the U.S. House of Representatives and the French President's residence, the Elysees Palace. The discovery was attributed to the PPCA.

== Criticism ==
Green Party of Canada leader Elizabeth May noted that the PPCA seemed redundant, as the two parties shared the majority of their platforms on copyright reform, medical patents and intellectual property; but the PPCA responded that "even if the Green Party had the same stance as us, [...] they were not talking about these issues in the last election; no party was".

David Shipley, an analyst at the University of New Brunswick's Information Technology Services department, has criticized the party for running mostly on Internet-related issues, which may not be enough to garner votes. He is quoted as saying: "How much people decide where they're going to place their vote based on their entertainment preferences, I'm not sure."

Jon Pammett, professor of political science at Carleton University, sees issues with small single-issue parties, like the PPCA. In his opinion the Pirate Party has a larger set of issues than most as they have "picked a set of quite complicated and technical issues, however, and may have some difficulty using the limited attention they get in public campaign events to adequately explain them."

== See also ==
- Pirate Party
- Anti-copyright
- Party for Accountability, Competency and Transparency
