= Andrew Micklefield =

Canadian politician

Member of the Legislative Assembly of Manitoba for Rossmere
- In office April 19, 2016 – September 5, 2023
- Preceded by: Erna Braun
- Succeeded by: Tracy Schmidt

Personal details
- Born: February 28, 1978 (age 48) England
- Party: Progressive Conservative

Andrew Micklefield is a Canadian provincial politician, formerly a member of the Legislative Assembly of Manitoba (MLA) for the riding of Rossmere.

A member of the provincial Progressive Conservative Party, Micklefield was first elected as MLA for Rossmere in the 2016 election, defeating NDP incumbent Erna Braun. On August 24, 2016, Micklefield was appointed as the Government House Leader by Premier Brian Pallister.

He was re-elected in the 2019 provincial election.

== Personal life ==
Andrew Micklefield was born in England and immigrated to Canada in 1989. Living in Winnipeg, Manitoba, he graduated from Transcona Collegiate and holds a Bachelor of Education degree from the University of Winnipeg.

Micklefield has a wife, Ruth, and three children.

== Career ==
Prior to politics, Micklefield was a teacher, with his most recent position being the principal of The King’s School, a private, faith-based school in Winnipeg's East Kildonan neighbourhood. He has also served as a board member of the Manitoba Federation of Independent Schools.

Micklefield ran in the 2016 election as the Progressive Conservative candidate for the riding of Rossmere, where he defeated the NDP incumbent Erna Braun with 53% of the vote. On August 24, 2016, Micklefield was appointed as the Government House Leader by Premier Brian Pallister.

He was re-elected in the 2019 provincial election.

== Electoral record ==
2023 Manitoba general election: Rossmere
Party	Candidate	Votes	%	±%	Expenditures
New Democratic	Tracy Schmidt	4,863	50.74	+11.89	$28,524.95
Progressive Conservative	Andrew Micklefield	4,062	42.38	-4.53	$39,071.53
Liberal	Mike Chapin	478	4.99	-2.65	$0.00
Green	Devlin Hinchey	181	1.89	-4.72	$0.00
Total valid votes/expense limit		9,584	99.21	–	$62,315.00
Total rejected and declined ballots		76	0.79	–	
Turnout		9,660	60.42	+0.80	
Eligible voters		15,989			
New Democratic gain from Progressive Conservative		Swing		+8.21	
Source(s) Source: Elections Manitoba

2019 Manitoba general election: Rossmere
Party	Candidate	Votes	%	±%	Expenditures
Progressive Conservative	Andrew Micklefield	4,369	46.91	-11.7	$29,167.31
New Democratic	Andy Regier	3,618	38.85	+8.2	$13,582.00
Liberal	Isaiah Oyeleru	711	7.63	-0.6	$1,169.32
Green	Amanda Bazan	615	6.60	–	$0.00
Total valid votes		9,313	99.29	–	
Rejected		67	0.71		
Turnout		9,380	59.62		
Eligible voters		15,734			
Progressive Conservative hold		Swing		-10.0	
Source(s) Source: Manitoba. Chief Electoral Officer (2019). Statement of Votes for the 42nd Provincial General Election, September 10, 2019 (PDF) (Report). Winnipeg: Elections Manitoba. "Candidate Election Returns". Elections Manitoba. Elections Manitoba.

2016 Manitoba general election: Rossmere
Party	Candidate	Votes	%	±%	Expenditures
Progressive Conservative	Andrew Micklefield	5,303	53.26	17.26	$36,677.90
New Democratic	Erna Braun	3,389	34.04	-22.55	$37,323.19
Liberal	Malli Aulakh	838	8.42	4.68	$6,822.53
Manitoba	William Sullivan	427	4.29	–	$1,184.93
Total valid votes/expense limit		9,957	–	–	$52,030.00
Rejected		171	–		
Eligible voters / turnout		16,737	60.51	0.44	
Source(s) Source: Manitoba. Chief Electoral Officer (2016). Statement of Votes for the 41st Provincial General Election, April 19, 2016 (PDF) (Report). Winnipeg: Elections Manitoba. "Election Returns: 41st General Election". Elections Manitoba. 2016.
