= Bill C-13 =

Bill C-13 is the name of various legislation introduced into the House of Commons of Canada, including

- Protecting Canadians from Online Crime Act, a framework that empowers Canadian law enforcement and security intelligence agencies
- Bill C-13, As of 2022, the Government of Canada is proposing Bill C-13 which is an update for the Official Languages Act.
