= Rossmere =

Provincial electoral district in Manitoba, Canada

Coordinates: 49.933°N 97.082°W

Manitoba electoral district
- Location in Winnipeg

Provincial electoral district
- Legislature: Legislative Assembly of Manitoba
MLA
Tracy Schmidt
New Democratic
- District created: 1968
- First contested: 1969
- Last contested: 2023

Demographics
- Population (2016): 21,150
- Electors (2019): 15,734
- Area (km²): 12
- Pop. density (per km²): 1,762.5

Rossmere is a provincial electoral district of Manitoba, Canada. It was created by redistribution in 1968, and has formally existed since the provincial election of 1969. The riding is in the northeastern section of the city of Winnipeg.

Rossmere is bordered on the southeast by Radisson, to the south by Elmwood and Concordia, to the north and west by Kildonan-River East.

Rossmere's population in 2018 was 21,150. In 2018, the average family income was $70,969, and the unemployment rate was 6.80%. According to a 2018 boundary commission, 20.8% of the riding's residents were immigrants; 25% listed German as their ethnic origin, and a further 11% are Ukrainian. The aboriginal population was 12.7%.

Rossmere is relatively affluent, and most of its residents are in the middle-income range. There is still a significant working-class presence in the riding, however: 13.8% of the riding's industry is in Health Care & Social Assistance, with a further 10.1% work in the retail trade.

Rossmere's first MLA was the first New Democratic Party premier of Manitoba, Edward Schreyer. It has historically been a swing seat between the NDP and the Progressive Conservatives; the Liberals have only ever placed third here and did not even challenge in 1973. After Schreyer resigned from the Legislative Assembly in 1979, NDP MLA Vic Schroeder succeeded him. Schroeder, who was re-elected in the elections of 1981 and 1986 over Conservative opposition, was a senior cabinet minister in the government of Howard Pawley, but was defeated in the 1988 election that swept the NDP from office. Progressive Conservative Harold Neufeld held the seat from 1988 to 1993, while future MP and federal cabinet minister Vic Toews was the MLA from 1995 to 1999. Both served in the cabinets of Gary Filmon.

For much of the early part of the new millennium, however, the Conservatives were not competitive in the seat. New Democrat Harry Schellenberg, who first won the seat in a 1993 by-election before narrowly losing to Toews in the 1995 provincial election, narrowly defeated Toews in a 1999 rematch. Schellenberg went on to win re-election in the 2003 provincial election with nearly two-thirds of the vote. Schellenberg was succeeded by fellow NDP member Erna Braun, who won the seat in 2007 provincial election with 60% of the vote. Notably, the Conservatives did not nominate a candidate until after the election was called. The Tories took back the seat amid the massive Tory wave that swept through the province in 2016, with Andrew Micklefield defeating Braun by a nearly 2-to-1 margin.

A political bellwether, Rossmere has voted for the party that has won every general election since its creation except 1977.

== Members of the Legislative Assembly ==
This riding has elected the following MLAs:

Parliament	Years	Member	Party
Riding created from Brokenhead, Kildonan and Radisson
26th	1969–1973	Edward Schreyer	New Democratic
27th	1973–1977	Edward Schreyer	New Democratic
28th	1977–1979	Edward Schreyer	New Democratic
28th	1979–1981	Victor Schroeder	New Democratic
29th	1981–1986	Victor Schroeder	New Democratic
30th	1986–1988	Victor Schroeder	New Democratic
31st	1988–1990	Harold Neufeld	Progressive Conservative
32nd	1990–1993	Harold Neufeld	Progressive Conservative
32nd	1993–1995	Harry Schellenberg	New Democratic
33rd	1995–1999	Vic Toews	Progressive Conservative
34th	1999–2003	Harry Schellenberg	New Democratic
35th	2003–2007	Harry Schellenberg	New Democratic
36th	2007–2011	Erna Braun	New Democratic
37th	2011–2016	Erna Braun	New Democratic
38th	2016–2019	Andrew Micklefield	Progressive Conservative
39th	2019–2023	Andrew Micklefield	Progressive Conservative
40th	2023–present	Tracy Schmidt	New Democratic

== Electoral results ==
=== 2023 ===
2023 Manitoba general election
Party	Candidate	Votes	%	±%	Expenditures
New Democratic	Tracy Schmidt	4,863	50.74	+11.89	$28,524.95
Progressive Conservative	Andrew Micklefield	4,062	42.38	-4.53	$39,071.53
Liberal	Mike Chapin	478	4.99	-2.65	$0.00
Green	Devlin Hinchey	181	1.89	-4.72	$0.00
Total valid votes/expense limit		9,584	99.21	–	$62,315.00
Total rejected and declined ballots		76	0.79	–	
Turnout		9,660	60.42	+0.80	
Eligible voters		15,989			
New Democratic gain from Progressive Conservative		Swing		+8.21	
Source(s) Source: Elections Manitoba

=== 2019 ===
2019 Manitoba general election
Party	Candidate	Votes	%	±%	Expenditures
Progressive Conservative	Andrew Micklefield	4,369	46.91	-11.7	$29,167.31
New Democratic	Andy Regier	3,618	38.85	+8.2	$13,582.00
Liberal	Isaiah Oyeleru	711	7.63	-0.6	$1,169.32
Green	Amanda Bazan	615	6.60	–	$0.00
Total valid votes		9,313	99.29	–	
Rejected		67	0.71		
Turnout		9,380	59.62		
Eligible voters		15,734			
Progressive Conservative hold		Swing		-10.0	
Source(s) Source: Manitoba. Chief Electoral Officer (2019). Statement of Votes for the 42nd Provincial General Election, September 10, 2019 (PDF) (Report). Winnipeg: Elections Manitoba. "Candidate Election Returns". Elections Manitoba. Elections Manitoba.

=== 2016 ===
2016 provincial election redistributed results
Party	%
Progressive Conservative	58.6
New Democratic	30.6
Liberal	8.2
Manitoba	2.6

2016 Manitoba general election
Party	Candidate	Votes	%	±%	Expenditures
Progressive Conservative	Andrew Micklefield	5,303	53.26	17.26	$36,677.90
New Democratic	Erna Braun	3,389	34.04	-22.55	$37,323.19
Liberal	Malli Aulakh	838	8.42	4.68	$6,822.53
Manitoba	William Sullivan	427	4.29	–	$1,184.93
Total valid votes/expense limit		9,957	–	–	$52,030.00
Rejected		171	–		
Eligible voters / turnout		16,737	60.51	0.44	
Source(s) Source: Manitoba. Chief Electoral Officer (2016). Statement of Votes for the 41st Provincial General Election, April 19, 2016 (PDF) (Report). Winnipeg: Elections Manitoba. "Election Returns: 41st General Election". Elections Manitoba. 2016.

=== 2011 ===
2011 Manitoba general election
Party	Candidate	Votes	%	±%	Expenditures
New Democratic	Erna Braun	5,392	56.59	-4.12	$27,418.97
Progressive Conservative	Kaur "Karl" Sidhu	3,430	36.00	3.26	$32,542.12
Liberal	Rene Belliveau	356	3.74	-2.82	$356.05
Green	Evan Maydaniuk	351	3.68	–	$618.03
Total valid votes		9,529	–	–	
Rejected		35	–		
Eligible voters / turnout		15,921	60.07	-1.63	
Source(s) Source: Manitoba. Chief Electoral Officer (2011). Statement of Votes for the 40th Provincial General Election, October 4, 2011 (PDF) (Report). Winnipeg: Elections Manitoba. "Election Returns: 40th General Election". Elections Manitoba. 2011.

=== 2007 ===
2007 Manitoba general election
Party	Candidate	Votes	%	±%	Expenditures
New Democratic	Erna Braun	4,836	60.71	-4.84	$28,754.31
Progressive Conservative	Cathy Cox	2,608	32.74	2.98	$18,967.41
Liberal	Isaiah Oyeleru	522	6.55	1.86	$1,792.15
Total valid votes		7,966	–	–	
Rejected		43	–		
Eligible voters / turnout		12,980	61.70	3.48	
Source(s) Source: Manitoba. Chief Electoral Officer (2007). Statement of Votes for the 39th Provincial General Election, May 22, 2007 (PDF) (Report). Winnipeg: Elections Manitoba.

=== 2003 ===
2003 Manitoba general election
Party	Candidate	Votes	%	±%	Expenditures
New Democratic	Harry Schellenberg	5,057	65.55	16.34	$22,387.56
Progressive Conservative	Virginia Larsson	2,296	29.76	-16.61	$11,745.51
Liberal	Sam Bhalesar	362	4.69	0.87	$67.50
Total valid votes		7,715	–	–	
Rejected		35	–		
Eligible voters / Turnout		13,311	58.22	-21.25	
Source(s) Source: Manitoba. Chief Electoral Officer (2003). Statement of Votes for the 38th Provincial General Election, June 3, 2003 (PDF) (Report). Winnipeg: Elections Manitoba.

=== 1999 ===
1999 Manitoba general election
Party	Candidate	Votes	%	±%	Expenditures
New Democratic	Harry Schellenberg	5,097	49.21	4.49	$25,409.00
Progressive Conservative	Vic Toews	4,803	46.37	0.40	$30,765.70
Liberal	Cecilia Connelly	396	3.82	-5.49	$766.92
Libertarian	Chris Buors	62	0.60	–	$353.40
Total valid votes		10,358	–	–	
Rejected		54	–		
Eligible voters / turnout		13,102	79.47	2.39	
Source(s) Source: Manitoba. Chief Electoral Officer (1999). Statement of Votes for the 37th Provincial General Election, September 21, 1999 (PDF) (Report). Winnipeg: Elections Manitoba.

=== 1995 ===
1995 Manitoba general election
Party	Candidate	Votes	%	±%	Expenditures
Progressive Conservative	Vic Toews	4,318	45.97	14.79	$20,855.00
New Democratic	Harry Schellenberg	4,201	44.72	1.53	$22,807.00
Liberal	Cecilia Connelly	875	9.31	-13.63	$6,262.74
Total valid votes		9,394	–	–	
Rejected		37	–		
Eligible voters / turnout		12,235	77.08	–	
Source(s) Source: Manitoba. Chief Electoral Officer (1999). Statement of Votes for the 37th Provincial General Election, September 21, 1999 (PDF) (Report). Winnipeg: Elections Manitoba.

=== 1993 by-election ===
Manitoba provincial by-election, September 21, 1993 Resignation of Harold Neufeld
Party	Candidate	Votes	%	±%
New Democratic	Harry Schellenberg	2,987	43.19	13.56
Progressive Conservative	Edward John "Ed" Martens	2,156	31.17	-11.15
Liberal	Sherry Wiebe	1,587	22.95	-3.32
Independent	Cynthia Cooke	186	2.69	–
Total valid votes		6,916	–	–
Rejected		N/A	–	
Eligible voters / Turnout		N/A	–	–
Source(s) Source: Manitoba. Chief Electoral Officer (1999). Statement of Votes for the 37th Provincial General Election, September 21, 1999 (PDF) (Report). Winnipeg: Elections Manitoba.

=== 1990 ===
1990 Manitoba general election
Party	Candidate	Votes	%	±%
Progressive Conservative	Harold Neufeld	3,893	42.33	4.24
New Democratic	Maxine Hamilton	2,725	29.63	-3.39
Liberal	Terry Duguid	2,416	26.27	-1.22
Western Independence	Katharina Cameron	163	1.77	0.36
Total valid votes		9,197	–	–
Rejected		25	–	
Eligible voters / Turnout		12,385	74.46	-9.17
Source(s) Source: Manitoba. Chief Electoral Officer (1999). Statement of Votes for the 37th Provincial General Election, September 21, 1999 (PDF) (Report). Winnipeg: Elections Manitoba.

=== 1988 ===
1988 Manitoba general election
Party	Candidate	Votes	%	±%
Progressive Conservative	Harold Neufeld	3,950	38.09	-3.58
New Democratic	Vic Schroeder	3,424	33.02	-14.02
Liberal	Cecilia Connelly	2,851	27.49	16.19
Western Independence	Chris Dondo	146	1.41	–
Total valid votes		10,371	–	–
Rejected		23	–	
Eligible voters / Turnout		12,429	83.63	5.72
Source(s) Source: Manitoba. Chief Electoral Officer (1999). Statement of Votes for the 37th Provincial General Election, September 21, 1999 (PDF) (Report). Winnipeg: Elections Manitoba.

=== 1986 ===
1986 Manitoba general election
Party	Candidate	Votes	%	±%
New Democratic	Vic Schroeder	4,613	47.04	-7.45
Progressive Conservative	Harold Neufeld	4,086	41.66	1.16
Liberal	Cecilia Connelly	1,108	11.30	7.63
Total valid votes		9,807	–	–
Rejected		20	–	
Eligible voters / Turnout		12,614	77.91	-4.23
Source(s) Source: Manitoba. Chief Electoral Officer (1999). Statement of Votes for the 37th Provincial General Election, September 21, 1999 (PDF) (Report). Winnipeg: Elections Manitoba.

=== 1981 ===
1981 Manitoba general election
Party	Candidate	Votes	%	±%
New Democratic	Vic Schroeder	5,776	54.49	5.88
Progressive Conservative	Ian Sutherland	4,293	40.50	-6.31
Liberal	Bill deJong	389	3.67	-0.44
Progressive	Merv Unger	142	1.34	–
Total valid votes		10,600	–	–
Rejected		19	–	
Eligible voters / Turnout		12,928	82.14	–
Source(s) Source: Manitoba. Chief Electoral Officer (1999). Statement of Votes for the 37th Provincial General Election, September 21, 1999 (PDF) (Report). Winnipeg: Elections Manitoba.

=== 1979 by-election ===
Manitoba provincial by-election, October 16, 1979 Resignation of Edward Schreyer
Party	Candidate	Votes	%	±%
New Democratic	Vic Schroeder	6,191	48.61	-1.52
Progressive Conservative	Harold Piercy	5,961	46.81	0.63
Liberal	E. J. "Sandy" Clancy	523	4.11	0.42
Western Democracy	Linda J. Penner	39	0.31	–
Marxist–Leninist	Manual Gitterman	21	0.16	–
Total valid votes		12,735	–	–
Rejected		N/A	–	
Eligible voters / Turnout		N/A	–	–
Source(s) Source: Manitoba. Chief Electoral Officer (1999). Statement of Votes for the 37th Provincial General Election, September 21, 1999 (PDF) (Report). Winnipeg: Elections Manitoba.

=== 1977 ===
1977 Manitoba general election
Party	Candidate	Votes	%	±%
New Democratic	Edward Schreyer	9,246	50.14	-2.11
Progressive Conservative	Henry Krahn	8,516	46.18	-1.57
Liberal	Brian Norris	680	3.69	–
Total valid votes		18,442	–	–
Rejected		38	–	
Eligible voters / Turnout		22,189	83.28	-2.06
Source(s) Source: Manitoba. Chief Electoral Officer (1999). Statement of Votes for the 37th Provincial General Election, September 21, 1999 (PDF) (Report). Winnipeg: Elections Manitoba.

=== 1973 ===
1973 Manitoba general election
Party	Candidate	Votes	%	±%
New Democratic	Edward Schreyer	6,827	52.25	-8.74
Progressive Conservative	Alfred Penner	6,239	47.75	21.71
Total valid votes		13,066	–	–
Rejected		49	–	
Eligible voters / Turnout		15,367	85.35	16.53
Source(s) Source: Manitoba. Chief Electoral Officer (1999). Statement of Votes for the 37th Provincial General Election, September 21, 1999 (PDF) (Report). Winnipeg: Elections Manitoba.

=== 1969 ===
1969 Manitoba general election
Party	Candidate	Votes	%
New Democratic	Edward Schreyer	4,089	60.99
Progressive Conservative	David Wilfred Pekary	1,746	26.04
Liberal	Vern Breckman	631	9.41
Independent	Stanley Copp	238	3.55
Total valid votes		6,704	–
Rejected		19	–
Eligible voters / Turnout		9,770	68.81
Source(s) Source: Manitoba. Chief Electoral Officer (1999). Statement of Votes for the 37th Provincial General Election, September 21, 1999 (PDF) (Report). Winnipeg: Elections Manitoba.

== See also ==
- List of Manitoba provincial electoral districts
- Canadian provincial electoral districts
