= Vic Toews =

Canadian politician (born 1952)

The Honourable Vic Toews PC KC
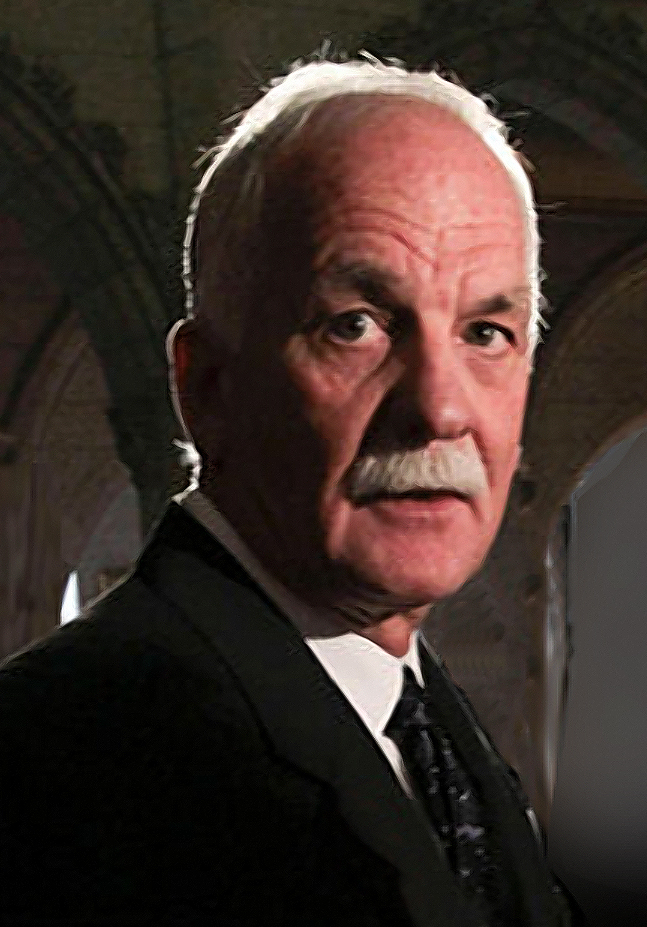

Minister of Public Safety
- In office January 19, 2010 – July 9, 2013
- Prime Minister: Stephen Harper
- Preceded by: Peter Van Loan
- Succeeded by: Steven Blaney

Minister of Justice Attorney General of Canada
- In office February 6, 2006 – January 4, 2007
- Prime Minister: Stephen Harper
- Preceded by: Irwin Cotler
- Succeeded by: Rob Nicholson

President of the Treasury Board
- In office January 4, 2007 – January 19, 2010
- Prime Minister: Stephen Harper
- Preceded by: John Baird
- Succeeded by: Stockwell Day

Member of Parliament for Provencher
- In office November 27, 2000 – July 9, 2013
- Preceded by: David Iftody
- Succeeded by: Ted Falk

Member of the Manitoba Legislative Assembly for Rossmere
- In office April 25, 1995 – September 21, 1999
- Preceded by: Harry Schellenberg
- Succeeded by: Harry Schellenberg

Personal details
- Born: Victor Toews; September 10, 1952 (age 74) Filadelfia, Paraguay
- Party: Conservative (2003–present)
- Other political affiliations: Progressive Conservative (provincial; 1989-2000); Alliance (2000–2003)
- Spouse: Lorraine Toews (div. 2008)
- Education: University of Winnipeg; University of Manitoba
- Profession: Counsel; Crown attorney

Victor Toews PC KC (/ˈteɪvz/; born September 10, 1952) is a Canadian politician and jurist. Toews is a justice of the Court of King's Bench of Manitoba. He represented Provencher in the House of Commons of Canada from 2000 until his resignation on July 9, 2013, and served in the cabinet of Prime Minister Stephen Harper, most recently as Minister of Public Safety. He previously served in the Legislative Assembly of Manitoba from 1995 to 1999, and was a senior cabinet minister in the government of Gary Filmon. Prior to his appointment to the judiciary, Toews was a member of the Conservative Party of Canada.

== Personal life ==
Toews was born September 10, 1952, in Filadelfia, Boquerón Department, Paraguay, to Mennonite Canadian parents. His father, Victor David Toews, was a Reverend who was teaching in the Fernheim Mennonite Colony with Toews mother, Anna Peters. In 1920, his paternal great-grandparents were killed in a bomb blast during the Russian Civil War after the Russian Revolution. Vic Toews has five siblings: Bernhard, Clara, Marlene, Edward, and Esther. His family left Paraguay in 1956 for Canada and settled in Winnipeg, Manitoba.

Toews speaks Mennonite Low German (his mother tongue), Spanish and English. He holds a Bachelor of Arts degree in History from the University of Winnipeg (1973), and a Bachelor of Laws degree from the University of Manitoba (1976). Toews was called to the Manitoba Bar in 1977. He joined the provincial Ministry of Justice in 1976 and became a Crown attorney the following year.

=== Divorce ===
Toews divorced from his wife of 30 years, Lorraine Kathleen Fehr, after it was discovered that he had fathered a child with a young Conservative Party staffer. In divorce documents, Fehr claimed Toews had a much earlier relationship with the family's child care provider. This incident later became publicized in February 2012, when an anonymous Twitter account (later discovered to be a Liberal Party staffer) began posting information from Toews' divorce affidavit (that were on the public record, filed with the Court of Queen's Bench of Manitoba) as reaction to the introduction of Bill-30.

=== Conviction ===
In 2005, Toews was charged with violating Manitoba's Election Finances Act in the 1999 provincial election. During the election cycle, it was discovered that his election campaign had spent $7,500 more than the allowed limit. Toews pleaded guilty, and was later convicted and fined $500.

== Provincial politics ==
Toews joined the Progressive Conservative Party of Manitoba in 1989, winning a seat in the 1995 election, by narrowly defeating NDP incumbent Harry Schellenberg in the north Winnipeg riding of Rossmere. In 1999, the Progressive Conservatives were defeated in the 1999 provincial election and Toews himself lost to Schellenberg in a rematch.

=== Minister of Labour ===
Toews was appointed to the cabinet of Premier Gary Filmon after the election, becoming Minister of Labour on May 9, 1995. In his debut speech to the legislature, he said that his political philosophy was partly influenced by leaders of Canada's social democratic movement, as well as his own Mennonite upbringing.

Toews's tenure as Labour Minister was marked by a difficult relationship with organized labour. His first major legislative initiative was Bill 26 (1996), which required unions to disclose the salaries of their officials and indicate how membership dues were spent, mandated union certification votes to take place within seven days of an application, and granted employees the right to prevent their dues from being donated to political parties. Several labour leaders described the bill as anti-union. NDP leader Gary Doer argued that the provision regarding donations unfairly targeted his party, and suggested that corporate shareholders should be given the same right to shield their investments from party donations. Toews rejected these criticisms, and argued that Bill 26 provided greater autonomy to individual workers.

Toews's department proposed the privatization of home-care delivery services in 1996, drawing opposition from many in the field and triggering an extended strike. He was also forced to deal with strikes at Boeing, Inco, and the Manitoba Lotteries Corporation, leading one journalist to describe 1996 as "the busiest year for picketing since the 1919 Winnipeg General Strike". Toews blamed unions for provoking the strikes, saying they were conducted "for political, not economic, reasons."

Toews cancelled the provincial Payment of Wages Fund in July 1996, argued that it was not achieving its purpose. The stated intention of the fund was to allow workers to collect revenues from employers who entered bankruptcy or receivership.

=== Minister of Justice ===
On January 6, 1997, Toews was promoted to Minister of Justice, Attorney General and Keeper of the Great Seal, with further responsibility for Constitutional Affairs.

==== Approach to crime and the judiciary ====
As Justice Minister, Toews earned a reputation for focusing on "law and order" issues. One of his first ministerial decisions was to grant jail superintendents the right to institute complete smoking bans, impose random drug tests, and monitor prisoners' calls. In August 1998, Toews announced that his ministry would hire more Crown attorneys and construct more than seventy new beds for the Headingley Correctional Institution, in an attempt to incarcerate more dangerous offenders.

Toews also introduced legislation to make parents legally responsible for the crimes of their children. Members of the opposition New Democratic Party argued that the plan would be ineffective, citing past experiments in the United States as evidence.

Toews criticized some criminal justice initiatives brought forward by the federal government of Jean Chrétien. In 1997, he announced that Manitoba would not enforce or administer the Canadian gun registry. Two years later, he described changes to the federal Young Offenders Act as both ineffective and too expensive. Toews nonetheless cooperated with the federal government on several issues. In March 1998, he stood with federal cabinet minister Lloyd Axworthy to announce a plan discouraging court sentences for non-violent aboriginal offenders. Toews said that the proposal was "sensitive to the needs of the aboriginal community", and that it would reduce the number of repeat offenders.

Toews's relationship with the judiciary was sometimes difficult. In May 1998, he asked a judicial appointment committee to add two names to a list of proposed judges. Some argued that this was improper interference, while Toews stated that he acted to ensure the appointment of more bilingual judges. In 1999, he delivered a speech to the Alberta Summit on Justice that criticized judges for intervening in political matters. He was quoted as saying that judges, unlike parliamentarians, "are not well-placed to understand and represent the social, economic and political values of the public". Some attendees criticized his speech, and a representative of the Legal Aid Society of Alberta described it as "inflammatory and sensational". Toews stated on another occasion that judges have a relatively light workload. Chief Provincial Justice Judith Webster described this as "misleading and inaccurate".

In May 1999, Toews announced that Manitoba would accept a Supreme Court of Canada decision granting spousal benefits to same-sex couples.

=== Opposition criticism ===
The New Democrats argued that Crown offices were underfunded under Toews' watch, and suggested that the Justice Department's prosecutorial duties were compromised.

During a legislative debate in June 1999, Toews accused NDP Justice Critic Gord Mackintosh of mischief for repeatedly calling the province's Street Peace gang hotline only to hang up before leaving a message. Calls to the hotline were meant to be confidential and anonymous, but Toews later acknowledged that calls from government buildings had been tracked and that he received Mackintosh's name from an employee in his department. Premier Filmon described Toews's conduct in the matter as inappropriate. During the fallout from this controversy, Toews was forced to admit that the hotline had gone unanswered for several months.

== Federal politics ==
=== Party alignment ===
After leaving provincial politics, Toews turned his attention to the federal scene and Canada's "unite-the-right" movement. He had been a supporter of the Progressive Conservative Party of Canada for decades federally. Although he did not endorse the United Alternative initiative when it was first announced in 1999, he began calling for cooperation between the Tories and the right-wing Reform Party of Canada. He expressed interest in working with the Canadian Alliance, a successor to the Reform Party that sought to build support among Blue Tory Progressive Conservatives. Toews endorsed Tom Long's bid for the Alliance leadership in June 2000, and approved of Brian Pallister's efforts to bring the Progressive Conservatives into cooperation with the new party.

Toews formally joined the Alliance in the buildup to the 2000 federal election, and defeated four other candidates to win the party's nomination in Provencher, a primarily rural riding in southeastern Manitoba. The riding was held by Liberal incumbent David Iftody, but had elected conservative candidates in the past. Toews defeated Iftody with a nearly 7,000-vote margin in the general election. The Liberals won a national majority government, and Toews was appointed as Justice Critic in the opposition shadow cabinet.

The Canadian Alliance was weakened by internal divisions in mid-2001, with several MPs calling on party leader Stockwell Day to resign. Toews did not take a strong position for or against Day's leadership, but issued a call for party discipline pending a formal review. When Day resigned, Toews worked on Grant Hill's unsuccessful campaign to become the new party leader.

In 2003, Toews recommended that Alliance members purchase Progressive Conservative membership cards to support the leadership bid of Jim Prentice. He denied this constituted interference, and said that members of the two parties should be encouraged to work together.

=== Conservative MP ===
After the Canadian Alliance and Progressive Conservative parties merged to form the Conservative Party of Canada in 2003, Toews joined the new party, and was a Manitoba organizer in Stephen Harper's successful bid to become its first elected leader. He returned to office in the 2004 federal election as the Liberals were reduced to a minority government, and was retained as Justice Critic in the parliament that followed.

On January 25, 2005, Toews pleaded guilty to the charge of exceeding his personal campaign expense limits in the 1999 provincial election. He claimed that the overspending resulted from a miscommunication between his campaign and the provincial party as to how some expenses were to be accounted. There were some calls for him to resign as Justice Critic, but nothing came of this. Toews received a $500 fine, and the charge remained on his record.

A Winnipeg Free Press poll taken in late December 2005 showed Toews as the most popular choice to replace Stuart Murray as leader of the Manitoba Progressive Conservatives. He declined to contest the position, and was returned without difficulty in the 2006 Canadian federal election.

=== Policy views ===
As Justice Critic from 2001 to 2005, Toews frequently accused the Liberal government of being unfocused on crime issues. He supported the Chrétien government's decision to create a national sex offender registry in 2002, but criticized the government for not making the bill retroactive to include the names of previously convicted offenders. The non-retroactive approach followed the model of previous legislation in the United Kingdom.

Toews criticized some Supreme Court decisions, and on one occasion accused former Chief Justice Antonio Lamer of overseeing a "frenzy of constitutional experimentation". He also called for official reviews of judicial appointments, arguing that the policy views of judges should be known before they take office. In September 2004, he delivered a speech to the National Pro-Life Conference entitled "Abuse of the Charter by the Supreme Court". In this speech, Toews criticized judicial implementation of the Charter of Rights and Freedoms, suggested that judges were implementing social policy, and called on his audience to build organizations to challenge the courts.

Toews spoke favourably of the Charter of Rights and Freedoms on its twentieth anniversary in 2002, describing it as "a powerful check on the power of government to unreasonably intrude on our rights and freedoms". He also called for governments to demonstrate more willingness to use the Charter's Notwithstanding Clause to overrule court decisions. Toews specifically argued that the clause should have been used to overturn a court decision that he claimed weakened Canada's child pornography laws. (The Liberal government brought forward remedial legislation to address this decision, without resorting to a Constitutional strategy.)

Initially considered a moderate within the Canadian Alliance, Toews later became known for endorsing socially conservative causes. He was a vocal opponent of Bill C-250 (2003), which made sexual orientation a protected category under Canada's hate crime legislation. Toews stated that the bill could restrict freedom of expression and religion, and was quoted as saying that a "homosexual activist" could sue a hotel chain to remove Bibles as hate literature. He later emerged as a prominent opponent of same-sex marriage, and suggested that changing the definition of marriage in Canada could result in polygamy being legalized. In 2005, he launched an extended filibuster to delay committee work on the issue. Despite his efforts, same-sex marriage was legalized in the summer of 2005.

During this period, Toews also argued that religious organizations should be permitted to deny gay organizations the use of their facilities, supported increasing the age of sexual consent in Canada from fourteen to sixteen, and opposed the decriminalization of cannabis. He continued to oppose the federal gun registry.

=== Federal Minister of Justice ===
The Conservatives won a minority government in the 2006 election. On February 6, 2006, Prime Minister Stephen Harper appointed Toews to cabinet as Canada's Minister of Justice and Attorney-General.

In mid-2006, Toews's department prepared draft legislation concerning religious rights and freedom of speech in relation to same-sex marriage. Some speculated that this legislation was intended to protect the "free speech" of religious leaders and others who criticize homosexual behaviour. The legislation was never brought forward. The House of Commons defeated a motion to reopen the debate on same-sex marriage in December 2006. While Toews remains personally opposed to same-sex marriage, he later indicated that the Harper government would not revisit the issue again.

In late October 2006, an Ontario Superior Court Judge struck down a part of Canada's Security of Information Act as unconstitutional. This law had previously been used by the Royal Canadian Mounted Police to obtain search warrants for the home and office of Ottawa journalist Juliet O'Neill, after she received and published leaked information about Maher Arar. In the same week, an Ottawa judge struck down as unconstitutional a section of the Anti-terrorism Act that defined terrorism as crime motived by religion, politics or ideology. Toews later announced that the Harper government would not appeal the O'Neill decision.

In December 2006, Toews and Minister of Indian Affairs and Northern Development Jim Prentice announced plans to repeal Section 67 of the Canadian Human Rights Act. The ministers argued that this provision sometimes prevented status aboriginals and on-reserve workers from registering human rights complaints, and said that its repeal would extend full rights protection to all First Nations people.

Toews called a judicial inquiry into the 1985 Air India bombing in February 2006. He abolished the Law Commission of Canada later in the year, saying that the government would commission other agencies to do its research work.

==== Criminal justice ====
Gun-related crimes

Toews introduced two bills in May 2006, requiring mandatory minimum prison sentences for persons convicted of gun crimes and eliminating house arrest as an option for various offenses. Opposition parties amended the second bill in October 2006, retaining the ban on house arrests for serious violent and sexual offenders but permitting it for non-violent property offenders. NDP Justice Critic Joe Comartin argued that this change addressed the legitimate concerns of Canadians, while removing what he described as "the radical, extreme over-reaction" of the Conservatives. Toews called for the bill to be passed in its original form.

In November 2006, Toews introduced a bill to toughen bail conditions for persons accused of gun-related crimes. The bill included a "reverse-onus" clause requiring the accused to demonstrate why they should not be held in custody. Ontario Premier Dalton McGuinty and Toronto Mayor David Miller indicated their support for the bill.

Age of consent

In June 2006, Toews introduced a Bill C-2 to raise the age of sexual consent from fourteen to sixteen. The bill included an exemption for adolescents who have relations with persons no more than five years older than themselves. Under Canadian law, "sexual consent" covers all activities from kissing to intercourse. Liberal MP Irwin Cotler argued that the Conservative Party was misrepresenting the issue to the Canadian public, and noted that the sexual exploitation of persons under eighteen is already illegal under Canadian law. Toews's proposed changes were supported by other interested parties, including Manitoba Justice Minister Gord Mackintosh. The bill became law in February 2008, over a year after Toews left the Justice portfolio.

Dangerous offender status

Toews introduced a "three strikes" bill to the House of Commons in October 2006, stipulating that persons found guilty of three sexual or violent crimes will be automatically categorized as dangerous offenders unless they can convince a judge otherwise. Persons labeled as dangerous offenders under Canadian law may be kept in prison indefinitely. Critics argued that the proposed law was too broad in its scope, and included vaguely defined categories in its list of serious offenses. Civil libertarian groups also argued that the bill threatened the constitutional principle of accused persons being presumed innocent until proven guilty, and suggested that it may not withstand a court challenge.

Youth justice

In August 2006, Toews told reporters that he was willing to consider lowering the age of criminal responsibility in Canada from twelve to ten. He indicated that his focus was on treatment rather than jail time, although he did not rule out jail sentences for ten-year-olds. A Justice Department spokesman later clarified that there were no plans to bring forward such legislation. In October 2006, Toews announced plans to introduce more severe sentencing provisions under the Youth Criminal Justice Act.

Other

In June 2006, Toews brought forward amendments to expand Canada's collection of DNA samples from convicted criminals, and later proposed amendments to ensure convicted sex offenders are automatically included in this registry. He also confirmed that his government would arm guards at the Canada-United States border, and would not revive plans by the previous Liberal administration to decriminalize simple possession of cannabis.

MPs from all parties agreed to fast-track passage of a bill toughening penalties for street racing in November 2006. In the same month, Toews introduced a bill to give the police extra powers against persons who drive while under the influence of drugs.

===== Criticism =====
Some provincial justice ministers expressed concern about the costs of Toews's proposed sentencing reforms. Toews acknowledged that his government's gun sentencing laws would cost $246 million per year for new prison space and $40 million for operating costs, but argued that the changes were necessary and were requested by police and provincial officials.

Liberal MP Michael Ignatieff criticized Toews's approach to crime, arguing that adding thousands of people to Canada's prison system will lead to young offenders becoming hardened adult criminals, and will not make Canada safer in the long term. Former Ontario Chief Justice Patrick LeSage also criticized Toews's approach to crime issues, arguing that the country was not experiencing a crime wave and did not need "draconian" laws to ensure its safety.

===== Judicial appointments =====
Soon after he assumed office, Toews announced that public hearings would be held for the next justice appointed to the Supreme Court of Canada. This policy was criticized by Supreme Court Chief Justice Beverley McLachlin and former justice John Major, who expressed concern that these hearings could foment the "political warfare" associated with American judicial appointments. In late February, Prime Minister Harper nominated Marshall Rothstein from a shortlist prepared by the previous Liberal administration. MPs were permitted to ask questions of Rothstein, although the ultimate power of appointment continued to rest with the prime minister. Rothstein was supported by Liberal members of the judicial committee, and was quickly confirmed to the bench.

In November 2006, Toews announced that police representatives would be appointed to the provincial judicial advisory committees that review the qualifications of potential judges. This proposal was widely criticized by the Canadian media and by opposition MPs, some of whom argued that Toews's intent was to stack the courts with right-wing judges. In an unprecedented move, Chief Justice Beverley McLachlin and the Canadian Judicial Council issued a statement that Toews's proposal would "compromise the independence of the Advisory Committees", and called for the minister to consult with judicial and legal representatives before making any changes. The Federation of Law Societies of Canada has also criticized Toews's plan, arguing that the government had "politicized" the judicial appointments process. Ontario Chief Justice Roy McMurtry and Attorney General Michael Bryant added their opposition in early 2007, with Bryant arguing that "the forces of legal populism" were threatening to "tear asunder the basic principle of judicial independence". Toews indicated that he would proceed with his changes despite the opposition, though he was removed from the Justice portfolio before the new system could be implemented. In January 2007, the Conservatives appointed two powerful Ontario police union leaders to an advisory committee.

=== President of the Treasury Board ===
Prime Minister Stephen Harper shuffled his cabinet on January 4, 2007, and appointed Toews as President of the Treasury Board. Some commentators argued that Toews's hardline approach to law-and-order issues was damaging the Conservative Party's image among centrist voters, and described his replacement Rob Nicholson as presenting a more moderate image.

In his first major speech after the shuffle, Toews announced increased penalties and longer jail terms for bureaucrats who commit fraud against the government. In the same month, he announced that the Canadian Wheat Board would be subject to the Access to Information Act.

As Treasury Board President, Toews was responsible for overseeing the Federal Accountability Act, which was passed into law in 2006. In January 2008, he introduced a Lobbying Act to replace Canada's Lobbyists Registration Act. The new Act created a category of senior public officials called "designated public office holders", whose interactions with lobbyists would need to be reported. It also created a Commissioner of Lobbying (to replace the Registrar of Lobbyists), and increased penalties for violations. The coordinator of the group Democracy Watch was strongly critical of the changes, noting that the new rules only covered "oral and arranged communication" between ministers and government officials while exempting written correspondence and chance encounters. After the Act officially became law in July 2008, it was discovered that some arranged meetings between ministers, government officials and lobbyists' clients would not have to be reported at all, if the lobbyist who arranged the meeting was not actually present. Lobbyists were not required to report such meetings, and the clients would only be required to do so if they were themselves registered under the act.

In February 2008, Toews and Minister of Public Works Michael Fortier announced that the Harper government would spend $10 million less on public opinion research in its next budget. This decision followed criticism that the government was spending far more on polls than the previous Liberal administrations. Toews' department also shut down the Co-ordination of Access to Information Requests System (CAIRS) in April 2008. Critics argued that the system provided a vital resource for citizens attempting to investigate previously released documents. Toews argued that it was expensive, and slowed access to government information.

During a June 2008 parliamentary debate, Toews described Canadian jurist Louise Arbour, the retiring United Nations High Commissioner for Human Rights, as a "disgrace". He indicated that he made the remarks with respect to her past statements on Israel (during the 2006 Lebanon War, Arbour argued that the killing of innocent civilians by any party could amount to war crimes). This statement was widely criticized. Liberal MP Martha Hall Findlay responded that Toews had taken Arbour's remarks "completely out of context", and described his comments as an "appalling" personal attack. Claire L'Heureux-Dubé also criticized Toews' comments, writing that Arbour had avoided taking sides in the Middle East conflict.

Toews was invited to speak at an event marking the 25th anniversary of the Charter of Rights and Freedoms, but declined.

In November 2007, disgraced businessman and lobbyist Karlheinz Schreiber filed an affidavit in Ontario Superior Court that contained serious accusations against former Prime Minister Brian Mulroney. The Canadian media subsequently reported that Justice officials had prepared a briefing note on Schreiber the previous year, while Toews was still minister. Bureaucrats indicated that neither Toews nor his successor, Rob Nicholson, had read the material. Some columnists suggested that the Conservative ministers may have intentionally avoided briefings on the subject.

=== Minister responsible for Manitoba ===
In late 2007, Toews indicated that the Harper government would not prioritize funding for a new football stadium proposed by Winnipeg media mogul David Asper. He later modified his position, and announced in June 2008 that he was interested in moving forward with a revised stadium plan.

Toews's public visibility declined after his reassignment as Treasury Board President, and the Winnipeg Free Press reported in May 2008 that he was not playing a prominent role in discussions about the Canadian Museum for Human Rights in Winnipeg or the proposed football stadium.

=== Federal Minister of Public Safety ===
On January 19, 2010, Prime Minister Stephen Harper announced that Toews would replace Peter Van Loan as the new Public Safety Minister. The Adult Entertainment Association of Canada released a statement in 2010 that the government's crackdown on sex industry worker visas had resulted in a stripper shortage, and Toews responded by saying that the strip clubs that were short on strippers because of the crackdown were engaging in human trafficking.

On April 22, 2010, Toews was accused of political interference regarding the Conservative government’s decision to cancel plans to build an $88-million facility for the Canadian HIV Vaccine Initiative (CHVI) but managed to escape blame in the House of Commons Standing Committee on Health report. CHVI was originally launched in 2007 and its initial cornerstone was the establishment in Canada of a pilot scale HIV vaccine manufacturing facility to produce clinical trial lots. Liberal MPs on the committee accused Toews and other Conservative ministers of shirking their parliamentary duties by not appearing, while Tory MPs said a week's notice wasn't enough time for them to fit a committee meeting into their schedules. Winnipeg spent three years and $750,000 on its bid for a new centre, expecting to employ 60 to 70 people in high-tech jobs. Had it been built, the facility would have been capable of providing a Canadian homegrown vaccine for the COVID-19 pandemic. Over a decade later, Moderna USA proposes to fill that mRNA facility void and partner with local resources.

In February 2012, as Minister, Toews introduced the Protecting Children from Internet Predators Act (also known as Bill C-30). The bill, which made no mention of children or "Internet predators" outside of its title, would have granted police agencies expanded powers, mandate that internet service providers (ISPs) provide subscriber information without a warrant and compel providers to reveal information transmitted over their networks with a warrant. When criticised about privacy concerns, Toews responded that people "can either stand with us or with the child pornographers." Public response followed, with an anonymous Twitter account posting personal information of Toews' court proceedings during his divorce, and around this time Conservative support appeared to back away from the bill and open up to amendments. Toews later denied that he had made the "child pornographers" reference, despite his comments being available in Hansard and on video. In February 2013 the government announced Bill C-30 would be scrapped entirely in favor of changes in Canada's warrant-less wiretap law. Vic Toews resigned from his position on July 8, 2013 and retired from politics.

== Judicial career ==
On March 7, 2014, Toews was appointed as a Judge on the Court of King's Bench of Manitoba by Justice Minister Peter MacKay.

In March 2015, Toews had his judicial paycheque garnished to pay rent he owed while he lived in Gatineau during his time as a federal politician. His former landlord won an order from the Quebec Rental Board for Toews to pay $3,900 plus interest that had been unpaid for more than a year. Toews argued that he did not understand the judicial document that had been sent to him by the collections agency because it was only written in French. However, the judge overseeing the case did not accept this argument, saying that given Toews' legal experience, including his time as Justice Minister, meant he should have been aware of the issue when receiving a judicial document marked "DÉCISION".

In March 2017, Toews ruled that R v Jordan's 18-month limit before a provincial court case stayed for unreasonable delay did not apply to the speeding case he was deciding. He overturned the decision below because while the delay between the speeding incident and the day the case went to trial was exactly 18 months, the ticket was issued eight days after the speeding incident and the trial was therefore held within the 18-month limit.

== Ethics commissioner's ruling of conflict of interest ==
In April 2017, Canada's ethics commissioner found that Toews had broken the Conflict of Interest Act by providing advice and meeting public officials on behalf of the Peguis First Nation for the Kapyong Barracks land transfer issue. In 2007, Toews, then President of the Treasury Board, had approved the transfer of the barracks to the Canada Lands Company. The Peguis First Nation, among others, filed suit against the government and named Toews as a respondent. Toews was barred by the Conflict of Interest Act from acting for any other party in the case as a formerly involved cabinet minister. Toews also breached the two-year cooling off period for public office holders by consulting for Norway House Cree Nation through his wife's company. After receiving a private complaint, the Canadian Judicial Council, announced that it would review Toew's actions. Toews challenged the ethics commissioner's finding to the Federal Court of Canada, which prompted the judicial council to suspend its review pending the outcome of the challenge. Toews then suspended his challenge in November 2017, saying that he wanted the judicial council proceedings to be resolved as soon as possible.

== Electoral record ==
=== Federal ===
2011 Canadian federal election: Provencher
Party	Candidate	Votes	%	±%	Expenditures
Conservative	Vic Toews	27,820	70.60	+5.95	$70,719.84
New Democratic	Al Mackling	7,051	17.89	+4.17	$14,274.04
Liberal	Terry Hayward	2,645	6.71	-5.86	$25,938.56
Green	Janine Gibson	1,164	2.95	-2.84	$210.00
Christian Heritage	David Reimer	510	1.29	-1.95	$8,372.94
Pirate	Ric Lim	215	0.55	–	$393.24
Total valid votes/expense limit		39,405	100.0	–	$ 90,198.71
Total rejected ballots		169	0.43	-0.00	
Turnout		39,574	61.73	+5.63	
Eligible voters		64,104			
Conservative hold		Swing		+0.89	

2008 Canadian federal election: Provencher
Party	Candidate	Votes	%	±%	Expenditures
Conservative	Vic Toews	23,303	64.65	-1.03	$67,419
New Democratic	Ross Martin	4,947	13.72	+0.01	$6,406
Liberal	Shirley Hiebert	4,531	12.57	-3.27	$16,369
Green	Janine Gibson	2,089	5.79	+1.02	$1,093
Christian Heritage	David Reimer	1,170	3.24	–	$10,130
Total valid votes/expense limit		36,040	100.0	–	$87,213
Total rejected ballots		156	0.43	+0.02	
Turnout		36,196	58.01	-7.04	

2006 Canadian federal election: Provencher
Party	Candidate	Votes	%	±%	Expenditures
Conservative	Vic Toews	25,199	65.68	+2.66	$40,862.19
Liberal	Wes Penner	6,077	15.84	−9.08	$75,239.46
New Democratic	Patrick O'Connor	5,259	13.71	+4.70	$2,266.71
Green	Janine Gibson	1,830	4.77	+1.72	$87.31
Total valid votes		38,365	100.00		
Total rejected ballots		157	0.41	−0.02	
Turnout		38,522	65.05	+5.38	
Electors on the lists		59,216			
Sources: Official Results, Elections Canada and Financial Returns, Elections Canada.

2004 Canadian federal election: Provencher
Party	Candidate	Votes	%	±%	Expenditures
Conservative	Vic Toews	22,694	63.02	+4.99	$70,851.00
Liberal	Peter Epp	8,975	24.92	−10.94	$64,895.23
New Democratic	Sarah Zaharia	3,244	9.01	+2.90	$1,472.79
Green	Janine Gibson	1,100	3.05	–	$480.59
Total valid votes		36,013	100.00		
Total rejected ballots		155	0.43	+0.07	
Turnout		36,168	59.67	−10.36	
Electors on the lists		60,617			
Percentage change figures are factored for redistribution. Conservative Party percentages are contrasted with the combined Canadian Alliance and Progressive Conservative percentages from 2000.
Sources: Official Results, Elections Canada and Financial Returns, Elections Canada.

2000 Canadian federal election: Provencher
Party	Candidate	Votes	%	±%	Expenditures
Alliance	Vic Toews	21,358	52.76	+17.68	$65,896.75
Liberal	David Iftody	14,419	35.62	−4.38	$60,917.43
Progressive Conservative	Henry C. Dyck	2,726	6.73	−9.59	$7,780.05
New Democratic	Peter Hiebert	1,980	4.89	−3.71	$210.45
Total valid votes		40,483	100.00		
Total rejected ballots		148	0.36	−0.10	
Turnout		40,631	70.03	+5.09	
Electors on the lists		58,020			
Sources: Official Results, Elections Canada and Financial Returns, Elections Canada.

=== Provincial ===
1999 Manitoba general election: Rossmere
Party	Candidate	Votes	%	±%	Expenditures
New Democratic	Harry Schellenberg	5,097	49.21	4.49	$25,409.00
Progressive Conservative	Vic Toews	4,803	46.37	0.40	$30,765.70
Liberal	Cecilia Connelly	396	3.82	-5.49	$766.92
Libertarian	Chris Buors	62	0.60	–	$353.40
Total valid votes		10,358	–	–	
Rejected		54	–		
Eligible voters / turnout		13,102	79.47	2.39	
Source(s) Source: Manitoba. Chief Electoral Officer (1999). Statement of Votes for the 37th Provincial General Election, September 21, 1999 (PDF) (Report). Winnipeg: Elections Manitoba.

Note: A subsequent investigation by Elections Manitoba found that Toews overspent by $7,500
in the 1999 campaign.

1995 Manitoba general election: Rossmere
Party	Candidate	Votes	%	±%	Expenditures
Progressive Conservative	Vic Toews	4,318	45.97	14.79	$20,855.00
New Democratic	Harry Schellenberg	4,201	44.72	1.53	$22,807.00
Liberal	Cecilia Connelly	875	9.31	-13.63	$6,262.74
Total valid votes		9,394	–	–	
Rejected		37	–		
Eligible voters / turnout		12,235	77.08	–	
Source(s) Source: Manitoba. Chief Electoral Officer (1999). Statement of Votes for the 37th Provincial General Election, September 21, 1999 (PDF) (Report). Winnipeg: Elections Manitoba.

1990 Manitoba general election: Elmwood
Party	Candidate	Votes	%	±%
New Democratic	Jim Maloway	4,127	46.98	8.77
Progressive Conservative	Vic Toews	3,035	34.55	10.19
Liberal	Ed Price	1,623	18.47	-17.53
Total valid votes		8,785	–	–
Rejected		35	–	
Eligible voters / turnout		12,313	71.63	3.65
Source(s) Source: Manitoba. Chief Electoral Officer (1999). Statement of Votes for the 37th Provincial General Election, September 21, 1999 (PDF) (Report). Winnipeg: Elections Manitoba.

All electoral information is taken from Elections Canada and Elections Manitoba. Provincial election expenditures refer to individual candidate expenses. Italicized expenditures refer to submitted totals, and are presented when the final reviewed totals are not available.
