= Harold Neufeld =

Canadian politician (1927–2025)

Member of the Legislative Assembly of Manitoba for Rossmere
- In office April 26, 1988 – May 12, 1993
- Preceded by: Vic Schroeder
- Succeeded by: Harry Schellenberg

Personal details
- Born: Harold John Neufeld; October 10, 1927 Altona, Manitoba, Canada
- Died: July 12, 2025 (aged 97)
- Party: Progressive Conservative
- Profession: Accountant

Harold John Neufeld (October 10, 1927 – July 12, 2025) was a politician in Manitoba, Canada. He was a member of the Legislative Assembly of Manitoba from 1988 to 1993, and a cabinet minister in the government of Gary Filmon from 1988 to 1992.

== Career ==
Neufeld began a public practice as a chartered accountant in 1954, and was a member of the Chartered Accountants of Manitoba.

He first ran for the Manitoba legislature in the 1986 provincial election as a Progressive Conservative, losing to incumbent New Democrat Vic Schroeder by 527 votes in the north-end Winnipeg riding of Rossmere. In the 1988 election, with NDP support falling throughout the province, he was able to defeat Schroeder by 526 votes in a rematch.

Neufeld was appointed Minister of Energy and Mines with responsibility for the Manitoba Hydro Act and Seniors on May 9, 1988. He was relieved of the latter responsibility on April 21, 1989. He was re-elected by an increased margin in the 1990 provincial election.

Neufeld stepped down from his cabinet position on January 14, 1992, and resigned from the legislature on May 12, 1993. There are suggestions that Neufeld resigned as a matter of principle, disturbed by the dubious methods used by the Filmon government to conceal its deficit spending.

A lifelong Mennonite, Neufeld joined the executive of Menno Simons College and became chair of the Menno Simons College Foundation after his retirement from the legislature.
