= RantMedia =

RantMedia/RantRadio
- Type: Industrial, Cyberpunk, Talk radio
- Country: Canada
- First air date: January 3, 1999
- Availability: SHOUTcast, Torrent, YouTube, Google video
- Area: Worldwide
- Key people: James O'Brien (Cimmerian), founder & producer Sean Kennedy (SKTFM), writer / performer Derek Anderson (Enki), network administrator Marc G. (Helosix), program director (industrial); Michael Moore (Sparky), program director (punk); Michael Elliott (KindelingBoy), copywriter / editor
- Dissolved: January 3, 2019
- Affiliation: Independent
- Official website: http://RantMedia.ca

RantMedia was an independent media organization and serves as the host company for various audio and video projects by James O'Brien and Sean Kennedy, including RantRadio. RantMedia has also distributed content via torrent, various video hosting services, private download, and viral physical media dispersement since its inception in 1999. It last aired on January 3, 2019.

== Media outlets ==
=== RantRadio ===
RantRadio was a commercial-free SHOUTcast Internet radio station that began broadcasting from Langley, British Columbia, and has been 24 hours a day, 7 days a week since January 3, 1999. Its first broadcast was four days after SHOUTcast was officially announced, making RantRadio one of the oldest SHOUTcast radio stations. RantRadio is not supported by sponsorship or advertising and gets permission from all of its artists played to broadcast their work without charge. All shows on the website are covered by Creative Commons. This license allows a user to freely copy, distribute, transmit and host content in any way as long as it is not used for a commercial purpose.

Contributors to RantRadio include Sean Kennedy, Art "Smokehouse" Lindsey, "2 the Ranting Gryphon", Mark "Rizzn" Hopkins. Listening base is worldwide, with fans tuning in as far away as Switzerland.

==== Milestones ====
- July 26, 2000 - Corporate buyers approached O'Brien and Kennedy with an offer to buy the station and were thrown out (a non-disclosure contract prevents the co-founders from discussing the details).
- July 3, 2002 - RantRadio reaches 5,000 measured listeners
- April 11, 2003 - Art "Smokehouse" Lindsey, III was appointed by O'Brien and Kennedy to function as program director of RantRadio.
- November 17, 2003 - RantRadio split into three separate streams of punk, industrial and talk, each with specialty shows catering to each respective format.
- January 3, 2009 - The 10-year anniversary RantMeet event was held at VanCity theatre in Vancouver, British Columbia.
- January 3, 2019 - The 20-year anniversary "send-off" was aired on YouTube.

=== RantTV ===
RantTV started after Nullsoft released their video streaming format and broadcaster tools and has been broadcasting 24 hours a day since June 15, 2003.

Currently in rotation on RantTV are shows such as old episodes of SKTFMTV, current and past episodes of Patrolling with Sean Kennedy, as well as many other original shows viewer-created for broadcast on RantTV such as Storm The Wire, Obsoleet, RedOctagon Television, Lore's lectures, and R4nger5: Back of Beyond.

=== RantPrint ===
RantMedia's Internet counterculture 'zine PA1N is written and maintained by the Rant community. Rant has self-published a limited edition run of 250 copies of the paperback The Bloodstained Rabbit and later The Scabbed Wings Of Abaddon by Kennedy.

=== RantCommunity ===
The RantMedia Community is an online forum which has replaced the original RantRadio forums, and also some blogging and workflow management (based upon the drupal package). This section also has a few external links to services provided by some of the fans and volunteers of community, such as the deviantART group for artwork pertaining to RantMedia and Life with Sean, a comic series based on the personalities of RantMedia (drawn by Lindsey).

== Audio works ==
=== Rants & "What The Hell?!?" ===
The first regular radio show on RantRadio, hosted by Kennedy, was called What The Hell?!?, a round-robin current events discussion recorded and broadcast. Early on, in what became part of a regular feature on the show, Kennedy performed over 100 "rants", spoken word pieces each two to four minutes long, which were characterised by both Kennedy's rapid, enthusiastic style of speech and the editing style of O'Brien, the producer and a co-host of What the Hell?!?. Both the show and these rants touched on topics to do with survivalism, computer culture, and social issues such as suicide and the questionable need for government to protect people from themselves. Kennedy is quoted describing the show as "Denis Leary, Jello Biafra, and Dennis Miller hopped up on coke trying to kill each other with shovels while Hunter S. Thompson does play-by-play commentary." What the Hell?!? finished with its 122nd show on April 29, 2001.

=== The Sean Kennedy Radio Show ===
Beginning January 14, 2002, Kennedy became the co-host of The Sean Kennedy Radio Show, along with O'Brien, who again acted as the show's producer. The show ran for 79 episodes up through July 14, 2003, during which time Kennedy started his antagonistic stance towards Scientology and branded his following as "Wogs", in reference to the diametrical opposite of the followers of Scientology.

=== Tales From The Afternow ===
Tales From The Afternow is a Cyberpunk Internet radio serial drama started by Kennedy on June 24, 2002. The show is portrayed as a series of audio diary entries made from a future Dystopia, in which copyright legislation has been applied to all areas of life, adversely affecting the civil rights of the protagonist. Tales From The Afternow's first-person narration, combined with sound effects, create a future universe in which the fictional Independent Librarian Dynamic Sean Kennedy the Sixth interacts and observes the world around him, while "remembering" and reminiscing about that which has come before. In doing so, he also tells stories from "before his time" including several "legends" that offer alternative views on religion, government, and society as it has developed. References to arcologies, the term "Corpolitical" (Kennedy's often used portmanteau of "corporation" and "political") suggesting that government is synonymous with business, and the concept of the Internet deified as Server are some of the hallmarks of this series.

=== RantSpeak ===
RantSpeak was a show broadcast live Sundays at 10pm with hosts O'Brien and Lindsey, and had call-ins from fans around the world. The show ran for 43 episodes from January 18, 2004 to January 2, 2005, until it was effectively replaced by NewsReal the next day.

=== NewsReal ===
NewsReal was a weekly news broadcast recorded by Kennedy and broadcast every Monday on RantRadio. The show was recorded the previous Thursdays in front of a "live" worldwide avatar audience in Second Life, inside a virtual "studio" on the property owned by the group Rant Media Voice. In addition to its syndicated broadcast, NewsReal had the unique capability to be seen "firsthand" in Second Life from anywhere with Internet access while actually being recorded, complete with Kennedy's avatar sitting behind a desk on a set specially created in cyberspace for this purpose. The show was one hour and takes the form of Kennedy addressing and commenting on current news and events mostly submitted by his readership and fan base. Generally, a news blurb from each of several categories is addressed with a counterculture bend, and emphasis is placed upon watchdogging the Corpolitical and observing technological advances coupled with ethical failures. It began on January 3, 2005 as a daily broadcast and switched to a weekly format from January 2006 to present, except for a seven-month hiatus from June 19, 2006 to January 14, 2007. As of June 2009, NewsReal is syndicated on seven radio stations including RantRadio Talk and available on three podcasts, and aired live on Second Life at Node Archers (Coord: 155,74,666) and on pirate shortwave radio 6673.3 kHz. Sean Kennedy ended the show in 2011 at show 500 in order to focus on his new project, Mermanaut.

=== Pirate Party Radio ===
Pirate Party Radio was a weekly audio show broadcast every Thursday with host James O'Brien. The show focused on news stories relating to Pirate Party platform issues and is the official radio show of Pirate Party of Canada, United States Pirate Party and endorsed by the Pirate Party UK.

== Notable audio broadcast appearances ==
- January 19, 2007 - Tales From The Afternow episodes 1 through 15 are played on terrestrial radio station CFMU on the show Twilight of the False Gods, episodes 25 through 38.

== Video works ==
=== SKTFMTV ===
Each episode of SKTFMTV (Sean Kennedy The Fucking Man Television) is a combination of video clips documenting Kennedy's activities. Generally the show consists of social commentary, survivalist activities, and interactions with unusual religious or social groups. Thirteen episodes have been created so far.

=== The Sean Kennedy TV Show ===
This was a spinoff from the radio show, and ran for 20 episodes in 2003 from July 21 to December 22. Each show had a live audience, and a number of guests, usually musicians or adherents to an esoteric subculture. Amid discussions of conspiracy and alternative media, the show reported news that doesn't get covered by mainstream media.

=== Patrolling with Sean Kennedy ===
Begun in June 2004, this series deals with the lifestyle and preparation of an adherent to the Survivalist subculture, from an intentionally ironic and occasionally humorous perspective. The series intersperses the methods and equipment of a survivalist with a number of social commentaries, similar to Kennedy's earlier rants. The first season concentrates mainly on basic survival gear called "kit" and how to use it, interspersed with tips for a healthy mind and body, set in a rural environment, while the second season looks at the interaction between the survivalist and the rest of society in an urban environment, blending the survival mindset with the advantages of technology. A third season was in production, but has been put on hold. In the meantime, editing has begun on Patrolling Season 2.5, which will feature clips filmed between season 2 and 3.

=== Tales from the Afternow ===
'Tales from the Afternow: Little Rocks' is an animated short based on the second episode of 'Tales from the Afternow' radio series written by Sean Kennedy. The film was animated by film maker David T. Krupicz and produced by James O'Brien of RantMedia, it has been shown at many film festivals but is yet to have been released publicly.

== Notable video broadcast appearances ==
- May - September 2005 - Patrolling with Sean Kennedy aired on Berkeley TV Channel 28.
- August 14, 2009—present - Patrolling with Sean Kennedy aired weekly on Controversial TV in the UK and Ireland via Sky.

== People of RantMedia ==
=== James O'Brien ===
James O'Brien (born October 3, 1973), known by his online moniker Cimmerian, films and edits all official videos as well as performs, records, and produces official radio shows under RantMedia. He hosts Pirate Party Radio, co-hosts NewsReal and also sings lead vocal in the Electronica band Porn on Beta.

=== Sean Kennedy ===
Sean Kennedy at RantMeet 2009

Sean Kennedy (born October 23, 1973) is a Canadian author of horror novels with mythical and cyberpunk themes, and the primary voice of Internet radio and television shows hosted by RantMedia. The characteristic outro heard at the end of most of his shows is "My name is Sean Kennedy, and I am The Fucking Man."

As of February 2023, Kennedy has written five novels (The Scabbed Wings of Abaddon, published in 2007, Immersion: 2086 published on January 1, 2016, Hardwired Faith, published in 2017, Kaizen Sanctuary, published in 2017, and Heresy's Champion, published in 2018,) as well as a short story collection (Ambient Reports: 2087 published on September 1, 2016,) a novella (The Bloodstained Rabbit, released on June 27, 2005,) and the short story The Locksmith, which was adapted to comic form by Marc Rødskov in January 2009.

== Cult followings ==
=== KULT ===
KULT (Kennedy's Uber Leet Terrorists) was an organization spawned by Kennedy's anti-establishment rants, described as an ungoverned network of "digital-wet-wired-cyber masons with shovels" who recognize "the dark cyber-world that is coming." As of September 2000, more than 1,000 new visitors logged on to the KULT website each day. Members were divided into "klans" and one went so far as to receive a tattoo of the KULT symbol on his chest. Another got a tattoo of her symbol on her wrist. The group was disbanded among great controversy in 2001, remnants of the membership regrouped into several splinter sites, all of which subsequently dissolved by the early 2010s.

== Advocacy ==
=== SOCAN Tariff 22 ===
RantRadio was particularly active in trying to repeal SOCAN's Tariff 22 proposals for 2003. Such a move would have called for a minimum fee of C$0.25 per listener per month, plus 10% of advertising revenue if that exceeds the minimum rate. The proposed NRCC Tariff 22 was eventually withdrawn April 16, 2008.
