= Erna Braun =

Canadian politician

Manitoba Minister of Labour and Immigration
- In office October 18, 2013 – May 3, 2016
- Premier: Greg Selinger
- Preceded by: new portfolio

Member of the Legislative Assembly of Manitoba for Rossmere
- In office May 22, 2007 – April 19, 2016
- Preceded by: Harry Schellenberg
- Succeeded by: Andrew Micklefield

President of the Winnipeg Teachers' Association
- In office 2005–2007
- In office 1989–1990

Personal details
- Party: New Democratic Party
- Education: University of Manitoba
- Profession: Teacher
- Website: ernabraun.ca

Erna Braun is a politician in Manitoba, Canada. She was elected to the Legislative Assembly of Manitoba in the 2007 provincial election, in the electoral division of Rossmere. Braun is a member of the New Democratic Party. She was the head of the Winnipeg Teachers Association.

== Electoral record ==
2016 Manitoba general election: Rossmere
Party	Candidate	Votes	%	±%	Expenditures
Progressive Conservative	Andrew Micklefield	5,303	53.26	17.26	$36,677.90
New Democratic	Erna Braun	3,389	34.04	-22.55	$37,323.19
Liberal	Malli Aulakh	838	8.42	4.68	$6,822.53
Manitoba	William Sullivan	427	4.29	–	$1,184.93
Total valid votes/expense limit		9,957	–	–	$52,030.00
Rejected		171	–		
Eligible voters / turnout		16,737	60.51	0.44	
Source(s) Source: Manitoba. Chief Electoral Officer (2016). Statement of Votes for the 41st Provincial General Election, April 19, 2016 (PDF) (Report). Winnipeg: Elections Manitoba. "Election Returns: 41st General Election". Elections Manitoba. 2016.

2011 Manitoba general election: Rossmere
Party	Candidate	Votes	%	±%	Expenditures
New Democratic	Erna Braun	5,392	56.59	-4.12	$27,418.97
Progressive Conservative	Kaur "Karl" Sidhu	3,430	36.00	3.26	$32,542.12
Liberal	Rene Belliveau	356	3.74	-2.82	$356.05
Green	Evan Maydaniuk	351	3.68	–	$618.03
Total valid votes		9,529	–	–	
Rejected		35	–		
Eligible voters / turnout		15,921	60.07	-1.63	
Source(s) Source: Manitoba. Chief Electoral Officer (2011). Statement of Votes for the 40th Provincial General Election, October 4, 2011 (PDF) (Report). Winnipeg: Elections Manitoba. "Election Returns: 40th General Election". Elections Manitoba. 2011.

2007 Manitoba general election: Rossmere
Party	Candidate	Votes	%	±%	Expenditures
New Democratic	Erna Braun	4,836	60.71	-4.84	$28,754.31
Progressive Conservative	Cathy Cox	2,608	32.74	2.98	$18,967.41
Liberal	Isaiah Oyeleru	522	6.55	1.86	$1,792.15
Total valid votes		7,966	–	–	
Rejected		43	–		
Eligible voters / turnout		12,980	61.70	3.48	
Source(s) Source: Manitoba. Chief Electoral Officer (2007). Statement of Votes for the 39th Provincial General Election, May 22, 2007 (PDF) (Report). Winnipeg: Elections Manitoba.

Legislative Assembly of Manitoba
Preceded by Harry Schellenberg	Member of the Legislative Assembly for Rossmere; May 22, 2007 – April 19, 2016	Incumbent
Political offices
Preceded by Jennifer Howard as Manitoba Minister of Labour and Family Services	Manitoba Minister of Labour and Immigration; October 18, 2013 – May 3, 2016	
Preceded by Christine Melnick as Manitoba Minister of Immigration and Multiculturalism	Manitoba Minister of Labour and Immigration; October 18, 2013 – May 3, 2016	
