= Protecting Canadians from Online Crime Act =

Act of the Parliament of Canada

Parliament of Canada
- Long title: An Act to amend the Criminal Code, the Canada Evidence Act, the Competition Act and the Mutual Legal Assistance in Criminal Matters Act
- Citation: S.C. 2014, c. 31
- Considered by: House of Commons of Canada
- Considered by: Senate of Canada
- Royal assent: December 9, 2014
- Commenced: March 9, 2015

Legislative history

Initiating chamber: House of Commons of Canada
- Bill citation: C-13, 41st Parliament, 2nd Session
- Introduced by: Peter Gordon MacKay MP, Minister of Justice
- First reading: November 20, 2013
- Second reading: April 28, 2014
- Third reading: October 20, 2014

Revising chamber: Senate of Canada
- Member(s) in charge: Mobina Jaffer
- First reading: October 21, 2014
- Second reading: November 5, 2014
- Third reading: December 4, 2014
- Status: In force

The Protecting Canadians from Online Crime Act (French: Loi sur la protection des Canadiens contre la cybercriminalité) is a law passed by the Parliament of Canada in 2014. It was introduced in the House of Commons by the Conservative government of Prime Minister Stephen Harper on November 20, 2013, during the 41st Parliament, and received royal assent on December 9, 2014.

Commonly known as lawful access legislation, the Act is the fifth iteration of a framework that empowers Canadian law enforcement and security intelligence agencies and the product of four previous attempts made by Liberal and Conservative governments.

== Objective ==
The Act was intended to address the problem of cyberbullying, which had received a high profile from the cases involving the deaths of Rehtaeh Parsons and Amanda Todd. It incorporated recommendations concerning cyberbullying and the distribution of intimate images that were made in 2013 to federal, provincial and territorial ministers responsible for public safety. It also would implement obligations arising from Canada's accession to the Budapest Convention on Cybercrime in 2001.

== Controversy ==
Critics argued Bill C-13 capitalized on the recent deaths of Rehtaeh Parsons and Amanda Todd. MP Claude Gravelle noted in House of Commons debates: "the Conservatives decided to include things that have nothing to do with cyberbullying. For example, there is a subclause on terrorists and something else on people who steal cable television signals, which has absolutely nothing to do with cyberbullying". Senator Mobina Jaffer argued in debates of the Senate, "Amanda Todd's and Rehtaeh Parsons' lives would have been no different if this bill had been enacted earlier".

The law makes it illegal to distribute images of a person in any way without their consent. It is said this could also violate people's privacy by giving authorities more power to watch what they are doing online. Police now only need "reasonable grounds for suspicion" to get a warrant. These warrants can now include allowing police to access online data, phone records and digital tracking. "The bill also grants immunity to telecoms that voluntarily hand over data, a sticking point raising privacy concerns." "Critics have warned the bill's thresholds for warrants are too low and that the cyber bullying law is too broad and vague."

== Legislative history ==
This bill was proposed four times previously, making Bill C-13 the fifth iteration of lawful access proposals introduced into Canadian Parliament. Liberal and Conservative governments had each attempted to introduce lawful access.

=== First attempt: Bill C-74 (2005) ===
Lawful access was first proposed under Bill C-74 (short titled the Modernization of Investigative Techniques Act) by Liberal Prime Minister Paul Martin on November 15, 2005, but did not advance past its first reading in the House of Commons after Parliament was dissolved on November 28, 2005.

=== Second attempt: Bill C-46 and Bill C-47 (2009) ===
On June 18, 2009, the Conservative government of Prime Minister Stephen Harper proposed two bills in Parliament to address lawful access issues, Bill C-46 (short titled Investigative Powers for the 21st Century Act) and Bill C-47 (short titled Technical Assistance for Law Enforcement in the 21st Century Act). These two bills failed to advance beyond the House of Commons, as the government prorogued Parliament on December 30, 2009, and the bills died on the Order paper.

=== Third attempt: Bill C-50, Bill C-51 and Bill C-52 (2010) ===
In 2010, the Conservative government returned to the issue, by introducing three bills: Bill C-50 (short titled Improving Access to Investigative Tools for Serious Crimes Act), Bill C-51 (short titled Investigative Powers for the 21st Century Act) and Bill C-52 (short titled Investigating and Preventing Criminal Electronic Communications Act). These three bills did not advance as the government was defeated by a motion of non-confidence vote on March 25, 2011. In the federal election, the Conservatives won a majority government.

=== Fourth attempt: Bill C-30 (2012) ===
In the new Parliament on February 14, 2012, Public Safety Minister Vic Toews introduced Bill C-30, with the short title, Protecting Children from Internet Predators Act. It was criticised because "the bill actually made no reference to child predators except in its title". If passed, Bill C-30 would have granted law enforcement and security intelligence agencies expanded surveillance powers, mandated internet service providers (ISPs) to disclose Canadian subscriber information (such as metadata) without a warrant, and compelled ISPs to reveal information transmitted over their networks without a warrant or judicial oversight.

The bill received heavy criticism within Parliament and from the public. Toews's defence of the bill, including saying that critics of the bill supported child pornography, attracted even more criticism.

The government eventually withdrew Bill C-30. The Minister of Justice, Rob Nicholson, acknowledged the public opposition to the bill, and stated:

We will not be proceeding with Bill C-30 and any attempts that we will continue to have to modernize the Criminal Code will not contain the measures contained in C-30, including the warrantless mandatory disclosure of basic subscriber information or the requirement for telecommunications service providers to build intercept capability within their systems. We’ve listened to the concerns of Canadians who have been very clear on this and responding to that.

When the government introduced Bill C-13 later in 2013, it did not include the provisions from Bill C-30 which had attracted the most criticism: the power for authorities to intercept data carried by telecommunications service providers, and to make warrantless requests for subscriber information from service providers.
