= Vic Schroeder =

Canadian politician (born 1944)

Member of the Legislative Assembly of Manitoba For Rossmere
- In office October 16, 1979 – April 26, 1988
- Preceded by: Edward Schreyer
- Succeeded by: Harold Neufeld

Personal details
- Born: February 16, 1944 (age 82) Altona, Manitoba, Canada
- Party: New Democratic
- Education: University of Winnipeg; University of Manitoba
- Profession: lawyer

Victor Harold Schroeder (born February 16, 1944) is a politician in Manitoba, Canada. He was a member of the Legislative Assembly of Manitoba from 1979 to 1988, and a senior cabinet minister in the New Democratic Party government of Howard Pawley from 1981 to 1988.

== Education ==
Schroeder was born on February 16, 1944 to a Mennonite family in Altona, Manitoba. The son of Henry Schroeder and Anna Braun, he was educated at Mennonite Collegiate Institute in Gretna, Manitoba, the University of Winnipeg and the University of Manitoba.

== Career ==
He worked as a lawyer before entering public life, and was a member of the Manitoba Securities Commission as well as serving as a vice-chairman of the Manitoba Public Utilities Board. He first ran for the Manitoba legislature in a 1972 by-election in the Winnipeg riding of Wolseley, finishing third against Manitoba Liberal Party leader Izzy Asper. In 1967, he married Leona Esther Thiesson.

Schroeder contested another by-election in 1979, this time in the north-end Winnipeg riding of Rossmere, recently vacated by former premier Edward Schreyer upon his appointment at Governor General of Canada. The election was surprisingly close, with Schroeder defeating Progressive Conservative Harold Piercy by only 230 votes. Following his victory, Schroeder supported Howard Pawley's successful bid to become party leader. He was re-elected by a greater margin in the provincial election of 1981.

The NDP formed a majority government following this election, and Schroeder was appointed minister of finance and Minister of Labour and Manpower on November 30, 1981, also carrying responsibility for the Civil Service Commission and Civil Service Superannuation Board and the administration of Pension Benefits Act and Public Servants Insurance Act. On July 19, 1982, he was relieved of all cabinet responsibilities except for the Finance portfolio.

=== Other jobs ===
While retaining Finance, he also served as Chairman of the Treasury Board from July 28, 1982, to November 4, 1983, and as minister responsible for Manitoba Data Services from August 20, 1982, to November 4, 1983. On November 4, 1983, he was named Minister of Crown Investments and given responsibility for the Civil Service a second time. On January 5, 1984, he was also given responsibility for the Manitoba Development Corporation Act. He was relieved of his Civil Service responsibilities on January 30, 1985.

=== 1986 election ===
In the provincial election of 1986, he defeated Tory candidate Harold Neufeld by 527 votes.

Following the election, on April 17, 1986, he was relieved of the Finance portfolio, retained in the Crown Investments portfolio and also named Minister of Industry, Trade and Technology. From May 20 to August 29, 1986, he also served as Minister of Energy and Mines, responsible for Manitoba Hydro. On February 4, 1987, he was relieved of the Crown Investments portfolio and given responsibility for the Manitoba Development Corporation. Finally, on September 21, 1987, he was given the additional portfolio of attorney general.

The NDP were unexpectedly defeated in the legislature in 1988, and Schroeder lost to Neufeld by 526 votes in the election which followed.

== Career after politics ==
Schroeder was appointed as the chair of Manitoba Hydro in 2000, by the NDP government of Gary Doer. During his time as chairman, wind power was incorporated into the utility's power production. Schroeder retired as chairman in February 2012.
