= Harry Schellenberg =

Canadian politician (1939–2024)

Member of the Legislative Assembly of Manitoba for Rossmere
- In office September 21, 1999 – May 22, 2007
- Preceded by: Vic Toews
- Succeeded by: Erna Braun
- In office September 21, 1993 – April 25, 1995
- Preceded by: Harold Neufeld
- Succeeded by: Vic Toews

Personal details
- Born: May 25, 1939 near Boissevain, Manitoba, Canada
- Died: November 20, 2024 (aged 85) Winnipeg, Manitoba, Canada
- Party: New Democratic Party
- Spouse: Irene Heidebrecht (m. 1975)
- Children: 2
- Profession: Teacher

Harry Schellenberg (May 25, 1939 – November 20, 2024) was a Canadian politician in the province of Manitoba. He was a member of the Manitoba legislature from 1993 to 1995 and again from 1999 to 2007, representing the north-end Winnipeg riding of Rossmere for the New Democratic Party.

Born on a farm near Boissevain, Manitoba, Schellenberg attended the Mennonite Collegiate Institute and Manitoba Teachers' College. He worked as a teacher for more than thirty years before entering political life, including over twenty spent at the River East Collegiate teaching Canadian history and world issues. He was a founding member of Manitoba Parents for German Education, and has participated in such community organizations as Open Circle, a visitation program for inmates at Stony Mountain Penitentiary. During his time as a teacher, he completed a Master of Education degree from the University of Manitoba.

A longtime supporter of the NDP, Schellenberg was first elected to the Manitoba legislature in a 1993 by-election, defeating Progressive Conservative Ed Martens in the north Winnipeg riding of Rossmere. Two years later, he was defeated by Progressive Conservative Vic Toews (later a federal MP in the Canadian Alliance and Conservative parties) by 117 votes.

Schellenberg was elected President of the Manitoba NDP in 1996, and officially served in the position from 1997 to 1999. He returned to the legislature following the 1999 general election, in which he defeated Toews by 5,097 votes to 4,803. In 2003, he was re-elected by a more comfortable margin. He served as Deputy Chairperson of the Committees of the Whole House between 1999 and 2007.

Schellenberg supported Bill Blaikie's campaign to lead the federal New Democratic Party in 2003. Schellenberg did not seek re-election in 2007. He died on November 20, 2024 in Winnipeg, at the age of 85.
