= Modernization of Investigative Techniques Act =

Proposed Canadian federal legislation

The Modernization of Investigative Techniques Act, Bill-C74 was first introduced in the Canadian House of Commons on November 15, 2005. Introduced as a part of a package of "lawful access" proposals, Modernization of Investigative Techniques Act (MITA) if passed, would have required telephone and internet service providers to design, create and maintain interception capabilities into existing networks and into new technologies as they are introduced into Canada. Second, it would have allowed law enforcement to compel telephone and internet service providers to disclose subscriber information without a warrant. The bill failed to pass into law when Parliament was dissolved on November 28, 2005. Lawful access legislation was, however, was re-introduced under the name Bill C-13 (short titled Protecting Canadians from Online Crime Actt) by Stephen Harper's Conservative government on November 20, 2013 and it passed through all legislative stages to receive royal assent on December 9, 2014.

== Background ==
Under the Criminal Code, "lawful access" provisions for the interception of communications by law enforcement was first adopted in 1974. The Criminal Code was amended in the 1980s and again in the 1990s to allow law enforcement the ability to search and seize computer systems. In 1984 the Canadian Security Intelligence Service Act was passed by Parliament giving law enforcement the right to lawfully intercept private communication in defence of national security. Supporters of Modernization of Investigative Techniques Act and other "lawful access" legislation, being proposed to date, believe the passage of these bills will amend current provision for "lawful access" in existing legislation like the Criminal Code and Canadian Security Intelligence Service Act and support law enforcement to lawfully access transmission data from new technologies such as smartphones.

Concerns raised include:

- Creation of new surveillance powers while reducing the level of privacy protection and oversight associated with that surveillance.
- Increased burden to ISPs who would be required to retain traffic data for significant periods of time.

The dissolution of Parliament on November 28, 2005, ended all bills introduced during the 38th Parliament by the, then Liberal government, including Modernization of Investigative Techniques Act, Bill C-74. Anticipating passing of this bill, however, ISPs such as Bell Sympatico have modified their various policies and agreements to contain language to the effect that they may monitor, investigate, and disclose information to satisfy laws, regulations, or government requests. On April 4, 2006, the Prime Minister's Throne Speech did not mention the bill, which fueled speculation that bill had become a low priority for Harper government. However, the Harper government would later introduce its own legislation to modernize lawful access.

== Reintroduction of Bill ==
Liberal MP Marlene Jennings re-introduced the Modernization of Investigative Techniques Act as a Private Member's Bill, Bill C-416 in March 2007 and again in February 2009, as a Private Member`s Bill, Bill C-285. In both instances, Modernization of Investigative Techniques Act only received one reading before new elections were called, ending the review process of the bill.

== Related legislation ==
During the 40th Parliament, 3rd Session, a series of lawful access bills were introduced by the Harper Government:

- C-50: Improving Access to Investigative Tools for Serious Crimes Act
- C-51: Investigative Powers for the 21st Century Act
- C-52: Investigating and Preventing Criminal Electronic Communications Act

The introduction and first reading of these bills were completed on November 1, 2010; the review process for all three bills ended with the dissolution of Parliament on March 26, 2011.

During the 2011 election campaign, Prime Minister Stephen Harper promised to combine the Justice bills introduced prior to the dissolution of Parliament into one all-encompassing crime bill. This bill, known as the Safe Streets and Communities Act (Bill C-10), was introduced on September 20, 2011, and received its second reading and referral to the Standing Committee on Justice and Human Rights on September 28, 2011; however, the provisions relating to lawful access previously found in Bills C-50, C-51 and C-52 are not included in Bill C-10, and there is no mention of lawful access in this new bill.

== See also ==
- Canadian Internet Policy and Public Interest Clinic
- Public Safety and Emergency Preparedness Canada
- Surveillance
