= Bill C-30: Protecting Children from Internet Predators Act =

Proposed Canadian federal legislation

Parliament of Canada
- Long title: Bill C-30: An Act to Enact the Investigating and Preventing Criminal Electronic Communications Act and to amend the Criminal Code and other Acts
- Considered by: House of Commons

Legislative history
- Bill citation: Bill C-30, 41st Parliament, 1st session
- Introduced by: Vic Toews, Minister of Public Safety
- First reading: February 14, 2012
- Status: Not passed

Bill C-30: Protecting Children from Internet Predators Act (French: Projet de loi C-30: Loi sur la protection des enfants contre les cyberprédateurs) was a proposed amendment to the Criminal Code of Canada introduced by the Conservative government of Prime Minister Stephen Harper on February 14, 2012, during the 41st Canadian Parliament. Similar legislation had been unsuccessfully proposed in the past, by both Liberal and Conservative governments, and mirrored legislation introduced in other countries.

The bill would have granted authorities new powers to monitor and track the digital activities of Canadians in real-time, required service providers to log information about their customers and turn it over if requested, and made back door entrances mandatory allowing remote access of individuals' electronic information, each without needing a warrant. Documents obtained under the Access to Information Act showed that the government desired to use the expanded powers in cases not involving criminality.

The bill did not mention children, or internet predators, other than in its title. Critics stated that the "feel-good name" was unrelated to the content of the bill, and chosen simply to "sell legislation to the public", and that authorities would likely use the powers to harass peaceful protestors and activists.

The bill was widely opposed, particularly after Public Safety Minister Vic Toews told an opposition MP that he could "either stand with us or with the child pornographers" during a debate. The government ultimately withdrew the bill in 2013, acknowledging that opposition.

The government introduced another bill later in 2013, Bill C-13, dealing with legal access to electronic data. Bill C-13 did not include the provisions from bill C-30 which had attracted the most criticism. Bill C-13 passed in December 2014, under the name Protecting Canadians from Online Crime Act.

== History of Bill C-30 ==
There had been several previous attempts to introduce lawful access legislation, allowing police to avoid the necessity of a warrant to obtain information, since 1999 when the Liberal Party of Canada first proposed it. However, none of those proposed bills had passed. Bill C-30 largely mirrored previous bills C-50, C-51 and C-52, introduced by the Conservative government, but which had died upon the dissolution of Parliament for the 2011 federal election. NDP MPs Anne Minh-Thu Quach and Carol Hughes criticised the Liberal party's opposition to this bill, given their previous support for near-identical legislation in the past.

There was an error in a limited number of courtesy copies distributed to the House. These have since been replaced with the correct version.

— Speaker of the House Andrew Scheer, on the relabelled Act

In 2007, Toews's predecessor as public safety minister, Stockwell Day stated that "we have not and we will not be proposing legislation to grant police the powers to get information from internet providers without a warrant". Toews dismissed the comment, and stated that the requirement for court oversight of police was "an additional burden on the criminal justice system."

On February 14, 2012 Toews formally tabled Bill C-30 under the name Lawful Access Act, but withdrew the bill an hour later and resubmitted it with a "last minute change", Protecting Children from Internet Predators Act" instead.

== Content of bill ==
If the police have a legitimate reason to snoop into my banking, email or web-browsing records, a judge would clearly allow for that lawful search to happen. ... I cannot understand why the police would be afraid to permit a judge to legally review a search request if it is in fact necessary and lawful.

— Liberal MP Judy Sgro

The bill would have allowed authorities to demand access to subscriber information from both ISPs and telephone providers without needing to obtain a warrant from a judge, and would have required telecommunications providers to ensure that there was a back door entrance to allow all communications to be intercepted when desired.

The bill would have granted these powers to police agencies, and also to Canadian Security Intelligence Service and Competition Bureau officials, as well as anybody appointed by the Minister of Public Safety to carry out such actions. The bill would also have allowed any of these persons to make copies of the data taken from citizens' digital devices, without oversight or a right of appeal.

The bill would have prohibited ISPs from answering affirmatively if a customer asked them whether authorities had been searching their data.

The bill would have increased the number of actions that can be legally carried out by police officers without a warrant. Section 487.11 of the Criminal Code allowed a police officer to "exercise any of the powers described in subsection 487(1) or 492.1(1) without a warrant". Under Bill C-30, the section would be amended to include "exercise any of the powers described in section 487, 492.1 or 492.2 without a warrant".

Everyone has a BlackBerry, an iPhone, an iPad, laptops. We carry our cellphones with us. Through this bill, the government is giving itself a tool that can determine our geographic location at all times. The government is telling us that the same information is available in the phone book, but the last time I checked, the phone book did not provide my geographic location at all times.

— NDP MP Charmaine Borg

Section 487 of the Criminal Code, allows a police officer to search a building and "use any computer system at the building or place to search any data contained in or available to the computer system", would be left unchanged by Bill C-30. Section 492.1 was to be amended by Bill C-30 to allow a police officer to obtain location tracking data by means of a tracking device and "install, activate, use, maintain, monitor and remove the tracking device, including covertly". Section 492.2 was also to be amended by Bill C-30 to allow a police officer to obtain transmission data by means of a transmission data recorder and "install, activate, use, maintain, monitor and remove the transmission data recorder, including covertly".

In Bill C-30, tracking data was defined as "data that relates to the location of a transaction, individual or thing". Transmission data had a more complicated definition, but essentially refers to meta-data that is attached to a message/communication in order to aid in its transmission to its intended destination, such as IP address, phone number, time, duration, size.

Section 64 of the bill was a final "catch-all" that said that if the government decided it overlooked any additional abilities it believed it needed to fulfill "generally, for carrying out the purposes and provisions of this act", it could have retroactively added those abilities to the law.

== Responses to the bill ==
...police officers are asking for these changes [...] what sinister motives does he think motivate our police officers to ask for the changes that are included in Bill C-30?

— Conservative MP Harold Albrecht

All four opposition parties, the NDP, Liberals, Bloc Québécois, and Green Party were opposed to the lawful access provisions of C-30. In addition, John Williamson (New Brunswick Southwest), David Tilson (Dufferin—Caledon) and Rob Anders (Calgary West) were among the Conservative MPs who opposed the bill. Political criticism from the Liberals, NDP and Greens suggested it was hypocritical for the Conservatives to introduce the bill, after scrapping both the long-form census and gun registry in the name of privacy.

Green Party leader Elizabeth May dubbed the bill's title as propaganda, stating that "other than the fact it’s for propaganda purposes, there’s no reason to call it about Internet predators". She suggested that the Conservatives were trying to use the rhetorical ploy of appealing to the sake of children to garner support. The Province, a newspaper in British Columbia, suggested a more accurate name might be the "Spying on Every Single Canadian any Time We Feel Like it Act".

The bill was supported by many Canadian police agencies. Supporters of the bill stated that all of Canada's attorneys general also support the bill, while critics challenged that statement as untrue.

A coalition of citizens and civil liberties organizations formed the StopSpying.ca coalition in June 2011 to speak out against lawful access. The coalition was led by OpenMedia.ca and was considered responsible for leading the public outcry against Bill C-30.

The Canadian Network Operators Consortium noted that smaller, independent ISPs would likely be unable to afford expensive new equipment to allow authorities real-time monitoring of their customers and may have to discontinue business. The Ministry of Public Safety had estimated that the initial cost to the government to implement the bill would be $80 million over four years, and $6.7 million dollars each year after that. The ISPs responded that the cost could be much higher. According to the CBC, the costs would have either translated as higher telecommunications costs for Canadian consumers, or increased federal taxes to pay for the program.

The British Columbia Civil Liberties Association and Canadian Lawyer magazine suggested that provisions in the bill could violate the Canadian Charter of Rights and Freedoms, and be challenged before the Supreme Court as unreasonable search and seizure of digital information.

Politicians or police will talk themselves into the wisdom of using the same technology to find tax cheats, divorced parents falling behind on child support or even human-rights violators ... What if you’re a member of a faith that believes homosexuality is a sin and you send out emails arguing against gay marriage or gay adoption and you use language that is a little too strong? Or maybe you’re having your basement renovated and you boast to a friend that you’re avoiding the HST by paying cash — should that send off an alarm at the Canada Revenue Agency?

— Lorne Gunter, columnist with the National Post, who initially favoured the bill but reversed his stance

Opposition focused on the provisions that would allow law enforcement agencies and government-appointed inspectors to access identifying information from ISPs on demand, without a warrant. Documents leaked online showed the Canadian Association of Chiefs of Police asking members to find examples of cases that would have profited from lawful access, but no cases had been found, leading critics to charge that police were already able to prosecute predators successfully in Canada with existing legislation.

The international advocacy group Reporters Without Borders opined the bill went too far, and failed to account for "respect for people’s private lives and the presumption of innocence". Federal deputy privacy commissioner Chantal Bernier argued the proposed powers are too broad: "As the legislation is written now, it could impact any law-abiding Canadian citizen."

Media outlets largely panned the bill's proposals: the National Post characterised the bill as "an electronic prisoner's bracelet on every Canadian"; columnist Ivor Tossell of The Globe and Mail said it presented "real dangers"; and the Toronto Star argued that it was the "most grotesque intrusion into our lives".

The University of Ottawa's Michael Geist said the legislation intended to build "an extensive online surveillance infrastructure". Ann Cavoukian, the Ontario Privacy Commissioner, warned that the collected information would be a "gold mine" for potential hackers. All of the nation's privacy commissioners issued a joint statement condemning the bill. Liberal MP Sean Casey satirically asked Toews and Rob Nicholson, the Minister of Justice, to openly divulge their own web surfing histories.

Surveys conducted in February 2012 showed that between 53 and 66 per cent of Canadians opposed the bill being passed.

== Similar legislation in other countries ==
Government officials stated that similar legislation has been introduced in several other countries already, including the United States, Great Britain and Australia. However, critics responded that other countries should serve as a warning to Canada, noting the many errors and broad overreach of their legislation, with police requesting the private information for mundane tasks such as determining school district eligibility.

Similar legislation has been drafted in the Philippines despite being met with up to eight petitions filed with the highest court in the Philippines questioning the constitutionality of the legislation. The Filipino legislation is intended, like the Canadian bill, to prevent cybersex, online child pornography, identity theft, and spamming. However, in addition to these crimes, the Filipino bill also makes libel a cybercrime punishable by up to twelve years. It is generally this last issue that has privacy and right’s groups concerned over the legislation. “It violates Filipinos' rights to free expression and it is wholly incompatible with the Philippine government's obligations under international law,” said Brad Adams, Asia director of US-based Human Rights Watch.

In Australia, Cybercrime Legislation Amendment Bill 2011 allows telecommunications companies to retain customer traffic data for longer if a customer is suspected in a cybercrime, unlike the proposed Canadian legislation however, this information cannot be handed over to police without a warrant. Like the Canadian bill, the Australian version was met with heavy criticism and a report from the Joint Select Committee on Cyber-Safety of Australia took issue with four main flaws in the Australian legislation and made thirteen recommendations, which Attorney-General Robert McClelland said the government will consider.

The Joint Select Committee identified the following as flaws in the Australian bill:

- the bill "fails to distinguish between the retention of traffic metadata, such as the time and destination of an online communication, and the contents of that communication".
- under the bill, "there is a possibility foreign governments could be given access to data in relation to crimes that in Australia would not be serious enough to warrant an interception, like political crimes".
- there is a possibility that foreign governments would not assist the investigation into some cases of child exploitation because they are not treated as seriously in some countries. "Many countries, including many European countries, impose a maximum penalty of two years imprisonment for the possession, dissemination, sale or rent of child sexual abuse material," the report said, which would not trigger the penalty threshold for a "serious" crime.
- the committed also found that there was "the potential for data on Australians to be shared with countries 'at large', rather than limited to those that have also acceded to the Council of Europe convention or have an existing formal mutual assistance arrangement with Australia."

The Electronic Frontier Foundation highlighted the fact that the warrantless British system has resulted in police making an average of more than 1,700 queries daily, for personal information about citizens from their telecommunications providers.

== Vic Toews controversy ==
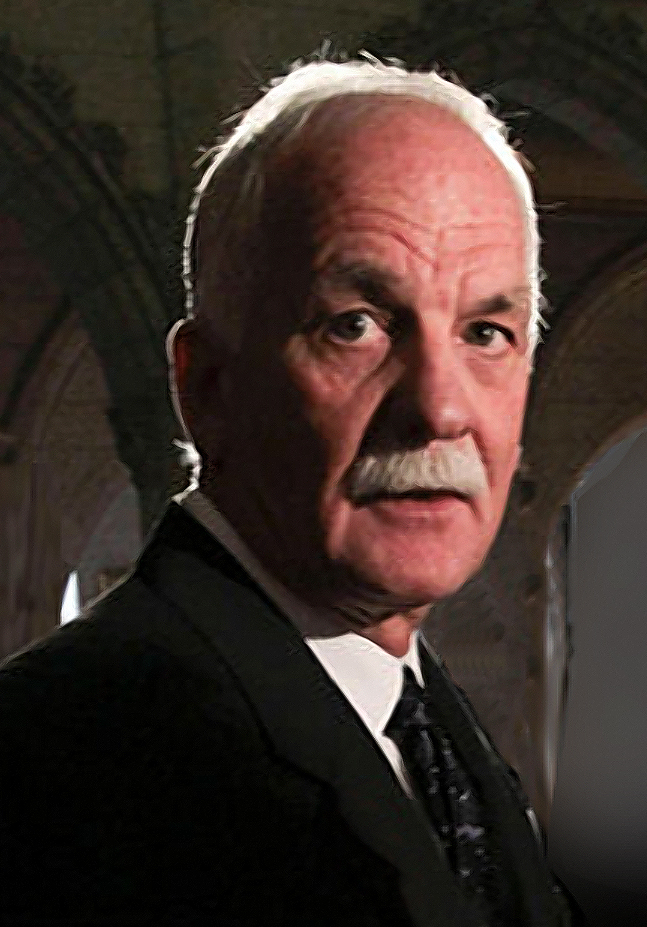
Vic Toews, Minister of Public Safety

Public safety minister Vic Toews, who introduced the bill, became a lightning rod for criticism after suggesting that an Opposition MP, Francis Scarpaleggia, had to choose to "either stand with us or with the child pornographers", a remark that was said to be "so far out whack with the standards of polite discourse that it kind of scared [supporters] off". The next day, on February 14, 2012, Vic Toews appeared on CTV News and denied that he ever made these comments, calling it "a far cry from that".

NDP MP Jasbir Sandhu commented that "We are often warned that rights and freedoms are not permanent, that we only keep them if we stand up and fight for them. However, when [we] stand up and fight to protect these rights..., we are accused of being sympathetic to child pornographers".

On Internet privacy, I’m with the child pornographers

— Margaret Wente, Globe and Mail columnist, February 16, 2012

Toews drew additional criticism after admitting that he had not entirely read the legislation that he put forward. NDP MP Charlie Angus asked "How can Canadians trust a minister who cannot even read his own legislation?".

As a consequence, Toews became a target of social media protests against the bill, including a Twitter campaign to inform him of Canadians' everyday mundane activities in an ironic bid to highlight their perceived loss of privacy if the bill should pass. Another Twitter user retrieved a copy of Toews's 2008 divorce particulars from the local Winnipeg courthouse and began spreading the contained information, which included details about his extramarital affairs with his family babysitter and a young Conservative staffer, the latter producing a child, as well as his spending habits, over the internet as retaliation to highlight the lack of privacy Toews' bill would afford Canadians. It was revealed that the IP address associated with the account originated within the House of Commons. Minister of Foreign Affairs John Baird suggested the account was a creation of the NDP playing a "dirty, sleazy, Internet game". and the account was quickly shut down, although later determined to belong to a Liberal staffer named Adam Carroll.

Logo of the Anonymous collective

In protest against Toews, the hacktivist collective Anonymous targeted him, revealing that he was having an affair, to highlight the dangers of anyone having warrantless access to Canadians' digital lives. Anonymous released the name of Vic Toews' mistress in a release on YouTube. The hacktivist collective declared, "Anonymous will not allow a politician who allows his citizens no secrets to have any secrets of his own" on a video uploaded to YouTube. The Anonymous group stated that it would be launching "Operation White North", and threatened to reveal further details from Toews's private life if the bill were not withdrawn. Bill C-30 was also one of the targets of the new initiative by Anonymous called "Operation Kill Billz".

The Royal Canadian Mounted Police stated that Toews had referred them to online threats from Anonymous, and that they were "pondering" an investigation.

== Withdrawal of bill ==
As a result of the opposition to the bill, the government referred it to the House Standing Committee on Justice and Human Rights for possible amendment before introducing it for second reading. The bill was quietly shelved during the summer of 2012. Citing public opposition, the government announced in February 2013 that the legislation had been withdrawn. Justice Minister Nicholson stated that the government had "listened to the concerns of Canadians who have been very clear on this and responding to that". He added, "We will not be proceeding with Bill C-30. And any attempts to modernize the criminal code will not contain …warrantless mandatory disclosure of basic subscriber information or the requirement for telecommunications service providers to build intercept capability within their systems."

Instead, in February 2013 the government introduced Bill C-55, a more limited bill which contained certain provisions which had been part of Bill C-30. The purpose of Bill C-55 was to bring Canada’s emergency wiretapping powers into conformity with a 2012 Supreme Court decision, R v Tee. In the decision, the Supreme Court held that the existing wiretap law was unconstitutional because it did not require police to inform those who had been wiretapped after the fact, nor provide for any other oversight of the police power. Bill C-55 provided that any persons subject to government surveillance or wiretapping in Canada must be informed of the surveillance after the fact. That bill received royal assent on March 27, 2013.

Later in 2013, the government introduced another bill dealing with access to electronic data. That bill, Bill C-13, did not include the provisions from Bill C-30 which had attracted the most criticism: the power for authorities to intercept data carried by telecommunications service providers, and to make warrantless requests for subscriber information from service providers. Bill C-13 passed in December 2014, under the name Protecting Canadians from Online Crime Act.
