= Manitoba Liberal Party candidates in the 1995 Manitoba provincial election =

Voters elected three Manitoba Liberal Party candidates to the Legislative Assembly of Manitoba in the 1995 provincial election. Some of the party's candidates have their own biography pages; information about others may be found here.

== Candidates ==
Riding	Candidate name	Notes	Residence	Occupation	Votes	%	Rank
Arthur-Virden	Murray Lee				1,258	16.14	3rd
Assiniboia	Allan Green				2,185	26.82	2nd
Brandon East	Elizabeth "Liz" Roberts				1,169	14.30	3rd
Brandon West	Mark Barber				1,789	19.77	3rd
Broadway	Fred De Villa				1,613	24.41	2nd
Burrows	Naty Yankech	Yankech first campaigned for the Manitoba legislature for the St. Johns division in a 1993 by-election. She was a 46-year-old licensed care giver, and ran a guest home for seniors with medical problems. She defeated Edson Sanecki to win the Liberal nomination, and lost to New Democratic Party candidate Gord Mackintosh in the general election. Yankech charged her former campaign manager with sexual assault following this election. She said that her manager had attacked her in his van, pinning her to the seat and kissing and fondling her, and that she fought back by "pretending to relent and then striking back when he relaxed". She also said that she was initially in shock, and decided to remain silent about the matter. She went police with the urgings of her Husband Victor Yankech, in December 1993, and her manager was convicted after a two-day trial. Yankech had the legal right to remain anonymous, but chose to inform the media of her situation. Former Liberal leader Sharon Carstairs praised her for her "courage and strength". Yankech defeated Sandi Funk to win the Liberal nomination for Burrows in the buildup to the 1995 election. Funk had actively sought the support of Yankech's former campaign manager, whom she believed to be innocent. After her victory, Yankech declared, "I defeated my assailant". She lost the general election to New Democratic Party incumbent Doug Martindale.		Licensed Caregiver, seniors guest home operator	1,024	14.55	3rd
Charleswood	Gail Watson				2,958	29.90	2nd
Concordia	Bret Dobbin				816	10.75	3rd
Crescentwood	Avis Gray				3,170	30.60	3rd
Dauphin	Ranjit Sarin				996	10.31	3rd
Elmwood	John S. Petryshyn	Petryshyn was born in Berlin, Germany, and moved to Canada as a child in 1948. He was a Bachelor of Arts degree from the University of Manitoba, and is a lawyer with the Winnipeg firm Luk Law. He was elected president of the Manitoba Liberal Party in 1979, at age 33, defeating rival candidate Beth Candlish by almost one hundred votes. He served in this capacity until 1982, and was appointed to the Immigration Appeal Board of Canada the following year. The board was eliminated by Brian Mulroney's government in 1989, and replaced with the Immigration and Refugee Board. Petryshyn and other Liberal-era appointees were offered two year "temporary appointments" on the new board if they agreed not to make any claims against the federal government for their lost positions. In 1993, a judge found that Petryshyn and the others had been treated in an unfair and coercive manner by the Mulroney government. Petryshyn later served as vice-president of the Ukrainian Canadian Congress, and as chairman of the Canadian-Ukraine relations committee. He announced the creation of the Canada-Ukraine Foundation in 1994, to finance projects in Ukraine. He is also active with Heritage Winnipeg. He sought election to the Manitoba legislature in 1995, and lost to New Democratic Party incumbent Jim Maloway. He also made an unsuccessful bid for election to the River East School Board later in the year. Petryshyn was president of the Liberal Party's Winnipeg—Transcona riding association in 2003, and was one of 259 presidents who endorsed Paul Martin's bid to seek the party leadership. In 2001, Petryshyn represented several Royal Canadian Legions in Manitoba in a lawsuit against the province and the city of Winnipeg over education taxes. He was an international observer for the 2004 Ukraine presidential election and 2006 Ukrainian parliamentary election, and has also overseen elections in Croatia, South Korea and Tajikistan.		Lawyer, Political party President, Non profit organization executive	1,227	15.26	3rd
Emerson	Lorne Hamblin				1,983	25.12	2nd
Flin Flon	Florence Allen				500	9.53	3rd
Fort Garry	Jim Woodman	Jim Woodman was a businessman and firefighter in Winnipeg. He was the general manager of Commission-Free Realty, which was involved in a bitter dispute with the rival Homeowners Private Sales Guide Inc. in 1999. Woodman sought election to the Winnipeg City Council in 1992, and was defeated by Bill Clement in the division of Charleswood-Fort Garry. He attracted some controversy while seeking the Fort Garry Liberal nomination in 1994, after releasing a brochure that ridiculed Progressive Conservative incumbent Rosemary Vodrey. The brochure was written in the style of a school report card, and said that Vodrey was "liked by everyone and [...] considered Miss Congeniality by her classmates. Everyone agrees that she is a snappy dresser and a swell person to invite to a party". Many considered this to be patronizing, and party leader Paul Edwards agreed that it was inappropriate. Others believed that Woodman was unfairly criticized. During the election, he used an electronic system called "Pollstergeist" to reach a larger number of voters and obtain useful polling data. He finished second against Progressive Conservative incumbent Rosemary Vodrey. Woodman later served as Terry Duguid's campaign manager in the 1995 Winnipeg mayoral election. Woodman died on April 22, 2004, from colon cancer caused by his work as a firefighter. His union, the United Fire Fighters of Winnipeg, sought to win retroactive workers compensation benefits for his family, noting that Woodman would have been covered had he lived in Alberta.	Winnipeg	Firefighter, Real Estate company executive	4,434	35.93	2nd
Gimli	Donald Glen "Don" Forfar				1,742	15.42	3rd
Gladstone	Eric Ezikot				1,454	19.49	2nd
Inkster	Kevin Lamoureux				4,394	50.80	1st
Interlake	Duncan Edward Geisler				766	10.34	3rd
Kildonan	Joe Gallagher				2,041	18.26	3rd
Kirkfield Park	Vic Wieler				2,616	26.45	2nd
La Verendrye	Marinus Van Osch				2,507	26.28	2nd
Lac du Bonnet	Bill Flett				1,039	9.91	3rd
Lakeside	Dorothy Hudson				1,373	17.92	3rd
Minnedosa	Elaine Shuttleworth				1,702	20.65	3rd
Morris	Bill Roth				2,329	25.09	2nd
Niakwa	Evelyne Reese				3,748	32.13	2nd
Osborne	Norma McCormick				2,978	30.66	2nd
Pembina	Walter Hoeppner				2,632	32.19	2nd
Point Douglas	Linda Cantiveros	Cantiveros is a prominent member of the Filipino community in Winnipeg. She has been an international division director of Agrif Global Training, Inc., has worked as editor of the Filipino Journal, and has served on the board of directors for the Philippine-Canadian Centre of Manitoba. She was a founding member of the Filipino-Canadian Business Council, and remains an active member of that organization. Cantiveros received 1,132 votes (23.05%) in 1995, finishing second against New Democratic Party candidate George Hickes. In 2002, she endorsed Mike Pagtakhan's successful bid to represent Point Douglas on the Winnipeg City Council.	Winnipeg	Community Leader, Business district board member	1,132	23.05	2nd
Portage la Prairie	Bob Turner	A 2003 report from the Manitoba Association of Teachers of English lists Bob Turner as having thirteen years experience as an S2-S4 English teacher, and working at Arthur Meighen High School in Portage la Prairie. It is likely that this is the same person. Turner received 2,117 votes (27.34%) in the 1995 election, finishing second against Progressive Conservative incumbent Brian Pallister.	Portage la Prairie	High School Teacher	2,117	27.34	2nd
Radisson	Art Miki		Winnipeg		2,401	25.55	2nd
Riel	Gord Steeves		Winnipeg	Lawyer, Former Winnipeg Blue Bomber	3,120	33.22	2nd
River East	Chris Walby				2,347	22.33	3rd
River Heights	Anita Neville			School Trustee	4,435	39.09	2nd
Roblin–Russell	Neil Stewart				1,239	14.35	3rd
Rossmere	Cecilia Connelly				875	9.31	3rd
Rupertsland	Harry Wood	Wood emphasized the need to develop a regional economy in Churchill. He received 1,018 votes (23.00%), finishing second against New Democratic Party candidate Eric Robinson. The Support Working Group of "Diabetes: A Manitoba Strategy" lists a Harry Wood of St. Theresa Point as a contributor. This is likely the same person.			1,018	23.00	2nd
Seine River	Bobbi Éthier				4,376	33.66	2nd
Selkirk	Elmer Keryluk				2,273	20.91	3rd
Springfield	Bob Singh				1,461	11.99	3rd
St. Boniface	Neil Gaudry				4,021	45.48	1st
St. James	Paul Edwards	Party Leader		Lawyer, politician	2,853	33.67	2nd
St. Johns	Bron Gorski				1,610	20.78	2nd
St. Norbert	Val Thompson				4,172	38.98	2nd
St. Vital	Tim Ryan				2,319	23.91	3rd
Ste. Rose	David Martin				1,133	15.66	3rd
Steinbach	Cornelius Goertzen				1,206	15.14	2nd
Sturgeon Creek	Bob Douglas	Douglas finished second against Progressive Conservative incumbent Gerry McAlpine.			3,051	31.47	2nd
Swan River	David Gray				559	6.44	3rd
The Maples	Gary Kowalski				4,254	48.08	1st
The Pas	Clem Jones				877	12.54	3rd
Thompson	Tim Johnston				926	15.79	3rd
Transcona	Ingrid Pokrant	Pokrant was the leader of Alliance Action, a women's health group. During the 1995 election, she argued against the taxpayer funding of abortions. She refused to use campaign signs, describing them as environmentally wasteful and a visual blight on the neighbourhood. She received 1,216 votes (13.69%), finishing third against New Democratic Party incumbent Daryl Reid.			1,216	13.69	3rd
Turtle Mountain	Doug Collins				1,735	22.10	2nd
Tuxedo	Rick Rosenberg				2,975	22.67	2nd
Wellington	Osmond Theodore Anderson	Osmond Theodore "O.T." Anderson (died December 7, 2002) was a community activist, chemistry teacher and vice-principal in Winnipeg. He moved to Canada from Jamaica in 1959, and received a Bachelor of Science degree from the University of Manitoba. Anderson worked in partnership with Les Latinecz to promote multicultural policies in Winnipeg during the 1960s, and became the first chair of the multicultural council on the Winnipeg One School Division in 1977. In 1984, he was appointed by Bill Norrie as chair of the mayor's race relations committee. Anderson was also chair of the Manitoba Multicultural Resources Centre, and a two-time president of the Caribbean Canadian Association. In 1990, Anderson served on a provincial council that examined the state of race relations in Manitoba. The council's report recommended that judges and politicians be required to attend sensitivity training courses, and called for the Manitoba Human Rights Commission to be given more powers. He later criticized a proposal made by the federal Liberal government of Jean Chrétien in 1994, in which the number of immigrants allowed into Canada would be reduced on an annual basis. Anderson said that the federal party had drifted too far to the right with this plan. Anderson received 1,996 votes (28.47%) in 1995, finishing second against New Democratic Party incumbent Becky Barrett. He later remarked that no political party in Manitoba had done an adequate job of recruiting candidates from minority communities.	Winnipeg	Community Activist, Teacher, Vice Principal	1,996	28.47	2nd
Wolseley	Marilyn MacKinnon				1,577	21.82	2nd

== By-elections ==
Riding	By-election date	Candidate name	Notes	Residence	Occupation	Votes	%	Rank
Portage la Prairie	September 30, 1997	Dave Quinn				1,657	25.52	2nd
Charleswood	April 28, 1998	Alana McKenzie				1,524	29.02	2nd
