= Daryl Reid =

Canadian politician

The Honourable Daryl Reid

29th Speaker of the Legislative Assembly of Manitoba
- In office October 20, 2011 – March 16, 2016
- Preceded by: George Hickes
- Succeeded by: Myrna Driedger

Member of the Legislative Assembly of Manitoba for Transcona
- In office September 11, 1990 – April 19, 2016
- Preceded by: Richard Kozak
- Succeeded by: Blair Yakimoski

Personal details
- Born: Daryl Gary Reid; November 2, 1950 (age 75) Winnipeg, Manitoba, Canada
- Party: New Democratic Party
- Occupation: Railroad worker, trade unionist, politician

Daryl Gary Reid, MLA (born November 2, 1950) is a former politician in Manitoba, Canada. He represented the electoral division of Transcona in the Legislative Assembly of Manitoba from 1990 to 2016, serving as a member of the New Democratic Party, and was the speaker of the Legislative Assembly from October 2011 to March 2016.

== Early life and career ==
Reid was born in Winnipeg, Manitoba, to a family that was politically active with the Cooperative Commonwealth Federation and New Democratic Party. He began working for Canadian National in 1969 and became active in the trade union movement, serving as a shop steward and executive board member for the International Brotherhood of Electrical Workers. From 1986 to 1990, he was the national president of his railway employees' association.

== Member of the Legislative Assembly ==
Reid was elected to the Manitoba legislature in the 1990 provincial election, defeating Liberal incumbent Richard Kozak. The Progressive Conservative Party won a majority government in this election, and Reid served as his party's critic for Transportation and the Workers' Compensation Board. In the latter capacity, he called for the WCB to adopt universal coverage. He later spoke against a proposed merger of Canadian National and Canadian Pacific, and strongly opposed the federal government's decision to privatize Canadian National.

Reid was re-elected without difficulty in the 1995 election, winning every poll in the Transcona division. The Progressive Conservatives were re-elected to another majority government, and Reid served as his party's critic for Transportation and Labour.

After eleven years in opposition, the New Democratic Party was returned to government in the 1999 provincial election. Reid was easily re-elected in Transcona, and became a backbench supporter of Gary Doer's administration. He led a task force into Manitoba's system of issuing driver's licenses, and chaired a series of public meetings into the status of the province's roads, rails and runways. Re-elected again in 2003, he chaired the committees that selected a new ombudsman and a new auditor general for Manitoba.

In 2005, Reid and fellow NDP MLA Bidhu Jha broke ranks with the Doer government and spoke against plans to create a new hog processing plant in their section of Winnipeg. After extensive criticism, the government withdrew its support for the project in 2007.

Reid was returned for a fifth time in the 2007 election, in which the NDP were re-elected to a third consecutive majority government. He now chairs the 2020 Manitoba Transportation Task Force, and serves on the board of directors of the Manitoba Public Insurance Corporation.

== Federal politics ==
Reid supported Lorne Nystrom's bid to lead the federal New Democratic Party in 1995. In 2003, he endorsed Bill Blaikie.

== Electoral history ==
2011 Manitoba general election: Transcona
Party	Candidate	Votes	%	±%	Expenditures
New Democratic	Daryl Reid	4,488	58.23	−10.50	$18,912.01
Progressive Conservative	Craig Stapon	2,668	34.62	+12.46	$18,099.59
Liberal	Faye McLeod-Jashyn	551	7.15	−1.96	$4,711.87
Total valid votes		7,707	99.47		
Rejected and declined ballots		41	0.53	+0.02	
Turnout		7,748	51.24	+2.44	
Electors on the lists		15,120			
New Democratic hold		Swing		-11.48	

2007 Manitoba general election: Transcona
Party	Candidate	Votes	%	±%	Expenditures
New Democratic	Daryl Reid	4,560	68.74	−0.74	$19,318.05
Progressive Conservative	Bryan McLeod	1,470	22.16	+7.76	$2,732.56
Liberal	Gerald Basarab	604	9.10	−7.01	$848.80
Total valid votes		6,634	99.49		
Rejected and declined ballots		34	0.51	-0.02	
Turnout		6,668	48.80	+0.26	
Electors on the lists		13,664			
New Democratic hold		Swing		-4.25	

2003 Manitoba general election: Transcona
Party	Candidate	Votes	%	±%	Expenditures
New Democratic	Daryl Reid	4,414	69.48	+5.60	$16,221.57
Liberal	Betty Ann Watts	1,024	16.12	+8.01	$12,517.46
Progressive Conservative	Nansy Marsiglia	915	14.40	−12.98	$10.69
Total valid votes		6,353	99.47		
Rejected and declined ballots		34	0.53	+0.12	
Turnout		6,387	48.54	−19.44	
Electors on the lists		13,157			
New Democratic hold		Swing		-1.21	

1999 Manitoba general election: Transcona
Party	Candidate	Votes	%	±%	Expenditures
New Democratic	Daryl Reid	5,620	63.88	+5.75	$13,949.00
Progressive Conservative	Dan Turner	2,409	27.38	+0.68	$19,315.42
Liberal	Vibart Stewart	713	8.10	-5.59	$2,987.81
Communist	Paul Sidon	56	0.64		$0.00
Total valid votes		8,798	99.59		
Rejected and declined ballots		36	0.41	+0.17	
Turnout		8,834	67.98		
Electors on the lists		12,995			
New Democratic hold		Swing		+2.54	

1995 Manitoba general election: Transcona
Party	Candidate	Votes	%	±%	Expenditures
New Democratic	Daryl Reid	5,163	58.13	+8.64	$16,554.00
Progressive Conservative	Richard Bueckert	2,372	26.71	+7.06	$7,384.15
Liberal	Ingrid Pokrant	1,216	13.69	−15.28	$9,521.05
Independent	Jack D. Lang	131	1.47		$121.01
Total valid votes		8,882	99.76		
Rejected and declined ballots		21	0.24	+0.01	
Turnout		8,903	68.47	−1.76	
Electors on the lists		13,003			
New Democratic hold		Swing		+0.79	

1990 Manitoba general election: Transcona
Party	Candidate	Votes	%	±%
New Democratic	Daryl Reid	4,363	49.48	+15.83
Liberal	Richard Kozak	2,554	28.97	-12.16
Progressive Conservative	Ray Hargreaves	1,732	19.64	-4.30
Progressive	Thomas Bunn	168	1.91	
Total valid votes		8,817	99.77	
Rejected and declined ballots		20	0.23	+0.18
Turnout		8,837	70.22	−7.49
Electors on the lists		12,584		
New Democratic gain from Liberal		Swing		+14.00

All electoral information is taken from Elections Manitoba.
