= Auch (name) =

Auch is a family name which has two possible origins, one originating in southern Germany and the other in France.

The name Auch is common in Southern Germany as an occupational surname for those who watched livestock at night, from the Middle High German Uhte, which means "night watch", "night pasture", or "the time just before dawn".

The second origin is as a habitational name from the southern French town of Auch.

== Notable people named Auch ==
- Susan Auch (born 1966), Canadian Olympic speed skater
- Georges Bataille (1892–1962), French 20th century novelist who published the first three editions of 'The Story of the Eye' under the name of Lord Auch.
- Eva-Maria Auch, German professor and author who specializes in Eastern European history, religion and politics
