= Minister of Environment =

Minister of Environment may refer to:

- Minister of Environment (Finland)
- Minister of Environment (Manitoba)
- Minister of Environment (Sri Lanka)

== See also ==
- List of environmental ministries
