= Alan Patterson =

Alan Patterson may refer to:

- Alan Patterson (field hockey) (born 1941), New Zealand field hockey player
- Alan Patterson (athlete) (1886–1916), British sprint athlete
- Alan Patterson (motorcyclist), driver at the 1991 Australian motorcycle Grand Prix

== See also ==
- Alan Paterson (1928–1999), British high jumper
- Alan Paterson (footballer) (born 1954), Northern Irish footballer and 1988 Northern Ireland Football Writers' Association Player of the Year
- Allan Patterson (1919–2009), Canadian politician
- Allan Pettersson (1911–1980), Swedish composer
