= Herold Driedger =

Canadian politician (1942–2024)

Herold Leonhard Driedger (March 28, 1942 – October 1, 2024) was a politician in the Canadian province of Manitoba. He was a member of the Legislative Assembly of Manitoba from 1988 to 1990, representing the Winnipeg riding of Niakwa for the Manitoba Liberal Party.

Driedger worked as a teacher before entering public life. He first sought election to the Manitoba legislature in the 1986 provincial election, running for Sidney Green's Progressive Party in the riding of Radisson. He received only 240 votes, as against 4,810 for the winning candidate, New Democrat Gerard Lecuyer.

In the 1988 provincial election, he ran as a Liberal in Niakwa and defeated incumbent Progressive Conservative Abe Kovnats by 1354 votes. The Liberals increased their parliamentary representation from one to twenty in this election, and Driedger sat in the official opposition benches for the next two years. In the 1990 election, he was defeated by Progressive Conservative candidate Louise Dacquay in the redistributed riding of Seine River by 47 votes, amid a general loss of support for the Liberal Party. He did not seek out a return to political life since then.

In 1989-90, Driedger served as the first vice-president of the Canadian Council of Public Accountants (the president was Loyola Hearn, who was later a Conservative MP in the House of Commons of Canada). He was also a member of the Canadian Prostate Cancer Network.

== Election results ==
1986 Manitoba general election: Radisson
Party	Candidate	Votes	%	±%
New Democratic	Gerard Lecuyer	4,810	53.71	-13.78
Progressive Conservative	Brian Benoit	2,666	29.77	+1.42
Liberal	Allan Patterson	1,239	13.84	New
Progressive	Herold Driedger	240	2.68	-1.47
Total valid votes		8,955	99.63	+0.03
Rejected		33	0.37	-0.03
Eligible voters / Turnout		12,924	69.55	-6.62
New Democratic hold		Swing		-7.60
Source(s) Source: Manitoba. Chief Electoral Officer (1999). Statement of Votes for the 37th Provincial General Election, September 21, 1999 (PDF) (Report). Winnipeg: Elections Manitoba.

1988 Manitoba general election: Niakwa
Party	Candidate	Votes	%	±%
Liberal	Herold Driedger	8,576	47.48	+
Progressive Conservative	Abe Kovnats	7,222	39.99	-
New Democratic	Stan Williams	2,026	11.22	-
Western Independence	Lyle Cruickshank	237	1.31	
Total valid votes		18,061	100.00	-
Rejected ballots		21	–	–
Turnout		18,082	79.64	
Eligible voters		22,705		
Source: Elections Manitoba

Preceded by Abe Kovnats	Member of the Manitoba Legislative Assembly for Niakwa; 1988–1990	Succeeded by Jack Reimer
