= Shannon Corbett =

Canadian politician from Manitoba

Shannon Corbett MLA

Member of the Legislative Assembly of Manitoba for Transcona
- Incumbent
- Assumed office March 18, 2025
- Preceded by: Nello Altomare

Personal details
- Born: Shannon Erin Corbett; November 8, 1971 (age 54)
- Party: New Democratic
- Education: Valley City State University
- Occupation: Teacher; politician

Shannon Erin Corbett is a Canadian politician, who was elected to the Legislative Assembly of Manitoba in a provincial by-election. She represents the district of Transcona as a member of the Manitoba New Democratic Party.

Until her election she was a vice-principal at Transcona Collegiate Institute.

== Electoral results ==
Manitoba provincial by-election, March 18, 2025: Transcona Death of Nello Altomare
Party	Candidate	Votes	%	±%
New Democratic	Shannon Corbett	3,616	64.46	+5.95
Progressive Conservative	Shawn Nason	1,569	27.97	-7.48
Liberal	Brad Boudreau	217	3.87	-2.18
Independent	Susan Auch	208	3.71	–
Total valid votes		5,610	99.63	–
Total rejected and declined ballots		21	0.37	-0.14
Turnout		5,631	31.44	-19.96
Eligible voters		17,910		
New Democratic hold		Swing		+6.72
