= Richard Kozak =

Canadian politician

Member of the Legislative Assembly of Manitoba for Transcona
- In office April 26, 1988 – September 11, 1990
- Preceded by: Wilson Parasiuk
- Succeeded by: Daryl Reid

Personal details
- Born: September 20, 1949 (age 77) Saint Boniface, Manitoba, Canada
- Party: Liberal
- Education: University of Winnipeg Université Laval University of Toronto
- Occupation: Financial planner, politician

Richard Kozak (born September 20, 1949 in Saint Boniface, Manitoba) is a politician in Manitoba, Canada. He was a member of the Legislative Assembly of Manitoba from 1988 to 1990, representing the eastern Winnipeg riding of Transcona for the Manitoba Liberal Party.

Kozak was educated in Political Science at the University of Winnipeg, French at Université Laval and Political Economy at the University of Toronto. He worked as a financial planner before entering political life.

In the Manitoba provincial election of 1988, Kozak was elected in Transcona over incumbent New Democrat Wilson Parasiuk by 709 votes. The seat had previously been regarded as safe for the NDP. The Liberals increased their parliamentary strength from one to twenty in this election, and Kozak served as his party's Finance Critic and Deputy House Leader for the next two years. Support for the NDP rebounded in the 1990 provincial election, and Kozak lost to NDP candidate Daryl Reid by almost 2,000 votes. He has not sought a return to political life since this time.

== Election results ==
1988 Manitoba general election: Transcona
Party	Candidate	Votes	%
Liberal	Richard Kozak	3,900	41.13
New Democratic	Wilson Parasiuk	3,191	33.65
Progressive Conservative	Bill Omiucke	2,270	23.94
Independent	Ray Hargreaves	121	1.28

1990 Manitoba general election: Transcona
Party	Candidate	Votes	%	±%
New Democratic	Daryl Reid	4,363	49.48	+15.83
Liberal	Richard Kozak	2,554	28.97	-12.16
Progressive Conservative	Ray Hargreaves	1,732	19.64	-4.30
Progressive	Thomas Bunn	168	1.91	
Total valid votes		8,817	99.77	
Rejected and declined ballots		20	0.23	+0.18
Turnout		8,837	70.22	−7.49
Electors on the lists		12,584		
New Democratic gain from Liberal		Swing		+14.00
