= Transcona (electoral district) =

Provincial electoral district in Manitoba, Canada

Coordinates: 49.893°N 97.006°W

Manitoba electoral district
- Location in Winnipeg

Provincial electoral district
- Legislature: Legislative Assembly of Manitoba
MLA
Shannon Corbett
New Democratic
- District created: 1968
- First contested: 1969
- Last contested: 2023

Demographics
- Population (2016): 22,920
- Electors (2019): 16,701
- Area (km²): 28
- Pop. density (per km²): 818.6
- Census subdivision: Winnipeg

Transcona is a provincial electoral district of Manitoba, Canada. The riding was created by redistribution in 1968, and has formally existed since the 1969 provincial election. It was created out of Radisson and a small slice of Springfield.

The riding is named after and contains Transcona, a neighbourhood in the easternmost tip of the city of Winnipeg. It is bordered to the southwest by Southdale, the west by St. Boniface and Radisson, and in all other directions by the rural riding of Springfield-Ritchot.

The population in 1996 was 19,648. The average family income in 1999 was $50,089, with an unemployment rate of 6.70%. About seven percent of the riding's population are Ukrainian Canadians.

The riding is primarily working-class, and includes the Canadian National Railway rail yards. Fifteen percent of the riding's industry is in the manufacturing sector, with a further 14% in retail trade.

The former New Democratic Party (NDP) party leader Russell Paulley represented the riding for the first eight years of its legal existence. Candidates from the NDP have won Transcona in all but two of the provincial elections (1988 and 2016, both of which coincided with large provincewide declines in NDP support) in which it has participated since 1969.

== Members of the Legislative Assembly ==
Parliament	Years	Member	Party
Riding created from Radisson, and Springfield
29th	1969–1973	Russell Paulley	New Democratic
30th	1973–1977	Russell Paulley	New Democratic
31st	1977–1981	Wilson Parasiuk	New Democratic
32nd	1981–1986	Wilson Parasiuk	New Democratic
33rd	1986–1988	Wilson Parasiuk	New Democratic
34th	1988–1990	Richard Kozak	Liberal
35th	1990–1995	Daryl Reid	New Democratic
36th	1995–1999	Daryl Reid	New Democratic
37th	1999–2003	Daryl Reid	New Democratic
38th	2003–2007	Daryl Reid	New Democratic
39th	2007–2011	Daryl Reid	New Democratic
40th	2011–2016	Daryl Reid	New Democratic
41st	2016–2019	Blair Yakimoski	Progressive Conservative
42nd	2019–2023	Nello Altomare	New Democratic
43rd	2023–2025	Nello Altomare	New Democratic
43rd	2025–present	Shannon Corbett	New Democratic

== Electoral results ==
Manitoba provincial by-election, March 18, 2025 Death of Nello Altomare
Party	Candidate	Votes	%	±%	Expenditures
New Democratic	Shannon Corbett	3,616	64.46	+5.95	
Progressive Conservative	Shawn Nason	1,569	27.97	-7.48	
Liberal	Brad Boudreau	217	3.87	-2.18	
Independent	Susan Auch	208	3.71	–	
Total valid votes		5,610	99.63	–	
Total rejected and declined ballots		21	0.37	-0.14	
Turnout		5,631	31.44	-19.96	
Eligible voters		17,962			
New Democratic hold		Swing		+6.72	

2023 Manitoba general election
Party	Candidate	Votes	%	±%	Expenditures
New Democratic	Nello Altomare	5,235	58.50	+12.09	$23,820.41
Progressive Conservative	Titi Tijani	3,172	35.45	-9.68	$33,125.35
Liberal	Arthur Bloomfield	541	6.05	-2.41	$0.00
Total valid votes/expense limit		8,948	99.49	–	$68,202.00
Total rejected and declined ballots		46	0.51	–0.37	
Turnout		8,994	51.40	-1.05	
Eligible voters		17,498			
New Democratic hold		Swing		+10.88	
Source(s) Source: Elections Manitoba

2019 Manitoba general election
Party	Candidate	Votes	%	±%	Expenditures
New Democratic	Nello Altomare	4,030	46.42	+18.2	$15,870.22
Progressive Conservative	Blair Yakimoski	3,918	45.13	-4.7	$28,026.59
Liberal	Dylan Bekkering	734	8.45	-10.1	$0.00
Total valid votes		8,682	99.12		
Total rejected ballots		47	0.88		
Turnout		8,759	52.45		
Eligible voters		16,701			
New Democratic gain from Progressive Conservative		Swing		+11.4	
Source(s) Source: Elections Manitoba and CBC News

2016 provincial election redistributed results
Party	%
Progressive Conservative	49.8
New Democratic	28.2
Liberal	18.6
Others	3.5

2016 Manitoba general election
Party	Candidate	Votes	%	±%	Expenditures
Progressive Conservative	Blair Yakimoski	3,948	49.38	+14.76	$33,019.24
New Democratic	Barb Burkowski	2,281	28.53	-29.70	$42,927.60
Liberal	Chad Panting	1,465	18.32	+11.17	$15,578.42
Manitoba	Ajit Kumar	233	2.91		$5,194.78
Communist	Darrell Rankin	68	0.85		$33.60
Total valid votes/expense limit		7,995	97.97	$	
Total rejected ballots		166	2.03	+1.50	
Turnout		8,161	55.98	+4.74	
Eligible voters		14,578			
Source: Elections Manitoba
Progressive Conservative gain from New Democratic		Swing		+22,23	

2011 Manitoba general election
Party	Candidate	Votes	%	±%	Expenditures
New Democratic	Daryl Reid	4,488	58.23	−10.50	$18,912.01
Progressive Conservative	Craig Stapon	2,668	34.62	+12.46	$18,099.59
Liberal	Faye McLeod-Jashyn	551	7.15	−1.96	$4,711.87
Total valid votes		7,707	99.47		
Rejected and declined ballots		41	0.53	+0.02	
Turnout		7,748	51.24	+2.44	
Electors on the lists		15,120			
New Democratic hold		Swing		-11.48	

2007 Manitoba general election
Party	Candidate	Votes	%	±%	Expenditures
New Democratic	Daryl Reid	4,560	68.74	−0.74	$19,318.05
Progressive Conservative	Bryan McLeod	1,470	22.16	+7.76	$2,732.56
Liberal	Gerald Basarab	604	9.10	−7.01	$848.80
Total valid votes		6,634	99.49		
Rejected and declined ballots		34	0.51	-0.02	
Turnout		6,668	48.80	+0.26	
Electors on the lists		13,664			
New Democratic hold		Swing		-4.25	

2003 Manitoba general election
Party	Candidate	Votes	%	±%	Expenditures
New Democratic	Daryl Reid	4,414	69.48	+5.60	$16,221.57
Liberal	Betty Ann Watts	1,024	16.12	+8.01	$12,517.46
Progressive Conservative	Nansy Marsiglia	915	14.40	−12.98	$10.69
Total valid votes		6,353	99.47		
Rejected and declined ballots		34	0.53	+0.12	
Turnout		6,387	48.54	−19.44	
Electors on the lists		13,157			
New Democratic hold		Swing		-1.21	

1999 Manitoba general election
Party	Candidate	Votes	%	±%	Expenditures
New Democratic	Daryl Reid	5,620	63.88	+5.75	$13,949.00
Progressive Conservative	Dan Turner	2,409	27.38	+0.68	$19,315.42
Liberal	Vibart Stewart	713	8.10	-5.59	$2,987.81
Communist	Paul Sidon	56	0.64		$0.00
Total valid votes		8,798	99.59		
Rejected and declined ballots		36	0.41	+0.17	
Turnout		8,834	67.98		
Electors on the lists		12,995			
New Democratic hold		Swing		+2.54	

1995 Manitoba general election
Party	Candidate	Votes	%	±%	Expenditures
New Democratic	Daryl Reid	5,163	58.13	+8.64	$16,554.00
Progressive Conservative	Richard Bueckert	2,372	26.71	+7.06	$7,384.15
Liberal	Ingrid Pokrant	1,216	13.69	−15.28	$9,521.05
Independent	Jack D. Lang	131	1.47		$121.01
Total valid votes		8,882	99.76		
Rejected and declined ballots		21	0.24	+0.01	
Turnout		8,903	68.47	−1.76	
Electors on the lists		13,003			
New Democratic hold		Swing		+0.79	

1990 Manitoba general election
Party	Candidate	Votes	%	±%
New Democratic	Daryl Reid	4,363	49.48	+15.83
Liberal	Richard Kozak	2,554	28.97	-12.16
Progressive Conservative	Ray Hargreaves	1,732	19.64	-4.30
Progressive	Thomas Bunn	168	1.91	
Total valid votes		8,817	99.77	
Rejected and declined ballots		20	0.23	+0.18
Turnout		8,837	70.22	−7.49
Electors on the lists		12,584		
New Democratic gain from Liberal		Swing		+14.00

1988 Manitoba general election
Party	Candidate	Votes	%	±%
Liberal	Richard Kozak	3,900	41.13	+25.74
New Democratic	Wilson Parasiuk	3,191	33.65	-25.74
Progressive Conservative	Bill Omiucke	2,270	23.94	-1.27
Independent	Ray Hargreaves	121	1.28	
Total valid votes		9,482	99.96	
Rejected and declined ballots		4	0.04	-0.15
Turnout		9,486	77.72	+12.16
Electors on the lists		12,206		
Liberal gain from New Democratic		Swing		+25.74

1986 Manitoba general election
Party	Candidate	Votes	%	±%
New Democratic	Wilson Parasiuk	4,631	59.39	-12.17
Progressive Conservative	Earl Swayzie	1,966	25.21	-1.79
Liberal	Bob Lee	1,200	15.39	
Total valid votes		7,797	99.81	
Rejected and declined ballots		15	0.19	-0.02
Turnout		7,812	65.56	-6.43
Electors on the lists		11,916		
New Democratic hold		Swing		-5.19

1981 Manitoba general election
Party	Candidate	Votes	%	±%
New Democratic	Wilson Parasiuk	6,013	71.57	+17.57
Progressive Conservative	Jo Lopuck	2,269	27.01	-12.60
Progressive	Albert Smaczylo	120	1.43	
Total valid votes		8,402	99.79	
Rejected and declined ballots		18	0.21	+0.05
Turnout		8,420	71.98	-5.96
Electors on the lists		11,697		
New Democratic hold		Swing		+15.09

1977 Manitoba general election
Party	Candidate	Votes	%	±%
New Democratic	Wilson Parasiuk	6,474	53.99	-6.19
Progressive Conservative	Tony Leonard	4,749	39.61	-0.12
Liberal	Douglas Dennison	767	6.40	
Total valid votes		11,990	99.83	
Rejected and declined ballots		20	0.17	-0.40
Turnout		12,010	77.95	-3.38
Electors on the lists		15,408		
New Democratic hold		Swing		-2.99

1973 Manitoba general election
Party	Candidate	Votes	%	±%
New Democratic	Russell Paulley	6,275	60.19	-4.31
Progressive Conservative	Phil Rizzuto	4,151	39.81	+25.11
Total valid votes		10,426	99.44	
Rejected and declined ballots		59	0.56	+0.21
Turnout		10,485	81.32	+15.08
Electors on the lists		12,893		
New Democratic hold		Swing		-14.71

1969 Manitoba general election
Party	Candidate	Votes	%
New Democratic	Russell Paulley	4,614	64.50
Liberal	Thelma Call	1,488	20.80
Progressive Conservative	Kenn Gunn-Walberg	1,052	14.71
Total valid votes		7,154	99.65
Rejected and declined ballots		25	0.35
Turnout		7,179	66.25
Electors on the lists		10,837	

== Previous boundaries ==
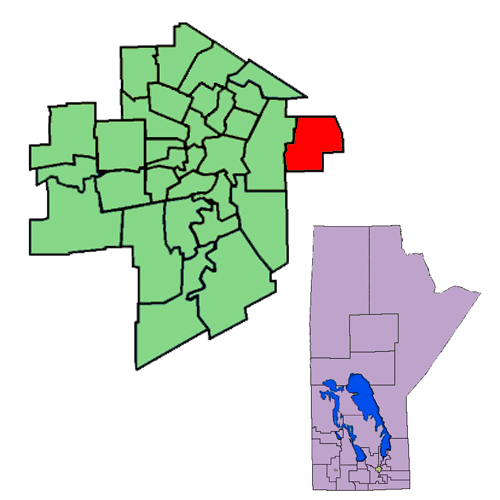
The 1999–2011 boundaries for Transcona highlighted in red.

== See also ==
- List of Manitoba provincial electoral districts
- Canadian provincial electoral districts
