= Wilson Parasiuk =

Canadian politician

Member of the Legislative Assembly of Manitoba for Transcona
- In office October 11, 1977 – April 26, 1988
- Preceded by: Russell Paulley
- Succeeded by: Richard Kozak

Personal details
- Born: May 6, 1943 (age 83) Stenen, Saskatchewan, Canada
- Spouse: Wilma Dorthy Hewitson (m. 1967)
- Education: University of Manitoba (BAHons) (MA); Oxford University

Wilson Dwight Peter Parasiuk (/ˈpærəsuːk/; born May 6, 1943) is a Canadian businessman and former politician.

As founder and CEO of the Paralink Group of Companies, based in the Vancouver area, Parasiuk organizes private sector/public sector partnerships in the export of Canada's health care, education and governmental expertise. Paralink also provides advice on energy development matters within Canada and internationally. In his early career as a politician, he was an elected member of the Legislative Assembly of Manitoba, Canada, from 1977 to 1988 and a cabinet minister in the New Democratic Party government of Howard Pawley from 1981 to 1988.

== Early life and education ==
Born in Stenen, Saskatchewan, Canada into a farming family, the son of William Peter Parasiuk and Lillian Gogal, he moved with his family to Transcona, a Winnipeg suburb (now part of the city), when he was five. Parasiuk went on to obtain a Bachelor of Arts (Honours) and Master of Arts, Political Science and International Relations at the University of Manitoba and subsequently became a Rhodes Scholar (Manitoba 1966), studying at Oxford University (also playing for the University's ice hockey team in 1967 and 1968) and obtaining a Master of Arts at St.John's College. In 1967, Parasiuk married Wilma Dorothy Hewitson.

== Early public career (1968-1988) ==
Parasiuk returned to Canada in 1968 and worked for the Canadian federal government's Department of Regional Economic Expansion as an Economic Development Planner in Ottawa, Ontario.

In 1970, Parasiuk returned to Winnipeg, Manitoba, and began work with the Provincial Government of Manitoba. Appointed Assistant Deputy Minister for the Cabinet Planning Secretariat by then Premier Edward Schreyer, Parasiuk held several positions over the following years, including Cabinet Sub-Committee on Economic and Resource Development, Chairman of the Lake Winnipeg Management Board, Chairman of Northern Manpower Corporation, Deputy Minister to the Premier and Deputy Minister to the Cabinet Planning Secretariat.

From 1971 to 1977, Parasiuk was Chairman of the Leaf Rapids Development Corporation, Chairman of the Communities Economic Development Fund and Ex Officio Member of the Boards of Crown Corporations of the Government of Manitoba. Parasiuk led the development of the community of Leaf Rapids, Manitoba.

Parasiuk first ran for the Manitoba legislature in the provincial election of 1973, losing to Progressive Conservative candidate Donald Craik by about 2,000 votes in the suburban Winnipeg riding of Riel. In the 1977 election, he was elected in his home riding, the traditional New Democratic Party stronghold of Transcona in east Winnipeg, even as the NDP government of Edward Schreyer was defeated by the Progressive Conservatives under Sterling Lyon.

In 1979 Parasiuk went to China on a fact-finding tour led by prominent New Democrat, Tommy Douglas. This led to a lifelong interest and activities in an emerging China and the impact of this emergence on the rest of the world. Parasiuk remained neutral in the Manitoba NDP leadership race which ultimately elected Howard Pawley as party leader. Parasiuk was easily re-elected in the 1981 election, as Pawley's NDP won a majority government. Parasiuk had acted as the Co-Chairman of the election campaign with Eugene Kostyra.

On November 30, 1981, Parasiuk was named Minister of Energy and Mines with responsibility for Manitoba Hydro, the Development Corporation Act, Manitoba Data Services and Manfor Resources Ltd. On January 20, 1982, he was also named Minister for Crown Investments. He was relieved of the DCA and MDS responsibilities on May 19, 1982, and the Crown Investments portfolio and the Manfor responsibility on November 4, 1983.

As Minister Responsible for Manitoba Hydro, Parasiuk was instrumental in organizing an electricity export sales agreement with Northern States Power in Minnesota which led to the development of the Limestone hydro-electric dam and generating station in northern Manitoba. The dam development and its economic spin-offs had influence in the re-election of the Pawley government March 18, 1986.

Parasiuk was easily re-elected in the 1986 provincial election. He resigned his portfolios on May 20, 1986, amid a conflict-of-interest allegation, but was reinstated on August 29, 1986 after his name was cleared by the Honourable Samuel Freedman, the retired Chief Justice of the Manitoba Court of Appeal. On September 21, 1987, he was appointed Minister of Health, with responsibility for Sport, the Boxing and Wrestling Commission Act and the Fitness and Amateur Sports Act.

Parasiuk had not intended to run again in the next election, expected sometime in 1990. However, the 1988 election, brought on by the unexpected defeat of the government in the legislature, left Parasiuk no option but to run in his Transcona riding. During this election, Pawley resigned as leader and Parasiuk supported Gary Doer as Pawley's replacement. The NDP lost power in 1988 and Parasiuk himself was upset by Richard Kozak in the 1988 election, and has not sought a return to political life since then.

== Private and public sector career and activities (1989-present) ==
Parasiuk moved from Winnipeg, Manitoba, to the Lower Mainland of British Columbia in 1989, accepting the position of founding President of Vancity Enterprises, a real estate investment and development subsidiary of Vancouver City Savings Credit Union. Under his leadership, Vancity Enterprises went through a start-up with developments such as private residences providing assisted care at Queens Park Hospital, subsidized housing located over a Vancity Community branch and the Vancouver City Savings Credit Union Headquarters, constructed on previously unusable land due to the Skytrain rapid transit unit, which now passes through the building.

In 1992, Parasiuk was hired by the government of then British Columbia Premier Michael Harcourt to work as Chair and Chief Executive Officer of the British Columbia Trade Development Corporation until he left in 1995. Parasiuk was an advocate of developing Vancouver as the gateway to Asia and focused on expanding trade and investment to and from Asia, especially China and India. He also pursued the expansion of the film industry in B.C.

Parasiuk was the Director of Quorum Growth Inc., then a publicly traded venture capital company, from 1993 to 1997, Director of Quorum Growth International Ltd. from 1994 to 2000 and was named President of Quorum Funding International in 1995. From 1995 to 1997, Parasiuk was Chairman of the British Columbia International Power Group Inc.

During his entire career, Parasiuk has been a board member for several private, non-profit and public organizations outside of his primary work activities. From 1989 to 1991, Parasiuk was a Director of the Canada West Foundation and in 1992 acted as Moderator for the B.C. Premier's Summit on Trade and Economic Opportunity. He was a member of the World Economic Forum from 1992 to 1995, as well as a member, from 1992 to 1998, of the Prime Minister's Advisory Committee on Government Restructuring (now the Advisory Committee on the Public Service) and Director of the Public Policy Forum during that time.

Parasiuk has remained active in health-care policy research in Canada, having been a Director of Interhealth Canada Ltd. from 1994 to 2002 and Chairman of Interhealth Canada (China) Inc. from 1995 to 2003 and Chairman of the Beijing Toronto International Hospital Co-operative Joint Venture from 1996 to 2001, the first-ever private healthcare facility in Beijing, China. This project has not been completed due in large part to funding problems brought on by the 1997 Asian financial crisis.

In 1999, Parasiuk became the Managing Director of Interhealth Canada Limited Abu Dhabi, overseeing the start-up of the then Sheikh Khalifa Medical Center, a 335-bed, 1500 staff, accredited Western standard international hospital, now known as the Sheikh Khalifa Medical Pavilion, a central piece in the Sheikh Khalifa Medical City. When Parasiuk left Interhealth Canada Limited in 2002, he held the positions of Vice-Chairman of the Board, President and CEO.

Since 1995, Parasiuk and his company, Paralink Management Ltd., have been involved in organizing private/public sector partnerships in the export of Canada's expertise with emphasis on Canada's healthcare, education and civics expertise. Paralink also provides advice on energy development matters. The Paralink group of companies are also involved in the recruitment and placement of foreign workers in Canada.

Parasiuk has not remained active in partisan politics, although in 2003 he publicly supported Bill Blaikie's campaign to lead the federal New Democratic Party.

Married since 1967 to Wilma Dorothy Parasiuk (née Hewitson), also of Winnipeg, Manitoba, he has two children and resides in the Vancouver area.
