= Namumkin =

- Directed by: Hrishikesh Mukherjee
- Written by: D. N. Mukherjee (story); Bidhu Jha (screenplay)
- Produced by: Bidhu Jha
- Starring: Raj Babbar; Vinod Mehra; Zeenat Aman; Sanjeev Kumar; Om Shivpuri
- Cinematography: Vic Sarin
- Edited by: V. S. Ohm; Anil Saxena
- Music by: Rahul Dev Burman
- Release date: 2 December 1988
- Country: India
- Language: Hindi

Namumkin (Impossible) is a 1988 Bollywood mystery film, telling the story of an Asian family exiled from Idi Amin's Uganda. The screenplay was written by Bidhu Jha, who was later elected to the Legislative Assembly of Manitoba.

== Plot ==
Shobha marries a Canada-based big wealthy businessman Ashok Saxena almost twice her age. On the wedding night, Ashok dies by falling out of his balcony.

Sunil Kapoor and his associate get involved in an investigation due to the one million dollars insurance policy of Ashok. His death seems mysterious as the autopsy report mentions heavy alcohol consumption while Ashok Saxena was known to be a complete teetotaler.

Sunil's friend Shakti Kaul who was earlier engaged to Shobha flies down to Canada. Together they start an investigation the circumstances and cause of Saxena's death.

== Production ==
The film was shot entirely in Winnipeg.

== Cast ==
- Sanjeev Kumar as Joseph D'Souza
- Zeenat Aman as Shobha
- Vinod Mehra as Shakti Kaul
- Raj Babbar as Sunil Kapoor
- Shreeram Lagoo as Ashok Saxena
- Om Shivpuri as Mr. Mathur

== Soundtrack ==
Song	Singer
"Saathi Aisa Lagta Hai"	Lata Mangeshkar
"Bahut Door Hoke"	Kishore Kumar
"Ae Zindagi Hui Kahan Bhool"	Kishore Kumar
"Ae Zindagi" (Female)	Anuradha Paudwal
"Ae Zindagi Kya Hai Tere Khel"	Kishore Kumar
