= Marianne Cerilli =

Canadian politician (born 1961)

Member of the Legislative Assembly of Manitoba for Radisson
- In office September 11, 1990 – June 3, 2003
- Preceded by: Allan Patterson
- Succeeded by: Bidhu Jha

Personal details
- Born: 1961 (age 64–65) Toronto, Ontario
- Party: New Democrat
- Education: University of Manitoba (B.Ed.) (BPE)
- Occupation: Youth counsellor

Marianne Cerilli (born 1961) is a politician in Manitoba, Canada. She served as a New Democratic member of the Manitoba legislature from 1990 until 2003, though she was not called to cabinet when the party formed government in 1999.

Cerilli was born in Toronto, raised in Winnipeg, and was educated at the University of Manitoba (from which she holds a B.P.E. and a Bachelor of Education degree). Before entering political life, she worked as a high school athletics coach, and was a counsellor in the Winnipeg School Division. She also worked at the Unemployed Health Centre of Winnipeg, and was a consultant to Manitoba Employment and Youth Services for three years.

== Political career ==
Cerilli initially intended to run for the NDP in the centre Winnipeg riding of Broadway in the 1990 provincial election, but lost the party nomination to Conrad Santos by one vote. She instead ran in the northeast Winnipeg riding of Radisson, where she defeated Progressive Conservative candidate Mike Thompson by almost 1,500 votes (incumbent Liberal MLA Allan Patterson finished third). The Progressive Conservatives won the general election, and Cerilli joined nineteen other New Democrats in the official opposition. At the time she was the youngest woman ever elected to the Manitoba legislature.

Cerilli was re-elected in the 1995 provincial election, defeating Liberal challenger Art Miki by 4,891 votes to 2,401. The Progressive Conservatives won the general election again; during her time in opposition, Cerilli served as NDP critic for Housing, Workplace Safety, Health and Youth. She was regarded as one of the more left-wing members of caucus, and was the only Manitoba MLA to support Svend Robinson, rather than Lorne Nystrom, for the leadership of the federal NDP in 1995.

The NDP were victorious in the 1999 provincial election, and Cerilli personally defeated Progressive Conservative Henry McDonald by 5,198 votes to 3,114. She was not appointed to cabinet, but served as legislative assistant to the Minister of Family Services and Housing. In 2003, she supported Bill Blaikie's campaign to lead the federal New Democratic Party.

Prior to the 2003 provincial election, she decided to leave her Radisson riding to run for the nomination in Wolseley. She lost the nomination to Rob Altemeyer, who served as an MLA until he retired in 2019. She now teaches part-time at the University of Winnipeg, and is operating a community development business.

On September 15, 2006, Cerilli officially registered as a candidate for Mayor of the City of Winnipeg in the 2006 municipal election, but came second to incumbent mayor Sam Katz.

== Electoral record ==
=== Provincial ===
1999 Manitoba general election: Radisson
Party	Candidate	Votes	%	±%	Expenditures
New Democratic	Marianne Cerilli	5,198	55.02	2.98	$17,431.00
Progressive Conservative	Henry A. McDonald	3,114	32.96	10.54	$21,837.83
Liberal	Betty Ann Watts	1,136	12.02	-13.52	$15,219.75
Total valid votes		9,448	–	–	
Rejected		38	–		
Eligible voters / turnout		13,344	71.09	4.47	
New Democratic hold		Swing		-3.78	
Source(s) Source: Manitoba. Chief Electoral Officer (1999). Statement of Votes for the 37th Provincial General Election, September 21, 1999 (PDF) (Report). Winnipeg: Elections Manitoba.

1995 Manitoba general election: Radisson
Party	Candidate	Votes	%	±%
New Democratic	Marianne Cerilli	4,891	52.04	5.28
Liberal	Art Miki	2,401	25.55	3.35
Progressive Conservative	Jennifer Clark	2,107	22.42	-8.63
Total valid votes		9,399	–	–
Rejected		49	–	
Eligible voters / turnout		14,183	66.61	-1.26
New Democratic hold		Swing		+0.96
Source(s) Source: Manitoba. Chief Electoral Officer (1999). Statement of Votes for the 37th Provincial General Election, September 21, 1999 (PDF) (Report). Winnipeg: Elections Manitoba.

1990 Manitoba general election: Radisson
Party	Candidate	Votes	%	±%
New Democratic	Marianne Cerilli	4,055	46.76	18.66
Progressive Conservative	Mike Thompson	2,692	31.04	3.52
Liberal	Allan Patterson	1,925	22.20	-22.19
Total valid votes		8,672	–	–
Rejected		26	–	
Eligible voters / turnout		12,814	67.88	-9.61
New Democratic gain from Liberal		Swing		+20.42
Source(s) Source: Manitoba. Chief Electoral Officer (1999). Statement of Votes for the 37th Provincial General Election, September 21, 1999 (PDF) (Report). Winnipeg: Elections Manitoba.

=== Municipal ===
2006 Winnipeg municipal election: Mayor of Winnipeg
Candidate	Votes	%
(x)Sam Katz	104,380	61.60
Marianne Cerilli	38,227	22.56
Kaj Hasselriis	22,401	13.22
Ron Pollock	4,444	2.62
Total valid votes	169,452	100.00
