= Jack Reimer =

Canadian politician

Jack F. Reimer

Minister of Urban Affairs
- In office May 9, 1995 – October 5, 1999
- Premier: Gary Filmon
- Preceded by: Linda McIntosh
- Succeeded by: transferred to Minister of Intergovernmental Affairs

Minister of Housing
- In office May 9, 1995 – October 5, 1999
- Premier: Gary Filmon
- Succeeded by: transferred to Minister of Family Services and Housing

Member of the Legislative Assembly of Manitoba for Southdale Niakwa, 1990–1999
- In office September 11, 1990 – May 22, 2007
- Preceded by: Herold Driedger
- Succeeded by: Erin Selby

Personal details
- Born: East Kildonan, Winnipeg
- Party: Progressive Conservative
- Spouse: Joan McAdam
- Education: University of North Dakota

Jack F. Reimer is a Progressive Conservative politician in Manitoba, Canada. He was a member of the Legislative Assembly of Manitoba (MLA) from 1990 to 2007, and served in the government of Gary Filmon.

The son of Jacob Frank Reimer, a Russian immigrant, he grew up in East Kildonan where his father owned a service station and he graduated from Miles MacDonell Collegiate. Reimer has a degree in sociology from the University of North Dakota. Before entering politics, he was a marketing and management instructor for Imperial Oil, and worked in the automobile and tourism industries in Manitoba. He also owned a restaurant and service station. Reimer has received a Mayor's Award for Leadership and Service to the Winnipeg community, as well as a Certificate of Merit from the government of Canada.

He married Joan McAdam.

Reimer was first elected to the Manitoba legislature in the 1990 general election, defeating Liberal candidate Linda Asper in the southeastern Winnipeg riding of Niakwa, 4950 votes to 4301. He was re-elected by a wider margin in 1995, in a period when provincial Liberal fortunes were on the decline (the New Democratic Party (NDP) does not have a strong historical presence in this section of Winnipeg).

On May 9, 1995, Reimer was appointed Minister of Urban Affairs and Minister of Housing in Gary Filmon's government. He retained these portfolios until the Progressive Conservative government was defeated in 1999. Reimer himself was easily re-elected in the 1999 election, defeating his NDP opponent by over 2500 votes in the renamed Southdale riding.

In the 2003 election, Reimer was re-elected by 1299 votes over his 26-year-old NDP opponent, Carolyn Frost. He held several critic positions while an opposition MLA.

Reimer opposed efforts by the Manitoba government to provide safe injection paraphernalia to drug addicts, arguing instead for a zero-tolerance policy in such matters. He also criticized the expansion of a casino economy in the province.

He lost his seat to his NDP challenger, former journalist Erin Selby, in the 2007 provincial election.

Preceded by Herold Driedger	Member of the Manitoba Legislative Assembly for Niakwa; 1990–1999	Succeeded by This riding was abolished in 1999.
Preceded by This riding was created 1999	Member of the Manitoba Legislative Assembly for Southdale; 1999–2007	Succeeded by Erin Selby
