= Linda West =

Canadian politician

- Education: Laurentian University; University of Toronto; Washington International University
- Occupations: Administrator, activist, politician, philanthropist
- Employer: Retired
- Known for: Conservative Party of Canada; Progressive Conservative Party of Manitoba
- Political party: Conservative
- Movement: Healthcare reform

Linda West is a Canadian administrator, activist and politician. She has been a candidate for the Conservative Party of Canada and the Progressive Conservative Party of Manitoba. She is also known for her involvements in several volunteering organizations like Rotary Club of Parry sound, Habitat for Humanity, Community Business and Development Centre, The Parry Sound Area Founders Circle etc. She received the Order of Parry Sound in 2020 for community services and supports during the COVID-19 pandemic. As on 2021, she is known for serving as the president of Rotary Club of Parry Sound and for winning Rotary’s most prestigious award, Service Above Self.

== Education ==
West has a Bachelor of Arts degree from Laurentian University and a Master of Business Administration specializing in Health Care from the University of Toronto. She also holds a Ph.D. from Washington International University, an unaccredited institution incorporated in the British Virgin Islands.

== Career ==
West was executive director of the James Bay General Hospital from 1992 to 1995, and of the Winnipeg River Health District from 1995 to 1997. From 1997 to 2000, she was executive director of labour relations for Manitoba Health. She has also been a health policy consultant for the Progressive Conservative Party of Manitoba, and has taught nursing and business at the University of Manitoba.

In 2003, West helped organize a conference in Winnipeg, Manitoba on the role of women in politics. She received a Women of Distinction Award from the Winnipeg YMCA-YWCA in 2004, and was later chosen as the local director of Equal Voice, a group that promotes the increased participation of women in political life. West authored the Trends and Issues in Health Care. In 2006, she helped organize a rebuilding effort in New Orleans for Habitat For Humanity.

In July 2007, West was hired as executive director for employment services in the Regina Qu’Appelle Health Region's Human Resources Department. She was named acting vice-president of Human Resources in August of the same year, and became vice-president in December. West left employment with the Regina Qu’Appelle Health Region on 21 February 2008. West also became vice-president of Human Resources with a recruitment agency that provides Canadian placements to migrant workers from the Philippines, in 2007. She argued in 2008 that Canada needs overseas recruitment to counter a domestic labour shortage. West co-founded Actyl Group, a human resource recruitment agency. She serves as the company president.

West returned to the University of Manitoba in 2015 to teach in the Asper School of Business. She retired in 2019 to work voluntarily with several charities.

== Activist and political candidate ==
West first ran for public office in the 2003 provincial election, as a candidate of the Progressive Conservative Party. She initially sought the party's nomination for Riel, but lost to former Member of the Legislative Assembly Shirley Render at a nomination meeting in late 2002. During the nomination contest, one PC insider suggested that West's views on private health care would be a liability for the party.

West subsequently convened a public meeting on Manitoba's physician shortage, which was held at Winnipeg's Transcona Inn in early 2003. During the question and answer session, she announced that she was considering a candidacy in the division of Radission. The political overtones of this meeting were noted in a newspaper report, though West denied that it had been called for political purposes. She won the Radisson nomination, but lost to New Democratic Party candidate Bidhu Jha in the general election.

The Manitoba Nurses' Union criticized West in late 2003, after she led a group of her own fourth-year undergraduate students in a rally outside the provincial legislature supporting an on-the-job training program. It was alleged that the students received a portion of their grade for participating in the rally, but West said that her students were taught to review both sides of the issue.

West was a supporter of the Progressive Conservative Party of Canada at the federal level, and supported its merger with the more right-wing Canadian Alliance to create the Conservative Party of Canada in 2003. She ran for the new party in the 2006 federal election, and finished second against New Democratic Party incumbent Bill Blaikie in Elmwood—Transcona. West's Ph.D. credentials became a source of controversy during the 2006 federal election because Washington International University is an institution that is licensed but not accredited by any educational oversight body in Canada or the United States of America.

West challenged Bidhu Jha a second time in the 2007 provincial election, initially centering her campaign around local opposition to a hog-processing plant planned for construction in the Radisson area. The NDP government withdrew its support for the project during the election, and indicated that the plant would not be built. Some NDP insiders nevertheless expressed concern that their early support for the unpopular project had made the seat vulnerable. On election day, however, Jha defeated West by an increased margin.

West received the Order of Parry Sound for the year 2020 owing to her community services and support during the COVID-19 pandemic specifically for the Rotary Club grocery program that offered convenient grocery shopping during the difficult situation.

=== Health care ===
West has written several articles calling for Manitoba and Canada to develop new strategic plans for health care delivery. She supports the Canada Health Act.

West and provincial Health Minister Dave Chomiak engaged in a public controversy over health care strategies in late 2001 and early 2002. In the same period, West argued that Manitobans should pay health-care premiums instead of paying for health expenses through general taxation.

West returned to writing opinion pieces on Canada's health-care system after the 2003 election. She reiterated her support for publicly funded private clinics, and criticized the provincial government's approach to the issue. She was also a vocal opponent of Winnipeg Mayor Glen Murray's tax policies, which she spoke against at several public meetings.

== Philanthropy ==
West has been awarded Rotary International's Service Above Self Award 2022-23 for helping a large number of Ukrainians resettle in Parry Sound and for establishing a Ukrainian Rotaract Club. She provided the leadership so that the community was able to assist with accommodation, community integration, and paperwork, and advocated for their refugee status. Parry Sound and area has fully embraced the Ukrainians as demonstrated by the recent sold out event - Discover Ukraine.

She was also appointed to the funding committee of the West Parry Sound Recreation and Cultural Centre in March 2022 which is establishing a six lane pool and needs to raise $10 million.

== Electoral record ==
2007 Manitoba general election: Radisson
Party	Candidate	Votes	%	±%	Expenditures
New Democratic	Bidhu Jha	4,804	56.72	4.28	$38,067.77
Progressive Conservative	Linda West	2,988	35.28	-3.85	$31,483.45
Liberal	Murray James Cliff	677	7.99	-0.42	$0.00
Total valid votes		8,469	–	–	
Rejected		57	–		
Eligible voters / turnout		14,154	60.24	6.19	
New Democratic hold		Swing		+4.06	
Source(s) Source: Manitoba. Chief Electoral Officer (2007). Statement of Votes for the 39th Provincial General Election, May 22, 2007 (PDF) (Report). Winnipeg: Elections Manitoba.

2006 Canadian federal election: Elmwood—Transcona
Party	Candidate	Votes	%	±%	Expenditures
New Democratic	Bill Blaikie	16,967	50.85	−1.14	$40,314.57
Conservative	Linda West	10,720	32.13	+6.02	$68,007.66
Liberal	Tanya Parks	4,108	12.31	−4.50	$12,622.61
Green	Tanja Hutter	1,211	3.63	+1.17	$240.77
Christian Heritage	Robert Scott	363	1.09	−0.23	$706.54
Total valid votes		33,369	99.60		
Total rejected ballots		133	0.40	+0.12	
Turnout		33,502	58.20	+7.55	
Electors on the lists		57,561			
New Democratic hold		Swing		−3.58	
Sources: Official Results, Elections Canada and Financial Returns, Elections Canada.

2003 Manitoba general election: Radisson
Party	Candidate	Votes	%	±%	Expenditures
New Democratic	Bidhu Jha	3,888	52.45	-2.57	$26,913.04
Progressive Conservative	Linda West	2,901	39.13	6.17	$17,661.88
Liberal	Murray Cliff	624	8.42	-3.61	$2,277.16
Total valid votes		7,413	–	–	
Rejected		37	–		
Eligible voters / turnout		13,783	54.05	-17.04	
New Democratic hold		Swing		-4.37	
Source(s) Source: Manitoba. Chief Electoral Officer (2003). Statement of Votes for the 38th Provincial General Election, June 3, 2003 (PDF) (Report). Winnipeg: Elections Manitoba.

All electoral information is taken from Elections Canada and Elections Manitoba. Provincial expenditures refer to candidate expenses. Italicized expenditures refer to submitted totals, and are presented when the final reviewed totals are not available.
