= Gérard Lécuyer =

Canadian politician (1936–2025)

Minister of Environment and Workplace and Health

Member of the Legislative Assembly of Manitoba for Radisson
- In office November 17, 1981 – April 26, 1988
- Preceded by: Abe Kovnats
- Succeeded by: Allan Patterson

Personal details
- Born: August 2, 1936 St. Boniface, Manitoba, Canada
- Died: July 9, 2025 (aged 88) Winnipeg, Manitoba, Canada
- Party: New Democratic
- Education: University of Manitoba

Gérard Lécuyer (August 2, 1936 – July 9, 2025) was a Canadian politician in Manitoba. He was a member of the Legislative Assembly of Manitoba from 1981 to 1988, and a cabinet minister in the New Democratic Party government of Howard Pawley from 1983 to 1988.

== Life and career ==
The son of Albert Lécuyer and Suzanne Delaloye, he was born in Saint Boniface in 1936 grew up in Ste. Agathe and was educated at St. Boniface College and the University of Manitoba, working as an educator-administrator before entering public life. He directed special projects in the Bureau de l'Éducation française for the Department of Education, and was a teacher in the St. Boniface school division. He also spent five years in Africa as a teacher with the Canadian International Development Agency (CIDA), and was a member of the Franco-Manitoban Society.

He was first elected to the Manitoba legislature in the election of 1981, scoring a comfortable victory in the east-Winnipeg riding of Radisson. The NDP won a majority government in this election, and Lecuyer was named Government House Leader soon after the party's victory. He was a leading supporter of the legal re-entrenchment of French language services within the province.

Lecuyer was named Minister of Environment and Workplace Safety and Health on November 4, 1983. He won a fairly easy re-election in the 1986 election, and retained his cabinet positions until the NDP government was unexpectedly defeated in the legislature in 1988. He lost his seat to Liberal Allan Patterson by almost 2,000 votes in the 1988 provincial election.

After leaving politics, Lecuyer worked as a consultant in Manitoba and the Yukon. From 1990 to 1994, he was executive director of the Francophone Parents Federation in Manitoba. He was also appointed to the Manitoba Clean Environment Commission. He died in Winnipeg on July 9, 2025, at the age of 88.
