= Jelynn Dela Cruz =

Canadian politician

Jelynn Dela Cruz MLA

Member of the Legislative Assembly of Manitoba for Radisson
- Incumbent
- Assumed office October 3, 2023
- Preceded by: James Teitsma

Legislative Assistant to the Minister of Health, Seniors and Long-Term Care
- Incumbent
- Assumed office October 19, 2023
- Minister: Uzoma Asagwara

96th President of the University of Manitoba Students' Union
- In office 2020–2021
- Preceded by: Jakob Sanderson
- Succeeded by: Brendan Scott

Personal details
- Born: Jelynn Angelique Dela Cruz; December 30, 1999 (age 26) Winnipeg, Manitoba, Canada
- Party: New Democratic
- Education: University of Manitoba (BA)

Jelynn Angelique Dela Cruz (born December 30, 1999) is a Canadian politician, who was elected to the Legislative Assembly of Manitoba in the 2023 Manitoba general election by defeating incumbent Progressive Conservative cabinet minister James Teitsma. She represents the district of Radisson as a member of the Manitoba New Democratic Party. She serves as Legislative Assistant to the Minister of Health. At the age of 23, her 2023 election win made her the youngest woman ever elected to the Legislative Assembly of Manitoba.

Prior to being elected, she worked in administration and fund development at L'Arche Winnipeg. While attending the University of Manitoba, she served as the President of the University of Manitoba Students' Union. She speaks English, French and Tagalog. She has come out as bisexual.

== Personal life ==
Dela Cruz attended Miles Macdonell Collegiate, where she was enrolled in the International Baccaleurate program. Thereafter, she enrolled at the University of Manitoba, majoring in Sociology.

== Electoral history ==
2023 Manitoba general election: Radisson
| Party | Candidate | Votes | % | ±% | Expenditures |
|---|---|---|---|---|---|
| New Democratic | Jelynn Dela Cruz | 5,954 | 52.31 | +15.61 | $28,441.14 |
| Progressive Conservative | James Teitsma | 4,807 | 42.23 | -4.73 | $49,117.12 |
| Liberal | Jean Luc Bouché | 621 | 5.46 | -4.94 | $1,946.42 |
| Total valid votes/expense limit | | 11,382 | 99.53 | -0.01 | $77,750.00 |
| Total rejected and declined ballots | | 54 | 0.47 | +0.01 | |
| Turnout | | 11,436 | 57.65 | +1.18 | |
| Eligible voters | | 19,838 | | | |
| New Democratic gain from Progressive Conservative | | Swing | | +10.17 | |
Source(s) Source: Elections Manitoba
