= Blair Yakimoski =

Canadian politician

Member of the Legislative Assembly of Manitoba for Transcona
- In office April 19, 2016 – August 12, 2019
- Preceded by: Daryl Reid
- Succeeded by: Nello Altomare

Personal details
- Party: Progressive Conservative

Blair Yakimoski is a Canadian provincial politician, who was elected as the Member of the Legislative Assembly of Manitoba for the riding of Transcona in the 2016 election. He is a member of the Progressive Conservative Party of Manitoba. Yakimoski is of Ukrainian descent.

After serving as a backbench MLA for the 41st Manitoba Legislature, he lost his seat to Nello Altomare of the New Democratic Party of Manitoba in the 2019 Manitoba general election.

== Electoral results ==
2019 Manitoba general election: Transcona
Party	Candidate	Votes	%	±%	Expenditures
New Democratic	Nello Altomare	4,030	46.42	+18.2	$15,870.22
Progressive Conservative	Blair Yakimoski	3,918	45.13	-4.7	$28,026.59
Liberal	Dylan Bekkering	734	8.45	-10.1	$0.00
Total valid votes		8,682	99.12		
Total rejected ballots		47	0.88		
Turnout		8,759	52.45		
Eligible voters		16,701			
New Democratic gain from Progressive Conservative		Swing		+11.4	
Source(s) Source: Elections Manitoba and CBC News

2016 Manitoba general election: Transcona
Party	Candidate	Votes	%	±%	Expenditures
Progressive Conservative	Blair Yakimoski	3,948	49.38	+14.76	$33,019.24
New Democratic	Barb Burkowski	2,281	28.53	-29.70	$42,927.60
Liberal	Chad Panting	1,465	18.32	+11.17	$15,578.42
Manitoba	Ajit Kumar	233	2.91		$5,194.78
Communist	Darrell Rankin	68	0.85		$33.60
Total valid votes/expense limit		7,995	97.97	$	
Total rejected ballots		166	2.03	+1.50	
Turnout		8,161	55.98	+4.74	
Eligible voters		14,578			
Source: Elections Manitoba
Progressive Conservative gain from New Democratic		Swing		+22,23	
