= 2025 Transcona provincial by-election =

Provincial by-election in Manitoba, Canada

- March 18, 2025

Riding of Transcona
- Turnout: 31.44% (▼19.96pp)
	First party	Second party
	NDP	PC
Candidate	Shannon Corbett	Shawn Nason
Party	New Democratic	Progressive Conservative
Popular vote	3,616	1,569
Percentage	64.46%	27.97%
Swing	▲5.95	▼7.48
MLA before election
Nello Altomare
New Democratic
Elected MLA
Shannon Corbett
New Democratic

The 2025 Transcona provincial by-election was held on March 18, 2025. It was triggered by the death of NDP member of the Legislative Assembly of Manitoba Nello Altomare.

== Candidates ==
Four candidates stood in the by-election:

- Shannon Corbett (NDP)
- Shawn Nason (PC)
- Brad Boudreau (Liberal)
- Susan Auch (Independent)

== Results ==
Manitoba provincial by-election, March 18, 2025: Transcona Death of Nello Altomare
Party	Candidate	Votes	%	±%	Expenditures
New Democratic	Shannon Corbett	3,616	64.46	+5.95	
Progressive Conservative	Shawn Nason	1,569	27.97	-7.48	
Liberal	Brad Boudreau	217	3.87	-2.18	
Independent	Susan Auch	208	3.71	–	
Total valid votes		5,610	99.63	–	
Total rejected and declined ballots		21	0.37	-0.14	
Turnout		5,631	31.44	-19.96	
Eligible voters		17,910			
New Democratic hold		Swing		+6.72	
