= James Teitsma =

Canadian provincial politician

Minister of Consumer Protection and Government Services
- In office January 30, 2022 – October 18, 2023
- Premier: Heather Stefanson
- Preceded by: Reg Helwer
- Succeeded by: Lisa Naylor

Minister Responsible for the Public Service Commission
- In office January 30, 2023 – October 18, 2023
- Premier: Heather Stefanson
- Preceded by: Reg Helwer
- Succeeded by: Adrien Sala

Member of the Legislative Assembly of Manitoba for Radisson
- In office April 19, 2016 – September 5, 2023
- Preceded by: Bidhu Jha
- Succeeded by: Jelynn Dela Cruz

Personal details
- Born: James Peter Teitsma; April 14, 1971 (age 55) Winnipeg, Manitoba, Canada
- Party: Progressive Conservative
- Education: University of Manitoba
- Website: jamesteitsma.ca

James Peter Teitsma MLA is a Canadian provincial politician, who was elected as the Member of the Legislative Assembly of Manitoba for the riding of Radisson in the 2016 election. He is a member of the Progressive Conservative Party of Manitoba, and defeated New Democratic Party (NDP) challenger Preet Singh.

He was re-elected in the 2019 provincial election.

In February 2020, Teitsma faced backlash for posting opposition to a proposed program to provide breakfast to all schoolchildren in Manitoba schools, stating that it would be better for families if children could eat meals at home.

In January 2021, James Teitsma faced public criticism for his disregard of Manitoba provincial COVID-19 guidelines which directed that people “avoid all non-essential travel”, and took his family on a 10-day driving trip through Western Canada during the December 2020 holiday season. He did not face any consequences for his decision.

In the 2023 election, the NDP defeated the PCs at the provincewide level to form government, and Teitsma lost his seat to NDP candidate Jelynn Dela Cruz by 1,147 votes.

== Electoral record ==
2023 Manitoba general election: Radisson
Party	Candidate	Votes	%	±%	Expenditures
New Democratic	Jelynn Dela Cruz	5,954	52.31	+15.61	$28,441.14
Progressive Conservative	James Teitsma	4,807	42.23	-4.73	$49,117.12
Liberal	Jean Luc Bouché	621	5.46	-4.94	$1,946.42
Total valid votes/expense limit		11,382	99.53	-0.01	$77,750.00
Total rejected and declined ballots		54	0.47	+0.01	
Turnout		11,436	57.65	+1.18	
Eligible voters		19,838			
New Democratic gain from Progressive Conservative		Swing		+10.17	
Source(s) Source: Elections Manitoba

2019 Manitoba general election: Radisson
Party	Candidate	Votes	%	±%	Expenditures
Progressive Conservative	James Teitsma	4,527	46.97	-6.8	$34,015.35
New Democratic	Raj Sandhu	3,538	36.71	+5.0	$17,769.68
Liberal	Tanya Hansen Pratt	1,002	10.40	-2.2	$502.30
Green	Carlianne Runions	572	5.93	–	$0.00
Total valid votes		9,639	99.54	–	
Rejected		45	0.46		
Turnout		9,684	56.47		
Eligible voters		17,150			
Progressive Conservative hold		Swing		-5.9	
Source(s) Source: Manitoba. Chief Electoral Officer (2019). Statement of Votes for the 42nd Provincial General Election, September 10, 2019 (PDF) (Report). Winnipeg: Elections Manitoba. "Candidate Election Returns". Elections Manitoba. Elections Manitoba.

2016 Manitoba general election: Radisson
Party	Candidate	Votes	%	±%	Expenditures
Progressive Conservative	James Teitsma	4,635	50.53	11.22	$35,751.70
New Democratic	Preet Singh	2,945	32.11	-23.04	$45,802.95
Liberal	Scott Newman	1,593	17.37	11.82	$21,101.45
Total valid votes		9,173	–	–	
Rejected		225	–		
Eligible voters / turnout		14,956	62.84	1.36	
Progressive Conservative gain from New Democratic		Swing		+16.95	
Source(s) Source: Manitoba. Chief Electoral Officer (2016). Statement of Votes for the 41st Provincial General Election, April 19, 2016 (PDF) (Report). Winnipeg: Elections Manitoba. "Election Returns: 41st General Election". Elections Manitoba. 2016.
