= Niakwa =

Defunct provincial electoral district in Manitoba, Canada

Niakwa is a former provincial electoral district of Manitoba, Canada. It was created in 1979 and abolished in 1999.

The Niakwa riding was located in southeastern Winnipeg. After its abolition, almost all of the riding's territory was given to the new riding of Southdale.

== Members of the Legislative Assembly ==
Manitoba MLAs for the electoral district of Niakwa
Term of office	Name	Political party
1981-1988	Abe Kovnats	Progressive Conservative
1988-1990	Herold Driedger	Liberal
1990-1999	Jack Reimer	Progressive Conservative

== Election results ==
1988 Manitoba general election
Party	Candidate	Votes	%	±%
Liberal	Herold Driedger	8,576	47.48	+
Progressive Conservative	Abe Kovnats	7,222	39.99	-
New Democratic	Stan Williams	2,026	11.22	-
Western Independence	Lyle Cruickshank	237	1.31	
Total valid votes		18,061	100.00	-
Rejected ballots		21	–	–
Turnout		18,082	79.64	
Eligible voters		22,705		
Source: Elections Manitoba

== See also ==
- List of Manitoba provincial electoral districts
- Canadian provincial electoral districts
