= Nello Altomare =

Canadian politician (1963–2025)

The Honourable Nello Altomare MLA

Minister of Education and Early Childhood Learning
- In office October 18, 2023 – January 14, 2025; On leave of absence: October 8, 2024–January 14, 2025 (Note: Environment and Climate Change Minister Tracy Schmidt served as acting minister of Education during the Leave of Absence)
- Premier: Wab Kinew
- Preceded by: Wayne Ewasko
- Succeeded by: Tracy Schmidt

Member of the Legislative Assembly of Manitoba for Transcona
- In office September 10, 2019 – January 14, 2025
- Preceded by: Blair Yakimoski
- Succeeded by: Shannon Corbett

Personal details
- Born: December 19, 1963 Transcona, Manitoba
- Died: January 14, 2025 (aged 61) Winnipeg, Manitoba, Canada
- Party: New Democratic
- Spouse: Barb (m. 1997)
- Children: 2
- Education: University of Winnipeg (B.Ed.) (B.A.); University of Manitoba
- Occupation: Teacher, school administrator, politician

Nello Altomare (December 19, 1963 – January 14, 2025) was a Canadian politician who was elected to the Legislative Assembly of Manitoba in the 2019 Manitoba general election. He represented the electoral district of Transcona as a member of the New Democratic Party of Manitoba until his death in 2025.

== Early life and career ==
Altomare was born to Italian immigrant parents in Transcona in 1963, before the amalgamation of Winnipeg took effect in 1972. He attended Transcona Collegiate Institute, earned bachelor's degrees in education and arts from the University of Winnipeg, and completed post-graduate studies at the University of Manitoba.

Altomare was certified as a teacher in 1986, and became a school administrator in the Transcona-Springfield and later River East Transcona School Divisions, based in northeast Winnipeg.

== Political career ==
In the 2019 election, Altomare defeated Progressive Conservative (PC) incumbent Blair Yakimoski to become the Member of the Legislative Assembly for the district of Transcona. In the 42nd Manitoba Legislature, Altomare served as the NDP's critic for education and early childhood learning. He was appointed to serve as minister for the same portfolio after the NDP replaced the PCs as the governing party in the 2023 Manitoba general election. As Minister, he oversaw the creation of a searchable online database of Manitoban teachers as part of an effort to increase transparency around misconduct in education. He also oversaw the passing of legislation to create a permanent universal school food program, which Premier Wab Kinew said would be named "Nello's Law". Other reforms included bans on cellphones in elementary school and stricter rules on requiring devices to be silenced during high school classes.

Altomare was diagnosed with stage II Hodgkin’s lymphoma shortly after he was first elected as an MLA in 2019. Going on medical leave on October 8, 2024, he died 14 weeks later, on January 14, 2025, due to complications from chemotherapy. He was 61 years old. The Manitoba Legislative Building's flags were lowered to half-mast after his death. The by-election to replace him was held on March 18, 2025.

== Personal life ==
Altomare married his wife, Barb, in 1997 and was survived by two adult children.

== Electoral results ==
2023 Manitoba general election: Transcona
Party	Candidate	Votes	%	±%	Expenditures
New Democratic	Nello Altomare	5,235	58.50	+12.09	$23,820.41
Progressive Conservative	Titi Tijani	3,172	35.45	-9.68	$33,125.35
Liberal	Arthur Bloomfield	541	6.05	-2.41	$0.00
Total valid votes/expense limit		8,948	99.49	–	$68,202.00
Total rejected and declined ballots		46	0.51	–0.37	
Turnout		8,994	51.40	-1.05	
Eligible voters		17,498			
New Democratic hold		Swing		+10.88	
Source(s) Source: Elections Manitoba

2019 Manitoba general election: Transcona
Party	Candidate	Votes	%	±%	Expenditures
New Democratic	Nello Altomare	4,030	46.42	+18.2	$15,870.22
Progressive Conservative	Blair Yakimoski	3,918	45.13	-4.7	$28,026.59
Liberal	Dylan Bekkering	734	8.45	-10.1	$0.00
Total valid votes		8,682	99.12		
Total rejected ballots		47	0.88		
Turnout		8,759	52.45		
Eligible voters		16,701			
New Democratic gain from Progressive Conservative		Swing		+11.4	
Source(s) Source: Elections Manitoba and CBC News
