= Radisson (electoral district) =

Provincial electoral district in Manitoba, Canada

Coordinates: 49.884°N 97.044°W

Manitoba electoral district
- Location in Winnipeg

Provincial electoral district
- Legislature: Legislative Assembly of Manitoba
MLA
Jelynn Dela Cruz
New Democratic
- District created: 1957
- First contested: 1958
- Last contested: 2023

Demographics
- Population (2016): 21,640
- Electors (2019): 17,150
- Area (km²): 15
- Pop. density (per km²): 1,442.7

Radisson is a provincial electoral district of Manitoba, Canada. It was created by redistribution in 1957, and has formally existed since the 1958 provincial election. The riding is located in the northeastern section of the city of Winnipeg and is named after Pierre-Esprit Radisson, a seventeenth-century explorer.

Radisson is bordered on the east by Transcona and Springfield, to the south by Southdale, to the north by River East, and to the west by Rossmere, Concordia and St. Boniface. The Canadian National Railway Symington Yards are in the southern part of the riding.

The riding's population in 1996 was 20,113. In 1999, the average family income was $54084, and the unemployment rate was 4.60%. Radisson's francophone population is 9%, and there are also significant Ukrainian (7%) and German (6%) communities.

Manufacturing accounts for 14% of Radisson's industry, with a further 13% in the retail trade.

New Democratic Party MLA and former party leader Russell Paulley represented the riding for many years, although the boundaries changed dramatically with the 1998 redistribution. The Progressive Conservatives won the riding in 1977, and the Liberals did the same in 1988. In both cases, the NDP regained the seat after a single term.

== Members of the Legislative Assembly ==
This riding has elected the following MLAs:

Assembly	Years	Member	Party
Riding created from St. Boniface and Kildonan-Transcona
22nd	1958–1959	Russell Paulley	CCF
23rd	1959–1961	Russell Paulley	CCF
23rd	1961–1962	Russell Paulley	New Democratic Party
24th	1962–1966	Russell Paulley	New Democratic Party
25th	1966–1969	Russell Paulley	New Democratic Party
26th	1969–1973	Harry Shafransky	New Democratic Party
27th	1973–1977	Harry Shafransky	New Democratic Party
28th	1977–1981	Abe Kovnats	Progressive Conservative
29th	1981–1986	Gerard Lecuyer	New Democratic Party
30th	1986–1988	Gerard Lecuyer	New Democratic Party
31st	1988–1990	Allan Patterson	Liberal
32nd	1990–1993	Marianne Cerilli	New Democratic Party
33rd	1995–1999	Marianne Cerilli	New Democratic Party
34th	1999–2003	Marianne Cerilli	New Democratic Party
35th	2003–2007	Bidhu Jha	New Democratic Party
36th	2007–2011	Bidhu Jha	New Democratic Party
37th	2011–2016	Bidhu Jha	New Democratic Party
38th	2016–2019	James Teitsma	Progressive Conservative
39th	2019–2023	James Teitsma	Progressive Conservative
40th	2023–present	Jelynn Dela Cruz	New Democratic Party

== Election results ==
=== 2023 ===
2023 Manitoba general election
Party	Candidate	Votes	%	±%	Expenditures
New Democratic	Jelynn Dela Cruz	5,954	52.31	+15.61	$28,441.14
Progressive Conservative	James Teitsma	4,807	42.23	-4.73	$49,117.12
Liberal	Jean Luc Bouché	621	5.46	-4.94	$1,946.42
Total valid votes/expense limit		11,382	99.53	-0.01	$77,750.00
Total rejected and declined ballots		54	0.47	+0.01	
Turnout		11,436	57.65	+1.18	
Eligible voters		19,838			
New Democratic gain from Progressive Conservative		Swing		+10.17	
Source(s) Source: Elections Manitoba

=== 2019 ===
2019 Manitoba general election
Party	Candidate	Votes	%	±%	Expenditures
Progressive Conservative	James Teitsma	4,527	46.97	-6.8	$34,015.35
New Democratic	Raj Sandhu	3,538	36.71	+5.0	$17,769.68
Liberal	Tanya Hansen Pratt	1,002	10.40	-2.2	$502.30
Green	Carlianne Runions	572	5.93	–	$0.00
Total valid votes		9,639	99.54	–	
Rejected		45	0.46		
Turnout		9,684	56.47		
Eligible voters		17,150			
Progressive Conservative hold		Swing		-5.9	
Source(s) Source: Manitoba. Chief Electoral Officer (2019). Statement of Votes for the 42nd Provincial General Election, September 10, 2019 (PDF) (Report). Winnipeg: Elections Manitoba. "Candidate Election Returns". Elections Manitoba. Elections Manitoba.

=== 2016 ===
2016 provincial election redistributed results
Party	%
Progressive Conservative	53.8
New Democratic	31.7
Liberal	12.6
Others	1.9

2016 Manitoba general election
Party	Candidate	Votes	%	±%	Expenditures
Progressive Conservative	James Teitsma	4,635	50.53	11.22	$35,751.70
New Democratic	Preet Singh	2,945	32.11	-23.04	$45,802.95
Liberal	Scott Newman	1,593	17.37	11.82	$21,101.45
Total valid votes		9,173	–	–	
Rejected		225	–		
Eligible voters / turnout		14,956	62.84	1.36	
Progressive Conservative gain from New Democratic		Swing		+16.95	
Source(s) Source: Manitoba. Chief Electoral Officer (2016). Statement of Votes for the 41st Provincial General Election, April 19, 2016 (PDF) (Report). Winnipeg: Elections Manitoba. "Election Returns: 41st General Election". Elections Manitoba. 2016.

=== 2011 ===
2011 Manitoba general election
Party	Candidate	Votes	%	±%	Expenditures
New Democratic	Bidhu Jha	5,033	55.14	-1.58	$27,139.08
Progressive Conservative	Desmond Penner	3,588	39.31	4.03	$29,251.37
Liberal	Shirley Robert	506	5.54	-2.45	$1,414.15
Total valid votes		9,127	–	–	
Rejected		33	–		
Eligible voters / turnout		14,899	61.48	1.24	
New Democratic hold		Swing		-2.83	
Source(s) Source: Manitoba. Chief Electoral Officer (2011). Statement of Votes for the 40th Provincial General Election, October 4, 2011 (PDF) (Report). Winnipeg: Elections Manitoba. "Election Returns: 40th General Election". Elections Manitoba. 2011.

=== 2007 ===
2007 Manitoba general election
Party	Candidate	Votes	%	±%	Expenditures
New Democratic	Bidhu Jha	4,804	56.72	4.28	$38,067.77
Progressive Conservative	Linda West	2,988	35.28	-3.85	$31,483.45
Liberal	Murray James Cliff	677	7.99	-0.42	$0.00
Total valid votes		8,469	–	–	
Rejected		57	–		
Eligible voters / turnout		14,154	60.24	6.19	
New Democratic hold		Swing		+4.06	
Source(s) Source: Manitoba. Chief Electoral Officer (2007). Statement of Votes for the 39th Provincial General Election, May 22, 2007 (PDF) (Report). Winnipeg: Elections Manitoba.

=== 2003 ===
2003 Manitoba general election
Party	Candidate	Votes	%	±%	Expenditures
New Democratic	Bidhu Jha	3,888	52.45	-2.57	$26,913.04
Progressive Conservative	Linda West	2,901	39.13	6.17	$17,661.88
Liberal	Murray Cliff	624	8.42	-3.61	$2,277.16
Total valid votes		7,413	–	–	
Rejected		37	–		
Eligible voters / turnout		13,783	54.05	-17.04	
New Democratic hold		Swing		-4.37	
Source(s) Source: Manitoba. Chief Electoral Officer (2003). Statement of Votes for the 38th Provincial General Election, June 3, 2003 (PDF) (Report). Winnipeg: Elections Manitoba.

=== 1999 ===
1999 Manitoba general election
Party	Candidate	Votes	%	±%	Expenditures
New Democratic	Marianne Cerilli	5,198	55.02	2.98	$17,431.00
Progressive Conservative	Henry A. McDonald	3,114	32.96	10.54	$21,837.83
Liberal	Betty Ann Watts	1,136	12.02	-13.52	$15,219.75
Total valid votes		9,448	–	–	
Rejected		38	–		
Eligible voters / turnout		13,344	71.09	4.47	
New Democratic hold		Swing		-3.78	
Source(s) Source: Manitoba. Chief Electoral Officer (1999). Statement of Votes for the 37th Provincial General Election, September 21, 1999 (PDF) (Report). Winnipeg: Elections Manitoba.

=== 1995 ===
1995 Manitoba general election
Party	Candidate	Votes	%	±%
New Democratic	Marianne Cerilli	4,891	52.04	5.28
Liberal	Art Miki	2,401	25.55	3.35
Progressive Conservative	Jennifer Clark	2,107	22.42	-8.63
Total valid votes		9,399	–	–
Rejected		49	–	
Eligible voters / turnout		14,183	66.61	-1.26
New Democratic hold		Swing		+0.96
Source(s) Source: Manitoba. Chief Electoral Officer (1999). Statement of Votes for the 37th Provincial General Election, September 21, 1999 (PDF) (Report). Winnipeg: Elections Manitoba.

=== 1990 ===
1990 Manitoba general election
Party	Candidate	Votes	%	±%
New Democratic	Marianne Cerilli	4,055	46.76	18.66
Progressive Conservative	Mike Thompson	2,692	31.04	3.52
Liberal	Allan Patterson	1,925	22.20	-22.19
Total valid votes		8,672	–	–
Rejected		26	–	
Eligible voters / turnout		12,814	67.88	-9.61
New Democratic gain from Liberal		Swing		+20.42
Source(s) Source: Manitoba. Chief Electoral Officer (1999). Statement of Votes for the 37th Provincial General Election, September 21, 1999 (PDF) (Report). Winnipeg: Elections Manitoba.

=== 1988 ===
1988 Manitoba general election
Party	Candidate	Votes	%	±%
Liberal	Allan Patterson	4,918	44.39	30.55
New Democratic	Gerard Lecuyer	3,113	28.10	-25.62
Progressive Conservative	John Samborski	3,049	27.52	-2.25
Total valid votes		11,080	–	–
Rejected		36	–	
Eligible voters / turnout		14,346	77.49	7.94
Liberal gain from New Democratic		Swing		+28.08
Source(s) Source: Manitoba. Chief Electoral Officer (1999). Statement of Votes for the 37th Provincial General Election, September 21, 1999 (PDF) (Report). Winnipeg: Elections Manitoba.

=== 1986 ===
1986 Manitoba general election
Party	Candidate	Votes	%	±%
New Democratic	Gerard Lecuyer	4,810	53.71	-13.78
Progressive Conservative	Brian Benoit	2,666	29.77	1.42
Liberal	Allan Patterson	1,239	13.84	–
Progressive	Herold Driedger	240	2.68	-1.47
Total valid votes		8,955	–	–
Rejected		33	–	
Eligible voters / Turnout		12,924	69.55	-6.62
New Democratic hold		Swing		-7.60
Source(s) Source: Manitoba. Chief Electoral Officer (1999). Statement of Votes for the 37th Provincial General Election, September 21, 1999 (PDF) (Report). Winnipeg: Elections Manitoba.

=== 1981 ===
1981 Manitoba general election
Party	Candidate	Votes	%	±%
New Democratic	Gerard Lecuyer	6,108	67.49	+28.70
Progressive Conservative	George Provost	2,566	28.35	-18.47
Progressive	Joel Morassutti	376	4.15	New
Total valid votes		9,050	99.60	-0.28
Rejected		36	0.40	+0.28
Eligible voters / Turnout		11,929	76.17	-5.73
Source(s) Source: Manitoba. Chief Electoral Officer (1999). Statement of Votes for the 37th Provincial General Election, September 21, 1999 (PDF) (Report). Winnipeg: Elections Manitoba.

=== 1977 ===
1977 Manitoba general election
Party	Candidate	Votes	%	±%
Progressive Conservative	Abe Kovnats	4,535	46.82	+9.12
New Democratic	Harry Shafransky	3,757	38.79	-5.47
Liberal	Evelyne Reese	1,394	14.39	-3.65
Total valid votes		9,686	99.88	+0.25
Rejected		12	0.12	-0.25
Eligible voters / Turnout		11,841	81.90	+0.02
Source(s) Source: Manitoba. Chief Electoral Officer (1999). Statement of Votes for the 37th Provincial General Election, September 21, 1999 (PDF) (Report). Winnipeg: Elections Manitoba.

=== 1973 ===
1973 Manitoba general election
Party	Candidate	Votes	%	±%
New Democratic	Harry Shafransky	4,267	44.25	-8.36
Progressive Conservative	Abe Kovnats	3,635	37.70	+22.74
Liberal	D'Arcy Pagan	1,740	18.05	-14.37
Total valid votes		9,642	99.63	-0.27
Rejected		36	0.37	+0.27
Eligible voters / Turnout		11,820	81.88	+14.55
Source(s) Source: Manitoba. Chief Electoral Officer (1999). Statement of Votes for the 37th Provincial General Election, September 21, 1999 (PDF) (Report). Winnipeg: Elections Manitoba.

=== 1969 ===
1969 Manitoba general election
Party	Candidate	Votes	%	±%
New Democratic	Harry Shafransky	3,707	52.62	+3.35
Liberal	Ed Kotowich	2,284	32.42	-1.55
Progressive Conservative	Moreen Henderson	1,054	14.96	-1.80
Total valid votes		7,045	99.90	+0.32
Rejected		7	0.10	-0.32
Eligible voters / Turnout		10,474	67.33	+1.89
Source(s) Source: Manitoba. Chief Electoral Officer (1999). Statement of Votes for the 37th Provincial General Election, September 21, 1999 (PDF) (Report). Winnipeg: Elections Manitoba.

=== 1966 ===
1966 Manitoba general election
Party	Candidate	Votes	%	±%
New Democratic	Russell Paulley	7,114	49.27	+8.59
Liberal	Joseph-Philippe Guay	4,905	33.97	+2.00
Progressive Conservative	Nelson A. McLean	2,421	16.77	-10.59
Total valid votes		14,440	99.58	+0.06
Rejected		61	0.42	-0.04
Eligible voters / Turnout		22,159	65.44	+10.93
Source(s) Source: Manitoba. Chief Electoral Officer (1999). Statement of Votes for the 37th Provincial General Election, September 21, 1999 (PDF) (Report). Winnipeg: Elections Manitoba.

=== 1962 ===
1962 Manitoba general election
Party	Candidate	Votes	%	±%
New Democratic	Russell Paulley	4,032	40.67	-4.16
Liberal	Nick Slotek	3,169	31.97	-0.93
Progressive Conservative	Nelson A. McLean	2,712	27.36	-5.54
Total valid votes		9,913	99.52	+0.56
Rejected		48	0.48	-0.56
Eligible voters / Turnout		18,274	54.51	-11.83
Source(s) Source: Manitoba. Chief Electoral Officer (1999). Statement of Votes for the 37th Provincial General Election, September 21, 1999 (PDF) (Report). Winnipeg: Elections Manitoba.

=== 1959 ===
1959 Manitoba general election
Party	Candidate	Votes	%	±%
Co-operative Commonwealth	Russell Paulley	4,085	44.83	0.78
Progressive Conservative	Harold Huppe	2,998	32.90	6.30
Liberal–Progressive	Nick Slotek	2,029	22.27	-7.08
Total valid votes		9,112	98.96	-0.30
Rejected		96	1.04	+0.30
Eligible voters / Turnout		13,880	66.34	+4.21
Source(s) Source: Manitoba. Chief Electoral Officer (1999). Statement of Votes for the 37th Provincial General Election, September 21, 1999 (PDF) (Report). Winnipeg: Elections Manitoba.

=== 1958 ===
1958 Manitoba general election
Party	Candidate	Votes	%
Co-operative Commonwealth	Russell Paulley	3,504	44.05
Liberal–Progressive	Bernard Rodolph "Bernie" Wolfe	2,334	29.34
Progressive Conservative	Harold Huppe	2,116	26.60
Total valid votes		7,954	99.26
Rejected		59	0.74
Eligible voters / Turnout		12,897	62.13
Source(s) Source: Manitoba. Chief Electoral Officer (1999). Statement of Votes for the 37th Provincial General Election, September 21, 1999 (PDF) (Report). Winnipeg: Elections Manitoba.

== Previous boundaries ==
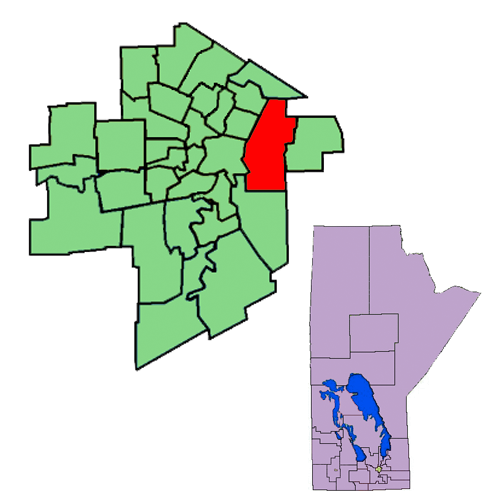
The 1999–2011 boundaries for Radisson highlighted in red.

== See also ==
- List of Manitoba provincial electoral districts
- Canadian provincial electoral districts
