= Minister of Environment (Manitoba) =

The Minister of Environment was a cabinet portfolio in Manitoba, Canada. In 1999, it was merged with the responsibilities of the Minister of Natural Resources to create a new Minister of Conservation portfolio.

From 1971 to 1979 responsibility for the environment was included in the remit of the Ministry of Mines, Resources and Environmental Management. It was then shifted to the Ministry of Consumer and Corporate Affairs and Environment from 1979 to 1981.

When Howard Pawley's government took office in late 1981, it established cabinet responsibilities directly related to the environment. The minister responsible was initially designated as the Minister responsible for Environmental Management, with the added responsibility of the administration of the Clean Environment Act, Workers Compensation Act, the Workplace Safety and Health Act, and the Communities Economic Development Fund Act. This was upgraded to a portfolio position in 1983, and the new minister was designated as the Minister of Environment, Workplace Safety and Health. A separate Ministry of Environment was created in 1989.

== List of ministers of environment ==
Name	Party	Took office	Left office	Title
Gary Filmon	Progressive Conservative	January 16, 1981	November 30, 1981	Minister of Environment
Jay Cowan	New Democratic Party	November 30, 1981	November 4, 1983	Minister responsible for Environmental Management Minister responsible for administration of Clean Environment Act
Gerald Lecuyer	New Democratic Party	November 4, 1983	May 9, 1988	Minister of Environment and Workplace and Health
Edward Connery	Progressive Conservative	May 9, 1988	April 21, 1989	Minister of Environment, Workplace Safety and Health
Glen Cummings	Progressive Conservative	April 21, 1989	January 6, 1997	Minister of Environment
James McCrae	Progressive Conservative	January 6, 1997	February 5, 1999	Minister of Environment
Linda McIntosh	Progressive Conservative	February 5, 1999	October 5, 1999	Minister of Environment
