= Art Miki =

Art Miki CM OM
- Born: Arthur Kazumi Miki; September 1, 1936 (age 90); British Columbia, Canada

Arthur Kazumi Miki CM OM (born 1936) is a Canadian activist and politician in Winnipeg, Manitoba. He was president of the National Association of Japanese Canadians from 1984 to 1992, and is best known for his work in seeking compensation for Japanese Canadians who were interned by the Government of Canada during World War II.

Miki's younger brother Roy was a Canadian poet and academic.

== Early life ==
Miki was born in British Columbia, and was among the 22,000 Japanese Canadians from that province who were displaced and interned during World War II. He and his family were forced to leave their six-hectare fruit farm near Vancouver, and were relocated to a one-room house in Ste. Agathe, Manitoba that they were forced to share with other families. He was educated in a French school, despite the fact that he did not speak the language.

Miki received a Bachelor of Education degree from the University of Manitoba in 1969, and a Master of Education degree in 1975. He received an honorary doctorate from the University of Winnipeg in 1999. He was a teacher for 29 years, and was for several years a high school and principal of Joseph Teres elementary school in the Transcona neighbourhood of Winnipeg. In 1991, he was appointed to the Order of Canada.

== Redress for Japanese Canadians ==
Miki became president of the National Association of Japanese Canadians in 1984, and announced that his organization would seek a formal apology from the Canadian government and full compensation for property that was confiscated in the 1940s. His announcement was seen as an important, as the NAJC had previously been divided on the issue of reparations.

Prime Minister Pierre Trudeau's government responded to Miki's request by expressing its regret for the wartime internment policy, but did not offer financial compensation. Trudeau argued that other ethnic groups, including the Acadians and Chinese Canadians, had also suffered historical discrimination, and said that the government could not begin to correct all past historical injustices.

Following the election of Brian Mulroney's Progressive Conservatives in 1984, Multiculturalism Minister Jack Murta announced that the government would offer a formal apology to Japanese Canadians. The Mulroney government also offered $6 million for a foundation dedicated to human rights projects, but did not offer individual compensation. Miki rejected the settlement figure as arbitrary, and called for a formally negotiated settlement.

Miki had a good working relationship with Murta despite their disagreements over policy, and described him as having a good understanding of the issues affecting minority groups. His relationship with Otto Jelinek, appointed as Murta's successor in 1985, was by contrast very poor. Jelinek argued that any apology to Japanese Canadians should be made as part of a larger apology to other ethnic groups who were victimized by past government decisions, and argued that an apology to a specific group would set a poor precedent. In 1986, Jelinek offered a compensation package of $10 million to be administered by the Japanese-Canadian community. Miki again rejected the offer, and called for a negotiated settlement.

In May 1986, Miki released a Price Waterhouse study which indicated that Japanese Canadians had lost $443 million in the 1940s due to discriminatory government policies. The release did not recommend a specific compensation figure, but was intended to provide a framework for further negotiations. Jelinek responded by saying that the report would have little effect on the government's plans.

David Crombie replaced Jelinek as Multiculturalism Minister in late June 1986. Miki welcomed the change, saying that Jelinek "[had] been dealing around us instead of dealing with us and the group that represents us", and adding "[f]or our particular issue, I'm not too sure he had much sympathy for it." Discussions over compensation soon became stalled again, notwithstanding the change. Crombie offered a $12 million community fund without individual compensation, which Miki rejected as inadequate. Miki's association requested $25,000 for each of the 14,000 survivors and a $50 million community fund, figures that Crombie rejected as beyond the government's means.

A breakthrough finally occurred shortly before the 1988 federal election, when Miki and Gerry Weiner (the Mulroney government's fourth Multiculturalism minister in as many years) concluded private negotiations for a comprehensive settlement. The government agreed to pay $21,000 for each survivor and $12 million for a community fund, and pledged to set up a Canadian Race Relations Foundation. Mulroney also delivered an apology for the wartime internment policy to the House of Commons of Canada. Miki described the settlement as marking "a great day for justice and human rights" and "a historic day for Canadians of Japanese ancestry who have been struggling so long to resolve the injustices of the 1940s".

The Canadian Race Relations Foundation was later established by the government of Jean Chrétien. Miki himself served as a director. Miki has also been a director of the Japanese Canadian Redress Foundation, and served as executive director of the Organization for Co-operation in Overseas Development.

In February 1998, he was appointed as a citizenship judge in Manitoba by Citizenship and Immigration Minister Lucienne Robillard.

In 2003, he lent his support to Avvy Go's efforts to seek an apology for past state discrimination against Chinese Canadians.

In 2012, he was made a member of the Order of Manitoba.

== Political candidate ==
Miki ran for the Liberal Party of Canada in the 1993 federal election, challenging New Democratic Party incumbent Bill Blaikie in the working-class riding of Winnipeg—Transcona. Regarded as a star candidate, he received an endorsement from the Brotherhood of Maintenance of Way Employees, a railway union with some influence in the area. On election day, he lost to Blaikie by 219 votes.

He later ran for the Manitoba Liberal Party in Radisson in the 1995 provincial election, but finished second to New Democratic Party incumbent Marianne Cerilli. A poor central campaign by the Liberals prevented him from mounting an effective challenge.
