= Allan Patterson =

Canadian politician

- Allan Patterson Circa 1988

Member of the Legislative Assembly of Manitoba for Radisson
- In office April 26, 1988 – September 11, 1990
- Preceded by: Gerard Lecuyer
- Succeeded by: Marianne Cerilli

Personal details
- Born: July 12, 1919 Ottawa, Ontario
- Died: July 23, 2009 (aged 90) Winnipeg, Manitoba
- Party: Liberal
- Education: Ontario Agricultural College; University of Western Ontario; University of Minnesota

Reginald Allan Patterson (July 12, 1919 in Ottawa, Ontario - July 23, 2009 in Winnipeg, Manitoba) was a politician in the Canadian province of Manitoba. He was a member of the Legislative Assembly of Manitoba from 1988 to 1990, representing the northeast Winnipeg riding of Radisson for the Manitoba Liberal Party.

The son of Harold Allan Patterson and Emma Lucille Denny, he was educated in Capreol, in Barrie, at the Ontario Agricultural College, the University of Western Ontario and the University of Minnesota. He was a lecturer at the University of Western Ontario's School of Business Administration from 1967 to 1969, and a professor in the Faculty of Management at the University of Manitoba from 1974 to 1988. Before teaching, Patterson was employed with the Dominion Rubber Company Limited Tire Division in Kitchener and Winnipeg and the T. Eaton Co. Limited in Winnipeg. He was also a National Executive Member of the Canadian Industrial Relations Association, and served as the Manitoba Liberal Party's Chief Financial Officer.

Patterson married Edith Charlotte Freed.

Patterson first ran for the Manitoba legislature in the provincial election of 1986, finishing third in Radisson with 1,239 votes (incumbent New Democrat Gerard Lecuyer was re-elected with 4,810 votes). Two years later, in the provincial election of 1988, Patterson defeated Lecuyer by 1,805 votes. This was a period of increased support for the Liberals, who increased their parliamentary representation from one to twenty in the 1988 election.

This rise in Liberal support proved to be transient, and Patterson was defeated in the provincial election of 1990, finishing in third place with 1,925 votes. New Democrat Marianne Cerilli recaptured the riding for her party with 4,055 votes. Patterson did not seek a return to political life after this time.

Patterson later served as a board member on the Winnipeg Public Library.

He died in the St. Boniface Hospital at the age of 90.

== Election results ==
1986 Manitoba general election: Radisson
Party	Candidate	Votes	%	±%
New Democratic	Gerard Lecuyer	4,810	53.71	-13.78
Progressive Conservative	Brian Benoit	2,666	29.77	+1.42
Liberal	Allan Patterson	1,239	13.84	New
Progressive	Herold Driedger	240	2.68	-1.47
Total valid votes		8,955	99.63	+0.03
Rejected		33	0.37	-0.03
Eligible voters / Turnout		12,924	69.55	-6.62
New Democratic hold		Swing		-7.60
Source(s) Source: Manitoba. Chief Electoral Officer (1999). Statement of Votes for the 37th Provincial General Election, September 21, 1999 (PDF) (Report). Winnipeg: Elections Manitoba.

1988 Manitoba general election: Radisson
Party	Candidate	Votes	%	±%
Liberal	Allan Patterson	4,918	44.39	+30.55
New Democratic	Gerard Lecuyer	3,113	28.10	-25.62
Progressive Conservative	John Samborski	3,049	27.52	-2.25
Total valid votes		11,080	99.68	+0.05
Rejected		36	0.32	-0.05
Eligible voters / turnout		14,346	77.49	+7.94
Liberal gain from New Democratic		Swing		+28.08
Source(s) Source: Manitoba. Chief Electoral Officer (1999). Statement of Votes for the 37th Provincial General Election, September 21, 1999 (PDF) (Report). Winnipeg: Elections Manitoba.

1990 Manitoba general election: Radisson
Party	Candidate	Votes	%	±%
New Democratic	Marianne Cerilli	4,055	46.76	18.66
Progressive Conservative	Mike Thompson	2,692	31.04	3.52
Liberal	Allan Patterson	1,925	22.20	-22.19
Total valid votes		8,672	–	–
Rejected		26	–	
Eligible voters / turnout		12,814	67.88	-9.61
New Democratic gain from Liberal		Swing		+20.42
Source(s) Source: Manitoba. Chief Electoral Officer (1999). Statement of Votes for the 37th Provincial General Election, September 21, 1999 (PDF) (Report). Winnipeg: Elections Manitoba.
