= The Filipino Journal =

The Filipino Journal is a newspaper published bimonthly in Winnipeg, Manitoba, Canada. It features not only Filipino news in Winnipeg and the Philippines but also topics on Filipino culture, arts, music, and literature. It was founded in 1987 by writers Rod and Rosalinda Cantiveros.

== See also ==
- List of newspapers in Canada
