= Workers Compensation Board of Manitoba =

Government agency of Manitoba, Canada

Board overview
- Formed: 1917
- Headquarters: 333 Broadway, Winnipeg, MB R3C 4W3
- Employees: 500
- Minister responsible: Malaya Marcelino, Minister of Labour and Immigration
- Board executives: Colin Robertson, Board Chair; Cathy Skinner, President & CEO (acting)
- Key document: The Workers Compensation Act, C.C.S.M. c. W200
- Website: wcb.mb.ca/

The Workers Compensation Board of Manitoba (WCB) is an agency of the Government of Manitoba that provides a system for workplace injury and disability insurance for workers and employers of Manitoba, paid for by employers.

Established in 1917 in accordance with The Workers Compensation Act, which was passed the previous year, WCB's creation was the result of a compromise: injured workers gave up the right to sue employers in exchange for no-fault insurance in the case of work-related injuries or illness, while employers agreed to pay for the system providing they would be protected from lawsuits. One of the problems that workers' compensation was created to solve, namely, the problem of employers becoming insolvent as a result of high damage awards. The system of collective liability was created to prevent that, and thus to ensure security of compensation to the workers. Individual immunity is the necessary corollary to collective liability.

WCB is run by a board of directors that consists of 10 members appointed by the Manitoba government from nominations submitted by labour, employers and the public. The chief executive officer (CEO) is a non-voting member of the board of directors. As of 2021, the current chairperson of the board of directors is Michael D. Werier, and the current president and CEO is Richard Deacon. As of 2019, the Workers Compensation Board of Manitoba has reported to Manitoba's Minister of Finance.

WCB's organizational ombudsman is the Fair Practices Office. SAFE Work Manitoba, a division of the Workers Compensation Board, is a public agency focused on the prevention of workplace injury and illness.

== The Workers Compensation Act ==
The Workers Compensation Act was passed in 1916, establishing the Workers Compensation Board the following year.

Assessments under the act are levied upon employers and gathered into a common fund out of which benefits are paid to workers who are injured as a result of their employment. Administration and adjudication are carried out by the Workers Compensation Board of Manitoba.

=== Minister responsible for The Workers Compensation Act ===
Since 1981, the Executive Council of Manitoba has included a Minister responsible for The Workers Compensation Act; however the specific ministerial designation has changed several times over the years, and the current position is not a full cabinet portfolio but rather is held by a minister with other cabinet responsibilities. For instance, most ministers responsible for the Workers Compensation Act have also been Ministers of Labour, though not necessarily.

As of 2023, the Workers Compensation Board of Manitoba has reported to Manitoba's Minister of Labour and Immigration.

The position was first held by Jay Cowan, who, in addition to overseeing other portfolios in cabinet, was designated as Minister responsible for the Workers Compensation Act and Minister responsible for The Workplace Safety and Health Act. In 1983, both positions were incorporated into the new cabinet portfolio of Workplace Safety and Health, the first minister for which was Gerard Lecuyer, who was also Minister of Environment. In 1991, the Workplace Safety and Health portfolio was eliminated.

==== List of ministers ====
Name	Party	Title(s)	Took office	Left office	Concurrent roles
Jay Cowan	NDP	Minister responsible for administration of The Workers Compensation Act; Minister responsible for administration of The Workers Compensation Act	November 30, 1981	November 4, 1983	Minister of Northern Affairs; Minister responsible for Environmental Management; administration of Clean Environment Act, The Communities Economic Development Fund Act
Gerard Lecuyer	NDP	Minister of Environment and Workplace and Health	November 4, 1983	May 9, 1988	
Harry Harapiak	NDP	Minister of Government Services & Workers Compensation Board	February 4, 1987	May 9, 1988	
Edward Connery	PC	Minister of Environment, Workplace Safety and Health; Minister responsible for Workers Compensation Act	May 9, 1988	February 5, 1991	Minister of Labour; Minister responsible for Civil Service Act, Civil Service Superannuation Act and Public Servants Insurance Act
Darren Praznik	PC	Minister responsible for Workers Compensation Act	February 5, 1991	May 9, 1995	Minister of Labour (1990–1995); Minister responsible for Civil Service Act, Civil Service Superannuation Act, Civil Service Special Supplementary Severance Benefit Act, Public Servants Insurance Act (1990–1995); Minister responsible for French Language Services (1991–1995)
Vic Toews	PC	Minister responsible for the administration of The Workers Compensation Act	May 9, 1995	January 6, 1997	Minister of Labour; Minister responsible for Civil Service Act, Civil Service Superannuation Act, Civil Service Special Superannuation Service Benefit Act, and Public Servants Insurance Act
Harold Gilleshammer	PC	Minister charged with the administration of The Workers Compensation Act	January 6, 1997	February 5, 1999	Minister of Labour; Minister charged with the administration of the Civil Service Act, The Civil Service Superannuation Act, The Civil Service Special Supplementary Severance Benefit Act (1983), The Public Servants Insurance Act
Mike Radcliffe	PC	Minister responsible for the administration of The Workers Compensation Act	February 5, 1999	October 5, 1999	Minister of Labour; Minister charged with the administration of the Civil Service Act, The Civil Service Superannuation Act, The Civil Service Special Supplementary Severance Benefit Act (1983), The Public Servants Insurance Act
Becky Barrett	NDP	Minister responsible for the administration of The Workers Compensation Act	October 5, 1999	June 25, 2003	Minister of Labour; Minister responsible for the administration of The Civil Service Act, The Civil Service Superannuation Act, The Civil Service Special Supplementary Severance Benefits Act (1983), The Public Servants Insurance Act
Steve Ashton	NDP	Minister charged with the administration of The Workers Compensation Act	June 25, 2003	November 4, 2003	Minister of Labour and Immigration; Minister responsible for Multiculturalism
Nancy Allan	NDP	Minister charged with the administration of The Workers Compensation Act	November 4, 2003	November 3, 2009	Minister of Labour and Immigration; Minister responsible for Multiculturalism; Minister responsible for the Status of Women
Jennifer Howard	NDP	Minister responsible for The Workers Compensation Act	November 3, 2009	January 13, 2012	Minister of Labour and Immigration; Minister responsible for Persons with Disabilities; Minister responsible for the Status of Women
Jennifer Howard	NDP	Minister responsible for The Workers Compensation Act	January 13, 2012	October 18, 2013	Minister of Family Services and Labour; Minister responsible for Persons with Disabilities; Minister responsible for the Status of Women; Government House Leader
Erna Braun	NDP	Minister responsible for The Workers Compensation Act	October 18, 2013	May 3, 2016	Minister of Labour and Immigration
Cliff Cullen	PC	N/A	May 3, 2016	August 17, 2017	Minister of Growth, Enterprise and Trade
Blaine Pedersen	PC	N/A	August 17, 2017	October 23, 2019	Minister of Growth, Enterprise and Trade
Scott Fielding	PC	N/A	August 1, 2018	January 18, 2022	Minister of Finance
Cameron Friesen	PC	N/A	January 18, 2022	January 30, 2023	Minister of Finance
