= Eva-Maria Auch =

Eva-Maria Auch (born September 21, 1955 in Lutherstadt Eisleben) is a German professor and author who specializes in Eastern European history, religion and politics. From 2010 to 2021, she held the endowed chair "History of Azerbaijan" at the Institute of History at Humboldt-Universität zu Berlin.

== Biography ==
Eva-Maria Auch was born in 1955 in the Lutherstadt Eisleben. She studied Arabic and Islamic Studies in Baku and also completed an additional diploma as a translator into Russian in Leipzig. In 1985, she completed a doctorate in Modern and Contemporary History at the Ernst-Moritz-Arndt-Universität Greifswald (EMAU), her subject was "Historical preconditions, course and results of the Libyan Fatih Revolution with special consideration of Islam in the social conception and domestic politics of its leaders (1969–1983)".

In 1991 she obtained a teaching license for Eastern European History at the EMAU Greifswald. In 1999 she received an honorary doctorate from Baku Western University. Her habilitation in Eastern European history followed in 2000, as well as the award of the Venia legendi and the appointment as a private lecturer. She then worked at the universities of Münster, Düsseldorf, Tübingen, Gießen and Bonn.

In 2010, she became Professor of "History of Azerbaijan" at the Institute of History at Humboldt-Universität zu Berlin. After her retirement in September 2021, the chair will not be continued.

== Publications ==
Monographs

- „Ewiges Feuer" in Aserbaidschan. Ein Land zwischen Perestrojka, Bürgerkrieg und Unabhängigkeit (= Berichte des Bundesinstituts für ostwissenschaftliche und internationale Studien, 1992,8). BOIS, Bonn 1992.
- Aserbaidschan. Demokratie als Utopie? (= Berichte des Bundesinstituts für ostwissenschaftliche und internationale Studien, 1994,33). BOIS, Bonn 1994.
- Öl und Wein am Kaukasus. Deutsche Forschungsreisende, Kolonisten und Unternehmer im vorrevolutionären Aserbaidschan. Reichert, Wiesbaden 2001, ISBN 3-89500-236-4.
- Muslim, Untertan, Bürger. Identitätswandel in gesellschaftlichen Transformationsprozessen der muslimischen Ostprovinzen Südkaukasiens. Reichert, Wiesbaden 2004, ISBN 3-89500-237-2.
- Historische Voraussetzungen, Verlauf und Ergebnisse der libyschen Fatih-Revolution unter besonderer Berücksichtigung der Gesellschaftskonzeption und Innenpolitik ihrer Führungskräfte (1969–1983). Dissertation, Universität Greifswald 1984.
- Die Aserbaidschanische Demokratische Republik (1918–1920). Das erste Jahr in Dokumenten. Verlag Dr. Kovač, Hamburg 2019, ISBN 978-3-339-10746-6.
- Deutsche im multikulturellen Umfeld Südkaukasiens. Ergon-Verlag, Würzburg 2017, ISBN 978-3-95650-240-8.
- Muslimisch-aserbaidschanische Eliten der Region Karabach zwischen Modernisierung und politischen Umbrüchen. Stiftung für die Wissenschaftsentwicklung, Baku 2017, ISBN 978-9952-516-06-7.
- Deutsche Winzer im multikulturellen Umfeld Aserbaidschans. Erinnerungsbericht des Julius Vohrer (1887–1979). Gebrüder Vohrer, Berlin 2011, ISBN 978-3-9814384-0-6.

Editorship

- Lebens- und Konfliktraum Kaukasien. Gemeinsame Lebenswelten und politische Visionen der kaukasischen Völker in Geschichte und Gegenwart. Edition Barkau, Großbarkau 1996, ISBN 3-928326-11-2.
- „Barbaren" und „weiße Teufel". Kulturkonflikte und Imperialismus in Asien vom 18. bis zum 20. Jahrhundert. Schöningh, Paderborn 1997, ISBN 3-506-70402-8.

Essays

- Chorgesang im historischen Kontext von kulturellen Topographien von Schichten der Identitätsstiftung und Entwicklungsproblemen der Zivilgesellschaft. Die Sicht der osteuropäischen Geschichte. In: Erik Fischer (Red.): Chorgesang als Medium von Interkulturalität. Formen, Kanäle, Diskurse. Steiner, Stuttgart 2007, ISBN 978-3-515-09011-7, S. 369–377.
- Zwischen Anpassung und kultureller Selbstbehauptung. Anfänge einer neuen Identitätssuche unter aserbaidschanischen Intellektuellen und das Entstehen einer neuen Öffentlichkeit am Beispiel von Theater und Musik zwischen 1875 und 1905. In: Jahrbuch Aserbaidschanforschung. Beiträge aus Politik, Wirtschaft, Geschichte und Literatur. Bd. 2, 2008, S. 119–147, ISSN 1864-1679.
- Zwischen Weinreben, Kupferminen und Bohrtürmen. Deutsche Spuren in Aserbaidschan. In: Ingrid Pfluger-Schindlbeck (Hrsg.): Aserbaidschan, Land des Feuers. Geschichte und Kultur im Kaukasus. Reimer, Berlin 2008, ISBN 978-3-496-02820-8, S. 147–172 (Katalog der gleichnamigen Ausstellung, Ethnologisches Museum Berlin, 27. August bis 16. November 2008).
