= Susan Auch =

Canadian speed skater

Medal record

Representing Canada

Olympic Games

Women's speed skating
Silver medal – second place	1994 Lillehamer	500m
Silver medal – second place	1998 Nagano	500m

Women's short track speed skating
Bronze medal – third place	1988 Calgary	3000m relay

Susan Margaret Auch (born March 1, 1966) is a Canadian former speed skater who competed in five Winter Olympics, winning bronze in the 3000m relay at the 1988 Winter Olympics in Calgary, and the silver in the 500 m events at the 1994 Winter Olympics in Lillehammer, Norway and the 1998 games at Nagano, Japan. In 1999, Auch announced her retirement from competition, but changed her mind and competed in a fifth Winter Olympics, the 2002 games at Salt Lake City, but didn't reach the podium and retired after those games.

Winnipeg's long track speed skating oval is the "Susan Auch Speed Skating Oval."

She was inducted into the Manitoba Sports Hall of Fame and Museum in 2003, the Canadian Olympic Hall of Fame in 2010, and Canada's Sports Hall of Fame in 2015.

She ran as a Progressive Conservative in Winnipeg's Assiniboia constituency during the 2011 Manitoba provincial election but came in second to the incumbent New Democratic Party legislator Jim Rondeau.

She ran as an independent candidate in the 2025 by-election in Winnipeg's Transcona constituency, which was called shortly after the death of Nello Altomare. Auch finished in Fourth place with 208 Votes.

== Electoral record ==
Manitoba provincial by-election, March 18, 2025: Transcona Death of Nello Altomare
Party	Candidate	Votes	%	±%	Expenditures
New Democratic	Shannon Corbett	3,616	64.22	+5.95	
Progressive Conservative	Shawn Nason	1,569	27.86	-7.48	
Liberal	Brad Boudreau	217	3.85	-2.18	
Independent	Susan Auch	208	3.69		
Total valid votes/expense limit		5,610	–		
Total rejected and declined ballots		21	–		
Turnout		5,631			
Eligible voters		17,962			

2011 Manitoba general election: Assiniboia
Party	Candidate	Votes	%	±%	Expenditures
New Democratic	Jim Rondeau	5,095	58.22	-3.99	$36,949.80
Progressive Conservative	Susan Auch	3,258	37.23	4.95	$46,399.77
Green	Anlina Sheng	204	2.33	–	$1.00
Liberal	Moe Bokhari	194	2.22	-3.30	$1,812.80
Total valid votes		8,751	99.61	–	
Rejected/Declined Ballots		34	0.39		
Eligible voters / turnout		14,170	62.00	0.15	
Source(s) Source: Manitoba. Chief Electoral Officer (2011). Statement of Votes for the 40th Provincial General Election, October 4, 2011 (PDF) (Report). Winnipeg: Elections Manitoba. "Election Returns: 40th General Election". Elections Manitoba. 2011.

== See also ==
- Manitoba Sports Hall of Fame and Museum
