= Abe Kovnats =

Canadian politician (1928–1996)

Abe Kovnats (March 22, 1928 in St. Boniface, Manitoba – March 6, 1996) was a politician in Manitoba, Canada. He was a member of the Legislative Assembly of Manitoba from 1977 to 1988, serving as a member of the Progressive Conservative Party.

== Early life and career ==
The son of Michael Kovnats and Mary Silverman, he was educated at the University of Manitoba. Before entering political life, he ran a company in the parking business and worked as a referee in the Canadian Football League. In 1956, he married Donna Catherine Maloney.

== Political career ==
Kovnats first ran for the Manitoba legislature in the provincial election of 1973, losing to New Democrat Harry Shafransky in the riding of Radisson by about 600 votes. In the provincial election of 1977, he defeated Shafransky by about 800 votes as the Progressive Conservatives formed a majority government under Sterling Lyon. Kovnats was not called to become a member of cabinet, but was named Deputy Speaker in 1978.

In the 1981 provincial election, Kovnats was re-elected over NDP candidate Lloyd Schreyer by about 700 votes in the redistributed riding of Niakwa. In 1983, he supported Gary Filmon's bid to become party leader.

He was an opponent of the legal retrenchment of French language services in Manitoba in 1984, and was re-elected with an increased majority in the 1986 provincial election.

Kovnats was defeated by Liberal candidate Herold Driedger in the 1988 provincial election, ironically as the Progressive Conservatives formed a minority government. Had he been re-elected, he probably would have served as a cabinet minister in the government of Gary Filmon. He did not seek a return to political life before his death in 1996.

== Death ==
Kovnats died at his winter home in Lady Lake, Florida, at the age of 67.

== Honours ==
In 2013, he was inducted into the Football Manitoba Hall of Fame as an official.

Preceded by new riding	Member of the Manitoba Legislative Assembly for Niakwa; 1980-1988	Succeeded by Herold Driedger
