= Bidhu Jha =

Canadian politician

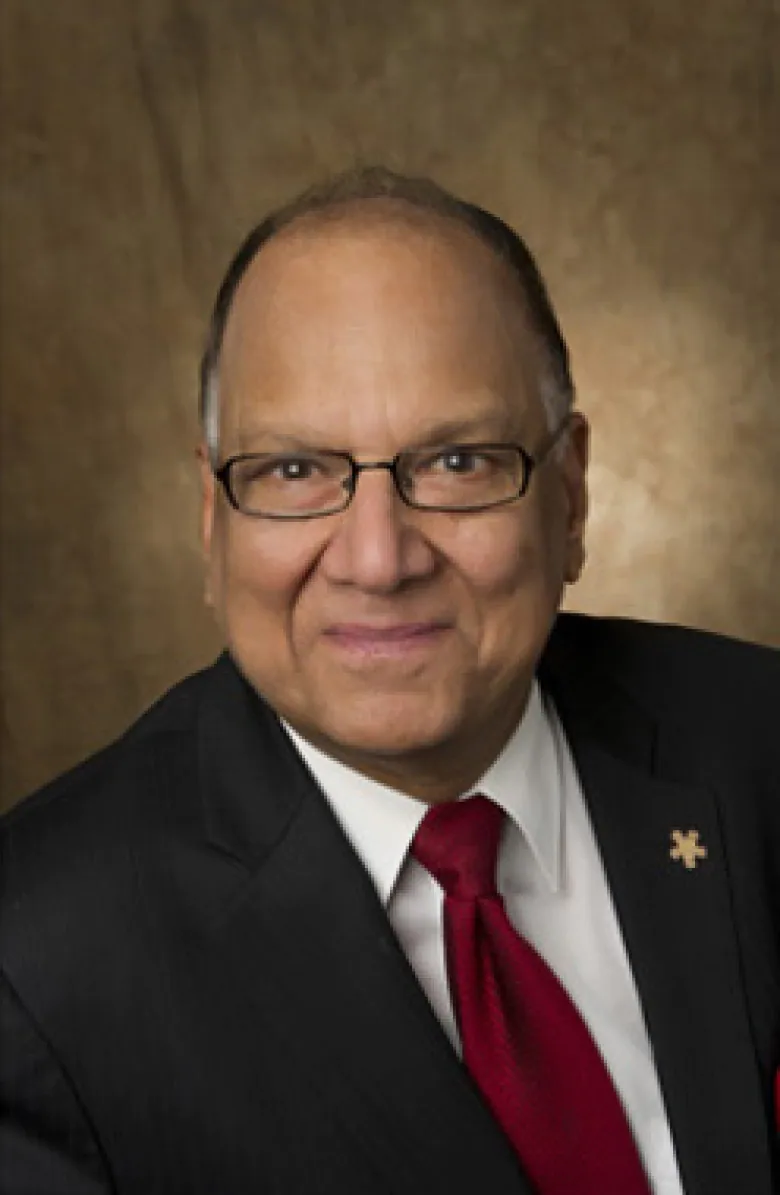

Member of the Legislative Assembly of Manitoba for Radisson
- In office June 3, 2003 – April 19, 2016
- Preceded by: Marianne Cerilli
- Succeeded by: James Teitsma

Personal details
- Born: Bidhu Shekhar Jha; August 4, 1942 (age 84) Deoghar, Bihar, India (now Jharkhand, India)
- Party: New Democratic
- Children: Prabhat Jha
- Education: BIT Sindri; University of Manitoba
- Occupation: Engineer

Bidhu Shekhar Jha (born August 4, 1942) is a Canadian politician in Manitoba, Canada. He was a member of the Legislative Assembly of Manitoba from 2003 to 2016, representing the Winnipeg division of Radisson as a member of the New Democratic Party.

== Early life and career ==
Jha was born in Deoghar, Bihar, now a part of the Indian state of Jharkhand. He has a degree in mechanical engineering from BIT Sindri, and has taken postgraduate training in industrial engineering and management. He moved to Canada in 1969 and founded Optimum Ergonomics Ltd. in 1978, specializing in office and computer furnishings. He later founded the Optimum Technology Corporation, specializing in international trade and business development.

Jha authored the screenplay for a full-length feature film entitled Namumkin (1988), telling the story of an Asian family exiled from Idi Amin's Uganda. He later served as president of Winnipeg's Indian Association, and led a flag-raising ceremony in 1997 to celebrate the fiftieth anniversary of India's independence. In 2001, he organized a dinner for British Columbia Premier Ujjal Dosanjh to mark his selection as Canada's first provincial leader of South Asian background.

Jha served on the board of Manitoba Telephone System in 1986–87, and has also served on the boards of the Canadian Cancer Society and Deer Lodge Foundation. In 2002, he received a Queen's Golden Jubilee Medal and an Asia Pacific Award of Entrepreneurship from the Asper School of Business at the University of Manitoba. He was 63 years old as of 2006.

== Political career ==
Jha ran for the Manitoba legislature in the 1999 provincial election, and lost to Progressive Conservative candidate John Loewen in the south Winnipeg division of Fort Whyte. The New Democratic Party won a majority government across the province. After the election, Jha was appointed to the Board of the Manitoba Crown Corporations Council. He later chaired a Taxi-Cab Safety Working Group, which was convened after five Winnipeg drivers were murdered over the course of ten years. He issued a report calling for the installation of safety shields, cameras and recording devices; safety shields were made mandatory in 2002.

Jha was elected for the northeast Winnipeg division of Radisson in the 2003 general election, as the NDP won a second consecutive majority government across the province. On November 4, 2003, he was appointed Legislative Assistant to the Minister of Energy, Science and Technology. The following year, he was named as Legislative Assistant to the Premier. He played an active role in securing repairs for the Prendergast Community Centre, and accompanied Premier Gary Doer on a trade mission to India in 2006.

Jha broke ranks with his government in 2005 to oppose the construction of a large hog-processing facility in the Radisson division. Many of his constituents were against the project, and Jha argued that the facility should be built outside of the city. In response to criticism, Premier Doer announced in 2007 that the plant would not be constructed.

Some believed that Jha's seat would be vulnerable in the 2007 provincial election, but he was re-elected by an increased margin. Jha has won the seat for the third time in a row in 2011.

== Electoral record ==
2011 Manitoba general election: Radisson
| Party | Candidate | Votes | % | ±% | Expenditures |
|---|---|---|---|---|---|
| New Democratic | Bidhu Jha | 5,033 | 55.14 | -1.58 | $27,139.08 |
| Progressive Conservative | Desmond Penner | 3,588 | 39.31 | 4.03 | $29,251.37 |
| Liberal | Shirley Robert | 506 | 5.54 | -2.45 | $1,414.15 |
| Total valid votes | | 9,127 | – | – | |
| Rejected | | 33 | – | | |
| Eligible voters / turnout | | 14,899 | 61.48 | 1.24 | |
| New Democratic hold | | Swing | | -2.83 | |
Source(s) Source: Manitoba. Chief Electoral Officer (2011). Statement of Votes for the 40th Provincial General Election, October 4, 2011 (PDF) (Report). Winnipeg: Elections Manitoba. "Election Returns: 40th General Election". Elections Manitoba. 2011.

2007 Manitoba general election: Radisson
| Party | Candidate | Votes | % | ±% | Expenditures |
|---|---|---|---|---|---|
| New Democratic | Bidhu Jha | 4,804 | 56.72 | 4.28 | $38,067.77 |
| Progressive Conservative | Linda West | 2,988 | 35.28 | -3.85 | $31,483.45 |
| Liberal | Murray James Cliff | 677 | 7.99 | -0.42 | $0.00 |
| Total valid votes | | 8,469 | – | – | |
| Rejected | | 57 | – | | |
| Eligible voters / turnout | | 14,154 | 60.24 | 6.19 | |
| New Democratic hold | | Swing | | +4.06 | |
Source(s) Source: Manitoba. Chief Electoral Officer (2007). Statement of Votes for the 39th Provincial General Election, May 22, 2007 (PDF) (Report). Winnipeg: Elections Manitoba.

2003 Manitoba general election: Radisson
| Party | Candidate | Votes | % | ±% | Expenditures |
|---|---|---|---|---|---|
| New Democratic | Bidhu Jha | 3,888 | 52.45 | -2.57 | $26,913.04 |
| Progressive Conservative | Linda West | 2,901 | 39.13 | 6.17 | $17,661.88 |
| Liberal | Murray Cliff | 624 | 8.42 | -3.61 | $2,277.16 |
| Total valid votes | | 7,413 | – | – | |
| Rejected | | 37 | – | | |
| Eligible voters / turnout | | 13,783 | 54.05 | -17.04 | |
| New Democratic hold | | Swing | | -4.37 | |
Source(s) Source: Manitoba. Chief Electoral Officer (2003). Statement of Votes for the 38th Provincial General Election, June 3, 2003 (PDF) (Report). Winnipeg: Elections Manitoba.

1999 Manitoba general election: Fort Whyte
| Party | Candidate | Votes | % | Expenditures |
|---|---|---|---|---|
| Progressive Conservative | John Loewen | 6,480 | 61.73 | $25,444.88 |
| New Democratic | Bidhu Jha | 2,815 | 26.82 | $24,511.00 |
| Liberal | Malli Aulakh | 1,202 | 11.45 | $18,808.08 |
| Total valid votes | | 10,497 | 99.38 | |
| Rejected and declined votes | | 66 | 0.62 | |
| Turnout | | 10,563 | 76.43 | |
| Registered voters | | 13,821 | | |

All electoral information is taken from Elections Manitoba. Expenditure entries refer to individual candidate expenses.
