= 2024 Elmwood—Transcona federal by-election =

Federal by-election in Manitoba, Canada

2024 Elmwood—Transcona by-election
- September 16, 2024

Riding of Elmwood—Transcona
- Turnout: 39.08% (▼8.73)
	First party	Second party
	NDP	CPC
Candidate	Leila Dance	Colin Reynolds
Party	New Democratic	Conservative
Popular vote	13,606	12,448
Percentage	48.14%	44.05%
Swing	▼1.55 pp	▲15.92 pp
- Elmwood-Transcona By-Election Results
MP before election
Daniel Blaikie
NDP
Elected MP
Leila Dance
NDP

A by-election was held in the federal riding of Elmwood—Transcona in Manitoba, Canada, on September 16, 2024, following the resignation of incumbent New Democratic MP Daniel Blaikie.

The race was considered to be a battle between the Conservatives and the NDP, which has long held the constituency.

The by-election was held on the same day as one in LaSalle—Émard—Verdun in Quebec.

With Liberal candidate Ian MacIntyre acquiring 4.83% of the vote, the election results marked the Liberal Party's worst election performance in Winnipeg, and is the first time in history that the Liberal Party received less than 5% of the vote in any Winnipeg riding.

== Background ==
The riding of Elmwood—Transcona was vacated on March 31, 2024, following the resignation of NDP MP Daniel Blaikie.

=== Constituency ===
The constituency is a suburban riding located in the north-eastern parts of the city of Winnipeg. It is considered a working class riding, and contains the areas of East Kildonan, Elmwood, Transcona and part of North Kildonan. There is a large presence of industry in the area.

The riding is considered a stronghold for the New Democratic Party, who have won every election in the riding since its creation in 1988, except for in 2011. Prior to 1988, the NDP held the riding's predecessor of Winnipeg—Birds Hill since its creation in 1979. Elmwood-Transcona is the only federal riding in Manitoba where the two competitive parties are the New Democrats and Conservatives.

=== Candidates ===
On May 22, Leila Dance, the executive director of the Transcona Business Improvement Zone won the NDP nomination over Leilani Esteban, the executive director of the Chalmers Neighbourhood Renewal Corporation.

On July 19, Conservative Party announced Colin Reynolds, a construction electrician as their candidate. He has described himself as a proud union member. Lawrence Toet, MP for Elmwood—Transcona, from 2011 to 2015 was considered a potential candidate for the Conservatives.

On July 25, the Liberal Party nominated Ian MacIntyre, a retired teacher and union leader.

Russ Wyatt, Winnipeg city councillor for Transcona, 2002 to 2018, and 2022 to present was pondering a run for either the NDP or the Conservatives. He said that he liked the NDP's domestic policies, but disliked their "woke nonsense," and he aligns with the Conservatives on international views and foreign policy. Ultimately, he decided not to run.

On July 2, the Green Party announced that Nic Geddert had won the nomination race to be their candidate.

The People's Party originally chose Byron Gryba as their candidate. However, the party later registered Sarah Couture as the candidate.

On August 20, the Canadian Future Party announced Zbig Strycharz would be their candidate. He is one of the two first candidates to participate in any race under the CFP.

== Campaign ==
In May 2024, NDP leader Jagmeet Singh visited the riding. In July 2024, Conservative leader Pierre Poilievre visited the riding and held a rally. In August 2024, People's Party Leader Maxime Bernier gathered with supporters in the riding.

Advance voting was open from September 6–9 and over 10,000 people cast a vote.

== Results ==
Canadian federal by-election, September 16, 2024: Elmwood—Transcona Resignation of Daniel Blaikie
Party	Candidate	Votes	%	±%
New Democratic	Leila Dance	13,597	48.18	-1.51
Conservative	Colin Reynolds	12,415	44.00	+15.87
Liberal	Ian MacIntyre	1,362	4.83	-9.92
Green	Nicolas Geddert	360	1.28	-0.34
People's	Sarah Couture	353	1.25	-4.57
Canadian Future	Zbig Strycharz	132	0.47	—
Total valid votes		28,219	99.62	
Total rejected ballots		107	0.38	
Turnout		28,326	39.16	-20.46
Eligible voters		72,325		
New Democratic hold		Swing		-8.73
Source: Elections Canada

== 2021 results ==
2021 Canadian federal election: Elmwood—Transcona
Party	Candidate	Votes	%	±%	Expenditures
New Democratic	Daniel Blaikie	20,791	49.69	+4.07	$63,992.50
Conservative	Rejeanne Caron	11,768	28.13	-9.32	$53,284.18
Liberal	Sara Mirwaldt	6,169	14.74	+2.42	$10,073.29
People's	Jamie Cumming	2,435	5.82	+4.64	$276.86
Green	Devlin Hinchey	676	1.62	-1.80	$0.00
Total valid votes/expense limit		41,839	99.26	–	$106,782.98
Total rejected ballots		314	0.74	+0.03	
Turnout		42,153	59.62	-2.72	
Eligible voters		70,701			
New Democratic hold		Swing		+6.69	
Source: Elections Canada

== See also ==
- By-elections to the 44th Canadian Parliament
- 2024 LaSalle—Émard—Verdun federal by-election
