= Colin Reynolds =

Canadian politician

Colin Reynolds MP

Member of Parliament for Elmwood—Transcona
- Incumbent
- Assumed office April 28, 2025
- Preceded by: Leila Dance

Personal details
- Party: Conservative
- Children: 3
- Occupation: Politician; electrician
- Website: MP website

Colin Reynolds MP is a Canadian politician serving as a member of Parliament (MP) representing the riding of Elmwood—Transcona since 2025. A member of the Conservative Party, he was elected in the 2025 federal election by beating the incumbent Leila Dance. He previously ran unsuccessfully as a candidate in the 2024 Elmwood—Transcona by-election, which was won by Leila Dance.

Before entering Parliament, Reynolds was a construction electrician.

At the time of the 2025 Canadian federal election, he lived in St. Clements, Manitoba.

== Electoral record ==
2025 Canadian federal election: Elmwood—Transcona
** Preliminary results — Not yet official **
Party	Candidate	Votes	%	±%	Expenditures
Conservative	Colin Reynolds	19,463	41.60	+13.15	
New Democratic	Leila Dance	16,138	34.49	–14.63	
Liberal	Ian MacIntyre	10,469	22.38	+7.50	
People's	Collin Watson	396	0.85	–5.10	
Green	Nicolas Geddert	314	0.69	–0.90	
Total valid votes/expense limit					
Total rejected ballots					
Turnout		46,787	65.42		
Eligible voters		71,516			
Conservative notional gain from New Democratic		Swing		+13.89	
Source: Elections Canada

Canadian federal by-election, September 16, 2024: Elmwood—Transcona Resignation of Daniel Blaikie
Party	Candidate	Votes	%	±%
New Democratic	Leila Dance	13,597	48.18	-1.51
Conservative	Colin Reynolds	12,415	44.00	+15.87
Liberal	Ian MacIntyre	1,362	4.83	-9.92
Green	Nicolas Geddert	360	1.28	-0.34
People's	Sarah Couture	353	1.25	-4.57
Canadian Future	Zbig Strycharz	132	0.47	—
Total valid votes		28,219	99.62	
Total rejected ballots		107	0.38	
Turnout		28,326	39.16	-20.46
Eligible voters		72,325		
New Democratic hold		Swing		-8.73
Source: Elections Canada
