= Thomas Glendenning Hamilton =

Canadian politician, doctor, and spiritualist (1873–1935)

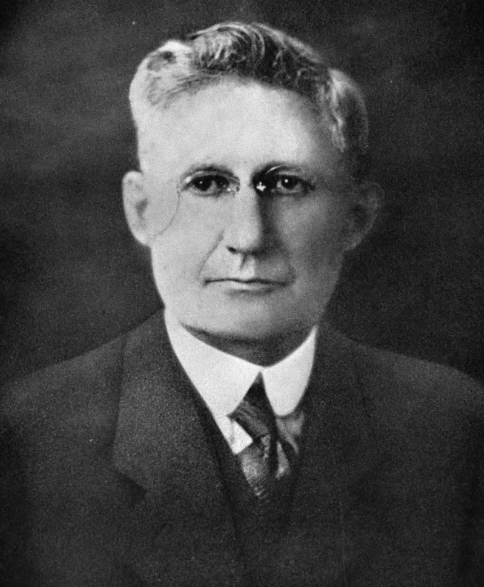
Hamilton in 1950

Thomas Glendenning Hamilton (November 27, 1873 – April 7, 1935) was a Canadian doctor, school board trustee, and member of the Manitoba legislature from 1915 to 1920. He was also a spiritualist and is best known for the thousands of photographs he took during séances held in his home in Winnipeg in the early 1900s. His wife, Lillian May Hamilton, and his daughter, Margaret Hamilton Bach, were co-researchers and continued his work after he died.

== Life ==
T.G. Hamilton was born in 1873, in Agincourt (now part of Toronto), the son of James Hamilton and Isabella Glendenning. When he was ten, the Hamiltons and their six children moved to Saskatchewan to homestead near Saskatoon. Not long after, two tragedies occurred in rapid succession: Hamilton's father died in 1885, and a year later, his sister Margaret died of typhoid fever. This and the availability of educational opportunities elsewhere led the family to abandon Saskatchewan in 1891 to move to Winnipeg. Hamilton was educated at Manitoba College and the Manitoba Medical College, graduating as an M.D. from the latter in 1903. He lectured in medical jurisprudence and clinical surgery at the Manitoba Medical College and was an assistant surgeon at Winnipeg General Hospital. He married Lillian May Forrester three years later and in 1910 set up a private medical practice in a home, later known as Hamilton House, located on what is now Henderson Highway in Elmwood, a suburb of Winnipeg. He and Lillian had four children: Margaret and Glen, and in 1915, the twins Arthur Lamont and James Drummond. In terms of religion, the Hamiltons were Presbyterian and later members of the United Church of Canada.

Besides being a medical practitioner in his own city, Hamilton became a Fellow of the American College of Surgeons in 1920, president of the Manitoba Medical Association in 1921–22, founder and first editor of the Manitoba Medical Bulletin, and president of the Canadian Medical Association in 1922. He was an elder of King Memorial church for 28 years. Hamilton served on the public school board for nine years from 1906 to 1915, one year as chairman. He was the first president of the University of Manitoba Alumni Association in 1921 and became the first president of the Winnipeg Society for Psychical Research in 1931.

Hamilton also served in the Legislative Assembly of Manitoba from 1915 to 1920 as a member of the Liberal Party. He first sought election in the 1914 provincial election and lost to Conservative Harry Mewhirter by 364 votes in the Elmwood constituency. He ran again in the 1915 election and defeated new Conservative candidate Donald Munro by 1,453 votes. The Liberals won a landslide majority in this election, and Hamilton served as a backbench supporter of Tobias Norris's government for the next five years.

Hamilton sought re-election in the 1920 provincial election, in the restructured ten-member constituency of Winnipeg. Members were elected by a single transferable ballot. Hamilton finished in twentieth place on the first count, with 786 votes, and was eliminated on the 22nd count.

== Paranormal investigations ==
In 1918, W.T. Allison, a professor of English at the University of Manitoba and a close friend of Hamilton's, returned from a visit to the American medium Pearl Curran and passed on his interest and enthusiasm for spiritual communication to Hamilton. In 1919, one of Hamilton's twin sons, Arthur, died at the age of three, a victim of the Spanish flu. Hamilton's daughter Margaret attributed the family's lifelong search for life after death to this event. Her father's grief was profound. Her mother, having read Frederic William Henry Myers's book Human Personality and Its Survival of Bodily Death, encouraged her husband to investigate the phenomenon.

Hamilton began with the use of a Ouija board and experiments with telepathy with his United Church minister, Reverend Daniel Normal McLachlan. The family's first medium was their Scottish nanny, Elizabeth Poole. She started out by using the Ouija board but moved on in 1920 when the family was introduced to table tipping, where a table would stop tipping when the "correct" letter was pronounced aloud, somewhat akin to the Ouija board. This led to investigations into telekinesis, or the movement of physical objects through mental exertions. By now, Hamilton had established a separate room on the second floor of the house, which was to be kept locked at all times when not in use. He wanted to investigate paranormal phenomena such as rappings, psychokinesis, ectoplasm, and materializations under scientific conditions that would minimize any possibility of error. A red bulb in the centre of the room provided light. A bank of about a dozen cameras were focussed on the side of the room where activity was to take place, their shutters open, waiting for Hamilton to set off a flash in order for them to all take photos at the same time. A three-sided wooden cabinet that he constructed, open on one side, was used in the telekinesis experiments, where Poole would charge a small table by laying her hands on it, causing it to move from the cabinet.

By 1928, Poole introduced the Hamilton family to two Scottish sisters-in-law, Mary Ann Marshall and Susan Marshall, also known as Dawn and Mercedes. These two women became regular mediums at the Hamiltons' "home circles". The family would invite friends and members of the community to participate in their séances. Many of the persons who attended the home circles were also doctors and businessmen, such as the lawyer Isaac Pitblado and Rh blood specialist Bruce Chown. The first table rappings and table tiltings of "Elizabeth M", as Poole was known, were followed by clairvoyance, trance states, automatic writing, visions, then the manifestations of materializations, wax molds, bell ringing, and finally in 1928, ectoplasm. As a spiritualist, Hamilton believed ectoplasm to be materializations from the spirit world. He photographed the ectoplasm, and Lillian took notes of what occurred in the second-floor room in Hamilton House. Margaret also served as recording secretary for many of her father's experiments. Skeptics investigating Hamilton's work have suggested that the ectoplasm shown in the photographs could be made of tissue paper and cut-out photographs of people.

At first, the Hamiltons' investigations into the paranormal were held in secret. They eventually went public in 1926, with T.G. delivering a lecture on his research on telekinesis to the Winnipeg Medical Society. From that time until his death, Hamilton delivered 86 lectures and wrote numerous articles published in Canada and abroad. His fame spread, and the Hamilton family's work became known in the United Kingdom, Europe, and the United States. Canadian Prime Minister William Lyon Mackenzie King and Americans Mina Crandon, the medium known as "Margery", and her husband, L.R.G. Crandon, all travelled to Winnipeg to participate in the Hamiltons' séances. Among those who worked with Hamilton were Ada Turner and her adopted son Harold Turner. Harold, or "Norman", as he is called in the Hamilton records, was interviewed by Norman James Williamson about his experience with the Hamilton group in 1982. When Arthur Conan Doyle, author of the Sherlock Holmes series, came to Winnipeg as part of a cross-North American tour in 1923, he attended one of the Hamiltons' home circles. After his death, the Hamiltons tried to contact Conan Doyle by mediumship. In 1935, Hamilton died suddenly of a heart attack, and his wife and daughter continued his work. Lillian and her son James Drummond produced a summary of Hamilton's work in the book Intention and Survival, published in 1942. When Lillian died in 1956, Margaret carried on. She wrote a series of articles in 1957 for Psychic News in England. These were collected into a booklet and also circulated to daily papers throughout Canada. Margaret later produced a second edition of Intention and Survival, in 1977; a third edition came out in 1980.

== Archival legacy ==
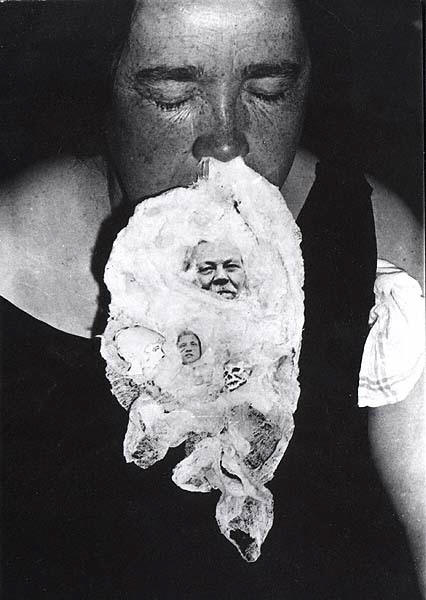
A photograph taken by Hamilton of the medium Mary Marshall revealing tissue paper and cut-out heads from newspapers.

The Hamilton family left a rich legacy. Lillian compiled several scrapbooks of photos and other materials for her children. Margaret, however, was the one who collected all the papers from the family dealing with their paranormal research and deposited them with the University of Manitoba Archives & Special Collections. The family's fonds, or papers, consist of 2.5 linear metres of textual and other materials and include scrapbooks, séance attendance records and registers, affidavits, automatic writings, correspondence, speeches and lectures, news clippings, journal articles, photographs, glass plate negatives and positives, prints, slides, audio tapes, manuscripts, and promotional materials related to major publications. The materials date from 1919–1986 and since their deposit have been supplemented by other related collections. A companion research grant established by the Hamilton family provides funds for researchers to travel to Winnipeg to study these and other archival collections.

While these archives have held a strong attraction for those interested in the paranormal, they have also stimulated artistic and cultural expressions. Hamilton's photographs have appeared in art exhibits throughout Canada, from the Dunlop Art Gallery in Regina, Saskatchewan, to the Prefix Institute of Contemporary Art in Toronto. Internationally, his photos were included in the "Spiritus" exhibit at Magasin3 Stockholm Konsthall in Sweden in 2003. In 2005, they appeared in "The Perfect Medium: Photography and the Occult", an exhibition held at the Maison européenne de la photographie in Paris and the Metropolitan Museum of Art in New York. Later that year, they were featured in the symposium "Dark Rooms: Photography and Invisibility", hosted by Princeton University. Hamilton's photographs and his family's archives are a major component of the work of Belfast artist Susan MacWilliam, which appeared in the 2009 Venice Biennale. They are also featured in the 2009 book Susan MacWilliam: Remote Viewing.

Beyond art exhibitions, the Hamilton archives have stimulated work in a number of other art forms. In 2007, they were the focus of the play "The Elmwood Visitation" by Winnipeg playwright Carolyn Gray, which won her the Manitoba Day Award for excellence in archival research from the Association for Manitoba Archives. The play was later published by Scirocco Drama under the same name. The archives also provided the historic theme for the novel Widows of Hamilton House by Christina Penner in 2008. Hamilton's photos have appeared in films, including Guy Maddin's My Winnipeg (2008) and the horror production The Haunting in Connecticut (2009), among others. The television series Northern Mysteries featured Hamilton in an episode titled "Spiritualism" in 2005, and he was the focus of the television documentary Chasing Hamilton's Ghost, as part of the Manitoba Moments series in 2005.

== Bibliography ==
- Hamilton, Margaret Lillian. Is Survival a Fact? Studies of Deep-trance Automatic Scripts and the Bearing of Intentional Actions by the Trance Personalities on the Question of Human Survival. London: Psychic Press, 1969.
- Hamilton, T. Glen. Intention and Survival: Psychical Research Studies and the Bearing of Intentional Actions by Trance Personalities on the Problem of Human Survival, edited by J.D. Hamilton. Toronto: Macmillan, 1942. ISBN 0-7212-0490-2
- Hamilton, T. Glen. Intention and Survival: Psychical Research Studies and the Bearing of Intentional Actions by Trance Personalities on the Problem of Human Survival, 2nd Edition, edited by Margaret Lillian Hamilton. London: Regency Press, 1977. ISBN

0721204902

- Keshavjee, S. (Ed.). (2023). The Art of Ectoplasm : Encounters with Winnipeg's Ghost Photographs (first edition). University of Manitoba Press.
- McMullin, Stan. Anatomy of a Seance: A History of Spirit Communication in Central Canada, Montreal: McGill-Queen's University Press, 2004. ISBN 0-7735-2665-X
