= Alexander Turk =

Canadian politician

MLA
- In office 1953–1958 Serving with Morris Gray, John Hawryluk, Bill Kardash
- Preceded by: Frank Chester
- Succeeded by: riding dissolved
- Constituency: Winnipeg North (multiple member constituency)

Personal details
- Born: March 5, 1906 Larne, Northern Ireland
- Died: January 1, 1988 (aged 81)
- Party: Liberal-Progressive
- Profession: sports owner

Alexander Turk (March 5, 1906 – January 1, 1988) was a professional wrestling promoter and politician in Manitoba, Canada. He served in the Legislative Assembly of Manitoba as a Liberal-Progressive from 1953 to 1958.

Born in Larne, Northern Ireland, the son of Nathaniel Turk and Mary O'Lynn, Turk came to Canada with his family in 1910 and was educated at Lord Selkirk School. In 1931, he married Annie Owens. He was a wrestling promoter and president of the Giants Baseball Club and was known in politics as a charismatic showman. Some credit him with introducing modern professional wrestling to Manitoba in 1946 with his company, the NWA-affiliated Alex Turk Promotions. In his later years, he would promote Verne Gagne, Pat O'Connor, Stu Hart, Bruno Sammartino, Haystacks Calhoun, Lou Thesz and others in the region. In 1961 and 1962, he promoted wrestling events for the American Wrestling Association. In 1963, he left the AWA and ran shows in competition with the AWA for several years. He was eventually pushed out of business by competition from the American Wrestling Association.

Turk's election to the Manitoba legislature was somewhat unexpected. In the 1953 election, he ran as a candidate of the Liberal-Progressive Party in Winnipeg North, a constituency dominated by the socialist Cooperative Commonwealth Federation and the communist Labour Progressive Party. He finished seventh out of eleven candidates on the multi-member constituency's first count, behind two other Liberal-Progressive candidates. He did well on transfers, however, and defeated fellow Liberal-Progressive J.M. Kozoriz for the final position. In the legislature, he served as a backbench supporter of Douglas Campbell's government.

Turk was on the left wing of the Liberal-Progressive Party. In 1954, he was the only member of the government caucus to support a CCF bill calling for comprehensive health insurance. The following year, he was the only Liberal-Progressive MLA to endorse a bill calling for progressive prison reforms.

Winnipeg's multi-member constituencies were eliminated in the 1958 election, and Turk lost to Steve Peters of the CCF by 856 votes in the newly created riding of Elmwood. He ran again in the 1959 election but finished third.

After leaving provincial politics, Turk was elected to the Winnipeg City Council. Though a member of the conservative Civic Election Committee, he again showed himself to be a progressive representative on issues relating to workers, pensioners, and people with disabilities, and he often voted with the CCF group. In 1964, he lost his seat on council to another CEC candidate.
