= Russell Doern =

Canadian politician

Member of the Legislative Assembly of Manitoba for Elmwood
- In office June 23, 1966 – March 18, 1986
- Preceded by: Steve Peters
- Succeeded by: Jim Maloway

Personal details
- Born: October 20, 1935 Winnipeg, Manitoba, Canada
- Died: February 19, 1987 (aged 51)
- Education: University of Manitoba

Russell John "Russ" Doern (October 20, 1935 – February 19, 1987) was a Manitoba politician. He served as a cabinet minister in the New Democratic government of Edward Schreyer (1969–1977), but left the New Democratic Party in 1984.

He was born in Winnipeg, Manitoba, the son of Karl John Doern and Ruby Henne, and was educated there and at the University of Manitoba. In 1955, he came second in the shot put and discus at the Junior Canadian Track and Field Competitions. He taught English and history at high schools in Winnipeg from 1959 to 1966. In the early 1960s, Doern became involved in the province's New Democratic Party organization.

Doern was first elected to the Manitoba legislature in the provincial election of 1966, for the northeastern Winnipeg riding of Elmwood. Like most other members of the NDP caucus, he believed that party leader Russell Paulley needed to be replaced before the next election. In 1968, he co-signed a letter which called for Edward Schreyer to lead the provincial party. Schreyer became party leader in 1969, and led the Manitoba NDP to its first-ever election victory later in the year.

Although left out of Schreyer's initial cabinet, Doern was appointed a Minister without Portfolio on November 4, 1970. He was promoted to Minister of Public Works on September 9, 1971, and held this position until the defeat of the Schreyer government in 1977.

Initially regarded as a supporter of youth and the arts (he had tried to book John Lennon for a concert in 1970), Doern eventually became associated with the more conservative wing of the NDP. When Schreyer resigned as party leader in 1979, Doern campaigned to succeed him. His campaign made some appeals to social conservatism (he strongly opposed any government recognition of gay rights), and was not respected by the party establishment. At the party's 1979 convention, he received the support of only 53 delegates, compared to 467 for winning candidate Howard Pawley.

In 1981, Doern published his memoirs from the Schreyer years, entitled Wednesdays Are Cabinet Days.

The NDP was returned to government in the provincial election of 1981, though Doern was not re-appointed to cabinet. He strongly opposed efforts by Premier Howard Pawley to legally entrench French-language services in the province (which he regarded as leading to official bilingualism), and created an organization called Manitoba Grassroots to coordinate opposition to the policy.

Doern left the NDP over this issue on March 7, 1984. In 1985, he published a book entitled "The Battle Over Bilingualism", detailing his role in the controversy.

Doern ran as an independent in the election of 1986. He polled a respectable 2006 votes, but was defeated by New Democratic candidate Jim Maloway.

Later in 1986, Doern ran an unsuccessful campaign to become mayor of Winnipeg, finishing second with 48,567 votes, against 78,998 for incumbent Bill Norrie. Doern's campaign was not exclusively focused on anti-bilingualism; he also emphasized public safety concerns. He was criticized in Winnipeg Free Press editorials as an opportunistic candidate who had previously shown little interest in municipal issues. Despite having left the NDP, Doern's electoral strength remained focused in the party's north-end stronghold.

According to reports from friends, Doern became extremely depressed after failing in his bid to become Mayor of Winnipeg. He wanted to return to active political service, but had few available options as an independent. Tory MLA Harry Enns has claimed that he saw Doern wandering aimlessly through the legislative buildings on several occasions during this period. Early in 1987, he made arrangements to host a radio talk-show on political affairs.

On February 19, 1987, Doern committed suicide at his cousin's barn in Overstoneville, Manitoba, in the southeastern section of the province. He killed himself with a single shot to the chest, using a gun he had borrowed from a friend a few days earlier. Doern had stopped taking anti-depressant medication by this time, and was by all accounts distraught by the fact that he had little chance to return to political life.

== Electoral record (partial) ==
1986 Manitoba general election: Elmwood
Party	Candidate	Votes	%	±%
New Democratic	Jim Maloway	3,241	45.84	-21.99
Independent	Russell Doern	2,006	28.37	–
Progressive Conservative	Ray Brunka	1,435	20.29	-4.91
Liberal	Gilbert Benoit	389	5.50	0.92
Total valid votes		7,071	–	–
Rejected		34	–	
Eligible voters / Turnout		11,044	64.33	-1.84
New Democratic hold		Swing		
Source(s) Source: Manitoba. Chief Electoral Officer (1999). Statement of Votes for the 37th Provincial General Election, September 21, 1999 (PDF) (Report). Winnipeg: Elections Manitoba.

1981 Manitoba general election: Elmwood
Party	Candidate	Votes	%	±%
New Democratic	Russell Doern	5,140	67.83	16.72
Progressive Conservative	Eveline Holtmann	1,910	25.20	-15.35
Liberal	Eric Wood	347	4.58	-3.76
Progressive	Curtis Bloodworth	181	2.39	–
Total valid votes		7,578	–	–
Rejected		36	–	
Eligible voters / Turnout		11,506	66.17	-6.17
Source(s) Source: Manitoba. Chief Electoral Officer (1999). Statement of Votes for the 37th Provincial General Election, September 21, 1999 (PDF) (Report). Winnipeg: Elections Manitoba.
