= Steve Peters (Manitoba politician) =

Canadian politician

Stephen Peters (27 December 1912 – 29 November 1976) was a politician in Manitoba, Canada. He served in the Manitoba legislature from 1958 to 1966, as a representative of the social-democratic Cooperative Commonwealth Federation and its successor, the New Democratic Party.

Peters was born in Winnipeg. The son of John Peters, he was educated at Winnipeg and the neighbouring suburb of Elmwood (later a part of the amalgamated city of Winnipeg), and worked for several years as a mechanic. Peters served in the Canadian military during World War II. He worked for Canada Packers, retiring in 1975. In 1939, Peters married Doris Marjorie Greustad. He was first elected to the Manitoba legislature in the 1958 provincial election, defeating incumbent Liberal-Progressive MLA Alexander Turk in the newly created riding of Elmwood, by a margin of about 800 votes.

Peters faced a strong challenge from Progressive Conservative candidate Emerson Snyder in the 1959 general election (in which the PCs won a majority government under the leadership of Dufferin Roblin). Peters was re-elected, but his majority was reduced to under 200 votes; Turk finished a distant third. Peters again faced a difficult re-election in 1962; he was again victorious, but the difference between himself and the third-place candidate was less than three hundred votes.

Peters's electoral strength in Elmwood was based on his strong connection to unionized labour in the community. He resigned from the legislature in 1966; the riding was subsequently held by Russell Doern, who turned it into a safer seat for the NDP.

He died in Winnipeg at the age of 63.
