= Jim Maloway =

Canadian politician (born 1952)

Jim Maloway MLA

Member of the Legislative Assembly of Manitoba for Elmwood
- Incumbent
- Assumed office October 4, 2011
- Preceded by: Bill Blaikie
- In office March 18, 1986 – August 29, 2008
- Preceded by: Russell Doern
- Succeeded by: Bill Blaikie

Member of Parliament for Elmwood—Transcona
- In office October 14, 2008 – May 2, 2011
- Preceded by: Bill Blaikie
- Succeeded by: Lawrence Toet

Dean of the Legislative Assembly of Manitoba
- Incumbent
- Assumed office March 16, 2016
- Preceded by: Steve Ashton

Personal details
- Born: Peter James Maloway; November 10, 1952 (age 73) Sioux Lookout, Ontario, Canada
- Party: New Democratic Party
- Education: University of Manitoba (BA)
- Occupation: Politician; insurance broker

Peter James Maloway (born November 10, 1952) is a Canadian politician, who has served as a member of both the House of Commons of Canada and the Legislative Assembly of Manitoba. He is the longest-serving current member of the Legislative Assembly of Manitoba.

He originally served in the Legislative Assembly of Manitoba from 1986 to 2008, representing Elmwood for the New Democratic Party of Manitoba. He was then elected to the House of Commons of Canada for the Winnipeg division of Elmwood—Transcona in the 2008 federal election as a member of the New Democratic Party, but was defeated by Conservative candidate Lawrence Toet in the 2011 federal election. He subsequently ran in the 2011 provincial election in his former provincial riding of Elmwood, winning re-election to the provincial legislature.

== Early life and career ==
Maloway was born in Sioux Lookout, Ontario, and holds a Bachelor of Arts degree in political science from the University of Manitoba (1975). He later worked for the Manitoba Liquor Control Commission as a liquor inspector, and was executive assistant to the Minister of Colleges and Universities and Tourism. He has owned the Maloway & Eliason Insurance & Travel Centre since 1978, operating it for many years with the late Magnus Eliason.

Maloway was the Returning Officer for the Winnipeg division of Wolseley in the 1973 provincial election. Official results on election night showed a tie between Manitoba Liberal Party leader Izzy Asper and New Democratic Party candidate Murdoch MacKay. Maloway initially cast a tiebreaking vote for MacKay, although a subsequent recount showed Asper elected by four votes.

Maloway joined the New Democratic Party in 1971. He was a candidate for the Winnipeg City Council in 1974 and 1983, and unsuccessfully sought the federal NDP nomination for Winnipeg North Centre in 1984.

== Member of the Legislative Assembly ==
Maloway was elected to the Manitoba legislature in the 1986 provincial election over incumbent Russell Doern, a former New Democrat who had left the party two years earlier. The NDP won a narrow majority government under Howard Pawley, and Maloway served as a government backbencher.

The Pawley government was unexpectedly defeated in the legislature in early 1988, when disgruntled backbencher Jim Walding voted with the opposition on a motion of non-confidence. Pawley resigned as party leader, but remained premier in a caretaker administration until a new provincial election could be held. Maloway supported Maureen Hemphill's bid to succeed Pawley in the leadership contest that followed; she finished fourth against Gary Doer.

The NDP entered the 1988 provincial election very low in the public opinion polls, and some insiders privately worried that the party could lose all of its seats. Maloway narrowly retained the Elmwood division against a strong challenge from the Liberal Party. The Progressive Conservatives under Gary Filmon won a minority government, while the NDP fell to third-party status. In opposition, Maloway served as his party's critic for Consumer and Corporate Affairs, and deputy critic for Finance.

Maloway was an opponent of the Meech Lake Accord, an unsuccessful attempt at constitutional reform that would have delegated powers from the federal government to the provinces and recognized Quebec as a distinct society within Canada. The accord required approval from all ten of Canada's provincial legislatures to be passed into law; Maloway supported the decision of fellow NDP MLA Elijah Harper to block the accord's passage through procedural tactics, and indicated that he considered taking a similar approach himself.

He was re-elected in the 1990 provincial election, defeating Progressive Conservative candidate Vic Toews. In 1991, he argued that Manitoba should adopt Quebec's system of no-fault auto insurance. He also argued that the Public Utilities Board should be given the power to regulate gas prices, in order to prevent price gouging.

Maloway was re-elected by an increased margin in 1995. He criticized the state of Manitoba's real estate sector later in the same year, arguing that it was being run in a haphazard manner. He later expressed concern that parts of Manitoba's Autopac system would be sold off to the private sector, and accused the Filmon government of privatizing the Manitoba Liquor Control Commission by stealth.

After eleven years in opposition, the New Democratic Party was returned to government in the 1999 provincial election. Maloway was returned in Elmwood without difficulty, and was re-elected again in 2003 and 2007 by significant margins. He sat as a backbench supporter of Gary Doer's government, and was described in a 2007 newspaper report as a left-leaning maverick.

Maloway criticized Winnipeg Mayor Glen Murray's "New Deal for Winnipeg" in the early 2000s, arguing that the city should correct its own finances instead of appealing for aid from other levels of government. In 2007, he criticized his party's decision to abandon its "one member, one vote" method of leadership selection and return to its former model of delegated conventions. He argued that the change would take power away from ordinary party members.

In May 2008, Maloway called on the provincial government to ensure that municipal repairs to the Disraeli Bridge in northeast Winnipeg would be carried out in a way that benefited the public interest. He expressed concern that traffic bottlenecks would occur if the bridge was completely blocked for several months, and called for the bridge to be expanded from four to six lanes. Some municipal politicians criticized this plan, and accused him of opportunism. Winnipeg Mayor Sam Katz launched into a personal attack on Maloway during a council debate, for which he was criticized by the Winnipeg Free Press newspaper.

== Federal politics ==
Maloway was among a group of Manitoba MLAs who sought to persuade former Manitoba Premier Edward Schreyer to run for the federal NDP leadership in 1989. He supported Lorne Nystrom's bid to become NDP leader in 1995, and endorsed Bill Blaikie in 2003.

After Blaikie announced his retirement from the House of Commons of Canada in 2007, Maloway indicated he would seek the NDP nomination to succeed him in the federal Elmwood—Transcona riding. He won the nomination over rival candidates Lorene Mahoney and Kevin Rebeck on September 7, 2008. Maloway made the Disraeli bridge his main issue in the 2008 federal election, and was elected over former Winnipeg Jets player Thomas Steen, who had been recruited as a star candidate by the Conservatives. The Conservatives won a minority government nationally, and Maloway was appointed as the NDP Critic for Science and Technology.

Maloway introduced a Private Member's Bill known as the "Airline Passenger's Bill of Rights" in February 2009. The bill would require airlines to include hidden fees and taxes in their advertised ticket prices, reimburse passengers who are bumped from overbooked flights by up to $1,200, and provide compensation for passengers who are left stranded on airport tarmacs for long periods of time. It has won the support of consumer advocacy groups, and Maloway has said that it will force airlines to act more responsibly. The National Airlines Council of Canada has opposed the measure, and has said that it will strengthen protection for travelers under an existing federal initiative. Maloway's bill narrowly passed second reading in the House of Commons in May 2009. On May 29, 2009, Maloway wrote a guest editorial defending the bill in the National Post newspaper.

Maloway has spoken against proposed free trade deals between Canada and the governments of Peru and Colombia.

Maloway was defeated by Conservative candidate Lawrence Toet in the 2011 federal election.

== Return to provincial politics ==
Following his defeat in the federal election, Maloway was nominated by the Manitoba NDP in his former seat of Elmwood, to succeed the retiring Bill Blaikie, and is the party's candidate in the October 4, 2011 provincial election. He was re-elected in the 2016, 2019 and 2023 provincial elections.

== Electoral record ==
2023 Manitoba general election: Elmwood
Party	Candidate	Votes	%	±%	Expenditures
New Democratic	Jim Maloway	4,933	62.21	+13.53	$20,119.73
Progressive Conservative	Joshua Okello	2,188	27.59	-4.23	$18,511.55
Liberal	Donovan Debattista	452	5.70	-3.65	$1,435.88
Green	Nicolas Geddert	304	3.83	-5.75	$568.45
Communist	German Lombana	52	0.66	+0.09	$106.40
Total valid votes/expense limit		7,929	99.10	–	$63,324.00
Total rejected and declined ballots		72	0.90	–	
Turnout		8,001	49.32	-0.90	
Eligible voters		16,221			
New Democratic hold		Swing		+8.88	
Source(s) Source: Elections Manitoba

2019 Manitoba general election: Elmwood
Party	Candidate	Votes	%	±%	Expenditures
New Democratic	Jim Maloway	3,886	48.68	2.34	$21,807.88
Progressive Conservative	Mayra Dubon	2,540	31.82	-12.87	$10,984.79
Green	Nicolas Geddert	765	9.58	–	$0.00
Liberal	Regan Wolfrom	746	9.35	–	$694.83
Communist	German Lombana	45	0.56	–	$310.80
Total valid votes		7,982	–	–	
Rejected		49	–		
Eligible voters / turnout		15,990	50.23	-4.76	
Source(s) Source: Manitoba. Chief Electoral Officer (2019). Statement of Votes for the 42nd Provincial General Election, September 10, 2019 (PDF) (Report). Winnipeg: Elections Manitoba. "Candidate Election Returns". Elections Manitoba. Elections Manitoba.

2016 Manitoba general election: Elmwood
Party	Candidate	Votes	%	±%	Expenditures
New Democratic	Jim Maloway	2,993	46.35	-8.26	$29,589.01
Progressive Conservative	Sarah Langevin	2,886	44.69	10.79	$6,843.54
Manitoba	Albert Ratt	579	8.97	–	$619.01
Total valid votes		6,458	–	–	
Rejected		234	–		
Eligible voters / turnout		12,171	54.98	2.43	
Source(s) Source: Manitoba. Chief Electoral Officer (2016). Statement of Votes for the 41st Provincial General Election, April 19, 2016 (PDF) (Report). Winnipeg: Elections Manitoba. "Election Returns: 41st General Election". Elections Manitoba. 2016.

2011 Manitoba general election: Elmwood
Party	Candidate	Votes	%	±%	Expenditures
New Democratic	Jim Maloway	3,864	54.61	0.85	$29,133.44
Progressive Conservative	David Hutten	2,399	33.90	12.79	$21,896.70
Liberal	Anthony Dratowany	467	6.60	-13.68	$4,024.51
Green	Ray Eskritt	346	4.89	0.03	$84.00
Total valid votes		7,076	–	–	
Rejected		60	–		
Eligible voters / turnout		13,578	52.56	16.12	
Source(s) Source: Manitoba. Chief Electoral Officer (2011). Statement of Votes for the 40th Provincial General Election, October 4, 2011 (PDF) (Report). Winnipeg: Elections Manitoba. "Election Returns: 40th General Election". Elections Manitoba. 2011.

2011 Canadian federal election
Party	Candidate	Votes	%	±%	Expenditures Elmwood—Transcona
Conservative	Lawrence Toet	15,298	46.40	+5.66	
New Democratic	Jim Maloway	14,998	45.49	-0.28	
Liberal	Ilona Niemczyk	1,660	5.03	-1.60	
Green	Ellen Young	1,017	3.08	-2.78	
Total valid votes/Expense limit		32,973	100.00	-	
Total rejected ballots		112			
Turnout		33,085	–	–	

Source: Elections Canada

2008 Canadian federal election: Elmwood—Transcona
Party	Candidate	Votes	%	±%	Expenditures
New Democratic	Jim Maloway	14,355	45.77	−5.07	$73,584.88
Conservative	Thomas Steen	12,776	40.74	+8.61	$60,628.72
Liberal	Wes Penner	2,079	6.63	−5.68	$30,542.33
Green	Chris Hrynkow	1,839	5.86	+2.23	$847.16
Christian Heritage	Robert Scott	312	0.99	−0.09	$2,735.85
Total valid votes/expense limit		31,361	99.68	–	$77,369.61
Total rejected ballots		100	0.32	−0.08	
Turnout		31,461	54.04	−4.16	
Electors on the lists		58,216			
New Democratic hold		Swing		−6.84	

2007 Manitoba general election: Elmwood
Party	Candidate	Votes	%	±%	Expenditures
New Democratic	Jim Maloway	3,873	61.51	-4.42	$20,096.25
Progressive Conservative	Allister Carrington	1,323	21.01	0.52	$3,120.34
Liberal	David Love	1,101	17.48	5.01	$7,994.14
Total valid votes		6,297	–	–	
Rejected		61	–		
Eligible voters / turnout		12,721	49.98	2.00	
Source(s) Source: Manitoba. Chief Electoral Officer (2007). Statement of Votes for the 39th Provincial General Election, May 22, 2007 (PDF) (Report). Winnipeg: Elections Manitoba.

2003 Manitoba general election: Elmwood
Party	Candidate	Votes	%	±%	Expenditures
New Democratic	Jim Maloway	3,954	65.92	3.06	$12,707.20
Progressive Conservative	Bryan McLeod	1,229	20.49	-11.80	$255.88
Liberal	Walt Roberts	748	12.47	–	$4,273.99
Libertarian	Gavin Whittaker	67	1.12	-2.77	$0.00
Total valid votes		5,998	–	–	
Rejected		45	–		
Eligible voters / turnout		12,596	47.98	-16.26	
Source(s) Source: Manitoba. Chief Electoral Officer (2003). Statement of Votes for the 38th Provincial General Election, June 3, 2003 (PDF) (Report). Winnipeg: Elections Manitoba.

1999 Manitoba general election: Elmwood
Party	Candidate	Votes	%	±%	Expenditures
New Democratic	Jim Maloway	5,176	62.86	9.85	$14,719.27
Progressive Conservative	Elsie Bordynuik	2,659	32.29	0.56	$18,447.73
Libertarian	Cameron Neumann	320	3.89	–	$0.00
Communist	James Hogaboam	79	0.96	–	$0.00
Total valid votes		8,234	–	–	
Rejected		97	–		
Eligible voters / turnout		12,969	64.24	-4.61	
Source(s) Source: Manitoba. Chief Electoral Officer (1999). Statement of Votes for the 37th Provincial General Election, September 21, 1999 (PDF) (Report). Winnipeg: Elections Manitoba.

1995 Manitoba general election: Elmwood
Party	Candidate	Votes	%	±%	Expenditures
New Democratic	Jim Maloway	4,264	53.02	6.04	$20,408.00
Progressive Conservative	Clayton McMurren	2,552	31.73	-2.82	$17,550.20
Liberal	John Petryshyn	1,227	15.26	-3.22	$9,465.92
Total valid votes		8,043	–	–	
Rejected		36	–		
Eligible voters / turnout		11,735	68.85	-2.79	
Source(s) Source: Manitoba. Chief Electoral Officer (1999). Statement of Votes for the 37th Provincial General Election, September 21, 1999 (PDF) (Report). Winnipeg: Elections Manitoba.

1990 Manitoba general election: Elmwood
Party	Candidate	Votes	%	±%
New Democratic	Jim Maloway	4,127	46.98	8.77
Progressive Conservative	Vic Toews	3,035	34.55	10.19
Liberal	Ed Price	1,623	18.47	-17.53
Total valid votes		8,785	–	–
Rejected		35	–	
Eligible voters / turnout		12,313	71.63	3.65
Source(s) Source: Manitoba. Chief Electoral Officer (1999). Statement of Votes for the 37th Provincial General Election, September 21, 1999 (PDF) (Report). Winnipeg: Elections Manitoba.

1988 Manitoba general election: Elmwood
Party	Candidate	Votes	%	±%
New Democratic	Jim Maloway	3,012	38.20	-7.63
Liberal	Ed Price	2,839	36.01	30.51
Progressive Conservative	J. Frank Syms	1,920	24.35	4.06
Libertarian	Russ Letkeman	113	1.43	–
Total valid votes		7,884	–	–
Rejected		30	–	
Eligible voters / turnout		11,641	67.98	3.65
New Democratic hold		Swing		-19.08
Source(s) Source: Manitoba. Chief Electoral Officer (1999). Statement of Votes for the 37th Provincial General Election, September 21, 1999 (PDF) (Report). Winnipeg: Elections Manitoba.

1986 Manitoba general election: Elmwood
Party	Candidate	Votes	%	±%
New Democratic	Jim Maloway	3,241	45.84	-21.99
Independent	Russell Doern	2,006	28.37	–
Progressive Conservative	Ray Brunka	1,435	20.29	-4.91
Liberal	Gilbert Benoit	389	5.50	0.92
Total valid votes		7,071	–	–
Rejected		34	–	
Eligible voters / Turnout		11,044	64.33	-1.84
New Democratic hold		Swing		
Source(s) Source: Manitoba. Chief Electoral Officer (1999). Statement of Votes for the 37th Provincial General Election, September 21, 1999 (PDF) (Report). Winnipeg: Elections Manitoba.

1983 Winnipeg municipal election: Councillor, Stevenson Ward
Party	Candidate	Votes	%
Independent	(x)Bob Douglas	5,734	87.85
NDP	Jim Maloway	793	12.15
Total valid votes		6,527	100.00

1974 Winnipeg municipal election: Councillor, Memorial Ward
Party	Candidate	Votes	%
Independent Citizens' Election Committee	(x)Robert Wilson	1,431	68.80
NDP	Jim Maloway	649	31.20
Total valid votes		2,080	100.00

Note: All provincial electoral information is taken from Elections Manitoba. Municipal results are taken from the Winnipeg Free Press newspaper, 24 October 1974 and 27 October 1983. The final official results were not significantly different.
