= Harry Mewhirter =

Canadian politician

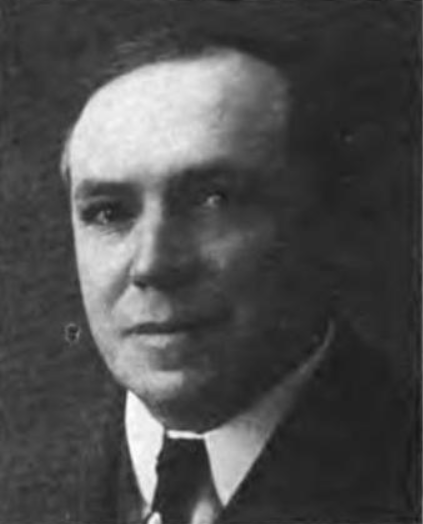

Member of the Legislative Assembly of Manitoba
- In office 1914–1915

Personal details
- Born: Harry Don Mewhirter; July 30, 1874 Sugar Grove, Illinois, United States
- Died: September 2, 1957 (aged 83) Elkton, Maryland, United States
- Party: Conservative
- Education: Drake University
- Occupation: Pharmacist, politician

Harry Don Mewhirter (July 30, 1874 – September 2, 1957) was a politician in Manitoba, Canada. He served in the Legislative Assembly of Manitoba from 1914 to 1915 as a member of the Conservative Party.

== Biography ==
Mewhirter was born in Sugar Grove, Illinois, USA, the son of Robert Mewhirter, and was educated in New Providence and at Drake University in Des Moines, Iowa. He graduated in pharmacy and chemistry, and moved to Canada in 1906. He became manager of the Gutta Percha and Rubber Co., Ltd. in Winnipeg, and resided in Dugald. In religion, Mewhirter was a Presbyterian.

He was married three times: first to Nancy during the 1890s, then to Mary Moe in 1897, and later to Alma.

He was elected to the Manitoba legislature in the 1914 provincial election, defeating Liberal Thomas Glendenning Hamilton by 364 votes in the Elmwood constituency. The Conservatives won this election, and Mewhirter sat as a backbench supporter of Rodmond Roblin's government.

In 1915, the Conservatives were forced to resign from office because a report commissioned by the Lieutenant Governor found the government guilty of corruption in the tendering of contracts for new legislative buildings. A new election was called, which the Liberals won in a landslide. Mewhirter was not a candidate.

Harry Mewhirter died in Elkton, Maryland on September 2, 1957.
