= Leila Dance =

Canadian politician (born 1978)

Member of Parliament for Elmwood—Transcona
- In office September 17, 2024 – April 28, 2025
- Preceded by: Daniel Blaikie
- Succeeded by: Colin Reynolds

Personal details
- Born: 1977 or 1978 (age 48–49) Winnipeg, Manitoba, Canada
- Party: New Democratic
- Children: 1

Leila Dance (born 1977 or 1978) is a Canadian politician who served as a member of Parliament (MP) representing the riding of Elmwood—Transcona from 2024 to 2025. A member of the New Democratic Party (NDP), she was first elected to the House of Commons in the 2024 by-election.

== Political career ==
Dance was elected seat in the 2024 Elmwood—Transcona federal by-election and won with 48% of the vote. Dance succeeded outgoing MP Daniel Blaikie, who stepped down to take a position working for the Manitoba government under the leadership of NDP Premier Wab Kinew.

Prior to her election, Dance was executive director of the Transcona Business Improvement Zone, a position she had for four years. Previously, she had worked for more than 16 years in the charitable sector for agencies such as the ALS Society of Manitoba, the Children's Wish Foundation, the Park City West Community Centre, and the Kidney Foundation.

Dance was defeated in the 2025 Canadian federal election by the Conservative candidate Colin Reynolds, who lost the previous 2024 by-election against her.

Dance endorsed Alberta MP Heather McPherson in the 2026 New Democratic Party leadership election.

== Electoral record ==
2025 Canadian federal election: Elmwood—Transcona
** Preliminary results — Not yet official **
Party	Candidate	Votes	%	±%	Expenditures
Conservative	Colin Reynolds	19,463	41.60	+13.15	
New Democratic	Leila Dance	16,138	34.49	–14.63	
Liberal	Ian MacIntyre	10,469	22.38	+7.50	
People's	Collin Watson	396	0.85	–5.10	
Green	Nicolas Geddert	314	0.69	–0.90	
Total valid votes/expense limit					
Total rejected ballots					
Turnout		46,787	65.42		
Eligible voters		71,516			
Conservative notional gain from New Democratic		Swing		+13.89	
Source: Elections Canada

Canadian federal by-election, September 16, 2024: Elmwood—Transcona Resignation of Daniel Blaikie
Party	Candidate	Votes	%	±%
New Democratic	Leila Dance	13,597	48.18	-1.51
Conservative	Colin Reynolds	12,415	44.00	+15.87
Liberal	Ian MacIntyre	1,362	4.83	-9.92
Green	Nicolas Geddert	360	1.28	-0.34
People's	Sarah Couture	353	1.25	-4.57
Canadian Future	Zbig Strycharz	132	0.47	—
Total valid votes		28,219	99.62	
Total rejected ballots		107	0.38	
Turnout		28,326	39.16	-20.46
Eligible voters		72,325		
New Democratic hold		Swing		-8.73
Source: Elections Canada
