= Elmwood (electoral district) =

Provincial electoral district in Manitoba, Canada

Coordinates: 49.915°N 97.109°W

Manitoba electoral district
- Boundaries for Elmwood (2019–present) highlighted in red

Provincial electoral district
- Legislature: Legislative Assembly of Manitoba
MLA
Jim Maloway
New Democratic
- District created: 1957
- First contested: 1958
- Last contested: 2023

Demographics
- Census division: Winnipeg

Elmwood is a provincial electoral district of Manitoba, Canada.

== History ==
=== 1914–1920 ===
The original Elmwood riding existed from 1914 to 1920, in what was then a suburban community in the north of Winnipeg. It was created out of Springfield, Kildonan-St. Andrews, Winnipeg North, and St. Boniface. It was abolished into Springfield, Winnipeg and St. Boniface.

Its provincial Members of the Legislative Assembly (MLAs) were:

Parliament	Years	Member	Party
14th	1914–1915	Harry Mewhirter	Conservative
15th	1915–1920	Thomas Hamilton	Liberal

=== 1958–present ===
The modern Elmwood riding was created by redistribution in 1957, and has formally existed since the provincial election of 1958. It is located in the northeastern section of the amalgamated city of Winnipeg; the Red River forms its western and part of its southern boundary. The Elmwood riding existing from 1958 to 1969 was confined to the actual Elmwood area of the city of Winnipeg. In the redistribution in advance of the 1969 Manitoba general election, part of East Kildonan was added. Since 1981, the Elmwood riding has moved further north into East Kildonan, taking in much of the old Kildonan riding (existing between 1958 and 1981) while the eastern part of the Elmwood area has been removed and added to the Concordia riding created in 1981.

Elmwood is mostly working class and industrial. According to the 1999 Canadian census, manufacturing accounted for 18% of all industry in the riding. Thirty-one per cent of the riding's residents are listed as low-income. The average family income in Elmwood was $41,842, and the unemployment rate was 9.40%.

The riding has a significant immigrant population, including 9% of German background and 8% of Ukrainian background. Eighteen per cent of the riding's residents were over age 65.

The New Democratic Party of Manitoba (and its predecessor, the Manitoba Co-operative Commonwealth Federation) have won Elmwood in every provincial election since the riding's re-creation. In the 1988 general election, when the NDP fell from majority government to third-party status, Elmwood, along with adjoining Concordia, Logan, and St. Johns were the only four constituencies in Winnipeg to elect NDP MLAs.

== Members of the Legislative Assembly ==
Parliament	Years	Member	Party
Riding created from Winnipeg North and Kildonan-Transcona
25th	1958–1959	Steve Peters	Co-operative Commonwealth
26th	1959–1961	Steve Peters	Co-operative Commonwealth
26th	1961–1962	Steve Peters	New Democratic
27th	1962–1966	Steve Peters	New Democratic
28th	1966–1969	Russell Doern	New Democratic
29th	1969–1973	Russell Doern	New Democratic
30th	1973–1977	Russell Doern	New Democratic
31st	1977–1981	Russell Doern	New Democratic
32nd	1981–1984	Russell Doern	New Democratic
32nd	1984–1986	Russell Doern	Independent
33rd	1986–1988	Jim Maloway	New Democratic
34th	1988–1990	Jim Maloway	New Democratic
35th	1990–1995	Jim Maloway	New Democratic
36th	1995–1999	Jim Maloway	New Democratic
37th	1999–2003	Jim Maloway	New Democratic
38th	2003–2007	Jim Maloway	New Democratic
39th	2007–2008	Jim Maloway	New Democratic
39th	2008–2011	Bill Blaikie	New Democratic
40th	2011–2016	Jim Maloway	New Democratic
41st	2016–2019	Jim Maloway	New Democratic
42nd	2019–2023	Jim Maloway	New Democratic
43rd	2023–present	Jim Maloway	New Democratic

== Election results ==
=== 1914 ===
1914 Manitoba general election
Party	Candidate	Votes	%
Conservative	Harry Mewhirter	1,901	48.18
Liberal	Thomas Glendenning Hamilton	1,537	38.95
Labour	Robert Sinclair Ward	508	12.87
Total valid votes		3,946	–
Rejected		N/A	–
Eligible voters / Turnout		4,818	81.90
Source(s) Source: Manitoba. Chief Electoral Officer (1999). Statement of Votes for the 37th Provincial General Election, September 21, 1999 (PDF) (Report). Winnipeg: Elections Manitoba.

=== 1915 ===
1915 Manitoba general election
Party	Candidate	Votes	%	±%
Liberal	Thomas Glendenning Hamilton	2,319	72.81	33.86
Conservative	Donald Munro	866	27.19	-20.99
Total valid votes		3,185	–	–
Rejected		N/A	–	
Eligible voters / Turnout		4,463	71.36	-10.54
Source(s) Source: Manitoba. Chief Electoral Officer (1999). Statement of Votes for the 37th Provincial General Election, September 21, 1999 (PDF) (Report). Winnipeg: Elections Manitoba.

=== 1958 ===
1958 Manitoba general election
Party	Candidate	Votes	%	±%
Co-operative Commonwealth	Steve Peters	2,375	41.91	–
Liberal–Progressive	Alexander Turk	1,519	26.80	–
Progressive Conservative	Joseph Stepnuk	1,084	19.13	–
Independent Conservative	Michael "Mike" Baryluk	689	12.16	–
Total valid votes		5,667	–	–
Rejected		48	–	
Eligible voters / Turnout		11,980	47.70	-23.66
Source(s) Source: Manitoba. Chief Electoral Officer (1999). Statement of Votes for the 37th Provincial General Election, September 21, 1999 (PDF) (Report). Winnipeg: Elections Manitoba.

=== 1959 ===
1959 Manitoba general election
Party	Candidate	Votes	%	±%
Co-operative Commonwealth	Steve Peters	2,782	40.73	-1.18
Progressive Conservative	Henry Emerson Snyder	2,560	37.48	18.35
Liberal–Progressive	Alexander Turk	1,488	21.79	-5.02
Total valid votes		6,830	–	–
Rejected		64	–	
Eligible voters / Turnout		11,745	58.70	10.99
Source(s) Source: Manitoba. Chief Electoral Officer (1999). Statement of Votes for the 37th Provincial General Election, September 21, 1999 (PDF) (Report). Winnipeg: Elections Manitoba.

=== 1962 ===
1962 Manitoba general election
Party	Candidate	Votes	%	±%
New Democratic	Steve Peters	2,024	36.30	34.43
Liberal	John Michael "Big John" Kozoriz	1,815	32.55	10.76
Progressive Conservative	Donald C. Thompson	1,737	31.15	-6.33
Total valid votes		5,576	–	–
Rejected		53	–	
Eligible voters / Turnout		11,846	47.52	-11.18
Source(s) Source: Manitoba. Chief Electoral Officer (1999). Statement of Votes for the 37th Provincial General Election, September 21, 1999 (PDF) (Report). Winnipeg: Elections Manitoba.

=== 1966 ===
1966 Manitoba general election
Party	Candidate	Votes	%	±%
New Democratic	Russell Doern	2,765	40.76	4.47
Progressive Conservative	Tom Snowdon	1,816	26.77	-4.38
Liberal	John Michael "Big John" Kozoriz	1,458	21.49	-11.06
Social Credit	Walter Bowden	744	10.97	–
Total valid votes		6,783	–	–
Rejected		88	–	
Eligible voters / Turnout		12,201	56.32	8.80
Source(s) Source: Manitoba. Chief Electoral Officer (1999). Statement of Votes for the 37th Provincial General Election, September 21, 1999 (PDF) (Report). Winnipeg: Elections Manitoba.

=== 1969 ===
1969 Manitoba general election
Party	Candidate	Votes	%	±%
New Democratic	Russell Doern	3,803	59.59	18.83
Progressive Conservative	Alan George Gardiner	1,526	23.91	-2.86
Liberal	John Michael "Big John" Kozoriz	1,053	16.50	-5.00
Total valid votes		6,382	–	–
Rejected		35	–	
Eligible voters / Turnout		10,541	60.88	4.56
Source(s) Source: Manitoba. Chief Electoral Officer (1999). Statement of Votes for the 37th Provincial General Election, September 21, 1999 (PDF) (Report). Winnipeg: Elections Manitoba.

=== 1973 ===
1973 Manitoba general election
Party	Candidate	Votes	%	±%
New Democratic	Russell Doern	4,987	57.25	-2.34
Progressive Conservative	Edward Tymchuk	2,361	27.10	3.19
Liberal	Ray Brunka	1,363	15.65	-0.85
Total valid votes		8,711	–	–
Rejected		21	–	
Eligible voters / Turnout		11,421	76.46	15.58
Source(s) Source: Manitoba. Chief Electoral Officer (1999). Statement of Votes for the 37th Provincial General Election, September 21, 1999 (PDF) (Report). Winnipeg: Elections Manitoba.

=== 1977 ===
1977 Manitoba general election
Party	Candidate	Votes	%	±%
New Democratic	Russell Doern	4,136	51.11	-6.14
Progressive Conservative	Ken Gunn-Walberg	3,282	40.55	13.45
Liberal	Ken Vincent	675	8.34	-7.31
Total valid votes		8,093	–	–
Rejected		6	–	
Eligible voters / Turnout		11,195	72.34	-4.11
Source(s) Source: Manitoba. Chief Electoral Officer (1999). Statement of Votes for the 37th Provincial General Election, September 21, 1999 (PDF) (Report). Winnipeg: Elections Manitoba.

=== 1981 ===
1981 Manitoba general election
Party	Candidate	Votes	%	±%
New Democratic	Russell Doern	5,140	67.83	16.72
Progressive Conservative	Eveline Holtmann	1,910	25.20	-15.35
Liberal	Eric Wood	347	4.58	-3.76
Progressive	Curtis Bloodworth	181	2.39	–
Total valid votes		7,578	–	–
Rejected		36	–	
Eligible voters / Turnout		11,506	66.17	-6.17
Source(s) Source: Manitoba. Chief Electoral Officer (1999). Statement of Votes for the 37th Provincial General Election, September 21, 1999 (PDF) (Report). Winnipeg: Elections Manitoba.

=== 1986 ===
1986 Manitoba general election
Party	Candidate	Votes	%	±%
New Democratic	Jim Maloway	3,241	45.84	-21.99
Independent	Russell Doern	2,006	28.37	–
Progressive Conservative	Ray Brunka	1,435	20.29	-4.91
Liberal	Gilbert Benoit	389	5.50	0.92
Total valid votes		7,071	–	–
Rejected		34	–	
Eligible voters / Turnout		11,044	64.33	-1.84
New Democratic hold		Swing		
Source(s) Source: Manitoba. Chief Electoral Officer (1999). Statement of Votes for the 37th Provincial General Election, September 21, 1999 (PDF) (Report). Winnipeg: Elections Manitoba.

=== 1988 ===
1988 Manitoba general election
Party	Candidate	Votes	%	±%
New Democratic	Jim Maloway	3,012	38.20	-7.63
Liberal	Ed Price	2,839	36.01	30.51
Progressive Conservative	J. Frank Syms	1,920	24.35	4.06
Libertarian	Russ Letkeman	113	1.43	–
Total valid votes		7,884	–	–
Rejected		30	–	
Eligible voters / turnout		11,641	67.98	3.65
New Democratic hold		Swing		-19.08
Source(s) Source: Manitoba. Chief Electoral Officer (1999). Statement of Votes for the 37th Provincial General Election, September 21, 1999 (PDF) (Report). Winnipeg: Elections Manitoba.

=== 1990 ===
1990 Manitoba general election
Party	Candidate	Votes	%	±%
New Democratic	Jim Maloway	4,127	46.98	8.77
Progressive Conservative	Vic Toews	3,035	34.55	10.19
Liberal	Ed Price	1,623	18.47	-17.53
Total valid votes		8,785	–	–
Rejected		35	–	
Eligible voters / turnout		12,313	71.63	3.65
Source(s) Source: Manitoba. Chief Electoral Officer (1999). Statement of Votes for the 37th Provincial General Election, September 21, 1999 (PDF) (Report). Winnipeg: Elections Manitoba.

=== 1995 ===
1995 Manitoba general election
Party	Candidate	Votes	%	±%	Expenditures
New Democratic	Jim Maloway	4,264	53.02	6.04	$20,408.00
Progressive Conservative	Clayton McMurren	2,552	31.73	-2.82	$17,550.20
Liberal	John Petryshyn	1,227	15.26	-3.22	$9,465.92
Total valid votes		8,043	–	–	
Rejected		36	–		
Eligible voters / turnout		11,735	68.85	-2.79	
Source(s) Source: Manitoba. Chief Electoral Officer (1999). Statement of Votes for the 37th Provincial General Election, September 21, 1999 (PDF) (Report). Winnipeg: Elections Manitoba.

=== 1999 ===
1999 Manitoba general election
Party	Candidate	Votes	%	±%	Expenditures
New Democratic	Jim Maloway	5,176	62.86	9.85	$14,719.27
Progressive Conservative	Elsie Bordynuik	2,659	32.29	0.56	$18,447.73
Libertarian	Cameron Neumann	320	3.89	–	$0.00
Communist	James Hogaboam	79	0.96	–	$0.00
Total valid votes		8,234	–	–	
Rejected		97	–		
Eligible voters / turnout		12,969	64.24	-4.61	
Source(s) Source: Manitoba. Chief Electoral Officer (1999). Statement of Votes for the 37th Provincial General Election, September 21, 1999 (PDF) (Report). Winnipeg: Elections Manitoba.

=== 2003 ===
2003 Manitoba general election
Party	Candidate	Votes	%	±%	Expenditures
New Democratic	Jim Maloway	3,954	65.92	3.06	$12,707.20
Progressive Conservative	Bryan McLeod	1,229	20.49	-11.80	$255.88
Liberal	Walt Roberts	748	12.47	–	$4,273.99
Libertarian	Gavin Whittaker	67	1.12	-2.77	$0.00
Total valid votes		5,998	–	–	
Rejected		45	–		
Eligible voters / turnout		12,596	47.98	-16.26	
Source(s) Source: Manitoba. Chief Electoral Officer (2003). Statement of Votes for the 38th Provincial General Election, June 3, 2003 (PDF) (Report). Winnipeg: Elections Manitoba.

=== 2007 ===
2007 Manitoba general election
Party	Candidate	Votes	%	±%	Expenditures
New Democratic	Jim Maloway	3,873	61.51	-4.42	$20,096.25
Progressive Conservative	Allister Carrington	1,323	21.01	0.52	$3,120.34
Liberal	David Love	1,101	17.48	5.01	$7,994.14
Total valid votes		6,297	–	–	
Rejected		61	–		
Eligible voters / turnout		12,721	49.98	2.00	
Source(s) Source: Manitoba. Chief Electoral Officer (2007). Statement of Votes for the 39th Provincial General Election, May 22, 2007 (PDF) (Report). Winnipeg: Elections Manitoba.

=== 2009 by-election ===
Manitoba provincial by-election, March 24, 2009 Resignation of Jim Maloway
Party	Candidate	Votes	%	±%	Expenditures
New Democratic	Bill Blaikie	2,325	53.76	-7.75	$17,603.25
Progressive Conservative	Adrian Schulz	913	21.11	0.10	$15,919.78
Liberal	Regan Wolfrom	877	20.28	2.79	$27,106.33
Green	James R. Beddome	210	4.86	–	$1,115.73
Total valid votes		4,325	–	–	
Rejected		14	–		
Eligible voters / turnout		11,907	36.44	−13.54	
Source(s) Source:

=== 2011 ===
2011 Manitoba general election
Party	Candidate	Votes	%	±%	Expenditures
New Democratic	Jim Maloway	3,864	54.61	0.85	$29,133.44
Progressive Conservative	David Hutten	2,399	33.90	12.79	$21,896.70
Liberal	Anthony Dratowany	467	6.60	-13.68	$4,024.51
Green	Ray Eskritt	346	4.89	0.03	$84.00
Total valid votes		7,076	–	–	
Rejected		60	–		
Eligible voters / turnout		13,578	52.56	16.12	
Source(s) Source: Manitoba. Chief Electoral Officer (2011). Statement of Votes for the 40th Provincial General Election, October 4, 2011 (PDF) (Report). Winnipeg: Elections Manitoba. "Election Returns: 40th General Election". Elections Manitoba. 2011.

=== 2016 ===
2016 Manitoba general election
Party	Candidate	Votes	%	±%	Expenditures
New Democratic	Jim Maloway	2,993	46.35	-8.26	$29,589.01
Progressive Conservative	Sarah Langevin	2,886	44.69	10.79	$6,843.54
Manitoba	Albert Ratt	579	8.97	–	$619.01
Total valid votes		6,458	–	–	
Rejected		234	–		
Eligible voters / turnout		12,171	54.98	2.43	
Source(s) Source: Manitoba. Chief Electoral Officer (2016). Statement of Votes for the 41st Provincial General Election, April 19, 2016 (PDF) (Report). Winnipeg: Elections Manitoba. "Election Returns: 41st General Election". Elections Manitoba. 2016.

=== 2019 ===
2019 Manitoba general election
Party	Candidate	Votes	%	±%	Expenditures
New Democratic	Jim Maloway	3,886	48.68	2.34	$21,807.88
Progressive Conservative	Mayra Dubon	2,540	31.82	-12.87	$10,984.79
Green	Nicolas Geddert	765	9.58	–	$0.00
Liberal	Regan Wolfrom	746	9.35	–	$694.83
Communist	German Lombana	45	0.56	–	$310.80
Total valid votes		7,982	–	–	
Rejected		49	–		
Eligible voters / turnout		15,990	50.23	-4.76	
Source(s) Source: Manitoba. Chief Electoral Officer (2019). Statement of Votes for the 42nd Provincial General Election, September 10, 2019 (PDF) (Report). Winnipeg: Elections Manitoba. "Candidate Election Returns". Elections Manitoba. Elections Manitoba.

=== 2023 ===
2023 Manitoba general election
Party	Candidate	Votes	%	±%	Expenditures
New Democratic	Jim Maloway	4,933	62.21	+13.53	$20,119.73
Progressive Conservative	Joshua Okello	2,188	27.59	-4.23	$18,511.55
Liberal	Donovan Debattista	452	5.70	-3.65	$1,435.88
Green	Nicolas Geddert	304	3.83	-5.75	$568.45
Communist	German Lombana	52	0.66	+0.09	$106.40
Total valid votes/expense limit		7,929	99.10	–	$63,324.00
Total rejected and declined ballots		72	0.90	–	
Turnout		8,001	49.32	-0.90	
Eligible voters		16,221			
New Democratic hold		Swing		+8.88	
Source(s) Source: Elections Manitoba

== Previous boundaries ==
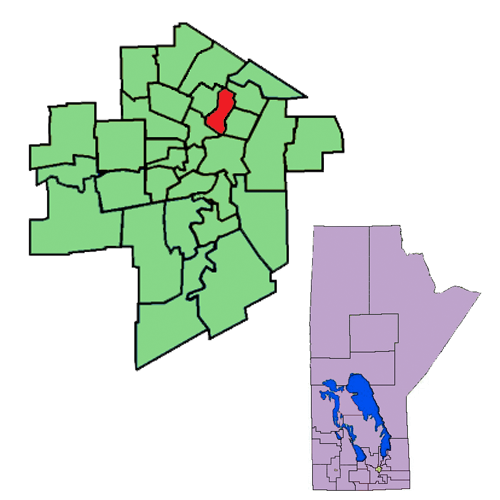
The 1998–2011 boundaries for Elmwood highlighted in red.

== See also ==
- List of Manitoba provincial electoral districts
- Canadian provincial electoral districts
