= Elmwood—Transcona =

Federal electoral district in Manitoba, Canada

Coordinates: 49.9186°N 97.0313°W

Manitoba electoral district
- Interactive map of riding boundaries from the 2025 federal election

Federal electoral district
- Legislature: House of Commons
MP
Colin Reynolds
Conservative
- District created: 1987
- First contested: 1988
- Last contested: 2025
- District webpage: profile, map

Demographics
- Population (2021): 101,691
- Electors (2015): 64,395
- Area (km²): 50
- Pop. density (per km²): 2,033.8
- Census division: Division No. 11
- Census subdivision(s): Winnipeg (part), Springfield (part)

Elmwood—Transcona (formerly Winnipeg—Transcona) is a federal electoral district in Manitoba, Canada, that has been represented in the House of Commons of Canada since 1988. Its population in 2021 was 101,691.

== History ==
The riding was created in 1987 from Winnipeg North Centre and Winnipeg—Birds Hill ridings.

It was previously named Winnipeg—Transcona from 1987 to 2003.

The riding gained territory from Kildonan—St. Paul and a fraction from Saint Boniface during the 2012 electoral redistribution.

Following the 2022 Canadian federal electoral redistribution, the riding lost the area north of Leighton Avenue and west of Raleigh Street to Kildonan—St. Paul and gained the Navin, Norcan and Dugald areas from Provencher,

== Geography ==
Elmwood–Transcona is located in the northeastern corner of Winnipeg, covering the East Kildonan, Elmwood, Transcona and part of the North Kildonan sections of the city. It covers the neighbourhoods of Chalmers, Eaglemere, East Elmwood, Glenelm, Grassie, Kern Park, Canterbury Park, Kildonan Crossing, Meadows, Munroe East, Munroe West, Peguis, Raidisson, Regent, Rossmere, Transcona South, Mission Gardens, Melrose, Kildare-Redonda, Kildonan Drive, Talbot-Grey, Transcona Yards, Tyne-Tees, Valley Gardens and Victoria West. It covers 50 km^{2}.

In the 2019 and 2021 elections, the NDP have been stronger in the western, more urban part of the riding, especially in Elmwood. Their best neighbourhood in both elections was Glenelm in the West Elmwood Area. The Conservatives saw their best results in the eastern, more suburban part of the riding. Their best neighbourhood in both elections was the Transcona South/Transcona Yards area.

== Demographics ==
As of the Canada 2021 Census

Languages: 75.4% English, 4.5% Tagalog, 4.2% Punjabi, 2.6% French, 1.5% German, 1.4% Spanish, 1.0% Ukrainian
Religions: 50.9% Christian (21.8% Catholic, 4.0% United Church, 2.4% Anglican, 2.4% Lutheran, 2.1% Pentecostal, 1.7% Christian Orthodox, 1.3% Anabaptist, 15.2% Other), 4.2% Sikh, 2.2% Muslim, 1.4% Hindu, 39.4% None
Median income: $40,800 (2020)
Average income: $46,120 (2020)

Racial groups in Elmwood—Transcona (2011−2021)
| Racial group | 2021 | | 2016 | | 2011 | |
| Racial group | Pop. | % | Pop. | % | Pop. | % |
|---|---|---|---|---|---|---|
| European (Note: Statistic includes all persons that did not make up part of a visible minority or an indigenous identity.) | 57,705 | 57.4% | 59,230 | 64.96% | 62,565 | 73.64% |
| Indigenous | 14,230 | 14.15% | 12,395 | 13.59% | 10,385 | 12.22% |
| Filipino | 8,655 | 8.61% | 6,765 | 7.42% | 3,725 | 4.38% |
| Southeast Asian | 1,470 | 1.46% | 1,030 | 1.13% | 1,065 | 1.25% |
| Black | 6,735 | 6.7% | 3,910 | 4.29% | 1,915 | 2.25% |
| South Asian | 6,425 | 6.39% | 3,850 | 4.22% | 1,800 | 2.12% |
| Latin American | 1,875 | 1.86% | 1,440 | 1.58% | 1,615 | 1.9% |
| Chinese | 1,035 | 1.03% | 990 | 1.09% | 865 | 1.02% |
| Korean | 115 | 0.11% | 170 | 0.19% | 100 | 0.12% |
| Japanese | 160 | 0.16% | 215 | 0.24% | 125 | 0.15% |
| Arab | 595 | 0.59% | 260 | 0.29% | 150 | 0.18% |
| West Asian | 250 | 0.25% | 220 | 0.24% | 195 | 0.23% |
| Other/multiracial (Note: Statistic includes total responses of "Visible minority, n.i.e." and "Multiple visible minorities" under visible minority section on census.) | 1,290 | 1.28% | 695 | 0.76% | 455 | 0.54% |
| Total responses | 100,540 | 98.87% | 91,185 | 98.33% | 84,960 | 98.9% |
| Total population | 101,691 | 100% | 92,738 | 100% | 85,906 | 100% |
Notes: Totals greater than 100% due to multiple origin responses. Demographics based on 2012 Canadian federal electoral redistribution riding boundaries.

== Riding associations ==
Riding associations are the local branches of political parties:

| Party | Association name | CEO | HQ address |
| Conservative | Elmwood–Transcona Conservative Association | Daniel Mulder | |
| Liberal | Elmwood–Transcona Federal Liberal Association | David Engel | |
| New Democratic | Elmwood–Transcona Federal NDP Riding Association | Michelle Scebenski | |

== Members of Parliament ==
| Parliament | Years | Member | Party |
|---|---|---|---|
Winnipeg—Transcona; Riding created from Winnipeg North Centre and Winnipeg—Birds Hill
| 34th | 1988–1993 | Bill Blaikie | New Democratic |
| 35th | 1993–1997 | Bill Blaikie | New Democratic |
| 36th | 1997–2000 | Bill Blaikie | New Democratic |
| 37th | 2000–2004 | Bill Blaikie | New Democratic |
Elmwood—Transcona
| 38th | 2004–2006 | Bill Blaikie | New Democratic |
| 39th | 2006–2008 | Bill Blaikie | New Democratic |
| 40th | 2008–2011 | Jim Maloway | New Democratic |
| 41st | 2011–2015 | Lawrence Toet | Conservative |
| 42nd | 2015–2019 | Daniel Blaikie | New Democratic |
| 43rd | 2019–2021 | Daniel Blaikie | New Democratic |
| 44th | 2021–2024 | Daniel Blaikie | New Democratic |
| 44th | 2024–2025 | Leila Dance | New Democratic |
| 45th | 2025–present | Colin Reynolds | Conservative |

== Election results ==
View source data.
Graph of election results in Elmwood—Transcona (minor parties that never got 2% of the vote or didn't run consistently are omitted)

=== Elmwood—Transcona, 2025–present ===
2025 Canadian federal election
** Preliminary results — Not yet official **
| Party | Candidate | Votes | % | ±% | Expenditures |
|---|---|---|---|---|---|
| Conservative | Colin Reynolds | 19,463 | 41.60 | +13.15 | |
| New Democratic | Leila Dance | 16,138 | 34.49 | –14.63 | |
| Liberal | Ian MacIntyre | 10,469 | 22.38 | +7.50 | |
| People's | Collin Watson | 396 | 0.85 | –5.10 | |
| Green | Nicolas Geddert | 314 | 0.69 | –0.90 | |
| Total valid votes/expense limit | | | | | |
| Total rejected ballots | | | | | |
| Turnout | | 46,787 | 65.42 | | |
| Eligible voters | | 71,516 | | | |
| Conservative notional gain from New Democratic | | Swing | | +13.89 | |
Source: Elections Canada

=== Elmwood—Transcona, 2015–2025 ===
Canadian federal by-election, September 16, 2024 Resignation of Daniel Blaikie
| Party | Candidate | Votes | % | ±% |
|---|---|---|---|---|
| New Democratic | Leila Dance | 13,597 | 48.18 | -1.51 |
| Conservative | Colin Reynolds | 12,415 | 44.00 | +15.87 |
| Liberal | Ian MacIntyre | 1,362 | 4.83 | -9.92 |
| Green | Nicolas Geddert | 360 | 1.28 | -0.34 |
| People's | Sarah Couture | 353 | 1.25 | -4.57 |
| Canadian Future | Zbig Strycharz | 132 | 0.47 | — |
| Total valid votes | | 28,219 | 99.62 | |
| Total rejected ballots | | 107 | 0.38 | |
| Turnout | | 28,326 | 39.16 | -20.46 |
| Eligible voters | | 72,325 | | |
| New Democratic hold | | Swing | | -8.73 |
Source: Elections Canada

2021 federal election redistributed results
| Party | Vote | % |
|---|---|---|
| New Democratic | 20,001 | 49.12 |
| Conservative | 11,585 | 28.45 |
| Liberal | 6,057 | 14.88 |
| People's | 2,423 | 5.95 |
| Green | 647 | 1.59 |
| Others | 5 | 0.01 |

2021 Canadian federal election
| Party | Candidate | Votes | % | ±% | Expenditures |
|---|---|---|---|---|---|
| New Democratic | Daniel Blaikie | 20,791 | 49.69 | +4.07 | $63,992.50 |
| Conservative | Rejeanne Caron | 11,768 | 28.13 | -9.32 | $53,284.18 |
| Liberal | Sara Mirwaldt | 6,169 | 14.74 | +2.42 | $10,073.29 |
| People's | Jamie Cumming | 2,435 | 5.82 | +4.64 | $276.86 |
| Green | Devlin Hinchey | 676 | 1.62 | -1.80 | $0.00 |
| Total valid votes/expense limit | | 41,839 | 99.26 | – | $106,782.98 |
| Total rejected ballots | | 314 | 0.74 | +0.03 | |
| Turnout | | 42,153 | 59.62 | -2.72 | |
| Eligible voters | | 70,701 | | | |
| New Democratic hold | | Swing | | +6.69 | |
Source: Elections Canada

2019 Canadian federal election
| Party | Candidate | Votes | % | ±% | Expenditures |
|---|---|---|---|---|---|
| New Democratic | Daniel Blaikie | 19,786 | 45.63 | +11.49 | $84,787.58 |
| Conservative | Lawrence Toet | 16,240 | 37.45 | +3.45 | $90,425.22 |
| Liberal | Jennifer Malabar | 5,346 | 12.33 | -17.18 | $35,581.50 |
| Green | Kelly Manweiler | 1,480 | 3.41 | +1.05 | none listed |
| People's | Noel Gautron | 512 | 1.18 | – | $2,119.25 |
| Total valid votes/expense limit | | 43,364 | 99.28 | | |
| Total rejected ballots | | 313 | 0.72 | +0.30 | |
| Turnout | | 43,677 | 62.34 | -3.26 | |
| Eligible voters | | 70,062 | | | |
| New Democratic hold | | Swing | | +4.02 | |
Source: Elections Canada

2015 Canadian federal election
| Party | Candidate | Votes | % | ±% | Expenditures |
|---|---|---|---|---|---|
| New Democratic | Daniel Blaikie | 14,709 | 34.14 | -10.67 | $109,753.17 |
| Conservative | Lawrence Toet | 14,648 | 34.00 | -12.92 | $127,718.93 |
| Liberal | Andrea Richardson-Lipon | 12,713 | 29.51 | +24.32 | $23,842.58 |
| Green | Kim Parke | 1,016 | 2.36 | -0.71 | – |
| Total valid votes/expense limit | | 43,086 | 99.58 | | $199,824.02 |
| Total rejected ballots | | 182 | 0.42 | – | |
| Turnout | | 43,268 | 66.60 | – | |
| Eligible voters | | 65,961 | | | |
| New Democratic gain from Conservative | | Swing | | +1.12 | |
Source: Elections Canada

2011 federal election redistributed results
| Party | Vote | % |
|---|---|---|
| Conservative | 16,086 | 46.91 |
| New Democratic | 15,364 | 44.81 |
| Liberal | 1,779 | 5.19 |
| Green | 1,053 | 3.07 |
| Others | 7 | 0.02 |

=== Elmwood—Transcona, 2004–2015 ===
2011 Canadian federal election
| Party | Candidate | Votes | % | ±% | Expenditures |
|---|---|---|---|---|---|
| Conservative | Lawrence Toet | 15,298 | 46.40 | +5.66 | – |
| New Democratic | Jim Maloway | 14,998 | 45.49 | -0.29 | – |
| Liberal | Ilona Niemczyk | 1,660 | 5.03 | -1.59 | – |
| Green | Ellen Young | 1,017 | 3.08 | -2.78 | – |
| Total valid votes/expense limit | | 32,973 | 99.66 | | – |
| Total rejected ballots | | 112 | 0.34 | +0.02 | |
| Turnout | | 33,085 | 55.93 | +1.89 | |
| Eligible voters | | 59,154 | – | – | |
| Conservative gain from New Democratic | | Swing | | +2.97 | |

Source: Elections Canada

2008 Canadian federal election
| Party | Candidate | Votes | % | ±% | Expenditures |
|---|---|---|---|---|---|
| New Democratic | Jim Maloway | 14,355 | 45.77 | −5.07 | $73,584.88 |
| Conservative | Thomas Steen | 12,776 | 40.74 | +8.61 | $60,628.72 |
| Liberal | Wes Penner | 2,079 | 6.63 | −5.68 | $30,542.33 |
| Green | Chris Hrynkow | 1,839 | 5.86 | +2.23 | $847.16 |
| Christian Heritage | Robert Scott | 312 | 0.99 | −0.09 | $2,735.85 |
| Total valid votes/expense limit | | 31,361 | 99.68 | – | $77,369.61 |
| Total rejected ballots | | 100 | 0.32 | −0.08 | |
| Turnout | | 31,461 | 54.04 | −4.16 | |
| Electors on the lists | | 58,216 | | | |
| New Democratic hold | | Swing | | −6.84 | |

2006 Canadian federal election
| Party | Candidate | Votes | % | ±% | Expenditures |
|---|---|---|---|---|---|
| New Democratic | Bill Blaikie | 16,967 | 50.85 | −1.14 | $40,314.57 |
| Conservative | Linda West | 10,720 | 32.13 | +6.02 | $68,007.66 |
| Liberal | Tanya Parks | 4,108 | 12.31 | −4.50 | $12,622.61 |
| Green | Tanja Hutter | 1,211 | 3.63 | +1.17 | $240.77 |
| Christian Heritage | Robert Scott | 363 | 1.09 | −0.23 | $706.54 |
| Total valid votes | | 33,369 | 99.60 | | |
| Total rejected ballots | | 133 | 0.40 | +0.12 | |
| Turnout | | 33,502 | 58.20 | +7.55 | |
| Electors on the lists | | 57,561 | | | |
| New Democratic hold | | Swing | | −3.58 | |
Sources: Official Results, Elections Canada and Financial Returns, Elections Canada.

2004 Canadian federal election
| Party | Candidate | Votes | % | ±% | Expenditures |
|---|---|---|---|---|---|
| New Democratic | Bill Blaikie | 15,221 | 51.99 | +3.84 | $37,459.54 |
| Conservative | Bryan McLeod | 7,644 | 26.11 | −5.58 | $33,737.79 |
| Liberal | Tanya Parks | 4,923 | 16.81 | −1.55 | $20,165.52 |
| Green | Elijah Gair | 719 | 2.46 | – | $204.72 |
| Christian Heritage | Robert Scott | 386 | 1.32 | – | $2,599.64 |
| Marijuana | Gavin Whittaker | 311 | 1.06 | – | – |
| Communist | Paul Sidon | 74 | 0.25 | – | $654.57 |
| Total valid votes | | 29,278 | 99.73 | | |
| Total rejected ballots | | 80 | 0.27 | | |
| Turnout | | 29,358 | 50.65 | | |
| Electors on the lists | | 57,965 | | | |
| New Democratic hold | | Swing | | +4.71 | |
Percentage change figures are factored for redistribution. Conservative Party percentages are contrasted with the combined Canadian Alliance and Progressive Conservative percentages from 2000.
Sources: Official Results, Elections Canada and Financial Returns, Elections Canada.

2000 federal election redistributed results
| Party | Vote | % |
|---|---|---|
| New Democratic | 15,205 | 48.15 |
| Canadian Alliance | 7,967 | 25.23 |
| Liberal | 5,801 | 18.37 |
| Progressive Conservative | 2,041 | 6.46 |
| Others | 566 | 1.79 |

=== Winnipeg—Transcona, 1997–2004 ===
Map of Winnipeg—Transcona in use from 1996 to 2003

2000 Canadian federal election: Winnipeg—Transcona
| Party | Candidate | Votes | % | ±% | Expenditures |
|---|---|---|---|---|---|
| New Democratic | Bill Blaikie | 15,680 | 47.85 | −2.42 | $35,468.07 |
| Alliance | Shawn Rattai | 8,336 | 25.44 | +8.21 | $21,800.25 |
| Liberal | Bret Dobbin | 6,041 | 18.43 | −3.03 | $17,596.32 |
| Progressive Conservative | Chris Brewer | 2,133 | 6.51 | −2.46 | – |
| Green | C. David Nickarz | 229 | 0.70 | – | – |
| Christian Heritage | Robert Scott | 146 | 0.45 | −0.83 | $3,639.93 |
| Independent | Theresa Ducharme | 118 | 0.36 | −0.13 | – |
| Communist | James Hogaboam | 87 | 0.27 | | $263.77 |
| Total valid votes | | 32,770 | 99.61 | | |
| Total rejected ballots | | 127 | 0.39 | −0.21 | |
| Turnout | | 32,897 | 58.38 | −1.97 | |
| Electors on the lists | | 56,345 | | | |
| New Democratic hold | | Swing | | −5.31 | |
Sources: Official Results, Elections Canada and Financial Returns, Elections Canada.

1997 Canadian federal election: Winnipeg—Transcona
| Party | Candidate | Votes | % | ±% | Expenditures |
|---|---|---|---|---|---|
| New Democratic | Bill Blaikie | 16,640 | 50.27 | +11.01 | $37,996 |
| Liberal | Rosemary Broadbent | 7,105 | 21.46 | −16.90 | $25,771 |
| Reform | Helen Sterzer | 5,703 | 17.23 | +3.42 | $19,506 |
| Progressive Conservative | Glenn Buffie | 2,968 | 8.97 | +4.01 | $7,682 |
| Christian Heritage | Robert Scott | 423 | 1.28 | | $3,633 |
| Independent | Theresa Ducharme | 161 | 0.49 | | $111 |
| Marxist–Leninist | Ken Kalturnyk | 104 | 0.31 | | $11 |
| Total valid votes | | 33,104 | 99.40 | | |
| Total rejected ballots | | 199 | 0.60 | | |
| Turnout | | 33,303 | 60.36 | | |
| Electors on the lists | | 55,177 | | | |
| New Democratic hold | | Swing | | +13.95 | |
Percentage change figures are factored for redistribution.
Sources: Official Results, Elections Canada and Financial Returns, Elections Canada.

1993 federal election redistributed results
| Party | Vote | % |
|---|---|---|
| New Democratic | 15,731 | 39.26 |
| Liberal | 15,371 | 38.36 |
| Reform | 5,531 | 13.80 |
| Progressive Conservative | 1,985 | 4.95 |
| Others | 1,453 | 3.63 |

=== Winnipeg—Transcona, 1988–1997 ===
Map of Winnipeg—Transcona used from 1987 to 1996

1993 Canadian federal election: Winnipeg—Transcona
| Party | Candidate | Votes | % | ±% | Expenditures |
|---|---|---|---|---|---|
| New Democratic | Bill Blaikie | 16,074 | 38.86 | −2.26 | $33,353 |
| Liberal | Art Miki | 15,855 | 38.33 | +6.45 | $45,977 |
| Reform | Helen Sterzer | 5,829 | 14.09 | – | $7,111 |
| Progressive Conservative | Brett Eckstein | 2,112 | 5.11 | −20.51 | $13,422 |
| National | Marnie Johnston | 900 | 2.18 | – | $14,483 |
| Christian Heritage | Robert Scott | 362 | 0.88 | – | $2,688 |
| Natural Law | Geoff Danyluk | 150 | 0.36 | – | $78 |
| Marxist–Leninist | Ken Kalturnyk | 42 | 0.10 | −0.17 | $216 |
| Canada Party | Bill Tataryn | 39 | 0.09 | – | $0 |
| Total valid votes | | 41,363 | 100.00 | | |
| Total rejected ballots | | 144 | 0.35 | +0.04 | |
| Turnout | | 41,507 | 70.15 | −5.32 | |
| Electors on the lists | | 59,169 | | | |
| New Democratic hold | | Swing | | −4.36 | |
Source: Thirty-fifth General Election, 1993: Official Voting Results, Published by the Chief Electoral Officer of Canada. Financial figures taken from official contributions and expenses provided by Elections Canada.

1988 Canadian federal election: Winnipeg—Transcona
| Party | Candidate | Votes | % |
|---|---|---|---|
| New Democratic | Bill Blaikie | 17,361 | 41.13 |
| Liberal | Shirley Timm-Rudolph | 13,460 | 31.88 |
| Progressive Conservative | Mike Thompson | 10,815 | 25.62 |
| Western Independence | Fred Cameron | 308 | 0.73 |
| Independent | Gerry West | 156 | 0.37 |
| Marxist–Leninist | Karen Naylor | 115 | 0.27 |
| Total valid votes | | 42,215 | 100.00 |
| Total rejected ballots | | 130 | 0.31 |
| Turnout | | 42,345 | 75.47 |
| Electors on the lists | | 56,110 | |

== See also ==
- List of Canadian electoral districts
- Historical federal electoral districts of Canada
