= Bill Blaikie =

Canadian politician (1951–2022)

The Reverend and Honourable Bill Blaikie PC OC
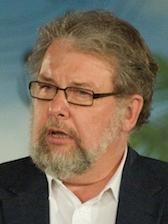
- Blaikie in 2012

Deputy leader of the New Democratic Party
- In office August 1, 2004 – October 14, 2008 Serving with Tom Mulcair (2007–2011) and Libby Davies (2007–2015)
- Leader: Jack Layton

House leader of the New Democratic Party
- In office January 11, 1996 – February 5, 2003
- Leader: Alexa McDonough; Jack Layton
- Preceded by: Len Taylor
- Succeeded by: Libby Davies

Parliamentary leader of the New Democratic Party
- In office January 25, 2003 – June 28, 2004
- Leader: Jack Layton
- Preceded by: Alexa McDonough (as leader)
- Succeeded by: Jack Layton (as leader)

Deputy Speaker of the House of Commons of Canada and Chairman of Committees of the Whole
- In office April 2006 – October 2008
- Preceded by: Chuck Strahl
- Succeeded by: Andrew Scheer

Member of Parliament for Elmwood—Transcona Winnipeg—Birds Hill (1979–1988) Winnipeg—Transcona (1988–2004)
- In office May 22, 1979 – October 14, 2008
- Preceded by: Riding established
- Succeeded by: Jim Maloway

Member of the Legislative Assembly of Manitoba for Elmwood
- In office March 24, 2009 – October 4, 2011
- Preceded by: Jim Maloway
- Succeeded by: Jim Maloway

Personal details
- Born: William Alexander Blaikie; June 19, 1951 Winnipeg, Manitoba, Canada
- Died: September 24, 2022 (aged 71) Winnipeg, Manitoba, Canada
- Party: New Democratic Party
- Other political affiliations: New Democratic Party of Manitoba
- Spouse: Brenda Blaikie
- Children: 4, including Rebecca Blaikie and Daniel Blaikie
- Education: University of Winnipeg; Emmanuel College, Toronto
- Profession: Clergyman

Military service
- Branch/service: Canadian Forces Mobile Command
- Years of service: 1967–1972
- Unit: The Queen's Own Cameron Highlanders of Canada

William Alexander "Bill" Blaikie PC OC (June 19, 1951 – September 24, 2022) was a Canadian politician. He served as a member of Parliament (MP) from 1979 to 2008, representing Elmwood—Transcona and its antecedent ridings in the House of Commons of Canada for the federal New Democratic Party. Following his retirement from federal politics, he was a member of the Legislative Assembly of Manitoba from 2009 until 2011, representing the Winnipeg division of Elmwood as a member of the New Democratic Party of Manitoba, and served as Minister of Conservation and Government House Leader.

Blaikie had the longest continuous parliamentary record in the 38th and 39th Canadian Parliaments, and in this capacity served as the Dean of the House. He was a member of the King's Privy Council for Canada. Blaikie was the Deputy Speaker of the House of Commons of Canada from 2006 to 2008.

Prior to the 2011 Manitoba election, he announced that he was retiring from political life.

== Early life and career ==
Blaikie was born to a working-class family in Winnipeg, Manitoba, on June 19, 1951. His parents were Kathleen Taylor and Robert Blaikie. He had two brothers, Bobby and Donnie (both of whom predeceased him), and a sister, Kim. His maternal grandfather, Alexander Taylor, was an emigrant from County Antrim in Northern Ireland who served as the police and fire chief and, in the last years of his life, justice of the peace for Transcona, during which time it was an independent community. His father was employed by Canadian National for over forty years, at first as a machinist and later in management. Blaikie served in The Queen's Own Cameron Highlanders of Canada from 1967 to 1972, and was a labourer on and off with the Canadian National Railway from 1969 to 1974 while attending university. He was a member of the Young Progressive Conservatives in high school, and joined the NDP in 1971.

Blaikie earned a Bachelor of Arts degree in philosophy and religious studies from the University of Winnipeg (1973), and a Master of Divinity from Emmanuel College, Toronto School of Theology (1977). He was ordained as a minister in the United Church of Canada on June 4, 1978, and subsequently became a politician in the social gospel tradition of such figures as J. S. Woodsworth, Tommy Douglas and Stanley Knowles. From 1977 to 1979, he worked as the Minister/Director of North End Community Ministry, an inner-city outreach ministry of the United Church located within the historic Stella Ave. Mission in Winnipeg.

== Federal parliamentarian ==
The New Democratic Party has never formed the national government in Canada, and Blaikie served in Ottawa for 29 years as an opposition MP. He held many important critic portfolios, and was respected by members of all parties for his personal integrity and conviction.

=== Clark, Trudeau and Turner governments (1979–84) ===
Blaikie was first elected to the House of Commons of Canada in the 1979 federal election, defeating incumbent Progressive Conservative MP Dean Whiteway (who had previously been elected in the riding of Selkirk, which was eliminated by redistribution). The Progressive Conservatives won a minority government under the leadership of Joe Clark, but lost a parliamentary motion of non-confidence later in the year. A new election was held in early 1980, in which the Liberal Party won a majority government under the leadership of Pierre Trudeau, who returned as Prime Minister of Canada. Blaikie was comfortably re-elected in his own riding.

Blaikie was appointed the NDP's Social Policy Critic in 1979, and was promoted to Health Critic in 1980. He was instrumental in forcing Minister of Health, Monique Bégin, to enact the Canada Health Act in 1984, to deal with the crisis in medicare due to user fees and physicians' extra-billing. In her memoirs, Bégin wrote that Blaikie waged "guerilla warfare" in the House of Commons over the issue. He also served as caucus chair in 1983–84.

=== Mulroney and Campbell governments (1984–93) ===
The Progressive Conservatives won a landslide majority government in the 1984 federal election under Brian Mulroney, defeating the Liberals under their new leader John Turner. Blaikie was again returned for his riding, and was appointed NDP Environment Critic in the new parliament. He opposed the Mulroney government's budget cuts and was strongly critical of Environment Minister, Suzanne Blais-Grenier, saying, "It is clear she does not think about the environment. She thinks about the deficit." He called for Blais-Grenier's resignation in June 1985, after she remarked that national parks could be opened to mining and logging. In the same year, Blaikie brought forward a private member's bill calling for a three-year moratorium on the construction and export of nuclear power stations, to be followed by a national referendum on any further development.

Blaikie spoke against a bill that proposed the return of capital punishment in 1987, saying that its passage would mark "a step toward not a less violent society, but a more violent society". The bill was defeated in a free vote. He was also an opponent of Sunday shopping law reform in this period, arguing that it interfered with a community's right to determine common rest times.

He was promoted to External Affairs Critic in September 1987. One of his first major policy statements in this portfolio was to call for Canada to stop allowing American cruise missile tests over its territory. He was also critical of Canada's proposed Free Trade Agreement with the United States, and released a document entitled A Time To Choose Canada, the New Democrats' Trade Option with fellow MP Steven Langdon in February 1988. He also served as co-chairman of the NDP's international affairs committee, and held consultation meetings on whether or not the party should reaffirm its traditional opposition to Canadian membership in the North Atlantic Treaty Organization.

Blaikie considered running for the leadership of the New Democratic Party of Manitoba in 1988, following the surprise resignation of Howard Pawley. He eventually chose not to run, and did not endorse any other candidate. He was retained as the NDP's External Affairs Critic after the Progressive Conservatives won a second consecutive majority government in the 1988 federal election, and was also chosen as his party's spokesman for federal–provincial relations and the Constitution. He was an international observer during Namibia's transformation to independence in 1989, and for Lithuania's first multi-party elections in early 1990.

There were rumours that Blaikie would seek the federal New Democratic Party leadership after Ed Broadbent's resignation in 1989, but he declined to run and instead supported Simon de Jong, whom he described as having the greatest awareness of environmental issues. When de Jong was eliminated on the second ballot at a delegated convention, Blaikie moved to the camp of Audrey McLaughlin, the eventual winner.

Blaikie was appointed NDP Taxation Critic in 1990. He opposed the Mulroney government's decision to cut social programs to pay down the deficit, calling instead for a tightening of tax loopholes. He was given further responsibilities as Transport Critic, and spoke against proposed job cuts at Canadian National.

=== Chrétien government (1993–2003) ===
==== In parliament ====
Blaikie's closest election came in 1993, when the Liberal Party under Jean Chrétien defeated the Progressive Conservatives under new leader Kim Campbell to win a majority government. The New Democratic Party's support base had fallen in this period, due to unpopular decisions made by the provincial NDP governments of Bob Rae in Ontario and Michael Harcourt in British Columbia. Blaikie defeated Liberal candidate Art Miki by only 219 votes in Winnipeg—Transcona while his party fell from 44 to 9 seats nationally. Between 1993 and 1997, Blaikie was the only New Democratic Party MP to represent a riding east of Saskatchewan. He was appointed NDP Critic for Foreign Affairs and Trade after the election, and served another term as caucus chairman from 1993 to 1996.

In early 1994, Blaikie won unanimous support in the House of Commons for a Private Member's Bill calling for the government to officially recognize Canadians who served in the Dieppe Raid in World War II. He initially proposed that a special medal be struck, but later accepted a Liberal amendment for a "distinctive decoration". He was disappointed with the final result, a simple silver bar with ribbon attachment that was given to all service personnel from 1939 to 1943. Blaikie voted against the Chrétien government's gun registry in 1995, arguing that it did not address the real problems of gun-related violence.

There were again rumours that Blaikie would run for the NDP leadership in 1995, but he declined and gave his support to Lorne Nystrom. When Nystrom was eliminated at the party's convention, Blaikie shifted his support to the winner, Alexa McDonough.

The duties of NDP MPs were shuffled after the leadership convention. Blaikie was named as House Leader, while continuing as International Trade Critic and adding the Intergovernmental Affairs portfolio. He continued to hold these parliamentary roles after the 1997 election, in which the Liberals won a second majority government and the NDP made a partial recovery to 21 seats.

Blaikie was re-elected to a seventh term in 2000, as the Liberals won a third majority government under Chrétien. He retained his position as House Leader and Intergovernment Affairs Critic, and gained additional duties as critic for Parliamentary Reform, Justice and the Solicitor-General. He played a key role in getting the NDP Caucus to support the Clarity Act in 2000, after securing amendments that were important to First Nations groups in Quebec.

==== Ideological views ====
Blaikie emerged as a prominent critic of economic globalization during the mid-1990s. In 1996, he wrote that new rules governing the World Trade Organization would shift oversight of public policy from elected governments to unelected trade bureaucrats. He expressed similar concerns about the Multilateral Agreement on Investment (MAI) two years later, arguing that it put the rights of investors ahead of workers, environments, societies, and cultures. He wrote the NDP Minority Report on the MAI, which was published in Dismantling Democracy (edited by Andrew Jackson and Matthew Sanger).

Blaikie wrote a 1994 editorial calling for the Bank of Canada to hold a larger portion of the national debt at low interest rates, as it did until the mid-1970s, in order for Canada to reduce its deficit while maintaining its core social programs. In 1998, he led a national campaign against proposed mergers for Canada's major banks.

During the late 1990s and early 2000s, the New Democratic Party members were divided as to the party's position on the Canadian political spectrum. Some wanted to take the party into a more centrist direction, similar to Tony Blair's "Third Way" in Britain, while others sought to move in a radical left-wing direction. Blaikie was not closely affiliated with either camp. He opposed Blair's ideological approach on the grounds that it was too closely aligned with corporate interests. He participated in anti-globalization protests in Seattle and Quebec City but also criticized the extra-parliamentary left's tactics, saying that protests would never bring economic change without mobilization in the political sphere. He opposed the New Politics Initiative at the NDP's 2001 convention, calling instead for a renewal of the existing party organization.

==== Leadership campaign ====
Blaikie was the first declared candidate in the 2003 leadership election. He called for a renewed focus on health care, natural resources and labour standards. Blaikie was seen as a representative of the party's moderate left, fitting ideologically between the centrist Lorne Nystrom and the more left-wing Jack Layton. He was supported by MPs Pat Martin, Judy Wasylycia-Leis, Bev Desjarlais, Wendy Lill, Yvon Godin and Dick Proctor, Manitoba Premier Gary Doer, New Democratic Party of Ontario leader Howard Hampton, and several former MPs including Simon de Jong, Dawn Black, Ian Waddell and Howard McCurdy. In declaring his candidacy, he said,

I've heard it said of the NDP that we are too attached to the past, but I tell you that it is our political opponents who are the Jurassic Park of Canadian politics. They would take us back to a meaner time when money was the measure of all things. We stand for the future that was sought and won and which must now be defended and enhanced.

The NDP's 2003 leadership convention was the first to be determined by a partial "one member, one vote" system in which all members of the NDP were eligible to cast ballots. Blaikie finished second to Jack Layton, who appointed him as Deputy Leader after the convention. As Layton did not have a seat in the Commons, Blaikie also served as the NDP's parliamentary leader until the 2004 federal election. This led to his being sworn in as a member of the Privy Council. He was also named as the NDP's National Defence Critic, and was front and centre in pushing the Liberals to not participate in the Iraq War, in opposing Canadian participation in ballistic missile defence, and in asking questions about the rules of engagement and changing role of Canadian troops in Afghanistan.

=== Martin government (2003–06) ===
Paul Martin succeeded Jean Chrétien as leader of the Liberal Party in November 2003 and as Prime Minister of Canada in December 2003, called a new election for June 2004. During this campaign, Blaikie openly disagreed with Layton's proposal that the Clarity Act be repealed. The Liberals were reduced to a minority government, and the NDP increased its representation from 14 to 19 seats. Blaikie continued as Deputy Leader and Defence Critic, and was also named as Health Critic. Notwithstanding their disagreement over the Clarity Act, Blaikie said that he enjoyed a good working relationship with Layton in parliament.

=== Harper government (2006–08) ===
The Conservative Party under Stephen Harper won a minority government in the 2006 federal election. Following the resumption of parliament in April, Blaikie was named as Deputy Speaker of the House of Commons. This position largely removed him from the day-to-day business of House debates, and put him in the role of a non-partisan overseer.

=== Parliamentary reform ===
Blaikie was an advocate for the reform of parliamentary institutions throughout his time in parliament. He served as second vice-chairman of an all-party committee on parliamentary reform in 1985, which among other things made it easier for private member's bills to come to a vote. He took part in another such committee in 1992, which issued a thirty-page report calling for more free votes, reforms to the parliamentary Question Period, and a streamlined process for passing legislation. He participated in a third such committee in 2001, although he indicated that he was disappointed with its results.

=== Retirement ===
On March 15, 2007, Blaikie announced that he would not be a candidate in the next federal election. He accepted a position as adjunct professor of Theology and Politics at the University of Winnipeg, and announced plans to write a book on the relationship between faith and politics. When he left the House of Commons in September 2008, he wrote an editorial that criticized parliament's declining standards, referring specifically to a rise in "character assassination, simulated indignation, and trivial pursuit over substantial debate".

Blaikie was a contributor to Northern Lights: An Anthology of Contemporary Christian Writing in Canada, which was published shortly after the 2008 federal election.

== Provincial politics and later life ==
In December 2008, Blakie announced that he would seek the NDP nomination for the provincial division of Elmwood, which had been vacated by Jim Maloway, Blaikie's own successor in the federal riding of Elmwood—Transcona. He won the nomination unopposed, after two previously declared candidates withdrew to support him. Both Blaikie and Maloway have rejected the suggestion that they planned to "swap" their federal and provincial seats, and Blaikie has said that he returned to political life on the request of Premier Gary Doer. He was elected without difficulty in late March 2009, and formally joined the legislature the following month. On November 3, 2009, Blaikie was appointed to the cabinet of Premier Greg Selinger as the Minister of Conservation and Government House Leader.

As Conservation Minister, Blaikie stewarded the development of five new provincial parks in Manitoba in 2011 and played a significant role in the government's attempts to protect the boreal forest on the east side of Lake Winnipeg. A year later, he was conferred the Crocus Award from Nature Manitoba for his role in creating the five provincial parks.

On July 11, 2011, Blaikie announced that he would not be re-offering at the October 4 provincial election and would be retiring from political life.

Blaikie was appointed to the Order of Canada in November 2020 "for his lifelong contributions to parliamentary service and for his steadfast commitment to progressive change and social activism." Amid the COVID-19 pandemic in Canada, he was invested virtually on February 26, 2021.

Blaikie died from kidney cancer at his home in Winnipeg on September 24, 2022, at the age of 71. His funeral was held on 2 October 2022 at a church in the Winnipeg suburb of Transcona, which was attended by family members, close friends, as well as federal NDP leader Jagmeet Singh, provincial NDP leader Wab Kinew and former Manitoba premier Greg Selinger.

== Other information ==
- In 1988, Blaikie and House of Commons Speaker John Fraser organized the first annual Robbie Burns supper on Parliament Hill. Blaikie delivered the ritual address to the haggis, and played a few unscheduled tunes on the bagpipes.
- In February 2001, parliamentarians were polled on the most effective member of the House of Commons of Canada. Blaikie tied for third place with Prime Minister Jean Chrétien.
- On November 21, 2007, Blaikie was given the Maclean's award for Best Parliamentarian of the Year, as voted by his peers.
- Blaikie held the record as having the longest continuous parliamentary service of any CCF/NDP MP in Canadian history.
- Blaikie's daughter, Rebecca Blaikie, was the New Democratic Party candidate for LaSalle—Émard (challenging Prime Minister Paul Martin) in the 2004 federal election. As executive director of the party's Quebec wing, she was one of the architects of Tom Mulcair's historic victory in a 2007 Outremont by-election and was widely credited with setting the groundwork for the party's 2011 sweep of the province. She then returned to Manitoba to work for the provincial government and the non-profit Community Education Development Association. In the 2011 election, she ran in Winnipeg North, losing to Liberal MP Kevin Lamoureux by 44 votes.
- Blaikie's son Daniel Blaikie was elected the NDP member for Elmwood—Transcona in the October 2015 federal election, and was re-elected in the 2019 and 2021 federal elections.

== Selected published works ==
- Langdon, Steven; Blaikie, Bill (1988). A Time to Choose Canada: The New Democrats' Trade Option (paper). Ottawa: New Democratic Party. OCLC 369138283.
- Blaikie, Bill (1991). "Via Cut Kills Community Camping Tradition". Canadian Dimension. Winnipeg. ISSN 0008-3402.
- — (1992). "Putting our House in Order". New Democratic Alternative. New Democratic Party. ISSN 1183-0247.
- — (May 1992). "The Canadian Clearances". Canadian Forum. 71. Toronto. ISSN 0008-3631.
- — (June 1992). "Freedom to do what?". Policy Options. Montreal: Institute for Research on Public Policy. ISSN 0711-0677.
- — (1994). "The Status of Small Parties in the House of Commons" (PDF). Canadian Parliamentary Review. 17 (3): 29–32. ISSN 0229-2548.
- — (June 1996). "We shouldn't contend ourselves with nuclear disarmament. The madness is still rampant". United Church Observer. ISSN 0041-7238.
- — (1997). "The case for a twenty-first-century NDP". British Journal of Canadian Studies. 11 (2). Liverpool University Press: 201–209. ISSN 0269-9222.
- — (March 1997). "World Trade Organization spurns workers' rights". Canadian Dimension. 31 (2). Winnipeg: 31–32. ISSN 0008-3402. Archived from the original on May 17, 2014.
- — (May 1997). "Canadian arms exports: a parliamentarian's motion on controls". Peace Research. 29. ISSN 0008-4697.
- — (2000). "Revitalizing Democracy in the Era of Corporate Globalization" (PDF). Canadian Parliamentary Review. 23 (1): 10–13. ISSN 0229-2548.
- Boudria, Don; Reynolds, John; Guimond, Michel; Blaikie, Bill & Herron, John (2003). "Round Table on Modernizing the House of Commons" (PDF). Canadian Parliamentary Review. 26 (1): 30–40. ISSN 0229-2548.
- Blaikie, Bill (September 2005). "Not all Religious People are Conservatives: Still Room on the Left for Both Believers and Non-Believers". CCPA Monitor. 12 (4). Ottawa: Canadian Centre for Policy Alternatives. ISSN 1198-497X.
- —; Boyer, Patrick; Boudria, Don; Dalphond-Guiral, Madeleine & Nystrom, Lorne (2006). "The Wisdom of the Elders: A Round Table on Reform of the House of Commons" (PDF). Canadian Parliamentary Review. 29 (3): 33–39. ISSN 0229-2548.
- — (2011). The Blaikie Report: An Insider's Look at Faith And Politics. Toronto: United Church Publishing House. ISBN 9781551341880. OCLC 751636003.

== Electoral record ==
=== Federal ===
2006 Canadian federal election: Elmwood—Transcona
Party	Candidate	Votes	%	±%	Expenditures
New Democratic	Bill Blaikie	16,967	50.85	−1.14	$40,314.57
Conservative	Linda West	10,720	32.13	+6.02	$68,007.66
Liberal	Tanya Parks	4,108	12.31	−4.50	$12,622.61
Green	Tanja Hutter	1,211	3.63	+1.17	$240.77
Christian Heritage	Robert Scott	363	1.09	−0.23	$706.54
Total valid votes		33,369	99.60		
Total rejected ballots		133	0.40	+0.12	
Turnout		33,502	58.20	+7.55	
Electors on the lists		57,561			
New Democratic hold		Swing		−3.58	
Sources: Official Results, Elections Canada and Financial Returns, Elections Canada.

2004 Canadian federal election: Elmwood—Transcona
Party	Candidate	Votes	%	±%	Expenditures
New Democratic	Bill Blaikie	15,221	51.99	+3.84	$37,459.54
Conservative	Bryan McLeod	7,644	26.11	−5.58	$33,737.79
Liberal	Tanya Parks	4,923	16.81	−1.55	$20,165.52
Green	Elijah Gair	719	2.46	–	$204.72
Christian Heritage	Robert Scott	386	1.32	–	$2,599.64
Marijuana	Gavin Whittaker	311	1.06	–	–
Communist	Paul Sidon	74	0.25	–	$654.57
Total valid votes		29,278	99.73		
Total rejected ballots		80	0.27		
Turnout		29,358	50.65		
Electors on the lists		57,965			
New Democratic hold		Swing		+4.71	
Percentage change figures are factored for redistribution. Conservative Party percentages are contrasted with the combined Canadian Alliance and Progressive Conservative percentages from 2000.
Sources: Official Results, Elections Canada and Financial Returns, Elections Canada.

2000 Canadian federal election: Winnipeg—Transcona
Party	Candidate	Votes	%	±%	Expenditures
New Democratic	Bill Blaikie	15,680	47.85	−2.42	$35,468.07
Alliance	Shawn Rattai	8,336	25.44	+8.21	$21,800.25
Liberal	Bret Dobbin	6,041	18.43	−3.03	$17,596.32
Progressive Conservative	Chris Brewer	2,133	6.51	−2.46	–
Green	C. David Nickarz	229	0.70	–	–
Christian Heritage	Robert Scott	146	0.45	−0.83	$3,639.93
Independent	Theresa Ducharme	118	0.36	−0.13	–
Communist	James Hogaboam	87	0.27		$263.77
Total valid votes		32,770	99.61		
Total rejected ballots		127	0.39	−0.21	
Turnout		32,897	58.38	−1.97	
Electors on the lists		56,345			
New Democratic hold		Swing		−5.31	
Sources: Official Results, Elections Canada and Financial Returns, Elections Canada.

1997 Canadian federal election: Winnipeg—Transcona
Party	Candidate	Votes	%	±%	Expenditures
New Democratic	Bill Blaikie	16,640	50.27	+11.01	$37,996
Liberal	Rosemary Broadbent	7,105	21.46	−16.90	$25,771
Reform	Helen Sterzer	5,703	17.23	+3.42	$19,506
Progressive Conservative	Glenn Buffie	2,968	8.97	+4.01	$7,682
Christian Heritage	Robert Scott	423	1.28		$3,633
Independent	Theresa Ducharme	161	0.49		$111
Marxist–Leninist	Ken Kalturnyk	104	0.31		$11
Total valid votes		33,104	99.40		
Total rejected ballots		199	0.60		
Turnout		33,303	60.36		
Electors on the lists		55,177			
New Democratic hold		Swing		+13.95	
Percentage change figures are factored for redistribution.
Sources: Official Results, Elections Canada and Financial Returns, Elections Canada.

1993 Canadian federal election: Winnipeg—Transcona
Party	Candidate	Votes	%	±%	Expenditures
New Democratic	Bill Blaikie	16,074	38.86	−2.26	$33,353
Liberal	Art Miki	15,855	38.33	+6.45	$45,977
Reform	Helen Sterzer	5,829	14.09	–	$7,111
Progressive Conservative	Brett Eckstein	2,112	5.11	−20.51	$13,422
National	Marnie Johnston	900	2.18	–	$14,483
Christian Heritage	Robert Scott	362	0.88	–	$2,688
Natural Law	Geoff Danyluk	150	0.36	–	$78
Marxist–Leninist	Ken Kalturnyk	42	0.10	−0.17	$216
Canada Party	Bill Tataryn	39	0.09	–	$0
Total valid votes		41,363	100.00		
Total rejected ballots		144	0.35	+0.04	
Turnout		41,507	70.15	−5.32	
Electors on the lists		59,169			
New Democratic hold		Swing		−4.36	
Source: Thirty-fifth General Election, 1993: Official Voting Results, Published by the Chief Electoral Officer of Canada. Financial figures taken from official contributions and expenses provided by Elections Canada.

1988 Canadian federal election: Winnipeg—Transcona
Party	Candidate	Votes	%
New Democratic	Bill Blaikie	17,361	41.13
Liberal	Shirley Timm-Rudolph	13,460	31.88
Progressive Conservative	Mike Thompson	10,815	25.62
Western Independence	Fred Cameron	308	0.73
Independent	Gerry West	156	0.37
Marxist–Leninist	Karen Naylor	115	0.27
Total valid votes		42,215	100.00
Total rejected ballots		130	0.31
Turnout		42,345	75.47
Electors on the lists		56,110	

1984 Canadian federal election: Winnipeg—Birds Hill
Party	Candidate	Votes	%	±%
New Democratic	Bill Blaikie	23,903	45.81	−8.47
Progressive Conservative	John Hare	20,644	39.56	+10.12
Liberal	Lil Johnson	5,447	10.44	−5.00
Confederation of Regions	Al MacDonald	1,069	2.05	
Rhinoceros	Honest Don Bergen	569	1.09	+0.38
Independent	Edward G. Price	549	1.05	
Total valid votes		52,181	100.00	
Total rejected ballots		163		
Turnout		52,344	76.70	+7.32
Electors on the lists		68,248		
New Democratic hold		Swing		−9.29

1980 Canadian federal election: Winnipeg—Birds Hill
Party	Candidate	Votes	%	±%
New Democratic	Bill Blaikie	24,672	54.27	+4.11
Progressive Conservative	John Froese	13,385	29.44	−9.00
Liberal	Ron Wally	7,020	15.44	+4.28
Rhinoceros	Honest Don Bergen	322	0.71	–
Marxist–Leninist	Karen Naylor	60	0.13	+0.02
Total valid votes		Total valid votes	45,459	100.00
Total rejected ballots		84		
Turnout		45,543	69.38	−12.28
Electors on the lists		65,647		
New Democratic hold		Swing		+6.55

1979 Canadian federal election: Winnipeg—Birds Hill
Party	Candidate	Votes	%
New Democratic	Bill Blaikie	25,492	50.16
Progressive Conservative	Dean Whiteway	19,536	38.44
Liberal	Ronald Wally	5,674	11.16
Communist	Harold J. Dyck	62	0.12
Marxist–Leninist	Karen Naylor	56	0.11
Total valid votes		50,820	100.00
Total rejected ballots		107	
Turnout		50,927	81.66
Electors on the lists		62,361	

All electoral information is taken from Elections Canada. Italicized expenditures from elections after 1997 refer to submitted totals, and are presented when the final reviewed totals are not available. Expenditures from 1997 refer to submitted totals. The +/- figures from 1988, 1997 and 2004 are adjusted for redistribution.

=== Provincial ===
Manitoba provincial by-election, March 24, 2009: Elmwood Resignation of Jim Maloway
Party	Candidate	Votes	%	±%	Expenditures
New Democratic	Bill Blaikie	2,325	53.76	-7.75	$17,603.25
Progressive Conservative	Adrian Schulz	913	21.11	0.10	$15,919.78
Liberal	Regan Wolfrom	877	20.28	2.79	$27,106.33
Green	James R. Beddome	210	4.86	–	$1,115.73
Total valid votes		4,325	–	–	
Rejected		14	–		
Eligible voters / turnout		11,907	36.44	−13.54	
Source(s) Source:
