= Lawrence Toet =

Canadian politician

Member of Parliament for Elmwood—Transcona
- In office May 2, 2011 – October 19, 2015
- Preceded by: Jim Maloway
- Succeeded by: Daniel Blaikie

Personal details
- Born: January 2, 1962 (age 64) Winnipeg, Manitoba, Canada
- Party: Conservative

Lawrence Toet (born January 2, 1962) is a Canadian politician. Born a child of Dutch parents who moved to Canada in the early fifties, he was elected to the House of Commons of Canada for the federal Conservative Party of Canada in the 2011 election, representing the electoral district of Elmwood—Transcona. In the 2015 election, Toet was defeated by NDP candidate Daniel Blaikie by 61 votes.

He won again the candidacy for the Conservative Party of Canada for the riding of Elmwood-Transcona in March 2018 but failed to win back his seat in 2019.

He attempted to be the Conservative candidate in the 2023 Portage—Lisgar federal by-election. He was endorsed by the constituency's former MP Charles Mayer, however he was unsuccessful in the nomination.

== Before politics ==
From 1984 to 2009, Toet was a partner at Premier Printing, a family owned business in Transcona.

== Electoral record ==
2019 Canadian federal election: Elmwood—Transcona
Party	Candidate	Votes	%	±%	Expenditures
New Democratic	Daniel Blaikie	19,786	45.63	+11.49	$84,787.58
Conservative	Lawrence Toet	16,240	37.45	+3.45	$90,425.22
Liberal	Jennifer Malabar	5,346	12.33	-17.18	$35,581.50
Green	Kelly Manweiler	1,480	3.41	+1.05	none listed
People's	Noel Gautron	512	1.18	–	$2,119.25
Total valid votes/expense limit		43,364	99.28		
Total rejected ballots		313	0.72	+0.30	
Turnout		43,677	62.34	-3.26	
Eligible voters		70,062			
New Democratic hold		Swing		+4.02	
Source: Elections Canada

2015 Canadian federal election
Party	Candidate	Votes	%	±%	Expenditures
New Democratic	Daniel Blaikie	14,709	34.14	-10.67	$109,753.17
Conservative	Lawrence Toet	14,648	34.00	-12.92	$127,718.93
Liberal	Andrea Richardson-Lipon	12,713	29.51	+24.32	$23,842.58
Green	Kim Parke	1,016	2.36	-0.71	–
Total valid votes/Expense limit		43,086	99.58		$199,824.02
Total rejected ballots		182	0.42	–	
Turnout		43,268	66.35	–	
Eligible voters		65,207			
New Democratic gain from Conservative		Swing		+1.12	
Source: Elections Canada

2011 Canadian federal election
Party	Candidate	Votes	%	±%	Expenditures
Conservative	Lawrence Toet	15,298	46.40	+5.66	–
New Democratic	Jim Maloway	14,998	45.49	-0.29	–
Liberal	Ilona Niemczyk	1,660	5.03	-1.59	–
Green	Ellen Young	1,017	3.08	-2.78	–
Total valid votes/Expense limit		32,973	99.66		–
Total rejected ballots		112	0.34	+0.02	
Turnout		33,085	55.93	+1.89	
Eligible voters		59,154	–	–	
Conservative gain from New Democratic		Swing		+2.97	
