= Daniel Blaikie =

Canadian politician (born 1984)

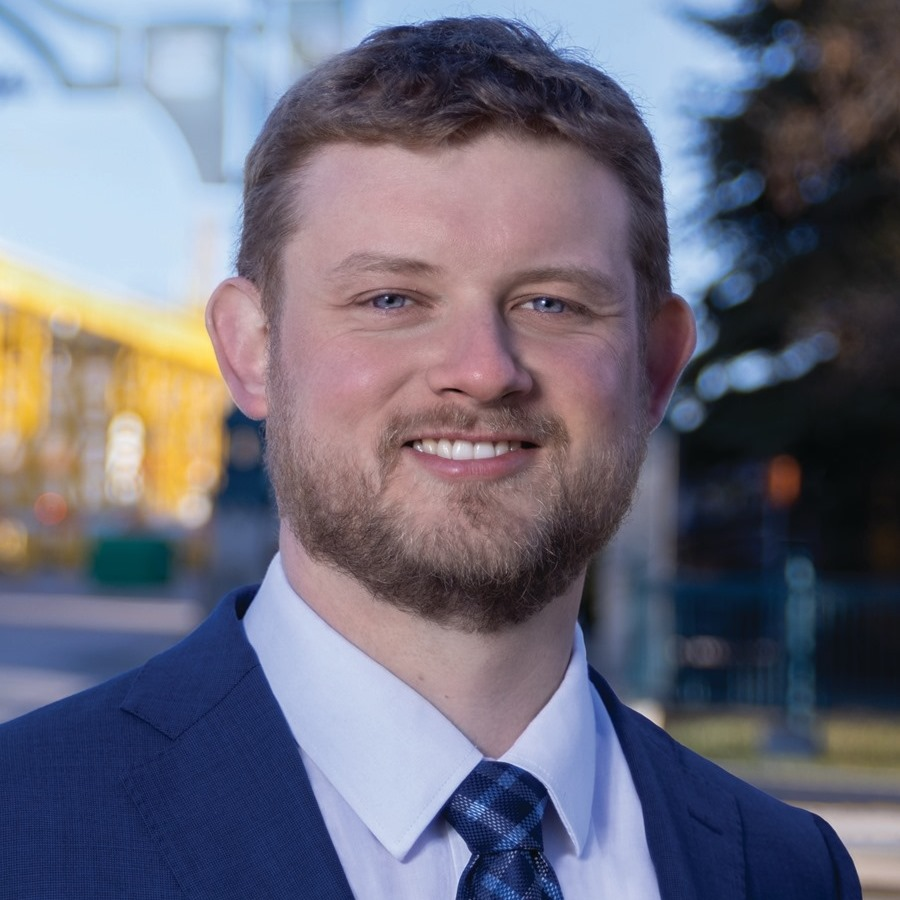
- Blaikie in 2019

Member of Parliament for Elmwood—Transcona
- In office October 19, 2015 – March 31, 2024
- Preceded by: Lawrence Toet
- Succeeded by: Leila Dance

Personal details
- Born: 1984 (age 41–42) Winnipeg, Manitoba, Canada
- Party: New Democratic
- Spouse: Janelle Blaikie
- Relations: Rebecca Blaikie (sister)
- Parents: Bill Blaikie; Brenda Blaikie
- Education: University of Winnipeg (BA); Concordia University (MA)
- Profession: Politician; electrician
- Website: danielblaikie.ndp.ca

Daniel Blaikie is a Canadian politician who served as the member of Parliament (MP) for Elmwood—Transcona from October 19, 2015 until March 31, 2024. A member of the New Democratic Party (NDP), he was elected to the House of Commons in the 2015 federal election. He is currently Deputy Minister for Intergovernmental Affairs of Manitoba.

== Early life and education ==
Daniel Blaikie was born to Brenda and Bill Blaikie in the northeast Winnipeg suburb of Transcona. He studied philosophy and history at the University of Winnipeg, earning a Bachelor of Arts (BA), before earning a Master of Arts (MA) in philosophy at Concordia University in Montreal.

Blaikie taught introductory courses in philosophy at the University of Winnipeg and later trained as an electrician, becoming very active in the International Brotherhood of Electrical Workers.

== Community work ==
Blaikie has been involved in several community engagements in Transcona, Winnipeg, and in the province of Manitoba. He has sat on the board of directors of the Transcona Historical Museum in the past and continues to maintain his interest and involvement with the museum. As an MP, he currently sits as an honorary board member.

Blaikie is an active associate member of the Royal Canadian Legion - Branch #7, known by locals as the Transcona Legion. With its official formation date being December 6, 1926, the legion celebrated its 90th anniversary in 2016. He commemorated the anniversary as a Member of Parliament by using his allotted time for Statements by Members in the House of Commons to speak to the Legion's history and relevance in the community.

Before becoming an MP, Blaikie was a board member of the Apprenticeship and Certification Board of Manitoba, which coordinates the apprenticeship and certification system in Manitoba.

After being elected to the House of Commons, Daniel Blaikie continued to sit on the executive of the Winnipeg Labour Council for a period. During his electoral campaign in 2015, the council was active in supporting his campaign to become a Member of Parliament.

== Political career ==
Blaikie was nominated as the NDP candidate for his father's former riding ahead of the 2015 election. He defeated Conservative incumbent Lawrence Toet by only 61 votes, the lowest margin of victory for any MP elected that year. He was the only non-Liberal elected from a Winnipeg riding. He defeated Toet in a 2019 rematch by a much larger margin of over 3,500.

=== Member of Parliament ===
Blaikie was a Vice-Chair of the Standing Committee on Access to Information, Privacy and Ethics, and was also a member of several parliamentary associations, including the Canada-Europe Parliamentary Association, Canada-Ireland Interparliamentary Group, Canada-United Kingdom Inter-Parliamentary Association, Canada-United States Inter-Parliamentary Group, and Commonwealth Parliamentary Association (CPA), as well a part of the Canadian Delegations to the Organization for Security and Co-operation in Europe Parliamentary Assembly (OSCE PA), NATO Parliamentary Association (NATO PA).

Blaikie announced his resignation from parliament, effective March 31, 2024, in order to accept a position in the office of Manitoba Premier Wab Kinew as special advisor on intergovernmental affairs.

=== Deputy minister ===
Blaikie was appointed Deputy Minister for Intergovernmental Affairs on August 26, 2025, after serving as Senior Advisor to the Premier for Intergovernmental Affairs since April 15, 2024.

== Electoral record ==
2021 Canadian federal election: Elmwood—Transcona
Party	Candidate	Votes	%	±%	Expenditures
New Democratic	Daniel Blaikie	20,791	49.69	+4.07	$63,992.50
Conservative	Rejeanne Caron	11,768	28.13	-9.32	$53,284.18
Liberal	Sara Mirwaldt	6,169	14.74	+2.42	$10,073.29
People's	Jamie Cumming	2,435	5.82	+4.64	$276.86
Green	Devlin Hinchey	676	1.62	-1.80	$0.00
Total valid votes/expense limit		41,839	99.26	–	$106,782.98
Total rejected ballots		314	0.74	+0.03	
Turnout		42,153	59.62	-2.72	
Eligible voters		70,701			
New Democratic hold		Swing		+6.69	
Source: Elections Canada

2019 Canadian federal election: Elmwood—Transcona
Party	Candidate	Votes	%	±%	Expenditures
New Democratic	Daniel Blaikie	19,786	45.63	+11.49	$84,787.58
Conservative	Lawrence Toet	16,240	37.45	+3.45	$90,425.22
Liberal	Jennifer Malabar	5,346	12.33	-17.18	$35,581.50
Green	Kelly Manweiler	1,480	3.41	+1.05	none listed
People's	Noel Gautron	512	1.18	–	$2,119.25
Total valid votes/expense limit		43,364	99.28		
Total rejected ballots		313	0.72	+0.30	
Turnout		43,677	62.34	-3.26	
Eligible voters		70,062			
New Democratic hold		Swing		+4.02	
Source: Elections Canada

2015 Canadian federal election: Elmwood-Transcona
Party	Candidate	Votes	%	±%	Expenditures
New Democratic	Daniel Blaikie	14,709	34.14	-10.67	–
Conservative	Lawrence Toet	14,648	34.00	-12.92	–
Liberal	Andrea Richardson-Lipon	12,713	29.51	+24.32	–
Green	Kim Parke	1,016	2.36	-0.71	–
Total valid votes/Expense limit		43,086	100.00		$198,870.74
Total rejected ballots		182	0.42	–	
Turnout		43,268	66.35	–	
Eligible voters		65,207			
New Democratic gain from Conservative		Swing		+1.12	
Source: Elections Canada
