= List of neighbourhoods in Winnipeg =

This is a list of neighbourhoods in Winnipeg, Manitoba, Canada. There are 236-237 neighbourhoods in Winnipeg.

Major wards/districts include St. Boniface, St. Norbert, St. Vital, Transcona, St. James-Assiniboia, Tuxedo, Garden City, Fort Garry, Fort Rouge, River Heights, Charleswood, North Kildonan, West Kildonan, East Kildonan, the North End, the West End, the Northwest, and City Centre.

== Neighbourhoods ==
Neighbourhoods of Winnipeg as of the 2021 census.

A

- Agassiz
- Airport
- Alpine Place
- Amber Trails
- Archwood
- Armstrong Point
- Assiniboia Downs
- Assiniboine Park

B

- Beaumont
- Betsworth
- Birchwood
- Booth
- Bridgwater Centre
- Bridgwater Forest
- Bridgwater Lakes
- Bridgwater Trails
- Broadway - Assiniboine
- Brockville
- Brooklands
- Bruce Park
- Buchanan
- Buffalo
- Burrows Central
- Burrows - Keewatin

C

- Canterbury Park
- Centennial
- Central Park
- Central River Heights
- Central St. Boniface
- Chalmers
- Chevrier
- China Town
- Civic Centre
- Cloutier Drive
- Colony
- Crescent Park
- Crescentwood
- Crestview

D

- Dakota Crossing
- Daniel McIntyre
- Deer Lodge
- Dufferin
- Dufferin Industrial
- Dufresne
- Dugald

E

- Eaglemere
- Earl Grey
- East Elmwood
- Ebby - Wentworth
- Edgeland
- Elm Park
- Elmhurst
- Eric Coy
- Exchange District

F

- Fairfield Park
- Forks, The
- Fort Richmond
- Fraipont

G

- Garden City
- Glendale
- Glenelm
- Glenwood
- Grant Park
- Grassie
- Griffin

H

- Heritage Park
- Holden

I

- Inkster - Faraday
- Inkster Gardens
- Inkster Industrial Park
- Island Lakes

J

- J.B. Mitchell
- Jameswood
- Jefferson

K

- Kensington
- Kern Park
- Kil-cona Park
- Kildare - Redonda
- Kildonan Crossing
- Kildonan Drive
- Kildonan Park
- King Edward
- Kingston Crescent
- Kirkfield

L

- La Barriere
- Lavalee
- Legislature
- Leila - McPhillips Triangle
- Leila North
- Linden Ridge
- Linden Woods
- Logan - C.P.R
- Lord Roberts
- Lord Selkirk Park
- Luxton

M

- Maginot
- Mandalay West
- Maple Grove Park
- Maples, The
- Margaret Park
- Marlton
- Mathers
- Maybank
- McLeod Industrial
- McMillan
- Meadowood
- Meadows
- Melrose
- Minnetonka
- Mint, The
- Minto
- Mission Gardens
- Mission Industrial
- Montcalm
- Munroe East
- Munroe West
- Murray Industrial Park
- Mynarski

N

- Niakwa Park
- Niakwa Place
- Norberry
- Normand Park
- North Inkster Industrial
- North Point Douglas
- North River Heights
- North St. Boniface
- North Transcona Yards
- Norwood East
- Norwood West

O

- Oak Point Highway
- Old Tuxedo
- Omand's Creek Industrial

P

- Pacific Industrial
- Parc La Salle
- Parker
- Peguis
- Pembina Strip
- Perrault
- Point Road
- Polo Park
- Portage and Main
- Portage - Ellice
- Prairie Pointe
- Pulberry

R

- Radisson
- Regent
- Richmond Lakes
- Richmond West
- Ridgedale
- Ridgewood South
- River - Osborne
- River East
- River Park South
- River West Park
- Riverbend
- Rivergrove
- Riverview
- Robertson
- Roblin Park
- Rockwood
- Roslyn
- Rosser - Old Kildonan
- Rossmere - A
- Rossmere - B
- Royalwood

S

- Sage Creek
- Sargent Park
- Saskatchewan North
- Seven Oaks
- Shaughnessy Park
- Silver Heights
- Sir John Franklin
- South Point Douglas
- South Pointe
- South Portage
- South River Heights
- South Tuxedo
- Southboine
- Southdale
- Southland Park
- Spence
- Springfield North
- Springfield South
- St. Boniface Industrial Park
- St. George
- St. James Industrial
- St. John's Park
- St. John's
- St. Matthews
- St. Norbert
- St. Vital Centre
- St. Vital Perimeter South
- Stock Yards
- Sturgeon Creek
- Symington Yards

T

- Talbot - Grey
- Templeton - Sinclair
- Tissot
- Transcona North
- Transcona South
- Transcona Yards
- Trappistes
- Turnbull Drive
- Tuxedo
- Tuxedo Industrial
- Tyndall Park
- Tyne-Tees

U

- University

V

- Valhalla
- Valley Gardens
- Varennes
- Varsity View
- Vialoux
- Victoria Crescent
- Victoria West
- Vista

W

- Waverley Heights
- Waverley West B
- Wellington Crescent
- West Alexander
- West Broadway
- West Fort Garry Industrial
- West Kildonan Industrial
- West Perimeter South
- West Wolseley
- Westdale
- Weston
- Weston Shops
- Westwood
- Whyte Ridge
- Wildwood
- Wilkes South
- William Whyte
- Windsor Park
- Wolseley
- Woodhaven
- Worthington

== Community areas and neighbourhood clusters ==
Winnipeg has been subdivided into two levels of areas developed by the Community Data Network of the national Canadian Community Economic Development Network: Community areas and neighbourhood clusters.

Community areas are the broader, less detailed level of areas, which allow for geographical analysis and comparisons, i.e. census data, as used by Statistics Canada. Community areas are composed of neighbourhood clusters, which are used for planning and policy purposes by Manitoba Health and the Winnipeg Regional Health Authority (WRHA).

- Assiniboine South
- Downtown
  - Downtown East
  - Downtown West
- Fort Garry
  - Fort Garry North
  - Fort Garry South
- Inkster
  - Inkster East
  - Inkster West
- Point Douglas
  - Point Douglas North
  - Point Douglas South
- River East
  - River East East
  - River East South
  - River East West
- River Heights
  - River Heights East
  - River Heights West
- Seven Oaks
  - Seven Oaks East
  - Seven Oaks West
- St. Boniface
  - St. Boniface East
  - St. Boniface West
- St.James–Assiniboia
  - St. James-Assiniboia East
  - St. James-Assiniboia West
- St. Vital
  - St. Vital North
  - St. Vital South
- Transcona

== Wards ==
- Charleswood – Tuxedo – Westwood
- Daniel McIntyre
- Elmwood – East Kildonan
- Fort Rouge – East Fort Garry
- Mynarski
- North Kildonan
- Old Kildonan
- Point Douglas
- River Heights – Fort Garry
- St. Boniface
- St. James
- St. Norbert – Seine River
- St. Vital
- Transcona
- Waverley West

== Business Improvement Zones ==
Winnipeg's Business Improvement Zones (BIZ) are business districts established to enhances economic development for businesses in a particular neighbourhood. Each BIZ is governed and administered by a board, and is regulated by related BIZ by-laws passed by City Council.

As of 2022, the City of Winnipeg has 16 Business Improvement Zones:

- Academy Road BIZ
- Corydon Avenue BIZ
- Downtown Winnipeg BIZ
- Exchange District BIZ
- North End BIZ
- Norwood Grove BIZ
- Old St Vital BIZ
- Osborne Village BIZ
- Provencher Blvd BIZ
- St James Village BIZ
- St Norbert BIZ
- Selkirk Avenue BIZ
- South Osborne BIZ
- Transcona BIZ
- West Broadway BIZ
- West End BIZ

== Other recognized areas ==
- Charleswood
- East Kildonan
- Fort Rouge
- North End
- Osborne Village
- West End
- West Kildonan
- Wildwood Park

== See also ==
- Subdivisions of Winnipeg
