= Subdivisions of Winnipeg =

Areas of city in Canada

Winnipeg, Manitoba, is subdivided in different ways for different purposes. The suburbs and neighbourhoods of Winnipeg take their names from former administrative districts, parishes, and geographic features.

== City wards ==
As of 2021, the City of Winnipeg is subdivided into 15 electoral wards, each represented by an individual member of City Council. The 15 city wards are further subdivided into 230 neighbourhoods.

Under the City of Winnipeg Charter, the boundaries and the name of each ward of Winnipeg are to be established at least every 10 years by a report prepared by the Winnipeg Wards Boundaries Commission (WWBC). In December 2017, the WWBC published its final report on new ward boundaries for the city, to be made effective September 2018. The Commission made its recommendations in consideration of the changes in distribution of the city's population as per the 2016 census. The most significant changes were the elimination of the St. Charles ward and the creation of a new Waverley West ward.

The 15 wards are categorized into one of five community committees, which deal with local community issues. This includes:

- Assiniboia Community Committee
  - Charleswood–Tuxedo–Whyte Ridge (Charleswood–Tuxedo before 1 March 2015)
  - Waverley West
  - St. James–Brooklands–Weston (St. James–Brooklands before 1 March 2015; St. James before 1 April 2003)
- East Kildonan–Transcona Community Committee
  - Elmwood–East Kildonan
  - North Kildonan
  - Transcona
- City Centre
  - Daniel McIntyre
  - Fort Rouge–East Fort Garry (Fort Rouge before April 1, 2003)
  - River Heights–Fort Garry
- Lord Selkirk–West Kildonan Community Committee
  - Mynarski
  - Old Kildonan
  - Point Douglas
- Riel
  - St. Boniface
  - St. Norbert–Seine River
  - St. Vital

== Community areas and neighbourhood clusters ==
The City of Winnipeg has been subdivided into two levels of areas, or relative segments, developed by the Community Data Program of the national Canadian Community Economic Development Network, in partnership with the federal and provincial governments and local community organizations.

Community areas are the broader, less detailed level of areas, which allow for geographical analysis and comparisons, i.e. census data, as used by Statistics Canada. As of the 2016 census, Winnipeg is composed of 12 community areas. There is also a separate set of 72 community centre areas, defining the catchment areas of community centres.

Community areas are composed of the second level of areas, neighbourhood clusters (formerly "Neighbourhood Resource Networks" or NRN), which are used for planning and policy purposes by Manitoba Health and the Winnipeg Regional Health Authority (WRHA). As of the 2016 census, there are 23 neighbourhood clusters, composing the Winnipeg census division.

The neighbourhood clusters are in turn subdivided into the same 230 neighbourhoods that make up the city wards of Winnipeg. Many of these clusters, community areas, and neighbourhoods share names and locations with the wards; however, ward boundaries and neighbourhood boundaries do not always perfectly align with one another (For example, the St. James-Assiniboia community area extends further west but lesser east than the St. James ward).

Community areas and neighbourhood clusters of Winnipeg, 2016
Community area	Neighbourhood cluster(s)	Neighbourhoods
Assiniboine South	Assiniboine South	Betsworth; Edgeland; Elmhurst; Eric Coy; Marlton; Old Tuxedo; Ridgedale; Ridgewood South; River West Park; Roblin Park; South Tuxedo; Southboine; Tuxedo; Tuxedo Industrial; Varsity View; Vialoux; Westdale; West Perimeter South; Wilkes South
Downtown	Downtown East	Armstrong's Point; Broadway–Assiniboine; Centennial; Central Park; Chinatown; Civic Centre; Colony; Exchange District; The Forks; Logan–CPR; Portage–Ellice; Portage & Main; South Portage; Spence; West Alexander; West Broadway
Downtown	Downtown West	Daniel McIntyre; Minto; Polo Park; Sargent Park; St. Matthews; West Wolseley; Wolseley
Fort Garry	Fort Garry North	Beaumont; Brockville; Buffalo; Crescent Park; Linden Ridge; Linden Woods; Maybank; Parker; Pembina Strip; Point Road; West Fort Garry Industrial; Whyte Ridge; Wildwood
Fort Garry	Fort Garry South	Agassiz; Bridgwater Centre; Bridgwater Forest; Bridgwater Lakes; Bridgwater Trails; Cloutier Drive; Fairfield Park; Fort Richmond; La Barriere; Montcalm; Parc La Salle; Perrault; Richmond Lakes; Richmond West; South Pointe; St. Norbert; Trappistes; Turnbull Drive; University; Waverley Heights; Waverly West B
Inkster	Inkster East	Brooklands; Burrows–Keewatin; Inkster Industrial Park; Pacific Industrial; Shaughnessy Park; Weston; Weston Shops
Inkster	Inkster West	Inkster Gardens; North Inkster Industrial; Oak Point Highway; Tyndall Park
Point Douglas	Point Douglas North	Burrows Central; Inkster–Faraday; Luxton; Mynarski; Robertson; St. John's; St. John's Park
Point Douglas	Point Douglas South	Dufferin; Dufferin Industrial; Lord Selkirk Park; North Point Douglas; South Point Douglas; William Whyte
River East	River East East	Eaglemere; Grassie; Kil-cona Park; Kildonan Crossing; McLeod Industrial; Munroe East; North Transcona Yards; Springfield North; Springfield South; Valley Gardens
River East	River East South	Chalmers; East Elmwood; Glenelm; Talbot–Grey; Tyne-Tees
River East	River East West	Kildonan Drive; Munroe West; River East; Rossmere–A; Rossmere–B; Valhalla
River Heights	River Heights East	Lord Roberts; McMillan; River-Osborne; Riverview; Roslyn
River Heights	River Heights West	Central River Heights; Crescentwood; Earl Grey; Ebby–Wentworth; Grant Park; J.B. Mitchell; Mathers; North River Heights; Rockwood; Sir John Franklin; South River Heights; Wellington Crescent
Seven Oaks	Seven Oaks East	Garden City; Jefferson; Leila North; Leila–McPhillips Triangle; Margaret Park; Riverbend; Rivergrove; Seven Oaks; Templeton–Sinclair; West Kildonan Industrial
Seven Oaks	Seven Oaks West	Amber Trails; Mandalay West; Rosser–Old Kildonan; The Maples
St. Boniface	St. Boniface East	Archwood; Dufresne; Dugald; Fraipont; Holden; Island Lakes; Maginot; The Mint; Mission Industrial; Niakwa Park; Niakwa Place; Royalwood; Sage Creek; Southdale; Southland Park; St. Boniface Industrial Park; Stock Yards; Symington Yards; Tissot; Windsor Park
St. Boniface	St. Boniface West	Central St. Boniface; North St. Boniface; Norwood East; Norwood West
St. James–Assiniboia	St. James-Assiniboia East	Airport; Birchwood; Booth; Bruce Park; Deer Lodge; Jameswood; Kensington; King Edward; Murray Industrial Park; Omand's Creek Industrial; Silver Heights; St. James Industrial; Woodhaven
St. James–Assiniboia	St. James-Assiniboia West	Assiniboia Downs; Buchanan; Crestview; Glendale; Heritage Park; Kirkfield; Saskatchewan North; Sturgeon Creek; Westwood
St. Vital	St. Vital North	Alpine Place; Elm Park; Glenwood; Kingston Crescent; Lavalee; Norberry; Pulberry; St. George; Varennes; Victoria Crescent; Worthington
St. Vital	St. Vital South	Dakota Crossing; Maple Grove Park; Meadowood; Minnetonka; Normand Park; River Park South; St. Vital Perimeter South; Vista
Transcona	Transcona	Canterbury Park; Griffin; Kern Park; Kildare–Redonda; Meadows; Melrose; Mission Gardens; Peguis; Radisson; Regent; Transcona South; Transcona Yards; Victoria West

For health planning, the WRHA also includes two relatively densely-populated rural municipalities that are located outside of Winnipeg: the RM of East St. Paul is included in River East, and West St. Paul in Seven Oaks.

== Downtown and Inner City ==
The Inner City was defined for planning purposes in the 1980s by the three-government Core Area Initiative.

Within the Inner City, the Downtown Winnipeg Zoning By-Law defines an area for regulation of downtown development, significantly smaller than the Downtown community area.

The Exchange District is a National Historic Site of Canada.

== School divisions ==
Winnipeg is divided into school divisions, further subdivided into wards represented by several school trustees.

- Louis Riel School Division
- Pembina Trails School Division
- River East Transcona School Division
- Seven Oaks School Division
- St. James–Assiniboia School Division
- Winnipeg School Division

== Census subdivisions ==
The city is contained in the Winnipeg census metropolitan area (CMA), including several other municipalities, and the smaller Winnipeg census division, which also includes the town of Headingley. The city itself is designated subdivision 11 040, further broken down into census tracts and, in turn, into dissemination areas.

== Unicity ==
Today's Winnipeg is the product of the City of Winnipeg Act of 1972, which incorporated a number of cities, towns, and rural municipalities into a single larger city (previously administered under the Metropolitan Corporation of Greater Winnipeg, since 1960) into an amalgamated unicity. Residents still refer to these historical communities:

- Charleswood (rural municipality)
- East Kildonan (city)
- Fort Garry (R.M.)
- Headingley (R.M., seceded from Unicity in 1993)
- North Kildonan (R.M.)
- Old Kildonan (R.M.)
- St. Boniface (city)
- St. James–Assiniboia (city)
- St. Vital (city)
- Transcona (city)
- Tuxedo (town)
- West Kildonan (city)
- Winnipeg (city)
