= St. Vital Historical Society =

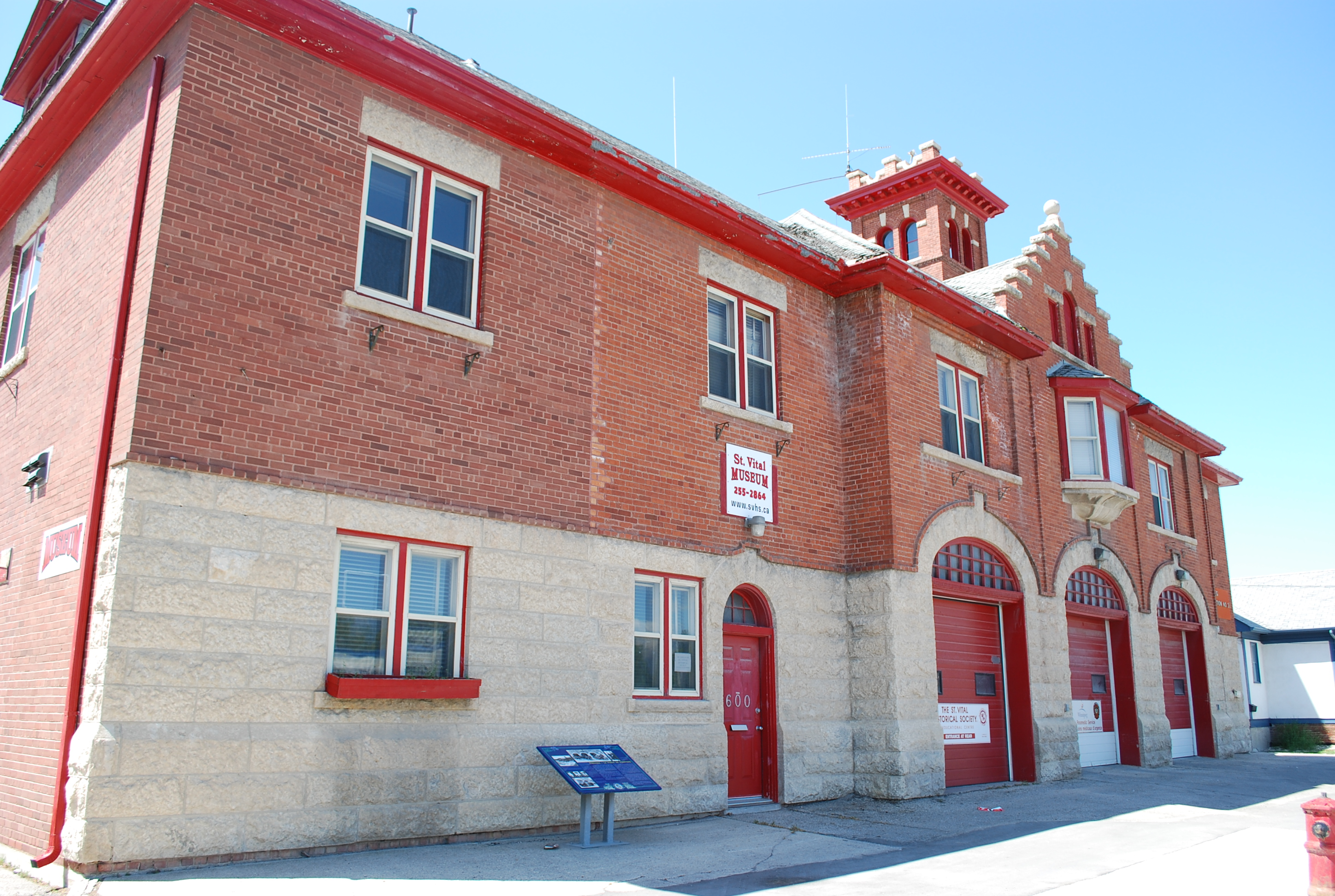
- St. Vital Fire Hall
- Established: September 1994
- Coordinates: 49°51′49.0″N 97°06′41.7″W
- Type: historical society
- President: Bob Holliday
- Curator: Assorted
- Public transit access: 14 Ellice-St. Mary's; 55 St. Anne's
- Website: www.svhs.ca

The St. Vital Historical Society is the non-profit organization that operates the St. Vital Museum, a civic museum dedicated to the former City of St. Vital, now a ward of Winnipeg, Manitoba.

Located at 600 St. Mary's Road, the 2-storey building is a fire hall built in 1914 that housed both the St. Vital Police and Fire Departments. The fire hall was designated as a heritage building in 1982, the Historical Society was established in 1994, and the museum was officially opened on 24 May 2008.

The main attraction is a fire truck from 1939. The museum also features exhibits on local history including early settlers, Métis history, military history, the 1950 Red River Flood, and local musicians. The successful Winnipeg-based rock band The Guess Who donated a collection of master tapes and videos from their long history in 2018. A large doll collection donated by local residents is also on display. It is open Tuesday to Saturday from 10 to 4 with winter hours on Saturday only.

The Museum is affiliated with: CMA, CHIN, and Virtual Museum of Canada.
