= Winnipeg Flood =

Winnipeg Flood may refer to:

- 1950 Red River flood
- 1997 Red River flood
