= Vialoux =

Neighbourhood in Manitoba, Canada

- Neighbourhood
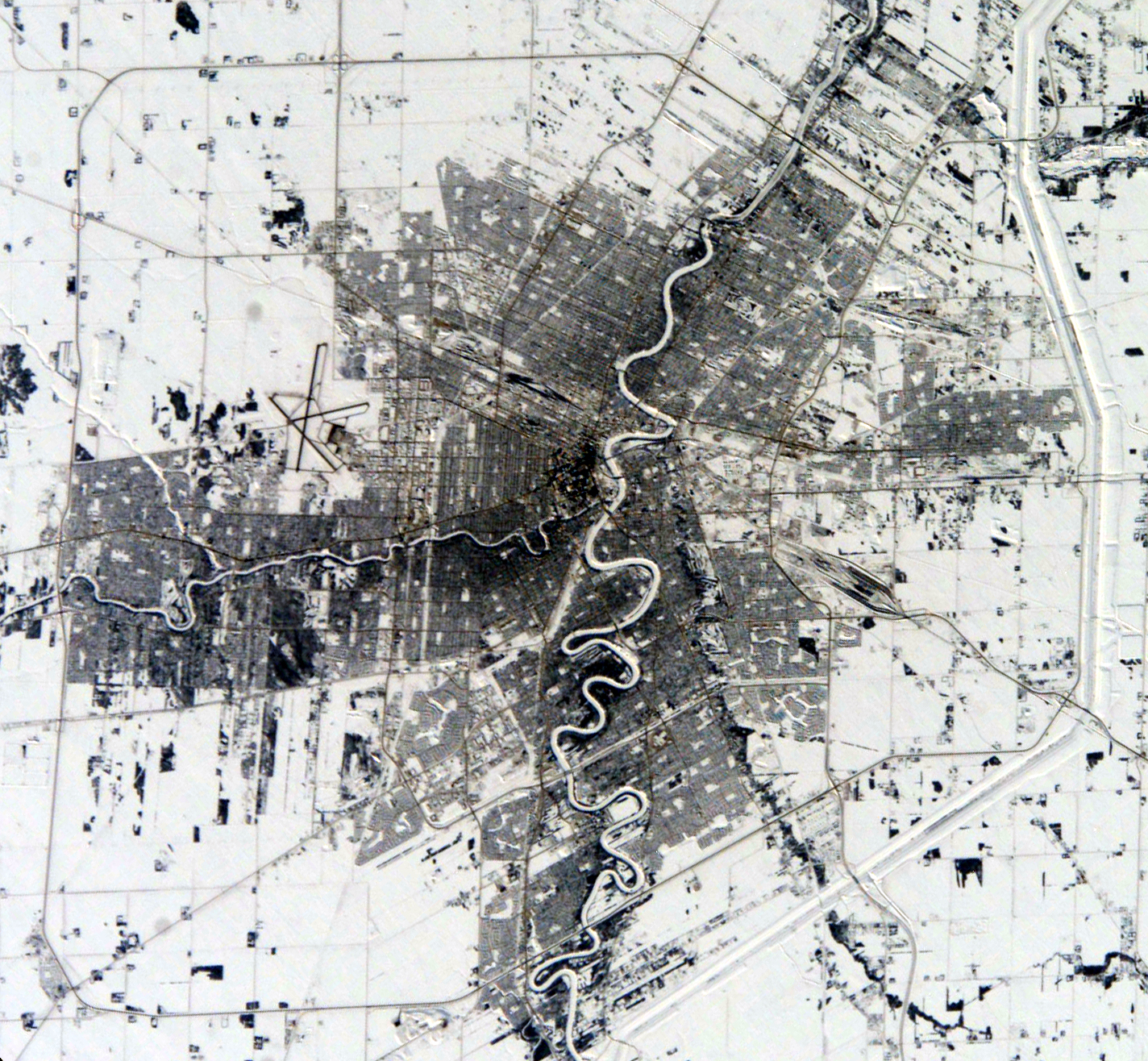
- Location within Winnipeg
- Coordinates: 49°52′13″N 97°15′23″W
- Country: Canada
- Province: Manitoba
- City: Winnipeg

Population
  - Total: 950
  - Density: 1,720.4/km^{2} (4,456/sq mi)
- Forward Sortation Area: R3R

Vialoux is a residential suburban neighbourhood in Charleswood, Winnipeg. It is bordered by the Assiniboine River to the North, Assiniboine Park to the East, Roblin Boulevard to the South, and the Charleswood Parkway to the West.

Vialoux is part of the Assiniboine South Neighbourhood Cluster. It is part of the Winnipeg electoral ward of Charleswood - Tuxedo - Westwood, the provincial electoral district of Tuxedo and the federal riding of Charleswood—St. James—Assiniboia—Headingley.

== Etymology ==
Vialoux is named after Vialoux Drive.

== Demographics ==
The neighbourhood is predominantly white, middle class and anglophone. According to the 2016 Census, the neighbourhood is 91.5% Anglophone. The neighbourhood is majority white, with the largest non-white ethnic groups being Indigenous or Metis (7.9%) and the remaining 8.4% of residents belonging to other visible minorities.

The average income for the neighbourhood is $51,198 which is higher than the city average of $44,915.

Vialoux has a mix of single family homes and high density housing. Half of the residents rent and the other half own their dwellings.

== Amenities ==
Vialoux is home to Smithdale Park and borders Assiniboine Park.

From 1996 to 2021, Vialoux was home to the Assiniboine Valley Railway a private ridable miniature railway on a 7-acre property bordering Assiniboine Park. The Assiniboine Valley Railway Club offered rides to the public weekend afternoons through June–October. The club also hosted events in September and gave special Christmas Lights tours in December. In 2021, the railway was asked to vacate the property.

== See also ==
- Subdivisions of Winnipeg
- List of Neighbourhoods in Winnipeg
