= Notre Dame (electoral district) =

Provincial electoral district in Manitoba, Canada

Manitoba electoral district
- Location in Winnipeg

Provincial electoral district
- Legislature: Legislative Assembly of Manitoba
MLA
Malaya Marcelino
New Democratic
- District created: 2018
- First contested: 2019
- Last contested: 2023

Demographics
- Population (2016): 22,880
- Census division: Division No. 11
- Census subdivision: Winnipeg

Notre Dame is a provincial electoral district of Manitoba, Canada, that was first contested in the 2019 Manitoba general election. Malaya Marcelino was elected the first member to the Legislative Assembly of Manitoba for the riding.

The riding was created by the 2018 provincial redistribution out of parts of Tyndall Park, Minto, and Logan.

The riding contains the Winnipeg neighbourhoods of Brooklands, Weston, and parts of West Alexander, Logan-C.P.R., Centennial, Daniel McIntyre, and Sargeant Park.

The riding is named for Notre Dame Avenue, a local stretch of Winnipeg Route 57.

== Members of the Legislative Assembly ==
Name	Party	Took office	Left office
Malaya Marcelino	New Democrat	2019	

== Election results ==
2023 Manitoba general election
Party	Candidate	Votes	%	±%	Expenditures
New Democratic	Malaya Marcelino	3,832	75.58	+10.63	$18,176.41
Progressive Conservative	Mufarrah Waheed	732	14.44	-0.81	$0.00
Liberal	Winston Wuttunee	319	6.29	-7.27	$0.00
Green	Micah Dewey	105	2.07	-3.01	$664.62
Communist	Andrew Taylor	82	1.62	+1.00	$106.40
Total valid votes/expense limit		5,070	99.59	–	$52,357.00
Total rejected and declined ballots		21	0.41	–	
Turnout		5,091	37.88	-2.98	
Eligible voters		13,439			
New Democratic hold		Swing		+5.72	
Source(s) Source: Elections Manitoba

2019 Manitoba general election
Party	Candidate	Votes	%	±%	Expenditures
New Democratic	Malaya Marcelino	3,361	64.95	+20.1	$14,607.43
Progressive Conservative	Marsha Street	789	15.25	-4.7	$521.28
Liberal	Donovan Martin	702	13.57	-8.6	$4,041.34
Green	Martha Jo Willard	263	5.08	-1.7	$494.13
Communist	Andrew Taylor	32	0.62		$310.80
Manitoba Forward	Margaret Sturby	28	0.54		$0.00
Total valid votes		5,175	100.0		
Total rejected ballots					
Turnout			43.5		
Eligible voters					
New Democratic hold		Swing		+12.4	

2016 provincial election redistributed results
Party	%
New Democratic	44.8
Liberal	22.2
Progressive Conservative	19.9
Green	6.8
Others	6.3

== See also ==
- List of Manitoba provincial electoral districts
- Canadian provincial electoral districts
