= Winnipeg Rifles =

Canadian football team

Logo

General information
- Founded: 1999
- Stadium: Maple Grove Park
- Headquartered: Winnipeg, Manitoba
- Colours: Black, navy blue, gold, silver
- Website: Official website

Personnel
- General manager: Laurie Hoel
- Head coach: Geordie Wilson

League / conference affiliations
- Canadian Junior Football League; Prairie Football Conference

The Winnipeg Rifles are a Canadian football team based in Winnipeg, Manitoba.

The Rifles are members of the Canadian Junior Football League in the Prairie Football Conference and play their home games in Maple Grove Park in Winnipeg, Manitoba.

The team is named after the Royal Winnipeg Rifles Regiment which was founded in 1883 in Winnipeg, Manitoba.

== History ==
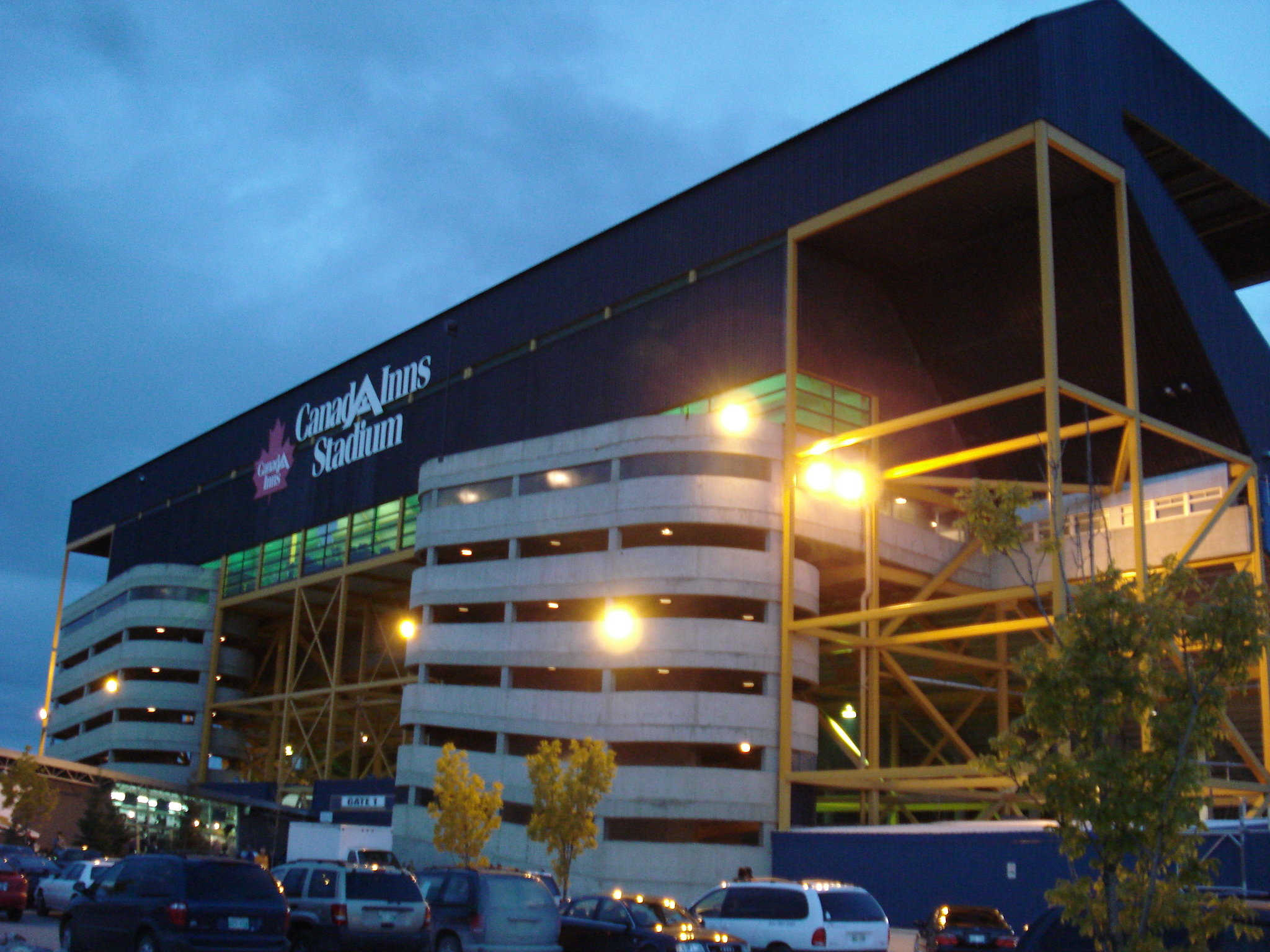
Canad Inns Stadium, where the Rifles played until 2012

Junior football in Winnipeg dates back to the 1920s, with the formation of the Manitoba Junior Football League.

In 1953, teams from Winnipeg began playing in the CJFL. The most successful team being the Winnipeg Rods, who won three championships. Those teams would eventually fold or merge. The Winnipeg Hawkeyes were the last Winnipeg based team prior to the Rifles, folding in 1996.

In 1999, an effort to bring back a team to Winnipeg was headed by James Ladd (Manitoba Football Hall of Fame inductee). The team began play in the CJFL in 2002, playing out of Canad Inns Stadium. From 2013 to 2019, the Rifles began to play out of Princess Auto Stadium. As of the 2021 season, home games are played at Maple Grove Rugby Park in St. Vital, Winnipeg, Manitoba.

== Winnipeg Rifles Record since 2016 ==
Since Geordie Wilson's takeover of the program in 2016; the Winnipeg Rifles have a 26-55 regular season win-losses record and a playoff losing streak of a 0-5 record*.

- 2016 - 2–7
- 2017 - 4-4 (1st round playoff loss 28–21 to the Saskatoon Hilltops)*
- 2018 - 3-5 (1st round playoff loss 58–5 to the Saskatoon Hilltops)
- 2019 - 1-7
- 2020 - SEASON CANCELLED (DUE TO THE COVID-19 PANDEMIC)
- 2021 - 2-6 (1st round playoff loss 45–26 to the Regina Thunder)
- 2022 - 4-4 (1st round playoff loss 23–14 to the Regina Thunder)
- 2023 - 2-6
- 2024 - 1-7
- 2025 - 4-4 (1st round playoff loss 60–26 to Saskatoon Hilltops)
- 2026 - 3-5

== Coaches (as of 2026) ==
Offensive Coaches	Name
Head Coach	Geordie Wilson
Offensive Coordinator	March Burnett Joseph
Quarterback Coach	Bryson McNeil
Receivers Coach	Brendan Naujoks
Offensive Line Coach	Nathan Weichel
Asst. Running Back Coach	Carson Cadieux
Asst. Offensive Line Coach	Jackson Haime
Special Teams Coaches	Name
Special Teams Coordinator	Craig Bachynski
Defensive Coaches	Name
Defensive Coordinator	Justin Kasak
Linebacker Coach	Zach Wood
Defensive Back Coach	Brett McFarlane
Defensive Line Coach	Kent Wood
Asst. Defensive Line Coach	Riley Kolodie
Asst. Defensive Back Coach	Keyshawn Gaskin

== Games ==
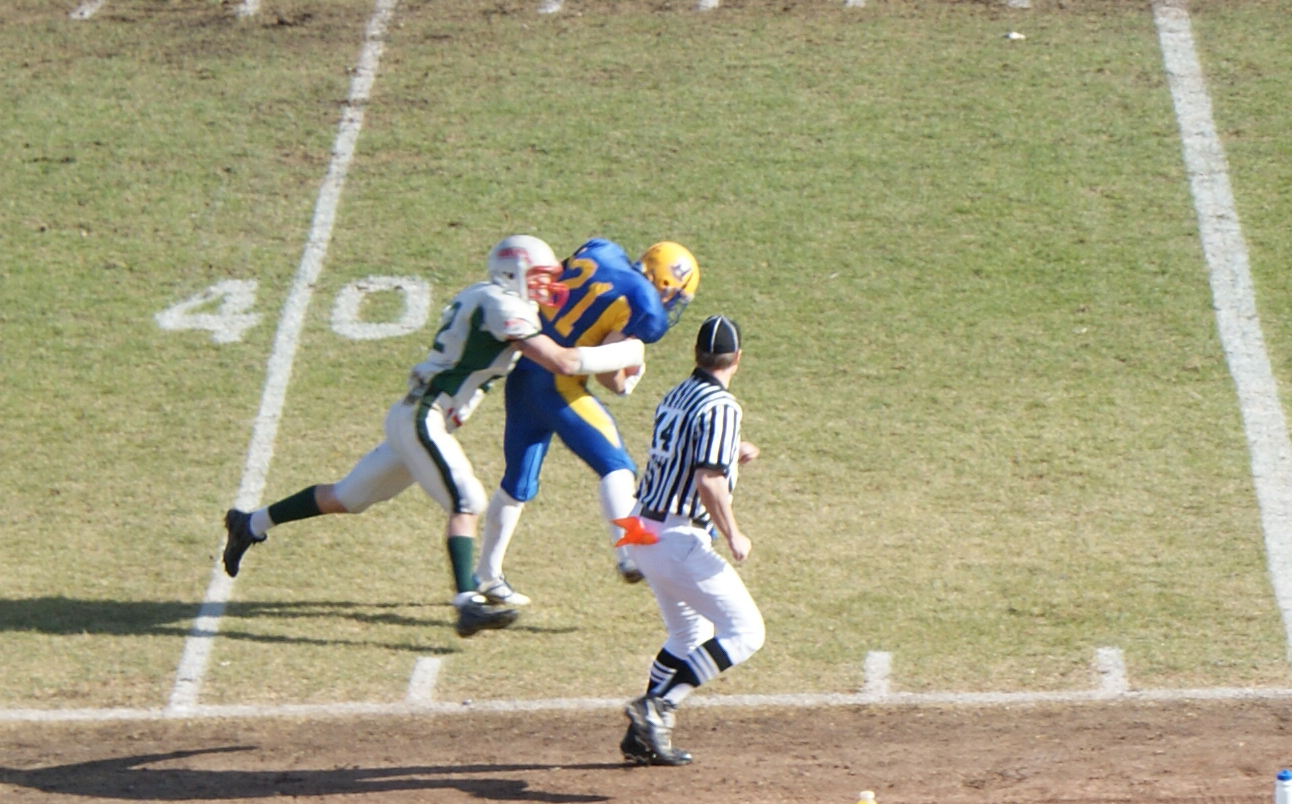
Saskatoon Hilltops-Rifles playoff game on October 10, 2008

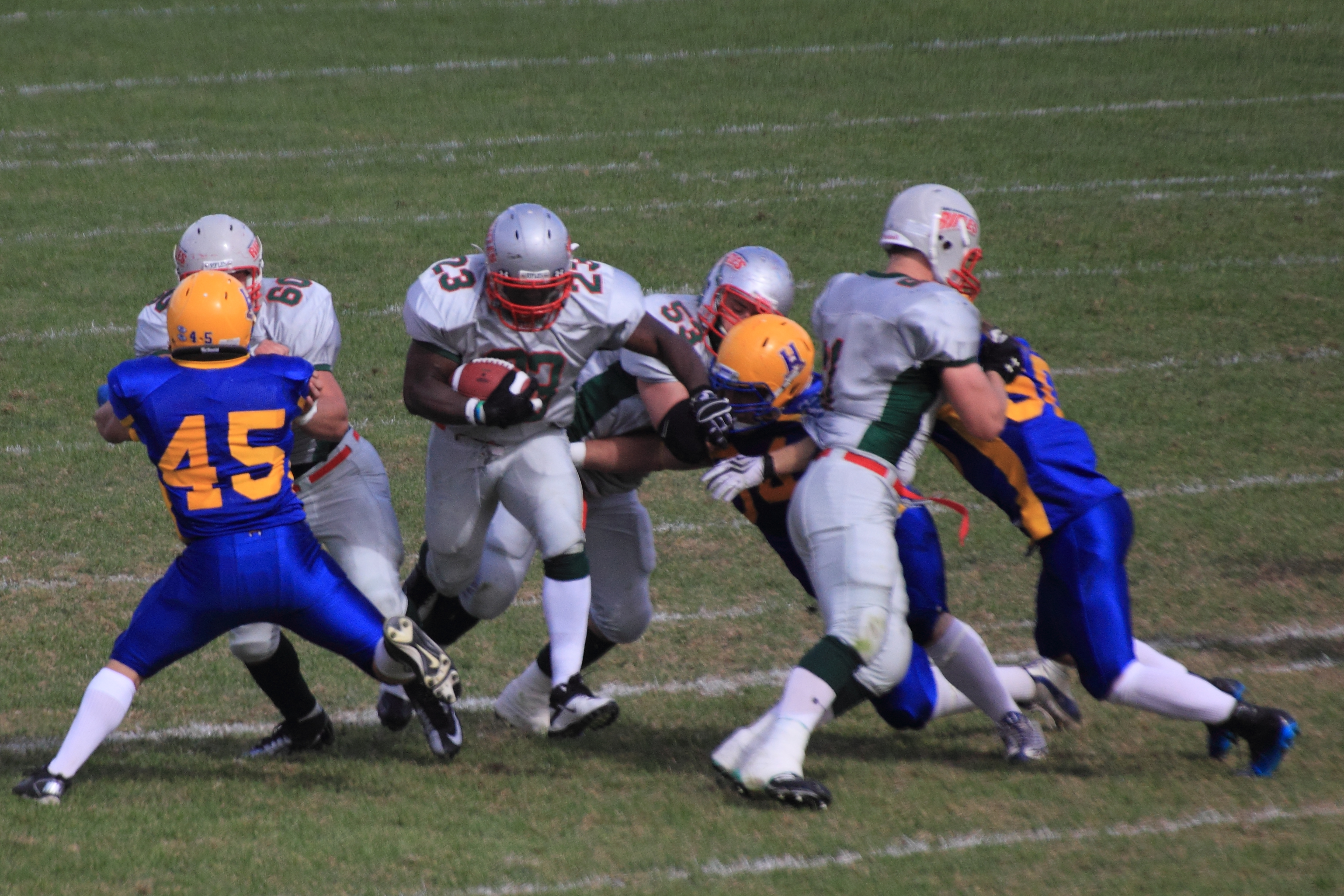
Rifles 9 Hilltops 43 on September 19, 2012

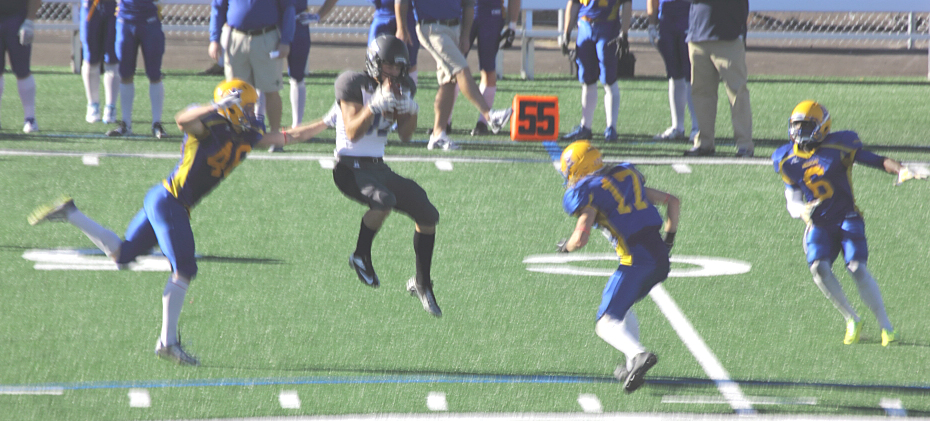
Winnipeg Rifles 13 - 43 Saskatoon Hilltops, Playoff game on October 19, 2014, at the Saskatoon Minor Football Field

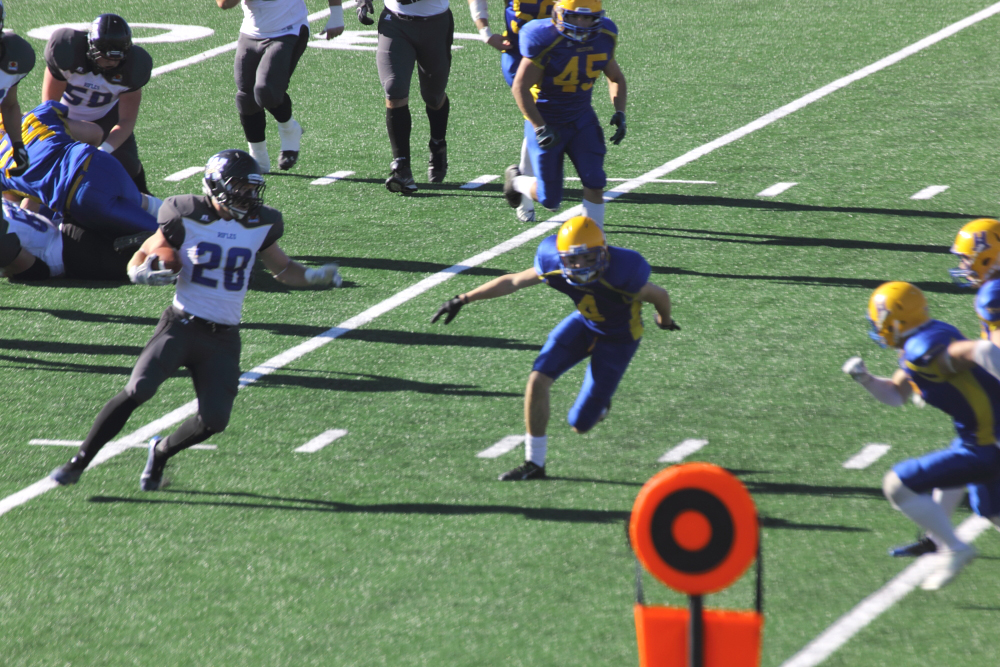
Defensive Back Cam Penner of the Winnipeg Rifles
