= King's Park, Winnipeg =

Park and neighborhood in Winnipeg, Canada

Kings Park
- Interactive map of Kings Park
- Location: Fort Richmond
- Coordinates: 49.798°N 97.123°W
- Area: 37.4 hectares (92 acres)
- Elevation: 231 metres (758 ft)
- Public transit: Winnipeg Transit; 662 671 672

Kings Park is a 92 acres (37.4 ha) park and residential subdivision in Fort Richmond, a suburb of Fort Garry in southern Winnipeg, located on the western side of the Red River. Its grounds include Chinese pagoda gardens in the centre of the park, a soccer field, two baseball diamonds, an off leash dog park area and marshland, home of waterfowl and wildlife.

== History ==
=== Neighbourhood ===
Kings Park began in the early 20th century, located 240 yards (220 m) from the newly created University of Manitoba Agricultural College and Connaught Park. Having the University of Manitoba nearby increased the land value from $125.00 to $4,000 per acre. Adjacent to the park, 124 treed lots were subdivided for housing.

Electric streetcar service was planned early on, to serve both the Park and the Agricultural College.

The subdivision has the Kings Park Community Club. Originally activities took place at St. Avila School until a separate building could be built.

=== Park ===
The 92 acres (37.4 ha) park features two baseball diamonds, an off leash dog walk, football and soccer fields, Chinese pagoda, 6.9 acres (2.8 ha) lake including a waterfall,
