= St. Vital =

Suburban neighbourhood in Winnipeg, Manitoba, Canada

St. Vital Saint-Vital
- Suburb
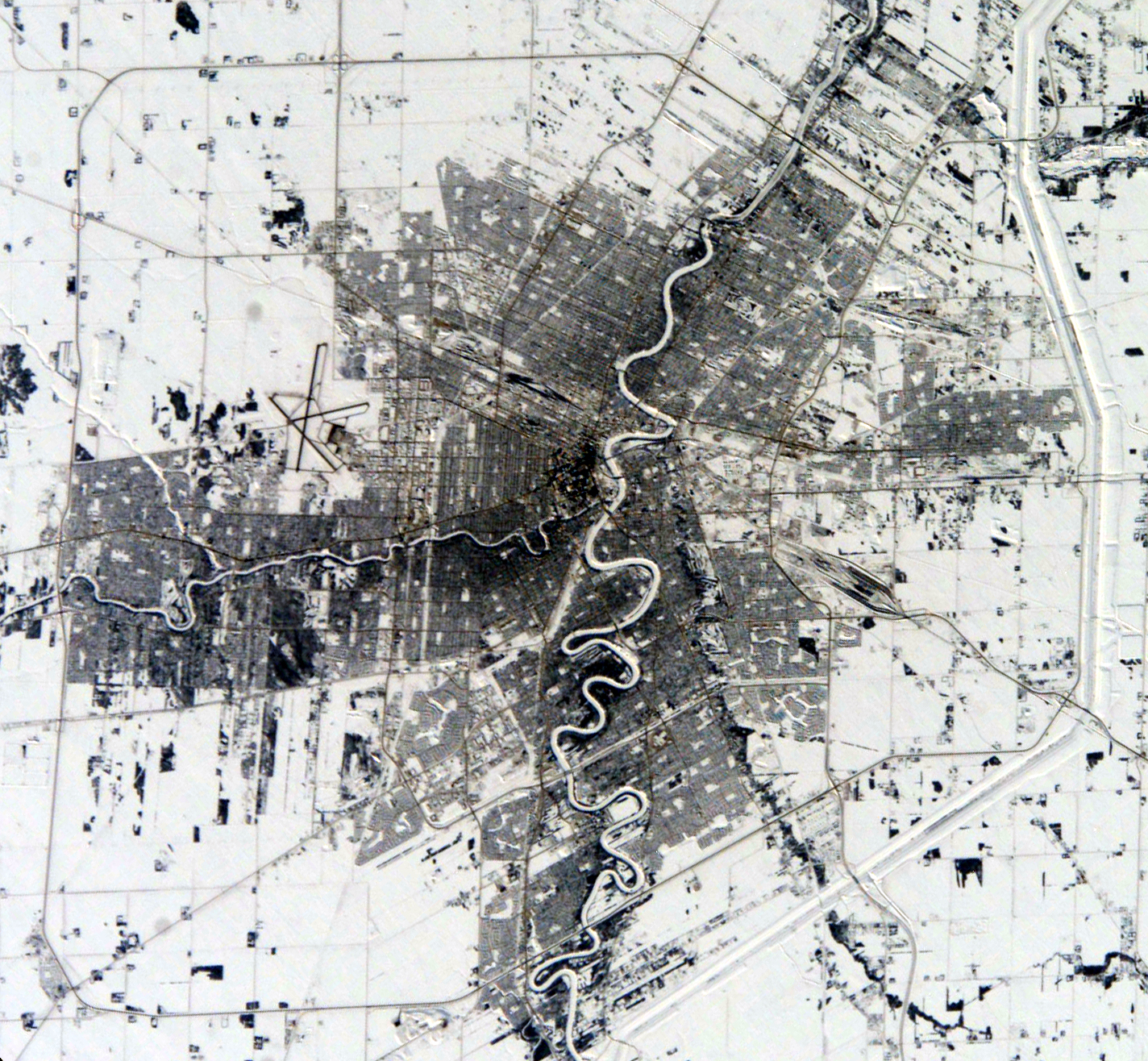
- Location within Winnipeg
- Coordinates: 49°51′47″N 97°06′35″W
- Country: Canada
- Province: Manitoba
- City: Winnipeg
- Settled: 1822
- Established: 1880
- Incorporated as a city: 1962 June 9
- Merged into Unicity: 1972
- Named for: Saint Vitalis of Milan (patron saint of Vital-Justin Grandin)
- Neighbourhoods: Alpine Place; Elm Park; Glenwood; Kingston Crescent; Lavalee; Meadowood; Minnetonka; Norberry; Normand Park; Pulberry; River Park South; Dakota Crossing; St. George; St. Vital Centre; Varennes; Victoria Crescent; Vista; Worthington

Government
  - MP: Ginette Lavack
  - MLA: Jamie Moses
  - Councillor: Brian Mayes

Area
  - Suburb: 63.3 km^{2} (24.4 sq mi)
  - Metro: 5,306.79 km^{2} (2,048.96 sq mi)

Population (2016)^{[1]}
  - Suburb: 67,580
  - Density: 1,070/km^{2} (2,770/sq mi)
  - Metro: 778,489
- Time zone: UTC-6 (CST)
  - Summer (DST): UTC-5 (CDT)
- Forward Sortation Areas: R2M, R2N
- Area codes: 204, 431
- Major streets: Abinojii Mikanah; Fermor Ave; Dunkirk Dr; St. Anne's Rd; St. Mary's Rd
- Notable places: Elm Park Bridge; Maple Grove Park; Riel House; St. Vital Centre; St. Vital Museum; St. Vital Park

St. Vital (French: Saint-Vital) is a ward and neighbourhood of Winnipeg, Manitoba, Canada.

Located in the south-central part of the city, it is bounded on the north by Carrière Avenue; on the south by the northern limit of the Rural Municipality of Ritchot; on the west by the Red River; and on the east by the Seine River, except for the part lying south of the Perimeter Highway, which extends east across the Seine to the boundary of the RM of Springfield. The population as of the 2016 census was 67,580.

Merging with Winnipeg in 1972, St. Vital was established in 1880 as a rural municipality, called the RM of St. Boniface. After the Town of Saint Boniface was formed in 1883, the RM continued operating as its own government, and was renamed to the Rural Municipality of St. Vital in 1903 to avoid confusion. In 1960, it became part of the Metropolitan Corporation of Greater Winnipeg, achieving city status soon after in 1962 until the Winnipeg merger.

As a city ward, St. Vital is represented by a member of Winnipeg City Council. With slightly different boundaries, it also comprises the Winnipeg neighbourhood clusters of St. Vital North and St. Vital South.

== History ==
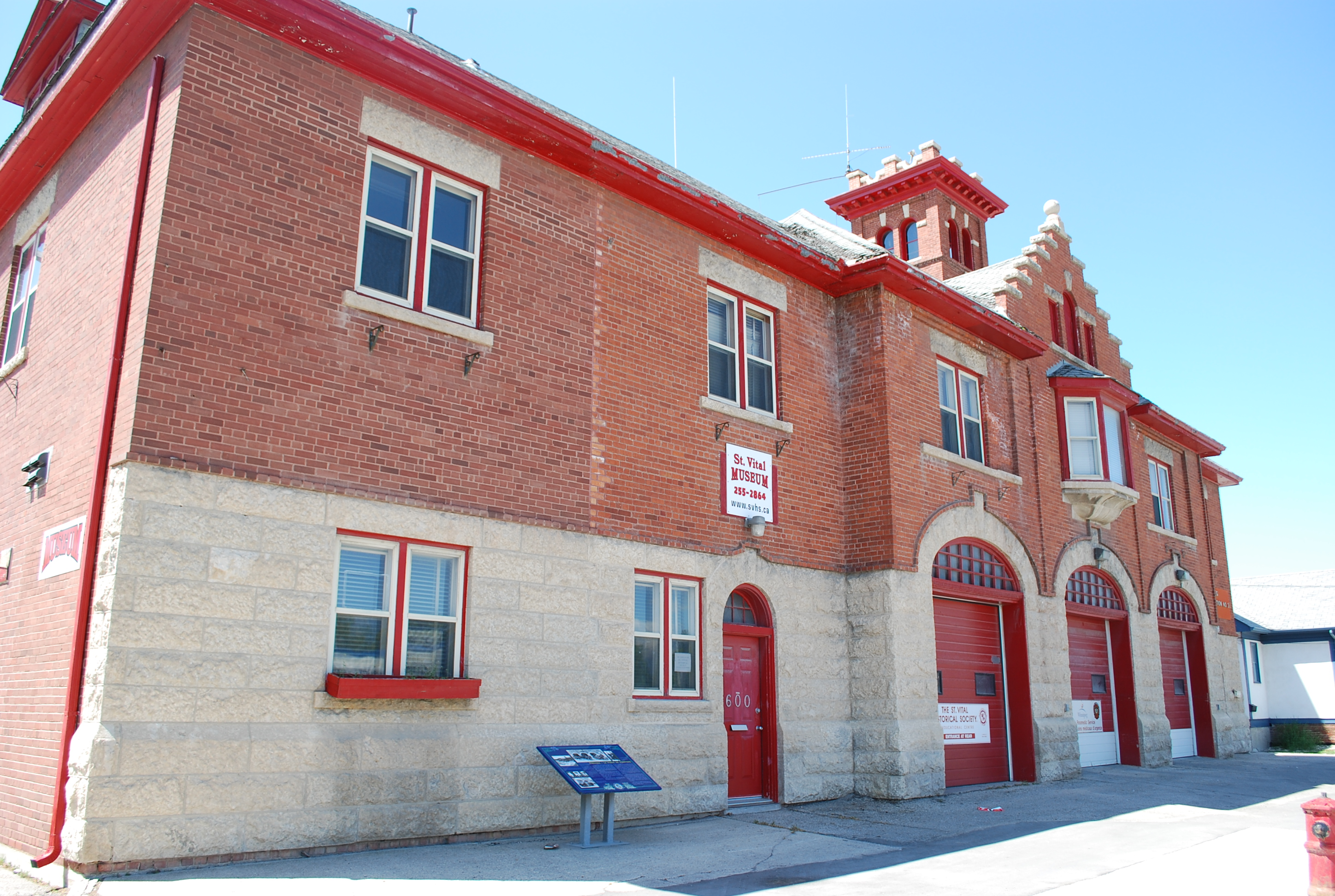
St. Vital Fire Hall in Elm Park sheltered evacuees during the 1950 Red River Flood. It is still in use as an ambulance station and as a museum.

The community was established by francophone settlers in 1822, and is the second-oldest permanent settlement in Manitoba after Kildonan. This community was named St. Vital by Archbishop Taché in 1860, in honour of the patron saint of his colleague, Father Vital-Justin Grandin.

The community became established in 1880 as a rural municipality, called the Rural Municipality of St. Boniface. After the Town of Saint Boniface was formed in 1883, the RM continued operating as its own government, and was renamed to the Rural Municipality of St. Vital in 1903 to avoid confusion.

From 1891, the municipality underwent a series of boundary changes, wherein it was reduced to the east and extended in the west and south. In 1912, the community on the west side of the Red River separated to form the RM of Fort Garry; in 1914, a large tract of land was annexed to the City of St. Boniface and land annexed from the RM of Ritchot. It was bounded on the west and east by the Red and Seine Rivers, Carriere Avenue on the north and Grande Pointe on the south.

The municipality included parts of the Parishes of St. Boniface, St. Vital, and St. Norbert. The original Parish of St. Vital existed in present-day St. Vital in addition to much of Fort Garry, another present-day suburb on the west side of the Red River. It began in 1861 when Bishop Taché, on the east side of the Red River, built a small schoolhouse inside which a small chapel was built. The parish was home to many French-speaking settlers, particularly Métis.

St. Vital remained a strongly francophone community in the early decades after Manitoba's incorporation as a Canadian province in 1870, with every reeve and councillor being of a francophone background until 1910. The anglophone population grew throughout this period, however: in 1912, Richard Wilson was elected as St. Vital's first anglophone reeve, and after 1913, Council business was conducted in English. The municipal government became more pro-business after this period, and supported municipal expansion.

From 1920 to 1958, St. Vital was part of the provincial electoral division of St. Boniface. In 1923, St. Vital adopted the single transferable voting system for its municipal elections, using this system until 1972. Between 1925 and 1927, the municipality lost its mandate to govern, when the Winnipeg Suburban Municipal Board stepped in due to financial difficulties. Moreover, with less than 10,000 people in the area, the municipality faced bankruptcy in 1926, as municipal growth outstripped tax revenues. Control of the municipality was assumed by the provincial government's Municipal and Public Utilities Board for one year.

In 1950, the district was seriously affected by the Red River flood, with the entire developed area of St. Vital being under water at one point. The neighbourhoods of Kingston Crescent and Elm Park were the hardest hit. The fire hall in Elm Park was protected with sandbags and sheltered dozens of evacuees, as shown in a photo published in the 1 May 1950 edition of Life magazine.

In 1960, St. Vital became part of the Metropolitan Corporation of Greater Winnipeg, achieving city status soon after on 9 June 1962 with the passing of An Act to provide a Charter for the City of St. Vital. The city became involved in a school controversy in 1963–64, when six francophone families took their children out of school to protest bus fees for parochial school students. The matter was resolved following a 3-month standoff.

Map showing the former boundaries of the City of St. Vital.

In 1972, the City of St. Vital and several other municipalities merged with Winnipeg as part of the Unicity project laid out in the 1971 City of Winnipeg Act, whereupon it became a ward of the city and moved to first-past-the-post voting. Some residents were reluctant to amalgamate with Winnipeg, and the former municipal government held a mock burial of the city crest.

=== Former reeves and mayors ===
Prior to its amalgamation into Winnipeg in 1972, St. Vital was led by a reeve or mayor.

Term	Reeve/mayor
Rural Municipality
1882–88	Victor Magar (1849–1930)
1888–91	Simon Trudeau
1891	Joseph Riel (1858–1921)
1892	Pierre Dumas
1893–94	Joseph Riel (1858–1921)
1895–1903	Victor Mager
1904–10	Pierre Dumas
1911–12	Victor Mager
1913–17	Richard Wilson
1918–20	Alexander Tod
1921–22	James Barton
1923–24	John Cowan Kelly (c. 1875-1960)
1924	Herbert C. Seagram (acting)
1924	F. W. Hack (acting)
1925–27	Herbert C. Seagram
1928–30	Leoni St. Clairze "Leo" Warde (1888–1971)
1931–32	H. G. Wyatt
1933–37	George Elsey
1938–41	Austin Lloyd Clark (1896–1945)
1942–45	James Davis Van Iderstine (1896–1980)
1946–49	A. H. Leech
1950–51	Elswood Fredrick Bole (1910–1987)
1952–59	Henry Southwood "Harry" Paul (1890–1969)
1960–61	Fred Brennan
City
1962–66	Harry Collins
1967–70	Jackson Alexander "Jack" Hardy (1924–2006)
1970–71	Arthur Alvin Winslow (1905–1987)

== Demographics ==
Federal census population history of St. Vital
Year	Pop.	±%
1871	300	—
1881	386	+28.7%
1891	251	−35.0%
1901	585	+133.1%
1906	987	+68.7%
1911	1,540	+56.0%
1916	1,844	+19.7%
1921	3,771	+104.5%
1926	7,785	+106.4%
1931	10,402	+33.6%
1936	11,377	+9.4%
1941	11,993	+5.4%
1946	14,674	+22.4%
1951	18,637	+27.0%
1956	23,672	+27.0%
1961	27,269	+15.2%
1966	29,528	+8.3%
1971	32,963	+11.6%
Source: Statistics Canada

Population history since amalgamation
Year	Pop.	±%
1971	32,500	—
1976	39,365	+21.1%
1981	43,620	+10.8%
1986	51,030	+17.0%
1991	57,395	+12.5%
1996	59,540	+3.7%
2001	59,840	+0.5%
2006	61,605	+2.9%
2011	65,330	+6.0%
2016	67,580	+3.4%

St. Vital remained a strongly francophone community in the early decades after Manitoba's incorporation as a Canadian province in 1870, with every reeve and councillor being of a francophone background until 1910.

St. Vital's population increased from only 1,800 at the end of World War I to 11,000 in 1933. By 1951, 63% of St. Vital's population was of British background, and the francophone population had fallen to under 13%. As of 2006, 17.4% of residents of St. Vital speak either both English and French or French only, while 82% speak English only and 0.6% speak neither English nor French.

== Places ==
=== Neighbourhoods ===
St. Vital includes many working- and middle-class neighbourhoods. Among them are Alpine Place, Elm Park, Glenwood, Lavalee, Norberry, St. George, Varennes, Worthington, Kingston Crescent, Minnetonka (also known as Riel), Pulberry, Victoria Crescent, Vista, St. Vital Centre, Sage Creek, Meadowood, Royalwood, and Fraipont.

Major streets in St. Vital include St. Mary's Road, St. Anne's Road, Abinojii Mikanah, Fermor Avenue (part of the Trans-Canada Highway), Novavista Drive, Warde Avenue, Beliveau Road, Meadowood Drive, Southglen Boulevard (including its eastern counterpart, Shorehill Drive), Aldgate Road, Des Meurons Street, Sage Creek Boulevard and Dunkirk Drive (and its southerly extension, Dakota Street).

=== Facilities ===
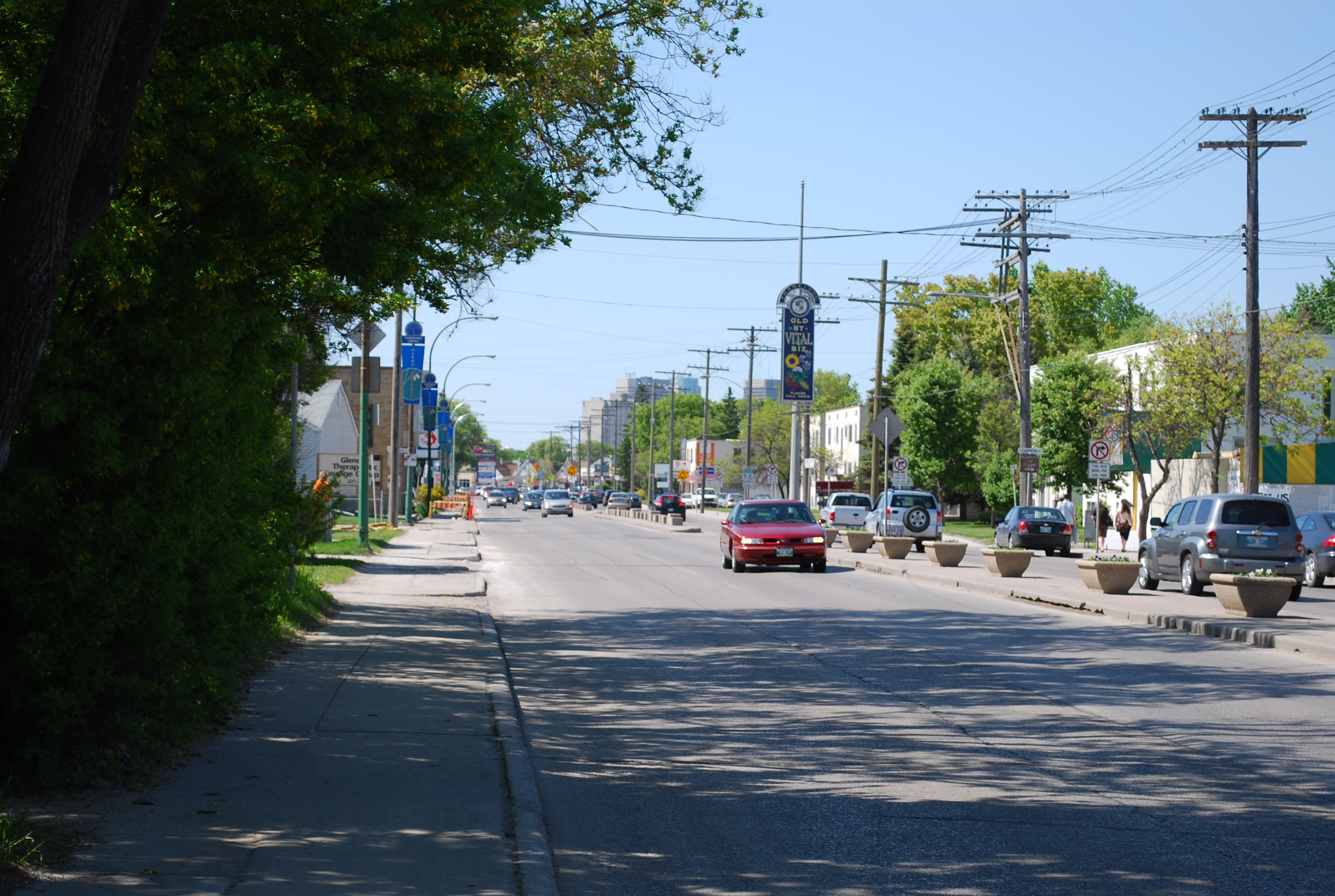
St. Mary's Road just south of Carriere Avenue, looking north toward downtown.

With the exception of a significant (though diminishing) semi-rural district in the south, St. Vital is almost entirely residential and has never been home to significant industrial or commercial enterprises, other than retail shops.

Among the area's main attractions are the St. Vital Museum, housed in the former residence of the St. Vital Police and Fire Departments; St. Vital Centre, a major regional shopping centre that opened in October 1979; and the National Historic Site of Riel House, consisting in the home of the family of Métis leader Louis Riel, restored to its 1886 condition.

Its parks include St. Vital Park, one of Winnipeg's largest city parks; Maple Grove Park, which is similar in size to St. Vital Park but more recently established; and Guay Park in north St. Vital, which contains a war memorial erected in honour of St. Vital residents killed in the two World Wars and in Korea. A system of linear parks along the Seine River was under development on the east side of the suburb.

St. Vital Outdoor Pool was opened in 1967 as a Winnipeg Centennial project, and was renovated on 30 June 2016. Upon reopening there, due to increased demand beyond allowable capacity, several swimmers were turned away.

St. Vital is also home to Winnipeg's only Francophone outdoor market Jardins St-Léon Gardens.

== Sports ==
The St. Vital area contains a number of community centres, including the St. Vital Centennial Arena and the Dakota Community Centre, which includes the Jonathan Toews Sportsplex. The St. Vital Victorias are members of the Manitoba Major Junior Hockey League while the Winnipeg Freeze play in the Manitoba Junior Hockey League. The Winnipeg Saints of the MJHL played out of St. Vital from 2000–2012. Maple Grove Park is home to the St. Vital Mustangs Football Club and Manitoba's largest rugby complex.

St. Vital Outdoor Pool was opened in 1967 as a Winnipeg Centennial project, and was renovated on 30 June 2016. Upon reopening there, due to increased demand beyond allowable capacity, several swimmers were turned away.

Team	Founded	League	Arena	Championships
St. Vital Victorias	1975	MMJHL	St. Vital Centennial Arena	1
Winnipeg Freeze	2020	MJHL	Jonathan Toews Sportsplex	0

== Education ==
Most public schools in St. Vital are operated by the Louis Riel School Division; the exceptions are two schools for francophones in south St. Vital operated by the Division Scolaire Franco-Manitobaine. There are also two parochial schools administered by the Roman Catholic Archdiocese of Saint Boniface, and a number of private schools.

== Health care ==
The only major health care facility in St. Vital is St. Amant, located on River Road in the Minnetonka neighbourhood. It was originally a tuberculosis hospital, but was repurposed as a facility for developmentally challenged children in 1959. In 1974, it was renamed to honour Beatrice St. Amant. The neighbouring suburb of Fort Richmond is home to the Victoria General Hospital and nearby St. Boniface is home to the province's second largest hospital, St. Boniface General Hospital.

== Notable residents ==
- Janet Arnott, curling coach and Olympic gold medallist
- Yvonne Brill, engineer presented with the National Medal of Technology and Innovation by President Obama
- Reid Carruthers, World Curling Champion
- Nigel Dawes, professional ice hockey player
- Danny Duggan, professional wrestler
- Monica Goermann, gymnast
- Jennifer Jones, curler and 2014 Olympic gold medallist
- Brad Katona, UFC fighter
- Pete Kelly, NHL player
- Scott Koskie, professional volleyball player
- Connie Laliberte, curler
- Vic Lindquist, professional ice hockey player
- Gabby May, gymnast
- Corrine Peters, curler
- Louis Riel, founder of Manitoba whose family home (Riel House) in St. Vital is now a National Historic Site
- Andrea Slobodian, reporter
- Sami Jo Small, professional ice hockey player
- Adam Smoluk, actor and director
- Yolande Teillet, professional baseball player
- Jonathan Toews, professional ice hockey player for the Winnipeg Jets
