= Fort Garry, Winnipeg =

Suburb of Winnipeg, Canada

Fort Garry
- Suburb
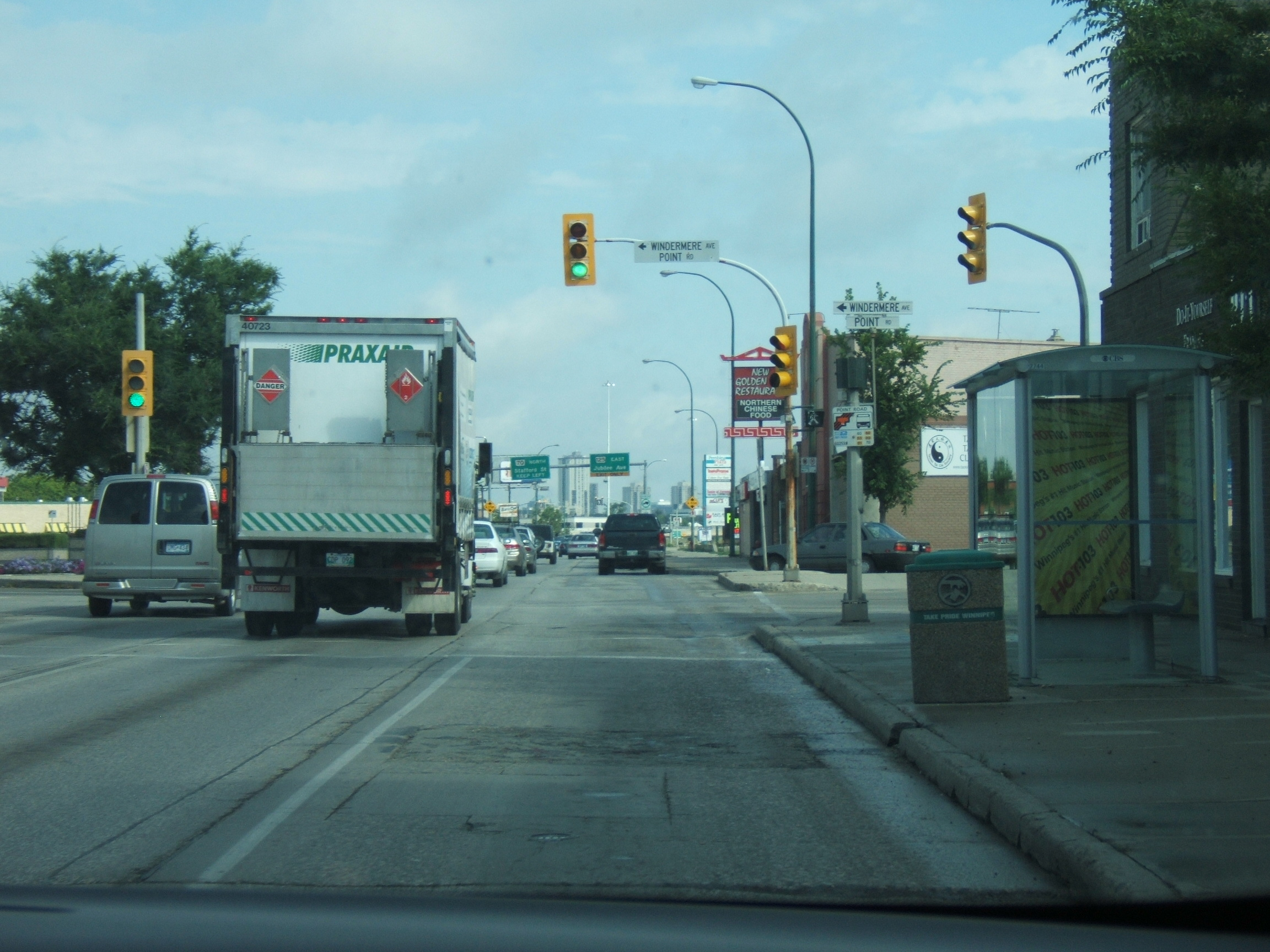
- Looking north on Pembina Highway in Fort Garry, Manitoba.

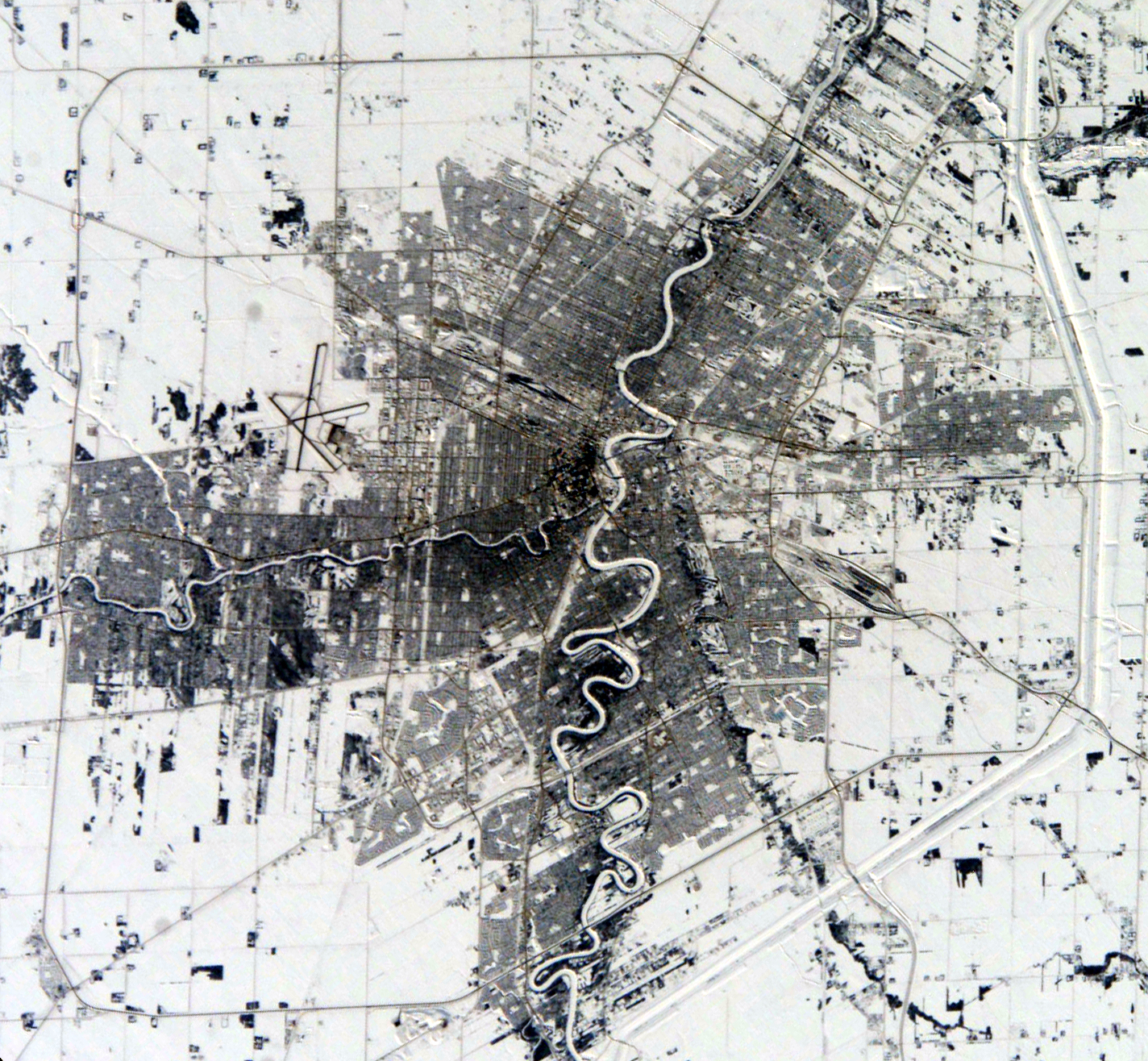
- Location within Winnipeg
- Coordinates: 49°50′29″N 97°09′00″W
- Country: Canada
- Province: Manitoba
- City: Winnipeg
- Elevation: 233 m (764 ft)

Population (2016)
  - Total: 23,980
- Time zone: UTC-6 (Central Standard Time)
  - Summer (DST): UTC-5 (Central Daylight Time)
- Forward Sortation Area: R3T
- Area codes: 204, 431

Fort Garry is a community area and neighbourhood of Winnipeg, Manitoba, Canada, located in the southwestern part of the city, south of the district of Fort Rouge and east of the Tuxedo area. It comprises parts of the city wards of River Heights - Fort Garry, Fort Rouge - East Fort Garry, Waverley West, and St. Norbert - Seine River.

Once the Rural Municipality of Fort Garry, it was named for the historical fortification in downtown Winnipeg known as Upper Fort Garry, although the nearest (northernmost) point of the district (at Jubilee Avenue and Lilac Street) is 3.75 km (2.33 mi) from the site of the fort.

== History ==
Federal census population history of Fort Garry
Year	Pop.	±%
1901	730	—
1906	600	−17.8%
1911	1,133	+88.8%
1916	1,907	+68.3%
1921	2,451	+28.5%
1926	3,168	+29.3%
1931	3,926	+23.9%
1936	4,205	+7.1%
1941	4,453	+5.9%
1946	5,200	+16.8%
1951	8,193	+57.6%
1956	13,592	+65.9%
1961	17,528	+29.0%
1966	21,177	+20.8%
1971	26,127	+23.4%
Source: Statistics Canada

Fort Garry was part of the Rural Municipality of St. Vital until 1912, when the Rural Municipality of Fort Garry was incorporated. It was originally a post of the Hudson's Bay Company and named after one of its officers, Nicholas Garry. The post office was opened in 1870 and, in 1876, the name was changed to Winnipeg.

In the early 1910s, 137 acres (55 ha) of land had been purchased to be set aside for the University of Manitoba campus.

At their December 1952 meeting, city councillors voted to add an additional ward besides the two that existed at the time.

Map showing the former boundaries of the R.M. of Fort Garry.

In 1972, the RM of Fort Garry joined with the City of Winnipeg and eleven other suburban municipalities to become a unicity.

== Demographics and neighbourhoods ==
Fort Garry is primarily a middle class residential area and is very ethnically diverse. There is a significant Chinese population, immediately south of the University of Manitoba.

Fort Garry includes the neighbourhoods of Beaumont, Wildwood Park, Point Road, Crescent Park, Chevrier, Fort Garry Industrial Park, Whyte Ridge, Fort Richmond, Waverley Heights, Richmond West, St. Norbert, and (in some references) Linden Woods. In 2005, the city began construction of Waverley West, a new suburb which is expected to grow to be larger than Brandon, Manitoba (Manitoba's second largest city). Its first section, Bridgwater Forest, was completed in 2010.

St. Norbert is separated from the rest of Fort Garry by the Perimeter Highway. The area of St. Norbert east of Pembina Highway is unique due to its large Francophone population and history.

The University of Manitoba's main campus is in central Fort Garry.

The 2016 population of Fort Garry, not including Fort Richmond, is 23,980.

Population
Neighbourhood	2016 Pop.	Area Sq. km.
Brockville	1,000	0.7
Beaumont	2,310	1.2
Point Road	1,870	0.8
Wildwood	1,130	1.3
Crescent Park	2,650	1.8
Maybank	2,500	0.9
Pembina Strip	3,175	0.7
Linden Ridge	1,655	0.6
Whyte Ridge	7,690	2.8
Total	23,980	8.0

== Sports ==
Century Arena, named to celebrate Canada's Centennial, opened on 8 December 1967. Its ice surface is a standard 61 by 26 metres (200 ft × 85 ft) with seating for 1,000. However, the initial hockey games scheduled were cancelled "due to technical difficulties." Official opening ceremonies were held Sunday, December 10. In 1989 the sound amplification system was upgraded so that the sound mixing board would be located within eye-view of the ice surface itself.

The Fort Garry area shares the Fort Garry/Fort Rouge Twins hockey team in the Manitoba Major Junior Hockey League who play out of the Century Arena in Fort Garry's industrial park.

The University of Manitoba Bisons play their homes games on the University's Fort Garry campus in various venues. The football team plays in Princess Auto Stadium, the hockey teams play in Wayne Fleming Arena at Max Bell Centre, and the basketball and volleyball teams play in the Investors Group Athletic Centre.

In 2010, construction began on a new $190-million football stadium at the University of Manitoba, beside the current University Stadium. It has a seating capacity of 33,000. The new stadium, Princess Auto Stadium, completed in spring of 2013, hosts the Winnipeg Blue Bombers of the Canadian Football League, the Manitoba Bisons football team, and the Winnipeg Rifles football club.

Team	Founded	League	Arena	Championships
Fort Garry/Fort Rouge Twins	1970	MMJHL	Century Arena	6
University of Manitoba Bisons	1877 (University)	CIS	various venues	
Winnipeg Blue Bombers	1930	Canadian Football League	Princess Auto Stadium	
Winnipeg Rifles	1999	Canadian Junior Football League	Princess Auto Stadium	

== See also ==
- List of rural municipalities in Manitoba
