= Riel House =

National Historic Site in Winnipeg, Canada

- Maison Riel
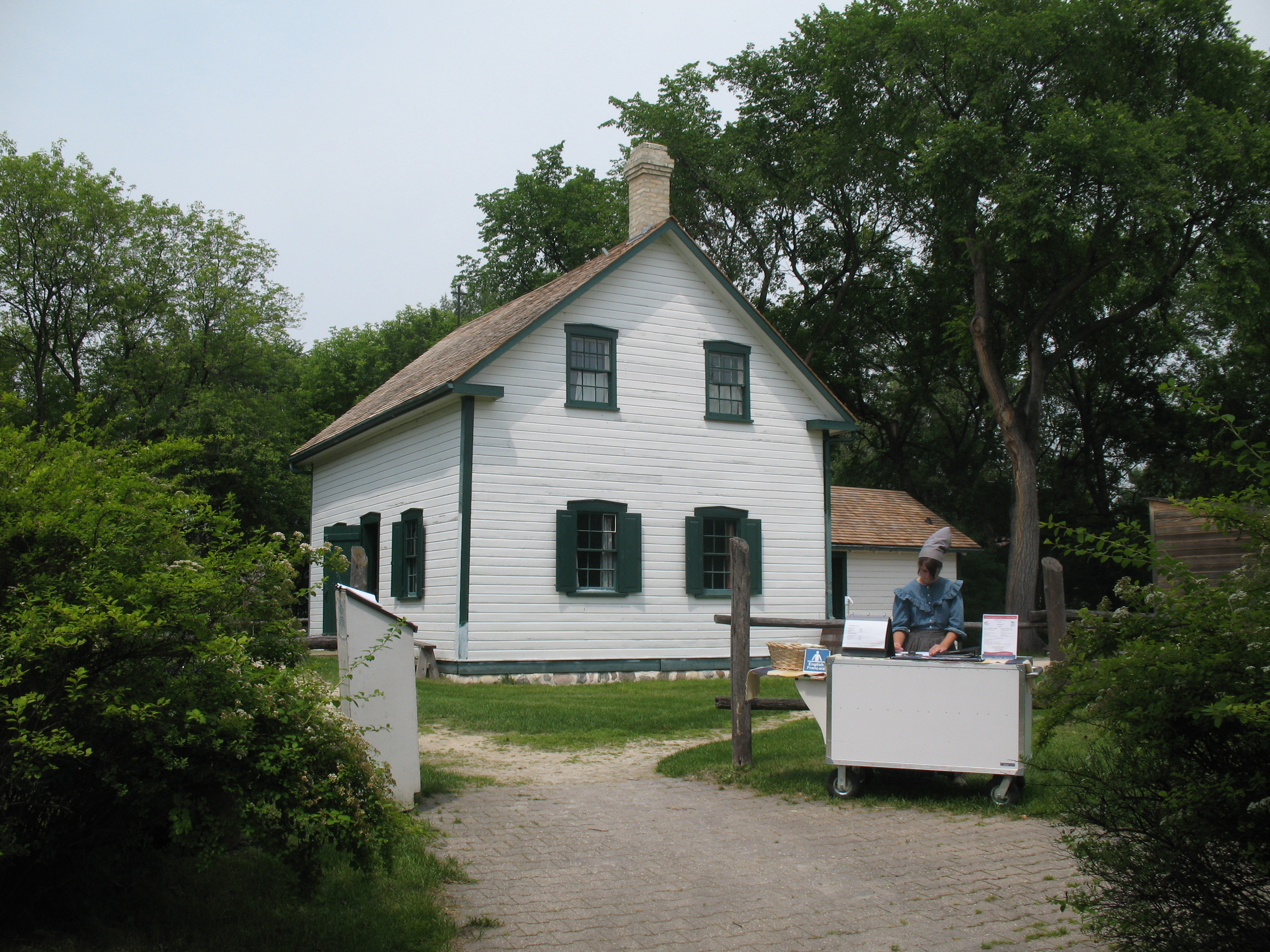
- The Riel House
- Location: 330 River Road; Winnipeg, Manitoba, R2M 4A5; Canada
- Coordinates: 49°49′09″N 97°08′10″W
- Type: Historic House
- Owner: Parks Canada
- Website: www.pc.gc.ca/en/lhn-nhs/mb/riel

Riel House is a National Historic Site commemorating the life of the Métis politician and activist Louis Riel, and also the daily life of Métis families in the Red River Settlement. The house is situated in the historic St. Vital parish of Winnipeg, in Manitoba, Canada. From 1865, the residence belonged to Riel's mother, Julie Riel (Lagimodière), and housed his brothers and their families. Louis Riel lived along with them from his return to Red River in 1868, through the Red River Resistance, until his exile in 1870. It is also where his body lay in state for two days in December 1885, after his sentencing and execution for murder and treason, before being buried in St. Boniface. The house remained within the possession of Riel descendants until 1968, when it was acquired by the Winnipeg Historical Society.

The house was restored to its 1886 condition and converted into a museum. It was designated a National Historic Site in 1976 and a Federal Heritage Building in 2000. It is owned and administered by Parks Canada, but since 2013, the Louis Riel Institute (an associate of the Manitoba Métis Federation) has provided interpretation and programming.
