= Weston, Winnipeg =

Weston
- Neighbourhood
- Nickname: CPR Town
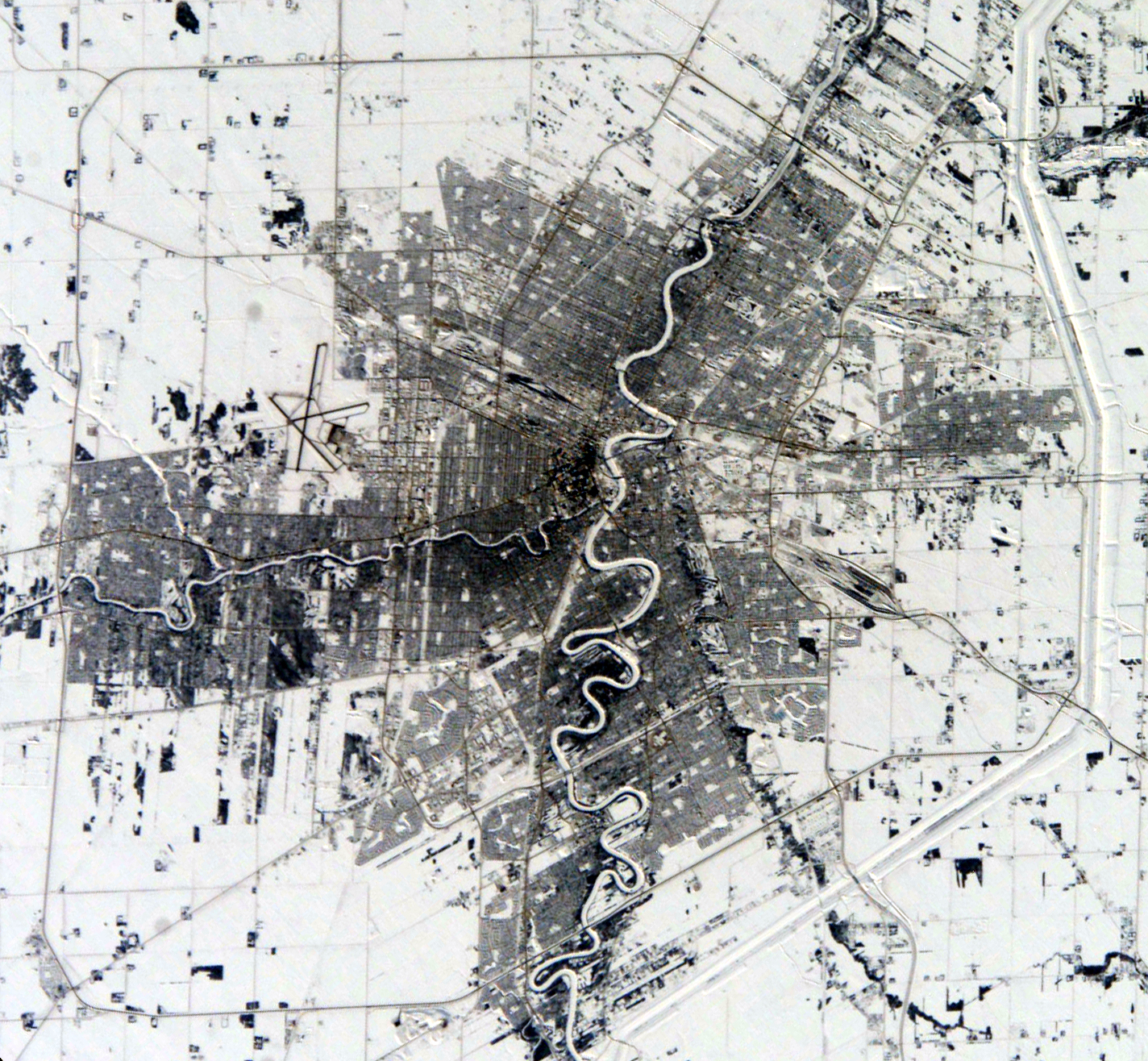
- Location within Winnipeg
- Coordinates: 49°54′58″N 97°11′24″W
- Country: Canada
- Province: Manitoba
- City: Winnipeg

Government
  - MP: Kevin Lamoureux (Winnipeg North)
  - MLA: Malaya Marcelino (Notre Dame)
  - Councilor: Vivian Santos (Point Douglas)

Area
  - Neighbourhood: 1.4 km^{2} (0.54 sq mi)
  - Metro: 5,306.79 km^{2} (2,048.96 sq mi)
- Elevation: 233 m (764 ft)

Population (2016)
  - Neighbourhood: 6,235
  - Density: 4,500/km^{2} (12,000/sq mi)
  - Metro: 778,489

Weston is a neighbourhood in Winnipeg, Manitoba, Canada, located south of the Canadian Pacific Railway Weston Yards, west of McPhillips Street, north of Notre Dame Avenue, and east of Keewatin Street. It is a working-class residential and industrial district with some retail establishments along Logan Avenue and on Keewatin Street.

Historically, the neighbourhood was nicknamed "CPR Town" due to the large number of railway workers who resided there. As the number of jobs at the Weston Shops declined, correspondingly, so did the neighbourhood. About 80% of the housing stock was constructed before 1960.

== Demographics ==
Population history
Year	Pop.	±%
1971	7,560	—
1976	6,835	−9.6%
1981	5,960	−12.8%
1986	5,985	+0.4%
1991	5,715	−4.5%
1996	5,660	−1.0%
2001	5,785	+2.2%
2006	5,810	+0.4%
2016	6,235	+7.3%

The 2016 Census reported that there were 6,235 people living in the neighbourhood. Weston is 1.4 km^{2}, therefore the population density is 4,500 people per km^{2}. The median household income in Weston is $31,766, much lower than the city median at $49,790.

The racial make-up of the neighbourhood in 2006 was:

- 47.2% White
- 25.7% Aboriginal; 12.7% First Nations, 12.6% Metis
- 24.4% Southeast Asian; 23.6% Filipino
- 1.0% Black
- 0.9% East Asian; 0.9% Chinese, 0.0% Korean, 0.0% Japanese
- 0.3% South Asian
- 0.2% Latin American
- 0.3% Multiracial; 12.8% including Metis
