= Varennes, Winnipeg =

Neighbourhood in Winnipeg, Manitoba, Canada

Coordinates: 49.855°N 97.112°W

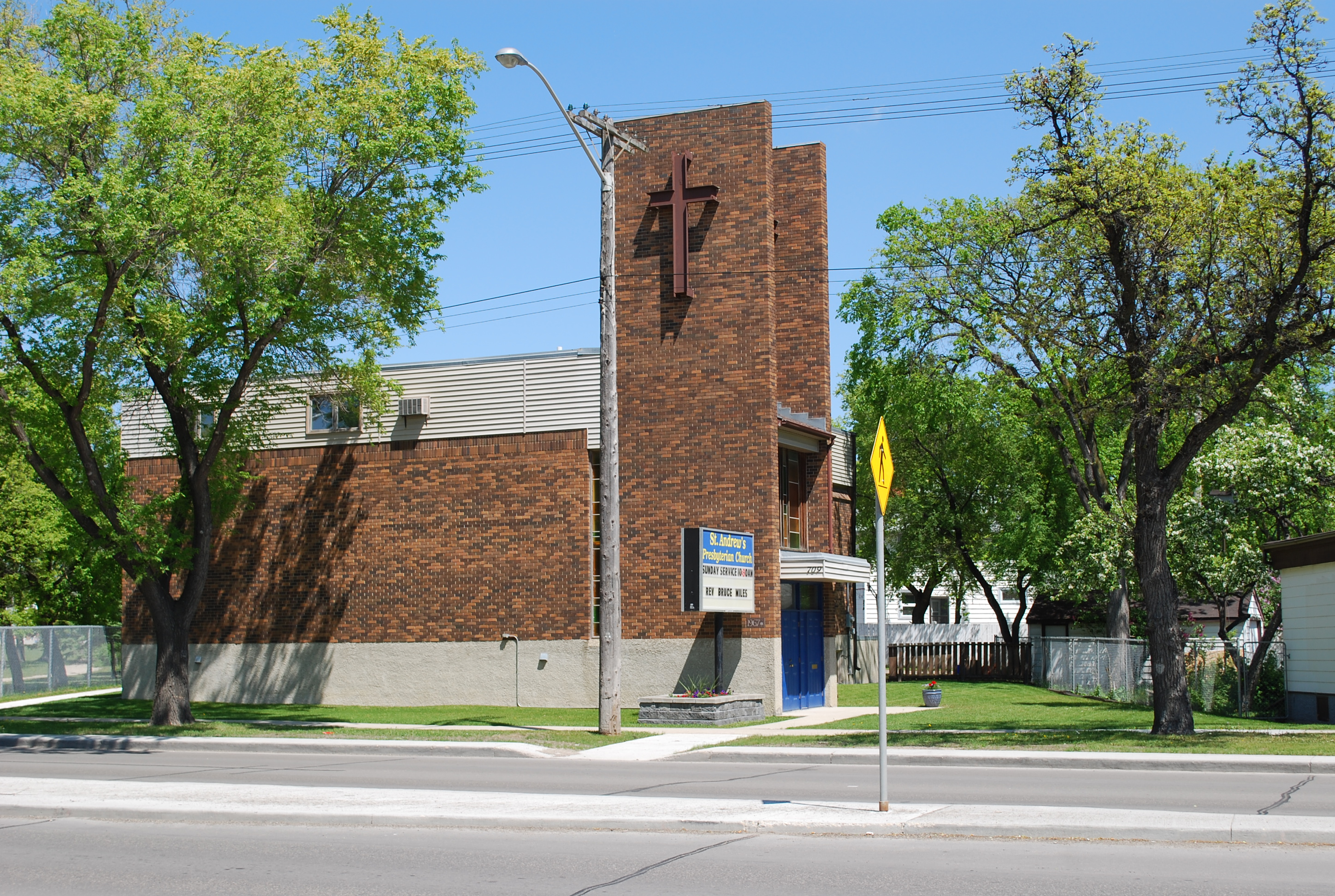
St. Andrew's Presbyterian Church in Varennes.

Varennes is a neighbourhood in the city of Winnipeg, Manitoba, Canada, located in the northern section of the district of St. Vital. It is a small triangular neighbourhood located, and is bounded by St. Mary's Road on the west, Fermor Avenue on the south, and St. Anne's Road (Trans-Canada Highway) on the east. In the 2001 census, Varennes had a population of 1,080.

The neighbourhood was named for Pierre Gaultier de Varennes, sieur de La Vérendrye, an early French explorer in the district.

It is in the federal riding of Saint Boniface—Saint Vital and the provincial riding of St. Vital.

== History ==
The area now known as Varennes was the northern terminus of the original Crow Wing Trail, a Red River Trail that ran down the east side of the Red River to Emerson, Manitoba. St. Vital's first livery stable was founded in the area of the intersection of St. Anne's Road and St. Mary's Road (St. Anne's Junction) by Abraham Guay, a local landowner.

== Amenities ==
Varennes is the home of Ecole Varennes, a French-immersion primary school administered by the Louis Riel School Division; as well as two churches, St. Mary's Road United Church and St. Andrew's Presbyterian Church. Until the spring of 2009, Global Television's Winnipeg studios were located in Varennes. There is significant light commercial development along both St. Mary's Road and St. Anne's Road.
