= Minnetonka, Winnipeg =

Neighbourhood in Winnipeg, Manitoba, Canada

Minnetonka Riel
- Neighbourhood
- Interactive map of Minnetonka
- Coordinates: 49.820°N 97.125°W

Area
  - Total: 2.4 km^{2} (0.93 sq mi)

Population (2016)
  - Total: 4,285
  - Density: 1,800/km^{2} (4,600/sq mi)
- Forward sortation area: R2N
- Area codes: 204 and 431

Minnetonka is a neighbourhood in the city of Winnipeg, Manitoba, Canada, located in the southern section of the district of St. Vital. It is bounded by the Red River on the west and south, Abinojii Mikanah on the north, and St. Mary's Road on the east. As of the 2016 census, Minnetonka had a population of 4,285. On some maps, Minnetonka is called Riel.

== History ==
The area was first permanently settled in the 19th century. One early settler was Julie Riel, the mother of Louis Riel, whose house on River Road is now Riel House National Historic Site. Minnetonka is mainly residential, with some light commercial (mainly retail) activity along St. Mary's Road.

== Facilities ==
Minnetonka is home to Darwin School, Minnetonka School, and St. John the Apostle Ukrainian Catholic Church. St. Amant, located on River Road, serves individuals with developmental disabilities and autism, but before 1959 was the provincial tuberculosis hospital.
