= Glenwood, Winnipeg =

Neighbourhood in Winnipeg, Manitoba, Canada

Glenwood
- Neighbourhood
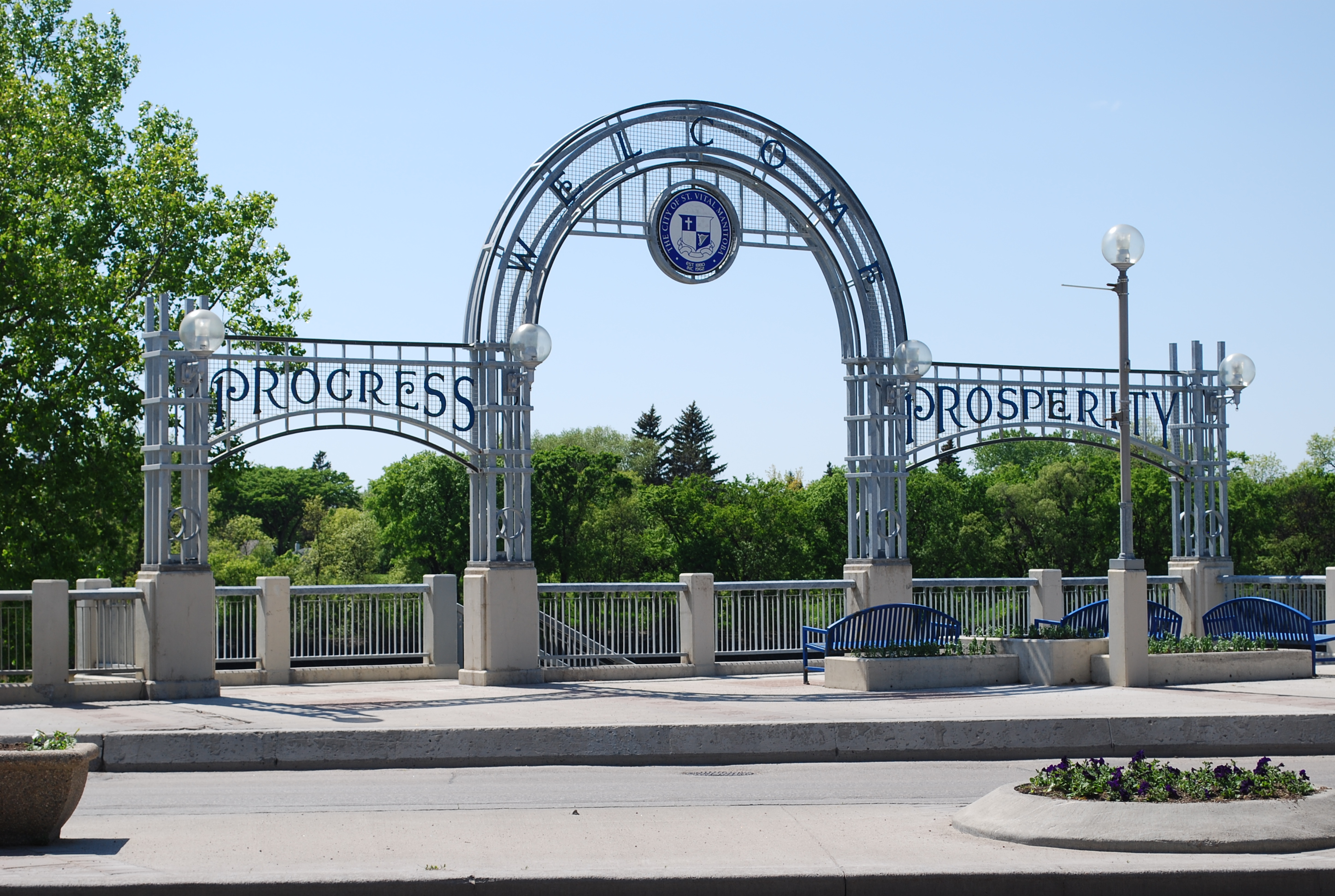
- St. Vital Arch

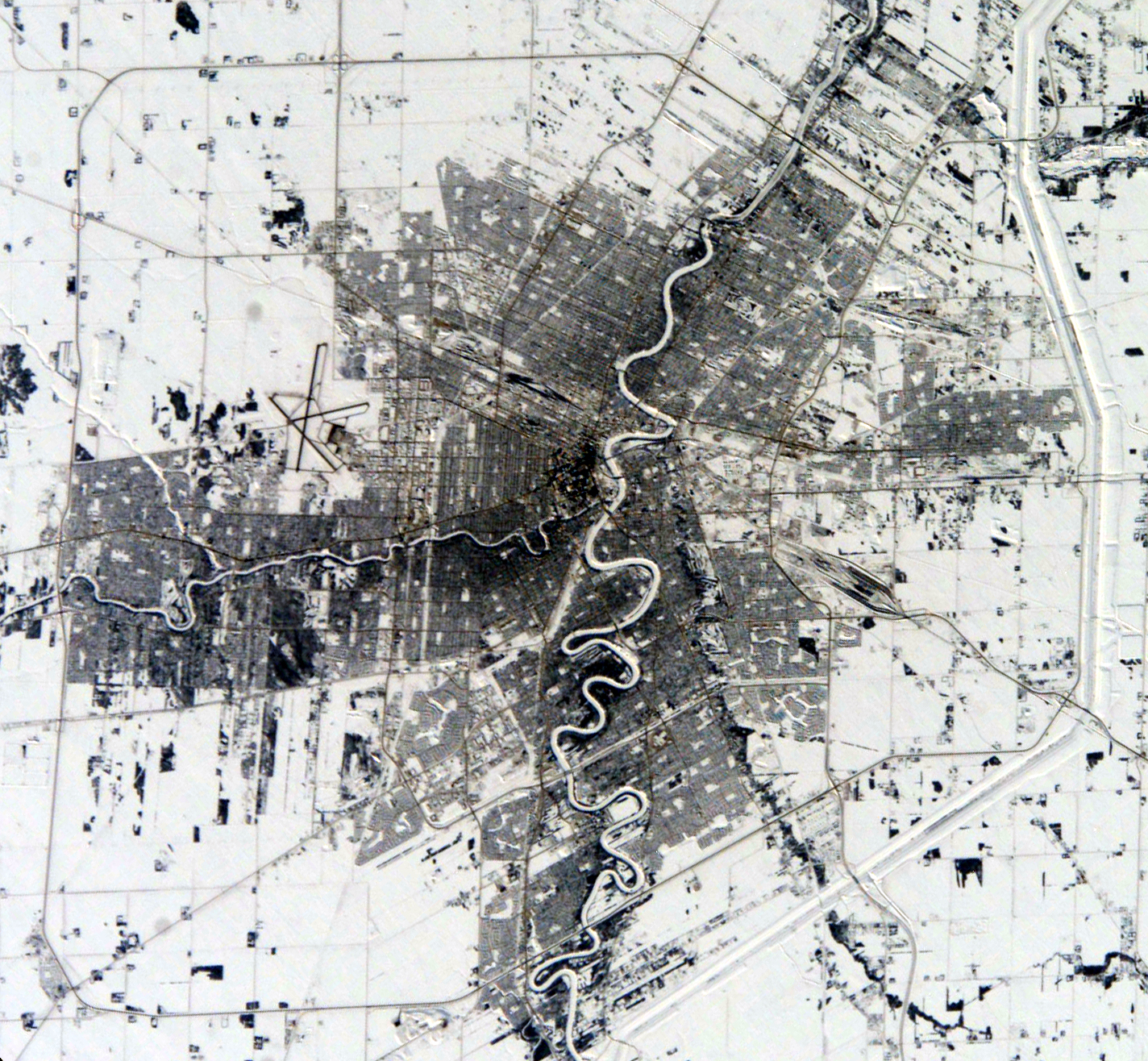
- Location within Winnipeg
- Coordinates: 49.867°N 97.105°W
- Country: Canada
- City: Winnipeg
- Ward: St. Vital

Area
  - Neighbourhood: 1.6 km^{2} (0.62 sq mi)
  - Metro: 5,306.79 km^{2} (2,048.96 sq mi)
- Elevation: 232 m (761 ft)

Population (2016)
  - Neighbourhood: 3,880
  - Density: 2,400/km^{2} (6,300/sq mi)
  - Metro: 778,489
- Forward Sortation Area: R2M
- Area codes: Area codes 204 and 431

Glenwood is a neighbourhood in the city of Winnipeg, Manitoba, Canada, located in the northern section of the district of St. Vital.

It is bounded by Carrière Avenue on the north, the Seine River on the east, Fermor Avenue on the south, and the Red River and St. Anne's Road on the west. As of the 2016 census, Glenwood had a population of 3,880.

It is one of the oldest neighbourhoods in St. Vital and is mainly residential with some light commercial development, mainly retail and professional, along St. Mary's Road and St. Anne's Road. Guay Park in west Glenwood is the home of a war memorial honouring St. Vital residents who died in World Wars I and II and in Korea. Glenwood also contains the St. Vital Arch, featuring the former independent city's coat of arms. A mural at the St. Vital Curling Club in south Glenwood depicts scenes from the 1997 Red River flood; a list of flood years is also inscribed on the building's outer walls.

The neighbourhood is also the home of Glenwood Community Centre, Glenwood School, the New Testament Church of God Pentecostal Church, the Winnipeg International Church of Christ, and Paroisse Ste. Marie, a francophone Roman Catholic church.
