= Malaya Marcelino =

Canadian politician

The Honourable Malaya Marcelino MLA

Minister of Labour and Immigration
- Incumbent
- Assumed office October 18, 2023
- Premier: Wab Kinew
- Preceded by: Jon Reyes

Member of the Legislative Assembly of Manitoba for Notre Dame
- Incumbent
- Assumed office September 10, 2019
- Preceded by: riding established

Personal details
- Born: Philippines
- Party: New Democratic

Malaya Marcelino is a Canadian politician, who was elected to the Legislative Assembly of Manitoba in the 2019 Manitoba general election. She represents the electoral district of Notre Dame as a member of the Manitoba New Democratic Party.

She is the daughter of former MLA Flor Marcelino.

== Electoral record ==
2023 Manitoba general election: Notre Dame
Party	Candidate	Votes	%	±%	Expenditures
New Democratic	Malaya Marcelino	3,832	75.58	+10.63	$18,176.41
Progressive Conservative	Mufarrah Waheed	732	14.44	-0.81	$0.00
Liberal	Winston Wuttunee	319	6.29	-7.27	$0.00
Green	Micah Dewey	105	2.07	-3.01	$664.62
Communist	Andrew Taylor	82	1.62	+1.00	$106.40
Total valid votes/expense limit		5,070	99.59	–	$52,357.00
Total rejected and declined ballots		21	0.41	–	
Turnout		5,091	37.88	-2.98	
Eligible voters		13,439			
New Democratic hold		Swing		+5.72	
Source(s) Source: Elections Manitoba

2019 Manitoba general election: Notre Dame
Party	Candidate	Votes	%	±%	Expenditures
New Democratic	Malaya Marcelino	3,361	64.95	+20.1	$14,607.43
Progressive Conservative	Marsha Street	789	15.25	-4.7	$521.28
Liberal	Donovan Martin	702	13.57	-8.6	$4,041.34
Green	Martha Jo Willard	263	5.08	-1.7	$494.13
Communist	Andrew Taylor	32	0.62		$310.80
Manitoba Forward	Margaret Sturby	28	0.54		$0.00
Total valid votes		5,175	100.0		
Total rejected ballots					
Turnout			43.5		
Eligible voters					
New Democratic hold		Swing		+12.4	
