= Maple Grove Park =

Large park in Winnipeg, Manitoba, Canada

Coordinates: 49°47′31″N 97°07′39″W

- Interactive map of Maple Grove Park
- Location: 190 Frobisher Road; Winnipeg, Manitoba, R2N 3Z1; Canada
- Area: 81 ha (200 acres)

Maple Grove Rugby Park is an 81 ha (200 acres) park in Winnipeg, Manitoba, Canada. Located in the St. Vital neighbourhood, the park is bordered by the Perimeter Highway to the south, St. Mary's Road to the east, and the Red River to the north and west. King's Park is situated across the river in Fort Richmond.

The park is home to the St. Vital Mustangs Football Club, which operates a football facility and clubhouse on the grounds. Maple Grove Rugby Park, operated by Rugby Manitoba, is located next to the football facility and is Manitoba's largest rugby-only complex with five regulation-sized pitches and its own clubhouse.

Other amenities at the park include an off-leash dog park, Frisbee fields, beach volleyball courts, and a boat launch into the Red River.

There is currently no public transit access to or from the Park with Winnipeg Transit.

== History ==
The first mention of Maple Grove Park was in September 1943 for a picnic sponsored by the Knights of Columbus Hostess Club for military servicemen.

In November 1961 St. Vital Mayor Fred Brennan applied to Metro Council for a $30,000-40,000 ski and toboggan slide. Floodlights for nighttime skiing were installed the next month.

At some point in the late 1960s Metro took over responsibility for the Park.

An international archery competition, featuring archers from Canada and the United States was held in Maple Grove Park July 4-5, 1970 to celebrate Manitoba's centennial.

Metro's Parks Committee studied a plan at the beginning of January 1971 which would improve winter recreation facilities (skiing) and construct a summertime marina at Maple Grove Park.
