= Winnipeg Route 150 =

City route in Winnipeg, Canada

Route 150
- St. Anne's Road
- Route 150 highlighted in red
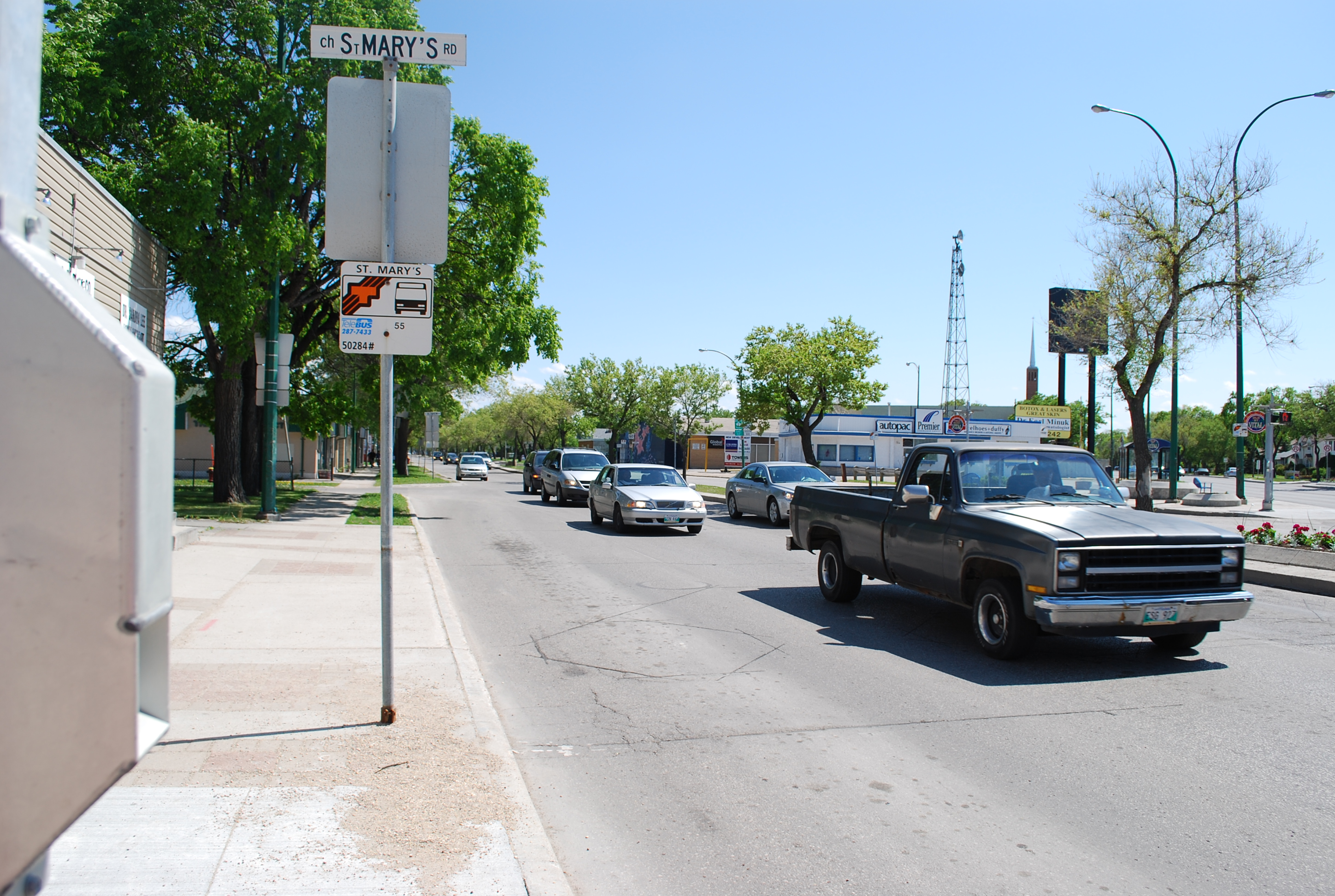
- St. Anne's Road looking southward, at its junction with St. Mary's Road in north St. Vital.

Route information
- Maintained by City of Winnipeg
- Length: 7.0 km (4.3 mi)
- Existed: 1966–present
- Component highways: PTH 1 (Trans-Canada Highway)

Major junctions
- North end: PTH 1 west / Route 52 (St. Mary's Rd)
- Route 165 (Abinojii Mikanah); PTH 1 east / Route 135 (Fermor Ave)
- South end: PTH 100 (TCH) (Perimeter Hwy)

Location
- Country: Canada
- Province: Manitoba

Highway system
- Provincial highways in Manitoba; Winnipeg City Routes
← Route 145	→ Route 155

Route 150, locally known as St. Anne's Road (French: Chemin Ste. Anne), is a major arterial route in Winnipeg, Manitoba, Canada.

It branches off from St. Mary's Road in north St. Vital and runs southeastward through central and southern St. Vital to the Perimeter Highway. It is a collector road for traffic between south St. Boniface, central and south St. Vital, and downtown. St. Anne's Road from St. Mary's Road to Fermor Avenue is part of the Trans-Canada Highway.

St. Anne's Road continues south of the Perimeter Highway and ends at the Red River Floodway. This part of the road was formerly signed as Provincial Road 300.

The speed limit on Route 150 is 60 km/h (37 mph), except for the section directly north of the Perimeter Highway, where it increases to 70 km/h (43 mph).

== History ==
Prior to the construction of the Red River Floodway and Highway 59, St. Anne's Road was a heavily-used road connecting Winnipeg with the community of Ste. Anne, Manitoba, and much of southeastern Manitoba, including the town of Steinbach. Sections of the original country road still exist in the Rural Municipalities of Taché and Ste. Anne, but is no longer a continuous road.

Outside of Winnipeg, the road is generally spelled Ste. Anne's Road (French: Chemin Sainte-Anne).

In 2013, the Manitoba government unveiled future plans to construct an interchange at the junction of the Perimeter and St. Anne's Road, to replace the at-grade intersection and traffic lights that currently exist. This plan was subsequently withdrawn. According to a 2020 report, there will be an interchange built to replace the intersection, however there is currently no timeline for construction nor funding in place.

== Major intersections ==
From north to south, all intersections are at-grade unless otherwise indicated. The entire route is in Winnipeg.

km	mi	Destinations	Notes
0.0	0.0	St. Mary's Road (PTH 1 (TCH) west) / Route 52	Route 150 northern terminus; north end of PTH 1 concurrency; no southbound exit
0.95	0.59	Kingswood Avenue	
1.15	0.71	Fermor Avenue (PTH 1 (TCH) east) / Route 135	South end of PTH 1 concurrency
1.29	0.80	Niakwa Road	
1.89	1.17	Bonita Avenue	
2.62	1.63	Worthington Avenue	
2.97	1.85	Lavalee Avenue	
3.19	1.98	Abinojii Mikanah (Route 165)	
3.68	2.29	Meadowwood Drive	
4.55	2.83	Novavista Drive	
5.17	3.21	Southglen Boulevard / Shorehill Drive	
5.67	3.52	Warde Avenue	
6.22	3.86	Aldgate Road	
7.00	4.35	Perimeter Highway (PTH 100 (TCH))	Route 150 southern terminus
1.000 mi = 1.609 km; 1.000 km = 0.621 mi: Concurrency terminus; Incomplete access
