= Marlton, Winnipeg =

Neighbourhood in Winnipeg, Manitoba, Canada

Marlton
- Neighbourhood
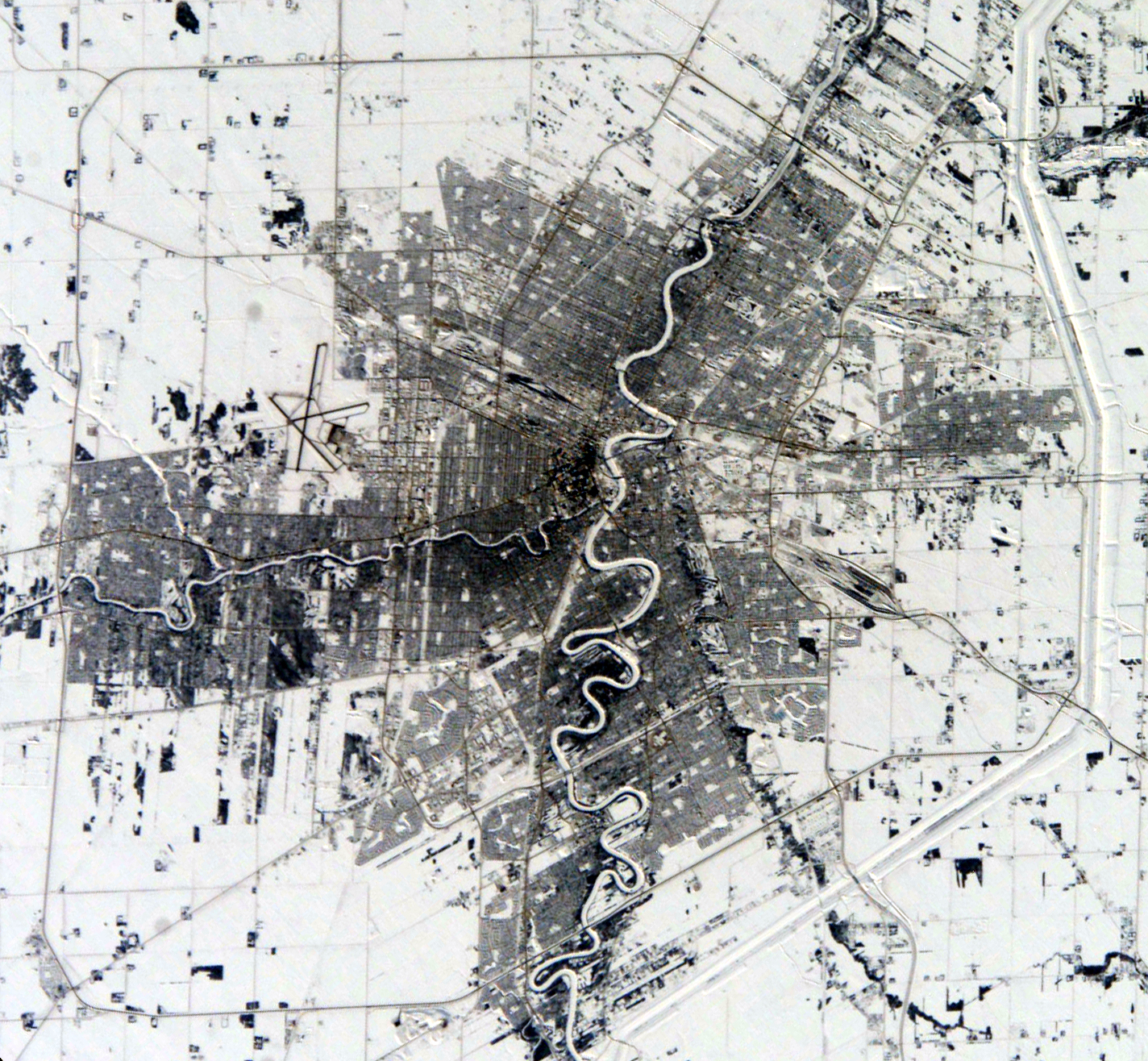
- Location within Winnipeg
- Coordinates: 49°51′48″N 97°16′14″W
- Country: Canada
- Province: Manitoba
- City: Winnipeg
- Established: 1909
- Founder: Winnipeg Golf Club and Hall Company Ltd

Population
  - Total: 635
  - Density: 1,123.6/km^{2} (2,910/sq mi)

Marlton is one of the original neighbourhoods in the area of Charleswood in Winnipeg, Manitoba. It is bordered by Roblin Boulevard, bisects Tom Chester park to the east and Grant Avenue to the south.

Marlton is part of the Assiniboine South Neighbourhood Cluster. It is part of the Winnipeg electoral ward of Charleswood - Tuxedo - Westwood, the provincial electoral district of Roblin and the federal riding of Charleswood—St. James—Assiniboia—Headingley.

== History ==
A portion of the neighbourhood was developed by the Winnipeg Golf Club and by Hall Company Ltd in 1909. These houses were incorporated into the RM of Charleswood in 1913.

== Demographics ==
The neighbourhood is predominantly white, middle class and anglophone. According to the 2016 Census, the neighbourhood is 88.2% Anglophone. The neighbourhood is majority white, with the largest non-white ethnic groups being Indigenous or Metis (6.3%) and the remaining 5.5% of residents belonging to other visible minorities.

The average income of the neighbourhood is $58,668, higher than the city average of $44,915.
