= Elm Park, Winnipeg =

Neighbourhood in Winnipeg, Canada

Elm Park
- Neighbourhood
- Interactive map of Elm Park
- Coordinates: 49°51′18″N 97°07′01″W

Area
  - Total: 0.9 km^{2} (0.35 sq mi)
- Elevation: 233 m (764 ft)

Population (2021)
  - Total: 1,435
  - Density: 1,842/km^{2} (4,770/sq mi)
- Forward sortation area: R2M
- Area codes: Area codes 204 and 431

Elm Park is a neighbourhood in the city of Winnipeg, Manitoba, Canada. Located in the northern section of the district of St. Vital, it is bounded to the north by the Red River, to the east by St. Mary's Road, to the south by Fermor Avenue, and to the west by Dunkirk Drive. As of the 2021 census, Elm Park had a population of 1,435.

== History ==
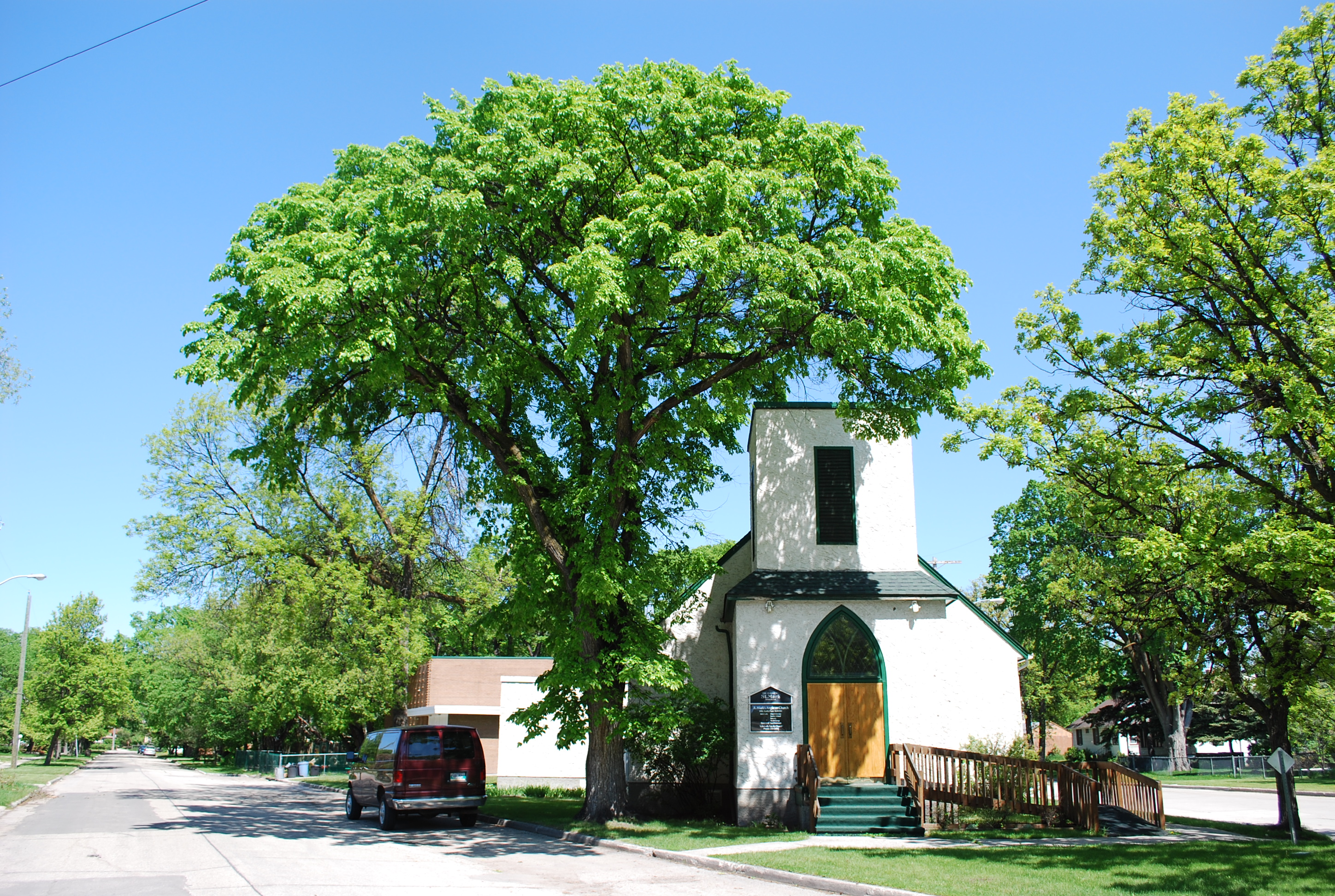
St. Mark's Anglican Church in Elm Park

The neighbourhoods of Elm Park and Kingston Crescent (located to the west of Dunkirk Drive) were originally a park founded by Albert William Austin's Winnipeg Street Railway Company in 1890. The trolley company had recently extended a line to just north of the Red River along what is now Osborne Street; by founding Elm Park directly across the river from the end of the trolley line, Austin hoped to increase off-peak and weekend use of the line. The trolley company built a pontoon bridge for foot traffic, and Elm Park soon became a popular summertime destination for Winnipeg residents.

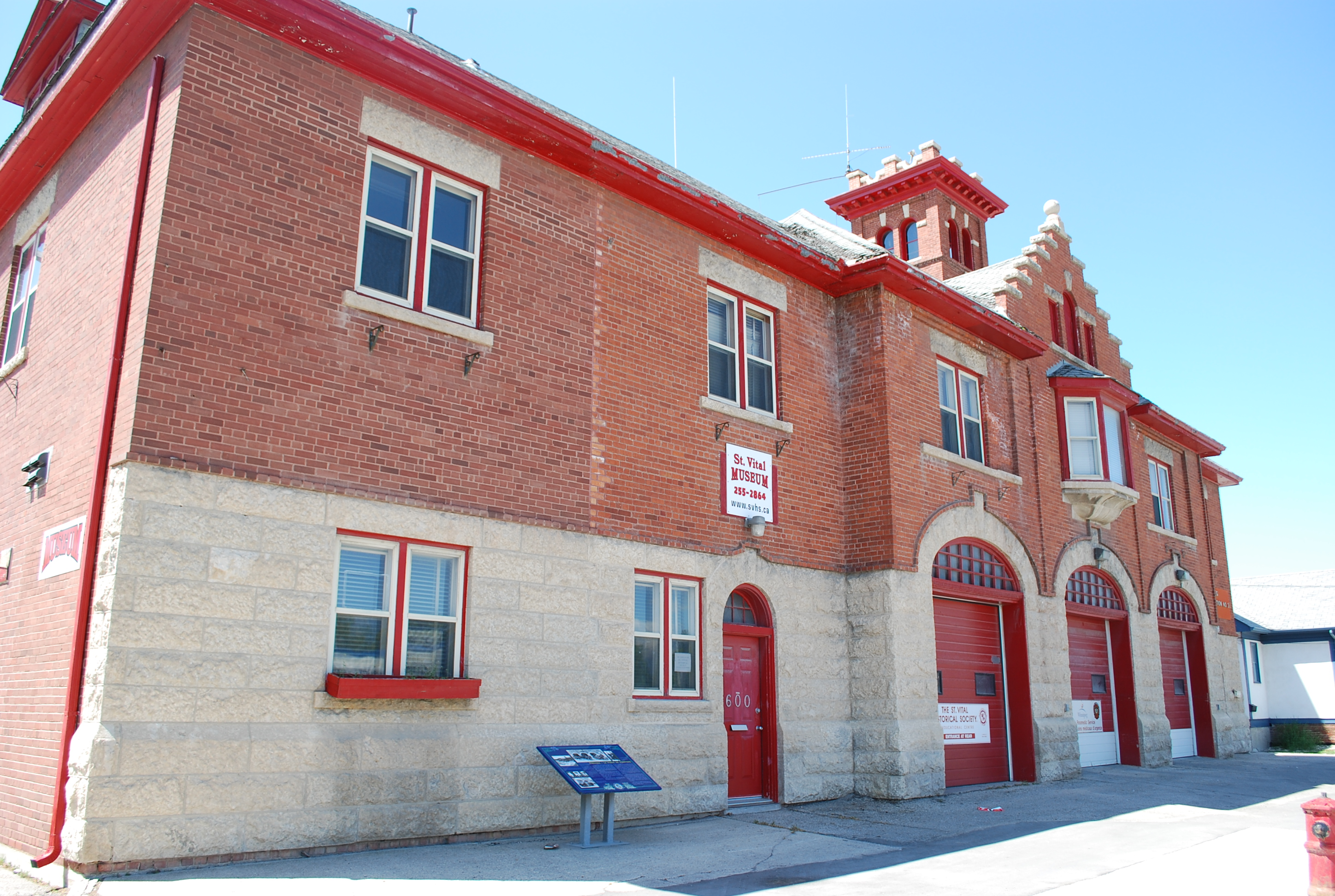
The St. Vital Fire Hall in Elm Park sheltered evacuees during the 1950 Red River Flood, and is still used as a working fire hall and as a museum.

The popularity of Elm Park waned in the 1910s. It closed in approximately 1912 when the pontoon bridge was replaced by a steel truss bridge. Eventually the lands to the east of Dunkirk Drive were bought by the City of St. Vital; the new neighbourhood was named Elm Park after the former park. Although most of the land in the east of the new neighbourhood was converted into single-family housing (with some apartment buildings along St. Mary's Road), most of the land in the southwest corner was converted into the home of the Winnipeg Canoe Club, eventually becoming a private golf course. There are also three small public parks remaining of what was once Elm Park: Dean Finlay Park on the corner of Sunset Boulevard and Killarney Street, Carey Park on Elm Park Road, and St. Vital Memorial Park on Fermor Avenue. Many of the older oak, ash, elm, and cottonwood trees were retained during development and line the streets of the current subdivision.

Many buildings in Elm Park were damaged by the 1950 Red River Flood. The neighbourhood was one of the worst hit areas in the city. The St. Vital Fire Hall, which was opened in 1914, sheltered refugees during the flood and was featured in a Life magazine article about the disaster.

In 1960, the municipality of St. Vital moved into a new City Hall located in Elm Park directly south of the fire hall. The building is still in use as a municipal office for the City of Winnipeg.

Elm Park was protected during the 2009 Red River flood by both the Red River Floodway and by the use of sandbags on Kingston Row.

== Amenities ==
Elm Park is the home of Glenlawn Collegiate, Windsor School, the South Winnipeg YM/YWCA, and St. Mark's Anglican Church. In federal politics, it is in the electoral district (riding) of Saint Boniface—Saint Vital and its Member of Parliament is Dan Vandal of the Liberal Party of Canada. In provincial politics, it is in the riding of St. Vital and its Member of the Legislative Assembly is Jamie Moses of the New Democratic Party of Manitoba.
