= Omand's Creek =

Stream in Winnipeg, Manitoba, Canada

Coordinates: 49°52′43″N 97°11′27″W

Omand's Creek is a stream that runs throughout Winnipeg, Manitoba, Canada. Its surroundings vary, from prairie to box stores. It additionally runs through Omand Park and Bluestem Nature Park in the Wolseley area, into the Assiniboine River.

== History ==
Omand's Creek is named after John Omand (1823–1905) who farmed near the mouth of the creek for 47 years. Before Omand lived on the land it was known as Catfish Creek. On June 19, 1816 Cuthbert Grant and the men who were with him rested on the bank of the creek before the Battle of Seven Oaks. In 1850 the land on the west side of the creek was granted by the Hudson's Bay Company to build St. James Church and Cemetery. In 1860 a bridge was built across Omand's Creek in order to improve access to the church. A battle between the Saulteaux and the Portage La Prairie Sioux was also fought between Sherbrook Street and Omand's Creek some time in the mid 1800s.

== Events ==
The Green Action Centre organizes annual cleanups in early spring. It is possible to canoe along the creek in the spring when water levels are high but it requires several portages.

== Parks ==
The City of Winnipeg operates several parks along Omand's creek.

Omand Park is located on the west side of Omand's creek where it joins the Assiniboine river. This park has a couple of baseball fields and a walking loop. On the east side of the creek confluence is Halter Park.

Further north and upstream, the Greenway south, Blue Stem Nature Park, and Greenway north parks surround the creek with natural terrain meeting the water.

== Crime ==
In 2014, Omand's Creek became associated with violent crime after several teens were robbed and held against their will under a railway bridge over the creek east of the Polo Park Shopping Centre Police speculated that the crime may have been part of a gang initiation.

== See also ==
- List of rivers of Manitoba
