= 1950 Red River flood =

Historic flood in North Dakota, United States and Manitoba, Canada

- Date: April 15–June 12, 1950
- Location: Wahpeton - Breckenridge Fargo - Moorhead Grand Forks - East Grand Forks Oslo, Minnesota Pembina, North Dakota Winnipeg, Manitoba
- Deaths: Canada: 3 United States: 5
- Property damage: $600 million -$1 billion

The 1950 Red River flood was a devastating flood that took place along the Red River in The Dakotas and Manitoba from April 15 to June 12, 1950. Damage was particularly severe in the city of Winnipeg and its environs, which were inundated on May 5, also known as Black Friday to some residents.

An estimated 70,000–100,000 residents had to be evacuated, and four of eleven bridges were destroyed. In that year, the Red River reached its highest level since 1861 and flooded most of the Red River Valley, more than 1,400 km^{2} (550 mi^{2}). One man died, and property losses due to the flood were estimated at more than $600 million to one billion.

To prevent and reduce future damage, the government constructed the Red River Floodway, which was completed in 1968. It has been estimated to have prevented more than $100 billion (CAD) in cumulative flood damage.

== Winnipeg ==
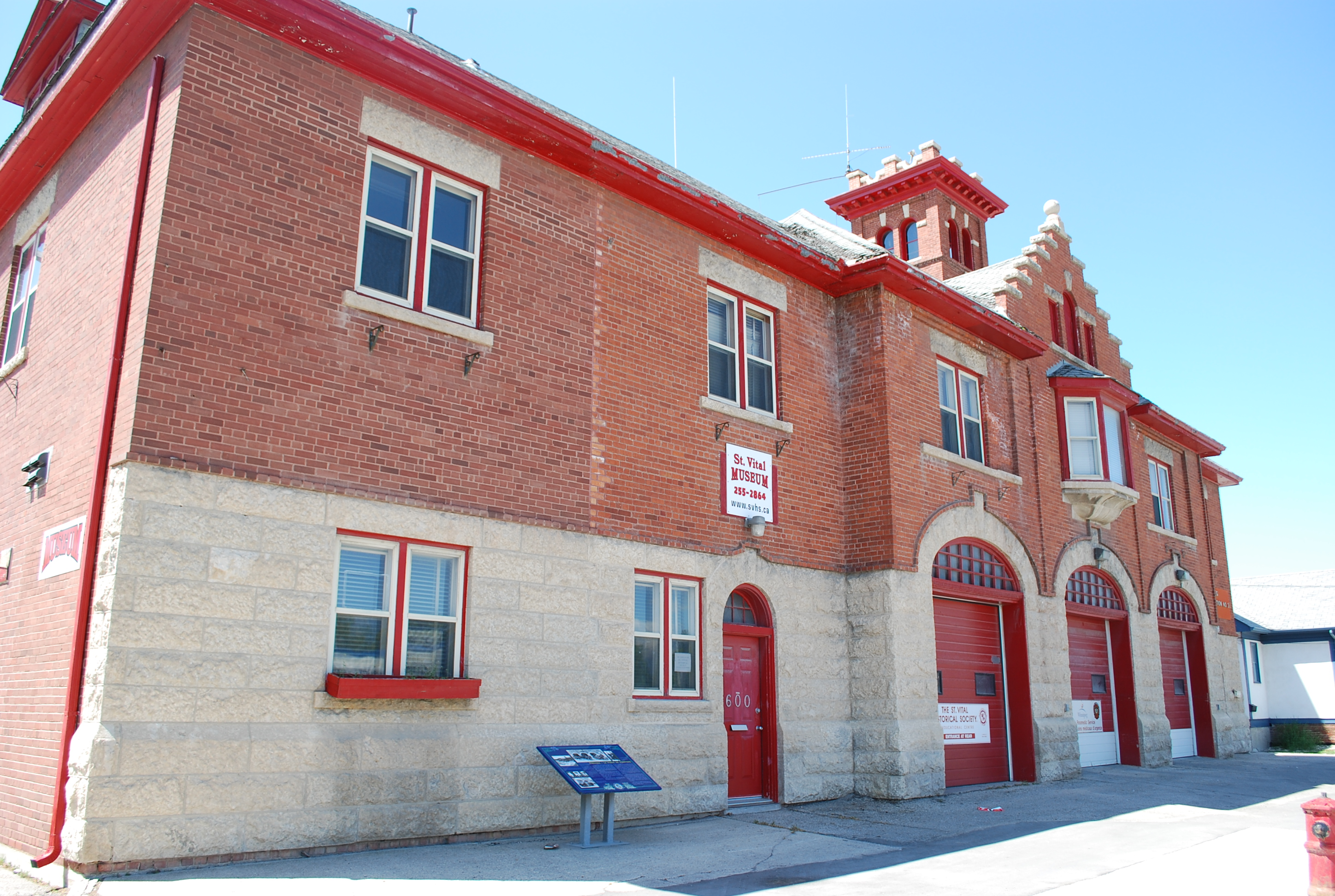
The St. Vital Fire Hall in Elm Park sheltered evacuees during the flood.

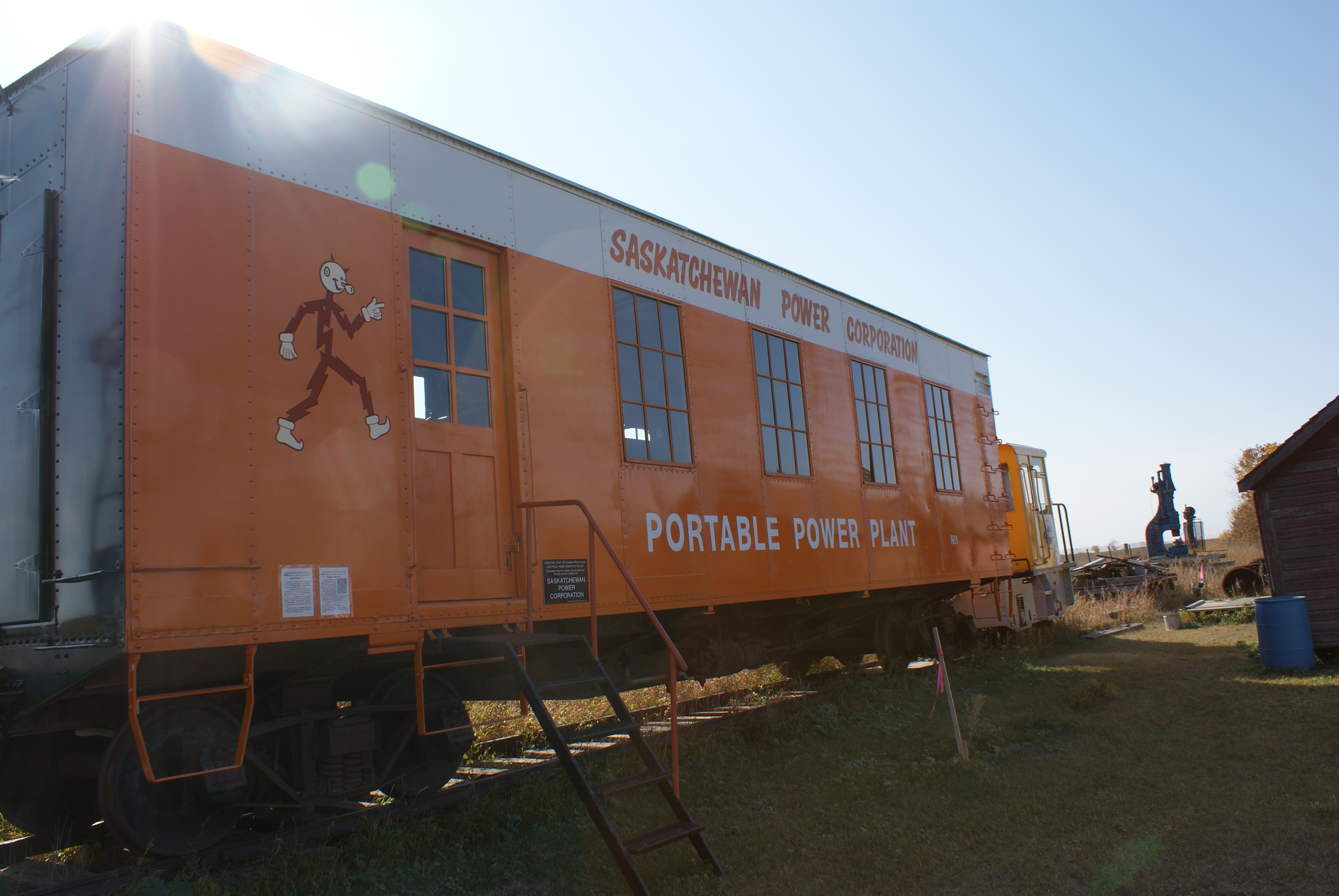
Portable power plant used by St. Boniface Hospital during flood relief efforts.

Although seasonal flooding was common, this flood surpassed the others. The north-flowing Red River was fed by flows resulting from melting of heavy snows in the winter and runoff from heavy rains in the spring. Eight dikes gave way and flooded much of Winnipeg, turning an estimated 600 square miles (1,600 km^{2}) of farmland in the area into an enormous lake. More than 1,400 km^{2} (550 mi^{2}) in the Red River Valley were flooded, from Emerson to 60 miles (97 km) north to Greater Winnipeg. The depth of the flood waters on the farmland was between 2–6 feet (0.61–1.83 m). The city turned to the Canadian Army and the Red Cross for help.

Four of eleven bridges in the city were destroyed and approximately 100,000 people had to be evacuated from their homes and businesses. This was the largest evacuation in Canadian history until the 1979 Mississauga train derailment. In Winnipeg there was one fatality; property damage was severe, with losses estimated at between $600 million and more than a billion dollars. The flood postponed opening day for baseball in the Mandak League due to inundation of Osborne Stadium. The league and its president Jimmy Dunn arranged benefit games to raise money for Winnipeg's Flood Fund.

As a result of the damage, the government built the Red River Floodway, to divert flood waters from Winnipeg to more distant portions of the river. The project was completed in 1968 and has been used 20 times. From 1950 to about 1997, it was derogatorily referred to as "Duff's Ditch", after the premier (Dufferin Roblin) that built the floodway. It is estimated to have prevented more than $100 billion (CAD) in cumulative flood damage. The Floodway was designated a National Historic Site of Canada in 2000, and is considered an outstanding engineering achievement both in terms of function and effects.

== United States ==
Flooding in the Red River Valley of the United States resulted in five deaths.

== See also ==
- Red River floods
