= Broadway (Winnipeg) =

Street in Winnipeg, Manitoba, Canada

- Provincial Trunk Highway 1 Trans-Canada Highway
- Broadway highlighted in red
- Maintained by: City of Winnipeg
- Length: 2.3 km (1.4 mi)
- Component highways: PTH 1 (Trans-Canada Highway)
- West end: Route 85 (Portage Ave)
- Major junctions: Route 70 north (Maryland St); Route 70 south (Sherbrook St); Route 62 (Osborne St); Route 42 south (Donald St); Route 42 north (Smith St)
- East end: Route 52 (Main St)

Broadway is a street in the city of Winnipeg, Manitoba, Canada. It is one of the city's oldest and most historic routes and forms the Trans-Canada Highway route through the city's downtown.

The street is located between Main Street and Osborne Street, bookended by the Union Station to the east and the Manitoba Legislative Building to the west. Broadway also functions as an unofficial boundary between the commercial and residential areas in the southern part of downtown.

== Route description ==
Broadway begins at Main Street (Route 52), opposite Union Station, near the confluence of the Red and Assiniboine Rivers. It travels 2.2 kilometres (1.4 mi) west before merging into westbound Portage Avenue (Route 85). The street is divided into two distinct sections to the east and west, which are separated by Osborne Street (Route 62).

To the east is the downtown portion of Broadway, which is a picturesque street with a wide, park-like boulevard and elm canopy. The street passes by several of Winnipeg's oldest buildings, including the Manitoba Legislative Building, Fort Garry Hotel, Provincial Law Courts Building, and many other heritage buildings. Because of its position in the southern part of downtown, the area also functions as a demarcation between commercial development to the north and a residential enclave south to the Assiniboine River.

West of Osborne Street, Broadway enters a residential area known as West Broadway and becomes a four-lane street with no median strip. Osborne Stadium and Shea's Amphitheatre, among the city's earliest sports facilities, were once located in this district near Broadway.

The Trans-Canada Highway (PTH 1) follows the full length of Broadway from Main Street (south) to Portage Avenue (west).

=== Landmarks ===
- Broadway Promenade
- Fort Garry Hotel
- Manitoba Club
- Manitoba Legislative Building
- Provincial Court of Manitoba
- Union Station
- Upper Fort Garry Provincial Park

== History ==
The origin of Broadway predates the city of Winnipeg, beginning as an exclusive residential district known as the Hudson's Bay Reserve.

The large block of land near Upper Fort Garry was originally granted to the Hudson's Bay Company (HBC) by the Government of Canada. Broadway was thereby developed as the main east–west thoroughfare through HBC's land reserve around Upper Fort Garry and connected with the Fort Ellice Trail leading to Edmonton, now known as the Yellowhead Highway. Most of the fort has since been demolished and the only surviving gate has been incorporated into Upper Fort Garry Provincial Park, located at the southwest corner of Broadway and Main Street.

As early as 1873, cottages and other small structures began to appear. By the 1880s, the area became a desirable residential neighborhood for some of Winnipeg's wealthiest families. However, as the early 20th century saw the emergence of several other wealthy residential areas such as Armstrong's Point, Fort Rouge, Crescentwood, Wolseley, and River Heights, Broadway lost many of its elite residents.

With the drastic demographic change, throughout the following decades, many of the area's homes were either subdivided into rooming houses or torn down completely. This would lead to the development of Broadway as the predominantly commercial district it is known as today, signaled by a building boom in the late 1950s to early 1970s. Among others, the locally based but British-funded development firm Metropolitan Estate and Property Corporation (MEPC) was one of the earliest groups dedicated to making Broadway a viable business district, or the "Wall Street of the West". Architecture that arose in the post-1945 development of the area was mostly modernist, designed by various notable firms in Winnipeg.

Prior to the construction of Union Station, Broadway extended to the Red River and connected with St. Boniface via the Broadway Bridge. Today, a pedestrian corridor known as the Broadway Promenade maintains the connection between Broadway and Provencher Boulevard in St. Boniface.

== Major intersections ==
From east to west:

Location	km	mi	Destinations	Notes
Downtown	0.0	0.0	Main Street (Route 52) / PTH 1 (TCH) east – Union Station	PTH 1 branches south onto Main Street (Route 52)
Downtown	0.1	0.062	Fort Street	One-way northbound
Downtown	0.2	0.12	Garry Street – Fort Garry Hotel	One-way southbound
Downtown	0.3	0.19	Smith Street (Route 42 north) – Burton Cummings Theatre	One-way northbound
Downtown	0.4	0.25	Donald Street (Route 42 south)	One-way southbound
Downtown	0.5	0.31	Hargave Street – Canada Life Centre, Cityplace	One-way northbound
Downtown	0.6	0.37	Carlton Street – True North Square	One-way southbound
Downtown	0.7	0.43	Edmonton Street – Convention Centre, Portage Place	One-way northbound
Downtown	0.8	0.50	Kennedy Street	One-way southbound
Downtown	1.0	0.62	Memorial Boulevard – Manitoba Legislative Building	
Downtown	1.2	0.75	Osborne Street (Route 62) – Winnipeg Art Gallery, University of Winnipeg	
West End	1.8	1.1	Sherbrook Street (Route 70 north)	One-way, northbound
West End	2.0	1.2	Maryland Street (Route 70 south)	One-way, southbound
West End	2.3	1.4	Portage Avenue (Route 85) / PTH 1 (TCH) west	PTH 1 branches west onto Portage Avenue (Route 85)
1.000 mi = 1.609 km; 1.000 km = 0.621 mi

== See also ==
- Manitoba Highway 1
