= Cornish Library =

Public library in Winnipeg

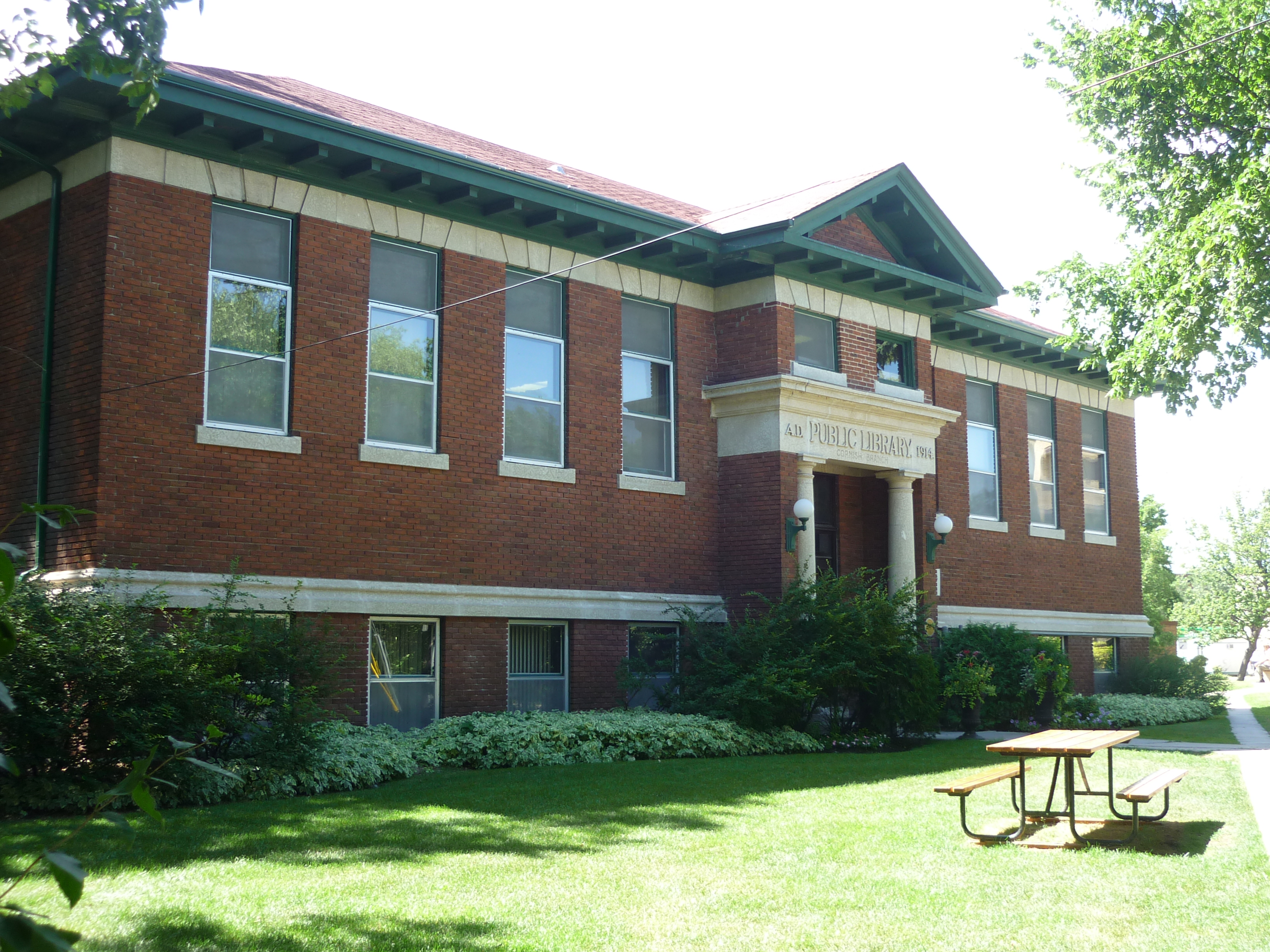
- 49°52.708′N 097°09.593′W
- Location: 20 West Gate; Winnipeg, Manitoba; R3C 2E1, Canada
- Type: Public Library
- Established: June 15, 1915
- Architect: S. Frank Peters
- Service area: Crescentwood, Rockwood, West Broadway
- Branch of: Winnipeg Public Library

Other information
- Director: Rick Watkins, Branch Head
- Website: https://wpl.winnipeg.ca/library/branchpages/branch.aspx?cnsh

The Cornish Library, is a branch of the Winnipeg Public Library, located in Winnipeg, Manitoba, Canada. Like the St. John's Library, the Cornish is one of two Carnegie libraries in the city. It is a Grade II listed building and a Winnipeg Landmark Heritage Structure. It was gazetted on January 15, 1993. It is named in honour of Winnipeg's first mayor, Francis Evans Cornish.

== History ==
Designed by the architect S. Frank Peters, the plans had to be approved by Carnegie's personal secretary, James Bertram, to assure money was not wasted on exterior ornamentation at the expense of book shelves and furniture. The library is located at 20 West Gate in Cornish Park on a small piece of land at one of the entrances to Armstrong's Point, near the Maryland Bridge. It replaced the Winnipeg Waterworks building. It is situated on the eastern bank of the Assiniboine River with the library's west elevation facing the river. The Cornish Baths, Winnipeg's first indoor pool, were formerly located beside the Library.

Construction by the National Construction Company of Winnipeg began in 1914. The library opened on June 15, 1915. The foundation was damaged by flooding in 1918 and it was repaired using a $7,000 Carnegie grant.

The Library underwent a renovation in 2019-20 that included the addition of an all-glass reading area and improved accessibility from the main entrance. The renovation came in at $3.74 million, and the Library officially reopened July 29, 2021.

== Architecture and fittings ==
The library, 430 square metres (4,600 sq ft) in size, was built in keeping with Andrew Carnegie's specifications, being of a simple plan that was characterized by classical details, fenestration and modest interior appointments. Resting on a concrete foundation, it has nearly 4,000 cu. m. (141,074 cu. ft.) of interior space, 75 million bricks, 1,002 superficial sq. m. of plaster, and 229 cu. m. of concrete. The building cost approximately $30,000 - which 100 years later is $807,000 in 2024 Canadian dollars (adjusted for inflation).

=== Exterior ===
The one-storey building is rectangular and has a raised concrete basement. An ornamental, smooth-cut belt encircles both levels. There are red brick walls and limestone details. Sills are made of stone. Windows are tall and rectangular. While the hip roof is low-pitched, a centred front portico and centred rear pavilion have a gabled roof. The main entrance has a pedimented double-door. This is framed by stone columns. A carved entablature includes the words: "PUBLIC LIBRARY", "CORNISH BRANCH", and "A.D. 1914". The pediment on top of the rear pavilion has an oculus with decorative brick and stone detailing. There are block modillions in the pediments and under the eaves. Other features include red brick chimneys with stone caps as well as a brick and stone porch with a gable roof.

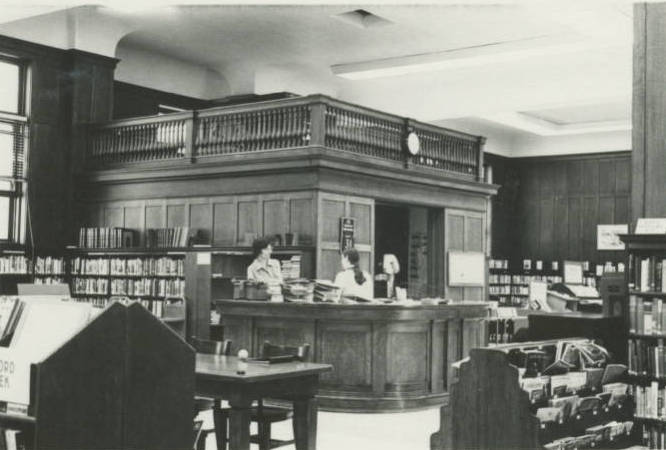
Interior of Cornish Library showing staff at the circulation desk

=== Interior ===
The library has high ceilings and windows. The basement ceilings are 3.7 metres (12 ft), while the main floor ceilings are 5.5 metres (18 ft). The main floor has built-in perimeter bookshelves. Reading areas include partial wall and screened wall areas. The lower level is reached via stairs from the front vestibule. A central hallway in the basement separates lecture rooms. Interior doors are made of oak and glass. Other interior features include solid, wide, oak tables, wood panelling, and tiled fireplaces with oak mantels.

The collections are situated on the main floor while the basement has a program room that seats 60 people.

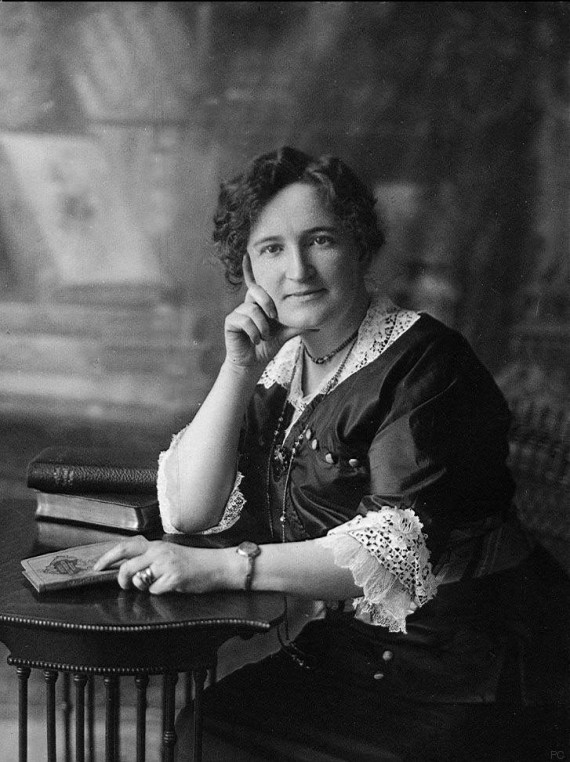
Nellie McClung

== Notable people ==
The Canadian novelist, prohibitionist, and women's rights and reform movement activist Nellie McClung lectured at the Cornish Library.
