= Maryland Bridge =

Twin span bridge in Winnipeg, Manitoba

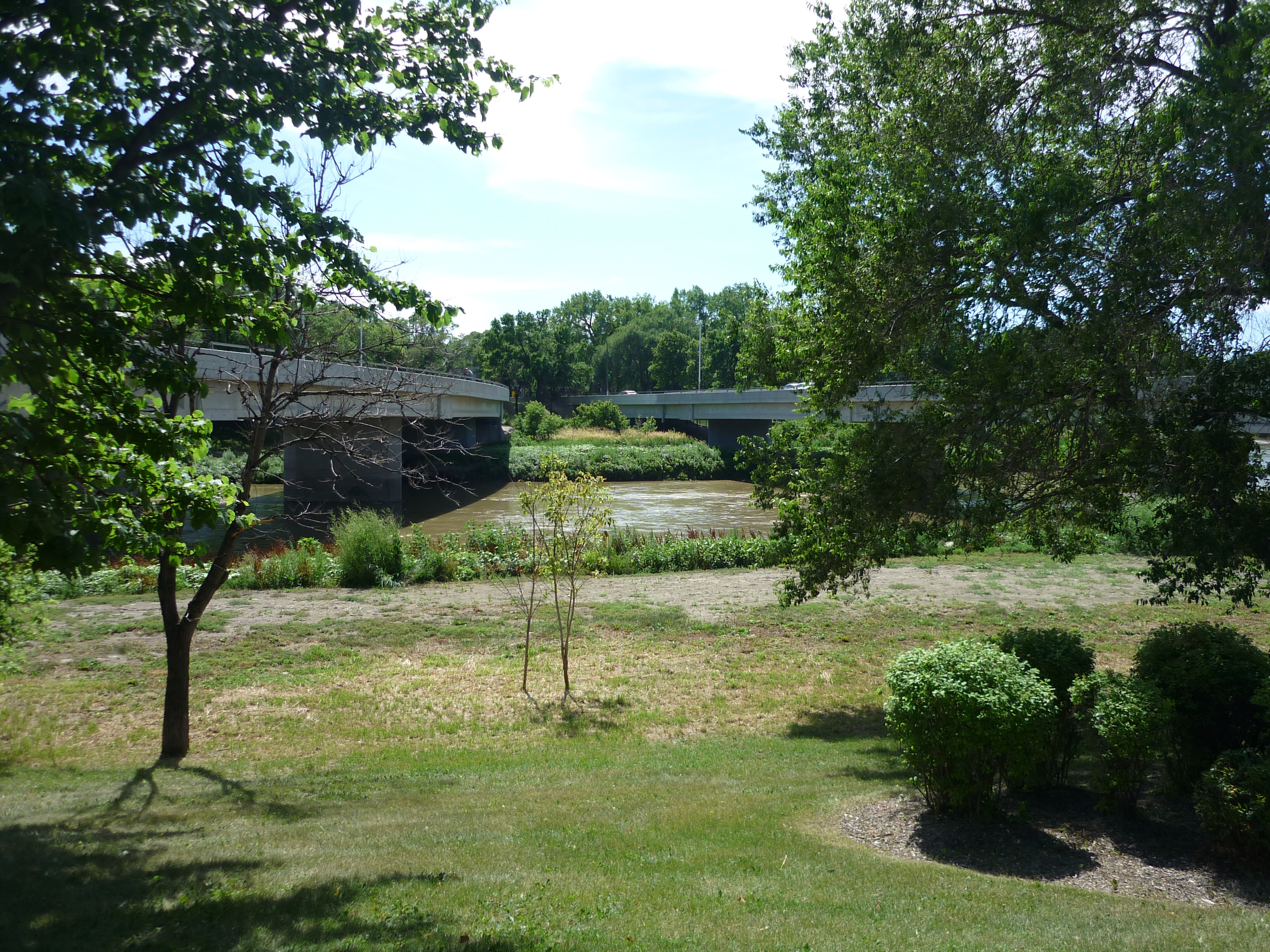
- Coordinates: 49°52′41″N 97°9′40″W
- Carries: Route 70
- Crosses: Assiniboine River
- Locale: Winnipeg, Manitoba
- Maintained by: City of Winnipeg

History
- Construction end: 1969 (southbound side); 1970 (northbound side)

Statistics
- Daily traffic: 25,400 per day (2013)

Location
- Interactive map of Maryland Bridge

The Maryland Bridge is a bridge that crosses over the Assiniboine River in Winnipeg, Manitoba, Canada. It serves as a major transportation route for Winnipeg. The bridge connects Academy Road with Maryland Street and Sherbrook Street. The current structure is the third bridge to span this section of the river. All three bridges were called the Maryland Bridge. Nearby landmarks include Misericordia Health Centre, Cornish Library, and Shaarey Zedek Synagogue.

== History ==
=== Original bridge (1894-1921) ===
The first Maryland Bridge was constructed in 1894 and nicknamed the Boundary Bridge, because Maryland Street once served as Winnipeg's western boundary. In 1915, the city of Winnipeg proposed transforming the bridge into a war memorial though the bridge was decommissioned before this idea came to fruition.

Street car service on the first Maryland Bridge was suspended in June 1920. The bridge previously serviced street car routes 35 and 37. Around the same time, concerns were raised of the safety of the bridge's infrastructure and a ban was put in place on heavy traffic and street cars crossing the bridge. The original Maryland Bridge was decommissioned in 1921 after the completion of construction on the second bridge.

=== Second bridge (1921-1969) ===
After a Census of Traffic was conducted on the original bridge because of increased traffic and safety concerns, construction began on the second Maryland Bridge in 1920, and was completed in 1921. In 1951, construction was completed on the Maryland Bridge Cut-Off, a project to cut down on congestion by allowing drivers to turn right off the bridge onto Wellington Crescent without having to wait for a green light.

In 1923, D. L. Saberton committed suicide by jumping from the Maryland Bridge and was the second person to die jumping from the bridge that week. An unnamed man also committed suicide jumping from the bridge in 1925.

The bridge was closed for demolition in 1969 upon the opening of the Twin Bridge's western span. The second bridge is memorialized by the Maryland Twin Bridge Monument, located south of the current Maryland Bridge. The monument consists of a corner post shaped as a cairn that was preserved from the second Maryland Bridge.

=== Current bridge (1969-present) ===
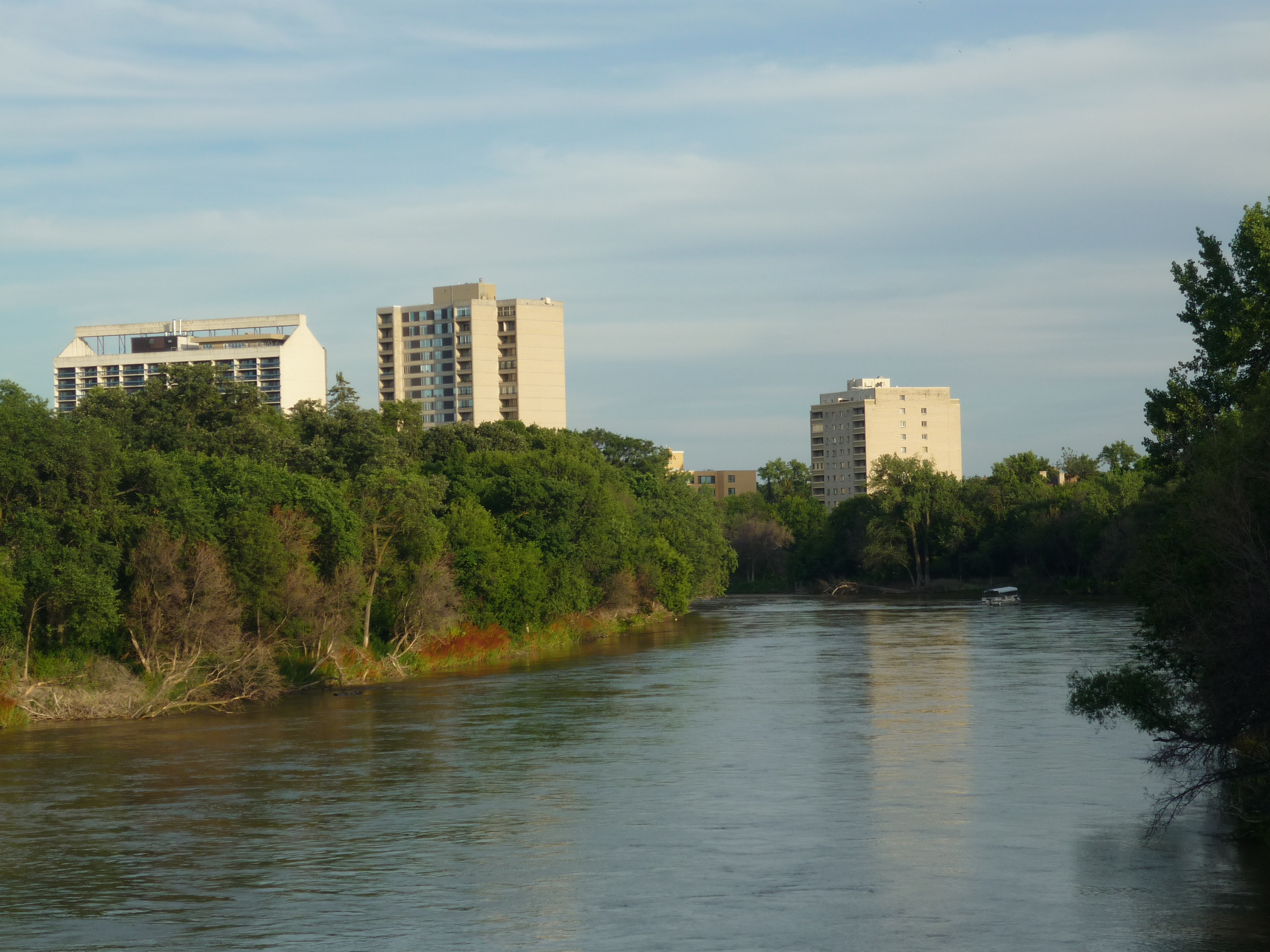
A view of the Assiniboine River looking southeast from the bridge

The current iteration of the Maryland Bridge was opened to traffic in two stages. The west structure on 8 November 1969 and the east structure on 5 August 1970. It was financed by the provincial government and constructed by the Metropolitan Corporation of Greater Winnipeg. In 2013, the Maryland Bridge was the 13th busiest bridge, out of 15, in Winnipeg with an average of 25,400 cars driving over the bridge per day.

The Maryland Bridge was part of the route of the first Manitoba Marathon in 1979, though it is no longer on the marathon route.

Since 1995, the Maryland Bridge has been the site of the Misericordia Health Centre Foundation’s annual Angel Squad fundraiser. As part of the fundraiser, volunteers line the bridge in the early morning dressed as angels offering coffee to drivers in exchange for donations. In 2015, the Angel Squad beat the Guinness World Record for the largest gathering of angels.

In 2007, Doug Prysiazniuk was killed while performing maintenance on the bridge. Prysiazniuk's death delayed bridge maintenance and was ultimately declared an accident.

The space underneath the Maryland Bridge has regularly been a shelter for Winnipeg's homeless. In May 2019, police ordered those living beneath the bridge to leave. Homeless individuals later returned to the bridge despite police orders to dismantle camps. In October 2019, a fire broke out beneath the bridge, though it caused no structural damage to the bridge and left behind no injuries. In the spring of 2020, the city of Winnipeg began testing noise makers to deter homeless camps underneath the bridge. The project was discontinued in June after criticism from city councillors and citizens about the rights and dignity of the homeless population. In August, 2021, a small trash fire broke out under the bridge, once again leaving no injuries.

The Maryland Bridge has been used as a site for honouring missing and murdered Indigenous women and girls. In the 2010s, red ribbons were tied to bridges across Winnipeg, with each ribbon representing a missing or murdered Indigenous woman. The ribbons were subsequently removed from the Maryland Bridge by unknown parties. Indigenous men's support group Healing Together found and replaced the missing ribbons in early 2021.

== Architecture ==
=== Original bridge ===
The first bridge was made of steel truss. This iteration of the Maryland Bridge was described by the Winnipeg Free Press as having a "Renaissance character" with "classic mouldings and features".

=== Second bridge ===
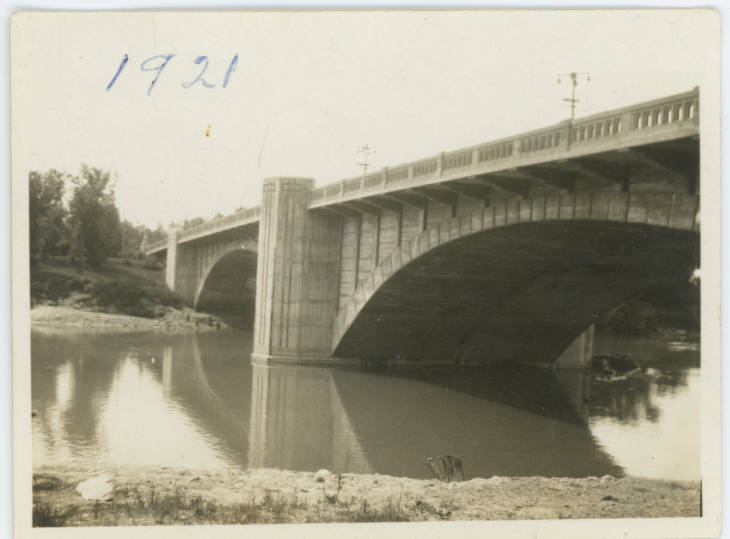
The Maryland Twin Bridge shortly after completion of its construction in 1921

The second bridge was a concrete arch structure that included a coloured aggregate of red granite, crushed to pass through a .75 inches (19 mm) screen, exposed by scrubbing with steel brushes, and cleaned by several washings of muriatic acid and water.

=== Current bridge ===
The current bridge consists of I-shaped AASHTO girders and twin, five-span continuous precast prestressed concrete structures. Renovations to the northbound span occurred in 2005. In 2006, the southbound span was renovated.
