= River Heights, Winnipeg =

Neighbourhood in south Winnipeg, Manitoba

River Heights
- Suburb
- Interactive map of River Heights
- Coordinates: 49°51′51″N 97°11′20″W
- Country: Canada
- Province: Manitoba
- City: Winnipeg
- Neighbourhoods: 17, including: Crescentwood; Grant Park; Rockwood; Wellington Crescent

Government
  - MP: Ben Carr (Winnipeg South Centre)
  - MLA: Mike Moroz (River Heights)
  - Councillor: John Orlikow (River Heights – Fort Garry)

Area
  - Suburb: 18.1 km^{2} (7.0 sq mi)
  - Metro: 475.2 km^{2} (183.5 sq mi)

Population (2016)
  - Suburb: 57,375
  - Density: 3,170/km^{2} (8,210/sq mi)
  - Metro: 778,489
- Time zone: UTC-6 (Central Standard Time)
  - Summer (DST): UTC-5 (Central Daylight Time)
- Forward sortation area: R3N
- Area codes: 204, 431

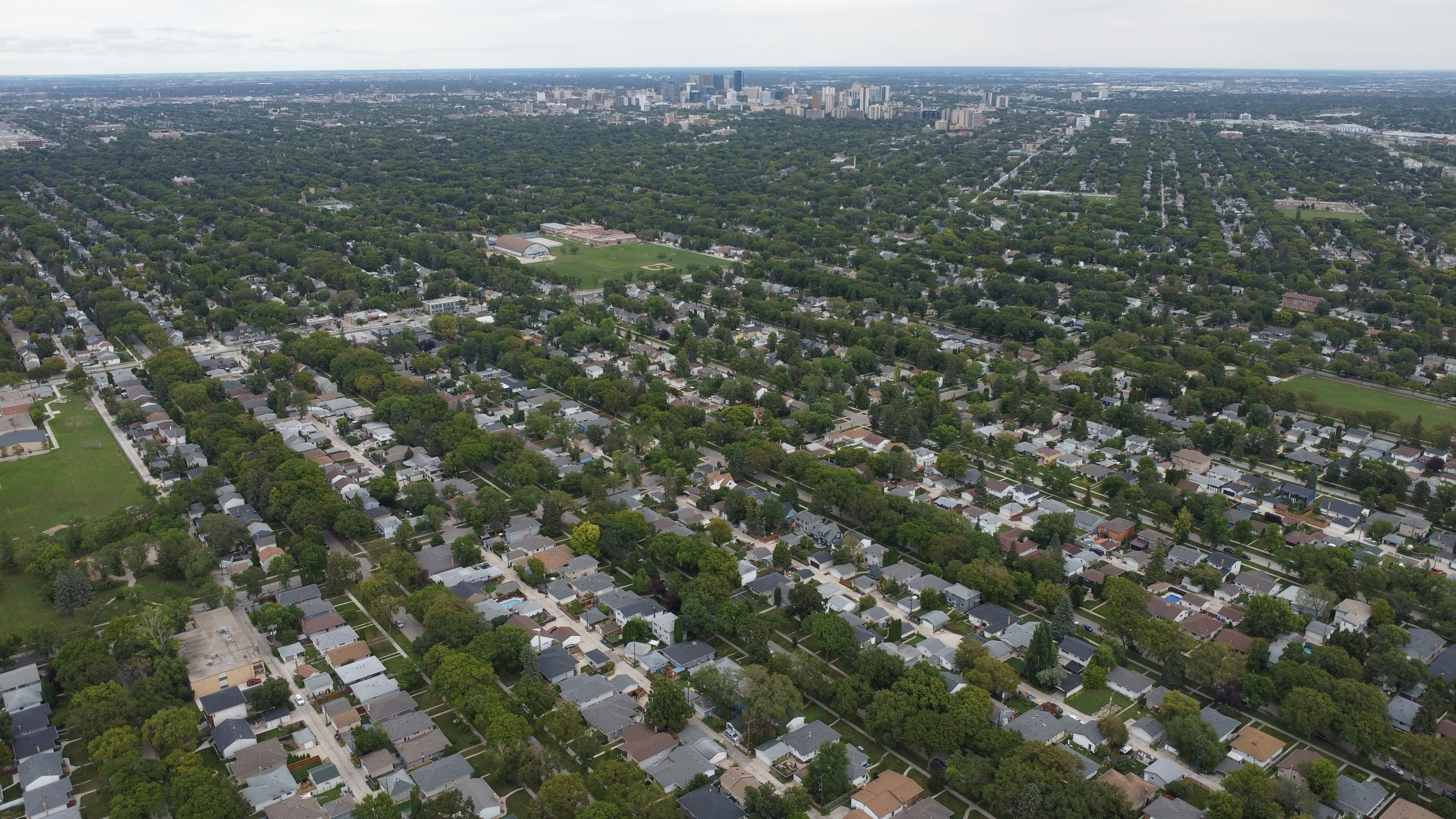
A view of River Heights, Further ahead is downtown Winnipeg

River Heights is a suburb and community area in Winnipeg, Manitoba. It is bordered by Route 90 to the west, the Assiniboine River to the north, the Red River to the east, and the CN tracks to the south.

== History ==
The land of present-day River Heights was once part of the Parish of St. Boniface. It was annexed by the City of Winnipeg in 1882, though substantial development did not occur in the area until after World War I.

Some streets at the eastern end of River Heights are named after types of deciduous trees, Oak, Elm, Ash, while others are named after places, Waterloo (1881), Montrose, Oxford.

River Heights, along with West Fort Rouge, comprised the South End of the old City of Winnipeg. It was these areas that contributed the majority of the men and the money to form the Citizens Committee of 1000, the group that broke the Winnipeg General Strike of 1919.

== Demographics ==
Population history
Year	Pop.	±%
1971	70,650	—
1976	65,400	−7.4%
1981	61,035	−6.7%
1986	60,645	−0.6%
1991	58,090	−4.2%
1996	57,685	−0.7%
2001	56,240	−2.5%
2006	56,505	+0.5%
2011	56,225	−0.5%
2016	57,375	+2.0%

In 2016, the population of River Heights was 57,375, (18,995 not including "East River Heights from Census definition) has been constantly going down since 1971 when the population was 70,650, other than the 0.5% increase from 2001 to 2006. The median household income in River Heights is $47,646, slightly lower than the city-average at $49,790.

Though the neighbourhood was traditionally an Anglo-Saxon Protestant area, today the area has a more diverse population, featuring a significant Jewish presence, which makes up 11% of the neighbourhood's population.

=== Racial demographics ===
River Heights community area population by race, 2016
Population group		Population	% of population
Non-visible minority or Aboriginal (White)		43,810	76.4%
Visible minority	Filipino	2,005	3.5%
Visible minority	South Asian	1,535	2.7%
Visible minority	Black	1,380	2.4%
Visible minority	Chinese	955	1.7%
Visible minority	Southeast Asian	245	0.4%
Visible minority	Latin American	745	1.3%
Visible minority	Arab	240	0.4%
Visible minority	Korean	335	0.6%
Visible minority	West Asian	285	0.5%
Visible minority	Japanese	230	0.4%
Visible minority	Multiple visible minorities	375	0.7%
Visible minority	Other	225	0.4%
Total visible minority population		8,555	14.9%
Aboriginal identity	Métis*	3,035	5.3%
Aboriginal identity	First Nations (North American Indian)*	1,810	3.2%
Aboriginal identity	Inuk (Inuit)*	35	0.1%
Aboriginal identity	Multiple Aboriginal identities	90	0.2%
Aboriginal identity	Other Aboriginal identities	40	0.1%
Total aboriginal population		5,010	8.7%
Total population		57,375	100%
* single identity

== Points of interest ==
River Heights is part of the Winnipeg School Division, and includes the following schools:

- Brock-Corydon Elementary School
- J. B. Mitchell School
- Montrose Elementary School
- Queenston Elementary School
- River Heights School
- Robert H. Smith Elementary School
- Ecole Sir William Osler

Private schools in the area include St. John Brebeuf School.

For sports/athletics, the area has the River Heights Community Club and the Sir John Franklin Community Club. Other points of interest include River Heights Public Library, Grant Park Shopping Centre (including McNally Robinson Booksellers), Pan Am Pool, and Manitoba Electrical Museum.

Major streets of River Heights include Academy Road and Stafford Street.

== Neighbourhoods ==
River Heights is divided into two neighbourhood clusters: River Heights West and River Heights East, which encompass 17 neighbourhoods in Winnipeg in total.

River Heights East

- Lord Roberts
- McMillan
- River-Osborne
- Riverview
- Roslyn
River Heights West
- Central River Heights
- Crescentwood
- Earl Grey
- Ebby-Wentworth
- Grant Park
- J.B. Mitchell
- Mathers
- North River Heights
- Rockwood
- Sir John Franklin
- South River Heights
- Wellington Crescent

=== Crime rates ===
River Heights is known to be one of the safer urban areas of Winnipeg. The table below shows the crime rates of various crimes in each of the River Heights neighbourhoods. The crime data spans 5 years from the year 2017 to the year 2021. The rates are crimes per 100,000 residents per year.

Crime Rates per 100,000 people in River Heights Neighbourhoods, 2017-2021
Neighbourhood	Pop.	Homicide	Rate (Note: Rate per 100,000 people per year: Figure is calculated by dividing the total incidences of a crime by the neighbourhood population, then multiplying by 100,000, and then dividing by 5, as the data spans 5 years)	Robbery	Rate	Agr. Aslt. (Note: Aggravated assault: Includes assaults which cause bodily harm or utilize weapons; includes the following categories given on Winnipeg CrimeMaps: aggravated assault, aggravated sexual assault, assault against peace officer, assault with weapon or causing bodily harm, attempted murder, firearms offences, sexual assault with a weapon.)	Rate	Cmn. Aslt (Note: Common assault: Excludes assaults which cause bodily harm or utilize weapons; includes the following categories given on Winnipeg CrimeMaps: assault against peace officer, common assault, other assaults, sexual assault.)	Rate	Utt. Threat (Note: Abbreviated from: uttering threats)	Rate	Property	Rate
Central River Heights	3,340	0	0.0	5	29.9	5	29.9	22	131.7	2	12.0	927	5,550.9
J.B. Mitchell	2,270	0	0.0	13	114.5	3	26.4	15	132.2	2	17.6	534	4,704.8
Mathers	2,680	0	0.0	4	29.9	5	37.3	14	104.5	1	7.5	475	3,544.8
North River Heights	5,615	0	0.0	10	35.6	3	10.7	18	64.1	9	32.1	1818	6,475.5
Sir John Franklin	2,425	0	0.0	3	24.7	10	82.5	41	338.1	5	41.2	774	6,383.5
South River Heights	2,665	0	0.0	0	0.0	17	127.6	26	195.1	8	60.0	1171	8,788.0
Wellington Crescent	1,655	0	0.0	28	338.4	7	84.6	27	326.3	3	36.3	870	10,513.6
River Heights	20,650	0	0.0	63	61.0	50	48.4	163	157.9	30	29.1	6,569	6,362.2
