= Manitoba Club =

Private club in Winnipeg, Manitoba

- Formation: 16 July 1874; 152 years ago
- Type: Private club
- Headquarters: 194 Broadway
- Website: manitobaclub.mb.ca

The Manitoba Club is private club in Winnipeg, Manitoba, Canada. Established as a gentleman's club in 1874, the Manitoba Club is the oldest private club in Western Canada.

== History ==
On 16 July 1874, ten men met at the St. James Restaurant in Winnipeg to organize a club where city leaders could meet and relax. The Manitoba Club was incorporated one month later, becoming the first private club in Western Canada.

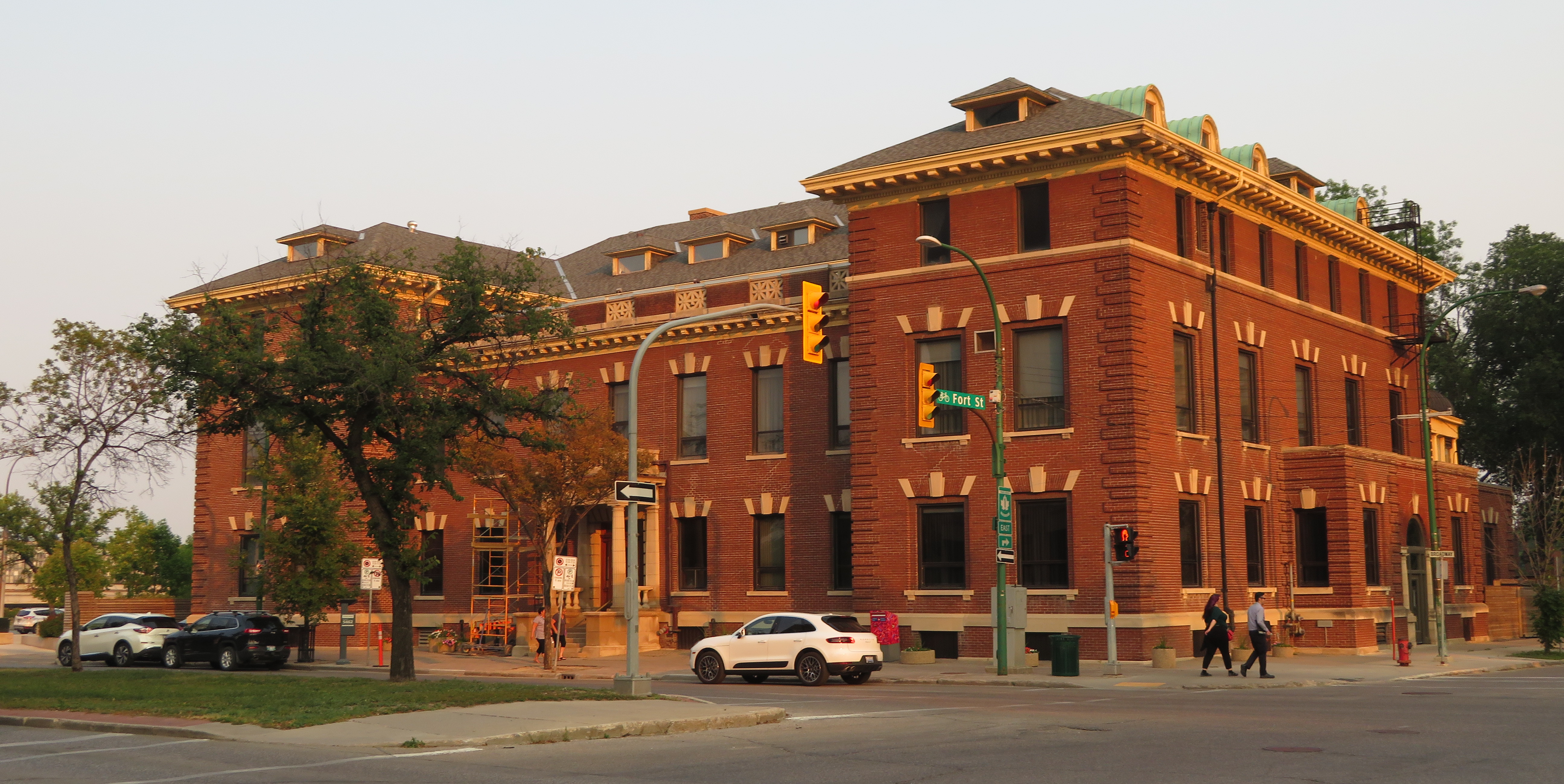
The clubhouse opened on 10 October 1905. It was designed by S. F. & W. A. Peters.

The first clubhouse was founded in a rented building. This building burned down in February 1875 when Winnipeg’s first steam fire engine, on its inaugural run, failed to get there in time. Within six weeks, a new location was found, serving the club for 6 years. The third clubhouse was owned by the club and located on Garry Street, later being sold to Donald E. McKenty for $30,000, and then sold again three weeks later to Fred Richardson for $35,000.

Dignitaries who have visited the club include Mark Twain, General William Tecumseh Sherman, Princes of Monaco, Jordan and Iran, every Canadian prime minister through the 1940s, the British High Commissioner and many others.

Sir Hugh John Macdonald, the son of Canada's first Prime Minister, served as President of the Manitoba Club from 1896 to 1899—shortly before the construction of its current location. Around this time, he also became the leader of the fledgling Manitoba Conservative Party in 1897, and was elected the 8th Premier of Manitoba in December 1899, as MLA for Winnipeg South.

In November 1902, the Club purchased three lots at 194 Broadway from the Hudson’s Bay Company for $8,000. The Club announced in April 1904 that it would be moving from 298 Garry Street to a new building at the corner of Broadway and Fort Street. Two months later, the building's foundation was laid. The neoclassical-style building was officially opened by Sir Albert Henry George Grey, 4th Earl Grey, Governor General of Canada, on 10 October 1905, and exists as the Club's current residence.

The Institute for Stained Glass in Canada has documented the stained glass at the Manitoba Club.

In 2017, the Club made plans to add a Cigar Room on the top floor. No other private club in Canada has such.

== See also ==
- Gentlemen's club
- List of gentlemen's clubs in Canada
