= Winnipeg Route 57 =

Major road in Winnipeg, Manitoba, Canada

Route 57
- Dublin Avenue; Notre Dame Avenue / Cumberland Avenue; Carlton Street / Portage Avenue; Westbrook Street; William Stephenson Way / Pioneer Avenue; Provencher Boulevard (Boulevard Provencher)
- Route 57 highlighted in red
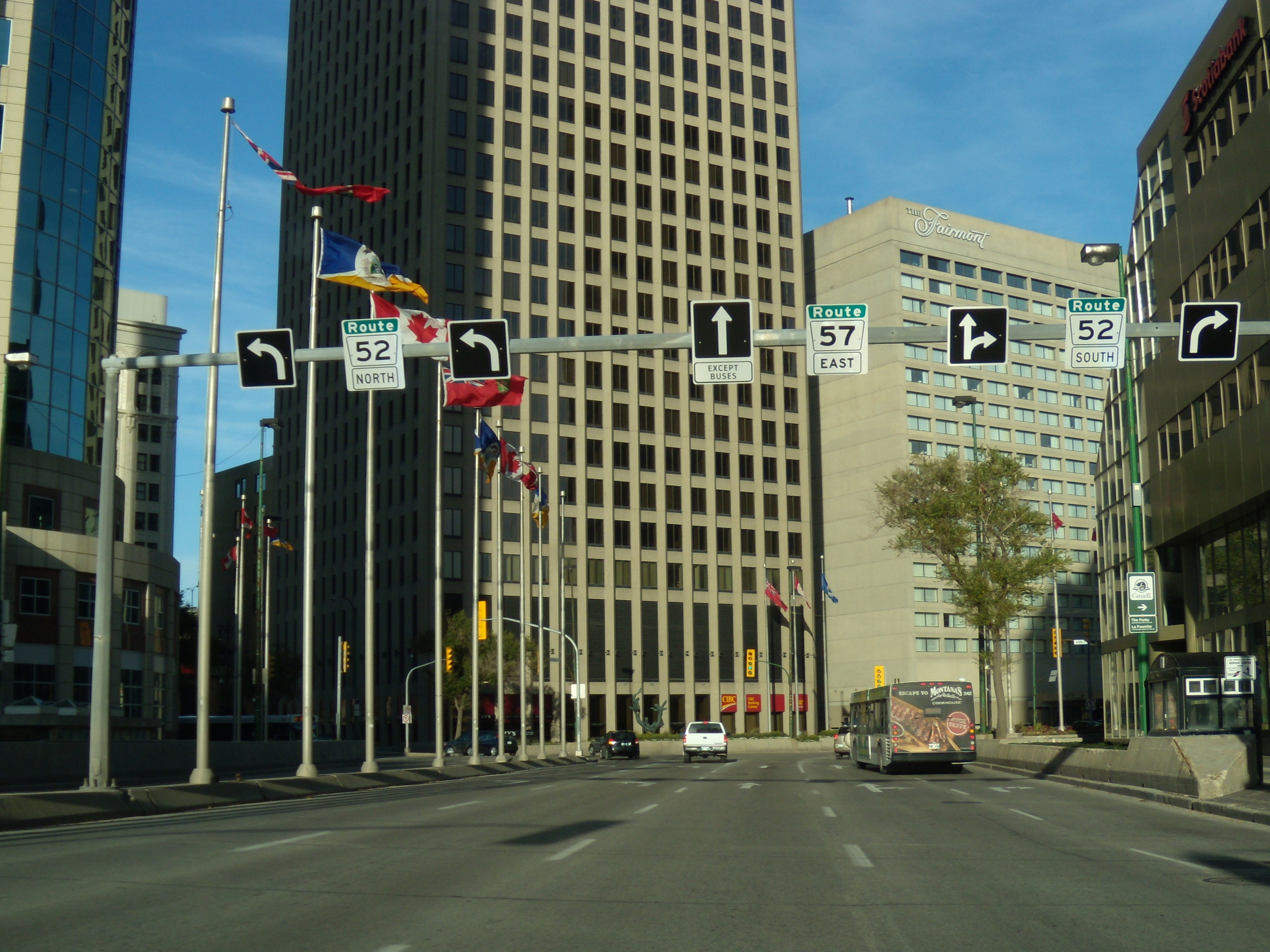
- Corner of Portage and Main as seen from eastbound Portage Ave (Route 57)

Route information
- Maintained by City of Winnipeg
- Length: 8.4 km (5.2 mi)
- Existed: 1966–present
- Known for: Junction of Portage and Main

Major junctions
- West end: Route 90 (King Edward St)
- Route 180 north (McPhillips St); Route 70 south (Maryland St); Route 70 north (Sherbrook St); Route 62 (Balmoral St); Route 42 south (Donald St); Route 42 north (King St); Route 85 west (Portage Ave); Route 52 south (Main St)
- East end: Route 30 (Archibald St)

Location
- Country: Canada
- Province: Manitoba

Highway system
- Provincial highways in Manitoba; Winnipeg City Routes
← Route 52	→ Route 62

Route 57 is a major road located in Winnipeg, Manitoba. It connects the suburbs of St. James and St. Boniface with the West End and the downtown core.

== Route description ==
Route 57 begins as Dublin Avenue at Route 90 in the St. James Industrial Area near the Winnipeg airport. It follows Dublin Avenue, then diverts onto eastbound Notre Dame Avenue. Between Sherbrook Street and Portage Avenue, Route 57 follows different streets, Notre Dame Avenue (westbound), Fort Street (northbound), or Cumberland Avenue (eastbound) and Carlton Street (southbound). The westbound route passes through the Exchange District.

East of Portage Avenue, Route 57 passes by Shaw Park and The Forks as it follows Pioneer Avenue (westbound) or William Stephenson Way (eastbound) via Main Street. It crosses the Provencher Bridge into St. Boniface and follows Provencher Boulevard, the main street of Old St. Boniface. It crosses the Seine River before ending at Archibald Street.

== History ==
Dublin Avenue is named after the Irish capital. Notre Dame Avenue (not to be confused with Notre Dame Street in St. Boniface) was named for a girls' school which was located on the road (it later moved to Academy Road). William Stephenson Way (formerly Water Avenue) is named after the British-Canadian spy, who was born in Winnipeg.

Provencher Boulevard (French: Boulevard Provencher) is named for Norbert Provencher, the first Roman Catholic Bishop of St. Boniface. Many city heritage buildings, including the former St. Boniface City Hall, are located along this street.

== Major intersections ==
From west to east: The entire route is in Winnipeg.

Street Name	km	mi	Destinations	Notes
Dublin Avenue	0.0	0.0	King Edward Street (Route 90) / Dublin Avenue – Airport	Route 57 western terminus; Dublin Avenue continues west
Dublin Avenue	0.5	0.31	St. James Street	
Notre Dame Avenue	1.2	0.75	Notre Dame Avenue	Route 57 branches east onto Notre Dame Avenue
Notre Dame Avenue	1.2	0.75	Midland Street	Eastbound right-in/right-out
Notre Dame Avenue	1.7	1.1	Weston Street	
Notre Dame Avenue	1.75	1.09	Erin Street	One-way, southbound
Notre Dame Avenue	1.9	1.2	Wall Street	One-way northbound (no access, T-intersection)
Notre Dame Avenue	2.6	1.6	McPhillips Street (Route 180 north)	
Notre Dame Avenue	2.9	1.8	Arlington Street	
Notre Dame Avenue	3.4	2.1	Emily Street – Health Sciences Centre	
Notre Dame Avenue (westbound); Cumberland Avenue (eastbound)	3.6	2.2	Maryland Street (Route 70 south)	One-way, southbound
Notre Dame Avenue (westbound); Cumberland Avenue (eastbound)	3.6	2.2	One-way transition	Route 57 east follows Cumberland Avenue
Notre Dame Avenue (westbound); Cumberland Avenue (eastbound)	3.8	2.4	Sherbrook Street (Route 70 north)	Route 70 northern terminus; one-way, northbound south of Notre Dame Avenue (Route 57 east)
Notre Dame Avenue (westbound); Cumberland Avenue (eastbound)	4.3	2.7	Balmoral Street / Isabel Street (Route 62)	
Notre Dame Avenue (westbound); Carlton Street (eastbound)	4.6	2.9	Carlton Street / Cumberland Avenue	Route 57 east turns onto Carlton Street; one-way, southbound
Notre Dame Avenue (westbound); Carlton Street (eastbound)	4.9	3.0	Ellice Avenue	Access from Route 57 east
Notre Dame Avenue (westbound); Portage Avenue (eastbound)	5.1	3.2	Portage Avenue (Route 85) / YH / Carlton Street	Route 57 east turns onto Portage Avenue (two-way traffic); west end of Route 57 east / Route 85 concurrency; to PTH 1 west
Notre Dame Avenue (westbound); Portage Avenue (eastbound)	5.2	3.2	Hargrave Street	One-way, northbound
Notre Dame Avenue (westbound); Portage Avenue (eastbound)	5.3	3.3	Donald Street (Route 42 south)	One-way, southbound
Notre Dame Avenue (westbound); Portage Avenue (eastbound)	5.4	3.4	Smith Street / King Street (Route 42 north)	One-way, northbound
Notre Dame Avenue (westbound); Portage Avenue (eastbound)	5.5	3.4	Garry Street	One-way, southbound
Notre Dame Avenue (westbound); Portage Avenue (eastbound)	5.5	3.4	Ellice Avenue	Access from Route 57 west
Portage Avenue	5.6	3.5	Notre Dame Avenue (Route 57 west) / Fort Street	West end of Route 57 west / Route 85 concurrency; one-way northbound (westbound); Route 57 west turns onto Notre Dame Avenue from Portage Avenue
Portage Avenue	5.7	3.5	Main Street (Route 52) / Route 85 ends / YH ends	See Portage and Main; Route 85 / Yellowhead Highway eastern terminus
Westbrook Street	6.0	3.7	Westbrook Street – Shaw Park	Route 57 turns onto Westbrook Street
Pioneer Avenue (westbound); William Stephenson Way (eastbound)	6.05– 6.10	3.76– 3.79	Pioneer Avenue / William Stephenson Way	One-way pair; Route 52 west follows Pioneer Avenue; Route 52 east follows William Stephenson Way
Provencher Boulevard	6.4	4.0	Waterfront Drive / Israel Asper Way	Access to Canadian Museum for Human Rights and The Forks
Provencher Boulevard	6.4	4.0	One-way transition	Becomes Provencher Boulevard
Provencher Boulevard	6.8	4.2	Provencher Bridge crosses the Red River	
Provencher Boulevard	7.0	4.3	Tache Avenue	
Provencher Boulevard	7.9	4.9	Thibault Street / Des Meurons Street	
Provencher Boulevard	8.4	5.2	Archibald Street (Route 30)	Route 57 eastern terminus
1.000 mi = 1.609 km; 1.000 km = 0.621 mi: Concurrency terminus; Incomplete access; Route transition
