= St. Mary's Academy (Winnipeg) =

Location
- 550 Wellington Crescent; Winnipeg, Manitoba, R3M 0C1; Canada; 49°52′32″N 97°9′52″W

Information
- School type: Private girls-only school
- Motto: Teneamus Altam Facem (Hold High the Torch)
- Religious affiliation: Catholic
- Founded: May 1, 1869
- School district: Manitoba Catholic Schools
- President: Michelle Klus (interim)
- Dean: Lorne Hess
- Principle: Carol-Ann Swayzie
- Grades: 7–12
- Enrollment: 600
- Language: English
- Colours: Navy blue and blue plaid
- Team name: Flames
- Website: www.stmarysacademy.mb.ca

St. Mary's Academy is a private Catholic girls' school in Winnipeg, Manitoba, Canada. It was founded by the Grey Nuns in 1869, with the Sisters of the Holy Names of Jesus and Mary assuming responsibility for the school in 1874. In the late 1960s, the school became primarily focused on education of junior and senior high school girls. In 2014 the school transitioned to lay leadership, with SNJM participating on the Stewardship Council (SMA Stewardship).

The school moved to its present location in 1903. At that time the school sat out on the prairie in an undeveloped area. However, within a few years, the quickly expanding Winnipeg had enveloped the school. St. Mary's Academy went through several expansions in the years that followed.

Today the school has around 600 female students and roughly 50 faculty members.

== History ==
=== The foundation period ===
In 1869 Winnipeg was a straggling frontier village in the Red River Settlement. On May 1 of that year, at the request of Archbishop Alexandre-Antonin Taché, two Grey Nuns opened the first Catholic school in Winnipeg, St. Mary's Academy, to serve the English-speaking Catholics on the west side of the Red River across from St. Boniface. The academy was located in a rented house on Victoria Street near the centre of population between the intersection of Portage and Main and The Forks, the junction of the Red and Assiniboine Rivers. The convent chapel also became home to St. Mary's Catholic Church until August 1874, when a church was built at the corner of St. Mary Avenue and Hargrave. In the spring of 1873, when the new province of Manitoba assumed responsibility for education, St. Mary's began to receive public funding.

Because the arrangement with the Grey Nuns was a temporary one, in 1874 Archbishop Taché recruited the Sisters of the Holy Names of Jesus and Mary, a teaching congregation from Quebec, to work in education in the diocese. On August 22, 1874, four Sisters of the Holy Names arrived from Montréal to assume responsibility for St. Mary's Academy. When the school opened on August 29, 1874, 19 students came to register: 12 girls and 7 boys. In later weeks the enrollment grew to 126, including 50 boys. The following year, three Christian Brothers came to Winnipeg and began a school for boys on Hargrave Street (the beginnings of St. Mary's School). Boys were not seen within the walls of the academy again until 1915 when, by special request from the archbishop, they were accepted into grades one and two until 1950.

=== The Brick Academy ===
Enrollment at the girls school increased rapidly and the first St. Mary's Academy on Victoria Street was soon filled to capacity. In 1876 a second small house, called The Annex, was erected, but continued overcrowding necessitated a move to larger quarters on Notre Dame East in 1881, to which a wing was added in 1892. The opening of this second Academy coincided with the period in Manitoba's history known as The Boom. Despite the fact that the Manitoba School Act of 1890 removed all public support from Catholic schools, forcing them to become private institutions, registration of resident and day students continued to grow at SMA. Once again the facility became inadequate and the Sisters searched for a new location for the third Academy, away from the crowded, noisy, commercial core of the city.

=== A New Academy in Crescentwood ===
A 15-acre (6.1 ha) site was purchased in Crescentwood for a new academy designed by Samuel Hooper. On August 31, 1902, the cornerstone for the Wellington Crescent Academy was blessed. The Edward Cass Construction Company took the better part of a year to complete the building at an estimated cost of $75,000. The new academy, shaped like a “U” was an elaborate structure four stories high with solid brick walls and a mansard roof. The top floor was one large dormitory for students. The Manitoba Free Press questioned why the Sisters built so far out on the prairies. On September 6, 1903, the school opened with 27 Sisters, 148 borders and 48 day students.

In 1904 land was sold to the city of Winnipeg to extend Stafford Street and to the Winnipeg School Division for Kelvin High School.

=== 1909–1963 ===
By 1909 another addition was needed. The 66-by-120-foot (20 m × 37 m) four storey over stone basement, costing about $80,000, was designed by J.A. Senecal and J.A. Hudon and built by Senecal and Smith. The annex was 18 feet (5.5 m) wider than the original building. This change in width was hidden on the Academy Road side by a large tower housing a staircase. The fourth floor was an extension of the dormitories. The south side of the first floor housed the music department with 25 pianos. A substantial amount of piling work was undertaken during the 1930s to address cracking foundations and other damage.

In 1926 St. Mary's became affiliated with the University of Manitoba and began functioning as St. Mary's Academy and College. At the time, St. Mary's was the West's only Catholic institution where the full college course was offered to women. A pupil entering kindergarten could continue through college without change of school.

During the 1930s the school survived the ever-increasing taxes on the property, accentuated by the depression, and launched a new period of steady growth in the post-war era.

=== Another expansion ===
In June 1960 the boarding school closed, ending a ninety-year-old tradition, and the elementary grades and the college were phased out to help reduce crowding. But, as enrollment continued to climb, a third expansion was necessary. The 1964 addition, a large wing including a theatre, library, fine arts studio and gym, was inspired by a desire to enrich the school culturally. By the end of the decade the academy was a junior and senior high school for day students.

=== The last five decades ===
In the last decades of the 20th century other changes were made to keep up with the times and to meet the needs of students. In 1969 the ornate chapel was altered to in accord with the liturgical renewal mandated by Vatican Council II. In May 1971, the Commercial or Secretarial department, which began in 1904, closed and the academic program became oriented more to preparation for post-secondary education. In 1981 the music rooms were eliminated to make way for additional classrooms and home economics labs.

While the school grew it became increasingly clear that the role of the Sisters was changing. In December 1979 St. Mary's Academy Inc. was incorporated in the province of Manitoba and a Board of Directors, whose members included parents, alumnae, friends of the academy and Sisters of the Holy Names of Jesus and Mary, assumed responsibility for the school. By the 1980s most Sisters had been replaced by lay teachers, many of whom were themselves alumnae. In 1985 the director/principal administration model was adopted and the first director and lay principal were named. As the century drew to a close, in June 1999, the last few Sisters living in residence moved out.

The space vacated by the Sisters presented the school with new opportunity. In 2002 the 1909 wing underwent major renovations and upgrades once again. Four new science labs were built on the fourth floor and the old labs in the basement were converted into home economics labs. Two classrooms were added and the entire building was air-conditioned and brought up to current building and fire code standards. Today, St. Mary's Academy remains the oldest, continuously operating, independent school in the province. The school is not noted for its commitment to young women or for providing exceptional academic, religious, and extra-curricular programs.

=== Recent expansion ===
The school went through another expansion, opening up a new library, fitness center, new art studio, and with a few other large expansions still to be completed. The new art lab has drafting tables, pottery wheels, a Mac lab, and Wacom tablets.

The school is officially opened its new dramatic arts wing complete with props studio, make up/dressing rooms, and costume lab, in September 2013.

== Academy life ==
=== Athletics ===
SMA has an active and extensive Athletic program. It includes the following:

- Cross Country
- Curling
- Volleyball
- Ice Hockey
- Basketball
- Outdoor Soccer
- Indoor Soccer
- Badminton
- Rugby
- Track & Field
- Golf

St. Mary's Rugby team won the title of City Champion in May 2011, and the Golf, Cross-Country, And Volleyball Provincial Championships for the 2011–2012 Season.

The women's ice hockey team has also represented Canada in bandy.

=== Academics ===
Courses are based on the curriculum approved by Manitoba Education, Citizenship and Youth. SMA offers a variety of courses to meet student learning needs and interests. At each grade level particular emphasis is placed on the core subjects English and mathematics.

The religious education program is a key component of both the academic curriculum and the religious culture at SMA. Students are required to successfully complete 1/2 credit in religious studies each year.

Students in all grade levels must complete one grade before advancing to the next at St. Mary's Academy.

== Campus ==
St. Mary's Academy is located on 11.5 acres (4.7 ha) in a park-like setting in the heart of Winnipeg. The original five-story building, with the main entrance facing Wellington Crescent, opened in 1903. This building is used primarily for offices and work space for the school staff and the Sisters of the Holy Names. It also includes Holy Names Chapel and a 100-seat auditorium. In 1909 a larger building was attached that houses most of the 21 classrooms as well as the Richardson Science Wing, the human ecology department and a computer lab. Recent renovations and upgrades to meet building code standards and to enhance programs left intact the traditional architecture wherever possible, and also incorporated up-to-date technology, furnishings and equipment, and resulted in a more comfortable learning environment with improved lighting and air-conditioning.

Another wing was opened in October 1964. It includes Alumnae Hall, a library, a fine arts studio, the Sister Rita Maureen Gym, a cafeteria and a computer lab. The gym is home to the St. Mary's Academy Flames while Alumnae Hall, a 625-seat theatre, houses drama productions, assemblies, school Masses, and meetings.

== Notable alumni ==
- Judge Catherine Carlson of the Provincial Court of Manitoba
- Eira Friesen, community activist
- Kayla Friesen, hockey player
- Isabella Mary Gainsford, granddaughter of John A. Macdonald
- Amanda Lang, journalist
- Judge Kimberly Prost of the International Criminal Court
- Erin Teschuk, 2016 Olympian in the 3000 metres steeplechase
