= Rockwood, Winnipeg =

Neighbourhood in Winnipeg, Canada

Rockwood
- Neighbourhood
- Interactive map of Rockwood
- Coordinates: 49.8616°N 97.1671°W

Area
  - Neighbourhood: 1.0 km^{2} (0.39 sq mi)
  - Metro: 5,306.79 km^{2} (2,048.96 sq mi)

Population (2016)
  - Neighbourhood: 4,245
  - Density: 4,200/km^{2} (11,000/sq mi)
  - Metro: 778,489
- Time zone: UTC-6 (CST)
  - Summer (DST): UTC-5 (CDT)
- Forward sortation area: R3M
- Area codes: Area codes 204 and 431

Rockwood is a neighbourhood in the River Heights area of south-central Winnipeg, Manitoba.

Its borders are Corydon Avenue on the north, Stafford Street on the east, Grant Avenue to the south, and Cambridge Street to the west. Adjacent neighbourhoods are Crescentwood to the north, Grant Park to the south, Central River Heights to the West, and Earl Grey (Fort Rouge) to the east.

Except the homes between Harrow and Stafford Street, the neighbourhood features primarily post WWII single-storey bungalow homes.

== Amenities and points of interest ==
Notable businesses in the neighbourhood include the Centre for Natural Medicine, TD Canada Trust, and Royal Bank.

Schools include:

- Rockwood Elementary School (public; Winnipeg School Division) — A six-classroom expansion was completed in 1950. The new addition features lower windows to let more light in, compared to older school designs.
- St. Ignatius Catholic School (private) — built in 1908

Places of worship include:

- St. Ignatius Church (sometimes referred to as St. Iggy's) — The church was first located at the corner of Macmillan and Nassau. A new, larger parish, complete with two bell towers was announced in April 1911, estimated to cost $200,000. However the bell-tower was later found to be too costly at the time and was deleted from the plan two months later. A smaller church costing $40,000 was built instead. It was designed by architect H. J. Hill.
- Harrow United Church — opened and dedicated on December 4, 1949.

Recreational facilities include:

- Crescentwood Community Club — A skating rink was constructed for use, beginning in the 1944–45 season. Because residents had voiced an interest for a hockey rink for their sons, one was constructed in the 1945–46 season. At the beginning of summer 1945 a playground at the Community Club site was opened June 23. Asphalted tennis courts were constructed at a later date. Burton Cummings' first band, The Deverons, used to perform at the Crescentwood Community Centre.
- Harrow Playground — An amount set aside, $14,350 in October 1958 for the next year, which may have been the cost of the wading pool and adjacent building and constructed in June 1959.

Other points of interest include:

- Manitoba Hydro Substation Maintenance Building
- Rockwood Halls — a banquet hall
