= Winnipeg Route 85 =

City route in Winnipeg, Canada

Route 85
- Portage Avenue
- Route 85 highlighted in red
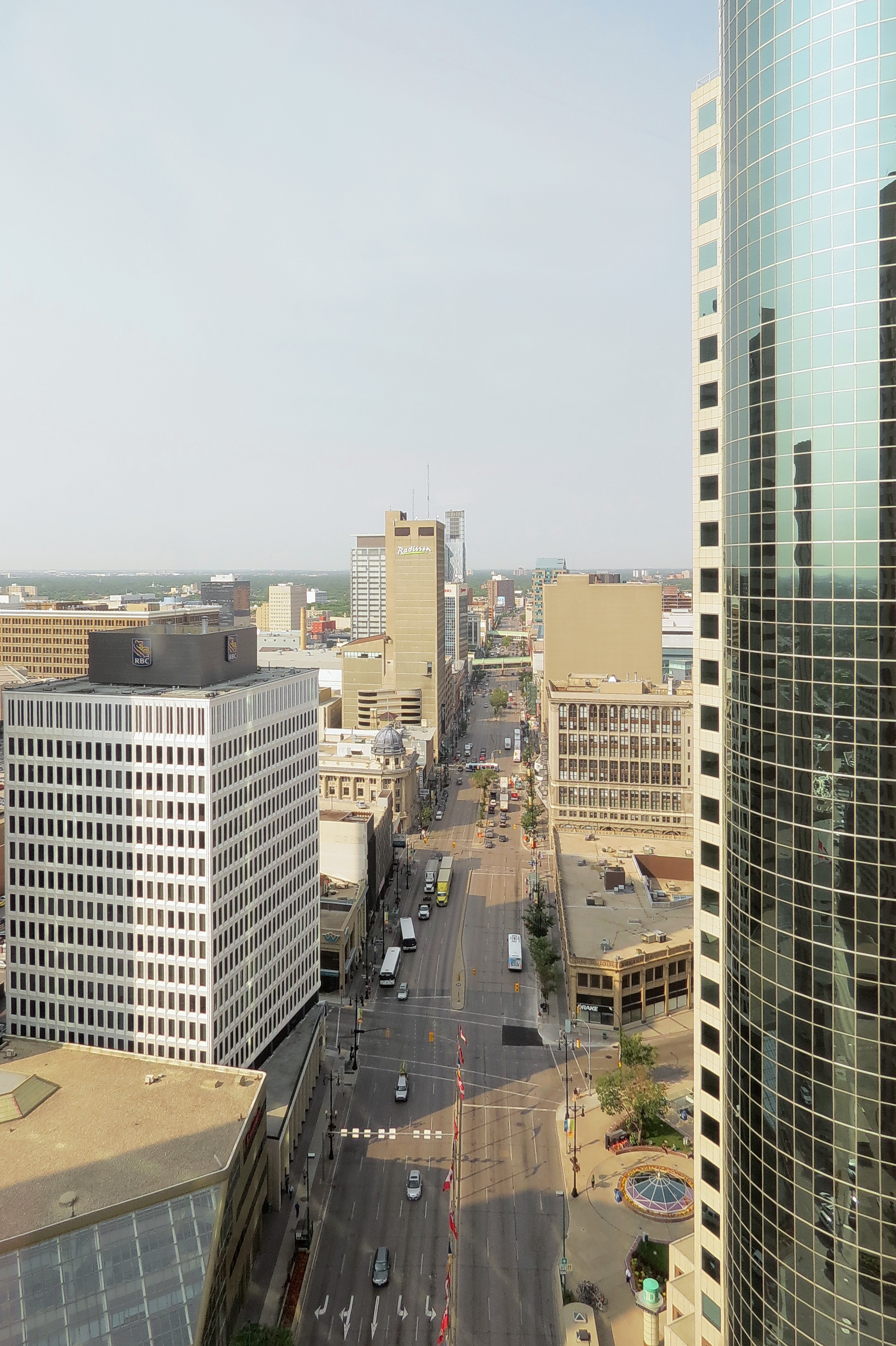
- Westward on Portage Avenue

Route information
- Maintained by City of Winnipeg
- Length: 14.0 km (8.7 mi)
- Existed: 1966–present
- Known for: Intersection at Portage and Main
- Component highways: Yellowhead Highway; PTH 1 (Trans-Canada Highway)

Major junctions
- East end: Route 52 (Main St) / Route 57
- Route 96 south (Moray St); Route 90 (Century St); Route 70 north (Maryland St); Route 70 south (Sherbrook St); PTH 1 east (Broadway); Route 62 (Colony St / Memorial Blvd); Route 42 south (Donald St); Route 42 north (Smith St); Route 57 west (Notre Dame St)
- West end: PTH 100 (TCH) south / PTH 101 north (Perimeter Hwy) / PTH 1 (TCH) west

Location
- Country: Canada
- Province: Manitoba

Highway system
- Provincial highways in Manitoba; Winnipeg City Routes
← Route 80	→ Route 90

Route 85, also known as Portage Avenue, is a major arterial route in the city of Winnipeg, Manitoba, Canada. It is one of the city's oldest and most important roads and is part of both the Trans-Canada and Yellowhead Highways.

== Route description ==
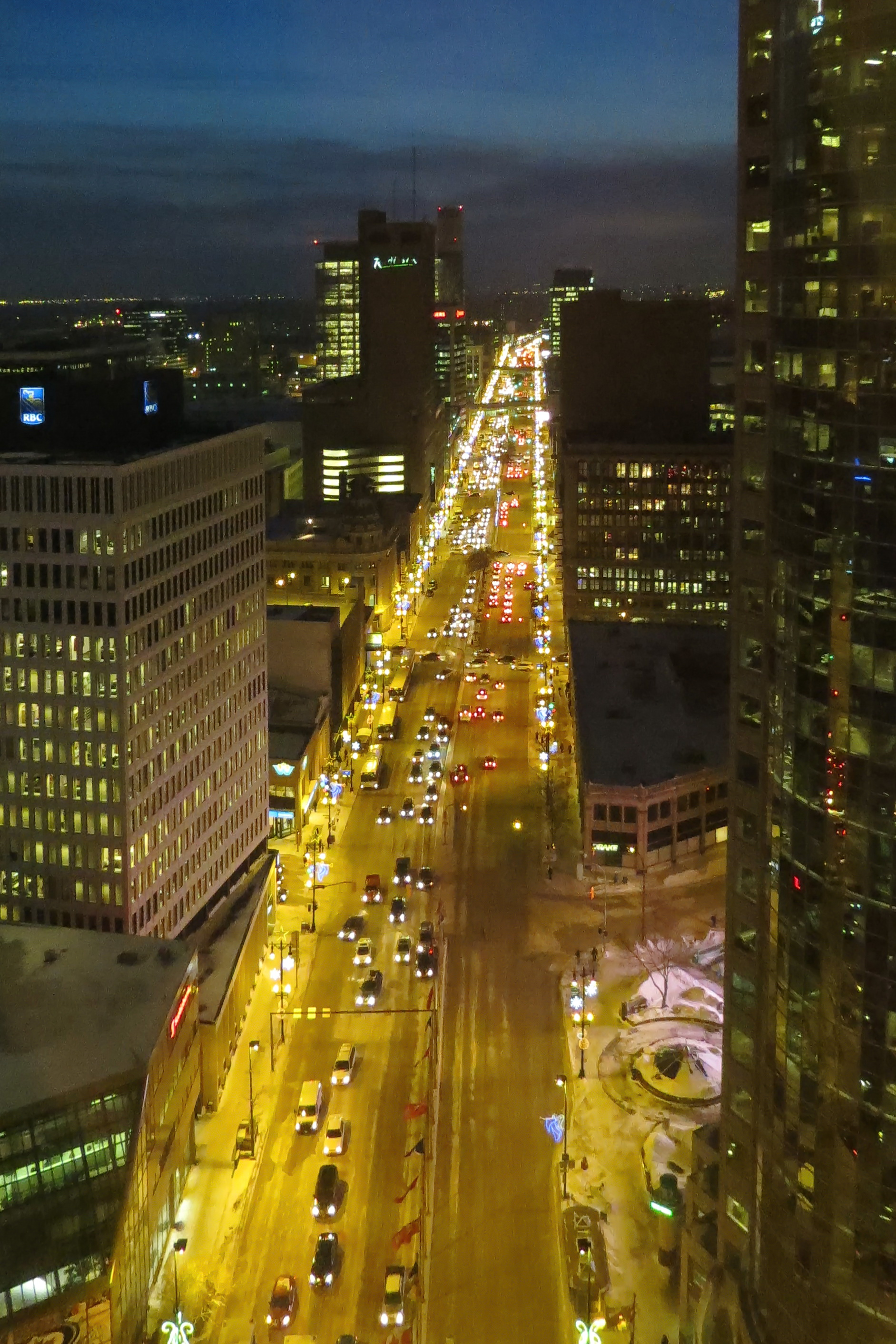
Looking west down Portage Avenue at night.

Route 85 begins in the heart of downtown Winnipeg, at the corner of Portage and Main (Route 52), and runs southwest through the downtown to Broadway. From Broadway to the west Perimeter Highway (PTH 100/101), it runs concurrently with the Trans-Canada Highway (PTH 1). Route 85 ends at the Perimeter Highway interchange; however, Portage Avenue and PTH 1 continue to the official city limit and into Headingley. Portage Avenue is also the first leg of the Yellowhead Highway from Winnipeg to Edmonton, which branches off PTH 1 on to PTH 16 near Portage la Prairie.

A six-lane road in the downtown, it expands to eight-lanes west of the downtown. Route 85 passes by major destinations such as Winnipeg Square, Canada Life Centre, Portage Place, Polo Park Shopping Centre, and the University of Winnipeg. It is also the main link (via Route 90) between the city's downtown and airport.

Portage Avenue East, which extends approximately 200 meters southeast from the Portage and Main intersection to Westbrook Street near Shaw Park, is not part of Route 85 or the Yellowhead Highway.

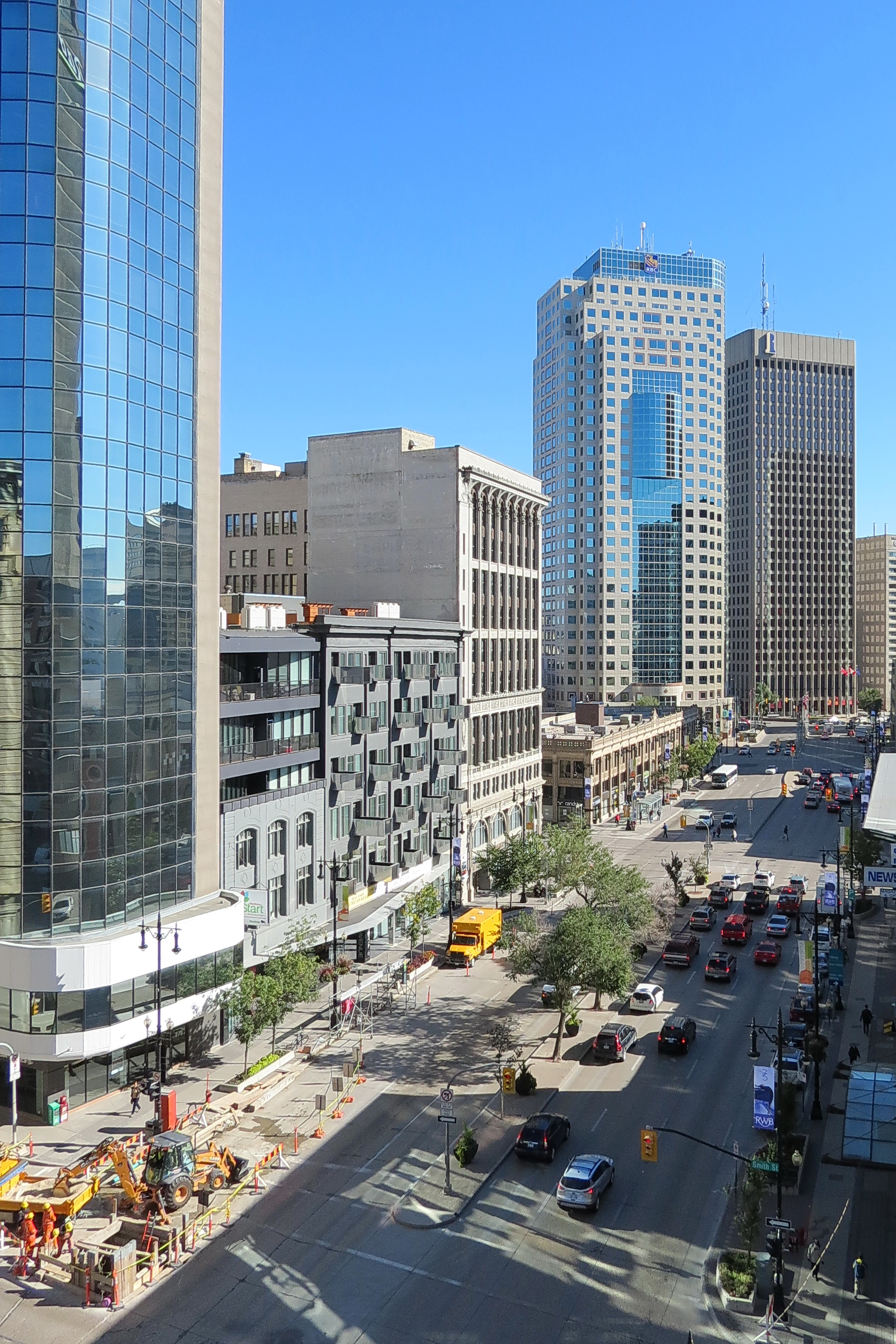
Eastward on Portage Avenue toward Portage and Main

== History ==
The origin of the route stems from its use as a part of an old Red River ox cart trail.

The (red river) carts left deep ruts in the soft prairie turf, so deep that the wagons tended to spread out, the right wheel of one cart travelling in the wake of the left wheel of the cart ahead; thus, the prairie trails could be as much as twenty carts wide, a phenomenon that helps explain the many broad streets in Winnipeg. Portage Avenue is the widest thoroughfare in Canada and was known as Queen Street during the period from 1891 to 1893 as part of a failed scheme to introduce a numbering scheme to Winnipeg's streets. It is actually part of the old trail that led west to Portage la Prairie and then on to Edmonton.

— Pierre Berton, The National Dream

== Major intersections ==
Major intersections for Route 85 starting from Westbrook Street and heading west to the Perimeter Highway. The entire route is in Winnipeg.

km	mi	Destinations	Notes
−0.2	−0.12	Westbrook Street (Route 57 east)	East end of Portage Avenue
0.0	0.0	Main Street (Route 52) / YH begins	See Portage and Main; Route 85 / Yellowhead Highway eastern terminus; east end of Route 57 concurrency
0.1	0.062	Notre Dame Avenue (Route 57 west) / Fort Street	West end of Route 57 westbound concurrency; one-way northbound (westbound)
0.2	0.12	Garry Street	One-way southbound
0.3	0.19	Smith Street (Route 42 north)	One-way northbound
0.4	0.25	Donald Street (Route 42 south)	One-way southbound
0.5	0.31	Hargrave Street	One-way northbound
0.6	0.37	Carlton Street (Route 57 south)	West end of Route 57 eastbound concurrency; one-way southbound (eastbound)
0.7	0.43	Edmonton Street	One-way, northbound (no access, T-intersection)
0.8	0.50	Kennedy Street	One-way southbound
0.9	0.56	Vaughan Street	One-way northbound
1.0	0.62	Colony Street / Memorial Boulevard (Route 62)	
1.2	0.75	Balmoral Street	Passes the University of Winnipeg
1.75	1.09	Sherbrook Street (Route 70 south)	One-way southbound
1.8	1.1	Maryland Street (Route 70 north)	One-way northbound
2.0	1.2	Broadway (PTH 1 (TCH) east)	East end of PTH 1 concurrency; no left turn (westbound)
2.3	1.4	Arlington Street	
3.0	1.9	Dominion Street	
3.5	2.2	Wall Street	One-way northbound
3.7	2.3	Erin Street	One-way southbound
4.0	2.5	Valour Road	
4.5	2.8	Empress Street	Grade separated; passes Polo Park
4.9	3.0	St. James Street	No left turn (both directions)
5.0	3.1	Route 90 (Century Street) – Airport	Interchange
9.3	5.8	Moray Street (Route 96 south)	
10.7	6.6	Sturgeon Road	Access to Grace Hospital
11.6	7.2	Westwood Drive	
13.3	8.3	Buchanan Boulevard	
13.7– 14.2	8.5– 8.8	Perimeter Highway (PTH 100 east / PTH 101 north) – Kenora PTH 1 (TCH) west (Portage Avenue) / YH – Portage la Prairie, Brandon	Interchange; signed as exits 318A (east) and 318B (north); Route 85 western terminus; PTH 1 continues west
1.000 mi = 1.609 km; 1.000 km = 0.621 mi: Closed/former; Concurrency terminus; Incomplete access

== See also ==
- Portage and Main
