= St. James Street (Winnipeg) =

Street in Winnipeg, Manitoba, Canada

Coordinates: 49.8998°N 97.2001°W

- Interactive map of St. James Street
- Maintained by: City of Winnipeg
- Length: 4.5 km (2.8 mi)
- Location: Winnipeg, Manitoba, Canada
- South end: Wolseley Ave W
- Major junctions: Route 85 (Portage Ave); Ness Ave; St. Matthews Ave; Ellice Ave; Sargent Ave; Wellington Ave; Route 57 (Dublin Ave)
- North end: Notre Dame Ave

St. James Street is a major street in the city of Winnipeg, Manitoba, Canada. It is a heavily-traveled street linking Portage Avenue, Polo Park, and the St. James Industrial area.

== Route description ==
St. James Street begins near the Assiniboine River in a small residential area south of Portage Avenue (Route 85) and runs north, parallel to Route 90. North of Portage Avenue, it enters the Polo Park and Old St. James districts, one of the city's busiest retail and commercial areas. Further north, it enters the St. James Industrial Park, which encompasses the area immediately east of the Winnipeg airport. St. James Street ends at Notre Dame Avenue.

== History ==
St. James Street is named after the parish of Saint James. After the parish gained title to the land through the Manitoba Act of 1871, it was able to sell parcels of the original land grant to raise funds, selling 300 acres in 1881. The extension of Winnipeg city limits in 1882 made St. James Street the city's new western boundary. Since 1972, St. James Street has served as the boundary between the major districts of St. James-Assiniboia and the West End. The city's former two largest sports venues, Winnipeg Arena and Winnipeg Stadium, were both located on St. James Street.

Since the 1970s and 1980s St. James Street has developed into a secondary retail shopping area of the Polo Park area. It features big box retailers such as Canadian Tire, Costco, Best Buy, Best Sleep Centre, Visions Electronics, Staples, Mark's, Old Navy, Michaels, Fabricland, and The Brick.

St. James Street has been regarded as one of the most poorly maintained streets in the city by local residents and was voted as the "Worst Road in Manitoba" twice (2012, 2014) in annual polls conducted by the Manitoba chapter of the Canadian Automobile Association. As a result, local government prioritized the complete reconstruction of the street's most deteriorated segments.
