= Portage Place =

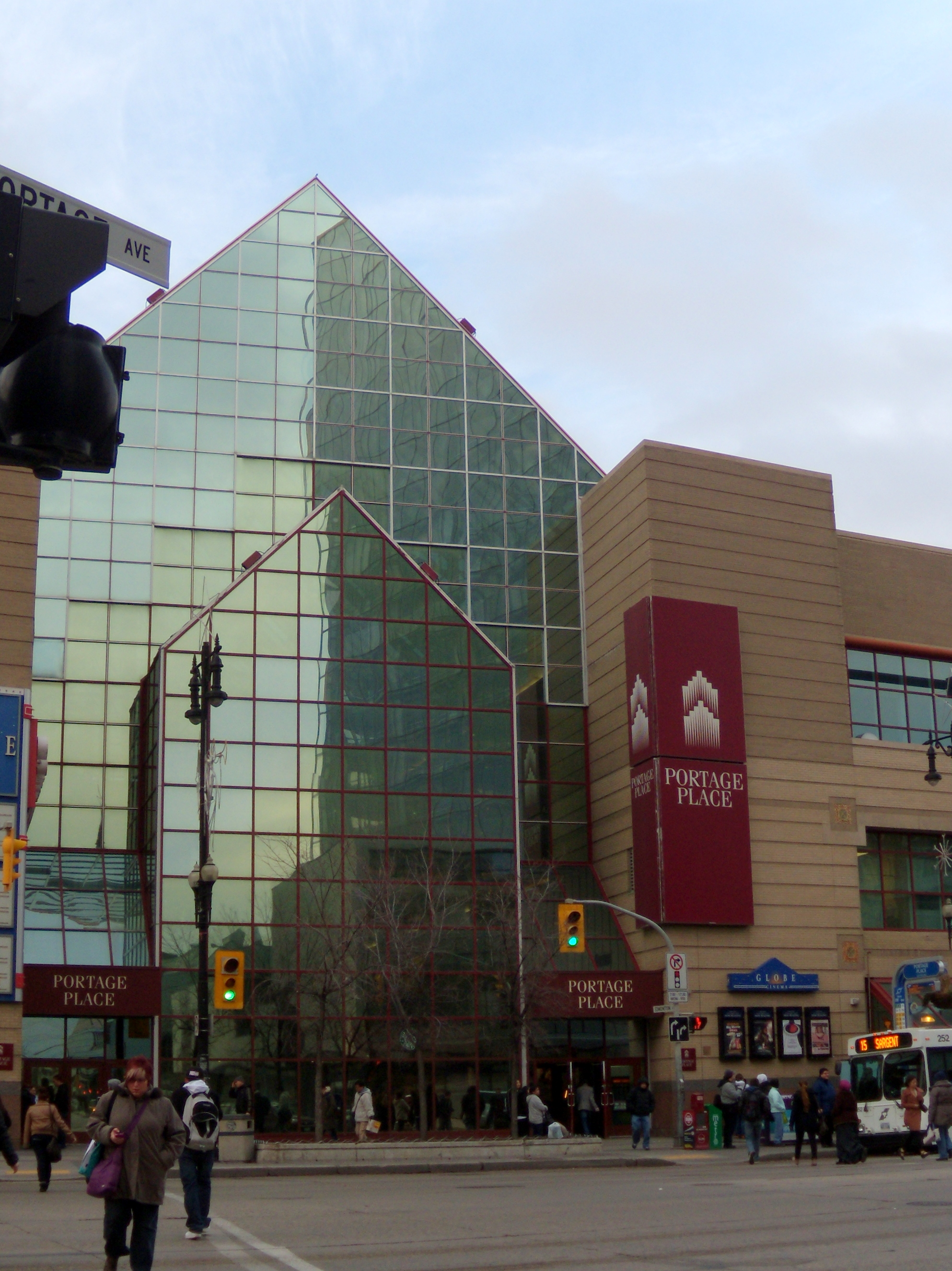
- Portage Place mall on the intersection of Portage Avenue and Kennedy Street
- Location: 393 Portage Ave, Winnipeg, MB R3B 3H6
- Coordinates: 49.8925°N 97.1478°W
- Opened: September 17, 1987
- Developer: North Portage Development Corp.
- Owner: True North Real Estate Development Corp.
- Architect: RTKL Architects; Number Ten Architectural Group; Smith Carter Architects; IKOY Partnership
- Num. of stores: 48
- Num. of anchor tenants: 3 (1 Open, 2 Vacant)
- Floors: 4
- Website: portageplace.ca/

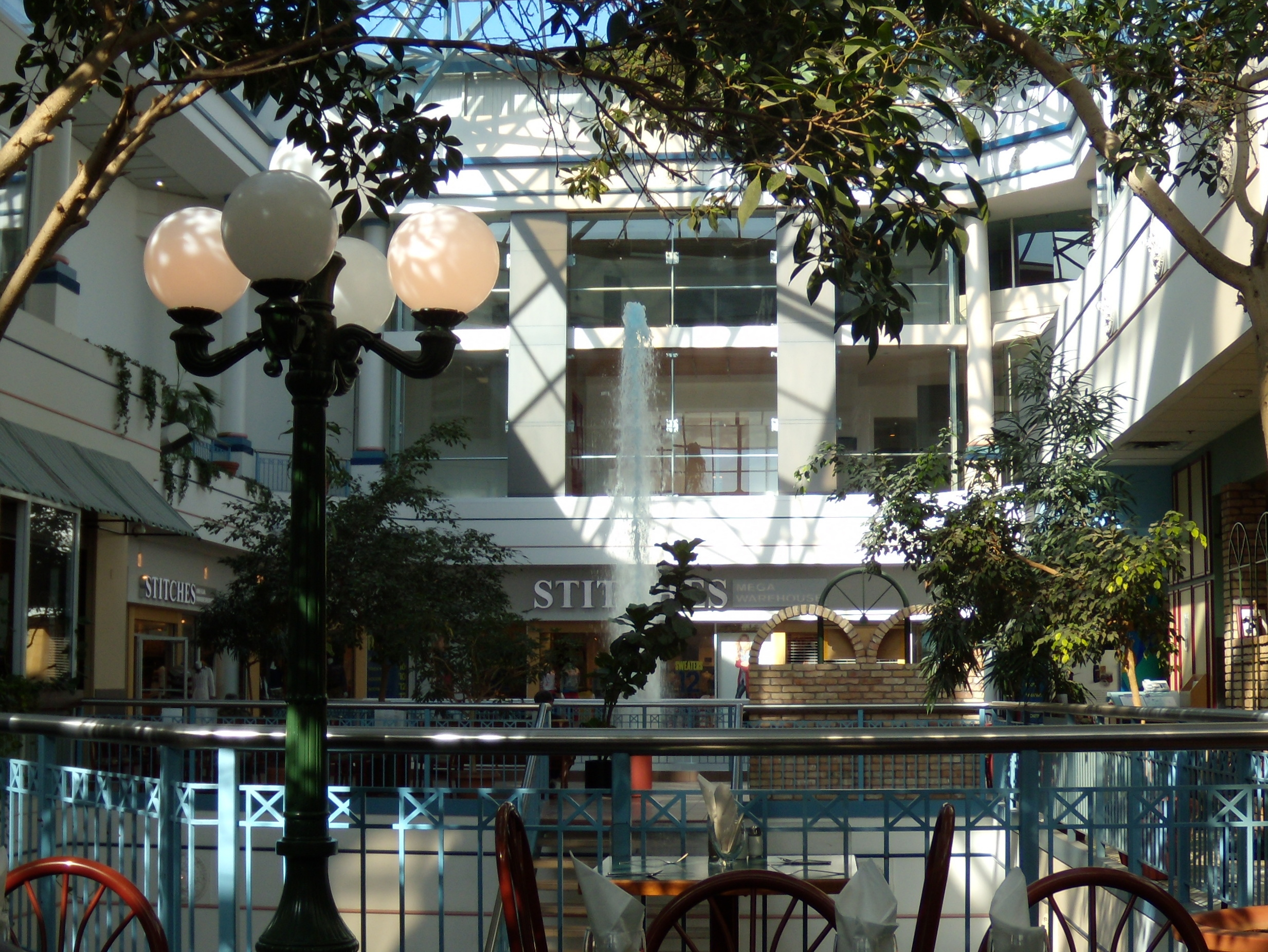
Fountain in Portage Place shopping mall, as seen from Cherry Creek restaurant on second floor

Portage Place is a mixed-use shopping centre located in downtown Winnipeg, Manitoba, Canada. Covering 439,600 sq ft (40,840 m^{2}), it is located on the north side of Portage Avenue, between Vaughan and Carlton Streets and opened in September 1987.

== History ==
In the early 1980s, north Portage Avenue was in decline, due in part to the "flight to the suburbs" and free parking at suburban malls. The federal, provincial, and municipal governments joined to create the Core Area Initiative in 1981 to counter this decline, and rebuild this part of downtown. One of the proposals in 1983 to "fix" the north side of Portage Avenue was to realign the roadway and build a new arena; however, this proposal was rejected by City Council.

In 1983, the North Portage Development Corporation (now the Forks North Portage Partnership) was established as an arms-length government committee to develop residential, commercial, entertainment, and educational facilities in the North Portage region. The following year, the corporation announced the building of the mall, which included the apartments behind it, known as "The Promenade". Signers included Member of Parliament Lloyd Axworthy, and Mayor Bill Norrie. The construction required the demolition of 32 buildings. Among those was a section of buildings on the north side of Portage Avenue that had fallen into disrepair. By the summer of 1985, these buildings within the land area of Portage Place were demolished. Some design elements from those buildings were incorporated into the mall's façade. Construction took place throughout 1986, being completed the following year, in 1987.

The cost total cost of the project was $80 million (equivalent to $157 million in 2019). The mall opened on September 17, 1987. An estimated 200,000 people visited the mall on opening day. The mall opened with 130 retail units.

In June 1988, barely a year after the mall opened, there were doubts about the shopping centre's success. Some store owners in the shopping centre stated that after 5:30 p.m. there was a large drop in customers, and some tenants wanted their rent reduced. Most tenants were required to stay open until 9:30 pm on certain days. Holt Renfrew, one of the mall's anchor tenants, began closing at 6:00 pm.

In 1997, the City of Winnipeg added more street parking and enlarged the sidewalks in front of the mall. Still, critics argued that Portage Place had actually hindered the downtown revival by removing pedestrians from the streets, particularly on the south side of Portage Avenue. In the same year, Consolidated Properties, which later became Aspen Properties, purchased the mall for 43 million dollars from Cadillac Fairview, the original owner.

In 2005, Portage Place was sold by Aspen Properties to Peterson Investment Group.

Holt Renfrew closed in August 2007 and was replaced with Urban Planet. McNally Robinson also announced they would vacate the mall. At the time, the mall had 107 of 110 retail units occupied.

An October 2007 Dominion Bond Rating Service (DBRS) report on Portage Place observed that "the property’s cash flow has continued to be depressed" amid declining average contractual rental rates, and that "the cash flow of the property may therefore not be enough to cover its refinance debt service." DBRS also noted, however, that the owners have "displayed [a] commitment to the property and DBRS doubts that it will be willing to lose control of its investment in lieu of injecting cash equity to reduce the refinance obligation."

In 2010, Portage Place converted 13 units of retail space totalling 15,000 square feet (1,400 m^{2}) to office space. The change was planned as a result of a 15% vacancy rate. The units chosen for conversion were those in the west wing of the second floor.

The IMAX Theatre in Portage Place closed on March 31, 2013. The 276-seat theatre endured several years of substantial losses before its closure. Globe Cinema closed on June 15, 2014.

=== Redevelopment ===
In July 2019, Starlight Investments announced its intent to acquire Portage Place, paying $22.9 million for the shopping centre and $47 million for the land and underground parkade. Starlight announced an extensive refurbishment of the mall, with new residential, business, and retail units, reconfiguring the existing outdated design. Construction was scheduled to begin in 2021. However, on September 29, 2021, Starlight Developments informed The Forks North Portage Partnership and Winnipeg City Council that they will not proceed with purchasing Portage Place, and asked for their deposit back, hindering any re-development plans.

In March 2023, True North Real Estate Development—a division of True North Sports & Entertainment—received approval from the city executive policy committee, and the provincial and federal governments, for a proposal to acquire Portage Place's land and air rights from Forks North Portage Partnership for at least $34.5 million, pending approval from city council.

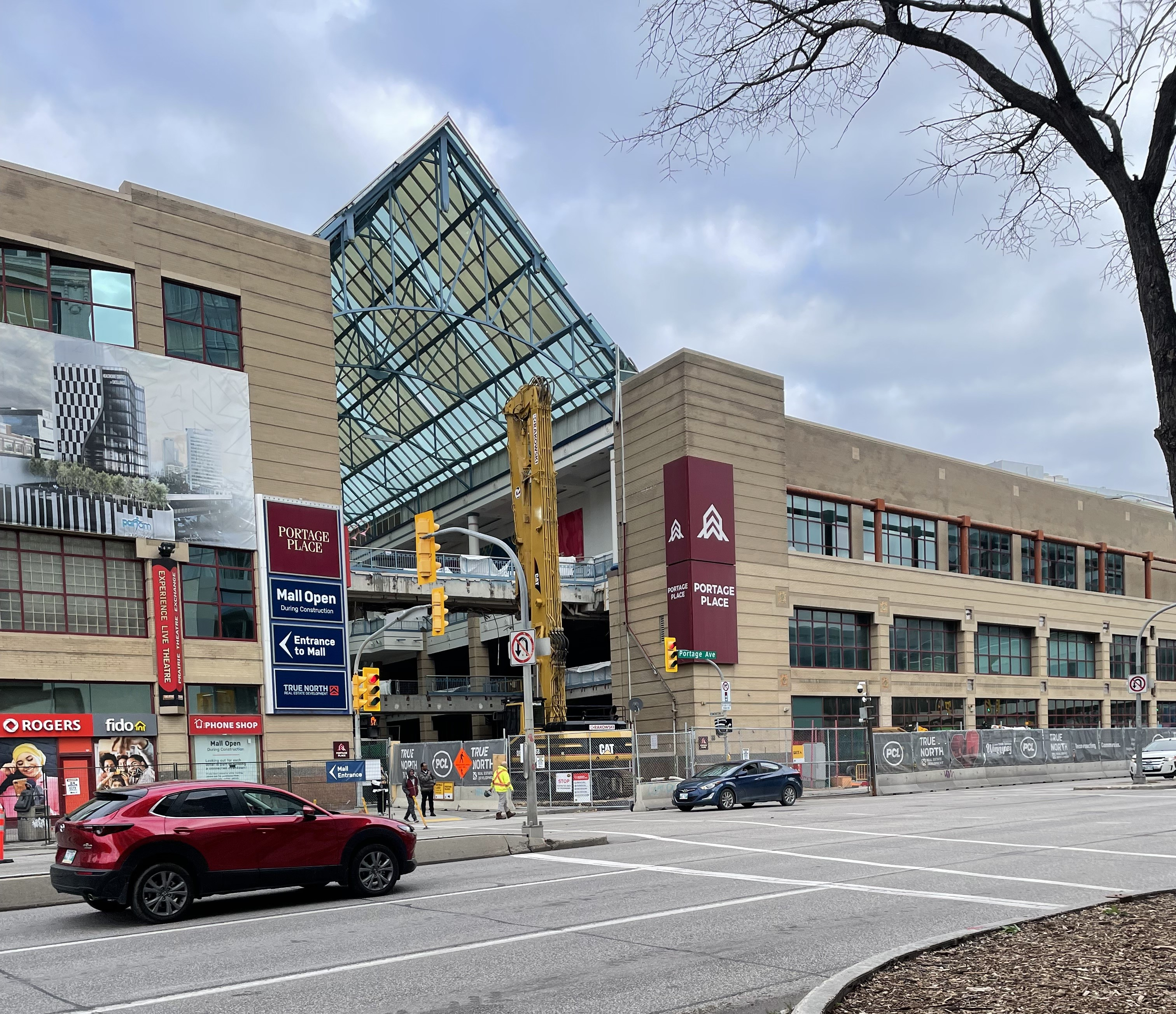
Demolition of the Edmonton Atrium in 2025

In May 2023, True North announced aspects of a $500 million redevelopment plan for Portage Place, turning it into a campus including a grocery store, and community, cultural, and recreational functions. Shared Health committed to long-term leases of a 15-storey tower at its east end, which would include the Downtown Winnipeg Health Centre for Excellence and the Pan Am Centre for Advanced Musculoskeletal Medicine. A 16-storey tower at the west end would have affordable housing units. True North chairman Mark Chipman stated that their proposal would "transform it into a place that connects neighbourhoods, provides access to badly needed services, and has social and economic impact by building a sense of community mindedness."

In March 2025, construction began on the redevelopment and on July 11, the east skywalk was closed to allow for construction to continue. The food court and the entirety of the Edmonton atrium was closed by the end of July. The skywalk is expected to be closed until at least 2028.

== Layout ==
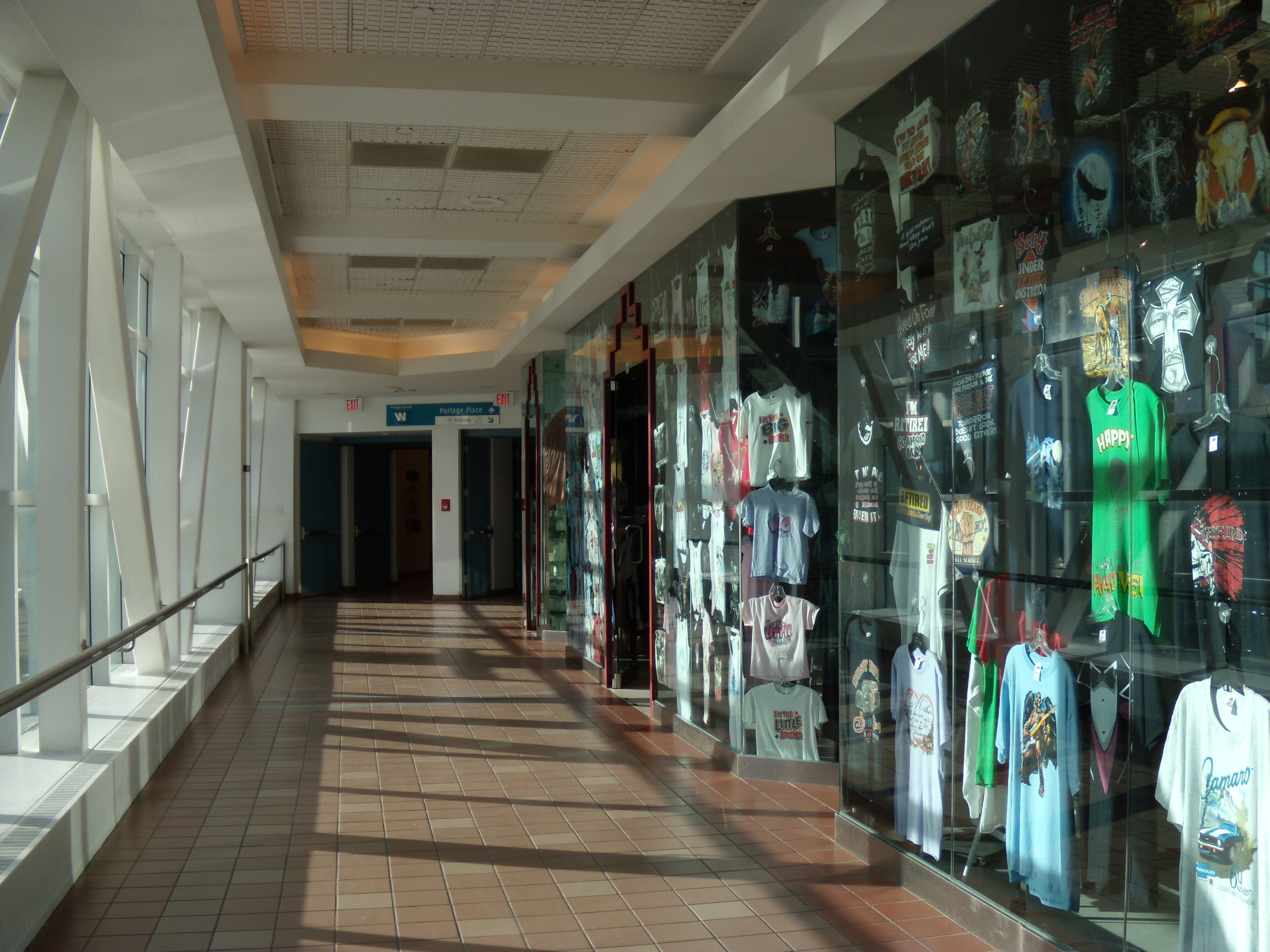
Shops in Winnipeg Walkway connecting Portage Place to the Hydro building

Portage Place spans three floors, totalling 439,600 square feet (40,840 m^{2}). The only remaining anchor store is currently Shoppers Drug Mart as Staples closed in 2020. Portage Place is also known for being a central hub of the Winnipeg Walkway, connecting to Cityplace, Canada Life Centre, and to the now closed Hudson's Bay department store which is currently undergoing a redevelopment project. There are shops located on the skywalks, as well.

In 2013, Service Canada moved their downtown Winnipeg office onto the first floor of Portage Place.

The shopping centre includes three glass skylight atria, two of which are located at the intersections of both Portage and Kennedy, and Portage and Edmonton.

The mall had a fountain which would shoot a 16 metre high stream of water approximately every 3 minutes. This required the use of a fire hose nozzle, which is welded into the base of the fountain. The fountain was removed in 2025.

=== Edmonton court clock ===
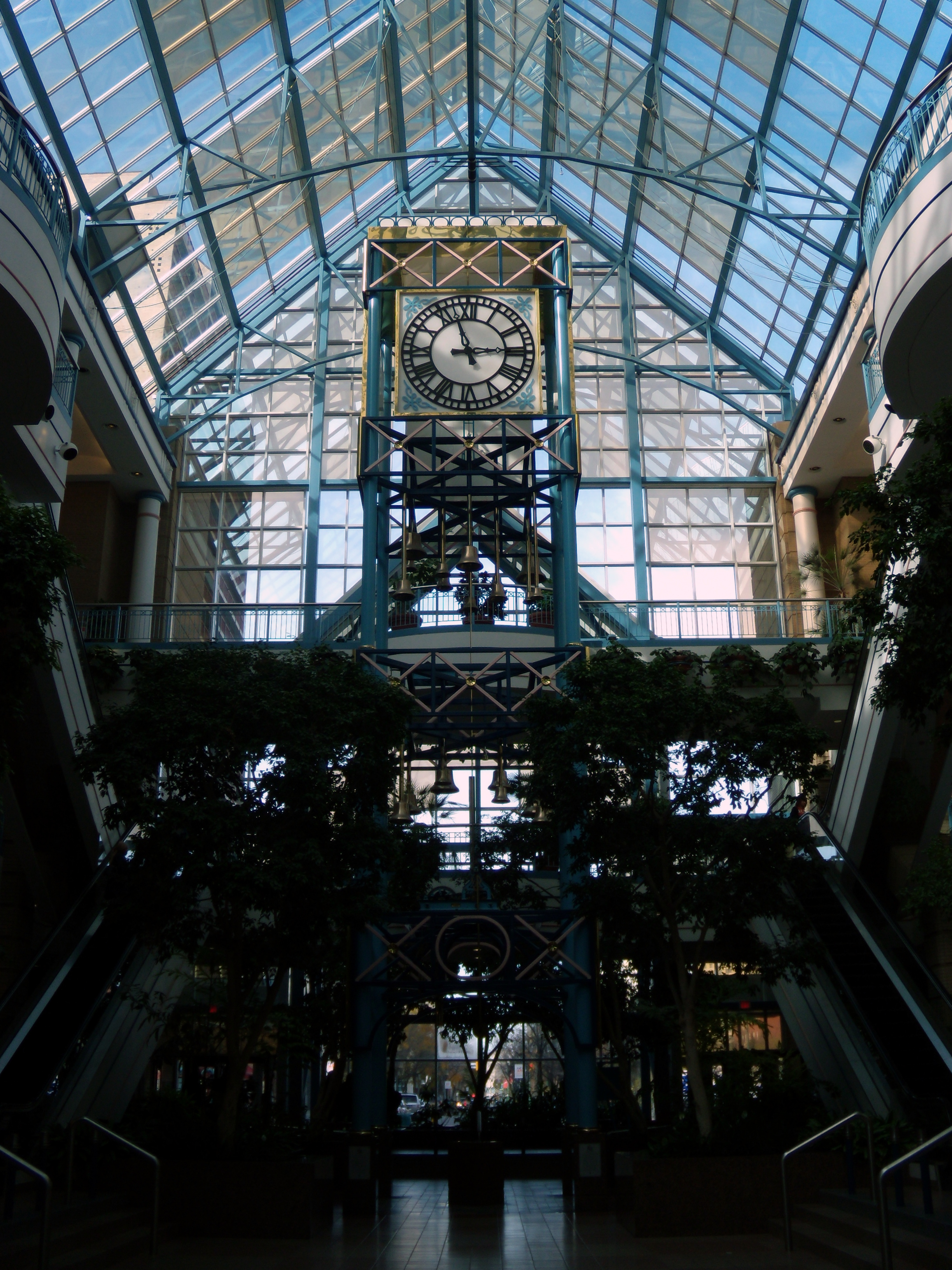
Edmonton Court clock tower

The Edmonton atrium contains a clock tower known as the Edmonton Court Clock. The clock was first unveiled in 1903 for installation in the dome of Winnipeg's original city hall. After the city hall was demolished in 1961, components of the clock were retained. The clock was unveiled a second time in 1987 when it was reinstalled in Portage Place following redevelopment of the site.

The original city hall clock featured four clock faces, each measuring 2.1 metres (7 feet) in diameter and made of crushed glass. The weights used to balance the pendulum weighed 450 kilograms (1,000 pounds) each.

The clock mechanism was manufactured by the Seth Thomas Clock Company. The contract to procure and install the clock was awarded to local jeweller George Andrew of Andrew and Co.

During redevelopment in the 1980s, remaining clock components were moved to Portage Place. The current clock uses replica faces and hands, and its bells are not original to the 1903 installation. The chimes are now electronic rather than mechanical. After installation at Portage Place, the clock was inoperable for several years due to contractor damage and later vandalism.
