= Winnipeg Public Library =

Public library system in Manitoba

- Location: Winnipeg, Manitoba, Canada
- Type: Public Library
- Established: 1905; 121 years ago
- Branches: 20

Collection
- Size: 1,433,135 (2015)

Access and use
- Circulation: 4.88 million (2018)
- Population served: 749,607 (2021)
- Members: 379,830 (2018)

Other information
- Budget: $32,230,085 (2018)
- Director: Karin Borland
- Employees: 283 (2012)
- Website: https://winnipeg.ca/library

The Winnipeg Public Library (French: Bibliothèque publique de Winnipeg) is a public library system in Winnipeg, Manitoba. Branches provide programming for children, teens, and adults. The Library also contains an Outreach Department which works with the community, as well as people who cannot visit the library directly. Outreach also promotes the library to communities that are under represented in the library.

Visitors to the Winnipeg Public Library checked out over 4.8 million items in 2018, including e-Books. The library has both adult and children's books in over 30 languages. Select locations provide tutorial rooms for learners to use free of charge.

The library has DVD and Blu-ray collections, as well as Wi-Fi, at all twenty locations. The library provides access to over 17,000 eBooks and over 450,000 songs. There are over 300 computers available to be booked.

The library offers a Writer-in-Residence program to assist budding authors and has done so since 1985.

The staff at the library are members of the Canadian Union of Public Employees Local 500.

== History ==
=== Original City of Winnipeg Public Library System ===
The Winnipeg Public Library began as a public service to city residents in 1905.

==== Carnegie Branch ====
Winnipeg's first public library was the Carnegie Library (380 William Ave.), opened in 1905. American philanthropist Andrew Carnegie had funded the construction of three public libraries in the city. All the city had to do was to choose suitable locations. The main branch would be located downtown. The Free Press asked their readers in May 1902 where they'd prefer to locate the Carnegie branch. The top responses were: Ellice Ave. at Smith St., former Trinity Hall (Portage and Garry), Central Park, Victoria Park, and Market site of City Hall Square. After the site on William Avenue had been chosen, the architect chosen to design the building was Henry Sandham Griffith but after his plans exceeded the permitted budget the project was given to Samuel Hooper. The Carnegie branch had been under construction in 1904 when it was described in a Free Press article as "most pretentious of our civic buildings…There are not many buildings with an all-[lime]stone exterior. Hitherto, such buildings have been considered too expensive for the city." The Library was officially opened on October 12, 1905, by Lady Evelyn, Earl Grey, daughter of the Governor General of Canada.

The branch was closed after the Centennial Library opened in the spring of1977. It subsequently re-opened as a library for new immigrants wanting to learn English. Later on, it was used to store and provide access to the city's archival records.

In 2013 while the roof was being repaired, a hole had let water seep inside the building from a heavy rainstorm, damaging a portion of the archive. As at May 2018, the city had not yet decided what to do with the now damaged building — repair it and move the archives back into the building or sell it to a developer. The worst-case scenario would have the building demolished for something newer.

==== River Heights Branch ====
Two potential sites had been considered for a new River Heights branch, budgeted at $70,000, in May 1958, serving the new and growing subdivision of Winnipeg. The city's Library Committee had preferred the Corydon at Ash St. location next to a football field or by purchasing a property worth $15,000 on Corydon at Niagara, while the Recreation Committee preferred it on Haskins (now Grosvenor) Avenue, next to River Heights School. A large delegation appeared before the city's Recreation Committee on June 18, 1958, opposing putting the River Heights Library at the corner of Corydon and Ash. They said it would decrease the amount of space for sports. The next day the Recreation Committee, due to public pressure from the Community Club, voted against the Corydon at Ash site. By April 1960 a firm decision on the site was made. It would be located next to Brock-Corydon elementary school and would now cost $75,000. The new River Heights branch opened to the public on September 1, 1961. The final cost of construction was $77,500. In that month, 1,500 new memberships were created and book circulation in the River Heights area grew to 17,600.

In July 1968 the City of Winnipeg purchased a new bookmobile for $10,000, because the library committee had stated that the current vehicle was so dilapidated that it might not last until the end of the year.

Earlier in the 2010s, it was determined that the 1961 era River Heights branch had reached "end of life". Various locations were sought, one of them at the corner of Nathaniel and Taylor which was not found suitable. Later on the final decision was made to locate the new River Heights branch at the corner of Nathaniel and Grant Avenue and to name it the Bill and Helen Norrie Library. A groundbreaking took place on October 29, 2019.

=== St. James Public Library ===
On February 7, 1958, the new $60,000 St. James Library opened its doors to the public, at the time the first new library building in Manitoba to be built since the mid-1910s. The Lions Club of St. James contributed a portion of the cost of the new construction. Prior to the new building, the St. James Public Library had been housed in one room of St. James Collegiate (next door) since 1955. The current size of the Library is 25,351 ft^{2} (2,355.2 m^{2}), making it one of the largest in the WPL system.

== Services ==
- Information and reference services
- Access to full text databases, such as the Globe and Mail newspaper (dating back to 1977), plus some other periodicals, is available via Ebscohost.
- Community information
- All branches provide Internet access via several PCs. Most computers have a 120-minute daily limit, while some others function as "Express" with limited functionality (no headphones) an have a daily 30-minute limit. Library patrons are able to reserve a terminal 24-hours ahead of time. Each computer is hooked up to a laser printer where patrons can print documents (web pages, PDFs, Microsoft Office). Printing a page costs 25¢, more if printing in colour.
- Reader's advisory services
- Programs for children, youth and adults
- Delivery to homebound individuals
- Interlibrary loan
- Free downloadable audiobooks and songs
- ideaMILL Makerspace, providing 3D printing technology, is available at the Millennium branch's third floor

== Branches ==
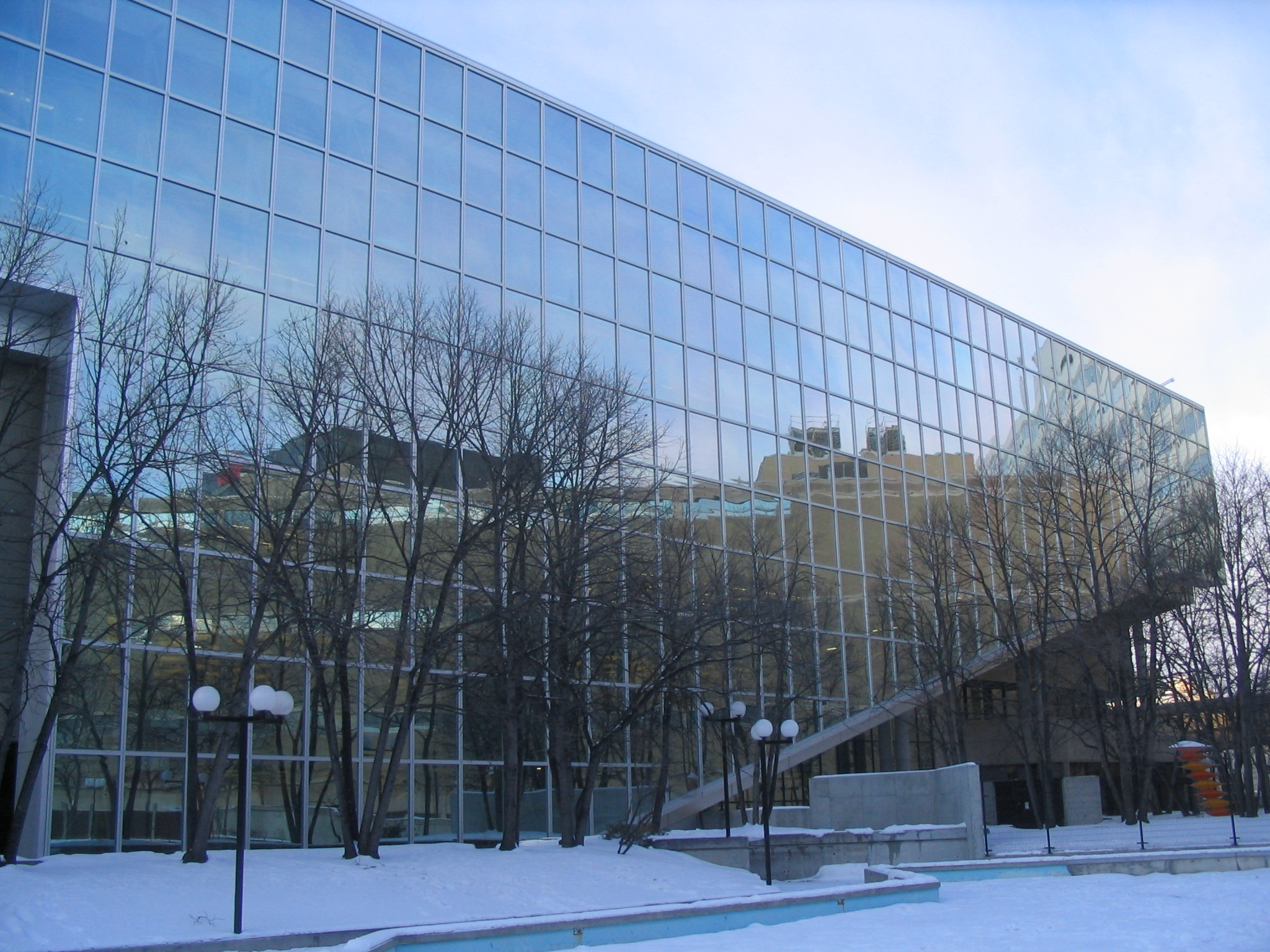
The Millennium Library, which is the main branch of the Winnipeg Public Library

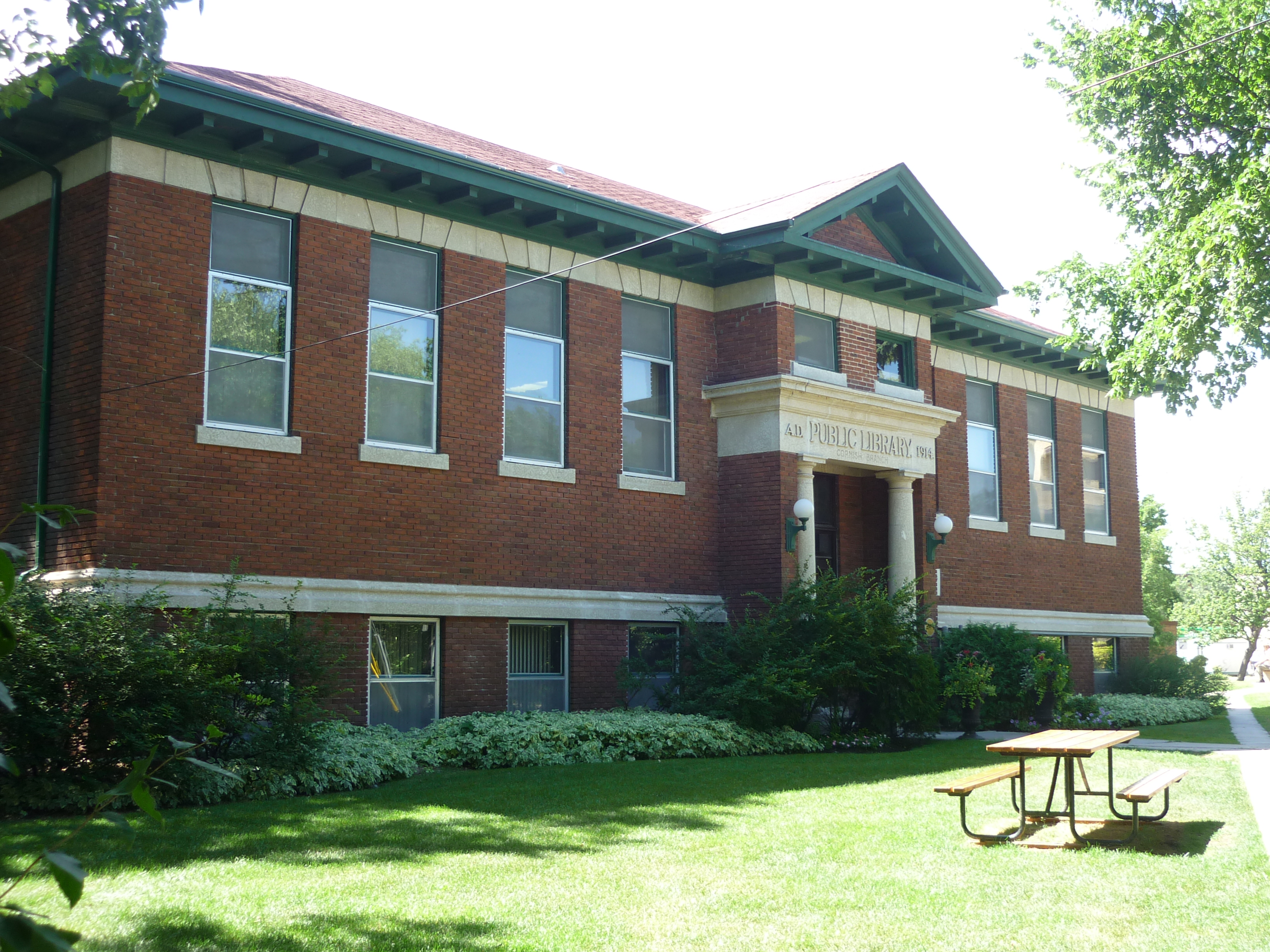
The Cornish Library, which was constructed in 1915

The library has branches in 20 locations in Winnipeg:

- Sir William Stephenson Library, 765 Keewatin Street
- West Kildonan Library, 365 Jefferson Avenue
- Henderson Library, 1-1050 Henderson Highway
- St. John's Library, 500 Salter Street
- Munroe Library, 489 London Street
- Harvey Smith Library, 999 Sargent Avenue (formerly at 823 Ellice Ave)
- Millennium Library, 251 Donald Street, the main branch which opened November 8, 2005, after extensive renovations
- Bill and Helen Norrie Library, 15 Poseidon Bay
- St. Boniface Library, 100-131 Provencher Boulevard
- Transcona Library, 1 Transcona Boulevard (formerly at 111 Victoria Avenue West)
- Westwood Library, 66 Allard Avenue
- St. James-Assiniboia Library, 1910 Portage Avenue
- Cornish Library, 20 West Gate
- Charleswood Library, 6-4910 Roblin Boulevard
- Osborne Library, 625 Osborne Street
- St. Vital Library, 6 Fermor Avenue
- Windsor Park Library, 1195 Archibald Street (formerly at 955 Cottonwood Road)
- Fort Garry Library, 1360 Pembina Highway
- Louis Riel Library, 1168 Dakota Street
- Pembina Trail Library, 2724 Pembina Highway

=== Former Branches ===
- William Avenue Library - 380 William Avenue. Was the Main Branch until Centennial Library opened in March 1977. It is one of three Carnegie libraries in Winnipeg, and functioned as the City of Winnipeg Archives until 2013 when flooding to the roof during repairs caused it to closed indefinitely.
- Coronation Park Library - 120 Eugenie St. Was one of three branches in the St. Boniface Library system (Provencher, Coronation Park, Windsor Park). It was replaced in the late 1980s by the St. Boniface Branch in the Centre Ville building at 131 Provencher Boulevard. Currently used as the Forum Art Institute.
- McPhillips Library - 1120 McPhillips Ave. - closed in 1997 when the Sir William Stephenson branch opened
- Brooklands Library - 1880 Alexander Ave. - closed in 1997 when the Sir William Stephenson branch opened.
- River Heights Library - 1520 Corydon Ave. - closed in 2021 when the Bill and Helen Norrie Library branch opened.

== See also ==
- List of Carnegie libraries in Canada
