= Crescentwood, Winnipeg =

Neighbourhood in Winnipeg, Canada

Crescentwood
- Neighbourhood
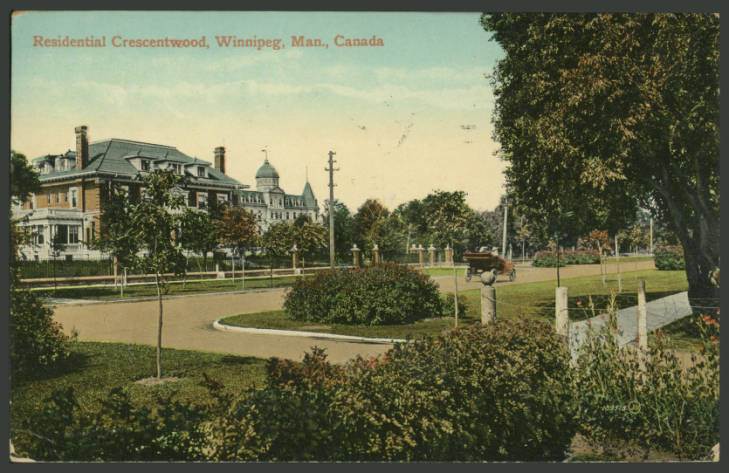
- Residential Crescentwood c. 1912
- Interactive map of Crescentwood
- Coordinates: 49°52′02″N 97°09′45″W
- Country: Canada
- Province: Manitoba
- City: Winnipeg
- Area: River Heights
- Original development: 1904
- Founder: C. H. Enderton

Area
  - Total: 1.1 km^{2} (0.42 sq mi)

Population (2021)
  - Total: 2,925

Crescentwood is a neighbourhood in the River Heights area of Winnipeg, Manitoba, Canada. It is bordered on the north by Academy Road, on the east by the Assiniboine River, on the south by Corydon Avenue, and on the west by Cambridge Street.

== History ==
Crescentwood was developed by noted Winnipeg real estate agent C. H. Enderton.

The original Enderton development included a major portion of Crescentwood and a small corner of River Heights. In 1904, Enderton laid out Yale, Harvard, Kingsway and Dromore Avenues. He also purchased lots to create Oxford Street and the east side of Waverley north to Wellington Crescent. All the property on the river side of Wellington Crescent from Grosvenor Avenue to just beyond Elm Street in River Heights was his as well.

Many of the wealthiest residents moved into the new neighbourhood from 1904 until the 1913 recession. The remaining lots sold as the economy recovered.

Today, Crescentwood remains a middle-class neighbourhood adjacent to River Heights. Enderton was born in Lafayette, Indiana, in 1864, and after his university training worked as a lawyer in St. Paul, Minnesota. He came to Winnipeg in 1890 and made a success of his career in real estate. His many memberships and board positions showed him to be a prominent citizen of his adopted city. He remained a bachelor, living in a suite at the Fort Garry Court. On the day of his death he had been driving with a lady friend around Assiniboine Park. He was struck by a heart attack while returning along Academy Road.

When C. H. Enderton died in 1920, he left an estate of $1,200,000. This was the largest estate probated in Manitoba since the death of Donald A. Smith, Lord Strathcona, in 1914. After remembering some charities in Winnipeg, such as the Children's Hospital, he left the residue of his estate to his alma mater, Depauw University, although it was admitted at the time that his assets consisted largely of real estate which were not readily marketable.

Wellington Crescent was once an Indian trail following the curves of the Assiniboine River. In 1893 it was named Wellington Street after lawyer Arthur Wellington Ross who came from Cornwall, Ontario and purchased land in Fort Rouge.

In 2020, Crescentwood was nominated as a heritage conservation district. A study and survey are being conducted to determine the scope of the heritage status.

== Demography ==
Population history
Year	Pop.	±%
1971	3,840	—
1976	3,670	−4.4%
1981	3,135	−14.6%
1986	2,805	−10.5%
1991	2,880	+2.7%
1996	2,795	−3.0%
2001	2,735	−2.1%
2006	2,705	−1.1%
2011	2,665	−1.5%
2016	2,715	+1.9%
2021	2,925	+7.7%

The population in Crescentwood was 2,925 residents in 2021.
