= Academy Road (Winnipeg) =

Street in Winnipeg, Canada

- Interactive map of Academy Road
- Former names: Godfrey Ave; Bridge St
- Part of: Route 70 (Maryland Bridge to Stafford St)
- Namesake: St. Mary's Academy
- Maintained by: Academy Road BIZ
- Length: 3.3 km (2.1 mi)
- Location: Winnipeg, Manitoba, Canada
- Coordinates: 49.8738°N 97.1857°W
- East end: Route 70 north (Maryland St / Sherbrook St) / Wellington Cr
- Major junctions: Route 70 south (Stafford St); Route 90 (Kenaston Blvd)
- West end: Wellington Cr

Academy Road is a street in Winnipeg, Manitoba, Canada. It runs from the Maryland Bridge to Wellington Crescent, just west of Route 90 (Kenaston Boulevard), and actually intersects with Wellington at both its east and west ends. Academy Road is located in the residential neighbourhood of River Heights and has many retail stores along it.

The speed limit along the street is 50 km/h.

== History ==
Academy Road was named after St. Mary's Academy, a private school for girls that lies on the portion of the road just south of the Maryland Bridge. The portion west of Cambridge Street was originally named Godfrey Avenue but was renamed Academy Road in the 1930s. It was originally served by "Broadway" street cars, but the route became known later on as "Academy Road" when this section became the more important portion of the route.

== Points of interest ==
Some points of interest along Academy Road include:

- St. Mary's Academy, the private school for which Academy Road is named after, lies on the portion of the road just south of the Maryland Bridge.
- Shaarey Zedek Synagogue

=== Uptown Theatre ===
Uptown Lofts
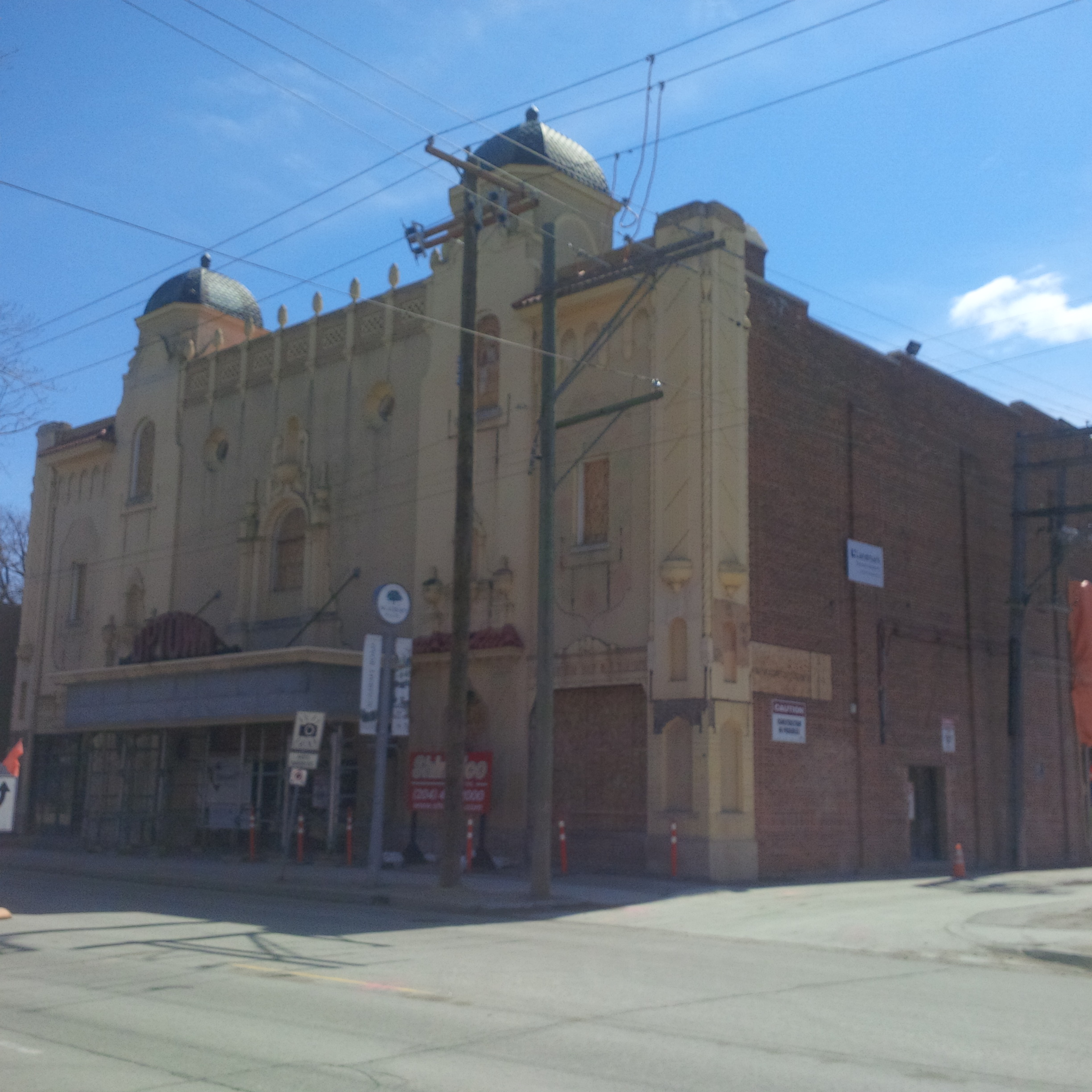
- Former names: Uptown Theatre Academy Uptown Lanes

General information
- Architectural style: Moorish
- Location: 394 Academy Road, Winnipeg, MB
- Construction started: 1930
- Completed: 1931
- Opened: December 24, 1931
- Renovated: 2019
- Cost: $300,000 CAD
- Renovation cost: $11 m CAD
- Owner: Globe Capital Management

Technical details
- Floor count: 3

Design and construction
- Architect: Max Blankstein

Heritage site
- Designation: Winnipeg Landmark Heritage Structure
- Recognized: December 8, 1986
- CRHP listing: October 25, 2006
- Recognition authority: City of Winnipeg
- ID: 6046

The Uptown Theatre building opened in 1931 as an atmospheric-style movie palace during the golden age of cinema. Holding just over 1,600 seats (1,200 on the first floor and 427 on the second), the theatre screened The Brat (1931) on its opening night.

In 1960, the cinema was turned into a bowling alley called Uptown Bowling Lanes (or Academy Uptown Lanes). Opened in September that year, the new Academy Lanes completely converted the interior of the former theatre and included 30 bowling alleys.

With the bowling alley relocating in April 2018, construction began in 2019 to transform the building into a mixed-use commercial and 23-suite apartment complex, adding additional floors. Now called Uptown Lofts, the project was completed in February 2021.

=== Julia Clark School ===
Julia Clark School
- Alternative names: Children’s Home of Winnipeg; Children’s Home School; Assiniboia Indian Residential School

General information
- Location: 615 Academy Road, Winnipeg, MB
- Coordinates: 49.87528°N 97.19982°W
- Opened: 1918
- Cost: ~$19,400 CAD

Design and construction
- Architect: J. B. Mitchell
- Main contractor: Fraser and Macdonald

Heritage site
- Designation: Winnipeg Landmark Heritage Structure
- Recognized: October 28, 1997
- CRHP listing: October 29, 2007
- Recognition authority: City of Winnipeg
- ID: 8132

The former Julia Clark School building (615 Academy), currently functions as the office of the Canadian Centre for Child Protection including Child Find Manitoba.

Acquired in 1915, the site (615-621 Academy) originally served an orphanage of the Children's Home of Winnipeg, opening on 18 March 1916 by Mayor Richard Deans Waugh. School classes also were held in the structure until a separate building was established on the grounds two years later.

In the fall of 1918, the Government of Manitoba funded the construction of a school at the site, which would be named the Julia Clark School in 1920 after one of the Home's early directors, Julia Jane Murray Clark. The 2-storey schoolhouse held 4 classrooms, and—though not really a public school—its operating costs were covered by the Winnipeg School Division, who also provided its teaching staff.

With the Children's Home relocating to Assiniboine Avenue in February 1945, following World War II, the former buildings at 615 Academy were taken by the federal Department of Veterans Affairs as an annex to its convalescent hospital at Deer Lodge in St. James.

Veterans Affairs left the site in 1958, when it was turned into the Assiniboia Indian Residential School, which operated until June 1973. From 1972 to 1993, Parks Canada used the facility for artifact storage. In the early 1980s, the dormitories of the former Home were demolished and replaced by a forensic science laboratory for the RCMP.

Today, what remains on the grounds is the original school building (opened in 1918) and the gymnasium/chapel (opened in 1966).

==== Assiniboia Indian Residential School ====
The Assiniboia Indian Residential School operated from September 1958 until June 1973 as one of 17 residential schools in Manitoba and the only one in Winnipeg. The school was funded by the federal government and operated by the Grey Nuns and Oblate Fathers.

Operating as a high school (grades 8–12) until 1967, it brought in thousands of children from other schools—holding 600 students from First Nations throughout Manitoba (and Northern Ontario), aged 15 to 20. One of its attendants was Phil Fontaine, the former National Chief of the Assembly of First Nations who was a key figure in forming the Indian Residential Schools Settlement Agreement. As Assiniboine was Manitoba's first urban residential high school, survivors of the school have noted that life at Assiniboia was an improvement from the conditions of their prior residential schools; however, the systematically-forced assimilation was much the same.

Beginning in 1959, the school entered teams in Greater Winnipeg Minor Hockey Association leagues. Though few had formal hockey training, the rosers were made up of young Indigenous men from Cree, Ojibway, Anisininew, Dakota, and Sioux First Nations. In 1960, the school entered a team in the MAHA Provincial Playdowns. Assiniboia advanced to the Provincial final against Pilot Mound and won their first Baldy Northcott Provincial Junior 'B' title.

From 1967 until its closing in 1973, it operated as a hostel, with students living in the dormitories and attending St. Charles Academy, Daniel McIntyre Collegiate, R.B. Russell, Gordon Bell, Earl Grey, J.B. Mitchell, Silver Heights, Grant Park High School, St. Mary's Academy, and Kelvin High School. The hostel was known as Assiniboia Hostel from 1967 to 1968, and Assiniboia Student Residence from 1968 to 1973.
