= Winnipeg Route 70 =

City route in Winnipeg, Canada

Route 70
- Sherbook Street / Maryland Street; Academy Road; Stafford Street
- Route 70 highlighted in red
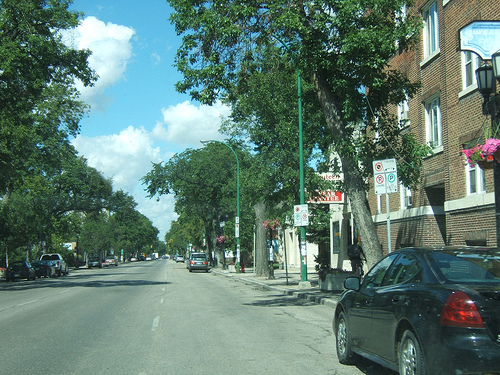
- Maryland Street heading north

Route information
- Maintained by City of Winnipeg
- Length: 5.5 km (3.4 mi)
- Existed: 1966–present

Major junctions
- South end: Route 42 (Pembina Hwy)
- Route 105 (Grant Ave); Route 95 (Corydon Ave); PTH 1 (TCH) (Broadway); Route 85 (Portage Ave)
- North end: Route 57 (Notre Dame Ave)

Location
- Country: Canada
- Province: Manitoba

Highway system
- Provincial highways in Manitoba; Winnipeg City Routes
← Route 62	→ Route 80

Route 70 is a city route in Winnipeg, Manitoba, Canada. It runs from Route 57 (Notre Dame Avenue) to Route 42 (Pembina Highway).

== Route Description ==
The route has many street names along its length, listed as follows, north to south:

Street Name	Speed limit	From	To
Stafford Street	50 km/h	Pembina Hwy (Route 42)	Academy Road
Academy Road	50 km/h	Stafford Street	Maryland Bridge
Sherbrook Street (one-way northbound)	50 km/h	Maryland Bridge	Notre Dame Ave (Route 57)
Maryland Street (one-way southbound)	50 km/h	Maryland Bridge	Notre Dame Ave (Route 57)

== Street Names ==
Both Maryland and Sherbrook Streets were originally named Boundary and Milligan Streets. Boundary Street ran along the original western boundary of Winnipeg before the city expanded westward to St. James Street in 1882. Maryland Street is named after the Maryland estate that was formerly located on that road, which was owned by James Milligan, the namesake of Milligan Street.

Stafford Street is named after Ralph de Stafford, 1st Earl of Stafford.

== Major intersections ==
From south to north. The entire route is in Winnipeg.

Street Name	km	mi	Destinations	Notes
Stafford Street	0.0	0.0	Pembina Highway (Route 42)	No access to Route 42 north; Route 70 southern terminus
Stafford Street	0.7	0.43	Grant Avenue (Route 105)	
Stafford Street	1.4	0.87	Corydon Avenue (Route 95)	
Stafford Street	2.3	1.4	Academy Road	Route 70 turns onto Academy Road
Academy Road	2.7	1.7	Wellington Crescent	
Assiniboine River	2.9	1.8	Maryland Bridge	
Assiniboine River	2.9	1.8	One-way transition	Academy Road east end; Route 70 north follows Sherbrook Street; Route 70 south follows Maryland Street
Sherbrook Street (northbound); Maryland Street (southbound)	3.8	2.4	Broadway (PTH 1)	
Sherbrook Street (northbound); Maryland Street (southbound)	4.1	2.5	Portage Avenue (Route 85) / YH	
Sherbrook Street (northbound); Maryland Street (southbound)	5.4– 5.5	3.4– 3.4	Notre Dame Avenue / Cumberland Avenue (Route 57)	Route 57 one-way transition; Route 70 northern terminus; Mayland Street northern terminus; Sherbrooke Street becomes two-way traffic north of Notre Dame Avenue
Sherbrook Street	6.3	3.9	Logan Avenue (Route 47)	
1.000 mi = 1.609 km; 1.000 km = 0.621 mi: Closed/former; Incomplete access; Route transition
