= Wellington Crescent =

- Neighbourhood
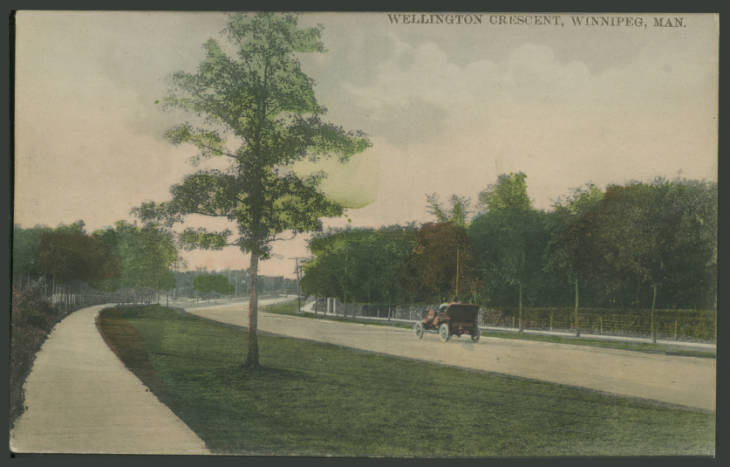
- Postcard of Wellington Crescent in 1908
- Interactive map of Wellington Crescent
- Coordinates: 49.8765°N 97.1806°W
- Country: Canada
- Province: Manitoba
- City: Winnipeg
- City Ward: River Heights-Fort Garry

Area
  - Land: 1.0 km^{2} (0.39 sq mi)

Population (2016)
  - Total: 1,655
  - Density: 1,703/km^{2} (4,410/sq mi)

Racial Group (2016)
  - White: 83.9%
  - Aboriginal: 7.6%
  - Visible minority: 8.5%

Wellington Crescent is an affluent neighbourhood in Winnipeg, Manitoba, Canada. It is known for its stately homes and for a small commercial area along Academy Road.

It is in the northern section of the River Heights community area, along the Assiniboine River, which marks the neighbourhood's northern boundary. Its other boundaries are Academy Road to the south, and the train tracks to the west.

== Demographics and crime ==
With a total land area of 1 km^{2} (0.39 mi^{2}) and a total population of 1,655 residents, Wellington Crescent has a population density of 1,703/km^{2} (4,410/sq mi) according to the 2016 census.

Wellington Crescent is one of Winnipeg's wealthier neighbourhoods, with a median household income of CA$153,349 in 2015, more than double the city's total median of $68,331. The 615 dwellings in Wellington Crescent are worth an average of $686,148.

=== Crime ===
Wellington Crescent has low rates of violent crime. In 2012, there was only one robbery, making the rate 62.3 per 100,000 residents. The break-and-enter rate was 996.9 per 100,000 residents and there were two attempted auto theft, but no actual cars stolen.

Crime stats, rolling 12-month total
Offense category	Jan 2020	Jan 2021	Jan 2022
Property crimes	204	169	162
Violent crimes	22	10	16
Other crimes	7	10	6
Controlled Drugs and Substances Act	2		
Criminal Code traffic violations	4	10	1
Total	239	199	185
