= Gordon Churchill =

Canadian politician (1898–1985)

The Honourable Gordon Minto Churchill PC DSO
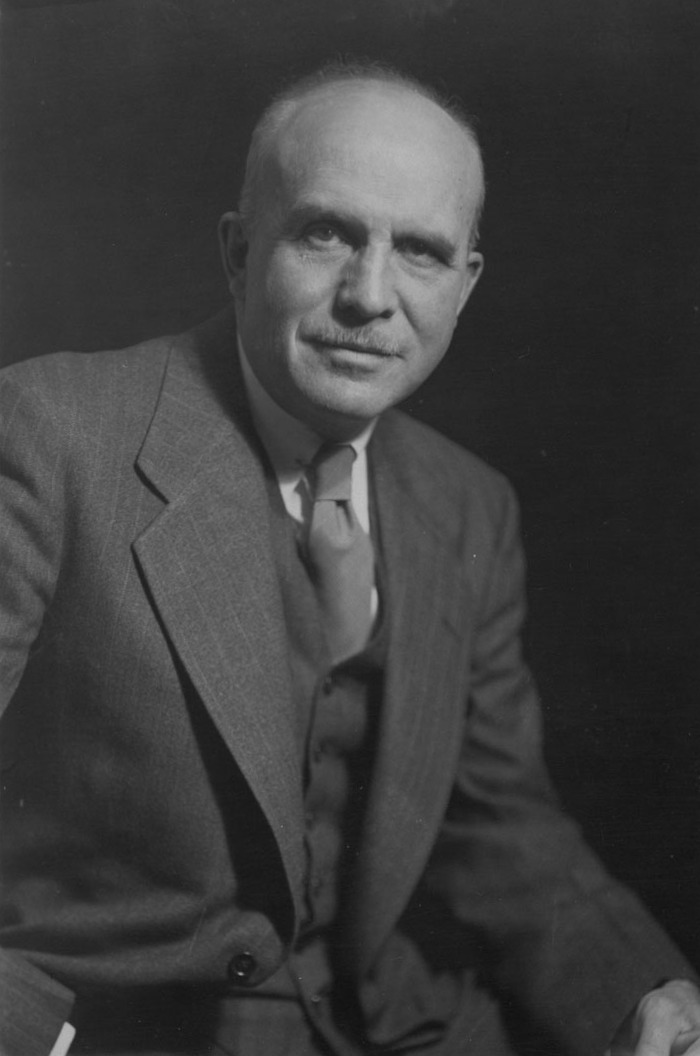
- Churchill, c. 1940s

Minister of National Defence
- In office February 12, 1963 – April 21, 1963
- Prime Minister: John Diefenbaker
- Preceded by: Vacant
- Succeeded by: Paul Hellyer

Member of Parliament for Winnipeg South Centre
- In office June 25, 1951 – June 24, 1968
- Preceded by: Ralph Maybank
- Succeeded by: Edmund Boyd Osler

Personal details
- Born: November 8, 1898 Coldwater, Ontario, Canada
- Died: August 3, 1985 (aged 86) Victoria, British Columbia, Canada

Military service
- Allegiance: Canada
- Years of service: 1916-1919; 1939-1945
- Rank: Gunner; Lieutenant Colonel

Gordon Minto Churchill PC DSO (November 8, 1898 – August 3, 1985) was a Canadian politician. He served in the Legislative Assembly of Manitoba from 1946 to 1949 as an independent, and in the House of Commons of Canada from 1951 to 1968 as a Progressive Conservative. He served in the cabinet of Prime Minister John Diefenbaker.

== Early life ==
The son of J. W. Churchill and Mary Shier, Churchill was educated in Port Arthur, Ontario, at United College in Winnipeg and at the University of Manitoba, where he received a Master of Arts degree and a law degree. He worked as a teacher and school principal, and served as president of the Manitoba Teachers' Society. He belonged to the law firm of Haig and Haig, which was founded by the family of Conservative politician John Thomas Haig. In 1922, he married Mona Mary McLachlin.

== Military service ==
Churchill saw action in both World Wars. He served overseas in World War I from 1916 to 1919 operating a Vickers Machine Gun. During World War II, he served with the Fort Garry Horse, the 12th Manitoba Dragoons, the Elgin Regiment and 1st Canadian Carrier Regiment in Northwestern Europe. In 1945, he was appointed Dean of Faculty at Khaki University in England.

== Political career ==
Churchill's political career began in January 1946, when he was elected to the Manitoba legislature in a special by-election for Manitobans in the Canadian Army, who had not been able to cast ballots in the 1945 provincial election. Although he had ties to the Progressive Conservative Party, he served in the legislature as an independent. He resigned from the Manitoba legislature in 1949 to run for the Canadian House of Commons in the riding of Winnipeg South Centre. He finished a distant second to incumbent Liberal candidate Ralph Maybank. Maybank resigned two years later, and Churchill ran in the ensuing by-election, which he won by less than 800 votes. He was returned by greater margins in the 1953 and 1957 general elections.

Churchill was a key adviser to Progressive Conservative Party leader John Diefenbaker during this period, and was widely credited with developing the strategy that propelled the Tories to victory in 1957. The Liberal Party of Louis St. Laurent had been in power since 1935, and appeared to have strong popular support. Prior to the 1957 election, Churchill wrote a confidential paper arguing that the Progressive Conservative Party could form government by targeting seats in the English-speaking provinces, and did not need to invest resources in Quebec. Diefenbaker followed this strategy, and won a minority government in 1957.

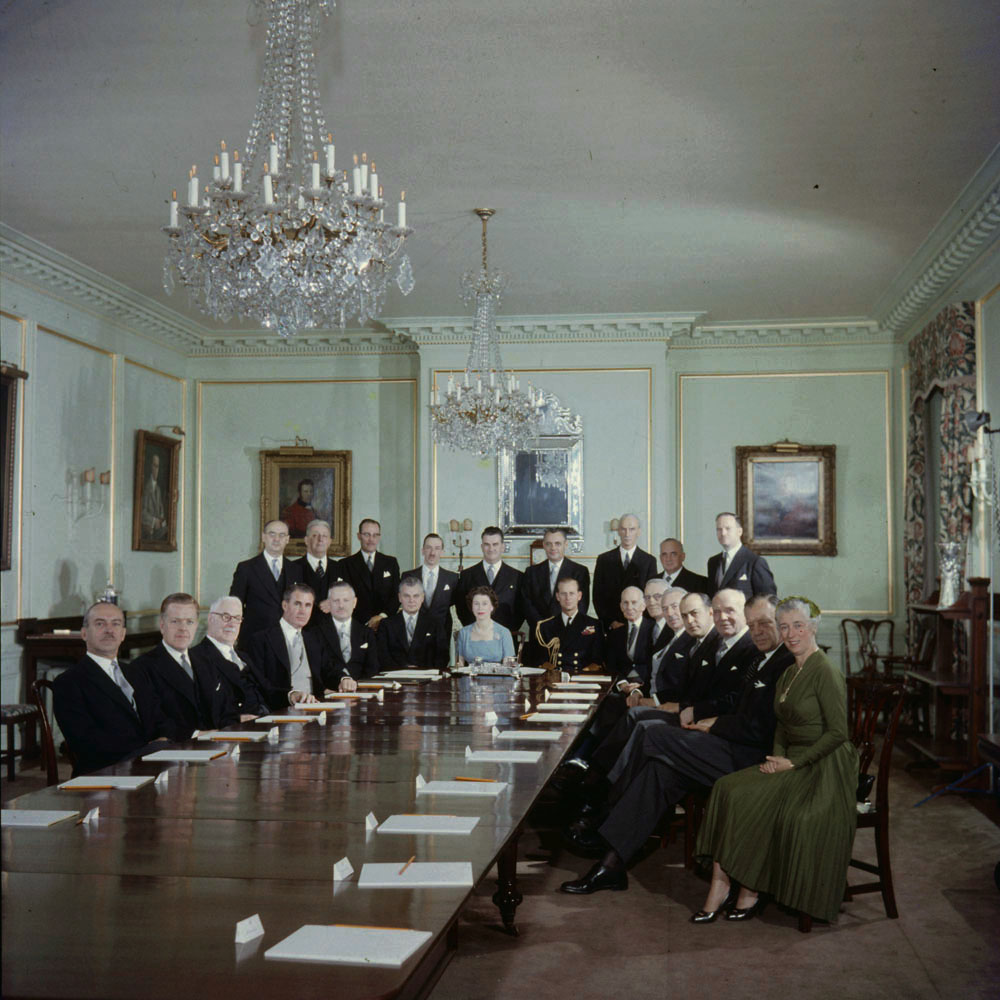
Queen Elizabeth and members of the federal government of Canada in Ottawa 1957-10-14

Churchill was appointed to Diefenbaker's cabinet on June 21, 1957 as Minister of Trade and Commerce. Later in the year, he led a 57-member trade delegation to the United Kingdom, touring firms throughout the country.

The Progressive Conservatives were re-elected with a large majority in the 1958 federal election; Churchill defeated his nearest opponent in Winnipeg South Centre by almost 20,000 votes. Churchill gave approval in 1959 for Canada's first commercial power nuclear reactor, a CANDU design, to be built at Douglas Point, Ontario. He also served as acting Leader of the Government in the House of Commons from January 14 to September 10, 1960, and was confirmed in this position on October 17, 1960. On October 11, he was named Minister of Veterans Affairs.

The Progressive Conservatives were reduced to a minority government in the 1962 federal election; Churchill's majority in Winnipeg South Center shrank to 2,000 votes. On February 12, 1963, he was promoted to Minister of National Defence. He had served only two months in this position when the Progressive Conservatives were defeated in the 1963 federal election; Churchill was personally re-elected with an even smaller majority. He served as Opposition House Leader in the Parliament which followed. In the 1965 federal election, which the Progressive Conservatives also lost, Churchill retained his seat by about 2,000 votes.

During the flag debates of the 1960s, Churchill referred to the flag which was eventually approved as a "piece of bunting". The Ottawa Citizen quoted him describing Prime Minister Lester Pearson as "a sawdust Caesar, reminding me of Mussolini, trying to force the country to accept his personal choice for a flag."

Churchill remained loyal to John Diefenbaker during the Progressive Conservative Party's internal quarrels of the 1960s, and worked for Diefenbaker at the party's 1967 leadership convention. When Diefenbaker dropped out of the race, he sent Churchill as an emissary to Dufferin Roblin's camp to endorse Roblin. In February 1968, Churchill attacked new Progressive Conservative leader Robert Stanfield for not forcing an election when the Liberal government of Lester Pearson was unexpectedly defeated in the house.

He left the Progressive Conservative caucus on February 27, 1968 to sit as an Independent Progressive Conservative, and did not run for re-election in the 1968 campaign.

== Archives ==
There is a Gordon Churchill fonds at Library and Archives Canada.

== Electoral history ==
1965 Canadian federal election: Winnipeg South Centre
Party	Candidate	Votes	%	±%
Progressive Conservative	Gordon Churchill	15,296	41.8	−0.7
Liberal	Fred Douglas	13,262	36.3	−3.2
New Democratic	Philip Petursson	7,234	19.8	+4.8
Social Credit	Walter Hatch	764	2.1	−0.9
Total valid votes		36,556	100.0	

1963 Canadian federal election: Winnipeg South Centre
Party	Candidate	Votes	%	±%
Progressive Conservative	Gordon Churchill	17,092	42.6	−0.4
Liberal	Fred Douglas	15,849	39.5	+2.3
New Democratic	Alistair Stewart	6,011	15.0	−1.5
Social Credit	Harold Bathgate	1,182	2.9	−0.4
Total valid votes		40,134	100.0	

1962 Canadian federal election: Winnipeg South Centre
Party	Candidate	Votes	%	±%
Progressive Conservative	Gordon Churchill	16,547	43.0	−23.6
Liberal	Ed Russenholt	14,306	37.2	+18.1
New Democratic	A.N. Robertson	6,357	16.5	+2.2
Social Credit	Asta Oddson	1,298	3.4	
Total valid votes		38,508	100.0	

Note: NDP vote is compared to CCF vote in 1958 election.

1958 Canadian federal election: Winnipeg South Centre
Party	Candidate	Votes	%	±%
Progressive Conservative	Gordon Churchill	27,722	66.6	+16.5
Liberal	Ronald Gillies	7,927	19.0	–6.2
Co-operative Commonwealth	Gordon Fines	5,975	14.4	–3.5
Total valid votes		41,624	100.0	

1957 Canadian federal election: Winnipeg South Centre
Party	Candidate	Votes	%	±%
Progressive Conservative	Gordon Churchill	19,022	50.1	
Liberal	Roy Richardson	9,592	25.3	
Co-operative Commonwealth	A. H. Mackling	6,778	17.9	
Social Credit	Asa Caswell	2,561	6.7	
Total valid votes		37,953	100.0	

1953 Canadian federal election: Winnipeg South Centre
Party	Candidate	Votes	%	±%
Progressive Conservative	Gordon Churchill	12,489	42.7	−0.9
Liberal	A.W. Hanks	9,752	33.3	−4.9
Co-operative Commonwealth	Gordon R. Fines	6,506	22.2	+4.1
Labor–Progressive	Roland Penner	504	1.7	
Total valid votes		29,251	100.0	

Canadian federal by-election, 25 June 1951
Party	Candidate	Votes	%	±%
On Mr. Maybank's resignation, 30 April 1951
Progressive Conservative	Gordon Churchill	6,009	43.6	+19.2
Liberal	Norman Wright	5,273	38.3	-16.4
Co-operative Commonwealth	Charles Biesick	2,497	18.1	-2.8
Total valid votes		13,779	100.0	

1949 Canadian federal election: Winnipeg South Centre
Party	Candidate	Votes	%	±%
Liberal	Ralph Maybank	14,747	54.7	+10.7
Progressive Conservative	Gordon Minto Churchill	6,593	24.4	+1.7
Co-operative Commonwealth	Andrew N. Robertson	5,632	20.9	−12.4
Total valid votes		26,972	100.0	
