= Edmund Boyd Osler =

Edmund Boyd Osler may refer to:

- Edmund Boyd Osler (Ontario politician) (1845–1924), first elected in 1896 as Conservative member for West Toronto, Ontario
- Edmund Boyd Osler (Manitoba politician) (1919–1987), first elected in 1968 as Liberal member for Winnipeg South Centre, Manitoba
