= 1st Canadian Armoured Carrier Regiment =

- Active: October 1944 – June 1945
- Country: Canada
- Branch: Canadian Army
- Type: Specialized armour
- Role: assault transport
- Size: 2 squadrons of 53 carriers (23 officers, 52 NCOs, 413 other)
- Nickname: Kangaroos
- Motto: Armatos fundit (Latin for 'bearing armed men')
- Colours: Orange and black

Commanders
- Notable commanders: Gordon Minto Churchill

The 1st Canadian Armoured Carrier Regiment (1CACR) (also known as the 1st Canadian Armoured Personnel Carrier Regiment) was an armoured regiment of the Canadian Army formed during the late stages of World War II in the north west European theatre. It was formed in October 1944 at Tilburg in the Netherlands, with the original 1st Canadian Armoured Personnel Carrier Squadron as its core. The new regiment's purpose was to serve as a specialized armoured unit equipped with modified tanks used to carry infantry safely to their objectives. The concept of such armoured personnel carriers was an entirely new innovation, and it was through the 1CACR's efforts that their effectiveness was proven, revolutionizing the tactical handling of infantry in battle. It was the only Canadian regiment to be both formed and disbanded overseas.

== Background ==
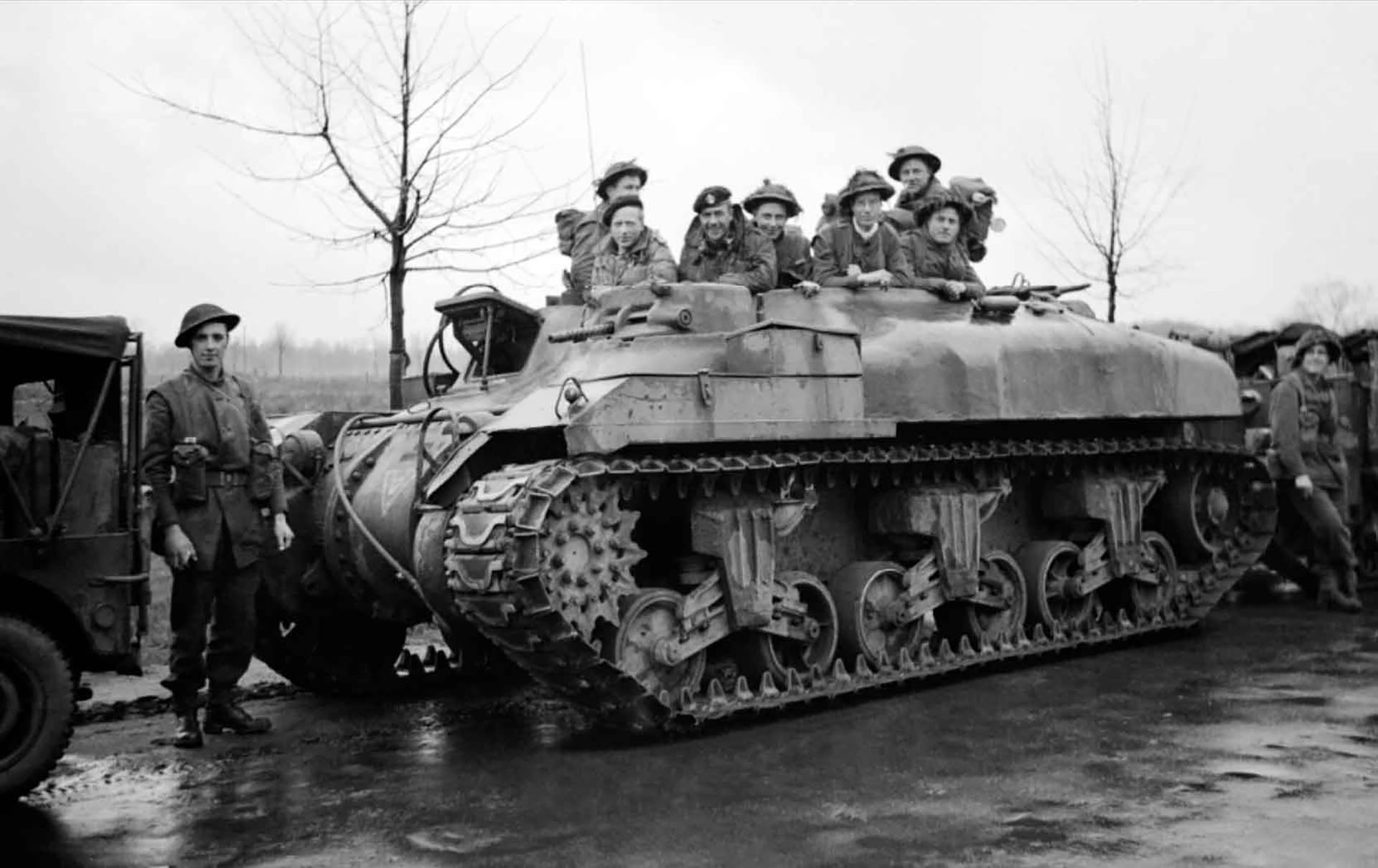
Infantry of the 53rd (Welsh) Division in a Ram Kangaroo on the outskirts of Ochtrup, Germany, 3 April 1945

The decision to convert redundant tanks into personnel carriers was inspired by Allied experiences during the D-Day landings, where British and Canadian forces experienced much lower casualty rates by leading attacks on German lines with armour than did the Americans, who led with an infantry assault. To General Guy Simonds, who was ordered to follow up the D-Day attacks with an assault on Falaise, this experience suggested both the usefulness of such armour-first tactics, as well as the further benefits of using armoured vehicles to transport troops, leading him to stress the issue while planning his assault, deeming it essential "...that the infantry must be carried in bullet-proof and splinter-proof vehicles to the actual objectives." No such vehicles existed at that time, and this idea thus marked the advent of what are now called armoured personnel carriers. Carriers were code-named "Kangaroos" partially after the codename of the Army Workshops Detachment that produced them, and partially because of the idea that infantry would be carried in the belly of the tank as safely as a young kangaroo in its mother's pouch.

The order to convert 72 Priests into carriers by the commencement of Operation Totalize on August 9 was given on July 31 by Brigadier C. M. Grant, the Deputy Director of Mechanical Engineering at Headquarters. Ultimately, 78 would be converted prior to the first engagement, in spite of the fact that the operation's start date had been advanced to August 7 by Simmonds although he had thought troops needed at least a week to train for using the new vehicles —an impressive feat, as the full engine overhaul included was generally a seven-day operation.

The drivers for the new vehicles were swiftly and secretly recruited from the Armoured Corps reinforcements, artillery units, and the Elgin Regiment, and were rushed into service with almost no training, first seeing action during the attack on Falaise on the night of August 7–8, 1944.

The attack on Falaise was carried out successfully, resulting in the capture of 200 tanks, 60 assault guns, 250 towed guns, and 2,500 motored vehicles from the Germans, as well as an unhindered six-day advance. The lead brigades of the assault had all been carried in the new Kangaroos, allowing them to move swiftly and providing the following results regarding the comparative casualties of the seven Canadian infantry battalions involved:

Mounted	The Royal Regiment of Canada	3 killed	25 wounded
	The Royal Hamilton Light Infantry	1 killed	14 wounded
	The Essex Scottish Regiment	3 killed	7 wounded
Marching	The Queen's Own Cameron Highlanders of Canada	30 killed	96 wounded
	Les Fusiliers Mont-Royal	8 killed	17 wounded
	The South Saskatchewan Regiment	16 killed	42 wounded
	The Calgary Highlanders	14 killed	37 wounded

Impressed by the carriers' performance, General Simonds began petitioning for the formation of a permanent carrier unit.

== History ==
On August 28, 1944, General Simonds' requests were granted, and the 1st Canadian Armoured Carrier Squadron was formed. The unit was established as four troops of 25 carriers (though only 55 vehicles were then available), with personnel consisting of a commanding officer (Major F. S. Corbeau), four troop commanders, and 100 drivers, and was attached to the 25th Canadian Armoured Delivery Regiment (The Elgin Regiment) for administrative purposes. When engaged in an operation, it would come "under command of various Infantry Brigades in turn." Each carrier had a .50-inch (12.7 mm) Browning heavy machine gun, and approximately 60% of the vehicles were equipped with radios, however, there was no co-driver to fire the gun or operate the wireless set.

After several months of operation, 21st Army Group concluded that the 1st Armoured Carrier Squadron was the best means to seize objectives and reduce infantry casualties, leading to the decision to form two armoured personnel carrier regiments — the British 49th Armoured Personnel Carrier Regiment for British Second Army, and the 1st Canadian Armoured Personnel Carrier Regiment for the First Canadian Army; both of which would belong to the 79th Armoured Division, with the 1CAPCR serving as the only Canadian regiment in the division. Official recognition of the change was delivered via the following proclamation:

"By authority of the GOC First Canadian Army, 19 October 1944, the 1st Canadian Armoured Personnel Carrier Squadron ceased to exist as a separate entity and became a squadron of the newly-created I Canadian Armoured Personnel Carrier Regiment. The Regiment to be commanded by Lieut. Col. Gordon M. Churchill, formerly 25th Canadian Armoured Delivery Regiment (The Elgin Regiment) and 10 Canadian Armoured Regiment (Fort Garry Horse) with Major F.K. Bingham, Sherbrooke Fusiliers and First Hussars as Second-in-Command. Regimental Headquarters to be at 83 Van Ryswich St., Antwerp."

Due to the inclusion of the 1CAPCR in the 79th Armoured Division, known for its wide array of speciality armoured fighting vehicles, the regiment was also classified as a secret activity—a principal reason for the scarcity of information regarding its activities.

After further petitioning on the part of Lieutenant-Colonel Churchill, the regiment was given its final title of the 1st Canadian Armoured Carrier Regiment on January 1, 1945. The regiment was both formed and ultimately disbanded in the Netherlands, without attachment to any regimental home, city, or province, and its personnel were drawn from all over Canada. In spite of its lack of a personal history, however, the regiment's high degree of success quickly moulded them into a cohesive unit of high morale. It ended its short history in the Canadian Army at the end of June 20, 1945.

== Battle honours ==
The regiment was granted the right to display the following battle honours:

- Le Havre
- Boulogne, 1944
- The Lower Maas
- The Roer
- The Rhineland
- The Reichswald
- Cleve
- Moyland Wood
- Goch-Calcar Road
- The Hochwald
- Xanten
- The Rhine
- Groningen
- North-West Europe, 1944–45

The presentation of their regimental (replica) guidon was finally made on September 10, 2011, at a drum head ceremony at the Elgin Regiment Armoury, St. Thomas, Ontario, Canada. The guidon shows the battle honours of Le Havre, The Roer, The Rhineland, The Reichswald, Cleve, Goch-Calcar Road, The Hochwald, The Rhine, Groningen and North-West Europe, 1944–45

== Equipment ==
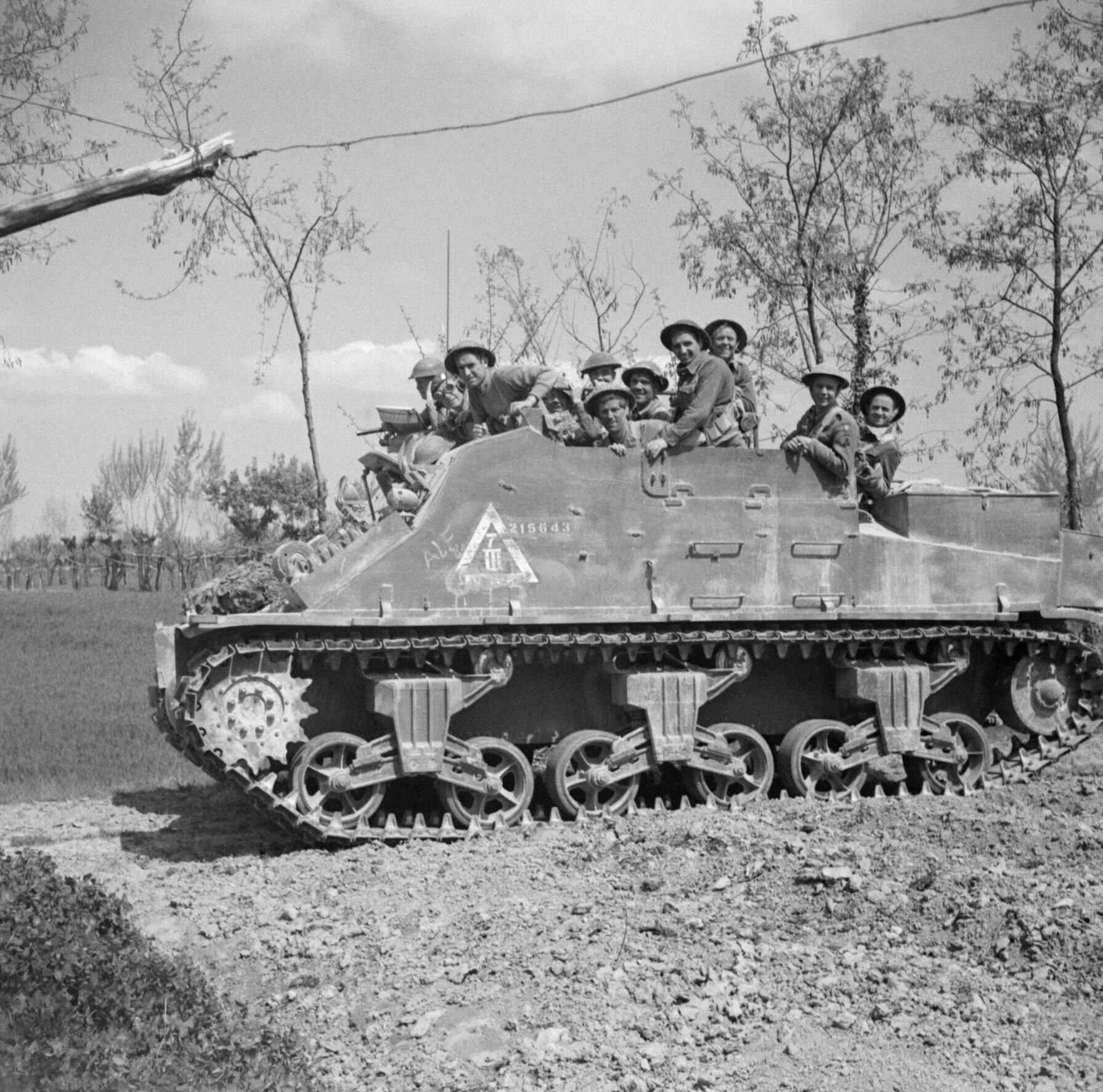
A Priest Kangaroo in Italy, April 1945

Modified US 105 mm M7 Priest Howitzer Motor Carriage. These vehicles were worn out and had been removed from service. The main armament – the 105 mm gun complete with mount and mantlet – was removed leading to the nickname "defrocked Priests". The engine was overhauled and the mechanicals checked. "Armour plate was placed over the gun mantelet opening and added to the vehicle sides." For some vehicles there was not enough steel of suitable quality, and the original opening was plated front and back and the gap between filled with sand.

The Priests were replaced by modified Ram medium tanks: The Canadian-designed and built Ram was largely considered a failure as a tank, being both underpowered and undergunned, but proved easy to modify into a superior personnel carrier. The removal of the turret, with the turret basket, produced an ideal low profiled, lighter weight carrier with low track pressure that allowed for superior manoeuvrability on soft ground. The addition of two .30-inch Browning machine guns also transformed the Rams into mobile machine gun nests, allowing them to force the enemy to keep their heads down until the transported infantry could debark. On occasion, by the time the Rams made it into position they found the enemy already ready to surrender without further engagement. Each carrier could hold 11 infantry and a two-man crew.

== Attached unit ==
The 123 Light Aid Detachment (LAD), Royal Canadian Electrical and Mechanical Engineers, under the command of Captain E. Duncan, were initially formed on an ad hoc basis in August 1944 to provide maintenance services to the carriers. When the regiment was formed, the LAD became an integral part of it and had a strength of 52 men.

The 1st Canadian Armoured Personnel Carrier Signal Troop was assigned to the regiment on November 1, 1944, under the command of Lieutenant Donald H. Simpson of the Royal Canadian Corps of Signals.
