= William Walker Kennedy =

Canadian politician

William Walker Kennedy, MC, QC (October 6, 1882 – February 10, 1963) was a distinguished Canadian politician and lawyer from Manitoba.

Born in Leeds County, Ontario, Kennedy pursued his education at Queen's University in Kingston, Ontario, before relocating to Manitoba in 1904. Initially, he spent two years as a journalist before enrolling in the University of Manitoba's law school. In 1909, he earned his law degree and subsequently was called to the bar.

During World War I, Kennedy demonstrated his dedication to service by joining the Canadian Expeditionary Force in November 1915. He served in France with the 46th Battalion from May 1917, earning recognition for his bravery at the Battle of Passchendaele, where he was wounded and received the Military Cross. Further commendations followed for his contributions to the Battle of Valenciennes, leading to field promotions to captain and then major before his discharge in 1919.

Transitioning back to civilian life, Kennedy ventured into politics and was elected to the House of Commons of Canada as the Conservative Member of Parliament for Winnipeg South Centre in the 1925 federal election. Despite his defeat in the 1926 federal election, he made a successful return to Parliament in the 1930 federal election.

Notably, Kennedy assumed the role of Chairman of the Royal Commission on Price Spreads and Mass Buying during Prime Minister R.B. Bennett's administration. This commission, commissioned to address concerns raised by cabinet member H.H. Stevens, underscored Kennedy's commitment to public service.

Following a political career marked by highs and lows, Kennedy faced defeat in the 1940 federal election and, for the final time, in the 1945 election, bringing an end to his impactful contributions to Canadian politics.

== Electoral history ==
1925 Canadian federal election: Winnipeg South Centre
Party	Candidate	Votes	%
Conservative	William Walker Kennedy	12,094	52.9
Liberal	Joseph Fergus Davidson	7,132	31.2
Labour	Alexander Henry	3,643	15.9
Total valid votes		22,869	100.0

1926 Canadian federal election: Winnipeg South Centre
Party	Candidate	Votes	%	±%
Liberal	Joseph Thorarinn Thorson	12,315	51.2	+20.0
Conservative	William Walker Kennedy	11,737	48.8	−4.1
Total valid votes		24,052	100.0	

1930 Canadian federal election: Winnipeg South Centre
Party	Candidate	Votes	%	±%
Conservative	William Walker Kennedy	17,355	56.0	+7.2
Liberal	Joseph Thorarinn Thorson	13,637	44.0	−7.2
Total valid votes		30,992	100.0	
Source: lop.parl.ca

1935 Canadian federal election: Winnipeg South Centre
Party	Candidate	Votes	%	±%
Liberal	Ralph Maybank	11,264	36.4	−7.6
Conservative	William Walker Kennedy	9,382	30.3	−25.7
Co-operative Commonwealth	Stanley Knowles	6,573	21.2	
Reconstruction	Alfred James Susans	2,642	8.5	
Social Credit	Arthur Brown	1,114	3.6	
Total valid votes		30,975	100.0	

1940 Canadian federal election: Winnipeg South Centre
Party	Candidate	Votes	%	±%
Liberal	Ralph Maybank	19,486	54.5	+18.1
National Government	William Walker Kennedy	10,698	29.9	−0.4
Co-operative Commonwealth	John Julius Swanson	5,576	15.6	−5.6
Total valid votes		35,760	100.0	

Note: "National Government" vote is compared to Conservative vote in 1935 election.

1945 Canadian federal election: Winnipeg South Centre
Party	Candidate	Votes	%	±%
Liberal	Ralph Maybank	16,389	44.0	−10.5
Co-operative Commonwealth	Lloyd Cleworth Stinson	12,393	33.3	+17.7
Progressive Conservative	Frank Edward Womersley	8,461	22.7	−7.2
Total valid votes		37,243	100.0	

Note: Progressive Conservative vote is compared to "National Government" vote in 1940 election.
