= 31 Combat Engineer Regiment (The Elgin's) =

- 31^{e} Régiment de génie de combat (The Elgin's)
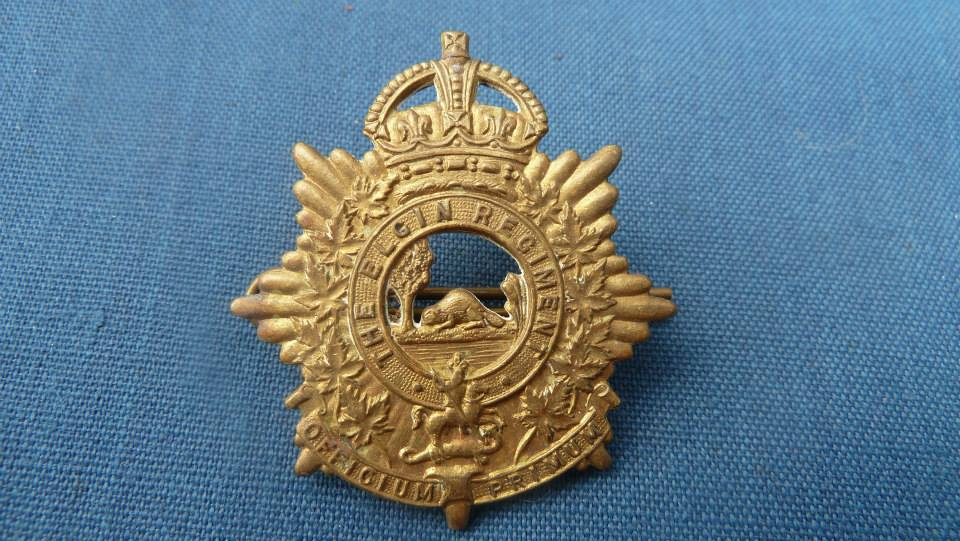
- 1920-pattern badge of the Elgin Regiment
- Active: 1866–present
- Country: Canada
- Branch: Canadian Military Engineers
- Role: Combat engineers
- Size: Two engineer squadrons
- Part of: 31 Canadian Brigade Group
- Garrison/HQ: St. Thomas, Ontario: HQ and 7 ES; Waterloo, Ontario: 48 FES.
- Nickname: The Elgins
- Mottos: Ubique (Latin for 'everywhere') and officium premum (Latin for 'duty first')
- Anniversaries: 4 December (St. Barbara's Day)
- Engagements: World War I; World War II; War in Afghanistan; Battle of Panjwaii; Operation Medusa

Commanders
- Commanding officer: LCol Scott Burke
- Colonel-in-chief: Earl of Elgin ex officio (presently Andrew Bruce, 11th Earl of Elgin)
- Honorary lieutenant-colonel: HLCol Mark Sargent
- RSM: CWO Arthur Churcher

Insignia
- Abbreviation: 31 CER (The Elgins)

31 Combat Engineer Regiment (31 CER or "The Elgin's"), is a combat engineer regiment of the Canadian Military Engineers. A Primary Reserve unit, it is part of 31 Canadian Brigade Group of the 2nd Canadian Division. It consists of two squadrons in southern Ontario: 48 Engineer Squadron in Waterloo and 7 Engineer Squadron in St. Thomas. Founded in 1866 as a militia infantry battalion in Elgin County, Canada West, the unit mobilized an armoured delivery unit for service in Europe during the Second World War. The militia unit was converted to armour in 1954 and then to combat engineering in 1997.

== History ==
31 CER perpetuates the Provincial Corps of Artificers, a unit associated with the War of 1812.

The regiment existed before the Confederation of Canada, tracing its origin to 1866 when the Militia Act officially created the 25th, Elgin, Battalion of Infantry from five local militia companies. It became the 25th Elgin Regiment in 1900, but was then disbanded in 1903, but re-formed the next year.

In 1915 the 91st Battalion (Elgin), CEF was raised in St. Thomas, Ontario, and went to fight in the First World War.

It became the Elgin Regiment in 1920, and was expanded to two battalions in 1921, the 1st Battalion (perpetuating 91st Battalion CEF), and the 2nd (Reserve) Battalion.

After the outbreak of the Second World War in 1939, the regiment was converted to armour in 1942 as the 25th Armoured Regiment (The Elgin Regiment).

Year	Change
1943	1st Canadian Tank Delivery Regiment
1943	25th Canadian Tank Delivery Regiment (The Elgin Regiment)
1943–45	25th Armoured Delivery Regiment (The Elgin Regiment) "A" & "B" Squadrons attached to 1st Canadian Armoured Brigade "C" Squadron attached to 2nd Canadian Armoured Brigade "D" Squadron attached to 4th Canadian Armoured Division "E" Squadron attached to II Canadian Corps "F" Squadron attached to First Canadian Army "G" Squadron attached to 5th Canadian Armoured Division "H" Squadron attached to I Canadian Corps
1946	The Elgin Regiment (Infantry)
1954	The Elgin Regiment (27th Armoured Regiment)
1958	The Elgin Regiment (RCAC)
1997	31 Combat Engineer Regiment (The Elgin's)
2004	48 Field Squadron is re-established in Waterloo, Ontario
2006	Both Field Squadrons renamed Engineer Squadrons as part of Land Force Reserve Restructure Phase 2.
2013	31 CER (The Elgin's) perpetuates 1st Canadian Armoured Carrier Regiment

The Elgin Regiment was awarded the battle honours Somme, 1916; Arras, 1917; Ypres, 1917; and Amiens after the First World War. The honours "Arras" and "Amiens" were selected to be borne on colours and appointments.

After the conversion to an engineer regiment in 1997, these honours became dormant, being replaced by the CME's honorary distinction ubique (Latin for 'everywhere').

During Canadian combat operations in Afghanistan, 31 CER sent members to augment Regular Force units for deployments while also acting as a "feeder" unit, training Reserve Force members who could then take full-time contracts with Regular Force combat engineer regiments.

Lineage chart

1812
1815
1856
1866
1900
1904
1915
1916
1920
1936
1940
1942
1943
1944
1945
1946
1954
1958
1997
2012

Provincial Corps of Artificers
Disbanded
Independent marine, infy and rifle coys
25th "Elgin Bn of Infy"
25th Elgin Regt
25th Regt
91st "Overseas" Bn, CEF
Absorbed by 12th, 35th, 36th, 37th, 38th and 39th Reserve Bn
1st Bn (91st Bn, CEF), The Elgin Regt
The Elgin Regt
The Elgin Regt, CASF	The Elgin Regt (Reserve)
25th Armd Regt (The Elgin Regt), CAC
25th Canadian Tank Delivery Regt (The Elgin Regt), CAC
25th Armd Delivery Regt (The Elgin Regt), CAC	1st Canadian Armd Carrier Regt
Disbanded
Disbanded	The Elgin Regt, RCIC
The Elgin Regt (27th Armd Regt)
The Elgin Regt (RCAC)
31 Combat Engineer Regt (The Elgin's)
Perpetuates War of 1812 unit

=== Afghanistan rotations ===
Year	Rotation	Members
2005	Task Force Kabul	2
	Kabul Camp Closure Team	7
2006	TF 3-06	10
2008	TF 3-08	2
2010	TF 1-10	7

== Perpetuations ==
- Provincial Corps of Artificers
- 91st Battalion (Elgin), CEF
- 1st Armoured Personnel Carrier Regiment - Canadian Forces General Message 089/23, 23 May 2023: "the perpetuation of the 1st Armoured Personnel Carrier Regiment by 31 Combat Engineer Regiment (The Elgins) is approved"

== Alliances ==
- United Kingdom - The Royal Regiment of Fusiliers
