= A. Daniel McKenzie =

Canadian politician (1924–1989)

Alvin Daniel McKenzie (25 March 1924 – 15 August 1989) was a Progressive Conservative party member of the House of Commons of Canada. McKenzie was born in Winnipeg, Manitoba and became a communication supervisor by career.

He won the seat for the Winnipeg South Centre electoral district in the 1972 federal election and won successive terms in the general elections of 1974, 1979, 1980 and 1984, becoming member for Winnipeg—Assiniboine after riding boundaries were rearranged in 1976.

In October 1987, during his last term, "Fighting Dan" became somewhat infamous for an incident where he shoved fellow MP John Nunziata (Liberal - York-South Weston) in the House of Commons. He was objecting to Nunziata's sitting in the Prime Minister's seat during a session of Committee of the Whole House.

McKenzie was also a proponent of the plan to annex the Turks and Caicos Islands into Confederation.

McKenzie left federal politics in 1988 and did not campaign for another term of office in that year's federal election. He served consecutive terms in the 29th through 33rd Canadian Parliaments.

== Electoral history ==
1974 Canadian federal election: Winnipeg South Centre
| Party | Candidate | Votes | % | ±% |
|---|---|---|---|---|
| Progressive Conservative | Dan McKenzie | 32,277 | 57.1 | +11.9 |
| Liberal | Doug McEwen | 15,956 | 28.2 | −8.1 |
| New Democratic | Andy Robertson | 7,823 | 13.8 | −4.7 |
| Social Credit | Monty A. McDonald | 365 | 0.6 | |
| Marxist–Leninist | Marnie Frain | 102 | 0.2 | |
| Total valid votes | | 56,523 | 100.0 | |

1972 Canadian federal election: Winnipeg South Centre
| Party | Candidate | Votes | % | ±% |
|---|---|---|---|---|
| Progressive Conservative | Dan McKenzie | 25,550 | 45.2 | +16.3 |
| Liberal | E. B. Osler | 20,516 | 36.3 | −15.5 |
| New Democratic | Harvey H. Moats | 10,460 | 18.5 | +0.6 |
| Total valid votes | | 56,526 | 100.0 | |
