= Winnipeg—Assiniboine =

Former federal electoral district in Manitoba, Canada

Winnipeg—Assiniboine was a federal electoral district in Manitoba, Canada, that was represented in the House of Commons of Canada from 1979 to 1988.

This riding was created in 1976 from parts of Portage, Winnipeg South and Winnipeg South Centre ridings. It was contested at federal elections in 1979, 1980, and 1984. For its entire history, its Member of Parliament was Progressive Conservative Dan McKenzie. He had served as the MP for Winnipeg South Centre since 1972.

It was abolished in 1987 through boundary redistribution. Its territory went to the Winnipeg South, Winnipeg South Centre, and Winnipeg—St. James ridings; the first two were re-established with considerably different territory than prior to the 1979 election. McKenzie retired from Parliament at the 1988 federal election when Winnipeg—Assiniboine's abolition took effect.

== Election results ==
1979 Canadian federal election
| Party | Candidate | Votes |
|---|---|---|
| Progressive Conservative | MCKENZIE, Dan | 28,192 |
| Liberal | MATAS, David | 13,668 |
| New Democratic | MELNYK, Max | 7,949 |
| Social Credit | STEVENS, Peter | 150 |
| Marxist–Leninist | SEGAL, Anne | 72 |

1980 Canadian federal election
| Party | Candidate | Votes |
|---|---|---|
| Progressive Conservative | MCKENZIE, Dan | 22,160 |
| Liberal | MATAS, David | 15,424 |
| New Democratic | MELNYK, Max | 7,304 |
| Independent | PENNER, Peter | 201 |
| Marxist–Leninist | KANTOROVIH, Rubin | 45 |

1984 Canadian federal election
| Party | Candidate | Votes |
|---|---|---|
| Progressive Conservative | MCKENZIE, Dan | 27,567 |
| Liberal | MATAS, John | 16,200 |
| New Democratic | JOHANNSON, Robert | 7,067 |
| Confederation of Regions | STEVENS, Lillian | 1,344 |
| Libertarian | KENZIE, Stephen | 472 |

== See also ==
- List of Canadian electoral districts
- Historical federal electoral districts of Canada
