= Wildwood Park, Winnipeg =

Neighbourhood in Winnipeg, Manitoba, Canada

Wildwood Park
- Neighbourhood
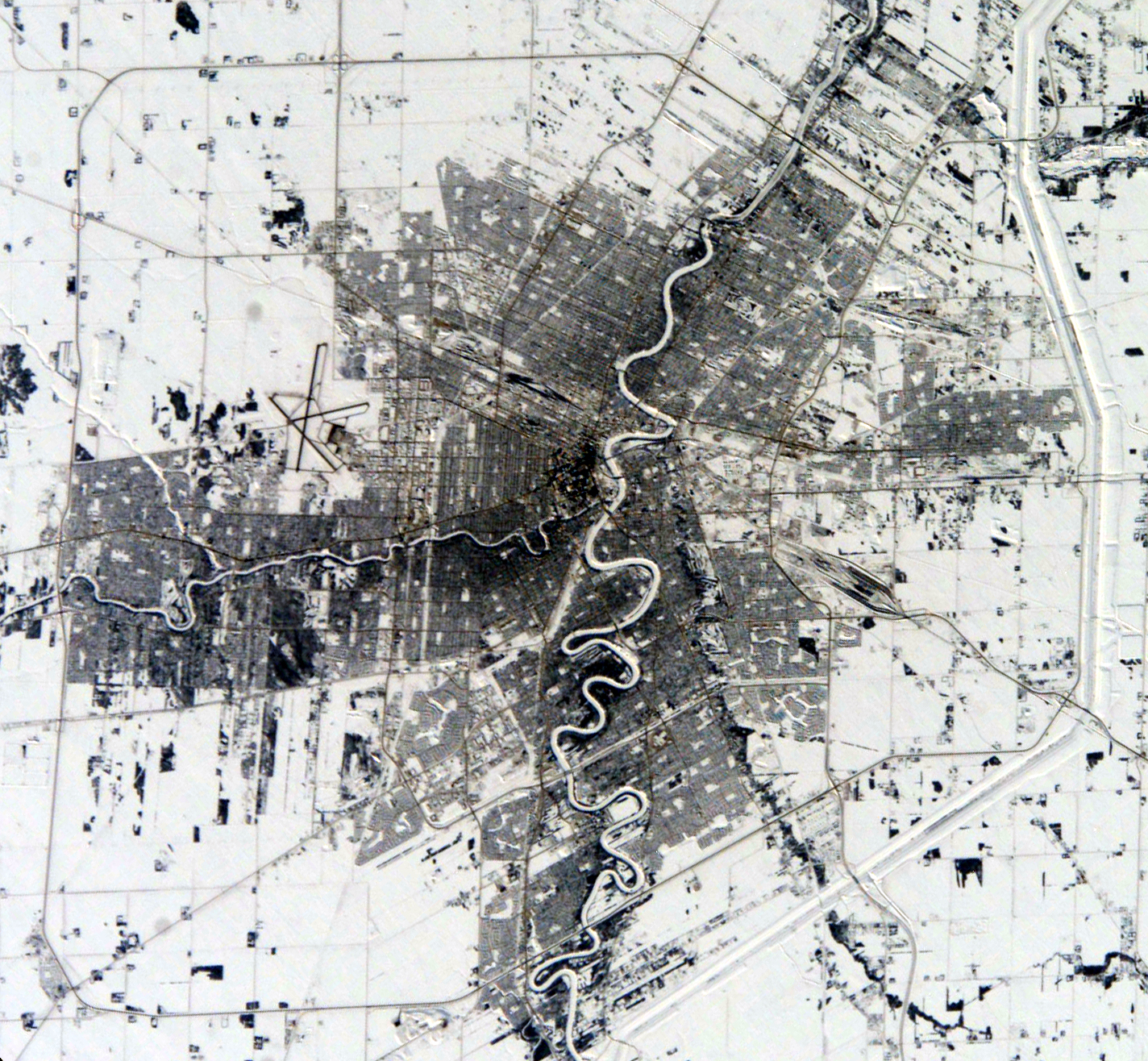
- Location within Winnipeg
- Coordinates: 49.847°N 97.13°W
- Country: Canada
- Province: Manitoba
- Region: Winnipeg Metro Region
- City ward: Fort Rouge–East Fort Garry
- Established: 1946–47

Government
  - MP: Ben Carr
  - MLA: Mark Wasyliw
  - Councillor: Sherri Rollins

Area
  - Neighbourhood: 1.3 km^{2} (0.50 sq mi)
  - Metro: 5,306.79 km^{2} (2,048.96 sq mi)
- Elevation: 232 m (761 ft)

Population (2016)
  - Neighbourhood: 1,130
  - Density: 870/km^{2} (2,300/sq mi)
  - Metro: 778,489
- Forward Sortation Area: R3T
- Area codes: Area codes 204 and 431

Wildwood Park (also spelled Wildewood) is a suburban, planned community in Winnipeg that has a central green space and no front roads (only back alleys), with communal walkways, playgrounds, and parks.

Nearly all of the original houses are based on five variations of three basic designs, pre-fabricated in one section of the site. The site plan concept is based on the Radburn community design of architects Henry Wright and Clarence Stein who advocated the idea of designing neighbourhoods for the "motor age". It varies from the original in the introduction of crescents (or loops) as the local access roads. It was developed in 1946–47 by Hubert Bird and designed by Green, Blankstein, Russell (GBR). It is well known as an early example of the Radburn pattern, which has found extensive application in the second half of the 20th century. It presages the emergence of the fused grid that uses the same principle of filtered permeability.

== Governance ==
Wildwood Park is in the Fort Rouge–East Fort Garry city ward and the Pembina Trails School Division of Winnipeg. It corresponds to Statistics Canada's census dissemination area 110466, in census tract 0503.00, within the Winnipeg census division, part of the Winnipeg census metropolitan area. It comprises much of the Wildwood neighbourhood of Winnipeg, within the Fort Garry North neighbourhood cluster (according to how census data is reported for the city of Winnipeg). It is in the Fort Garry provincial electoral division (Fort Garry-Riverview from 2011 to 2019) and the Winnipeg South Centre federal electoral division (Winnipeg South prior to 2004). Before the unicity amalgamation in 1972, this was part of the Rural Municipality of Fort Garry.
