= 91st Battalion (Elgin), CEF =

Infantry battalion of CEF

91st (Elgin) Battalion, CEF
- Active: 1915–1916
- Disbanded: 21 May 1917
- Country: Canada
- Branch: Canadian Expeditionary Force
- Type: Infantry
- Mobilization headquarters: St. Thomas, Ontario
- Motto: Duty First
- Battle honours: The Great War, 1916

Commanders
- Officer commanding: LCol W.J. Green

The 91st (Elgin) Battalion, CEF, was an infantry battalion of the Canadian Expeditionary Force in World War I. (One must avoid confusing it with the 91st Regiment Canadian Highlanders of the Canadian Non-Permanent Active Militia, headquartered in Hamilton, Ontario - a completely separate and distinct unit - which recruited for various other CEF overseas battalions, particularly the 16th, 19th and 173rd Battalions.)

== History ==
The 91st Battalion was authorized on 22 December 1915 and embarked for Britain on 29 June 1916, where its personnel were absorbed by the 12th, 35th, 36th, 37th, 38th and 39th Reserve Battalions on 15 July 1916 to provide reinforcements for the Canadian Corps in the field. The battalion disbanded on 21 May 1917.

The 91st Battalion recruited in Elgin County and was mobilized at St. Thomas, Ontario.

The 91st Battalion was commanded by Lieutenant-Colonel W.J. Green from 28 June 1916 to 15 July 1916. The 91st Battalion was awarded the battle honour The Great War, 1916.

The battalion was presented a stand of colours (King's colour and regimental colour) in Pinafore Park, St. Thomas, on 24 May 1916. The colours were inherited by the perpetuating unit (The Elgin Regiment) and were laid up in Trinity Anglican Church in St. Thomas in 1935. When the church was deconsecrated in 2020, the colours were removed for relocation, but they deteriorated rapidly and could not be laid up again. The colours were burned, and on 5 November 2023, the ashes were interred in W.J. Green's grave in the St. Thomas Cemetery.

== Perpetuation ==
The 91st (Elgin) Battalion, CEF is perpetuated by 31 Combat Engineer Regiment (The Elgins).

== See also ==
- List of infantry battalions in the Canadian Expeditionary Force

== Sources ==
- Canadian Expeditionary Force 1914–1919 by Col. G. W. L. Nicholson, CD, Queen's Printer, Ottawa, Ontario, 1962
