= Joseph Thorarinn Thorson =

Canadian politician (1889–1978)

The Honourable Joseph T. Thorson PC

Member of Parliament for Winnipeg South Centre
- In office September 14, 1926 – July 28, 1930
- Preceded by: William Walker Kennedy
- Succeeded by: William Walker Kennedy

Member of Parliament for Selkirk
- In office October 13, 1935 – August 9, 1943
- Preceded by: James Herbert Stitt
- Succeeded by: William Bryce

Personal details
- Born: March 15, 1889 Winnipeg, Manitoba, Canada
- Died: July 6, 1978 (aged 89) Ottawa, Ontario, Canada
- Party: Liberal
- Occupation: Politician; lawyer

Joseph Thorarinn Thorson, PC (March 15, 1889 – July 6, 1978) was a lawyer and politician who represented the ridings of Winnipeg South Centre and Selkirk as a Member of Parliament (MP) in the House of Commons of Canada.

He was a Rhodes Scholar, and a veteran of World War I.

He was the Liberal Member of Parliament for the ridings of Winnipeg South Centre (1926—1930) and Selkirk (1935—1942). From 1941 to 1942, he was the Minister of National War Services in the cabinet of William Lyon Mackenzie King.

In 1942, he was made President of the Exchequer Court of Canada.

Cartoonist Charles Thorson was his younger brother. He married Alleen B. Scarth on December 30, 1916, and had three children.

== Electoral history ==
1930 Canadian federal election: Winnipeg South Centre
Party	Candidate	Votes	%	±%
Conservative	William Walker Kennedy	17,355	56.0	+7.2
Liberal	Joseph Thorarinn Thorson	13,637	44.0	−7.2
Total valid votes		30,992	100.0	
Source: lop.parl.ca

1926 Canadian federal election: Winnipeg South Centre
Party	Candidate	Votes	%	±%
Liberal	Joseph Thorarinn Thorson	12,315	51.2	+20.0
Conservative	William Walker Kennedy	11,737	48.8	−4.1
Total valid votes		24,052	100.0	
