= Ralph Maybank =

Canadian politician

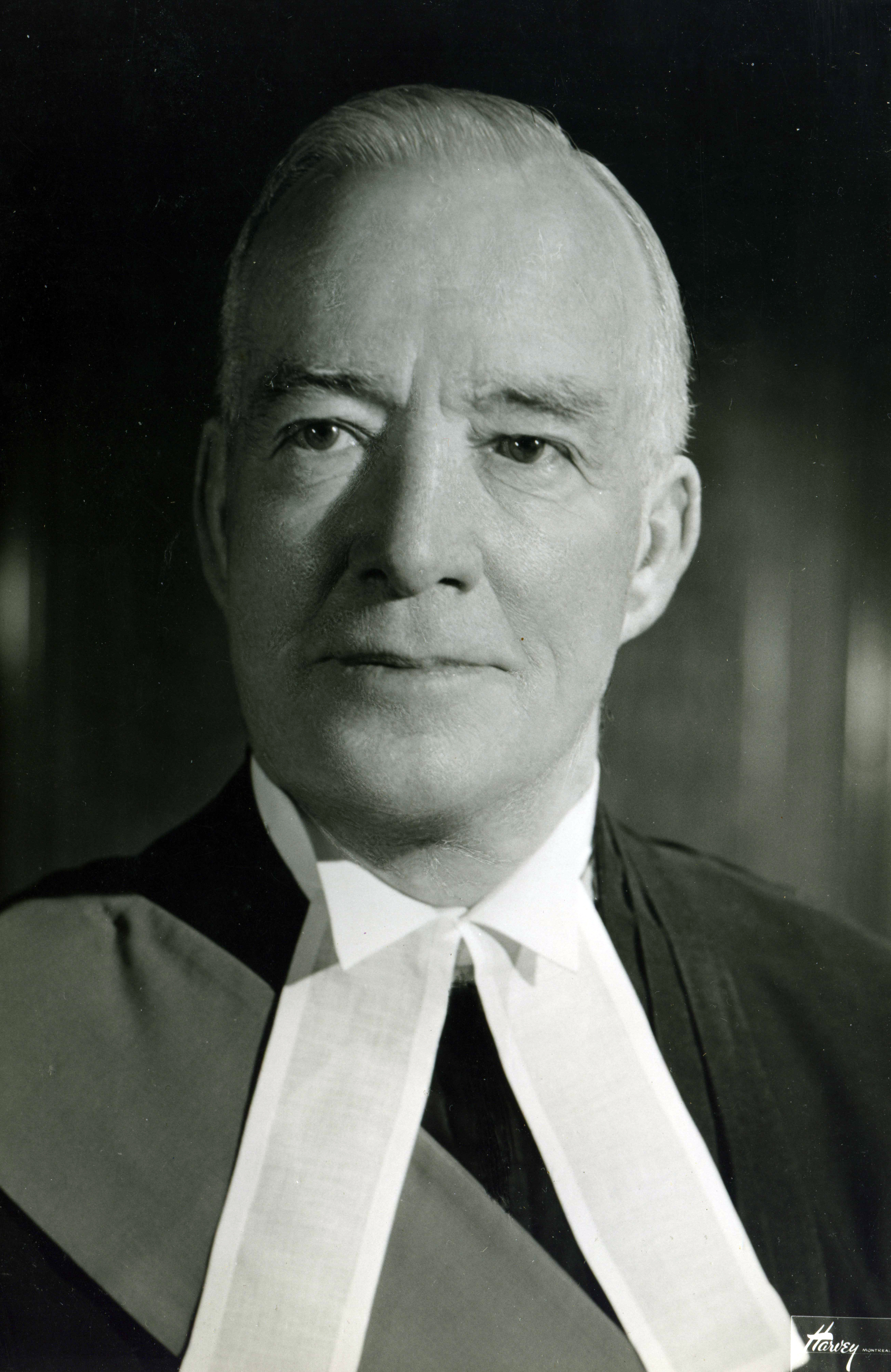
Judge Ralph Maybank

H. Ralph Maybank (August 17, 1890 – March 19, 1965) was a politician from Manitoba, Canada. He served in the Legislative Assembly of Manitoba from 1932 to 1935, and in the House of Commons of Canada from 1935 to 1951. Maybank was a member of the Liberal Party of Canada.

The son of John Maybank and Marion Bates, Maybank was born in London, Ontario. He served in the Royal Flying Corps during World War I. He was educated at the University of Manitoba, receiving a Bachelor of Arts degree (1919) and a law degree (1922). He was called to the Manitoba bar in 1923. In 1927, Maybank married Dora Boys.

He first ran for the Manitoba legislature in the provincial election of 1927, in the Winnipeg constituency. At the time, Winnipeg elected ten members via a single transferable ballot. Maybank, running as a Liberal, finished seventeenth on the first count and was not elected.

From 1929 to 1931, Maybank served as a member of Winnipeg city council.

In 1932, the governing Progressive Party of Manitoba formed an electoral alliance with the Liberal Party, and government members subsequently became known as Liberal-Progressives. Maybank again ran in Manitoba, finished tenth on the first count, and narrowly won election for the final seat. On the final count, he defeated Leslie Morris by 309 votes for tenth place. Had Morris been elected, he would have been the first Communist to serve in a provincial legislature in Canada.

For the next three years, Maybank served as a backbench supporter of John Bracken's government. He resigned his seat on October 1, 1935, to run for the Canadian House of Commons in the 1935 federal election. He elected for the riding of Winnipeg South Centre, defeated Conservative candidate William Walker Kennedy and Cooperative Commonwealth Federation candidate Stanley Knowles. The Liberal Party won this election, and Maybank served as a backbench supporter of William Lyon Mackenzie King's government.

Maybank defeated Kennedy a second time in the 1940 election, and defeated future Manitoba Cooperative Commonwealth Federation leader Lloyd Stinson by 3,996 votes in the 1945 election. On November 30, 1947, he was promoted to parliamentary assistant to the Minister of National Health and Welfare. On January 25, 1949, he was named assistant to the Minister of Mines and Resources.

Maybank defeated Progressive Conservative Gordon Churchill in the 1949 federal election. On January 24, 1951, he was named parliamentary assistant to the Minister of Resources and Development. He resigned his seat on March 30, 1951.

In the 1940s, Maybank led a revolt of Liberal Members of Parliament from western Canada against a proposed rise in the cross-border tariff. They were successful, and the tariff increase was set aside.

In July 1951, he was named to the Manitoba Court of King's Bench. He died in Winnipeg while still a judge.

There is currently a Ralph Maybank School in Winnipeg, and the surrounding area is known as Maybank.

Maybank had three sons: John (deceased), Roger, and Micky (deceased).

== Electoral history ==
1949 Canadian federal election: Winnipeg South Centre
Party	Candidate	Votes	%	±%
Liberal	Ralph Maybank	14,747	54.7	+10.7
Progressive Conservative	Gordon Minto Churchill	6,593	24.4	+1.7
Co-operative Commonwealth	Andrew N. Robertson	5,632	20.9	−12.4
Total valid votes		26,972	100.0	

1945 Canadian federal election: Winnipeg South Centre
Party	Candidate	Votes	%	±%
Liberal	Ralph Maybank	16,389	44.0	−10.5
Co-operative Commonwealth	Lloyd Cleworth Stinson	12,393	33.3	+17.7
Progressive Conservative	Frank Edward Womersley	8,461	22.7	−7.2
Total valid votes		37,243	100.0	

Note: Progressive Conservative vote is compared to "National Government" vote in 1940 election.

1940 Canadian federal election: Winnipeg South Centre
Party	Candidate	Votes	%	±%
Liberal	Ralph Maybank	19,486	54.5	+18.1
National Government	William Walker Kennedy	10,698	29.9	−0.4
Co-operative Commonwealth	John Julius Swanson	5,576	15.6	−5.6
Total valid votes		35,760	100.0	

Note: "National Government" vote is compared to Conservative vote in 1935 election.

1935 Canadian federal election: Winnipeg South Centre
Party	Candidate	Votes	%	±%
Liberal	Ralph Maybank	11,264	36.4	−7.6
Conservative	William Walker Kennedy	9,382	30.3	−25.7
Co-operative Commonwealth	Stanley Knowles	6,573	21.2	
Reconstruction	Alfred James Susans	2,642	8.5	
Social Credit	Arthur Brown	1,114	3.6	
Total valid votes		30,975	100.0	
