= Winnipeg South Centre =

Federal electoral district in Manitoba, Canada

Coordinates: 49.862°N 97.165°W

Manitoba electoral district
- Interactive map of riding boundaries from the 2025 federal election

Federal electoral district
- Legislature: House of Commons
MP
Ben Carr
Liberal
- District created: 1987
- First contested: 1988
- Last contested: 2025
- District webpage: profile, map

Demographics
- Population (2011): 90,711
- Electors (2015): 67,988
- Area (km²): 46
- Pop. density (per km²): 1,972
- Census division: Division No. 11
- Census subdivision: Winnipeg (part)

Winnipeg South Centre (French: Winnipeg-Centre-Sud) is a federal electoral district in Manitoba, Canada, that has been represented in the House of Commons of Canada from 1925 to 1979 and since 1988.

== Geography ==
The district includes the neighbourhoods of Beaumont, Brockville, Buffalo, Chevrier, Crescent Park, Crescentwood, Earl Grey, Ebby-Wentworth, Edgeland, Fort Garry, Grant Park, J.B. Mitchell, Linden Woods, Lord Roberts, Mathers, Maybank, McMillan, Osborne Village, Parker, Pembina Strip, Point Road, River Heights, Riverview, Rockwood, Roslyn, Sir John Franklin, Wellington Crescent and Wildwood Park in the city of Winnipeg.

The Liberals tend to win their most votes in River Heights and adjacent neighbourhoods like Wellington Crescent. They are also strong in Roslyn. The Conservatives tend to do best in Tuxedo and Brockville. The NDP tends to do the best in Osborne Village.

== Demographics ==
According to the 2021 Canadian census

Languages: 77.1% English, 2.5% French, 1.7% Tagalog, 1.6% Punjabi, 1.5% Spanish, 1.5% Mandarin, 1.5% German
Religions: 44.1% Christian (16.3% Catholic, 5.2% United Church, 3.7% Anglican, 1.9% Anabaptist, 1.9% Orthodox, 1.8% Lutheran, 13.3% Others), 6.4% Jewish, 2.7% Muslim, 2.3% Hindu, 1.8% Sikh, 40.8% No religion
Median income (2020): $44,000
Average income (2020): $63,850

Panethnic groups in Winnipeg South Centre (2011−2021)
Panethnic group	2021		2016		2011	
Panethnic group	Pop.	%	Pop.	%	Pop.	%
European (Note: Statistic includes all persons that did not make up part of a visible minority or an indigenous identity.)	63,430	68.5%	66,905	74.18%	70,395	79.66%
Indigenous	7,650	8.26%	6,900	7.65%	5,830	6.6%
South Asian	5,815	6.28%	3,680	4.08%	2,745	3.11%
Southeast Asian (Note: Statistic includes total responses of "Filipino" and "Southeast Asian" under visible minority section on census.)	4,055	4.38%	3,560	3.95%	2,620	2.96%
East Asian (Note: Statistic includes total responses of "Chinese", "Korean", and "Japanese" under visible minority section on census.)	3,990	4.31%	3,725	4.13%	3,060	3.46%
African	3,495	3.77%	2,260	2.51%	1,635	1.85%
Middle Eastern (Note: Statistic includes total responses of "West Asian" and "Arab" under visible minority section on census.)	1,605	1.73%	1,185	1.31%	885	1%
Latin American	1,360	1.47%	1,060	1.18%	800	0.91%
Other/multiracial (Note: Statistic includes total responses of "Visible minority, n.i.e." and "Multiple visible minorities" under visible minority section on census.)	1,205	1.3%	920	1.02%	395	0.45%
Total responses	92,605	97.68%	90,190	96.92%	88,370	97.42%
Total population	94,803	100%	93,053	100%	90,711	100%
Notes: Totals greater than 100% due to multiple origin responses. Demographics based on 2012 Canadian federal electoral redistribution riding boundaries.

== History ==
The electoral district was originally created in 1924 from the ridings of Winnipeg South and Winnipeg Centre. Its first iteration was generally located west of the Red River and north of the Assiniboine River. In 1952, it gained parts the Rural Municipality (and later city) of St. James. In 1966, it gained parts the municipalities of Assiniboia, and Charleswood, and the Town of Tuxedo. By this time, the riding had moved further west and crossed the Assiniboine.

In 1976, it was abolished with its territory transferred to the ridings of Winnipeg—Assiniboine and Winnipeg—St. James.

The electoral district was re-created in 1987 from parts of the redrawn ridings of St. Boniface and Winnipeg North Centre, and the abolished Winnipeg—Assiniboine and Winnipeg—Fort Garry. The new riding was almost entirely south of the Assiniboine River, except for Downtown Winnipeg, and had very little territory in common with the original Winnipeg South Centre. The riding contained all of Downtown Winnipeg south of Portage Avenue, plus the neighbourhoods of Alpine Place, Crescentwood, Earl Grey, Winnipeg, Ebby-Wentworth, Elm Park, Glenwood, Grant Park, J. B. Mitchell, Kingston Crescent, Lord Roberts, Mathers, McMillan, the northern half of Norberry, River-Osborne, River Heights, Riverview, Rockwood, Roslyn, St. George, Varennes, Wellington Crescent, and Tuxedo east of Edgeland Blvd.

The district's boundaries were redistributed in 1996. It lost all of its territory east of the Red River to St. Boniface; it lost all of Downtown Winnipeg north of York Avenue and east of Main Street to Winnipeg Centre. It gained Armstrong's Point and West Broadway south of Portage Avenue from Winnipeg North Centre; and it gained the remainder of Tuxedo plus the neighbourhoods of Assiniboine Park, Edgeland, Old Tuxedo, Sir John Franklin, and Vialoux from Winnipeg South.

The 2003 redistribution moved the riding entirely south of the Assiniboine for the first time, losing its territory north of the Assiniboine to Winnipeg Centre. The riding also lost Assiniboine Park and Vialoux to Charleswood—St. James. It gained the neighbourhoods of Beaumont, Buffalo, Chevrier, Crescent Park, Maybank, the western half of Pembina Strip, Point Road, and Wildwood from Winnipeg South.

This riding gained the neighbourhoods of Brockville, Linden Woods, Tuxedo Industrial and the remainder of the Pembina Strip from Winnipeg South during the 2012 electoral redistribution.

Following the report from the 2022 electoral redistribution, the riding is set to lose the Tuxedo area to the new riding of Winnipeg West, while adding Whyte Ridge, Linden Ridge and West Fort Garry Industrial from Winnipeg South.

=== Historical boundaries ===
1924 representation order

1933 representation order

1947 representation order

1952 representation order

1966 representation order

1987 representation order

1996 representation order

=== Members of Parliament ===
This riding has elected the following members of Parliament:

Parliament	Years	Member	Party
Winnipeg South Centre; Riding created from Winnipeg South and Winnipeg Centre
15th	1925–1926	William Walker Kennedy	Conservative
16th	1926–1930	Joseph Thorarinn Thorson	Liberal
17th	1930–1935	William Walker Kennedy	Conservative
18th	1935–1940	Ralph Maybank	Liberal
19th	1940–1945	Ralph Maybank	Liberal
20th	1945–1949	Ralph Maybank	Liberal
21st	1949–1951	Ralph Maybank	Liberal
21st	1951–1953	Gordon Churchill	Progressive Conservative
22nd	1953–1957	Gordon Churchill	Progressive Conservative
23rd	1957–1958	Gordon Churchill	Progressive Conservative
24th	1958–1962	Gordon Churchill	Progressive Conservative
25th	1962–1963	Gordon Churchill	Progressive Conservative
26th	1963–1965	Gordon Churchill	Progressive Conservative
27th	1965–1968	Gordon Churchill	Progressive Conservative
28th	1968–1972	Edmund Boyd Osler	Liberal
29th	1972–1974	A. Daniel McKenzie	Progressive Conservative
30th	1974–1979	A. Daniel McKenzie	Progressive Conservative
Riding dissolved into Winnipeg—Assiniboine and Winnipeg—St. James
Riding re-created from St. Boniface, Winnipeg North Centre, Winnipeg—Assiniboine and Winnipeg—Fort Garry
34th	1988–1993	Lloyd Axworthy	Liberal
35th	1993–1997	Lloyd Axworthy	Liberal
36th	1997–2000	Lloyd Axworthy	Liberal
37th	2000–2004	Anita Neville	Liberal
38th	2004–2006	Anita Neville	Liberal
39th	2006–2008	Anita Neville	Liberal
40th	2008–2011	Anita Neville	Liberal
41st	2011–2015	Joyce Bateman	Conservative
42nd	2015–2019	Jim Carr	Liberal
43rd	2019–2021	Jim Carr	Liberal
44th	2021–2022	Jim Carr	Liberal
44th	2023–2025	Ben Carr	Liberal
45th	2025–present	Ben Carr	Liberal

=== Current member of Parliament ===
Ben Carr has represented Winnipeg South Centre since a by-election in June 2023. He is the son of former MP and federal cabinet minister Jim Carr, who died in office in December 2022.

== Election results ==
=== 1988–present ===
Graph of election results in Winnipeg South Centre (since 1988, minor parties that never got 2% of the vote or didn't run consistently are omitted) View source data.

2025 Canadian federal election
** Preliminary results — Not yet official **
Party	Candidate	Votes	%	±%	Expenditures
Liberal	Ben Carr	33,834	63.62	+18.33	
Conservative	Royden Brousseau	14,748	27.73	–0.39	
New Democratic	Jorge Requena Ramos	3,463	6.51	–14.16	
Green	Chris Petriew	450	0.85	–1.80	
Communist	Cam Scott	314	0.59	+0.11	
People's	Jaclyn Cummings	272	0.51	–2.30	
Independent	Tait Palsson	99	0.19	N/A	
Total valid votes/expense limit					
Total rejected ballots					
Turnout		53,180	74.85		
Eligible voters		71,046			
Liberal notional hold		Swing		+9.36	
Source: Elections Canada
Note: Change in percentage value and swing are calculated from the redistributed results of the 2021 general election, not the June 2023 by-election.

2021 federal election redistributed results
Party	Vote	%
Liberal	22,184	45.29
Conservative	13,773	28.12
New Democratic	10,124	20.67
People's	1,378	2.81
Green	1,300	2.65
Others	226	0.46

Canadian federal by-election, June 19, 2023 Death of Jim Carr
Party	Candidate	Votes	%	±%
Liberal	Ben Carr	14,278	55.49	+9.94
Conservative	Damir Stipanovic	6,100	23.70	-4.11
New Democratic	Julia Riddell	3,778	14.68	-5.95
Green	Doug Hemmerling	698	2.71	-0.04
People's	Tylor Baer	324	1.26	-1.51
Rhinoceros	Sébastien CoRhino	55	0.21	
Independent	Tait Palsson	52	0.20	
Independent	Jevin David Carroll	36	0.14	
Independent	John Dale	29	0.11	
Independent	Glen MacDonald	27	0.10	
Independent	Connie Lukawski	24	0.09	
Independent	Paul Stewart	22	0.09	
Independent	Patrick Strzalkowski	19	0.07	
Independent	Mark Dejewski	18	0.07	
Independent	Stella Galas	16	0.06	
Independent	Demetrios Karavas	16	0.06	
Independent	Myriam Beaulieu	14	0.05	
Independent	Christopher Clacio	14	0.05	
Independent	Alain Bourgault	13	0.05	
Independent	Martin "Acetaria Caesar" Jubinville	13	0.05	
Independent	Krzysztof Krzywinski	13	0.05	
Independent	Alain Lamontagne	11	0.04	
Independent	Marie-Hélène LeBel	11	0.04	
Independent	Jordan Wong	11	0.04	
Independent	Line Bélanger	10	0.04	
Independent	Andrew Kozakewich	10	0.04	
Independent	Eliana Rosenblum	10	0.04	
Independent	Gerrit Dogger	9	0.03	
Independent	Julie St-Amand	9	0.03	
Independent	Alexandra Engering	8	0.03	
Independent	Anthony Hamel	8	0.03	
Independent	Darcy Justin Vanderwater	8	0.03	
Independent	Roger Sherwood	7	0.03	
Independent	Pascal St-Amand	7	0.03	
Independent	Dji-Pé Frazer	6	0.02	
Independent	Daniel Gagnon	6	0.02	
Independent	Spencer Rocchi	6	0.02	
Independent	Mário Stocco	6	0.02	
Independent	Manon Marie Lili Desbiens	5	0.02	
Independent	Ysack Émile Dupont	5	0.02	
Independent	Yusuf Nasihi	5	0.02	
Independent	Jaël Champagne Gareau	4	0.02	
Independent	Donovan Eckstrom	3	0.01	
Independent	Ryan Huard	2	0.01	
Independent	Lorant Polya	2	0.01	
Independent	Benjamin Teichman	2	0.01	
Independent	Gavin Vanderwater	2	0.01	
Independent	Saleh Waziruddin	1	0.00	
Total valid votes		25,733	99.52	
Total rejected ballots		125	0.48	-0.26
Turnout		25,858	36.82	-32.79
Eligible voters		70,230		
Liberal hold		Swing		+7.02
Source: Elections Canada

2021 Canadian federal election
Party	Candidate	Votes	%	±%	Expenditures
Liberal	Jim Carr	22,214	45.55	+0.54	$84,273.45
Conservative	Joyce Bateman	13,566	27.82	−1.89	$83,919.18
New Democratic	Julia Riddell	10,064	20.64	+2.94	$12,522.59
People's	Chase Wells	1,352	2.77	+1.65	$1,885.74
Green	Douglas Hemmerling	1,341	2.75	−3.51	$21,799.84
Communist	Cam Scott	234	0.48	N/A	N/A
Total valid votes/expense limit		48,771	99.26		$106,382.19
Total rejected ballots		364	0.74	+0.22	
Turnout		49,135	69.60	-1.37	
Eligible voters		70,592			
Liberal hold		Swing		+1.22	
Source: Elections Canada

2019 Canadian federal election
Party	Candidate	Votes	%	±%	Expenditures
Liberal	Jim Carr	22,799	45.00	−14.72	$83,512.07
Conservative	Joyce Bateman	15,051	29.71	+1.52	$37,521.63
New Democratic	Elizabeth Shearer	8,965	17.70	+8.74	$8,170.86
Green	James Beddome	3,173	6.26	+3.13	$3,211.69
People's	Jane MacDiarmid	569	1.12	–	$7,017.57
Christian Heritage	Linda Marynuk	104	0.21	–	none listed
Total valid votes/expense limit		50,661	99.48		
Total rejected ballots		267	0.52	+0.17	
Turnout		50,928	70.97	-5.30	
Eligible voters		71,760			
Liberal hold		Swing		−8.12	
Source: Elections Canada

2015 Canadian federal election
Party	Candidate	Votes	%	±%	Expenditures
Liberal	Jim Carr	31,993	59.72	+23.13	$138,860.30
Conservative	Joyce Bateman	15,102	28.19	−12.96	$92,738.43
New Democratic	Matt Henderson	4,799	8.96	−9.39	$29,074.48
Green	Andrew Park	1,677	3.13	−0.09	$26,901.85
Total valid votes/expense limit		53,571	99.65		$203,341.22
Total rejected ballots		188	0.35	–	
Turnout		53,759	76.27	–	
Eligible voters		70,487			
Liberal gain from Conservative		Swing		+18.05	
Source: Elections Canada

2011 federal election redistributed results
Party	Vote	%
Conservative	19,185	41.15
Liberal	17,057	36.59
New Democratic	8,554	18.35
Green	1,502	3.22
Others	321	0.69

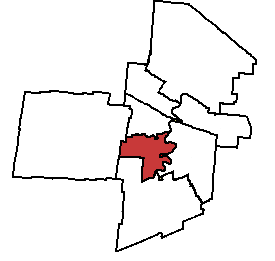
Map of the riding from 2004 to 2011

2011 Canadian federal election
Party	Candidate	Votes	%	±%	Expenditures
Conservative	Joyce Bateman	15,506	38.82	+2.56	$72,590.37
Liberal	Anita Neville	14,784	37.02	−5.25	$79,128.33
New Democratic	Dennis Lewycky	7,945	19.89	+5.78	$15,656.19
Green	Joshua McNeil	1,383	3.46	−3.89	$1,586.80
Independent	Matt Henderson	218	0.55	–	$129.79
Independent	Lyndon B. Froese	103	0.26	–	$0.00
Total valid votes/expense limit		39,939	99.62		–
Total rejected ballots		154	0.38	−0.00	
Turnout		40,093	69.04	+3.36	
Eligible voters		58,075	–	–	
Conservative gain from Liberal		Swing		+3.91	

2008 Canadian federal election
Party	Candidate	Votes	%	±%	Expenditures
Liberal	Anita Neville	16,438	42.27	+3.02	$74,911
Conservative	Trevor Kennerd	14,103	36.26	+4.77	$74,675
New Democratic	Rachel Heinrichs	5,490	14.12	−7.69	$10,465
Green	Vere Scott	2,860	7.35	+2.90	$1,774
Total valid votes/expense limit		38,891	99.61		$77,552
Total rejected ballots		151	0.39	+0.03	
Turnout		39,042	65.68	-3.81	
Eligible voters		59,444	–	–	
Liberal hold		Swing		-0.87	

2006 Canadian federal election
Party	Candidate	Votes	%	±%	Expenditures
Liberal	Anita Neville	16,296	39.25	−7.35	$71,377
Conservative	Michael Richards	13,077	31.49	+4.47	$72,385
New Democratic	Mark Wasyliw	9,055	21.81	+0.56	$19,492
Green	Vere H. Scott	1,848	4.45	+0.58	$1,237
Progressive Canadian	Dale Swirsky	934	2.25	–	$11,137
Independent	Jeffrey Anderson	246	0.59	–	$3,204
Canadian Action	Magnus Thompson	66	0.16	−0.13	$2,750
Total valid votes		41,522	99.64		–
Total rejected ballots		150	0.36	+0.00	
Turnout		41,672	69.49	+6.85	
Eligible voters		59,971	–	–	
Liberal hold		Swing		-5.91	

2004 Canadian federal election
Party	Candidate	Votes	%	±%	Expenditures
Liberal	Anita Neville	18,133	46.60	+4.64	$70,382
Conservative	Raj Joshi	10,516	27.02	-10.49	$62,453
New Democratic	James Allum	8,270	21.25	+2.94	$29,392
Green	Ian Scott	1,508	3.88	–	$1,030
Marijuana	Andy Caisse	293	0.75	–	–
Canadian Action	Magnus Thompson	114	0.29	–	$1,617
Communist	Andrew Dalgliesh	81	0.21	–	$654
Total valid votes		38,915	99.64		–
Total rejected ballots		139	0.36	–	
Turnout		39,054	62.64		
Eligible voters		62,346	–	–	
Liberal hold		Swing		+7.57	

Note: Change is based on redistributed results. Conservative vote is compared to the total of the Canadian Alliance vote and Progressive Conservative vote in 2000 election.

2000 federal election redistributed results
Party	Vote	%
Liberal	15,992	41.96
Progressive Conservative	10,100	26.50
New Democratic	6,981	18.32
Canadian Alliance	4,200	11.02
Others	843	2.21

Map of the riding from 1997 to 2000

2000 Canadian federal election
Party	Candidate	Votes	%	±%
Liberal	Anita Neville	15,231	40.46	−15.42
Progressive Conservative	David Newman	10,675	28.36	+14.36
New Democratic	James Allum	7,501	19.93	+3.96
Alliance	Betty Granger	3,210	8.53	−3.92
Marijuana	Chris Buors	640	1.70	
Canadian Action	Magnus Thompson	202	0.54	
Communist	David Allison	181	0.48	
Total valid votes		37,640	99.52	
Total rejected ballots		181	0.48	-0.35
Turnout		37,821	62.54	-2.38
Eligible voters		60,471	–	–
Liberal hold		Swing		-14.89

Note: Canadian Alliance vote is compared to the Reform vote in 1997 election.

1997 Canadian federal election
Party	Candidate	Votes	%	±%
Liberal	Lloyd Axworthy	20,006	55.89	−5.55
New Democratic	Sara Malabar	5,717	15.97	+7.63
Progressive Conservative	Andrea Rolstone	5,011	14.00	+4.73
Reform	Gary Hollingshead	4,457	12.45	−0.10
Natural Law	Ron Decter	224	0.63	+0.09
Independent	Jim Blomquist	202	0.56	
Marxist–Leninist	Karen Naylor	180	0.50	+0.32
Total valid votes		35,797	99.17	
Total rejected ballots		299	0.83	
Turnout		36,096	64.92	
Eligible voters		55,600	–	–
Liberal hold		Swing		-6.59

Map of the riding from 1987 to 1993

1993 Canadian federal election
Party	Candidate	Votes	%	±%
Liberal	Lloyd Axworthy	25,881	61.44	+3.01
Reform	Vern A. Hannah	5,288	12.55	+10.82
Progressive Conservative	Mike Radcliffe	3,903	9.26	−19.64
New Democratic	Lloyd Penner	3,512	8.34	−2.01
National	Bill Loewen	3,099	7.36	
Natural Law	Elizabeth Innes	225	0.53	
Libertarian	Clancy Smith	89	0.21	−0.13
Independent	Karen Naylor	76	0.18	
Canada Party	Ben J. Fulawka	54	0.13	
Total valid votes		42,127	100.0	
Liberal hold		Swing		-3.90

1988 Canadian federal election
Party	Candidate	Votes	%
Liberal	Lloyd Axworthy	26,191	58.42
Progressive Conservative	Garth Dawley	12,960	28.91
New Democratic	Les Campbell	4,637	10.34
Reform	Ross Malabar	777	1.73
Libertarian	Clancy Smith	154	0.34
Independent	Ken Kalturnyk	111	0.25
Total valid votes		44,830	100.0

=== 1925–1979 ===
Graph of election results in Winnipeg South Centre (1925–1974, minor parties that never got 2% of the vote or didn't run consistently are omitted) View source data.

1974 Canadian federal election
Party	Candidate	Votes	%	±%
Progressive Conservative	Dan McKenzie	32,277	57.1	+11.9
Liberal	Doug McEwen	15,956	28.2	−8.1
New Democratic	Andy Robertson	7,823	13.8	−4.7
Social Credit	Monty A. McDonald	365	0.6	
Marxist–Leninist	Marnie Frain	102	0.2	
Total valid votes		56,523	100.0	

1972 Canadian federal election
Party	Candidate	Votes	%	±%
Progressive Conservative	Dan McKenzie	25,550	45.2	+16.3
Liberal	E. B. Osler	20,516	36.3	−15.5
New Democratic	Harvey H. Moats	10,460	18.5	+0.6
Total valid votes		56,526	100.0	

1968 Canadian federal election
Party	Candidate	Votes	%	±%
Liberal	E. B. Osler	23,775	51.8	+15.5
Progressive Conservative	Duff Roblin	13,268	28.9	−12.9
New Democratic	Frances Thompson	8,240	17.9	−1.8
Independent Conservative	John McDowell	632	1.4	
Total valid votes		45,915	100.0	

1965 Canadian federal election
Party	Candidate	Votes	%	±%
Progressive Conservative	Gordon Churchill	15,296	41.8	−0.7
Liberal	Fred Douglas	13,262	36.3	−3.2
New Democratic	Philip Petursson	7,234	19.8	+4.8
Social Credit	Walter Hatch	764	2.1	−0.9
Total valid votes		36,556	100.0	

1963 Canadian federal election
Party	Candidate	Votes	%	±%
Progressive Conservative	Gordon Churchill	17,092	42.6	−0.4
Liberal	Fred Douglas	15,849	39.5	+2.3
New Democratic	Alistair Stewart	6,011	15.0	−1.5
Social Credit	Harold Bathgate	1,182	2.9	−0.4
Total valid votes		40,134	100.0	

1962 Canadian federal election
Party	Candidate	Votes	%	±%
Progressive Conservative	Gordon Churchill	16,547	43.0	−23.6
Liberal	Ed Russenholt	14,306	37.2	+18.1
New Democratic	A.N. Robertson	6,357	16.5	+2.2
Social Credit	Asta Oddson	1,298	3.4	
Total valid votes		38,508	100.0	

Note: NDP vote is compared to CCF vote in 1958 election.

1958 Canadian federal election
Party	Candidate	Votes	%	±%
Progressive Conservative	Gordon Churchill	27,722	66.6	+16.5
Liberal	Ronald Gillies	7,927	19.0	–6.2
Co-operative Commonwealth	Gordon Fines	5,975	14.4	–3.5
Total valid votes		41,624	100.0	

1957 Canadian federal election
Party	Candidate	Votes	%	±%
Progressive Conservative	Gordon Churchill	19,022	50.1	
Liberal	Roy Richardson	9,592	25.3	
Co-operative Commonwealth	A. H. Mackling	6,778	17.9	
Social Credit	Asa Caswell	2,561	6.7	
Total valid votes		37,953	100.0	

1953 Canadian federal election
Party	Candidate	Votes	%	±%
Progressive Conservative	Gordon Churchill	12,489	42.7	−0.9
Liberal	A.W. Hanks	9,752	33.3	−4.9
Co-operative Commonwealth	Gordon R. Fines	6,506	22.2	+4.1
Labor–Progressive	Roland Penner	504	1.7	
Total valid votes		29,251	100.0	

Canadian federal by-election, 25 June 1951
Party	Candidate	Votes	%	±%
On Mr. Maybank's resignation, 30 April 1951
Progressive Conservative	Gordon Churchill	6,009	43.6	+19.2
Liberal	Norman Wright	5,273	38.3	−16.4
Co-operative Commonwealth	Charles Biesick	2,497	18.1	−2.8
Total valid votes		13,779	100.0	

1949 Canadian federal election
Party	Candidate	Votes	%	±%
Liberal	Ralph Maybank	14,747	54.7	+10.7
Progressive Conservative	Gordon Minto Churchill	6,593	24.4	+1.7
Co-operative Commonwealth	Andrew N. Robertson	5,632	20.9	−12.4
Total valid votes		26,972	100.0	

1945 Canadian federal election
Party	Candidate	Votes	%	±%
Liberal	Ralph Maybank	16,389	44.0	−10.5
Co-operative Commonwealth	Lloyd Cleworth Stinson	12,393	33.3	+17.7
Progressive Conservative	Frank Edward Womersley	8,461	22.7	−7.2
Total valid votes		37,243	100.0	

Note: Progressive Conservative vote is compared to "National Government" vote in 1940 election.

1940 Canadian federal election
Party	Candidate	Votes	%	±%
Liberal	Ralph Maybank	19,486	54.5	+18.1
National Government	William Walker Kennedy	10,698	29.9	−0.4
Co-operative Commonwealth	John Julius Swanson	5,576	15.6	−5.6
Total valid votes		35,760	100.0	

Note: "National Government" vote is compared to Conservative vote in 1935 election.

1935 Canadian federal election
Party	Candidate	Votes	%	±%
Liberal	Ralph Maybank	11,264	36.4	−7.6
Conservative	William Walker Kennedy	9,382	30.3	−25.7
Co-operative Commonwealth	Stanley Knowles	6,573	21.2	
Reconstruction	Alfred James Susans	2,642	8.5	
Social Credit	Arthur Brown	1,114	3.6	
Total valid votes		30,975	100.0	

1930 Canadian federal election
Party	Candidate	Votes	%	±%
Conservative	William Walker Kennedy	17,355	56.0	+7.2
Liberal	Joseph Thorarinn Thorson	13,637	44.0	−7.2
Total valid votes		30,992	100.0	
Source: lop.parl.ca

1926 Canadian federal election
Party	Candidate	Votes	%	±%
Liberal	Joseph Thorarinn Thorson	12,315	51.2	+20.0
Conservative	William Walker Kennedy	11,737	48.8	−4.1
Total valid votes		24,052	100.0	

1925 Canadian federal election
Party	Candidate	Votes	%
Conservative	William Walker Kennedy	12,094	52.9
Liberal	Joseph Fergus Davidson	7,132	31.2
Labour	Alexander Henry	3,643	15.9
Total valid votes		22,869	100.0

== Student vote results ==
2019 Canadian federal election
Party	Candidate	Votes	%	±%
Liberal	Jim Carr	937	27.01	−26.05
New Democratic	Elizabeth Shearer	934	26.92	+12.34
Conservative	Joyce Bateman	765	22.05	−0.08
Green	James Beddome	598	17.24	+7.01
People's	Jane MacDiarmid	150	4.32	–
Christian Heritage	Linda Marynuk	85	2.45	–
Liberal hold		Swing		−26.05
Source: Student Votes Canada

2015 Canadian federal election
Party	Candidate	Votes	%	±%
Liberal	Jim Carr	2,199	53.06	+25.56
Conservative	Joyce Bateman	917	22.13	−3.77
New Democratic	Matt Henderson	604	14.58	−9.92
Green	Andrew Park	424	10.23	−4.07
Liberal hold		Swing		+25.56
Source: Student Votes Canada

2011 Canadian federal election
Party	Candidate	Votes	%
Liberal	Anita Neville	426	27.5
Conservative	Joyce Bateman	402	25.9
New Democratic	Dennis Lewycky	380	24.5
Green	Joshua McNeil	222	14.3
Independent	Matt Henderson	95	6.12
Independent	Lyndon B. Froese	26	1.67
Source: Student Votes Canada

== See also ==
- List of Canadian electoral districts
- Historical federal electoral districts of Canada
