= Edmund Boyd Osler (Manitoba politician) =

Canadian politician (1919–1987)

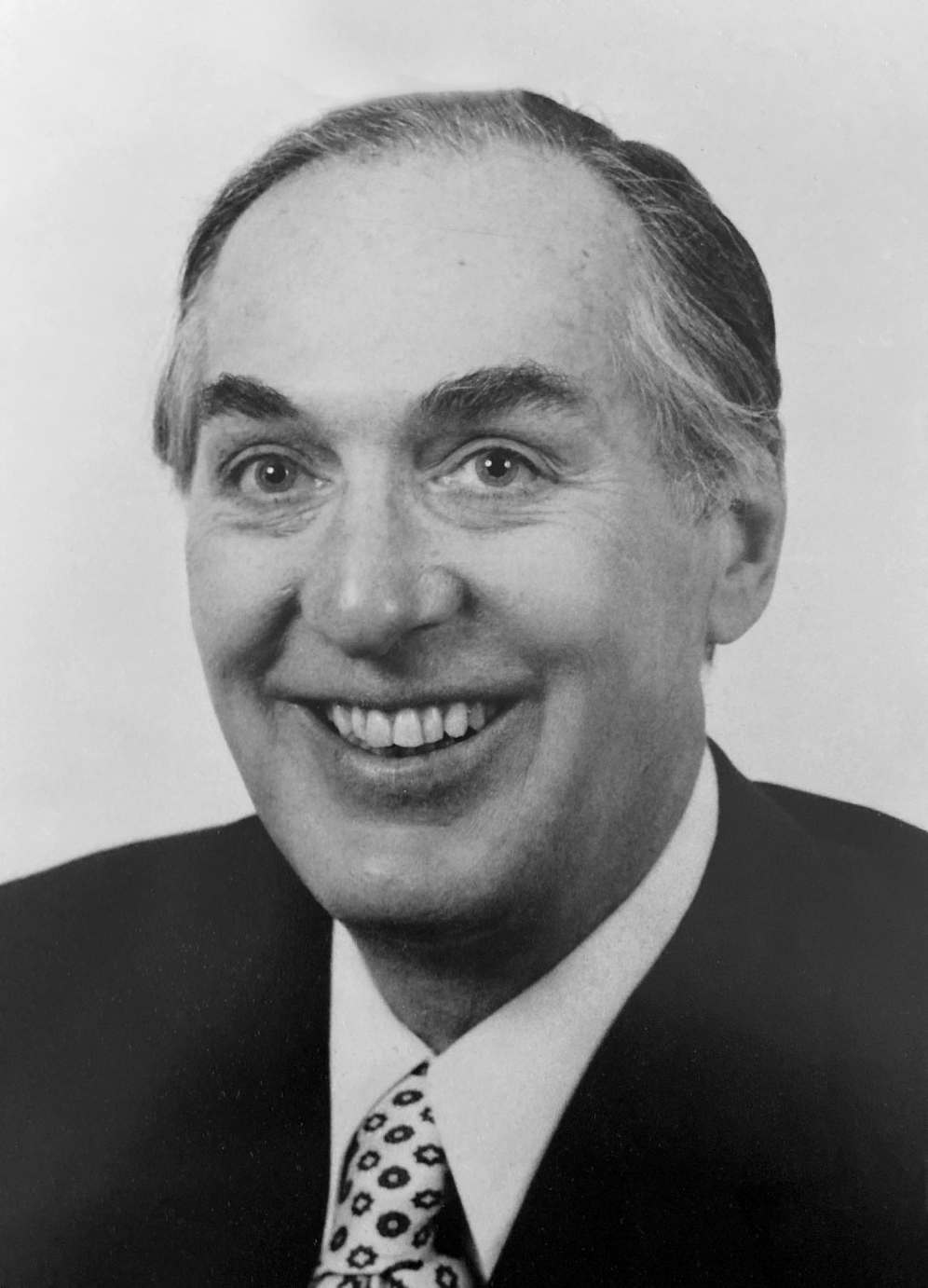

Member of Parliament for Winnipeg South Centre
- In office June 1968 – September 1972
- Preceded by: Gordon Churchill
- Succeeded by: A. Daniel McKenzie

Personal details
- Born: 21 August 1919 Winnipeg, Manitoba, Canada
- Died: 1 April 1987 (aged 67) Winnipeg, Manitoba, Canada
- Party: Liberal
- Profession: Politician; pilot; insurance executive; author

Edmund Boyd Osler (21 August 1919 – 1 April 1987) was a Canadian politician and Liberal Member of Parliament (MP) who represented the riding of Winnipeg South Centre in the House of Commons of Canada.

== Biography ==
He was born in Winnipeg on 21 August 1919, in Winnipeg, and was the grandson of his namesake Edmund Boyd Osler. He graduated from the Royal Military College of Canada in Kingston, Ontario in 1937. He also studied at War Staff College, Royal Canadian Air Force. He served as a Royal Canadian Air Force sergeant pilot and was promoted to squadron leader from 1940 to 1945. Upon retirement, he worked as an insurance executive and writer. He died in Winnipeg, on 1 April 1987, aged 67.

Osler was first elected in the 1968 general election at the Winnipeg South Centre riding and served one term, the 28th Canadian Parliament. Osler left Parliament after his defeat in the 1972 election to A. Daniel McKenzie of the Progressive Conservative party.

E. B. Osler was the author of A Light in the Wilderness (1953) and The Man Who had to Hang Louis Riel (1961) and La Salle (1967).

== Electoral history ==
1972 Canadian federal election: Winnipeg South Centre
| Party | Candidate | Votes | % | ±% |
|---|---|---|---|---|
| Progressive Conservative | Dan McKenzie | 25,550 | 45.2 | +16.3 |
| Liberal | E. B. Osler | 20,516 | 36.3 | −15.5 |
| New Democratic | Harvey H. Moats | 10,460 | 18.5 | +0.6 |
| Total valid votes | | 56,526 | 100.0 | |

1968 Canadian federal election: Winnipeg South Centre
| Party | Candidate | Votes | % | ±% |
|---|---|---|---|---|
| Liberal | E. B. Osler | 23,775 | 51.8 | +15.5 |
| Progressive Conservative | Duff Roblin | 13,268 | 28.9 | −12.9 |
| New Democratic | Frances Thompson | 8,240 | 17.9 | −1.8 |
| Independent Conservative | John McDowell | 632 | 1.4 | |
| Total valid votes | | 45,915 | 100.0 | |
