= Elgin Regiment =

The Elgin Regiment; The Elgin Regiment (RCAC)
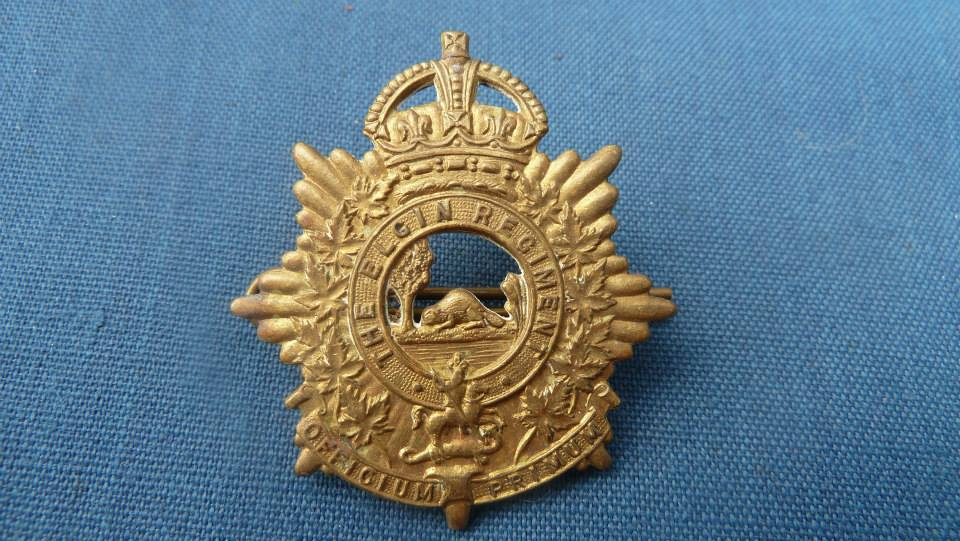
- Regimental cap badge
- Active: 1866–1997
- Country: Canada
- Branch: Canadian Militia (1866–1940); Canadian Army (1940–1997)
- Type: Line Infantry
- Role: Infantry (1866–1942, 1946–1954); Armoured (1942–1946, 1954–1997)
- Part of: Non-Permanent Active Militia (1866–1940); Royal Canadian Infantry Corps (1946–1954); Royal Canadian Armoured Corps (1942–1946, 1954–1997)
- Garrison/HQ: St. Thomas, Ontario
- Motto(s): Officium primum (Latin for 'duty first')
- March: Quick March: “I'm Ninety-Five”; Slow March: “Waltzing Matilda”; Pipes: "Bonnie Dundee"
- Engagements: First World War; Second World War
- Battle honours: See #Battle Honours

The Elgin Regiment (RCAC) (previously known as The Elgin Regiment until 1954) was an armoured regiment of the Canadian Army Reserve.

It was first raised in the 1860s as an infantry regiment, and contributed heavily to the 91st Battalion (Elgin), CEF.

The regiment mobilized the Elgin Regiment, Canadian Active Service Force (CASF) on 24 May 1940. The CASF regiment was converted to armour and redesignated the 25th Armoured Regiment (The Elgin Regiment), Canadian Armoured Corps on 26 January 1942. The regiment again became an armoured unit during the Cold War.

In 1997, the regiment was converted from armour to combat engineers as the 31 Combat Engineer Regiment (The Elgins).

== Lineage as RCAC regiment ==
- Originated on 14 September 1866, in St. Thomas, Canada West, as the 25th Elgin Battalion of Infantry.
- Redesignated on 8 May 1900, as the 25th Elgin Regiment.
- Redesignated on 17 May 1904, as the 25th Regiment.
- Redesignated on 29 March 1920, as The Elgin Regiment.
- Redesignated on 7 November 1940, as The Elgin Regiment (Reserve).
- Redesignated on 15 February 1946, as The Elgin Regiment, RCIC.
- Converted to armour on 1 October 1954, and redesignated as The Elgin Regiment (27th Armoured Regiment).
- Redesignated on 19 May 1958, as The Elgin Regiment (RCAC).
- Converted to engineers on 14 August 1997, and redesignated as the 31 Combat Engineer Regiment (The Elgin's).

== Organization ==
=== 25th Elgin Battalion of Infantry (14 September 1866) ===
- No. 1 Company (St. Thomas) (first raised on 17 July 1856 as The 1st Volunteer Militia Rifle Company of St. Thomas)
- No. 2 Company (Port Stanley) (first raised on 31 January 1862 as the Port Stanley Volunteer Marine Company)
- No. 3 Company (Vienna) (first raised on 29 October 1862 as the Vienna Volunteer Militia Company of Infantry)
- No. 4 Company (Tillsonburg) (first raised on 13 July 1866 as the Tillsonburg Infantry Company)
- No. 5 Company (Aylmer) (first raised on 8 June 1866 as the Aylmer Infantry Company)

=== The Elgin Regiment (15 February 1921) ===
- 1st Battalion (perpetuating the 91st Battalion, CEF)
  - A Company (St. Thomas)
  - B Company (St. Thomas)
  - C Company (St. Thomas)
  - D Company (Aylmer)
- 2nd (Reserve) Battalion

=== 25th Armoured Delivery Regiment (The Elgin Regiment) (1943-1945) ===
- A Squadron (1st Canadian Armoured Brigade)
- B Squadron (1st Canadian Armoured Brigade)
- C Squadron (2nd Canadian Armoured Brigade)
- D Squadron (4th Canadian Armoured Division)
- E Squadron (II Canadian Corps)
- F Squadron (First Canadian Army)
- G Squadron (5th Canadian Armoured Division)
- H Squadron (I Canadian Corps)

== Alliances ==
- The Royal Northumberland Fusiliers (Until 1968)
- The Royal Regiment of Fusiliers (1968-1997)

== Battle honours ==
=== Great War ===
- Somme, 1916
- Arras, 1917
- Ypres, 1917
- Amiens

=== Second World War ===
- Sicily, 1943
- Italy, 1943–1945
- North-West Europe, 1944–1945
