= List of reportedly haunted locations in Canada =

This is a list of locations in Canada which are reported to be haunted. Many have been featured by television programs such as Creepy Canada, Knock Knock Ghost, The Girly Ghosthunters and Mystery Hunters. It is in alphabetical order by province or territory, then by the name of the location.

== Alberta ==
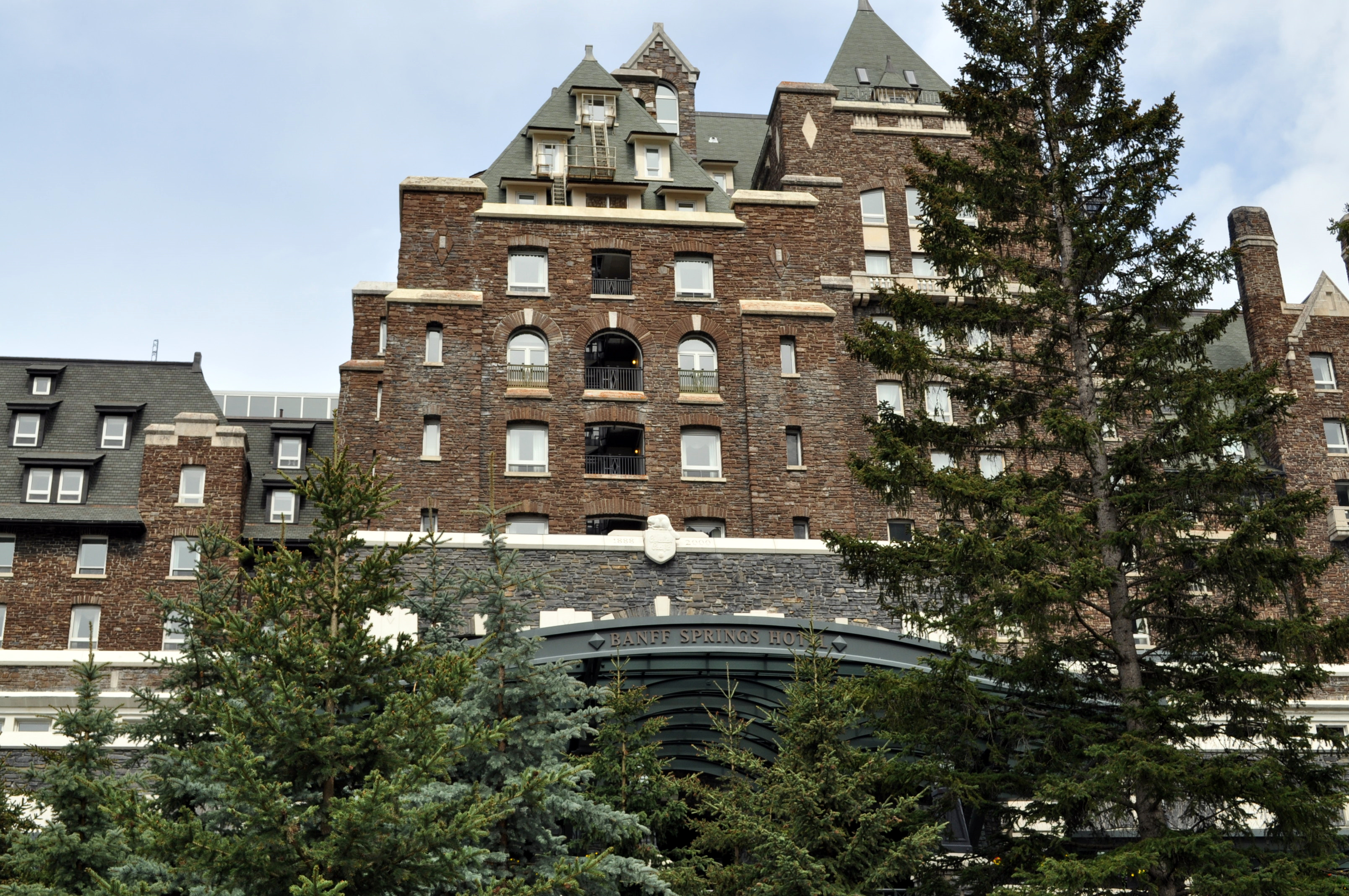
Banff Springs Hotel

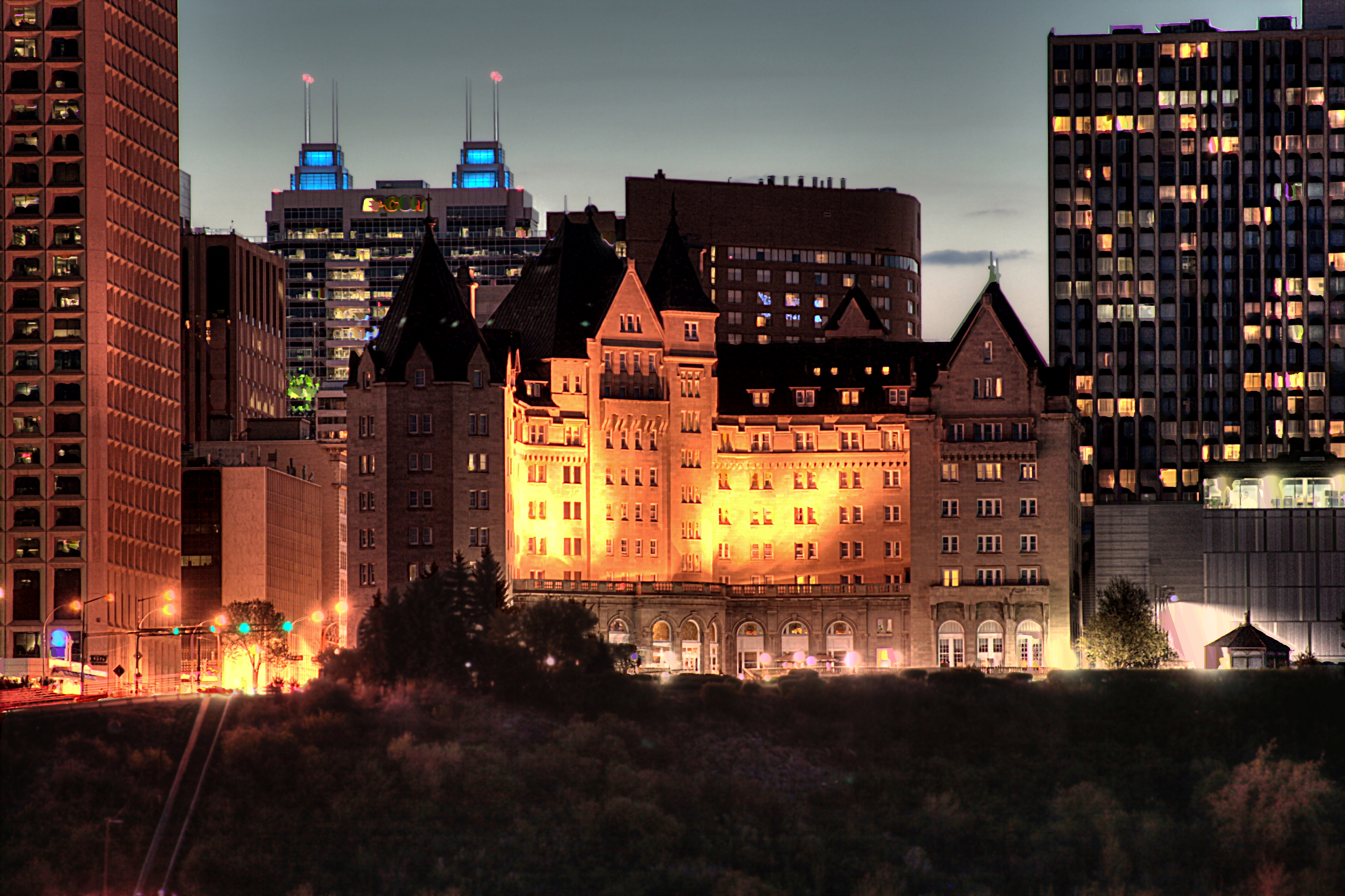
Hotel Macdonald

- Banff Springs Hotel in Banff National Park is a reported location of multiple hauntings, including the ghosts of a young bride, bellman and a Haunted room no.873 (now sealed and combined with room no.875, but underlines of the door and lights above the door place remain visible and a ghost still supposedly haunts the room).
- The Bowman Arts Centre in Lethbridge is reported to be haunted by the ghost of a young Chinese girl who was beaten to death in the women's restroom after being mistaken for a boy in traditional Chinese attire.
- The now-decommissioned Charles Camsell Hospital is regarded as one of Alberta's most haunted buildings. A former Jesuit College turned into a tuberculosis sanatorium, it was visited by the group Paranormal Explorers in 2005.
- Deane House in Calgary is reportedly haunted. It was built in 1906, and served as the official residence of Richard Burton Deane, the Superintendent of the Royal North West Mounted Police. It was featured on Creepy Canada.
- Dunvegan Provincial Park in Fairview. Hauntings include a woman who perished in a snowstorm while searching for her husband, a priest sitting at his desk in the rectory and a barefoot woman dressed in a long white cloak wandering around the bridge.
- The Edmonton General Continuing Care Centre is a palliative care centre that is speculated to be a site of multiple hauntings.
- The Fairmont Hotel Macdonald in Edmonton is reported to be haunted, including a spectral horse that dropped dead during the 1914 pouring of the building's foundation.
- The Firkins House of Fort Edmonton Park is considered to be the home of a ventriloquist doll that suddenly materializes in cupboards, as well as a spectral small boy. It was featured on Creepy Canada.

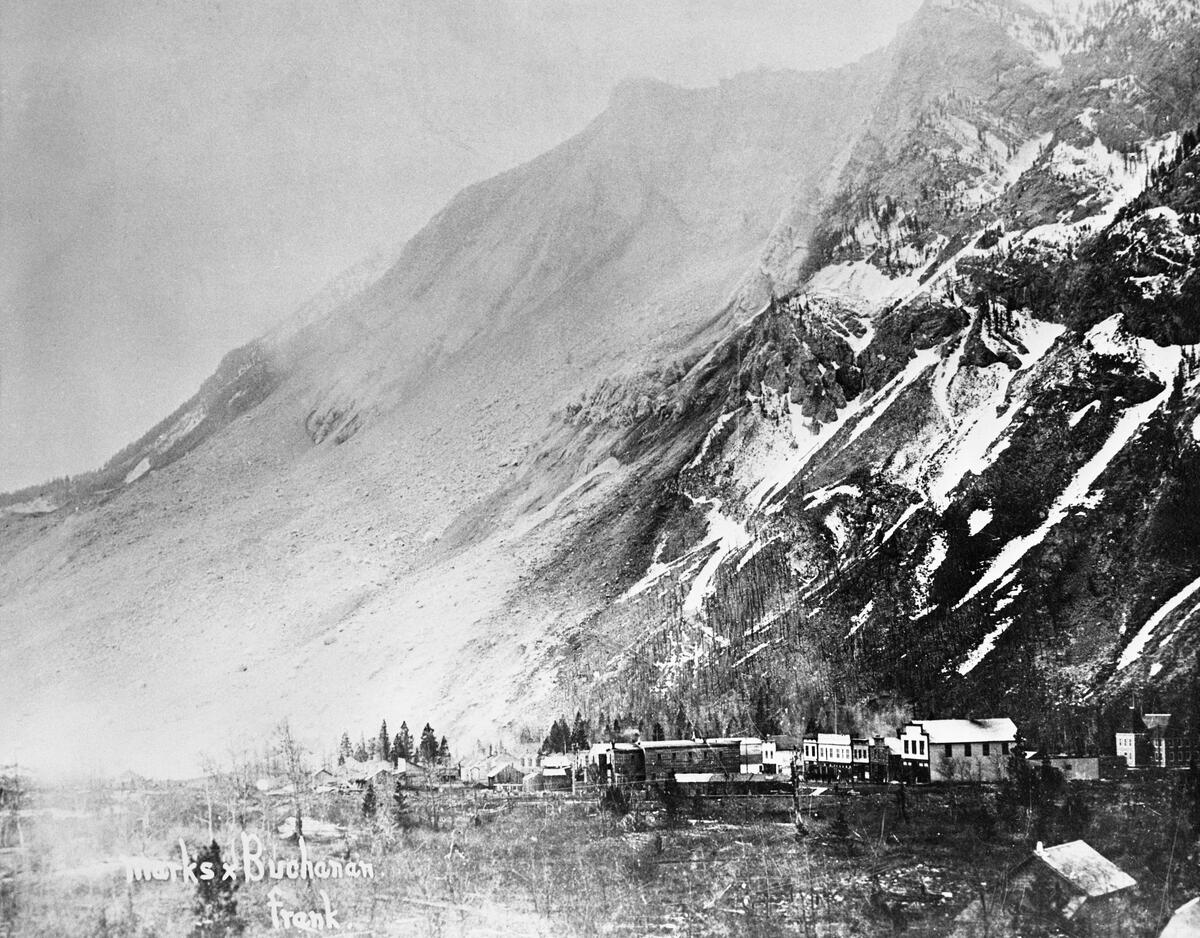
Frank Slide area when it occurred in 1903

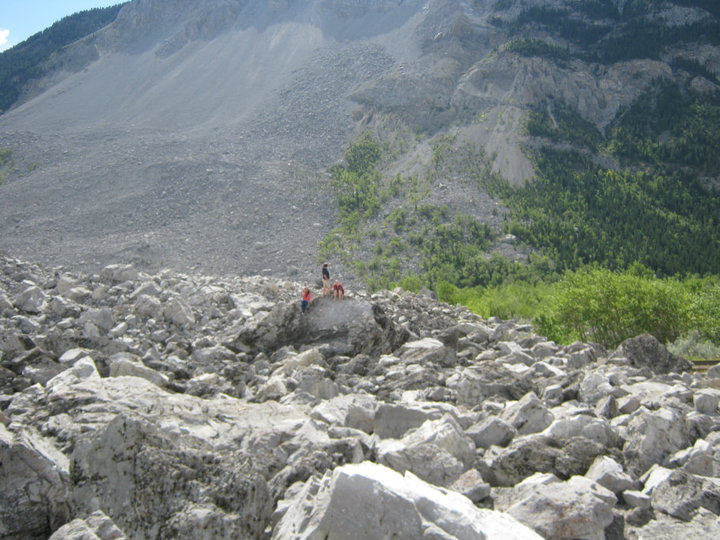
Lower reaches of the Frank Slide in 2012

- Frank Slide in Crowsnest Pass was the site of a massive rockslide in 1903 that claimed 76 lives. Several of their bodies were never recovered.
- The old Grace Hospital in Calgary is reportedly haunted by the ghost of a woman named Maudine Riley, who died in childbirth, and whose family was believed to own the land when the hospital was being constructed. The hospital is still in operation.
- La Bohème Restaurant Bed and Breakfast in Edmonton. According to some employees, it is haunted by the spirit of a former owner's wife who was murdered in a jealous rage.
- McKay Avenue School in downtown Edmonton is a museum that previously served as a school. It was the scene of the first two legislative sessions of the province. One particular entity is the spirit of a worker who perished in a fall during the construction of the building.
- Mystic Manor in High River. Built in 1905, this Queen Anne style mansion appeared as Lana Lang's house in the 1983 movie Superman III. Now it has been converted into an immersive paranormal experience. Tours of the house are led by a psychic medium and utilize state-of-the-art ghost hunting tech, and it is said to have once been one of High River’s first hospitals. Later, it became a morgue before continuing on to being a house.
- The old Princess Theatre in Edmonton is claimed to be haunted by a spectral bride who committed suicide by hanging in the 1920s after being cast off by her loved one.
- Strathcona Museum and Archives is a former RCMP detachment that is considered to be haunted.
- The abandoned Taber Hospital in Taber.
- Walterdale Playhouse in the district of Old Strathcona, Edmonton is reportedly haunted, most notably by the ghost of "Walt," who was an old volunteer firefighter.

== British Columbia ==
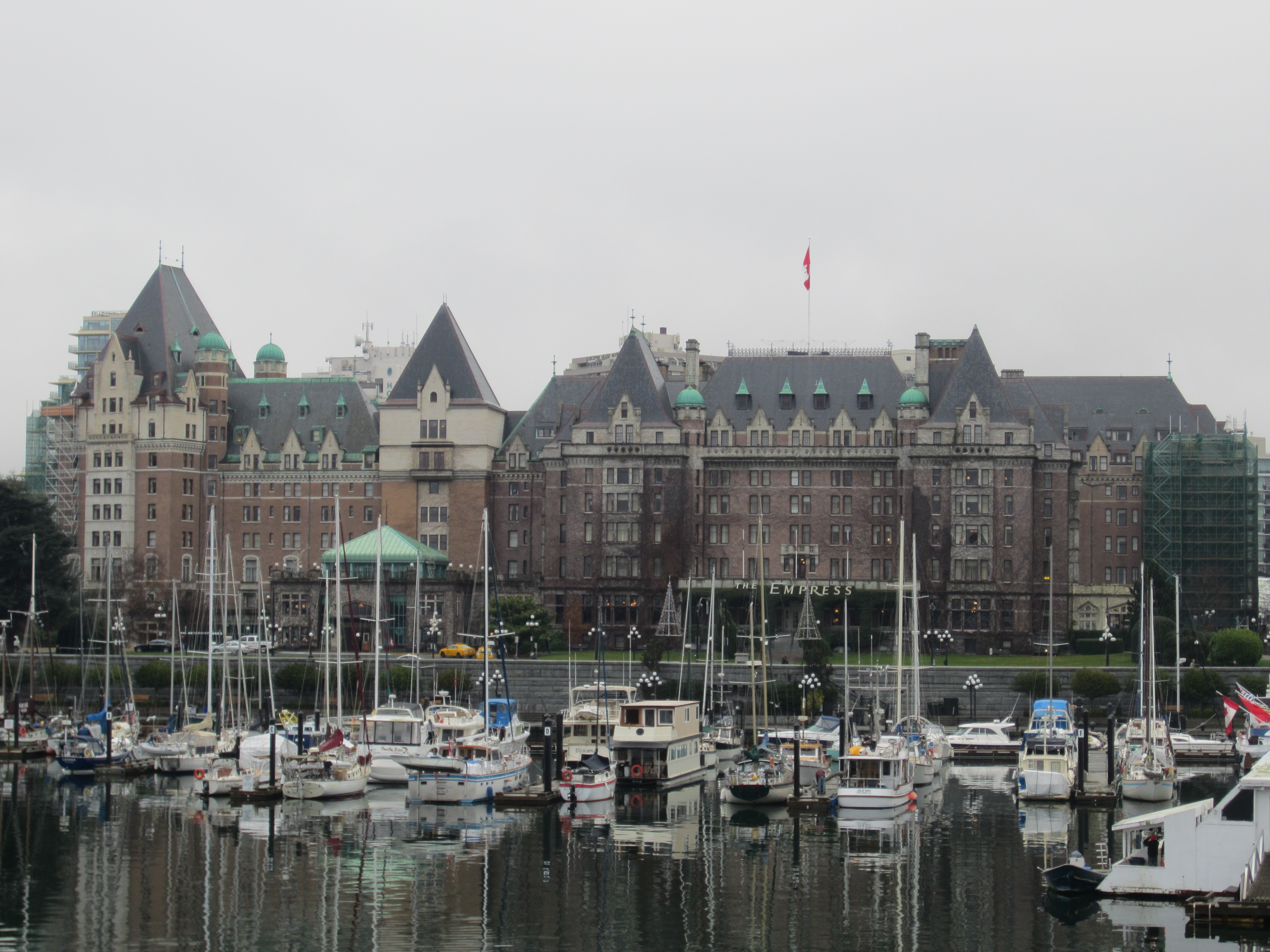
Empress Hotel

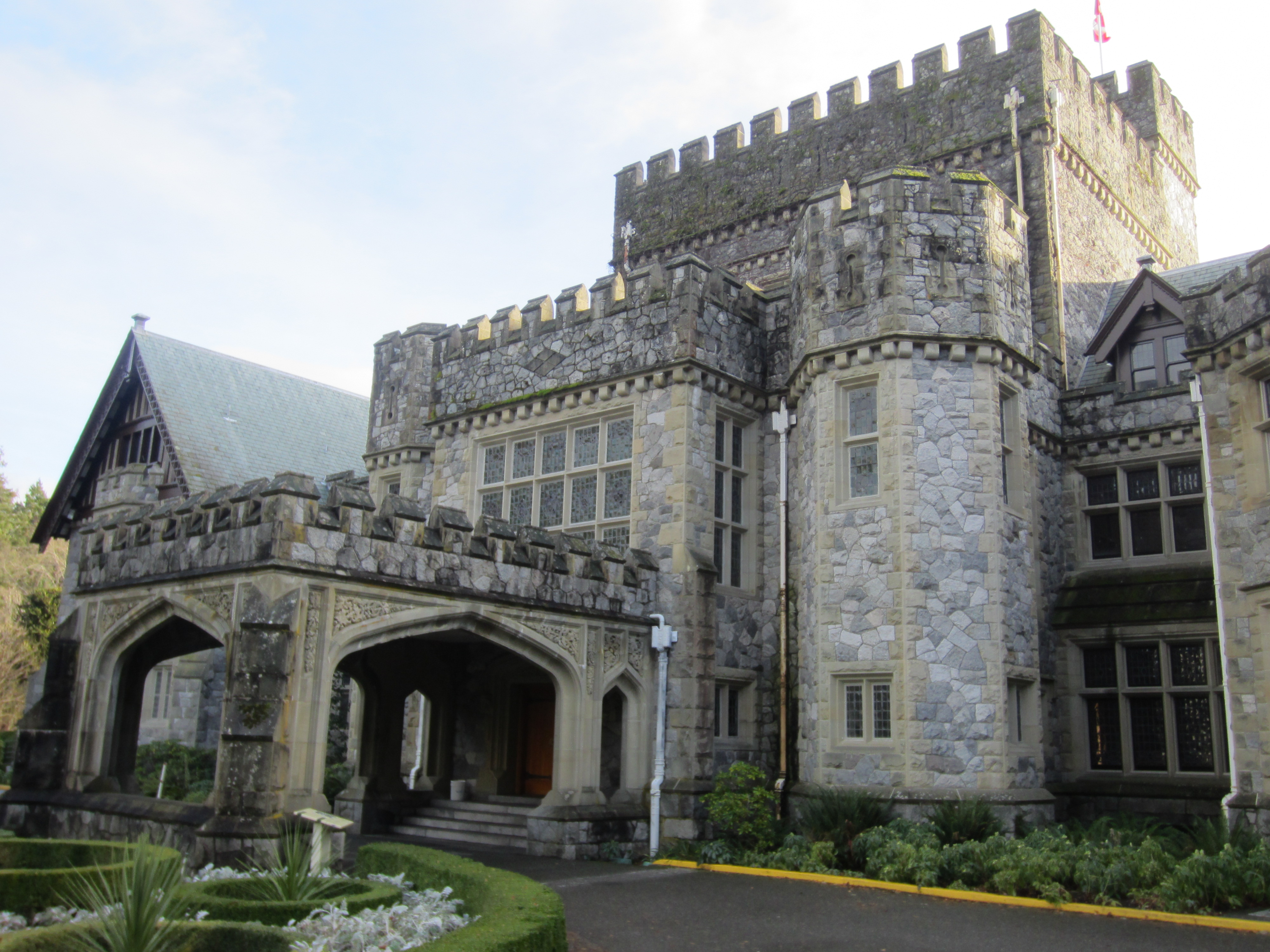
Hatley Castle

- British Columbia Penitentiary in New Westminster. The former penitentiary was active for 102 years, until decommissioned during the 1980s. Little of the building's remnants are left, save for the Boot Hill graveyard, where up to 62 inmates are buried in numbered graves. Boot Hill graveyard was first used for burial in 1916.
- Craigdarroch Castle in Victoria. This historic mansion was constructed in the late 1800s as a family residence for the wealthy Scottish coal baron Robert Dunsmuir and his wife Joan. Robert died in April 1889, 17 months before construction on the castle was completed, and his sons Alexander and James took over the role of finishing the castle. Ghost sightings have been reported at this location.
- Deadman’s Island in Vancouver is a supposedly haunted island that experienced many deaths. The Skwxwú7mesh (Squamish) people reported that both northern and southern nations had fought over the island, resulting in 200 deaths. After these deaths, the southern nations fled the island. In the 1890s it was used to house smallpox victims for quarantine. Victims of the Great Vancouver fire of 1886 and Canadian Pacific Rail workers have also died on the island, and bright orbs of light have been reported in the forest, as well as the clattering of bones and shrieking of dead men.
- The Empress Hotel in downtown Victoria. One of the oldest hotels in the British Columbian capital, it was designed by Francis Rattenbury and opened in 1908. Undergoing two expansions (the first was in 1910–1912 and the second was in 1928), it welcomed several prominent personalities such as kings, queens, and movie personalities of the 1900s. However, the existence of multiple paranormal activities is possible, most notably the ghosts of the hotel's designer (who was murdered in 1935), a maid on the 6th floor, and a construction worker who killed himself.
- The Fairmont Hotel Vancouver in Downtown Vancouver. Opened in 1939, it is touted as one of Canada's grand railway hotels. It is allegedly haunted by a "lady in red", which is also said by believers to be the ghost of a Vancouver socialite named Jennie Pearl Cox.
- Hatley Castle in Colwood. This castle, now home to the public Royal Roads University, is considered to be haunted by a parlor maid named Annabelle, and James Dunsmuir's son, James Dunsmuir Jr. It was featured by Creepy Canada, and also has been used in many Marvel Marvel Cinematic Universe Franchise films, such as X-Men and Deadpool.
- Hycroft Manor, a mansion in the upscale Vancouver neighborhood of Shaughnessy.
- New Westminster Secondary School in New Westminster. One of the largest high schools in British Columbia, it witnessed the drowning of a boy in the basement pool in the early 1970s. That boy is claimed to haunt the high school.
- The Old Spaghetti Factory in the historic district of Gastown, Vancouver, is claimed to be haunted. Most notable is a phantom tram conductor that supposedly appears in an old trolley within the restaurant.

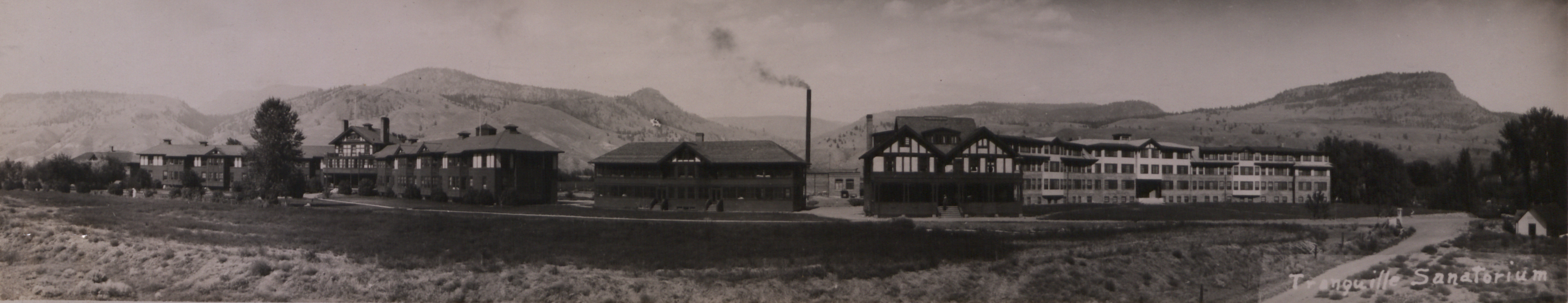
Tranquille Sanatorium in 1920

- Tranquille Sanatorium, located near Kamloops, is also considered by believers to be haunted. It opened in 1907 as a tuberculosis sanitorium, and witnessed the deaths of many of its patients.
- Vogue Theatre in Vancouver. Used for plays and concerts, it is reported to be haunted.
- Waterfront Station, the main transit terminus in Downtown Vancouver, is considered to be the "most haunted building in Vancouver", with multiple reports of apparitions and furniture moving on their own accord.

== Manitoba ==
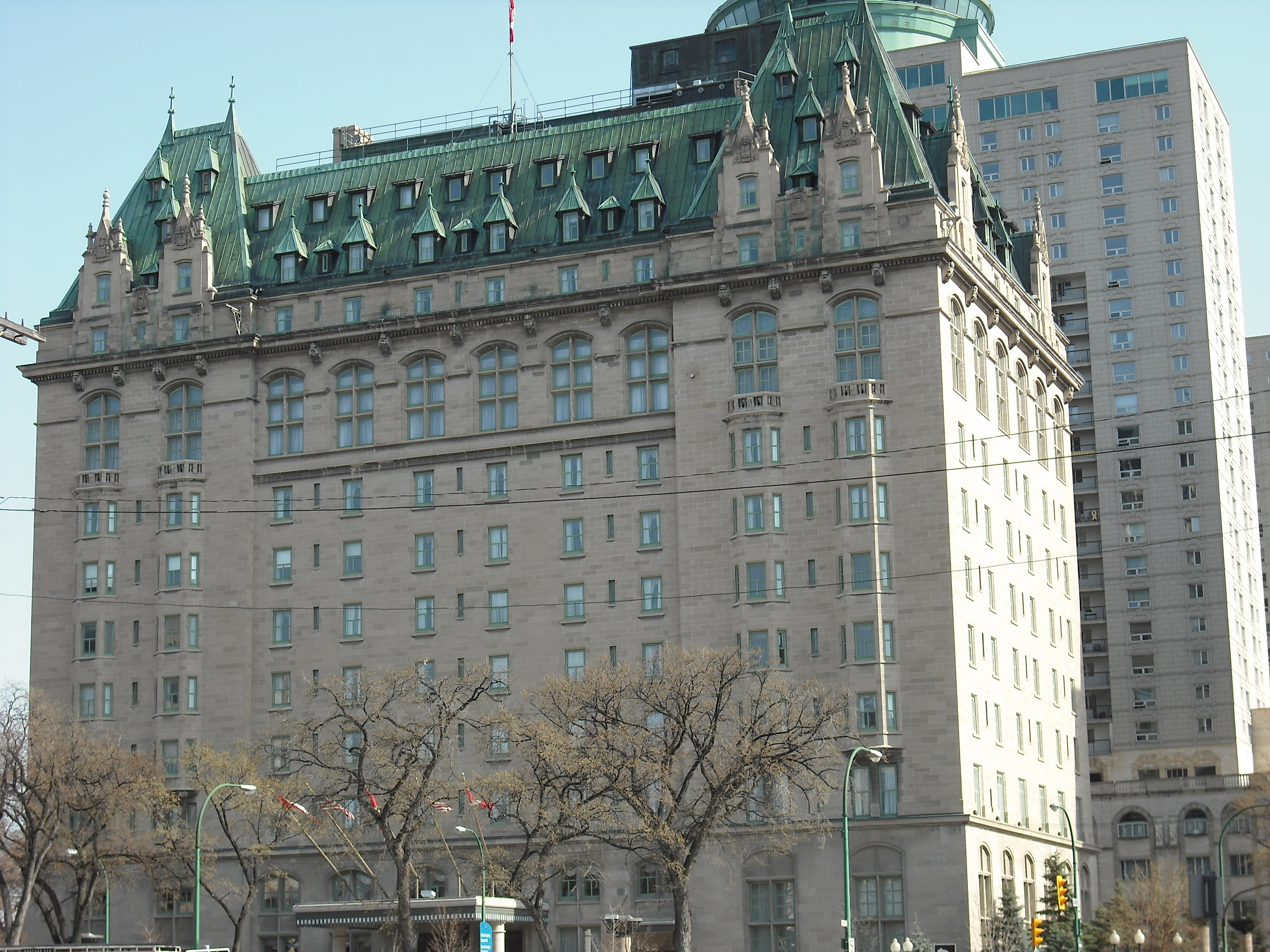
Fort Garry Hotel

- Burton Cummings Theatre in Winnipeg. It was featured by Creepy Canada.
- Fort Garry Hotel in Winnipeg. Specifically, Room 202 is allegedly the spot where a woman committed suicide after knowing her husband perished in an automobile accident. One such believer was former Liberal MP Brenda Chamberlain. It was featured by Creepy Canada.
- Fort La Reine in Port la Prairie.
- La Barriere Park in the Rural Municipality of Ritchot.
- Mallard Lodge & the Delta Marsh Field Station in Portage la Prairie. It was featured by Creepy Canada and is believed to be haunted by one of the old groundskeepers named Murray, as well as a worker who was working on construction of the lodge in 1932 who fell into the building’s foundation and was sealed in. His bones remain there still.
- Royal Manitoba Theatre Centre in Winnipeg.
- St. Ignatius School in Winnipeg, said to be the witness of the death of a little girl due to accident while playing in the playground.
- St. Norbert Monastery, a former Trappist monastery in St. Norbert that was set ablaze in 1983, and is now an arts and cultural centre.

== New Brunswick ==
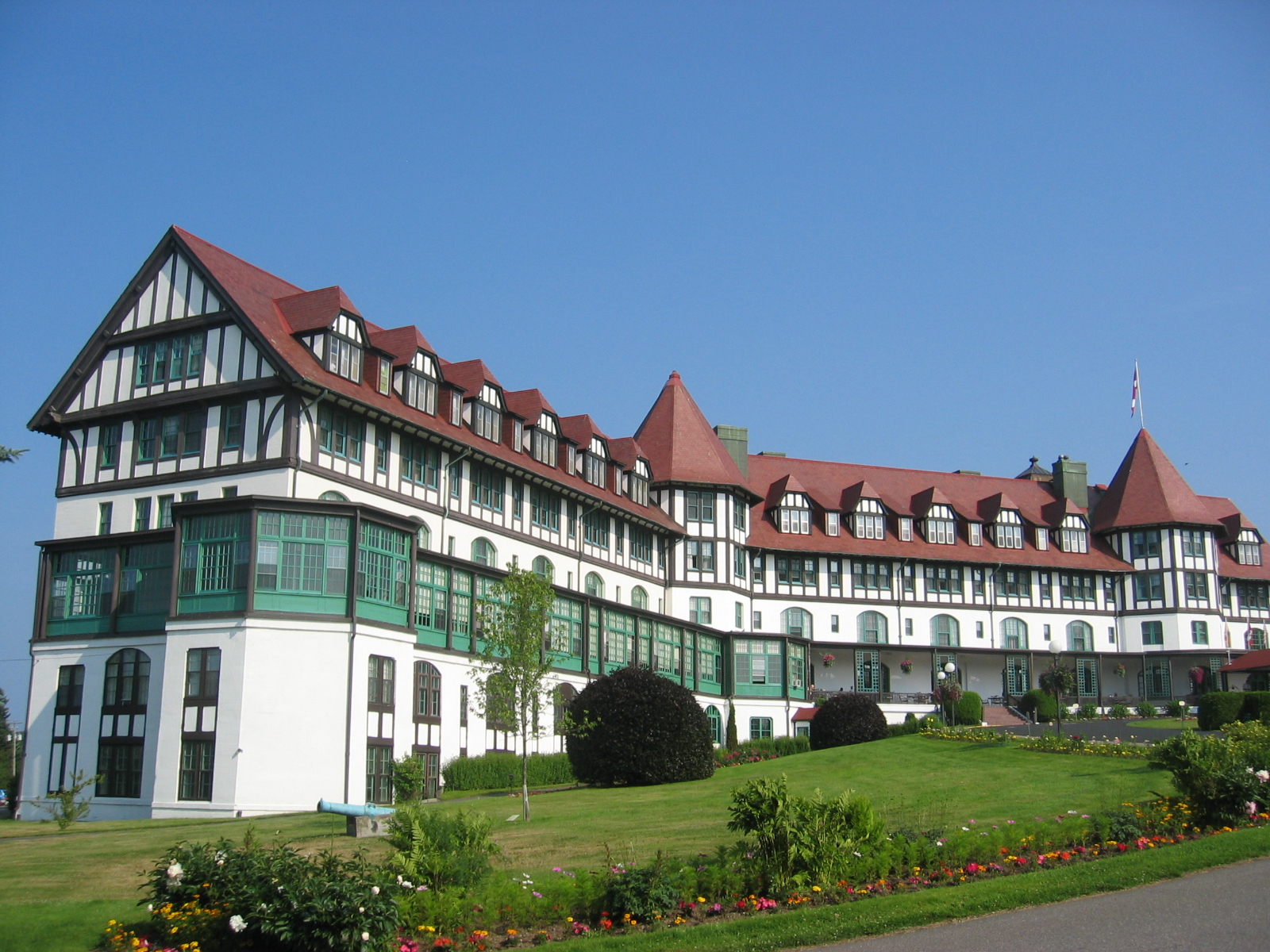
The Algonquin Resort

- The Algonquin Resort in St. Andrews. It was featured by Creepy Canada.
- Charlotte County Court House in St. Andrews. Believed to be haunted by executed convicts, it was built in the 1840s. One of the apparent sightings in the courthouse is a tall man holding a rope, seemingly looking for something. It was featured by Creepy Canada.
- Fireship of Baie des Chaleurs is a 16th-century ship of forty Portuguese settlers that was set afire by a British army. People report seeing it every few years and it is believed to bring bad luck, as most sailors who witness it end up in sailing accidents.
- Miramichi River Valley. The Dungarvon Whooper reputedly haunts this Dungarvon River, which runs in Miramichi near the Bartholomew River. The Dungarvon Whooper was believed to be a chef at a logging camp who’d had his throat slit and money stolen by a fellow logger. However, this myth has been debunked and now the Dungarvon Whooper is believed to be an American Civil War veteran who lived in the woods. It was featured by Mystery Hunters and Creepy Canada.

== Newfoundland and Labrador ==
- Chez Briann Restaurant in St. John's, Newfoundland and Labrador. Now closed, used to be an apartment complex as well as a funeral home. People who stayed in the building when it was an apartment complex have reported seeing a man hovering over them while they sleep, or a woman with a jagged scar as if from an autopsy. It was featured on Creepy Canada.
- Wabana Iron Ore Mines on Bell Island. The Bell Island mines are said to have apparitions such as shadow figures, lights from the mines, and noises like voices, banging, clanging, and hissing. It was featured on Creepy Canada.

== Northwest Territories ==
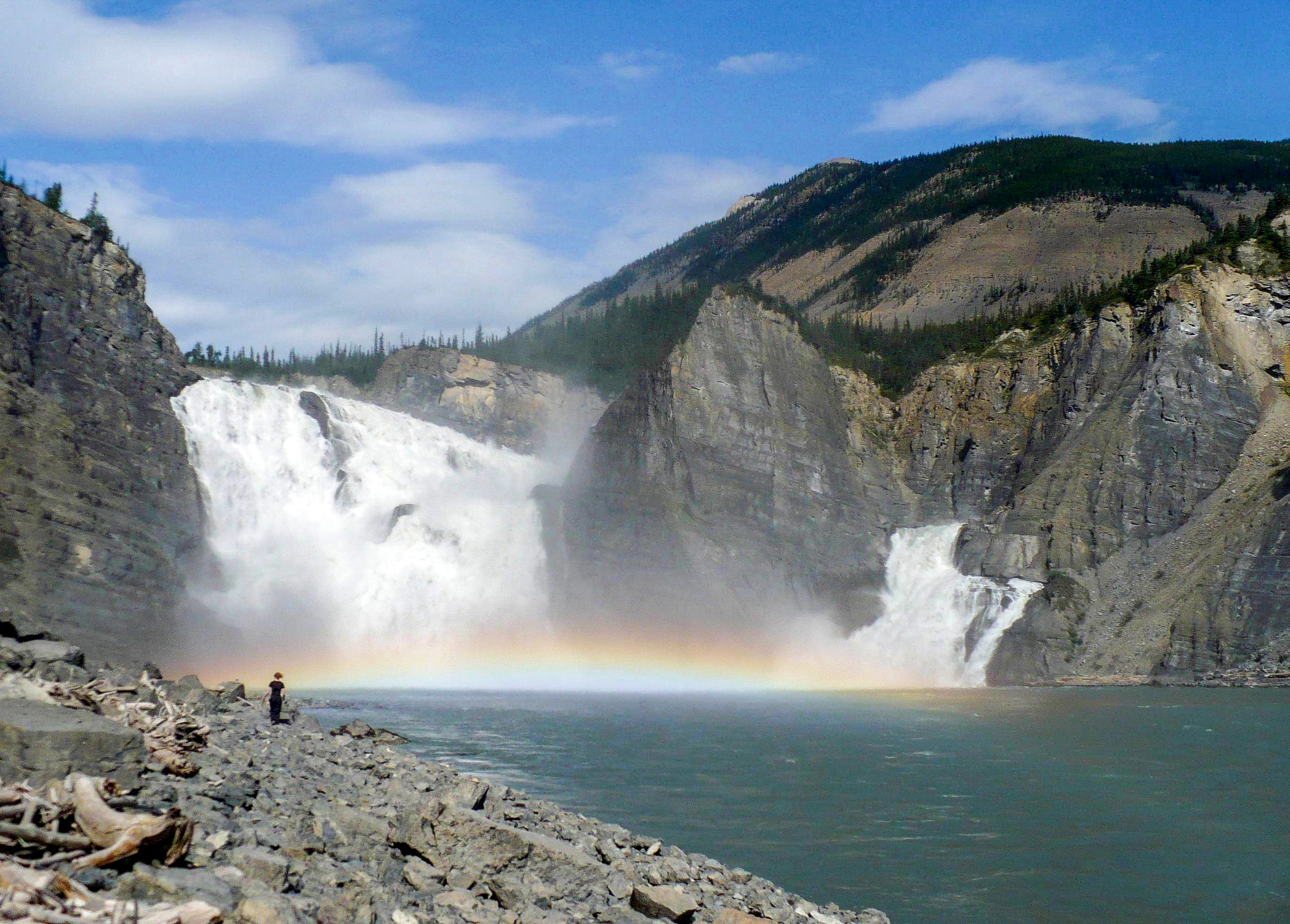
Nahanni National Park Reserve

- Nahanni National Park Reserve in Fort Simpson.

== Nova Scotia ==
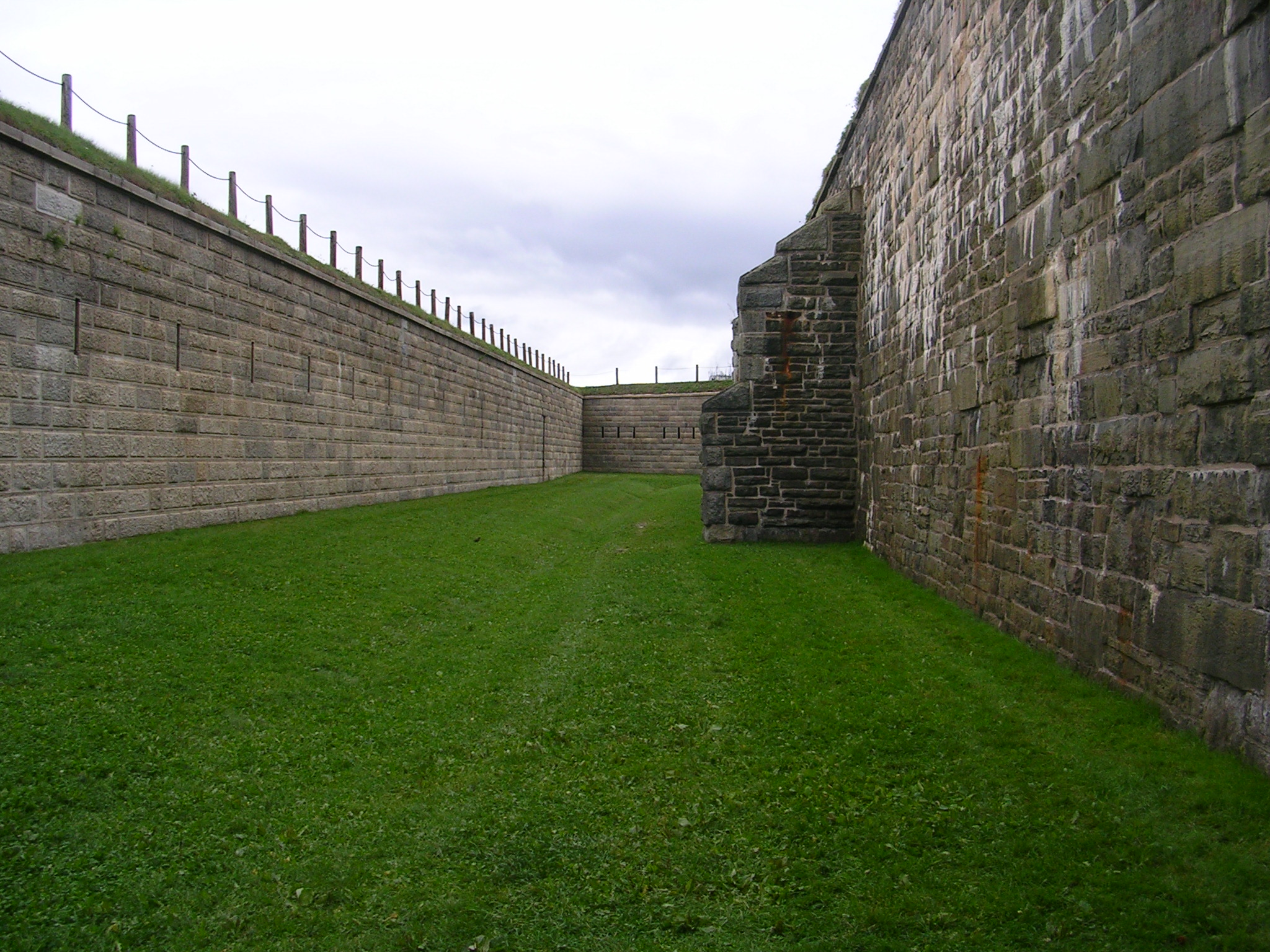
Inside the Citadel Hill in 2004

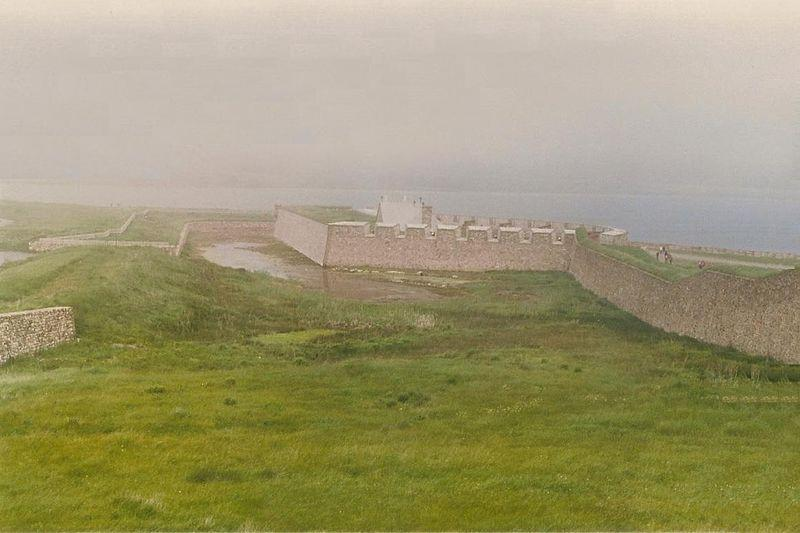
Fortress of Louisbourg's fortifications

- Acadia University in Wolfville. An apparitional Baptist girl who found out about her pregnancy in the 19th century hung herself in "the well", a large open area on the second floor (four-long) surrounded by banisters and under a candle light. Her ghost is most often seen by faculty staff members on the back stairwell at Seminary House's campus. Other paranormal activities are people having strange visions in this location, lights that turn on and off by themselves as well as doors opening and closing on their own, light anomalies, disembodied voices, objects moving by themselves and strange unexplained noises.
- All Saints Cathedral in Halifax. This church is allegedly haunted by one of the former deans. He is mostly standing at the altar.
- Bedford Basin in Halifax. This site is reportedly haunted by spirits of Native Canadians, French, British and Canadian soldiers and family members. There are touches, pushes and pulls by invisible presences, light anomalies, apparitional footsteps, shadowy figures disembodied voices and other unexplained noises.
- Citadel Hill in Halifax. Its legend is about a ghost of a woman named Cassie Allen. She intended to marry a sergeant in the early 1900s. On their wedding day, her fiancé fatally shot himself because he was already married to a woman who resided in Bermuda's asylum.
- Fortress of Louisbourg on Cape Breton Island. This massive fortress, constructed during the 1700s, was featured by Creepy Canada.
- Seal Island, an island on the outermost extreme of Southwestern Nova Scotia, in Municipalité Argyle in Yarmouth County. There is a local legend of a ghost from a shipwreck during 1891, the SS Ottawa. A stewardess named Annie Lindsey was believed drowned when her lifeboat overturned. She was buried beside the East End church where her grave marker can still be seen today. Some, however, believe that when the coffin was later disinterred, it showed evidence that she was buried alive. Her spirit is said to haunt the Seal Island villages.
- Young Teazer at Mahone Bay. Paranormal incidents have been reported by witnesses since it sunk on 27 June 1813. This ghostly burning schooner is seen by mariners on this bay. It is most often seen by visitors near the anniversary of this ship's fatal explosion in its historical location. Most witness reports state once seen it then just vanishes. It was featured by Creepy Canada.

== Ontario ==
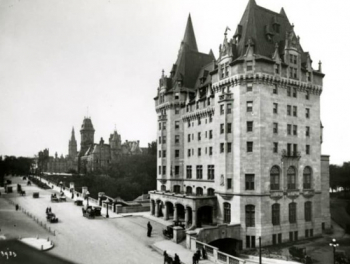
Fairmont Château Laurier 1912

- Albion Falls in Hamilton. Albion Falls is believed to be haunted by the ghost of a woman named Jane Riley, who jumped off of the falls after her engagement was cut. It was also a popular dumping ground for murder victims, such as John Dick. It was featured by Creepy Canada.
- Algonquin Provincial Park in South Algonquin. Tom Thomson's spirit allegedly wanders through this wilderness. It was featured by Mystery Hunters and Creepy Canada.
- Bytown Museum in Ottawa. This building is said to be haunted by Colonel John By, the builder of the canal, and his assistant General Duncan McNab. It was featured by Creepy Canada and The Girly Ghosthunters.
- Chateau Laurier in Ottawa.
- Fairmont Royal York in Toronto. Guests at this hotel have reported many strange paranormal experiences, such as hearing children’s footsteps in the halls of the eighth floor, seeing dark shadow figures, having strange feelings of unease and seeing the figure of a ghost bell boy. Workers at the hotel have also reported hearing screams, heavy footsteps and feeling sick while walking in one of the stairways up to the LED sign on the 23rd floor, acquitted to a worker who hung himself in the upper stairway years earlier. On floors like the 19th, used for electrical work, people have reported the devices randomly malfunctioning or having strange issues.
- Prince Arthur Hotel in Thunder Bay
- Fort George in Niagara-on-the-Lake. It was one of Canada's strongholds during the War of 1812. It was featured by Creepy Canada, The Girly Ghosthunters, and "Knock Knock Ghost".
- Fort Henry National Historic Site in Kingston. It was featured by Creepy Canada, The Girly Ghosthunters, and "Knock Knock Ghost."
- Gibraltar Point Lighthouse on Toronto Islands. The first lighthouse keeper, John Paul Radelmuller, was murdered by soldiers from nearby Fort York looking for bootlegged beer on 2 January 1815. These soldiers were charged with murder, but were eventually acquitted. A coffin was found in 1893 buried in the sand with a jawbone in it, however, it is not clear whether this was part of the lighthouse keeper's remains or not. It was featured by Creepy Canada.
- Grand Theatre in London. Ambrose Small's apparition reputedly roams this theatre. It was featured by Mystery Hunters, The Girly Ghosthunters, and "Knock Knock Ghost."
- Hockey Hall of Fame in Toronto.
- Keefer Mansion in Thorold. It was featured by Creepy Canada.
- Kingston Penitentiary in Kingston. It was featured by Creepy Canada.
- Mackenzie Inn in Kirkfield. It was featured by Creepy Canada.
- Mather-Walls House in Kenora. It was featured by Creepy Canada.
- Ottawa Jail Hostel in Ottawa. It was featured by Creepy Canada, The Girly Ghosthunters, Mystery Hunters and "Knock Knock Ghost."
- Screaming Tunnel in Niagara Falls. Local legend says this tunnel is haunted by the ghost of a young girl who died from burns due to a fire—either from her home or father.
- Old Fort Erie in Fort Erie. It was featured by Ghost Adventures and "Knock Knock Ghost".
- Picton in Prince Edward County. The harbor is allegedly haunted by "Picton Pete" the ghost of a sailor who died during the 1921 sinking of the Oliver Mowatt schooner.
- Merritton Tunnel (Blue Ghost Tunnel) in Niagara Falls. This old train tunnel is rumoured to be haunted by a nearby cemetery and the ghosts of two firefighters who died in a train collision in the west end of the tunnel.
- Buck Hill in Round Lake, Ontario.
- Texas Road in Amherstburg.
- Weston & Highway 7 in Vaughan. This site is allegedly haunted by a 19th-century little girl who lost her life in a fire.
- Whitby Junction Station in Whitby. Now an art gallery, it is said to be haunted by the former telegraph operator murdered at the railway station.
- Windermere House in Windermere.
- Ruthven National Historic Park in Cayuga. It was featured by Knock Knock Ghost.
- The Towers Building (Scottish Rite) in Hamilton. It was featured by Knock Knock Ghost.
- St. Thomas Psychiatric Hospital in St. Thomas. It was featured by Knock Knock Ghost.

== Prince Edward Island ==
- Ghost Ship of Northumberland Strait is described as a beautiful schooner that has three masts (sometimes four masts, as reports vary) with pure white sails, all of which become completely engulfed in flames as onlookers watch. There never seems to be a predetermined place for where the ship will appear. Sightings have occurred throughout the seasons, but seem to be more prevalent from September to November. These visions are also apparent before a northeast wind, and folklore has it that this brilliant ghost ship is a forewarning of a storm.
- The Kings Playhouse in Georgetown, Prince Edward Island is said to be haunted by a naval captain and other spirits lost at sea. Originally built in the 1880s, the Playhouse served as a townhall and recreational facility. After a devastating fire in 1983, the theatre was rebuilt, but the hauntings continued. Spirits are said to often be seen near the stage, in the upstairs hallway, or heard whistling from afar. It was featured by Creepy Canada.

== Quebec ==
- 1234 De La Montagne in Montreal. It was featured by Creepy Canada.
- Auberge Le Saint-Gabriel in Old Montreal. This site is allegedly haunted by a 19th-century little girl who lost her life in a fire.
- Cathedral of the Holy Trinity in Quebec City. It was featured by Creepy Canada.
- Chateau Frontenac in Quebec City.
- Grey Nuns Motherhouse in Ville-Marie, Montreal.
- John Abbott College in Montreal. This building is about 100 years old. Spirits allegedly roam around in a specific areas, opening doors. The spirits have been recognized by the janitors or guards, and by the students.
- McGill University in Montreal.
- Mount Royal Cemetery in Montreal.
- Plains of Abraham in Quebec City.
- Queen Elizabeth Hotel in Montreal.
- St. John's Shrewsbury Anglican Church in Gore.

== Saskatchewan ==
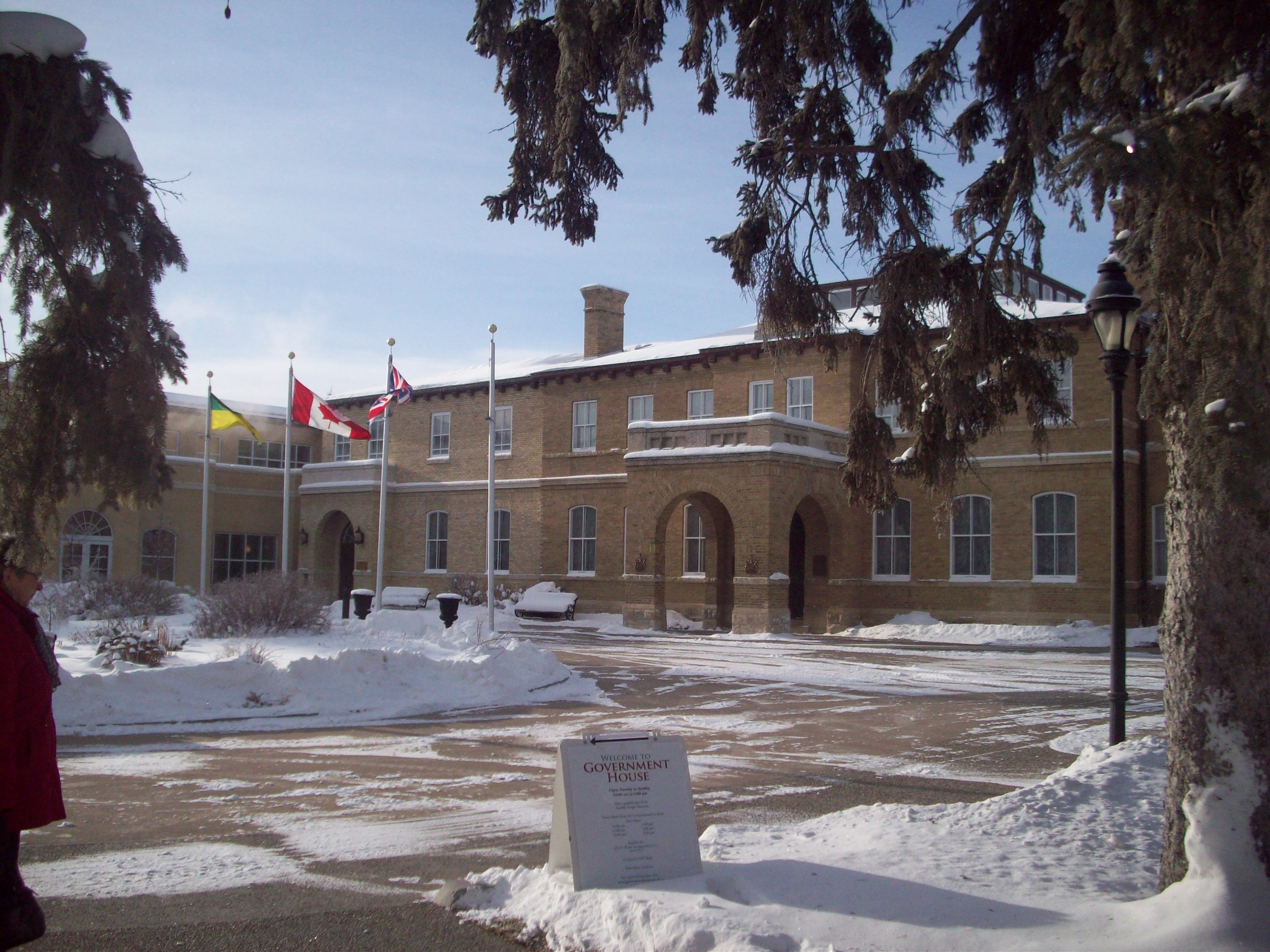
Government House with adjacent visitor and administration centre

- Assiniboia Club in Regina. It was featured by Creepy Canada.
- Darke Hall in Regina. It was featured by Creepy Canada.
- Fort Battleford in Battleford.
- Fort San in Fort Qu'Appelle.
- Government House in Regina.
- Gravelbourg School in Gravelbourg.
- Hopkins Dining Parlour in Moose Jaw. It was featured by Creepy Canada.
- Kerrobert Court House in Kerrobert.
- Moosehead Inn on Kenosee Lake.
- Marr Residence in Saskatoon. It was featured by Creepy Canada.
- Park Town Hotel in Saskatoon.
- St. Louis, a village near Prince Albert, where witnesses claim to have observed apparitions known as the St. Louis light, attributed to a railroad accident that killed a family and the resultant suicide of the engineer responsible for the mishap.
- St. Paul's Hospital in Saskatoon.
- Saskatchewan Hospital in North Battleford. The original buildings of the hospital from the early 20th century, in the adjacent census subdivision of the North Battleford Crown Colony, still stand and had witnessed the most distressing conditions brought forth by extreme overcrowding. The fate of the old structures remain unknown, as the newer and more modern hospital was opened on 14 March 2019.
- Souris Valley Mental Health Hospital, also known as Weyburn Mental Hospital, a now-demolished (since 2009) institution for mentally insane in Weyburn. One of the first institutions for such purpose in the 1930s, it was notorious for using cutting edge experimental medical treatments for people with mental health issues, including some of the controversial LSD treatments in Canada.

== See also ==
- List of reportedly haunted locations in the United States
- List of reportedly haunted locations in France
- Reportedly haunted locations in the United Kingdom
