= Joseph Lemay =

Canadian politician (1829–1892)

Joseph Octave Lemay (18 March 1829 – 12 December 1892) was a businessman and political figure in Manitoba and Minnesota. He represented St. Norbert North from 1871 to 1874 and St. Vital from 1874 to 1878 in the Legislative Assembly of Manitoba.

He was born in Saint-Louis-de-Lotbiniere, Lower Canada the son of Joseph Isaie Lemay. The younger Lemay became an American citizen and was elected to the Minnesota Territorial House of Representatives for District 2 in 1854 as a Democrat. He also served as a justice of the peace for Minnesota. In 1855, Lemay married Marie Julie Camille Auger. He was put in charge of U.S. Customs for the town of Pembina, North Dakota. After an attack by the Sioux, Lemay moved to Upper Fort Garry and then St. Norbert, where he had a house built that eventually became the Asile Ritchot church building. He owned a steam mill and speculated on the value of land. Lemay was heavyset and was said to require two chairs when he sat in the assembly. He was a founding member of the Winnipeg Board of Trade in 1873.

After his death, Lemay's property in St. Norbert was donated to the local Catholic church and was later used as an orphanage. The Ritchot Orphanage (in French, Asile Ritchot), named after Father Joseph-Noël Ritchot, is now a Manitoba historical site.
