= Shrewsbury, Quebec =

Coordinates: 45°47′25.3″N 74°17′32.0″W

Shrewsbury is a ghost town in the Canadian province of Quebec, located within the township of Gore in Argenteuil Regional County Municipality.

For a time its sole remaining structure was the so-called Shrewsbury ghost church, but now this church has burned down.
