= Trappist Monastery Provincial Park =

Provincial park in Manitoba, Canada

- IUCN category V (protected landscape/seascape)
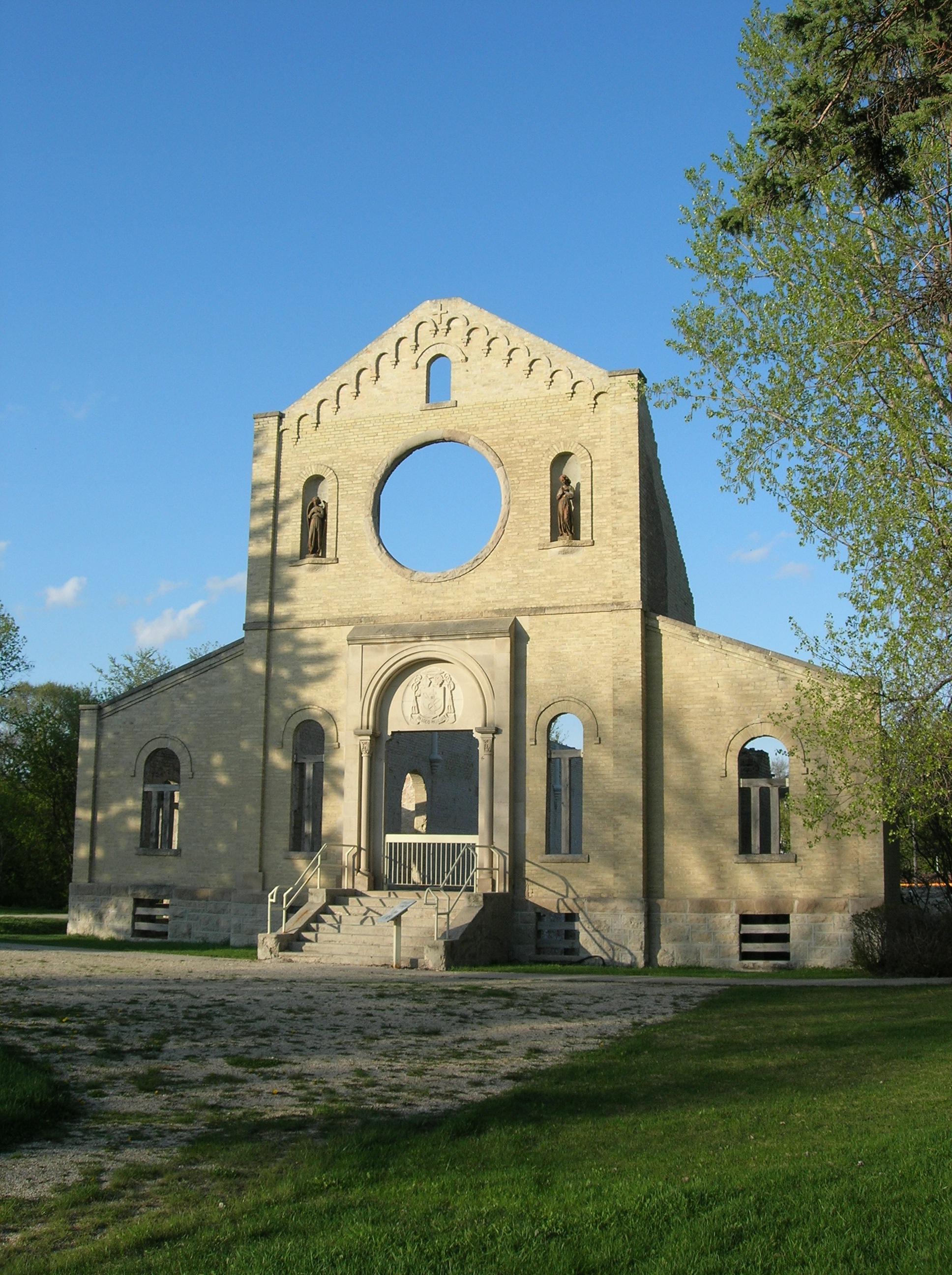

- Location within Manitoba
- Interactive map of Trappist Monastery Provincial Park
- Location: Manitoba, Canada
- Nearest city: Winnipeg, Manitoba
- Coordinates: 49°45′30″N 97°9′11″W
- Area: .02 km^{2} (0.0077 sq mi)
- Established: 2002
- Governing body: Government of Manitoba

Trappist Monastery Provincial Park is a provincial park in the St. Norbert area of Winnipeg, Manitoba, Canada. It is 20,000 m^{2} (4.9 acres) in size.

Designated a provincial park by the Government of Manitoba in 2002, it is considered to be a Class V protected area under the IUCN protected area management categories.

== See also ==
- List of protected areas of Manitoba
