= St. John's Shrewsbury Anglican Church =

Coordinates: 45°47′25.59″N 74°17′32.15″W

- Location within Central Quebec
- Location: 122 Chemin de Shrewsbury, Gore, Quebec
- Country: Canada
- Previous denomination: Anglican

History
- Status: Church (closed)
- Founded: 1858
- Dedication: John the Apostle
- Events: Winter services discontinued (1958); Fire destroyed building (2014)

Architecture
- Functional status: Abandoned; Deconsecrated
- Architectural type: Church
- Closed: December 4, 2010

Specifications
- Materials: Timber

The St. John's Shrewsbury Anglican Church is a former Anglican church located in the former township of Shrewsbury, part of present-day Gore, Quebec, Canada. It has become known informally as the "Shrewsbury ghost church".

== Founding ==
The church had different cited building dates, all in the 1850s, with the earliest construction date by Irish and Scottish pioneers listed as 1851. There is an adjacent cemetery; the earliest known burial, according to tombstones, was 1868, although earlier possible burials are unconfirmed, since some stones are missing. The most recent burial was 2005.

== Vandalism ==
Reports indicate that the church was the target of serious vandalism for forty years. Repeated attacks began in the early 1970s, at a time when it was still being used regularly for services. The Vankleek Hill Review reports: "Over the past few decades the little church survived destruction, defecation, robbery and vandalism. The bells were stolen from the bell-tower on three separate occasions during the past three decades alone. The interior and exterior of the building were attacked with axes, hammers and spray paint and many of the tombstones were toppled and defaced."

== Fame ==
Of late the church has attracted ghost hunters, witches and vandals, after being mistakenly described online as a "ghost church" rather than a church in a ghost town. A popular online rumor has the church's congregation committing mass suicide. Unofficial ghost walks are frequently conducted here as well as graveyard séances. Some vandalized gravestones in the hopes of rousing spirits. The church building had been emptied of its contents, including the bell, by souvenir seekers. Two tombstones were also stolen.

== Deconsecration ==
As a result of these incidents, a Deconsecration service was performed on December 4, 2010. The municipality of Gore, Quebec expected to renovate the church with the help of government grants, and intended to use it as a community centre.

== Fire ==
On January 12, 2014, the church burned to the ground and was totally destroyed. An early 2014 investigation into this incident considered possible arson. On January 22, 2014, a letter to the editor of the Vankleek Hill Review from Rodney Brown of Brownsburg-Chatham argued that the fire reflected local language tensions: "Part of my ancestral history perished on Sunday, January 12[, 2014]. The Shrewsbury Church, in the municipality of Gore, built in 1856, was burned down by someone who obviously has [n]o respect o[r] appreciation for English history in this province. The ravaging of this church has been ongoing for several years now, while authorities in a position to protect this sacred place of worship did little or nothing to discourage the culprits. ... Forget any help from the Sûreté de Québec – it does not take a rocket scientist to figure out why."

People from the municipality of Gore who attempted to protect the church were volunteers and mainly descendants of the area's original settlers. They blamed groups of teenagers from neighboring communities, including the predominantly Francophone Saint-Jérôme, for years of vandalism and possible arson. The destruction of the church has devastated the local Anglophone community, who count this site as a symbolic cornerstone of their history.
