= Joseph-Noël Ritchot =

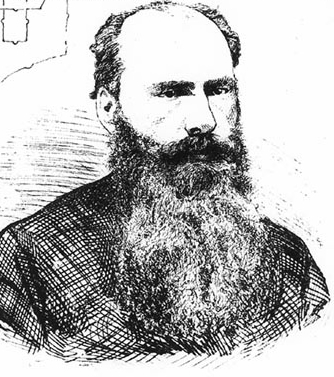
Father Ritchot

Father Joseph-Noël Ritchot (25 December 1825 – 16 March 1905), commonly known as Father Noël-Joseph Ritchot, was a Roman Catholic priest noted for his role in negotiating with the Government of Canada on behalf of the Métis during the Red River Resistance of 1869–1870.

== Biography ==
Ritchot was born into a farming family in L'Assomption, In Lower Canada, in 1825. He studied and later taught at the College de L'Assomption before being ordained as a Catholic priest on 22 December 1855. In 1862 he volunteered to serve in Rupert's Land under Bishop Alexandre-Antonin Taché; he was assigned to a parish at St Norbert. This parish was central to the Red River Rebellion, and Ritchot became involved as an advisor to the Métis leaders; his participation "gave legitimacy to the movement".

After the establishment of a provisional government by the Métis, Ritchot was made one of the territory's three delegates to Ottawa, representing the concerns of the Métis to the Government of Canada in seeking the admission of Manitoba into the Canadian Confederation. After briefly being arrested on charges of being complicit in the death of Thomas Scott, Ritchot, who led the negotiations, "secured provincial status for the colony, along with the establishment of bilingual and bicultural institutions [...and] 1,400,000 acres of land set aside for the Métis", which led to enactment of the Manitoba Act. Prime Minister John A. Macdonald referred to Ritchot as an "obdurate priest". Ritchot believed, as a sine qua non for talks to start, that he had also secured amnesty for those involved in the resistance, which was privately agreed to with Ottawa but Ontario pressure made it impossible to publicly announce an amnesty.

Many Métis, unsatisfied with their treatment by the Canadians, left for territories further west. Ritchot bought riverside land from those departing to resell to French-Canadian immigrants, and also gave lands to allow the Trappists to settle in the new province. By 1897 he had become both vicar general and apostolic prothonotary. He died on 16 March 1905, at which point he was "dean of secular clergy in the St. Boniface diocese". The Historic Sites and Monuments Board of Canada dedicated a plaque to Ritchot in 1995.
