= St. Norbert, Winnipeg =

Suburb of Winnipeg

St. Norbert Saint Norbert
- Suburb
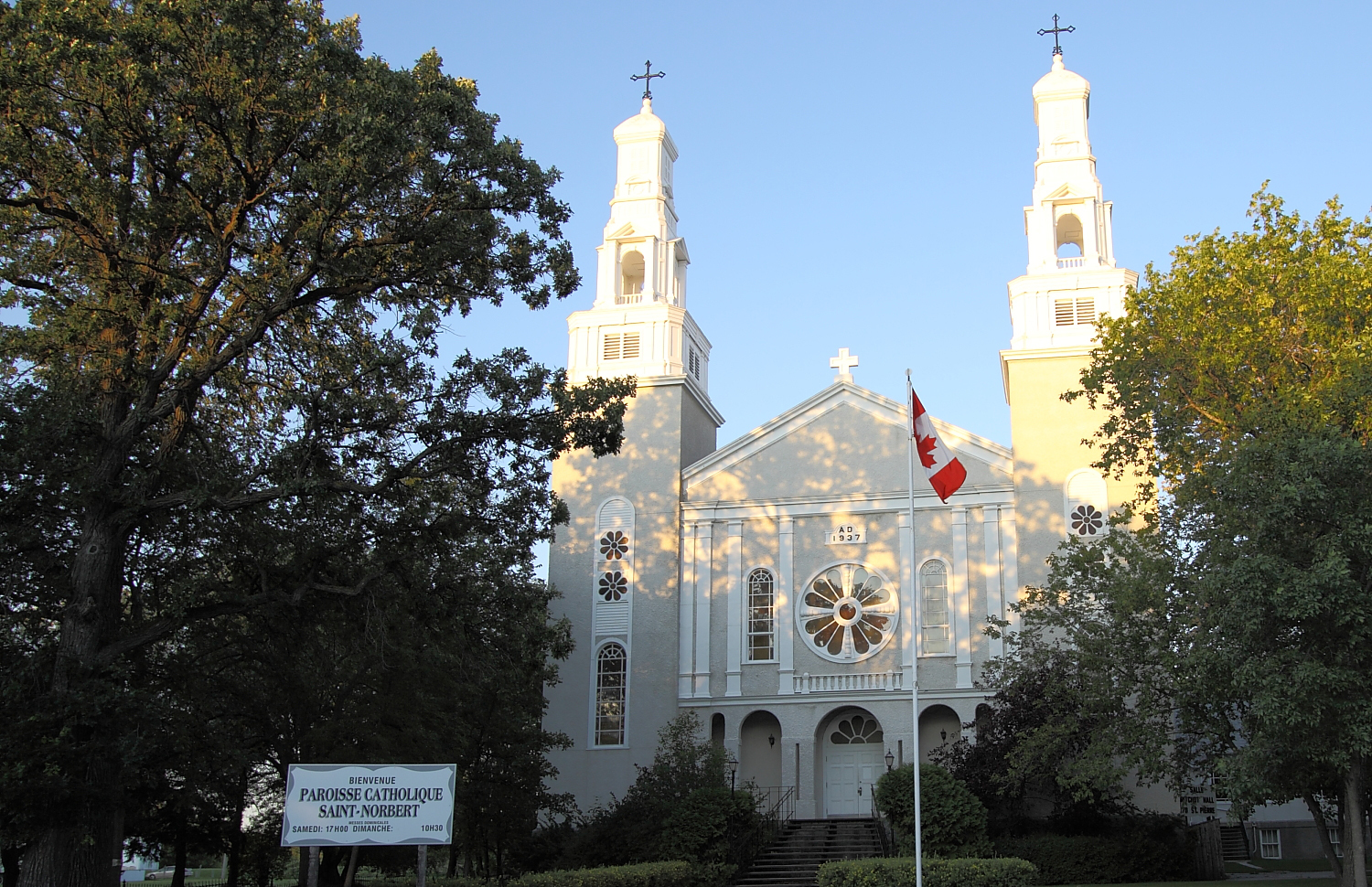
- Paroisse Catholique Saint-Norbert

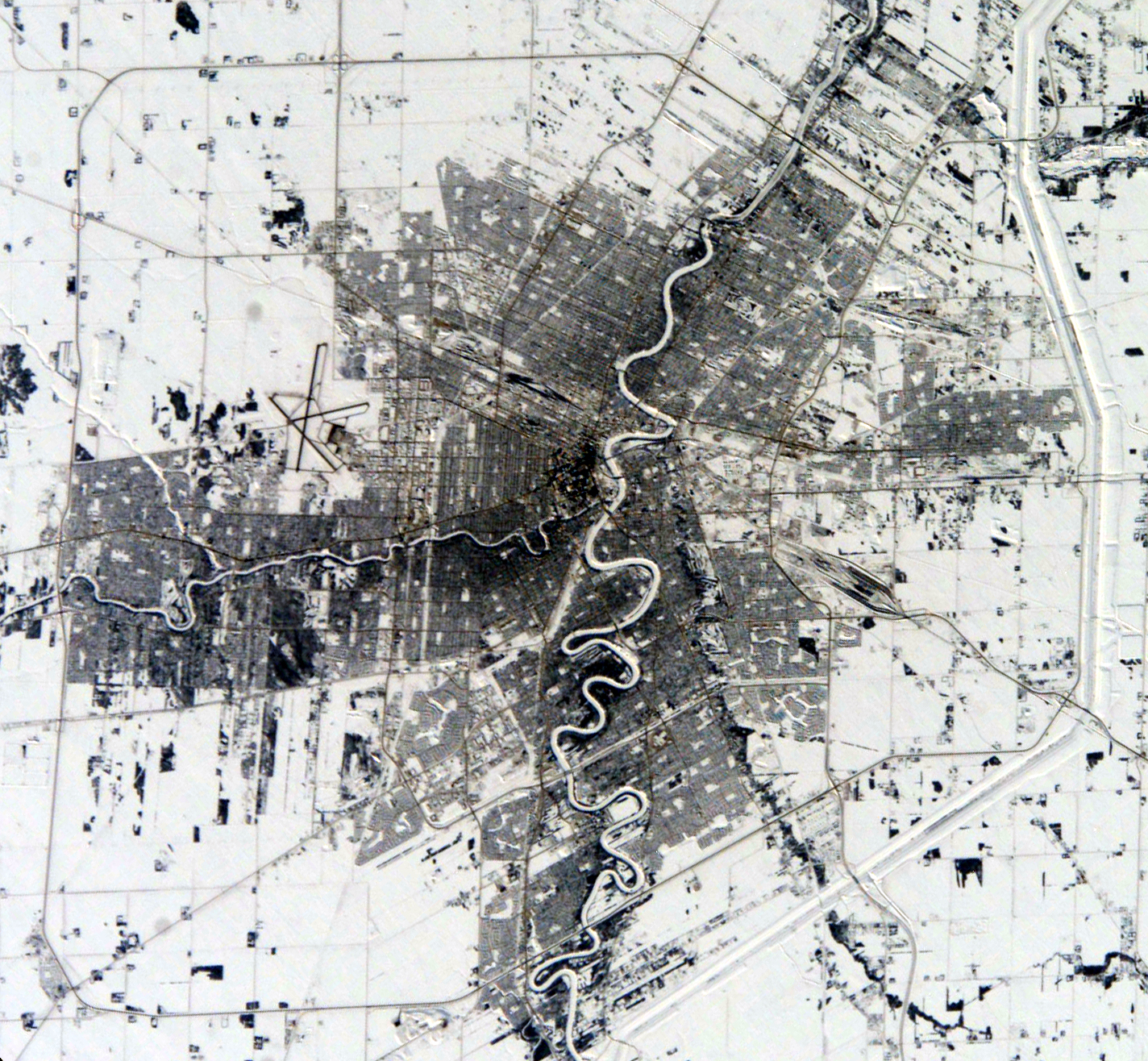
- Location within Winnipeg
- Coordinates: 49.77°N 97.145°W
- Country: Canada
- Province: Manitoba
- City: Winnipeg
- Established (Parish): 1857
- Incorporated as a Village: 1893

Government
  - MP: Terry Duguid (Winnipeg South)
  - MLA: Billie Cross (Seine River)
  - City Councillor: Markus Chambers (St. Norbert-Seine River)

Area
  - Suburb: 3.8 km^{2} (1.5 sq mi)
  - Metro: 5,306.79 km^{2} (2,048.96 sq mi)
- Elevation: 233 m (764 ft)

Population (2016)
  - Suburb: 5,850
  - Density: 1,500/km^{2} (4,000/sq mi)
  - Metro: 778,489
- Time zone: Central Standard Time
  - Summer (DST): Central Daylight Time
- Forward Sortation Area: R3V
- Area codes: 204, 431

St. Norbert (French: Saint-Norbert) is a bilingual (French and English) neighbourhood and the southernmost suburb of Winnipeg, Manitoba, Canada. While outside the Perimeter Highway (the orbital road that surrounds most of Winnipeg), it is still part of the city. As of the 2016 Census, the population of St. Norbert is 5,850.

The community is home to the St. Norbert Farmers' Market, drawing large crowds from Winnipeg and the surrounding area. Other attractions include the St. Norbert Provincial Heritage Park, and the St. Norbert Arts and Cultural Centre. St. Norbert is the closest community to the gates of the Red River Floodway.

St. Norbert is also part of the larger Winnipeg city ward of St. Norbert-Seine River, which includes much of the Fort Garry South neighbourhood cluster and a small part of St. Vital. In Winnipeg's nonpartisan municipal politics, Markus Chambers is the ward's representative on Winnipeg City Council. He has served since 2018. In provincial politics, St. Norbert is part of the Seine River riding, with New Democratic Party Member of the Legislative Assembly Billie Cross as its representative in the Legislative Assembly of Manitoba. She has served since 2023. In federal politics, the area is part of the Winnipeg South riding, with Liberal Member of Parliament Terry Duguid as its representative in the House of Commons of Canada. He has served since 2015.

== History ==
The original inhabitants of what is now St. Norbert were First Nations peoples, including the Assiniboine, the Cree, and the Ojibwe (Saulteaux), who were drawn to this region because of its hunting and fishing opportunities. The community bordered on two rivers—the Red and La Salle (called Ia riviere Sale until 1975)—and a bison trail ran from the south bank of the La Salle River to bison hunting grounds nearly 50 kilometres away.

In 1822, with the development of the fur trade in the 18th century, the Métis nation was the first to take over the region of current-day St. Norbert. In addition to their commercial endeavours, they cultivated the land into long river lots perpendicular to the waterway. The area would soon after be settled in the early part of the 19th century by former employees of the North West Company—workers (primarily of French and Métis descent) who were left unemployed following the North West Company’s amalgamation with the Hudson Bay Company (HBC) in 1821. St. Norbert’s prime location along major trade and transportation routes proved advantageous; the Pembina Trail (now Pembina Highway) passed through St. Norbert as it routed travellers from Upper Fort Garry (present-day downtown Winnipeg, and the primary southern outpost of the HBC) to St. Paul, Minnesota—the nearest railhead. As such, along with taking part in the bi-annual buffalo hunt, the settlers took on seasonal work for the HBC, hauling goods between the Red River Settlement and St. Paul.

Following the establishment of the community's first parish church in 1857 by Roman Catholic missionaries, many of the community’s inhabitants took on a more sedentary farming life. The parish was given the name St. Norbert by Bishop Alexandre-Antonin Taché in honour of the patron saint of Bishop Joseph-Norbert Provencher, the first bishop of St. Boniface. The first parish priest, Father Jean-Marie Lestanc, was followed by Father Charles Mestre in 1860, then by Father Noël-Joseph Ritchot in 1862. Father Mestre helped the parish establish its first cemetery.

In December 1858, Bishop Tache brought two Grey Nuns to St. Norbert to establish a convent and school.

In October 1869, a public meeting was held at St. Norbert Roman Catholic Church (built in 1856) during which the Comite national des Métis was formed, with Louis Riel as secretary. As the first act of the committee, on October 16, the Riel-led Métis erected a barricade across the Pembina Trail at St. Norbert to prevent the newly-appointed lieutenant governor of the Northwest Territories, William McDougall from taking possession of the territory on behalf of the Canadian government. During this crisis, Riel sent Father Ritchot and two other emissaries to Ottawa to negotiate the entry of Manitoba into Confederation. Between the time following the crisis and the early 20th century, French Canadians from Quebec, most of whom were farmers, gradually replaced the Métis in St. Norbert until they formed the majority of the population.

== Geography ==
St. Norbert is the southern gateway into the city of Winnipeg. Located just south of the Perimeter Highway, the community consists of what is called St. Norbert Village (the original community) and several modern suburbs. The village is geographically bounded by the Red and La Salle Rivers, and by the Perimeter Highway.

=== St. Norbert-Seine River ===
St. Norbert is part of the larger Winnipeg city ward of St. Norbert-Seine River, which includes much of the Fort Garry South neighbourhood cluster and a small part of St. Vital.

In addition to that of St. Norbert, neighbourhoods in the St. Norbert-Seine River ward include:

- Normand Park
- River Park South
- Dakota Crossing
- St. Vital Perimeter South
- Maple Grove Park
- Fort Richmond
- Cloutier Drive
- Richmond Lakes
- University
- Parc La Salle
- Turnbull Drive
- Perrault
- Trappistes
- La Barriere

Neighbourhood populations
	2016 Pop.	Land Area (sq. km.)
Richmond Lakes	1,620	0.6
St. Norbert	1,765	1.8
Parc LaSalle	2,145	0.6
Cloutier Drive	320	0.8
TOTAL	5,850	3.8

== Architecture and points of interest ==
Attractions and points of interest in St. Norbert include:

- Duff Roblin Provincial Park
- La Barrière Park
- Place Saint-Norbert
- Southwood Golf & Country Club - rotating host of the Manitoba Open
- St. Norbert Farmers' Market — Manitoba’s largest open-air market
- St. Norbert Provincial Heritage Park
- St. Norbert Arts Centre
- Trappist Monastery Provincial Park

=== Asile Ritchot ===
Asile Ritchot
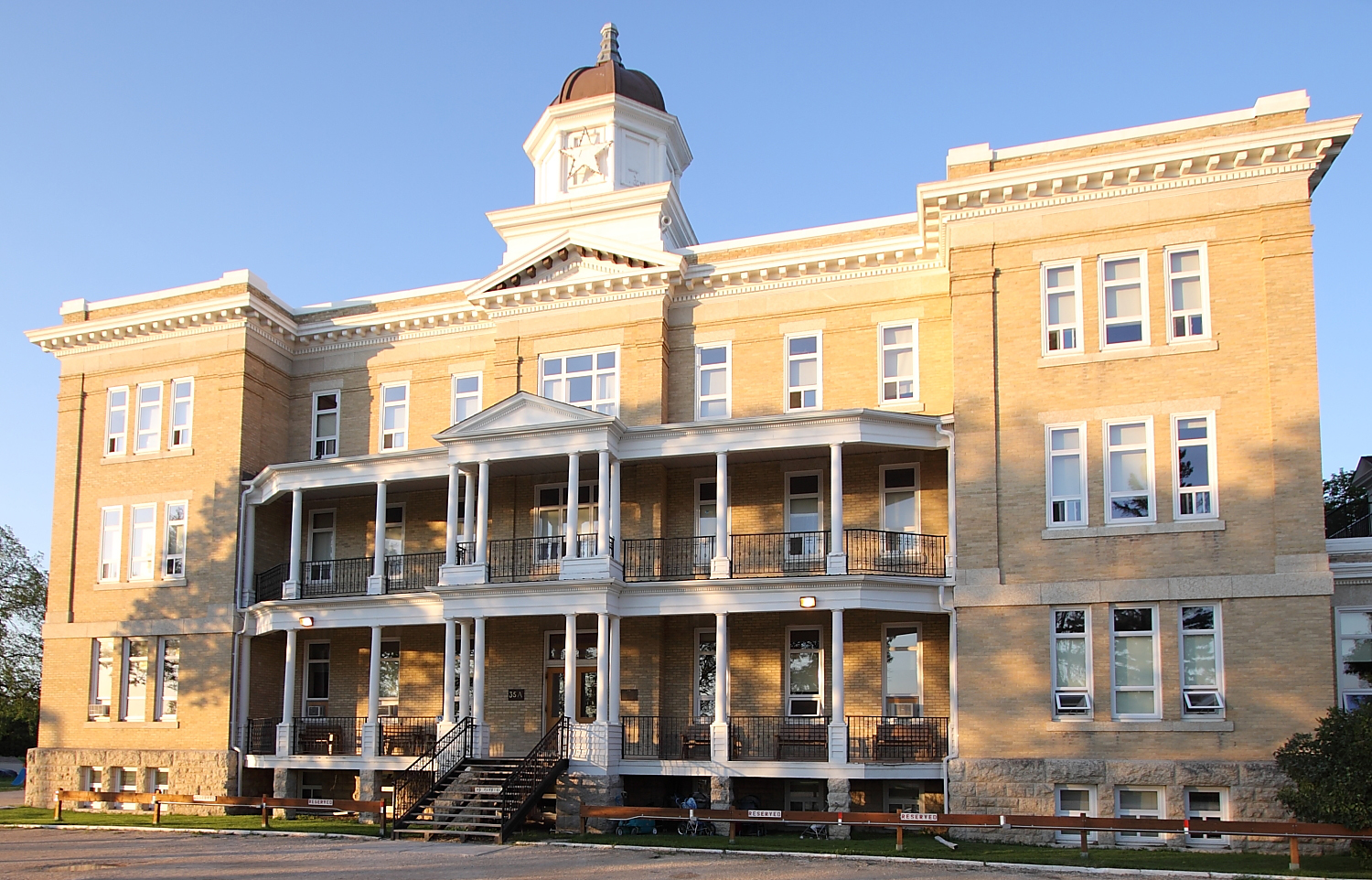
- Alternative names: Ritchot Orphanage; Behavioral Health Foundation building

General information
- Architectural style: Classical Revival
- Location: 35 Avenue de la Digue, Winnipeg, MB
- Coordinates: 49.77°N 97.15°W
- Current tenants: Behavioural Health Foundation
- Completed: 1870s; 1903 (southwing); 1911 (northwing)

Renovating team
- Architect: Joseph-Azarie Senecal (1911)

Visible from Pembina Highway, one of the most recognizable landmarks in St. Norbert is the Asile Ritchot, a large three-story building marked by a huge centre dome. Begun in the 1870s, the first building on the site was the home of politician and businessman Monsieur Joseph Lemay. The building eventually came into the possession of the local church, and in 1903, Father Noël-Joseph Ritchot arranged the donation of the building and 80 acres (320,000 m^{2}) of surrounding land to les Soeurs de Misericorde (Sisters of Mercy). The Sisters called the building Asile Ritchot and operated an orphanage there from 1904 to 1948. In 1911, a large expansion was begun. The new brick building was three stories tall, and featured the landmark centre dome.

When Asile Ritchot closed its doors in 1948, the building was taken over by the Oblate Fathers, and used as a seminary. In 1970, the X-Kalay Foundation (now called the Behavioral Health Foundation) took over the building and currently operates a successful halfway house for the support and rehabilitation of individuals with drug or alcohol issues.

=== Trappist monastery ===
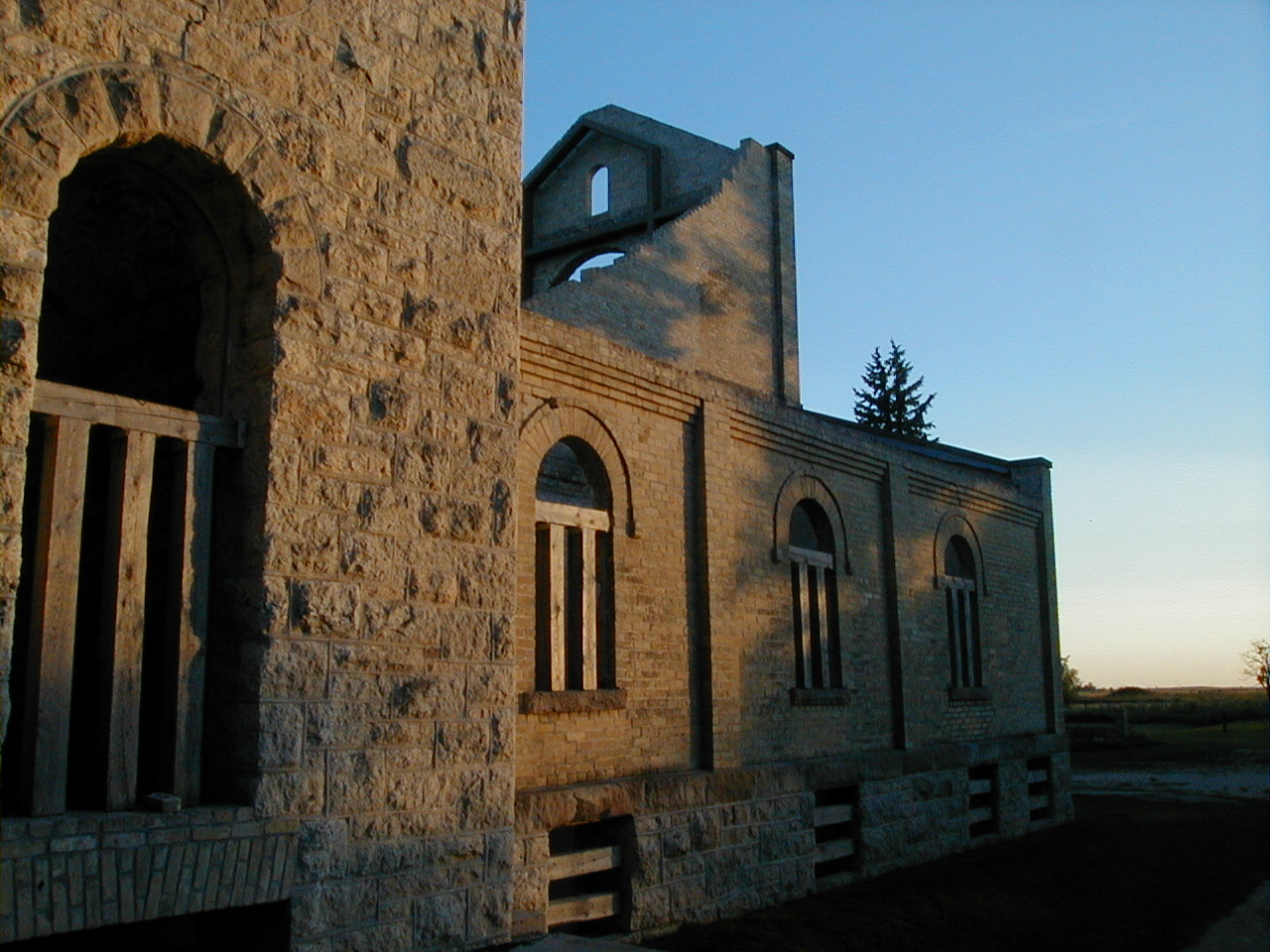
St. Norbert Trappist monastery ruins.

Another architectural landmark in St. Norbert is the former Trappist monastery, now an arts and cultural centre. In 1891, the Abbot of Bellefontaine in France agreed to establish a Trappist monastery on a secluded piece of parish land along the La Salle River, and monks arrived in St. Norbert in 1892. The order was dedicated to a life of prayer and hard work, following the basic tenets of St. Benedict – charity, obedience, and humility. The monks succeeded in building a large and prosperous agricultural operation complete with a sawmill, forge, apiary, cheese house, bakery and greenhouses. Between 30 and 45 monks inhabited the monastery at any given time. By 1975, St. Norbert had become a much more urban area, and the Trappist monks relocated to a more protected and rural location in Holland, Manitoba. In 1983, vandals set fire to the vacant chapel and monastery, reducing the historic buildings to shells. The guesthouse, located some distance away, remained untouched. In 1988, the Province of Manitoba designated the location a provincial historic site. The guesthouse became the home of the St. Norbert Arts Centre in 1991.

In 2002, the provincial government announced the creation of the two-hectare Trappist Monastery Provincial Park, preserving the historic ruins and preventing future commercial development on the site.

=== St. Norbert Catholic Parish ===
St. Norbert Catholic Parish
- St. Norbert Roman Catholic Church
- Paroisse Catholique Saint-Norbert
- St. Norbert Catholic Parish
- 49.77°N 97.14°W
- Location: 70 rue St-Pierre, Winnipeg, MB
- Denomination: Roman Catholic
- Website: stnorbertparish.ca

History
- Consecrated: 1887

Architecture
- Completed: November 30, 1857 (first church); 1883-1885; 1937

Clergy
- Priest: Charles Fillion

The St. Norbert Catholic Parish (French: Paroisse Catholique Saint-Norbert) is a Roman Catholic church in St. Norbert.

The first church was built on the current site in 1857, and was made of logs. The newer building that replaced it in 1883 burned down in 1929. The current church was completed in 1937. The building has twin towers, and houses the body of Father Joseph Noël Ritchot, St. Norbert’s parish priest from 1862 to 1905. Father Ritchot was a supporter of the Métis people, and of Louis Riel. Richot was a member of a delegation that travelled to Ottawa to meet with representatives of the Canadian government regarding the 1870 transfer of land in the Red River Settlement from the Hudson’s Bay Company to the Dominion of Canada.

Across from the church is the tiny open-air Chapel of Our Lady of Good Help (la Chapelle de Notre-Dame-du-Bon-Secours). Ritchot and his parishioners built the chapel in 1875, to commemorate the success of the Métis resistance of 1869–70. That dispute, eventually settled through negotiation, resulted in the inclusion of Métis land, language, and school rights in The Manitoba Act of 1870, the basis of the Red River Settlement’s entry into Confederation. In 1989, the chapel was declared a Manitoba provincial heritage site.

== People ==
- René Ernest Marie Francois, farmer, manager then expert surveyor, born May 28, 1844 in Saint-Martin-du-Bois (Maine-et-Loire, France) and died around 1904, went into exile in Saint-Norbert, Winnipeg, Manitoba, Canada (death certificate of his daughter Marthe). His wife, Adèle Marie Françoise Anna née Chopin (1852-1927) did not follow her husband to Canada, and settled at Le Lion-d'Angers, at "La Rochette", property of Guy-Henri Chopin and Adèle Elise née Francois (1823-1909).
