= TSCC =

TSCC may refer to:

- Technical Support Call Center
- Terminator: The Sarah Connor Chronicles
- Twin Swirl Combustion Chamber, a feature of some Suzuki motorcycles such as the Suzuki GSX series
- Toronto Standard Condominium Corporation
