= Waverley Heights =

- Neighbourhood
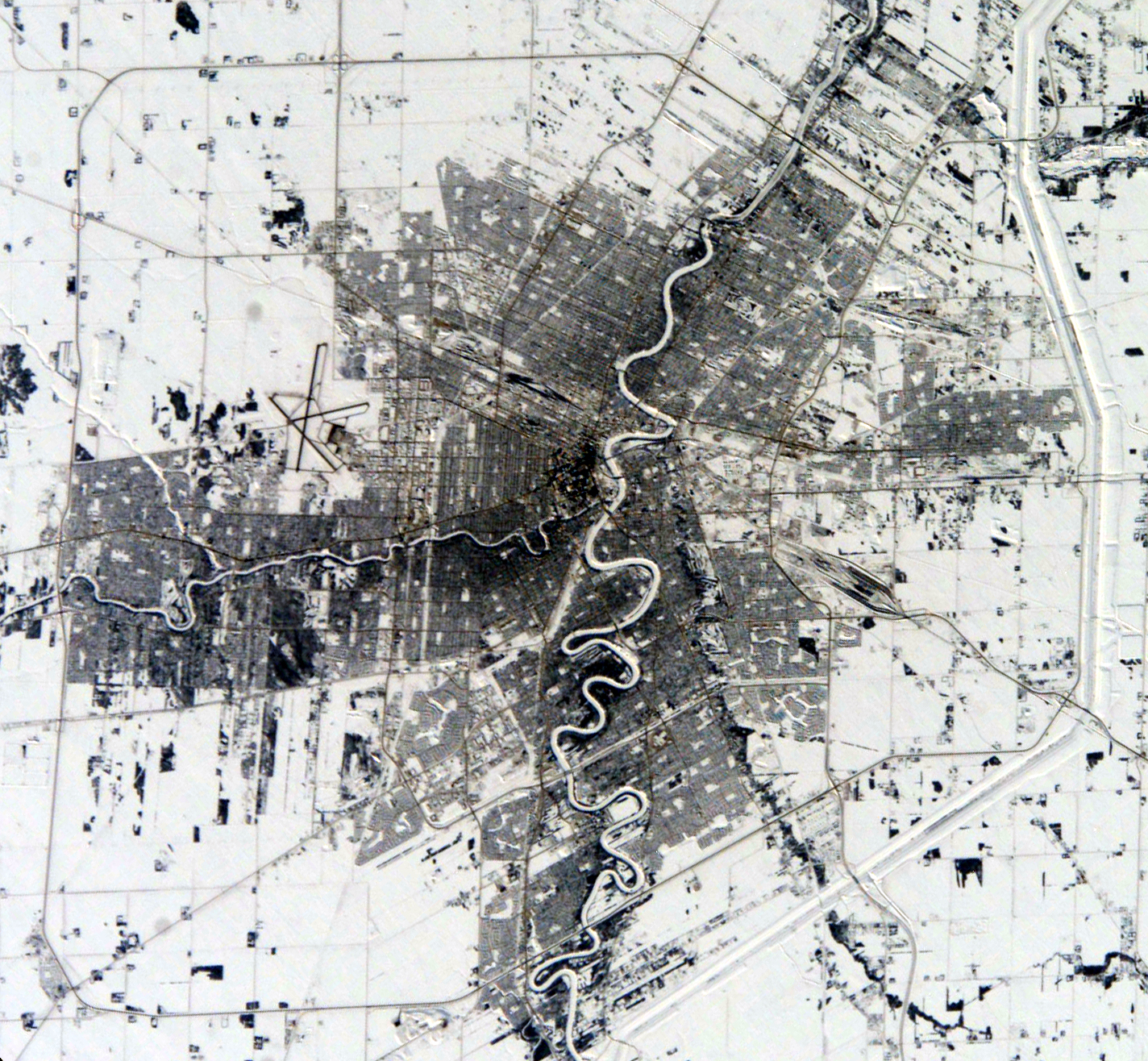
- Location within Winnipeg
- Coordinates: 49.810°N 97.169°W
- Country: Canada
- Province: Manitoba
- City: Winnipeg
- First settled: 1974

Government
  - MP: Terry Duguid (Winnipeg South)
  - MLA: David Pankratz (Waverley)
  - Councillor: Janice Lukes (Waverley West)

Area
  - Total: 2.0 km^{2} (0.77 sq mi)
- Elevation: 232 m (761 ft)

Population (2016)
  - Total: 5,180
  - Density: 2,600/km^{2} (6,700/sq mi)
- Time zone: UTC-6
- Postal code: R3T
- Area codes: Area codes 204 and 431

Waverley Heights is a neighbourhood in the Waverley West ward of Winnipeg, Manitoba, Canada.

It is bordered on the north by Abinojii Mikanah, on the west by Waverley Street, on the south by Bison Drive, and on the east by Pembina Highway. Waverley Heights occupies approximately 2.0 square kilometres (0.8 sq. mi). Most of the dwellings are single-detached, with approximately 40% being semi-detached, row, or apartment style dwellings.

The population of Waverley Heights was 5,180 in 2016. The first homes in Waverley Heights were built in 1974 and the last home was built in 2001.

== Amenities ==
The Waverley Heights Community Center provides recreation services to the Waverley Heights neighborhood. It also provides services to the Richmond West area to the south and to the region between the University of Manitoba and Bishop Grandin.

Waverley Heights is a part of the Pembina Trails School Division, and has two elementary schools—Chancellor School and Bonneycastle School—and one Junior High School—Arthur A. Leach Junior High School.

== Political representation ==
Waverley Heights is currently represented in the provincial legislature through the Waverley electoral district, but once belonged to the St. Norbert district. Federally, it is a part of the Winnipeg South riding and is represented in Canadian Parliament by Terry Duguid.
