= Waverley West =

Waverly West
- Suburb
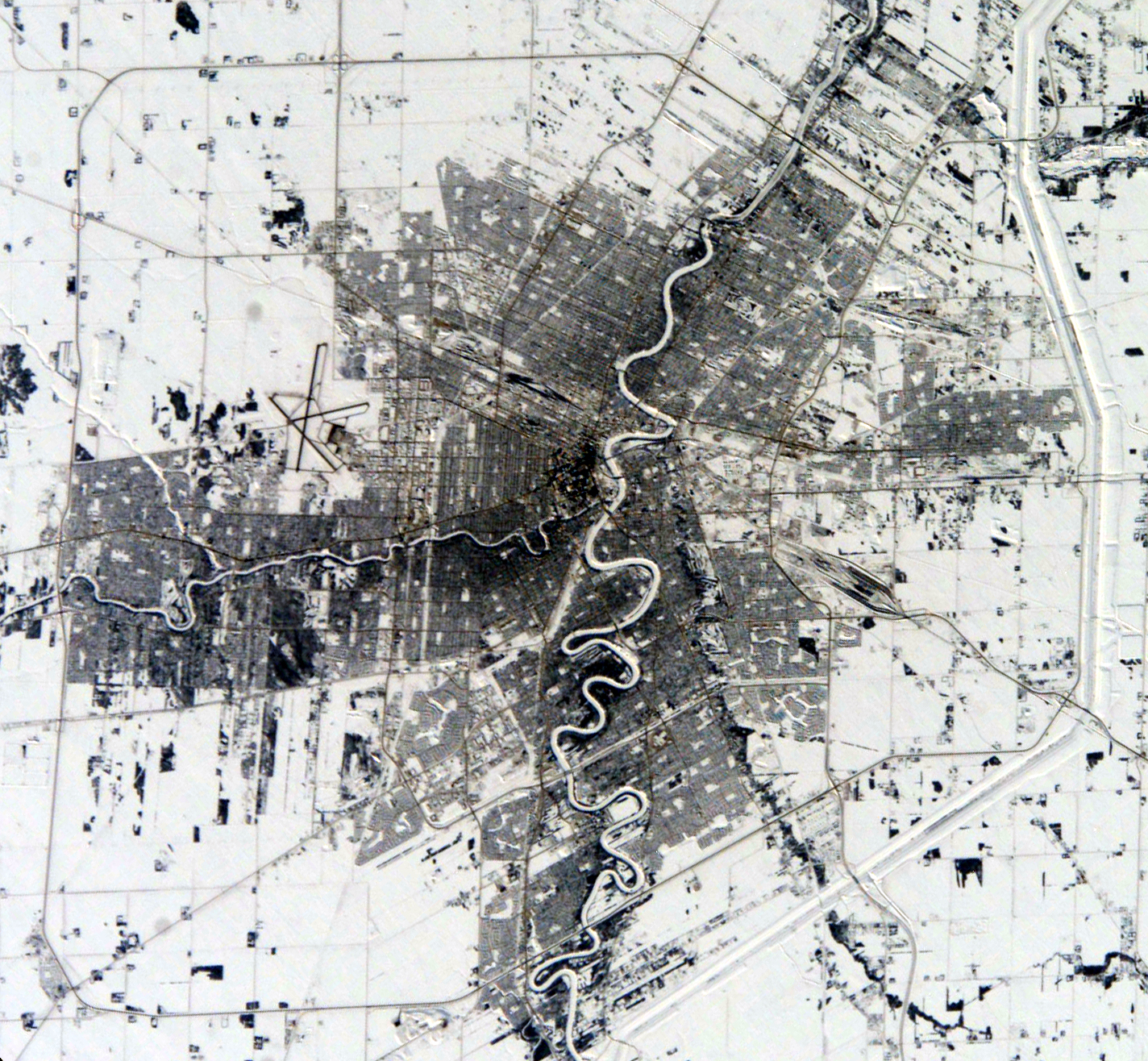
- Location within Winnipeg
- Coordinates: 49.788°N 97.191°W
- Country: Canada
- Province: Manitoba
- City: Winnipeg
- Established: 2005

Government
  - Councillor: Janice Lukes

Population (2016)
  - Total: 43,575

Waverley West is a city ward and suburb in southwest Winnipeg, Manitoba.

The area was approved by the Government of Manitoba in 2005, and is scheduled to be constructed over a 20-year period. With a projected population of 40 000 in 2009, the suburb, were it to be a separate city, would be the third-largest city in the province.

The ward falls into the broader Fort Garry area of Winnipeg.

== Neighbourhoods and amenities ==
The areas/neighbourhoods of the Waverley West city ward are:

- Bison Run (formerly Waverley West B) — Following over 6 years of planning, this new development was named Bison Run in June 2021 and is projected to take between 20–25 years to complete. The first phase of development is to include multi-family townhomes, condominiums, apartments, and single-family homes, followed by commercial development and a pedestrian plaza. New schools such as Pembina Trails Collegiate and Bison Run are built in the community.
- Bridgwater — The residential development of Bridgwater is a network of connected neighbourhoods in Waverley West. The area is named for Arthur Bridgwater (1910-1976), Chief of Police for the Rural Municipality of Fort Garry. For schooling, the area's catchment includes Whyte Ridge Elementary and Ecole Bonnycastle School for K-4; Arthur A Leach Junior High, Henry G. Izatt, and Viscount Alexander for middle school; and Fort Richmond Collegiate and Vincent Massey Collegiate for high school. It includes:
  - Bridgwater Centre — the hub of the area; housing mostly consists of condos and attached townhouses. Commercial development in this neighbourhood began with the construction of the Red River Co-op in early 2015, subsequently followed by Save-On-Foods and a Liquor Mart.
  - Bridgwater Forest — the first residential neighbourhood in the area to be developed.
  - Bridgwater Lakes
  - Bridgwater Trails
- Fairfield Park
- Prairie Pointe
- Richmond West
- South Pointe
- South Pointe West
- Waverley Heights
- West Fort Garry Industrial
- Whyte Ridge

A $69.7-million arterial road in Waverley West was completed in 2014 and included an extension of Kenaston Boulevard.
