= Condominium =

Form of ownership of real property

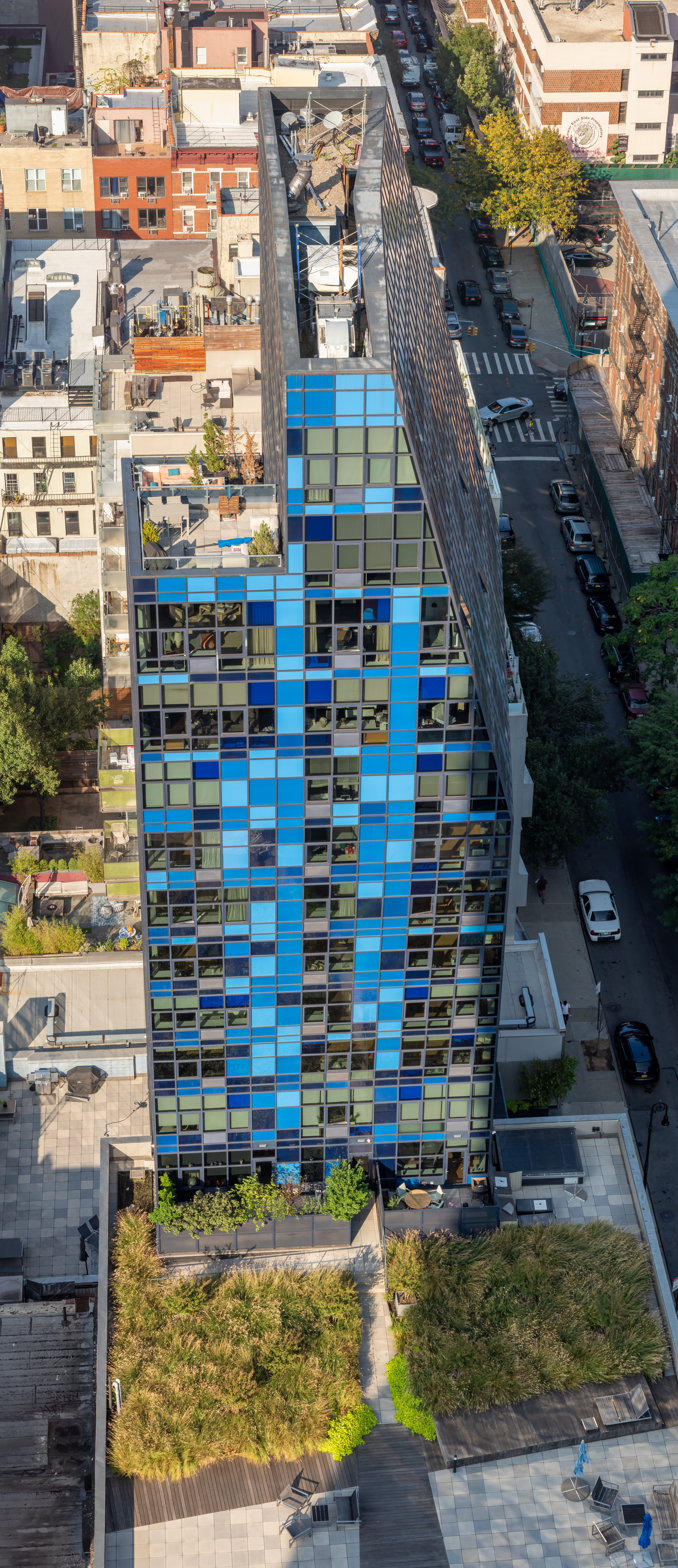
Blue Condominium on the Lower East Side of Manhattan

A condominium (or condo for short) is an ownership regime in which a building (or group of buildings) is divided into multiple units that are either each separately owned, or owned in common with exclusive rights of occupation by individual owners.

In condominium ownership, individually owned units are surrounded by common areas that are jointly owned and managed by the owners of the units. The term can be applied to the building or complex itself, and is sometimes applied to individual units. The term "condominium" is mostly used in the US and Canada, but similar arrangements are used in many other countries under different names.

Condominiums are also sometimes referred to as horizontal property regimes (HPRs) or horizontal divisions. There are also rowhouse style condominiums, in which the units open directly to the outside and are not stacked. Alternatively, detached condominiums look like single-family homes, but the yards (gardens), building exteriors, and streets, as well as any recreational facilities (such as a pool, bowling alley, tennis courts, and golf course), are jointly owned and maintained by a community association. Many shopping malls are commercial condominiums in which the individual retail and office spaces are owned by the businesses that occupy them, while the common areas of the mall are collectively owned by all the business entities that own the individual spaces.

In certain regions the term "apartments" is used to refer to owned or rented units. In other countries, apartments refers specifically to units that are leased by tenants, whereas condominium refers to units that are owned outright, and where the owners of the individual units also collectively own the common areas of the property. These may include the exterior of the building, roof, corridors/hallways, walkways, and laundry rooms, as well as common utilities and amenities, such as the HVAC system and elevators.

In other property regimes, such as those in Hong Kong and Finland, the entire buildings are owned in common with exclusive rights to occupy units assigned to the individual owners. The common areas, amenities, and utilities are managed collectively by the owners through their association, such as a homeowner association or its equivalent.

== History ==
Scholars have traced the earliest known use of the condominium form of tenure to a document from first-century Babylon. The word condominium originated in Latin.

== Etymology ==
Condominium is an invented Latin word formed by adding the prefix con- 'together' to the word dominium 'dominion, ownership'. Its meaning is, therefore, 'joint dominion' or 'co-ownership'.

Condominia (the Latin plural of condominium) originally referred to territories over which two or more sovereign powers shared joint sovereignty. This technique was frequently used to settle border disputes when multiple claimants could not agree on how to partition the disputed territory. For example, from 1818 to 1846, Oregon Country was a condominium over which both the United States and Great Britain shared joint sovereignty until the Oregon Treaty resolved the issue by splitting the territory along the 49th parallel and each country gaining sole sovereignty of one side.

== Overview ==
The distinction between a complex of residences, such as an apartment building, and a condominium is legal, rather than architectural. There is no way to differentiate a condominium from any other residential building simply by looking at it or visiting it. What defines a condominium is the form of ownership. Identical buildings might be marketed either as condominiums (by the developer selling the individual units) or apartments (by the developer retaining ownership and renting the units). Moreover, a developer may sell some units and retain and rent others, and the owners of condominium units often rent them to tenants as what amount to apartments, meaning the distinction is not ironclad. Indeed, it is possible to convert an apartment building into condominiums (for example through a Right to Buy program) or vice versa (by one owner buying out all units in a building).

Where a condominium is in essence an apartment building, as a practical matter, builders tend to build condominiums to higher quality standards than apartment complexes because of the differences between the rental and sale markets. They are typically slightly larger than apartments and are often constructed in a townhouse style in regions where single-family detached homes are common.

A condominium is a form of real property ownership in which each owner holds title to an individual unit, along with an undivided ownership interest in the common elements of the development, such as the land, structural components, and shared facilities. The boundaries of each unit are defined by the condominium declaration (sometimes called a master deed) and applicable state law. The boundaries typically consist of a space bounded by floors, walls, and ceilings, although the precise boundaries may vary by jurisdiction and in accord with the governing documents. A condominium owners' association administers, maintains, and manages the common elements on behalf of the owners, but whether the association itself holds title to any property depends upon the applicable state law and the condominium's governing documents. In the classic condominium model, common elements are owned by the unit owners as undivided tenants in common, not by the association itself.

Some condominium complexes consist of single-family dwellings. There are also "detached condominiums" where homeowners do not maintain the exteriors of the dwellings or yards, and "site condominiums", where the owner has more control and possibly ownership (as in a "whole lot" or "lot line" condominium) over the exterior appearance. These structures are preferred by some planned neighborhoods and gated communities.

== Founding documents and bylaws ==
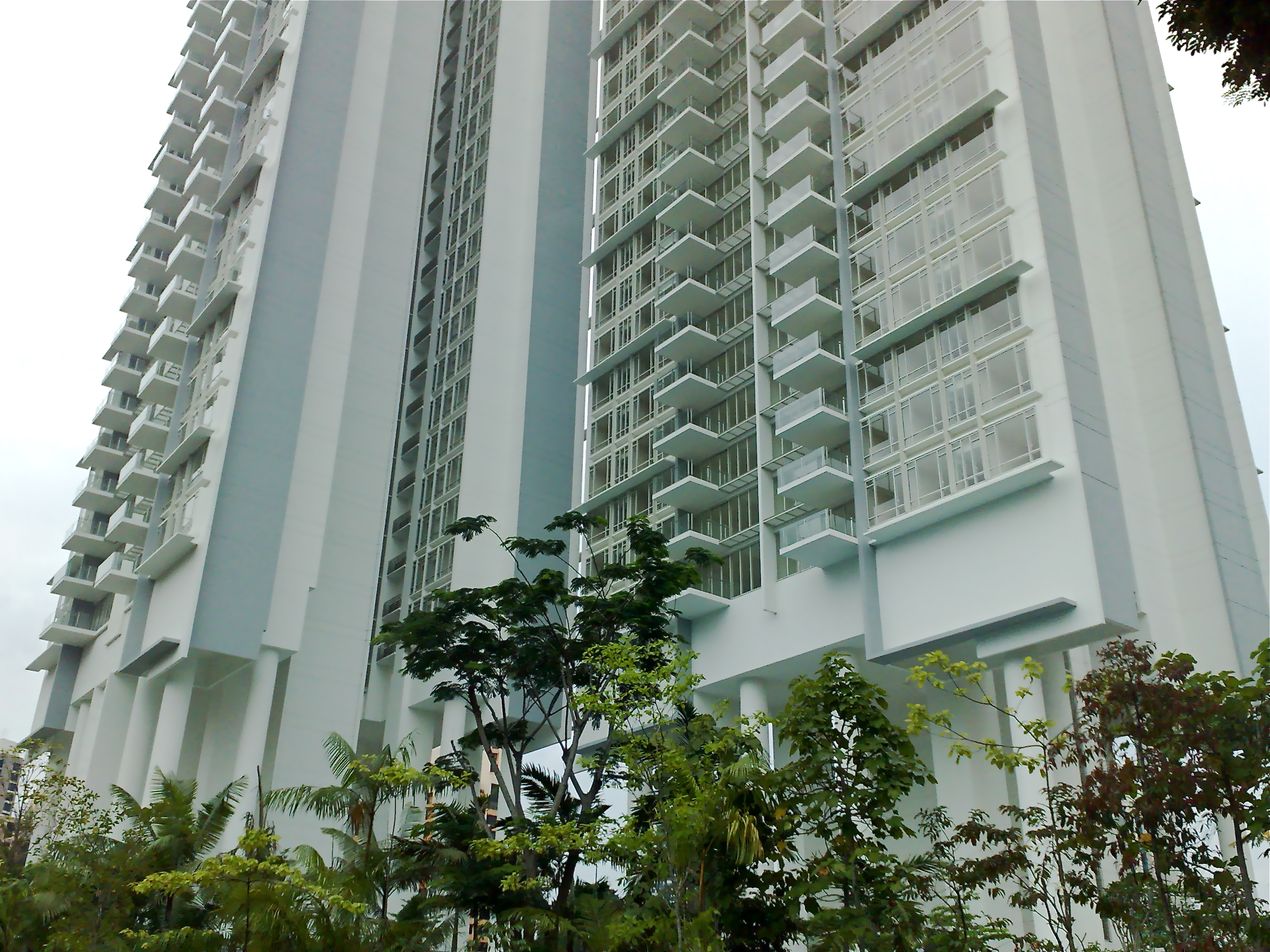
The Cosmopolitan, a condominium in Singapore

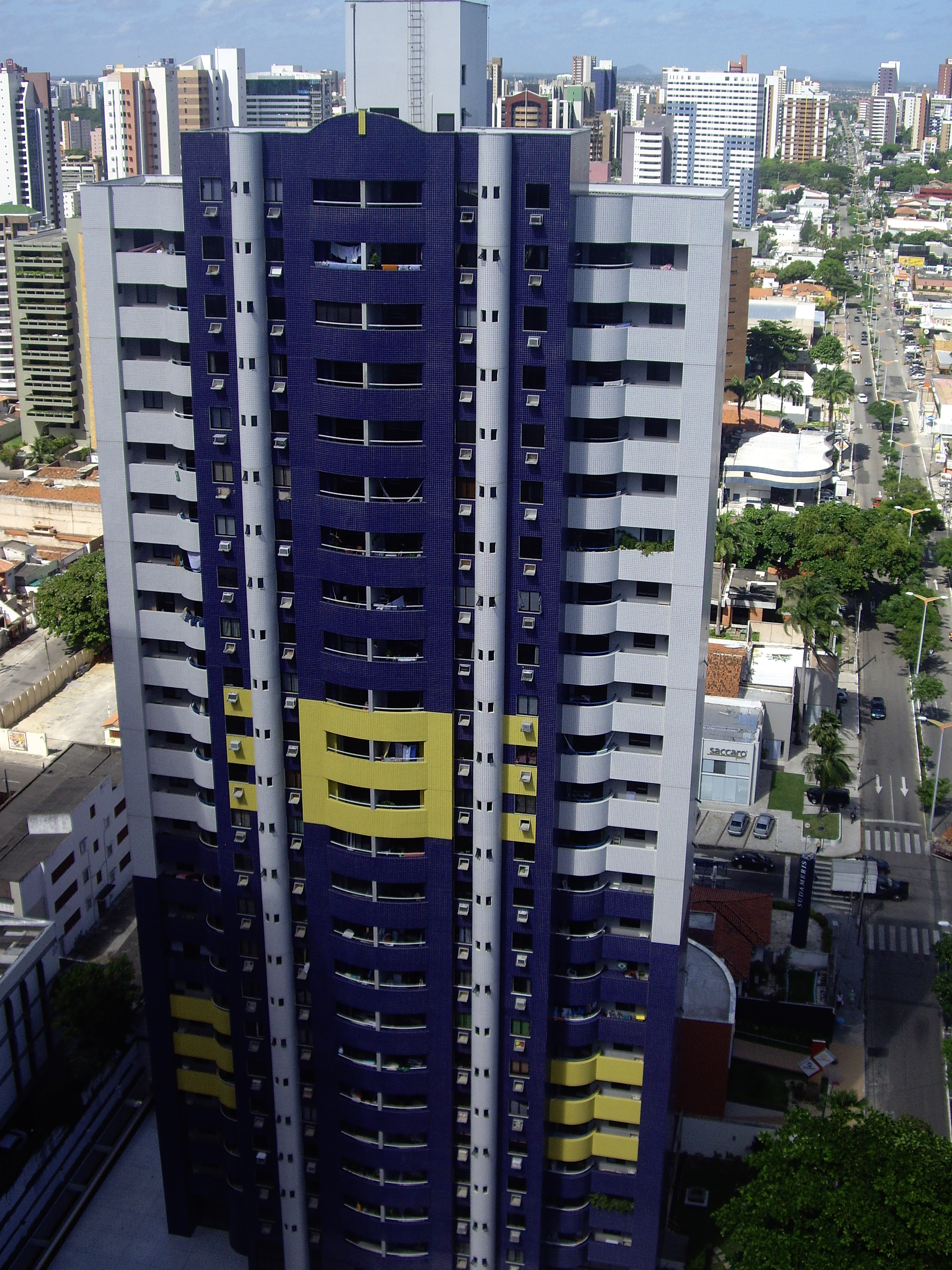
Condominium in Fortaleza, Brazil

The description of the condominium units and the common areas and any restrictions on their use are established in a founding document, which may variously be called a "Master Deed", "Enabling Declaration", "Declaration of Conditions", "Conditions, Covenants, and Restrictions (CC&Rs)", "Deed of Mutual Covenant" or simply a "Condominium Document". Among other things, this document can provide for the creation of a governing body or corporation, for example, a Homeowner's Association in the United States.

Rules for the association may be in the master deed, or could be a separate set of bylaws governing the internal affairs of the condominium. Matters addressed in the condominium bylaws may include the responsibilities of the owners' association, voting procedures to be used at association meetings, the qualifications, powers, and duties of the board of directors, and the powers and duties of the officers. The Bylaws may also cover the obligations of the owners with regard to assessments, maintenance, and use of the units and common areas, although those obligations are often found in the condominium's founding documents. Finally, they may set limits on the conduct of unit owners and residents. These are more readily amendable than the declaration or association bylaws, typically requiring only a vote of the governing body.

Typical rules include mandatory maintenance fees (perhaps collected monthly), pet restrictions, and color/design choices visible from the exterior of the units. Generally, these sets of rules and regulations are made available to residents and or as a matter of public record, via a condominium or homeowners association website, or through public files, depending on the state and its applicable laws. Condominiums are usually owned in fee simple title, but can be owned in ways that other real estate can be owned, such as title held in trust. In some jurisdictions, such as Ontario, Canada, or Hawaii US, there are "leasehold condominiums" where the development is built on leased land.

As condominium unit owners may wish to rent their home to tenants, similar to renting out single-owner real estate, but leasing rights may be subject to conditions or restrictions set forth in the declaration (such as a rental cap for the total number of units in a community that can be leased at one time) or otherwise as permitted by local law.

== Homeowners association ==
A homeowners association (HOA), whose members are the unit owners, manages the condominium through a board of directors elected by the membership. This exists under various names depending on the jurisdiction, such as "unit title", "sectional title", "commonhold", "strata council", or "tenant-owner's association", "body corporate", "Owners Corporation", "condominium corporation" or "condominium association". Another variation of this concept is the "time share", although not all time shares are condominiums, and not all time shares involve actual ownership of (i.e., deeded title to) real property. Condominiums may be found in both civil law and common law legal systems as it is purely a creation of statute. Among other things, the HOA assesses unit owners for the costs of maintaining the common areas, etc. That is, the HOA decides how much each owner should pay and has the legal power to collect that.

== Non-residential uses ==
Condominium ownership is also used, albeit less frequently, for non-residential land uses: offices, hotel rooms, retail shops, private airports, marinas, group housing facilities (retirement homes or dormitories), bare land (in British Columbia) and storage. The legal structure is the same, and many of the benefits are similar; for instance, a nonprofit corporation may face a lower tax liability in an office condominium than in an office rented from a taxable, for-profit company. However, the frequent turnover of commercial land uses in particular can make the inflexibility of condominium arrangements problematic.

== By country ==
=== Australia ===
In Australia, condominiums are known as "strata title schemes" or "community title schemes".

=== Canada ===
The 2011 National Household Survey (NHS) showed that one in eight Canadian households lived in condominium dwellings, colloquially known as "condos", mostly located in a few censuses metropolitan areas according to Statistics Canada. Condominiums exist in most parts of Canada, though they are more common in larger cities. They are regulated under provincial or territorial legislation, and specific legal details vary from jurisdiction to jurisdiction. In most parts of Canada, they are referred to as condominiums, except in British Columbia, where they are referred to as a strata, and in Quebec, where they are referred to as syndicates of co-ownership.

The townhouse complex of Brentwood Village in Edmonton, Alberta, was the first condominium development in Canada (registered in 1967). With regular condominiums, the unit owner usually owns the internal unit space and a share of the corporation; the corporation owns the exterior of the building land and common area; in the case of a freehold condominium the owner owns the land and building and the corporation owns common shared roadways and amenities. The Canadian Condominium Institute is a non-profit association of condominium owners and corporations with chapters in each province and territory. The Condo Owners Association COA Ontario is a non-profit association representing condominium owners with divisions across the province and districts within the various municipalities.

=== Denmark ===
Apartments (Danish ejerlejlighed, literally "owner-apartment") comprise some 5% of Danish homes. They are traded and mortgaged on the same markets as freestanding houses, and are treated legally much like other forms of real estate. Each owner-tenant directly owns their own apartment; the rest of the building and the ground on which it stands is owned jointly by the apartment owners, who execute their joint ownership through an owner's association. The expenses of maintaining the joint property are shared pro rata among the owners.

Another 5% of Danish homes are in housing cooperatives (Danish andelsbolig), which occupy a legal position intermediate between condominiums and housing associations. The entire property is legally owned by a non-profit corporation, in which the tenants own shares; each share carries the right and duty to lease an apartment from the cooperative. Shares can be bought and sold, but often the cooperative's rules strictly limit the price for which they may change hands. (In contrast, condominiums are traded on a free market). Because the official share prices are often lower than the market value and sellers often retain the freedom to select whom to sell to, under-the-table payments occur.

Current public policy favors condominiums over housing cooperatives, and recent legislation has aimed at making the latter more condominium-like. For example, since 2005, cooperative shares may be used to secure bank loans. (However, Danish mortgage banks still may not mortgage individual housing cooperative apartments.)

=== England and Wales ===
In England and Wales, one of the equivalent legal structures of a condominium is commonhold, a form of ownership introduced in September 2004. As of 3 June 2009, there were 12 commonhold residential developments comprising 97 units in England and one commonhold residential development, comprising 30 units, in Wales. "Condominium" is not a term that is widely used in England and Wales. Commonhold is a creature of statute and comparatively rare, and condominiums are more likely to be found in the form of leaseholds because of long-standing legal differences between leasehold and freehold tenure.

By virtue of the landmark case of Tulk v Moxhay, in English law only restrictive covenants can be enforced against freehold land. This means it is not possible to enforce a positive covenant on successive owners of freehold land, other than to maintain a boundary fence, without creating an elaborate trust. A positive covenant is, broadly, one that involves the expenditure of money to perform.

This did not create a significant problem until the 1950s when flats (where ownership is divided horizontally) first began to appear on the market as more affordable, particularly for first-time buyers. Until then flats had been confined to short-term unsaleable tenancies, with varying degrees of statutory rent protection and security of tenure.

It was soon learned that freehold flats were an unsatisfactory form of ownership because it was not possible to impose essential maintenance requirements. As such, flats became virtually unmarketable because they were an unacceptable form of security to lenders. Thus solicitors, the principal property lawyers in England and Wales in those days, began to use leases instead, where such limitations did not apply.

Progress was haphazard and piecemeal, but over time things became more standard. Improvements became universal as institutional lenders refused to advance money on the security of flats unless certain basic provisions were included. This benefited owners whether or not they borrowed money since the purchase was invariably conducted through a solicitor or licensed conveyancer trained to reject leases failing to meet the necessary standards.

Despite these standards, the actual form of leasehold systems is variable. Highly favoured are arrangements where the leases are granted out of a freehold owned by a corporation, itself owned by individual leaseholders. This provides an opportunity for them to participate in the proper management of the block. Again, the quality of management is very variable.

The statute creating commonholds was motivated by a desire to eliminate some of the problems and perceived injustices, such as the commercial exploitation of lessees by freeholders as their leases began to have too little time left to satisfy lenders. Since most leasehold developments are undertaken by commercial entities, commonholds did not become widespread. There are, however, other statutes in place that give some degree of protection for leaseholders. It is, nevertheless, essential to consider proper legal advice whenever engaged in the purchase of a flat, for the requirements for a fully marketable flat remain complex.

The Law of Property Act 1925, s. 153, contains provisions for the "enlargement" of leases into freeholds, one of the effects of which is to preserve the enforceability of positive covenants contained in the lease against the resulting freehold. There are clear, but stringent, requirements. Artificial schemes using the provisions to create enforceable positive covenants in freehold blocks of flats were occasionally mooted but never gained currency.

On 21 July 2020 the UK Law Commission reported on the existing difficulties and made proposals to improve the law and encourage the acceptance of commonhold as the preferred form of tenure.

=== Finland ===
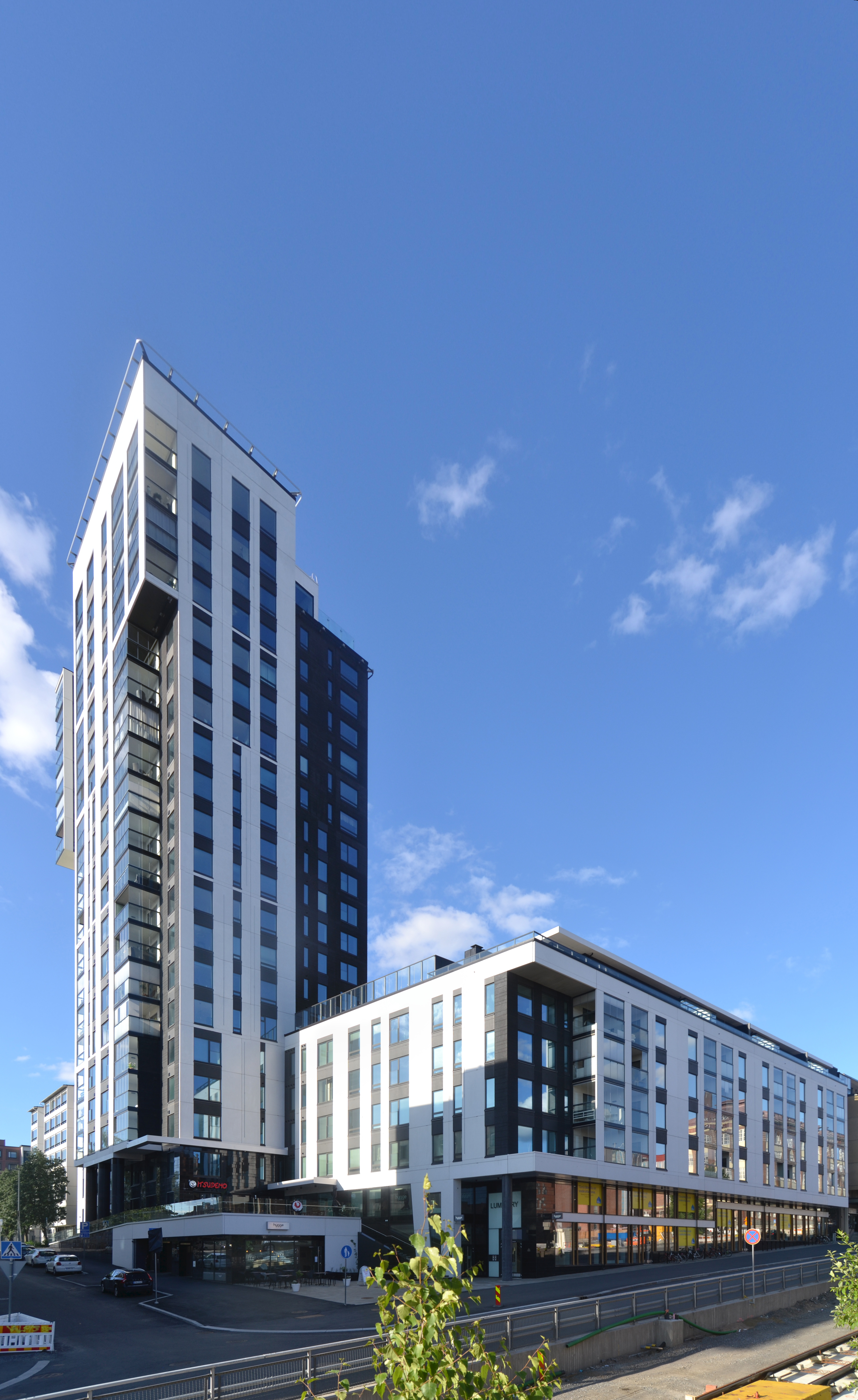
The Luminary, a condominium in Tammela, Tampere, Finland

In Finland, a condominium-like arrangement where the ownership of the real estate is assigned to specific apartments (Finnish: hallinnanjakosopimus, Swedish: avtal om delning av besittningen) is usually used only with detached or semi-detached houses.

A housing cooperative is a common form of home ownership in Finland. Owning shares that correspond to one apartment in a housing company is generally considered as much owning your own home as actually directly owning a (single family) house. However, shares are not considered as real estate but as personal property and the co-op can take possession of the apartment for a term time and evict the tenant or owner because of disturbance or unpaid maintenance fees.

Finnish housing cooperatives are incorporated as (non-profit) limited-liability companies (Finnish: asunto-osakeyhtiö, Swedish: bostadsaktiebolag), where one share usually represents one square meter (sometimes ten) of the apartment.

Membership in a condo is obtained by buying the shares on the open market, most often through a real estate agent. No board approval is needed to buy shares, but in some cases other stockholders or the housing cooperative itself has the right to claim the stocks being sold. There is usually no requirement for the owner(s) to live in the condo. Owning apartments for rent is a common form of saving and private investment in Finland.

=== Germany ===
In Germany, condominiums are known as Eigentumswohnungen (lit. 'ownership dwellings') and the most important law considering condominiums is the Wohnungseigentumsgesetz (abbreviated WoEigG). It is the basis for all legal regulations involving individual freehold ownership, the rights, and duties of homeowner associations, and the management of condominiums.

The WoEigG dates back to 1951, but it was re-enacted in 2007. Now, homeowners are invested with partial legal capacity, which means that the homeowner association represents an entity with rights and duties that may include contracts. The right of ownership is divided in the first article of the WoEigG into homeownership, individual freehold ownership, part ownership, and commonhold ownership.

=== Greece ===
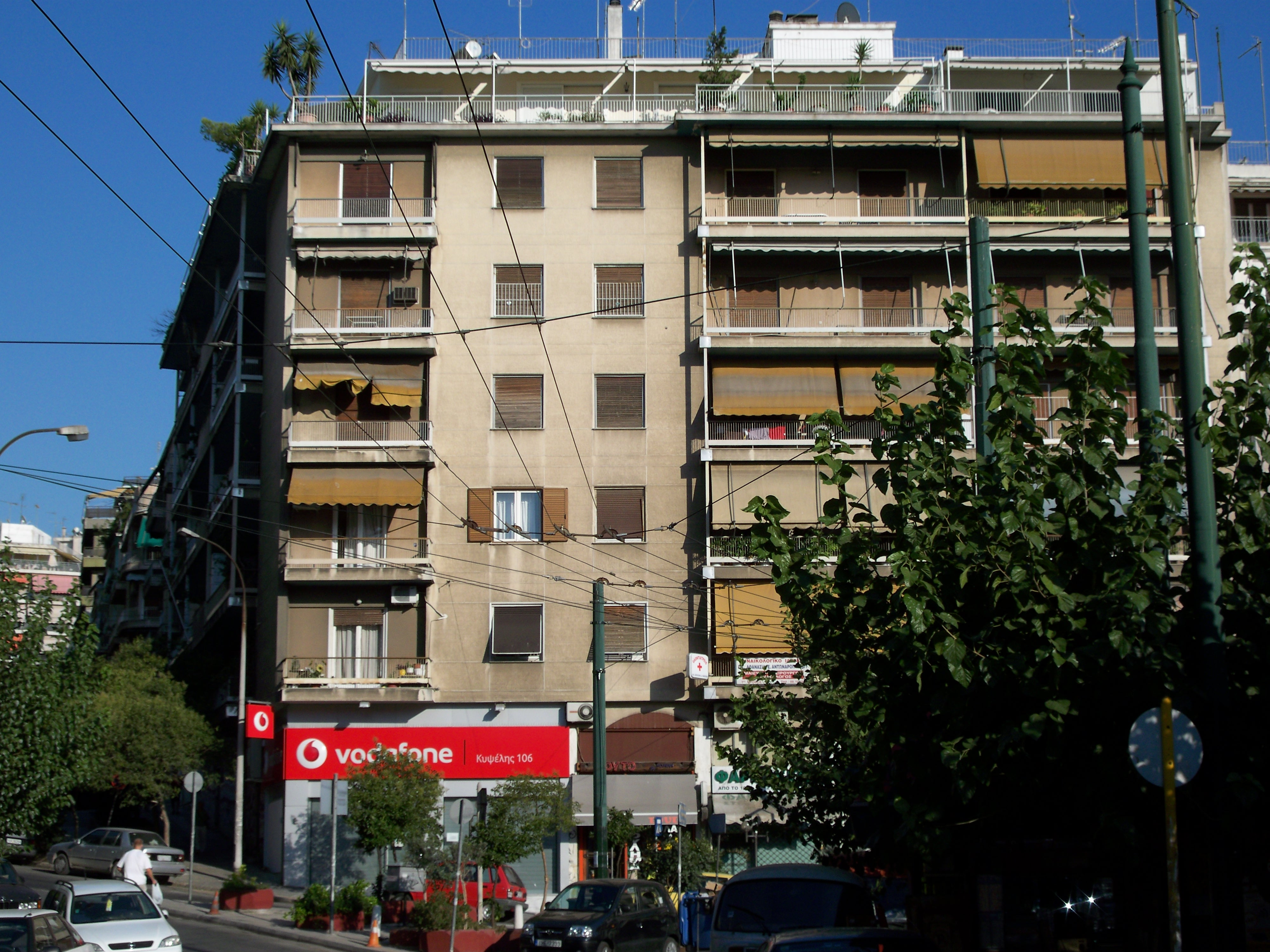
A condominium in Kypseli, Athens, Greece.

In Greece, condominiums became very popular in the 1960s. It is a building one sees everywhere in Greece, since most of its population lives in big cities. They are known as πολυκατοικίες (polykatoikíes), literally "multi-residences".

=== Hong Kong ===
In Hong Kong the equivalent to a condominium is a "multi-owner building" or "building in multiple ownership". These are sometimes part of a private housing estate comprising multiple buildings but often consist of a single building owned in common. The relationships among the parties, including rights of exclusive occupation of flats and parking spaces, are defined by the deed of mutual covenant ("DMC", analogous to the master deed described above) and the Building Management Ordinance Cap. 344.

=== Hungary ===
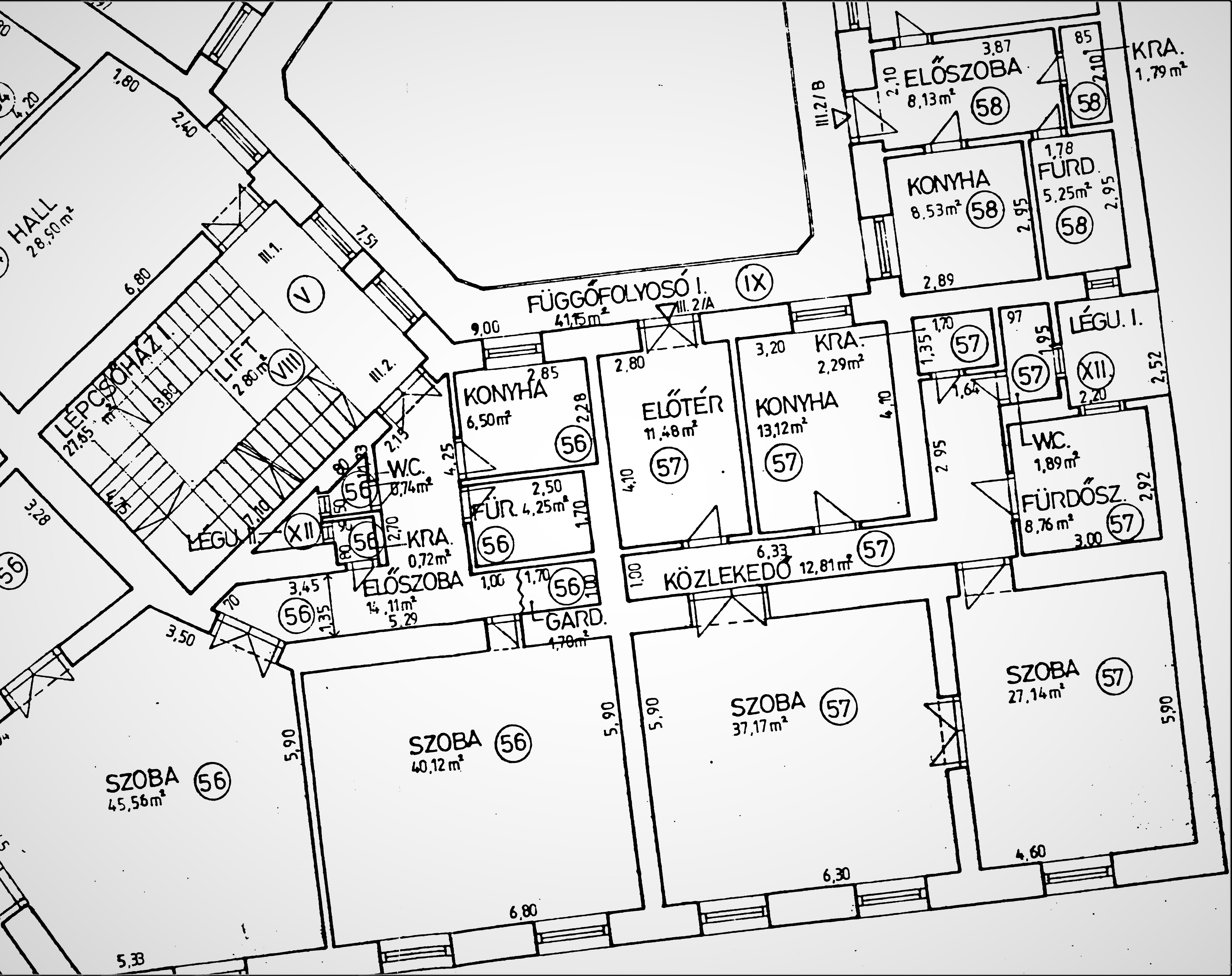
Floor plan of a condo - Andrássy avenue, Budapest

Condominiums are a very common form of real estate ownership in contemporary Hungary, as most state- or municipality-owned apartments were privatized following the end of communism in Hungary in 1989. Historically, condominiums (Hungarian: társasház) were formalized as a legal ownership structure as early as 1924.

Condominiums in Hungary are traded and mortgaged on the same market as any free-standing single-family home (Hungarian: kertesház; "garden-house"), and are treated much like other forms of real estate. The condominium acts as a non-profit legal entity maintaining the common areas of the property, and is managed by a representative (Hungarian: közös képviselő) elected by the owners' convention.

Historically, this representative was one of the owners themselves; in the 21st century, however, the owners' convention typically hires a professional building manager who does not personally live in the building. Decisions that involve changes to the terms and conditions, or larger common expenses, still need to be approved by the convention, however. Voting power is based on the percentage of property owned.

=== India ===
In India, condominiums are known as "Apartments" or "Apartment Buildings/Complexes" or "Societies" or "Flats". Each building consists of multiple floors and flats/living units with different configurations. The most common configurations are "1-BHK", "2-BHK" and "3-BHK" (BHK stands for bedroom-hall-kitchen).

The association of homeowners has many names - two common names are Resident Welfare Association (RWA) and the other being a Co-operative Housing Society (CHS) or Co-operative Group Housing Society (CGHS), which needs to be registered with the municipal authorities.

=== Iran ===
Iranian government has begun supporting villas and opposing apartment building concerned by people's manner.

=== Israel ===
In Israel, condominiums (known "בתים משותפים", "shared houses" or "cooperative houses") are a common form of home ownership. Public housing has historically been organized as subsidized purchases and mortgages in government-constructed condominiums.

=== Italy ===
In Italy, the condominium ("Condominio") is governed by law, last reformed in 2012. Co-ownership of the common parts of the buildings (such as the stairs, main walls, facades, roof, and courtyards) is mandatory: a landlord can not give up the right to common parts for not paying the costs. Each owner's quota in the condominium is expressed in thousandths ("millesimi") of the whole; these are used to determine majorities in owners' assemblies ("assemblee condominiali").

=== The Netherlands ===
See housing cooperative under owners association.

=== Norway ===
Condominiums (Norwegian Eierseksjon) was formally introduced in 1983. Approximately 19% of Norwegian homes are condominiums, as approximately 50% of the owner-occupied flats and duplexes, approximately 30% of the rowhouses, and 2.5% of the detached houses are organized as condominiums.

=== Pakistan ===
The title "Condominiums" is not used in Pakistan rather they are called "Flats" for average-style buildings while "Complexes" for sophisticated and larger buildings. The minimum number of floors for a building to be classified as "Flats" is four, with a requirement for having at least one elevator or lift for buildings upwards of four floors. Almost all have a separate room called the "Drawing Room", used for guest entertainment purposes. However, its use as a TV room and dining room is common. Another unique feature is the balcony or "terrace", which is standard for all flats.

=== Philippines ===
In the Philippines, condominiums are classified into three types: low-rise, mid-rise, and high-rise. Condos have a special type of ownership title called a CCT - condominium certificate of title. Condominiums usually have amenities, like swimming pools, owned parking, a clubhouse, and a building for administration.

=== Russia ===
Initially, the concept of a condominium was introduced by the Federal Law "On the Fundamentals of the Federal Housing Policy" No. 4218-1 dated December 24, 1992: "Condominium is an association of owners of residential premises in apartment buildings with the establishment of conditions for joint ownership and use of inter-apartment stairs, elevators, corridors, roofs, technical basements, non-apartment engineering equipment, adjacent territory, and other common areas.

=== Singapore ===
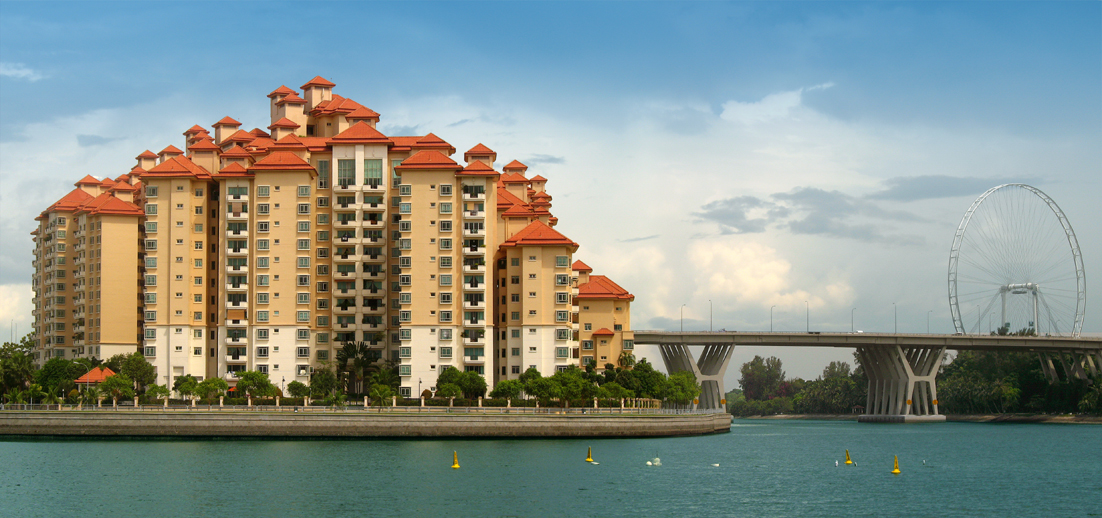
A condominium complex in Singapore next to the Kallang River

In Singapore, "condo" or "condominium" are terms used for private apartment buildings, which generally have features such as security guards and communal sports facilities. This differentiates them from public housing apartment buildings built by the Housing and Development Board (referred to as "HDB flats"), which typically have less extensive facilities.

Condominiums and HDB flats make up the overwhelming majority of available residential housing in the country. As of 2024, 77.4% of households lived in HDB flats, while 17.7% lived in condominiums.

=== South Africa ===
In South Africa, condominiums are known as "Sectional Title" properties and are governed by the Sectional Titles Act No. 95 of 1986. Town-house complexes and many apartment blocks typically have this form of title. The owners of the complex constitute the Body Corporate, and the Body Corporate elects a group of Trustees to manage the day-to-day management of the complex, who often hire a company specialising in complex management, known as a Managing Agent.

=== Spain ===
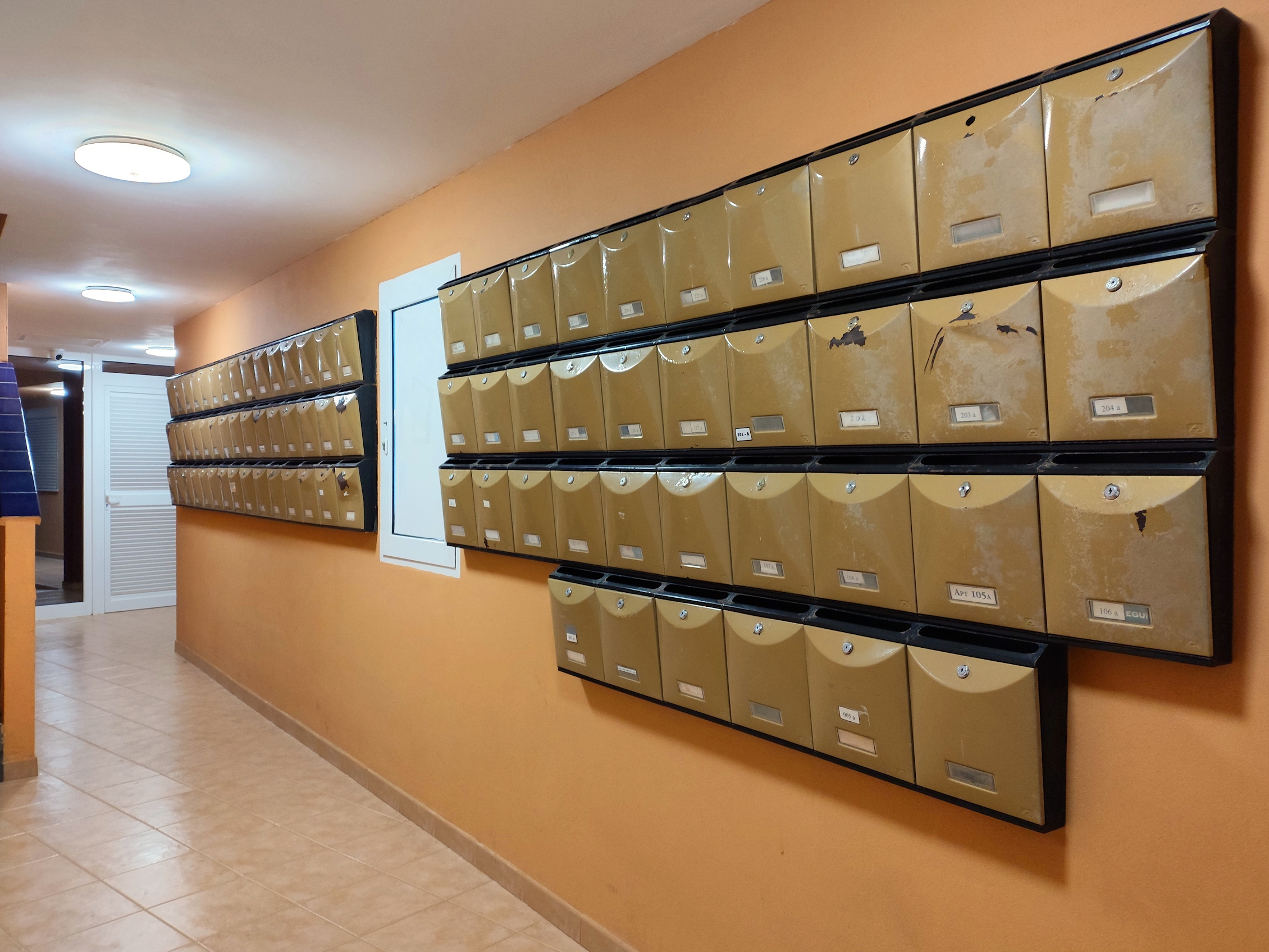
Common area letter boxes in an apartment building in Spain

In Spain, condominiums are known as "comunidad de propietarios" (legal term) and "comunidad de vecinos" (popular term), and are governed by the Ley de Propiedad Horizontal (L.P.H.) which significantly extends the Spanish Civil Code. L.P.H. became the law in 1960 and more than half of the Spanish population live in condominiums. According to INE, there are almost 840,000 condominiums in Spain which comprise around 9 million habitat buildings.

=== Sweden ===
On 1 May 2009, condominiums (ägarlägenheter) became available for the first time under Swedish law. Of the 14,447 newly built apartments completed in 2009, only six were condominiums. A majority of production, 7,723 units, were apartments in housing cooperatives (bostadsrättslägenheter), the traditional form of owner-occupied apartment housing. As of late 2014, there were 955 condominiums total throughout all of Sweden.

=== Thailand ===
Nationwide, as of February 2018, Bangkok represented 58% of Thailand's new construction condominium market while the other provinces accounted for the remaining 42%. The unit type has seen steady growth in the Thai market over the previous decades, in contrast to the declining percentage in the traditional detached house. The condo development trend continues nationwide as dozens of projects are in progress in Bangkok, several others are underway in the Eastern Economic Corridor provinces of Chon Buri and Rayong, and to the west in Phetchaburi and Prachuap Khiri Khan.

=== Vietnam ===
In Vietnam, condominiums have become increasingly popular, especially in urban areas like Hanoi and Ho Chi Minh City. The Law on Residential Housing (No. 65/2014/QH13), effective since July 1, 2015, allows foreigners to purchase condominiums in Vietnam. However, there are restrictions: foreigners can own up to 30% of the apartments in a condominium and a maximum of 250 individual houses within a designated area. The ownership period is limited to 50 years, with an option to extend for another 50 years. This law aims to attract foreign investment while ensuring that the majority of housing remains accessible to Vietnamese citizens.

=== United States ===
The first condominium law passed in the United States was in the Commonwealth of Puerto Rico in 1958. In 1960, the first condominium in the continental U.S. was built in Salt Lake City, Utah. The legal concept had spread to the U.S. from Europe via the Caribbean (Puerto Rico and Cuba) but throughout the 1960s it was widely and erroneously reported that the concept had arisen in the U.S. directly based on a Roman model. In fact, the concept of an estate in the air was antithetical to Roman law, and there is no evidence of an ancient Roman condominio.

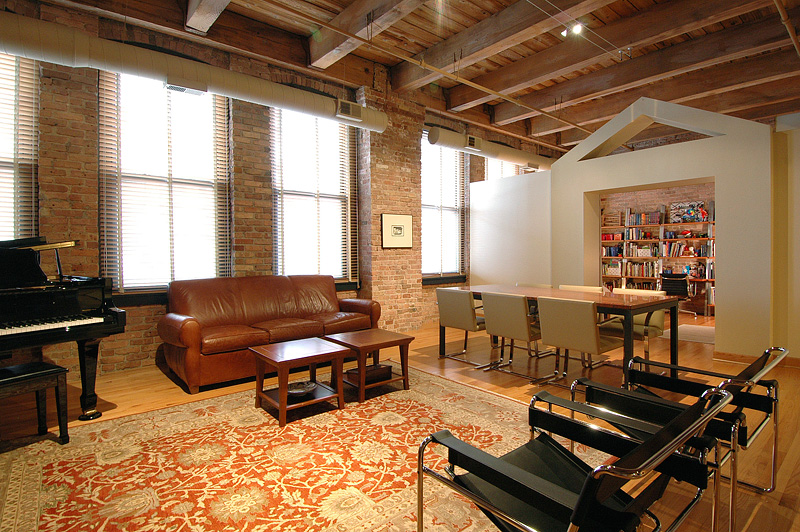
The interior of a loft condominium in Chicago's west side, US

Section 234 of the Housing Act of 1961 allowed the Federal Housing Administration to insure mortgages on condominiums, leading to a vast increase in the funds available for condominiums, and to condominium laws in every state by 1969. Since then, the term 'condominium', or 'condo' for short, has become a household word in the U.S. Many Americans' first widespread awareness of condominium life came not from its largest cities but from South Florida, where developers had imported the condominium concept from Puerto Rico and used it to sell thousands of inexpensive homes to retirees arriving flush with cash from the urban northern U.S.

The primary attraction to this type of ownership is the ability to obtain affordable housing in a highly desirable area that typically is beyond economic reach. Additionally, such properties benefit from having restrictions that maintain and enhance value, providing control over blight that plagues some neighborhoods.

Over the past several decades, the residential condominium industry has been booming in some metropolitan areas, such as Miami, San Francisco, Seattle, Boston, Chicago, Austin, Los Angeles, and New York City. However, in recent years, supply within the condo industry has caught up with demand, and sales have slowed. It is now in a slowdown phase.

An alternative form of ownership, popular in parts of the U.S. but found also in other common law jurisdictions, is housing cooperative, also known as "company share" or "co-op". A Housing Cooperative is where the building has an associated legal company and ownership of shares gives the right to a lease for the residence of a unit. Another form is ground rent (solarium) in which a single landlord retains ownership of the land (solum) but leases the surface rights (superficies) which renew in perpetuity or over a very long term.

In the U.S., there are several different styles of condominium complexes. For example, a garden condominium complex consists of low-rise buildings built with landscaped grounds surrounding them. A townhouse condominium complex consists of multi-floor semi-detached homes. In condominium townhouses, the purchaser owns only the interior, while the building itself is owned by a condominium corporation. The corporation is jointly owned by all the owners and charges them fees for general maintenance and major repairs. Freehold townhouses are exclusively owned, without any condominium aspects. In the U.S., this type of ownership is called fee simple.

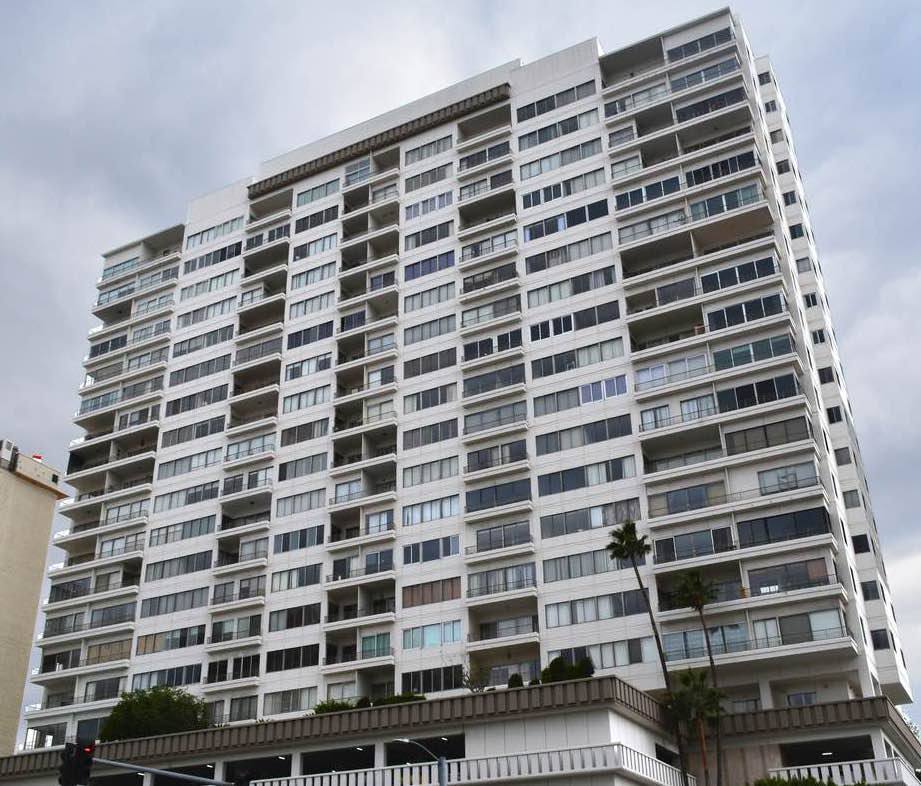
The Wilshire Regent condominiums in Los Angeles, California, U.S.

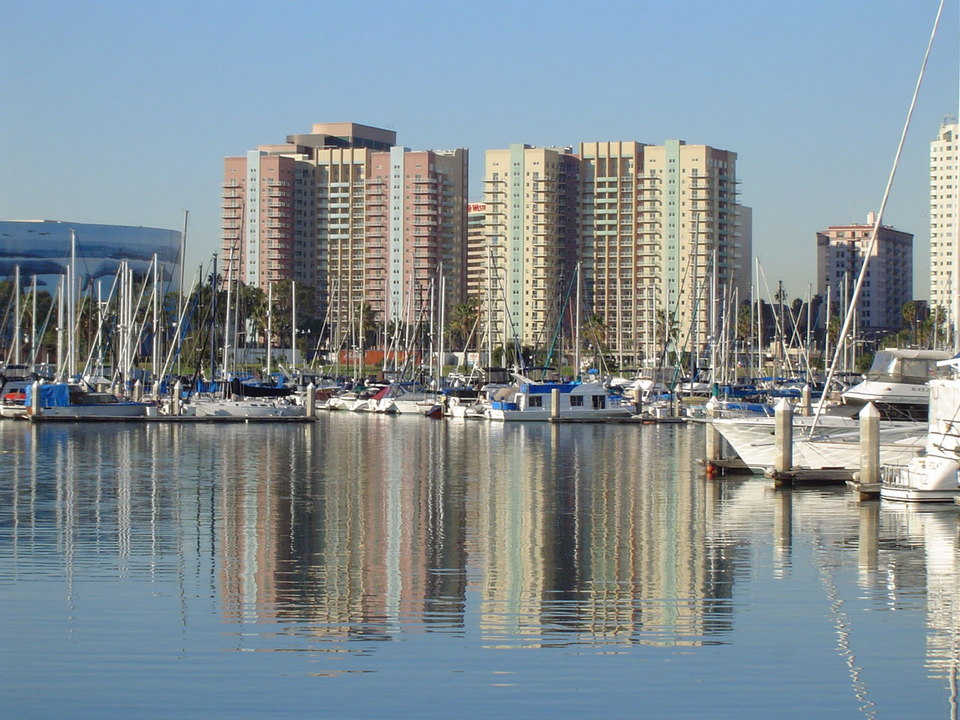
Aqua waterfront condominiums in Long Beach, California, U.S.

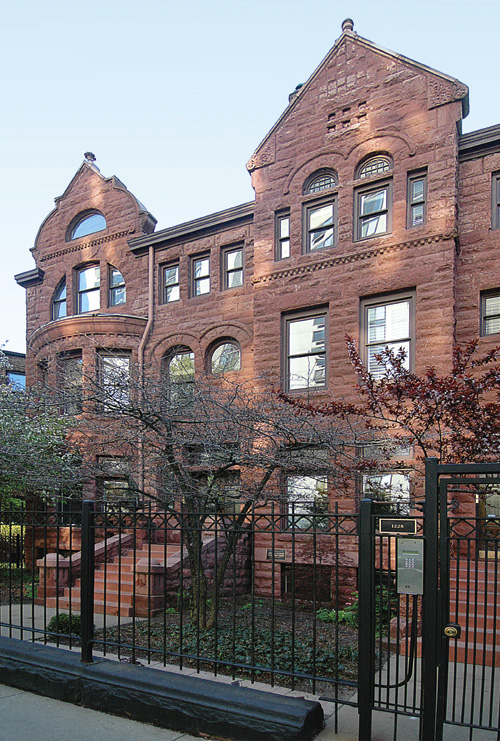
A historic mansion converted into condominiums in Chicago, U.S.

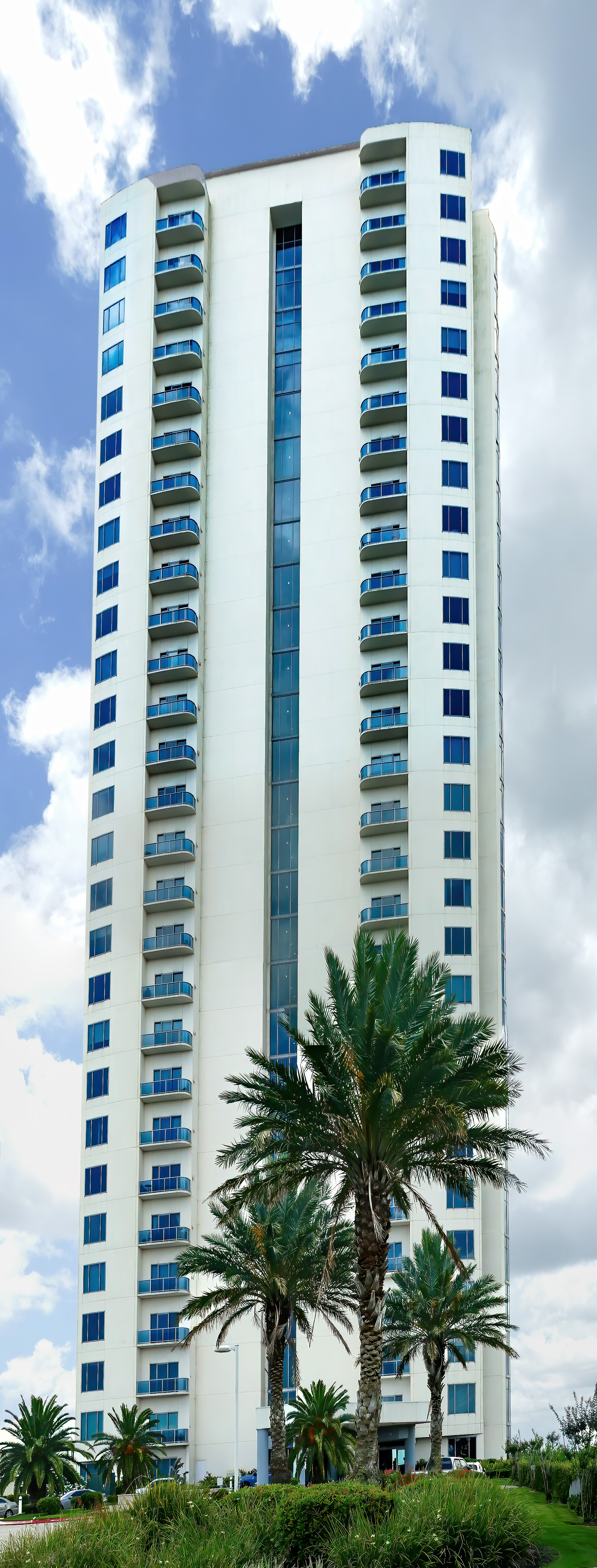
Endeavour Luxury Condominiums on Clear Lake, near Galveston Bay

New York's Condominium Act was passed in 1964. The first condominium building was the St. Tropez Condominium in Manhattan, built in 1965.

== See also ==
- Apartment
- Canadian Condominium Institute
- Car condo
- Common-interest development
- Community Associations Institute
- Condo conversion
- Condo hotel
- Condo Owners Association
- Condop
- Dockominium, a water-based version
- Home insurance
- Housing cooperative
- List of condominiums in Canada
- Microapartment
- Multi-family residential
- Mutual organization
- Private housing estates in Hong Kong
- Property management
- Studio apartment
