= Canadian Condominium Institute =

Canadian non-profit organization

The Canadian Condominium Institute (CCI) is an independent, non-profit organization formed in 1982 to represent all facets of the condominium/strata community. It has 17 Chapters across Canada.

== Origins ==
Toronto property manager David Medhurst established the CCI in November 1982 with Alvin Rosenberg (his law firm incorporated CCI), Beth Shier, the editor of Condominium Timeshare Magazine, Jonathan Fine, a Toronto Condominium Lawyer at Fine & Deo, Edward Furlong, a condominium accounting specialist and Karl Habb, a future president of the North York Condominium Association. The first meeting was held at Toronto's Inn on the Park Hotel on November 25, 1982, and those present are considered 'founding members' of the CCI. The first CCI President was Mr. Claude Renaud and the first vice-president was Jonathan Fine.

== Objectives ==
CCI provides educational opportunities for condominium owners and directors; offers information and/or referrals to competent professionals; works to improve provincial condominium/strata legislation; and develops standards for professional members (see ACCI, below).

== Membership ==
CCI members are of four types:

- Individual condominium unit owners
- Condominium/strata corporations
- Professional members (lawyers, engineers, property managers, etc.)
- Trade suppliers to the community

Through its membership, CCI represents over a quarter of a million condo owners across Canada.

== Education ==
CCI Chapters provide education for condominium owners and directors through a series of courses known as Condo 100, Condo 200 and Condo 300 (although some Chapters have added other courses to this mix). In addition, some Chapters provide seminars and workshops on topics such as insurance, mediation, etc.

== ACCI ==
The ACCI (Associate of the Canadian Condominium Institute) designation is granted to professionals in condominium matters such as lawyers, engineers, architects, and property (condominium) managers. To be eligible to become ACCIs, individuals must be professional members of CCI, have at least three years of professional condominium experience, have contributed to the condominium community by teaching courses, writing articles, participating in seminars or providing other services, and have successfully completed a thorough examination.

== Awards ==
CCI offers three awards:

- Fellow of the Canadian Condominium Institute (FCCI) CCI may elevate an ACCI to the status of "Fellow". Fellowship was created to recognize and honour Associates whose meritorious service to the Institute or to the condominium community best exemplifies the standards expected by CCI of its professional members. Past President Jonathan Fine was inducted as a fellow in November 1999.
- Distinguished Service Award (CCI Hon's) This honorary designation is awarded to individuals who, by their volunteer work or other achievements, have brought distinction to CCI (either nationally or at the Chapter level), exemplify the standards that CCI promotes and serve as positive role models for others
- Ron Danks Award. This is a national award, recognizing excellence in volunteer leadership at a national level for the Institute
- CCI's Hall of Fame This award is to recognize the outstanding and substantial contributions of a very limited number of members. The first inductee, in 2003, and to whom this award is dedicated, is Gerry Hyman, QC, LLM, ACCI, FCCI.

In addition to these three awards, CCI offers the Lorne Young Chapter of the Year Award and the H. Penman Smith Award for excellence for the most outstanding Chapter newsletter.

== Communications ==
Each chapter offers a newsletter or magazine, usually on a quarterly basis, focusing on local/provincial condominium issues and Chapter news. The Toronto chapter publishes CondoVoice, an-award-winning magazine.

== See also ==
- Condominium
- Property Management
