= Condominiums in Canada =

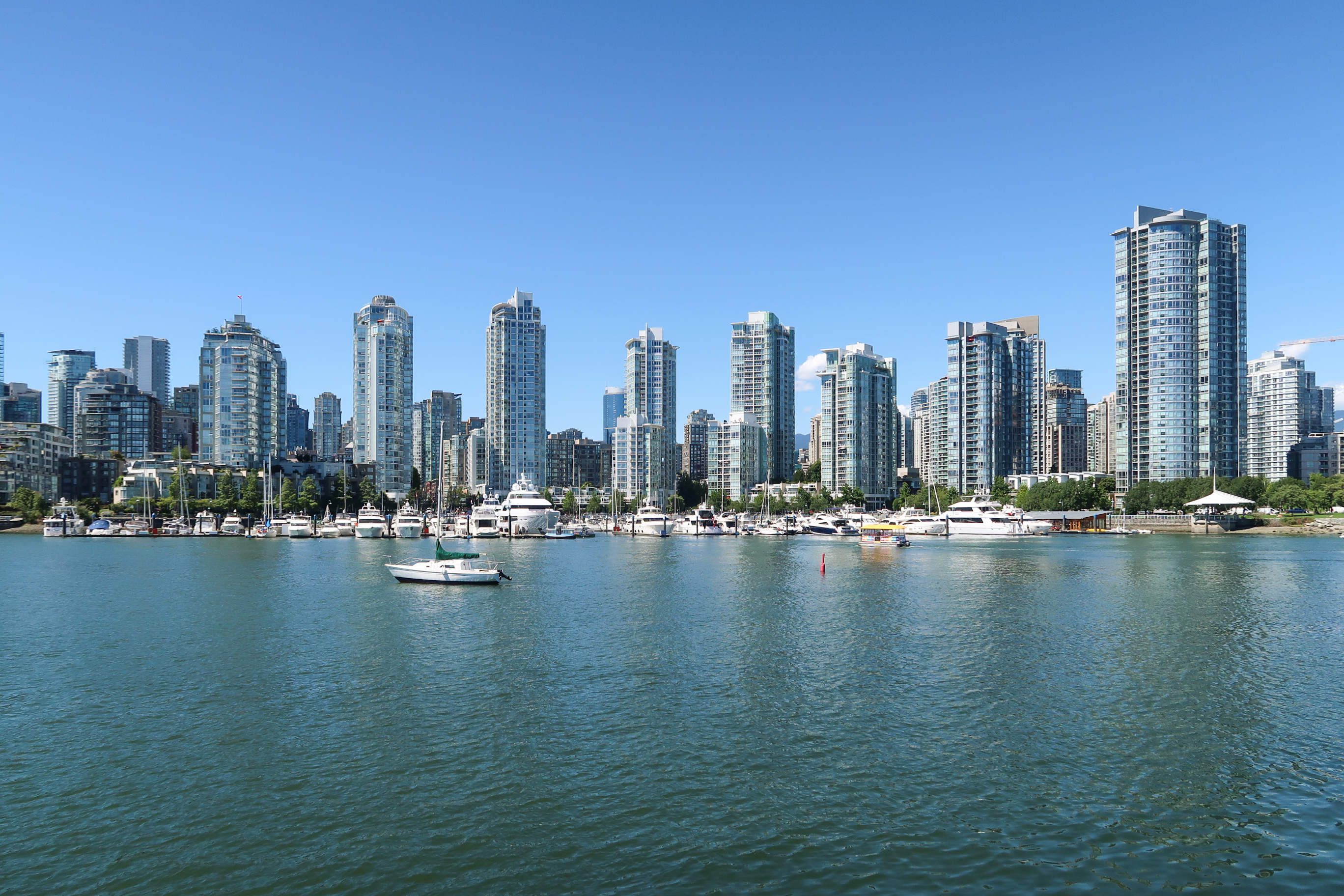
Condominium in Yaletown, Vancouver, Canada

One in eight Canadian households lived in a residential condominium dwellings, mostly located in a few census metropolitan areas according to Statistics Canada Condominiums exist throughout Canada, although condominiums are most frequently found in the larger cities. "Condominium" is a legal term used in most provinces of Canada. in British Columbia, it is referred to as "strata title" and in Quebec, the term "divided co-property" (French: copropriété divisée) is used, although the colloquial name remains "condominium".

With regular condominiums, the unit owner usually owns the internal unit space and a percentage of the common property; in the case of a freehold condominium (or a bare/vacant land condominium) the owner owns the land and building and a percentage of any common property shared roadways and amenities. The Canadian Condominium Institute is a non-profit association of condominium owners and corporations with chapters in each province and territory. The Condo Owners Association COA Ontario is a non-profit association representing condominium owners with divisions across the province and districts within the various municipalities.

== History ==
Before 1981 condominiums made up less than ten percent of homes built in Canada.

== Alberta ==
=== History in Alberta ===
Condominiums were first introduced to Alberta in 1967 with the development of Brentwood Village, a townhouse complex in Edmonton, Alberta. Condominiums in Alberta are regulated by the Condominium Property Act (Chapter 22, RSA 2000) which is supplemented by the Condominium Property Regulation (AR 168/2000). It was most recently reported that over 8,000 condominium projects house over 250,000 residents in Alberta as of September 29, 2022 by Thomson Reuters Canada.

=== Regulation of Condominiums ===
Condominiums in Alberta are self-regulated by their elected board of directors, though there are changes being made to legislation to introduce the Condominium Dispute Tribunal which was first modeled in Ontario.

To a much greater extent, condominiums in Alberta gained protection when Condominium Managers became a professionally licensed designation through the Real Estate Council of Alberta on December 1, 2021.

=== Associations in Alberta ===
==== Condo Owners' Forum Society of Alberta ====
Founded in 2015, the mission of the Condominium Owners Forum Society of Alberta is to provide individual and business condo owners and occupants with opportunities for networking, education, and advocacy to improve the management and value of our properties, strengthen governance of our corporations, enhance the public perception of condominium living, and foster a greater sense of community and collaboration amongst all stakeholders.

==== The Association of Condominium Managers of Alberta ====
Founded in 1997, the mission of The Association of Condominium Managers of Alberta is to provide quality professional development to career-focused condominium managers. Through education, seminars, and conferences ACMA provides its members with new solutions to elevate their practice of condominium management with the ultimate vision of having Alberta condominium corporations’ assets protected by engaged, educated, and ethical managers.

==== The Canadian Condominium Institute, North Alberta Chapter ====
The North Alberta Chapter of the Canadian Condominium Institute supports the condominium industry in Northern Alberta.

==== The Canadian Condominium Institute, South Alberta Chapter ====
The South Alberta Chapter of the Canadian Condominium Institute supports the condominium industry in Southern Alberta.

== British Columbia ==
Over a million people live in strata housing in British Columbia. Strata properties are a popular housing choice in B.C. because it is convenient, provides security and added amenities and is usually less costly than buying a single-family home.

As the price of single-family housing has soared to unprecedented levels in Vancouver, the number of new condominium sales has increased, along with prices. According to the Real Estate Board of Greater Vancouver, the benchmark price for a condo in July 2016 was $510,600 in the region, up 27.4 per cent from the same month in 2015.

=== Insurance under the Strata Property Act ===
The Act requires all stratas to maintain an insurance policy for a minimum of $2 million (property and liability) that covers the common elements and the units as originally buïlt.

== Ontario ==
There are over 1.3 million condo owners and/or residents living in more than 587,000 condominium units in Ontario. One-half of new construction in 2013 was condominium-related. In recent years, the condominium industry has been booming in Canada, with dozens of new towers being erected each year. Toronto is the centre of this boom, with 17,000 new units being sold in 2005, more than double second place Miami's 7,500 units. Toronto's condo population has grown from 978,125 in 2011 to 1.478 million people in 2016 representing 54.7% of the city population according to Toronto Condo News.

Outside of Toronto, the most common forms of condominium have been townhomes rather than highrises, although that trend may be altered as limitations are placed on "Greenfields" (see Greenfield land) developments in those areas (in turn, forcing developers to expand upward rather than outward and to consider more condominium conversions instead of new housing). Particular growth areas are in Kitchener/Waterloo, Barrie, and London. In fact, after Toronto, the Golden Horseshoe Chapter of the Canadian Condominium Institute is one of that organization's most thriving chapters.

=== Ontario Condominium Act ===
==== Condominium Authority of Ontario ====
Condominium Authority of Ontario (CAO) was established in 2017 by the province of Ontario to address concerns about condo living and management in the province. Its goal is to minimize issues before they become disputes to help with community building. To do this they have implemented three pillars; education, mandated reporting and disclosure of information, and a tribunal for handling disputes that arise In a March 2018 Toronto Condo News article, the executive director of the Condominium Authority of Ontario explains it has an "overarching goal to enhance consumer protection for condominium owners, directors and residents. This is made possible through a comprehensive offering of information about condominium ownership including self-help tools, mandatory director training, and a new online dispute resolution service, the Condominium Authority Tribunal (CAT)."

==== Ontario Condominium Act, 1998 ====
Until December 2015, condominiums in Ontario were governed by the Ontario Condominium Act, 1998 with each development establishing a corporation to deal with day-to-day functions (maintenance, repairs, etc.). A board of directors is elected by the owners of units (or, in the case of a common elements condominium corporation, the owners of the common interest in the common elements) in the development on at least a yearly basis. A general meeting is held annually to deal with board elections and the appointment of an auditor (or waiving of audit). Other matters can also be dealt with at the Annual General Meeting, but special meetings of the owners can be called by the board and, in some cases, by the owners themselves, at any time.

The Ontario Condominium Act, 1998 provided an effectively wide range of development options, including Standard, Phased, Vacant Land, Common Element and Leasehold condominiums. Certain existing condominiums can amalgamate, and existing properties can be converted to condominium (provided municipal requirements for the same are met). Accordingly, the expanded and expanding use of the condominium concept is permitting developers and municipalities to consider newer and more interesting forms of development to meet social needs.

On this issue, Ontario condominium lawyer Michael Clifton writes, "Condominium development has steadily increased in Ontario for several years. While condominiums typically represent an attractive lifestyle and home-ownership alternatives for buyers, they also, importantly, introduce a new approach to community planning for home builders and municipal approval authorities in Ontario. ...[There are] opportunities for developers to be both creative and profitable in building, and municipalities more flexible and imaginative in planning and approving, developments that will become sustainable communities."

Reserve fund contributions are ten per cent of the condominium fees collected or higher. Contrary to other jurisdictions such as Alberta, Ontario does not provide flexibility for small condo corporations to conduct their own reserve fund study, or to update it less frequently than required for large corporations. Managers of small condominium corporations have asked the Ontario Ministry of Consumer Services to review this requirement as it becomes burdensome for the management of smaller buildings.

==== Condo Associations ====
There are various associations serving condominiums in Ontario:

The Canadian Condominium Institute was established in 1982 and is a national, independent, non-profit organization dealing exclusively with condominium issues. Assists its members through education, information dissemination, publications, workshops, conferences and technical assistance. Encourages and provides objective research or practitioners and government agencies regarding all aspects of condominium operations. Works with provincial and federal governments for improvements to legislation. Advocates for higher standards in all services to the condominium client. CCI has chapters across Canada. Members are condominium unit owners, condominium corporation, and professionals and business partners serving the condominium industry. https://www.cci.ca/about/what-is-cci

The Association of Condominium Managers of Ontario is the association of Professional Condominium Managers across Ontario.

The Community Associations Institute is an international organization, with one Canadian Chapter that also serves condominium communities.

The Condo Owners Association (COA) in Ontario was established in March 2010 by Founder Linda Pinizzotto in March 2010, a Toronto/Mississauga Realtor who had a vision to create a non profit Association to provide a cohesive united voice to represent condominium owners across the province of Ontario to all levels of Government and to advocate for a Condo Act Review to update and modernize the Condo Act in Ontario.

==== Protecting Condominium Owners Act, 2015 ====
On May 27, 2015, David Orazietti, Ontario's Minister of Government and Consumer Services, introduced a new bill called the Protecting Condominium Owners Act, 2015. The bill called for the creation of a new Condominium Authority, which would be funded by a $1 a month fee on individual condo owners and by condo developers, that would provide advice for condo owners, facilitate dispute resolution between owners and boards regarding issues such as noise complaints, bylaw infractions or an inability to get financial statements from the board of directors. Critics of the bill said that the bill would result in increased fees and more special assessments. The aim of the Act is to make it less expensive to resolve disputes. The Act will require boards to issue reports to owners on things such as insurance or legal proceedings. Clear language will spell out the amount of an adequate Reserve fund study and help eliminate surprise hikes in condo fees or special assessments levied against each unit. On December 2, 2015 Third Reading of this Act was Carried on division and on December 3, 2015 Royal Assent was received,

===== Condo Management Regulatory Authority of Ontario =====
The Act introduces a new body, the Condo Management Regulatory Authority of Ontario. There will be training and licensing of condominium management companies and individuals to ensure those hired to run multimillion-dollar condominium corporations are adequately trained to reduce the risk of fraud and mismanagement. The Act also introduces a code of ethics for condo managers. There were 2,500 people managing 10,000 condominium developments in Ontario, with 700,000 individual units.

== Saskatchewan ==
In Saskatchewan, condominiums are registered as a special type of non-profit corporation that is owned by the unit owners; the owners elect a board of directors; the operation of the corporation is governed by The Condominium Property Act, 1993.

== Criticism and controversy ==
According to Maclean's:

Canadian condos are rife with internal politics, neighbour infighting and power struggles stemming from the complicated network of condo boards, owners, investors, tenants and property managers

== See also ==
=== Categories ===
- Category:Condominiums in Canada
- Category:Condominium
