= Richmond West =

Neighbourhood in Winnipeg, Manitoba, Canada

Richmond West Fort Richmond West
- Neighbourhood
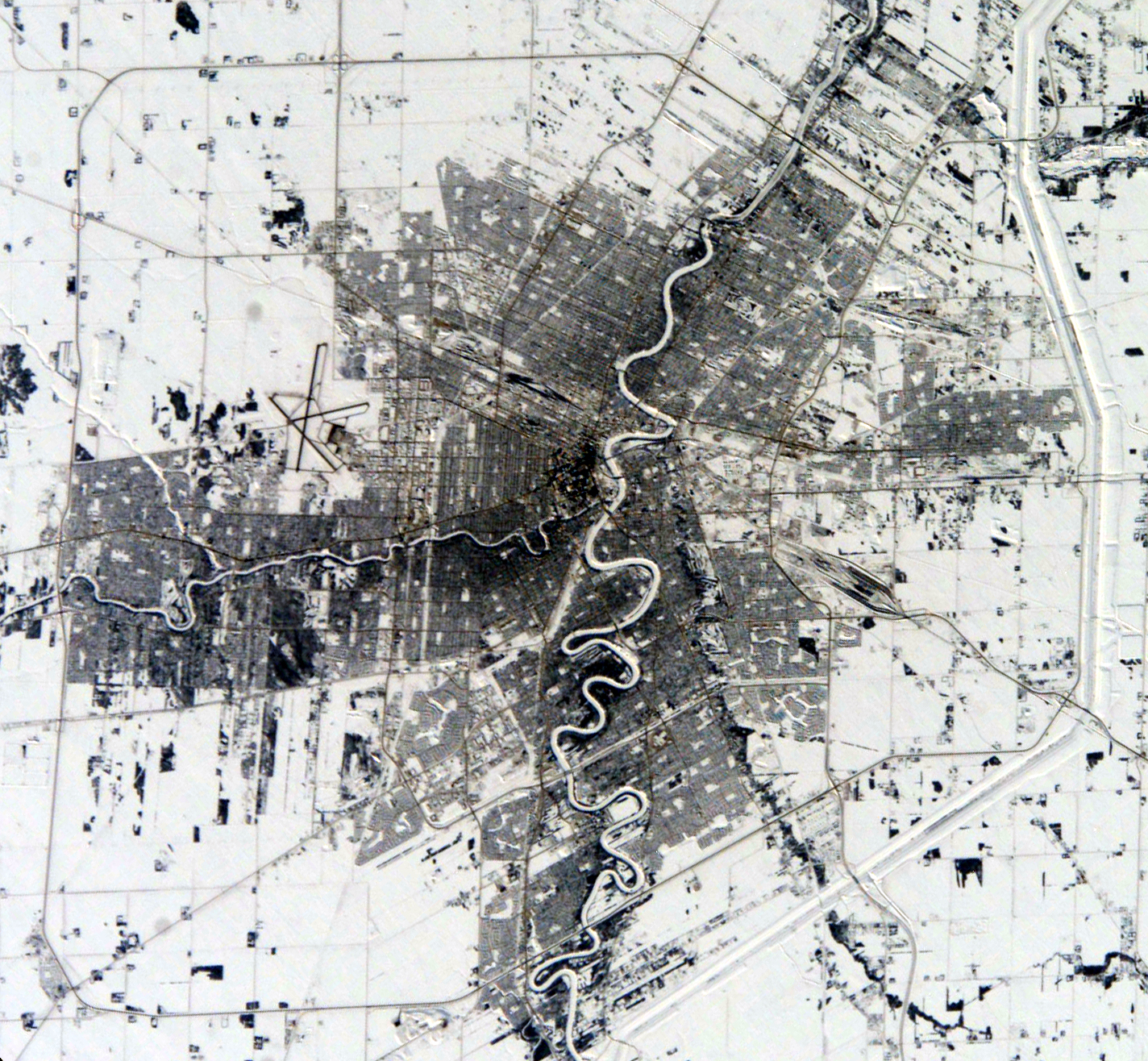
- Location within Winnipeg
- Coordinates: 49.782°N 97.164°W
- First developed: 1978
- Named for: Fort Richmond, Winnipeg

Area
  - Total: 2.7 km^{2} (1.0 sq mi)

Population (2016)
  - Total: 8,605
  - Density: 3,200/km^{2} (8,300/sq mi)
- Area codes: 204, 431

Richmond West (originally Fort Richmond West) is a suburb in the Waverley West area of southwest Winnipeg, Manitoba.

The area was originally part of the Rural Municipality of Fort Garry, which was incorporated in 1912. Richmond West is located north of the Perimeter Highway, east of Waverley Street, west of Pembina Highway, and south of Bison Drive. Further, the CN Letellier line goes from north to south along the east side of its boundary and to Letellier, Manitoba.

== History ==
The Richmond West neighbourhood began development in 1978.

Initially developed by Ladco Homes, Richmond West expanded from the south starting in the early 1980s and 1990s. expanding north during the late 1990s and 2000s. During initial development, new residents were upset that they were being assessed at the rate of $30 per square foot on their properties based on comparable properties in Fort Richmond, yet not yet receiving municipal services.

== Amenities ==
There are some commercial and industrial properties along Pembina and Perimeter Highway in the area. Central to the neighbourhood is Kirkbridge Park. The area does not, however, have a recreational facility of its own.

Richmond West is part of the Pembina Trails School Division, with the area itself having one school in it, Bairdmore Elementary School.
