= Schmoo torte =

Canadian dessert

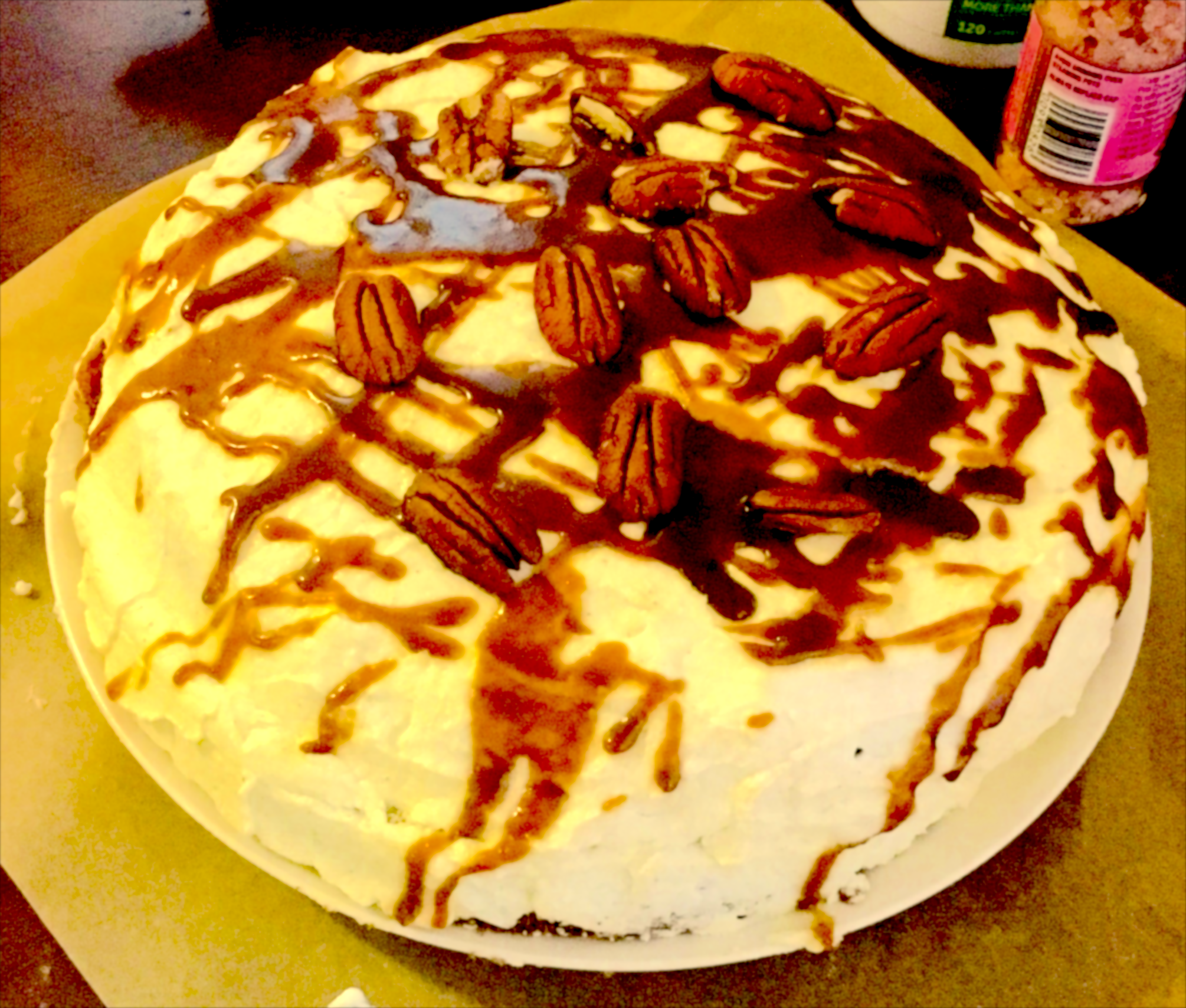
- Schmoo torte on a plate
- Type: Cake
- Course: Dessert
- Place of origin: Canada
- Region or state: Western Canada
- Main ingredients: Whipped cream, brown sugar, nuts

Schmoo torte is a Canadian dessert. Although it is relatively popular and well-known nationwide, it is most famous in Western Canada, especially Winnipeg, Manitoba. It is a torte with layered whipped cream, brown sugar, and nuts, commonly made using angel food or sponge cake.

== History ==
The schmoo torte was first invented in 1948 by a Winnipeg mother, Dora Zaslavsky, for her son Murray's Bar Mitzvah in Winnipeg, Manitoba. Zaslavsky was a Russian-Jewish immigrant who arrived to Canada in 1914. She started introducing her recipes to Winnipeg via a catering business to support her family financially when her husband became ill. Zaslavsky's catering business eventually expanded across North America. Her schmoo torte became a favourite of singer Harry Belafonte.

Murray's daughter Shannon Aceman stated in an interview that her grandmother's schmoo torte "was basically a mix of about three or four of her other best-known recipes for cakes with the rum torte." Jewish food historian Kat Romanow told CTV News Winnipeg that schmoo is reminiscent of a central-European dessert called nusstorte. Romanow told CTV News: "In many cases, the dishes that Ashkenazi Jews brought with them to Canada came to be iconic dishes of their new homes."

== See also ==
- List of desserts
