= Flag of Winnipeg =

City of Winnipeg
- Proportion: 1:2
- Adopted: October 1, 1975
- Design: Per bend sinister Azure and Or, a bendlet sinister nowy Argent surmounted in the center by the city's coat of arms
- Designed by: Robert Watt

The city flag of Winnipeg was adopted in October 1975. Today, the flag with its crest is used as the official representation of the city for ceremonial and official purposes, while the logo flag (adopted in 2001) is used for promotional purposes.

In the centre of the flag lies the city's coat of arms, with blue to the upper left, and yellow to the lower right. The blue represents Winnipeg's clear blue sky, and the gold a field of wheat, the city's original primary economic activity; the colours and symbolism are thus similar to those of the flag of Ukraine.

While official colours have never formally been designated by the city, the blue and yellow design was adopted as the official colours for Winnipeg's centennial celebrations in 1973. The logo flag also incorporates the two colours, along with red and white.

The official flag itself was adopted upon a vote by the City Council on October 1, 1975, and was registered as a trademark April 7 the following year.

== Logo flag ==
On January 18, 2001, the City of Winnipeg adopted a new logo as part of a branding initiative, adapted into a logo flag with the proportions of 1:2. This flag is currently used for promotional purposes, contrast to the official flag's use in ceremonial and official purposes.

The logo flag uses the colours that are found on the official flag, as well as others. It has a dark blue field (background) with "Winnipeg" in white serifed letters, centred in the lower field. Above the letters is a medium-blue-coloured arc, above which are two crescents: yellow on the left, facing right, and dark blue on the right, inside the yellow one, facing left. Within this crescent is a red circle or droplet-like shape, meant to symbolize the 'heart' of the Winnipeg community and its people. According to the City, the logo, as a whole, "resembles a rising sun above the horizon and also mimics the form of a leaping figure."

== See also ==
- Coat of arms of Winnipeg
- Flag of Manitoba
