= Coat of arms of Winnipeg =

Heraldic emblem of the city

- Armiger: Winnipeg, Manitoba
- Adopted: 1973

The emblazonment of the coat of arms used by the City

The coat of arms of Winnipeg is the full armorial achievement as used by the municipal government as an official symbol. The present coat of arms were granted through a letter patent from the College of Arms in 1979.

The coat of arms was used to create the Flag of Winnipeg in 1975.

== History ==
Before coat of arms were adopted in 1874, a purple seal was used by the city clerk and on documents. The first coat of arms, used from 1874 to 1973, featured a bison serving as a crest the prairies and Indigenous culture and economy. On the arms, the locomotive symbolized the railroad leading to Winnipeg and the wheat the agriculture and its position. Under the shield, was the motto “Commerce, prudence, industry”. The present coat of arms were granted through a letter patent from the College of Arms in 1979. It was then registered by the Canadian Heraldic Authority in 2005.

== Blazon ==
Arms: Vert a prairie crocus slipped proper on a chief Azure fimbriated thirteen mullets Or;

Crest: Within a circlet of prairie crocus the gate of Old Fort Garry proper;

== Use ==
The arms are used by the municipal government as an official symbol and is present on the city flag, adopted in 1975 in which it is encircled by a white circle which itself is surrounded by a blue and yellow bar similar to those seen on the Flag of Ukraine. The arms can also be seen on a carpet in the city hall. The arms make up the badge of the Winnipeg Police Service which was registered by the Canadian Heraldic Authority in 1994.
