= Winnipeg =

Capital city of Manitoba, Canada

- City and provincial capital
- City of Winnipeg
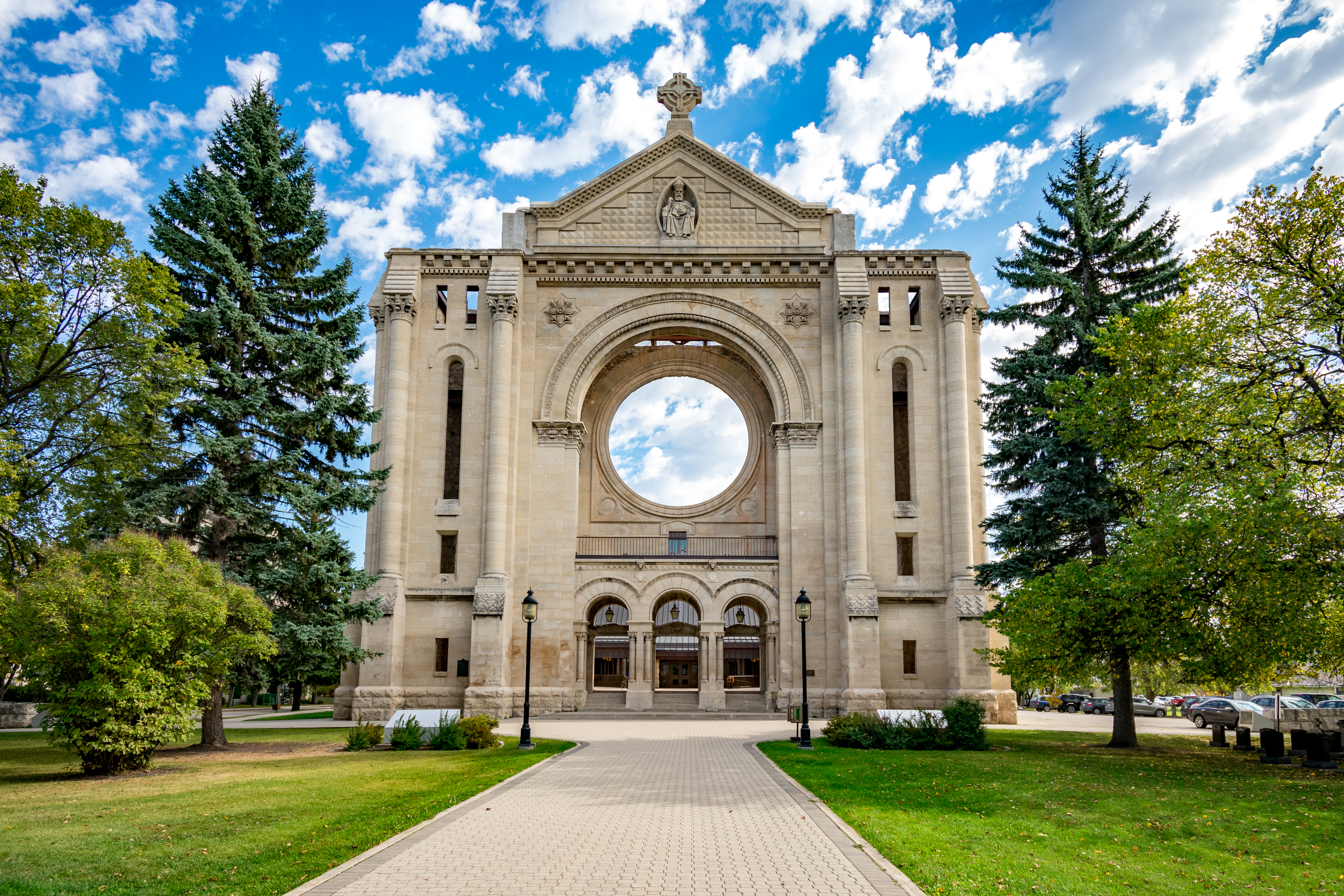
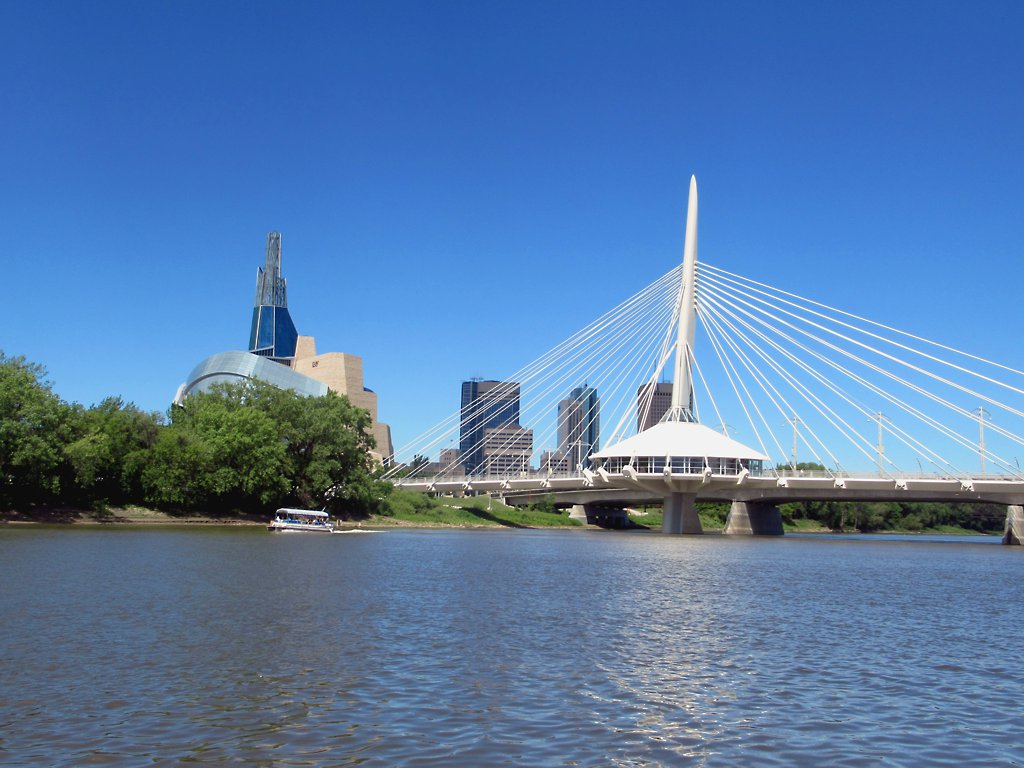
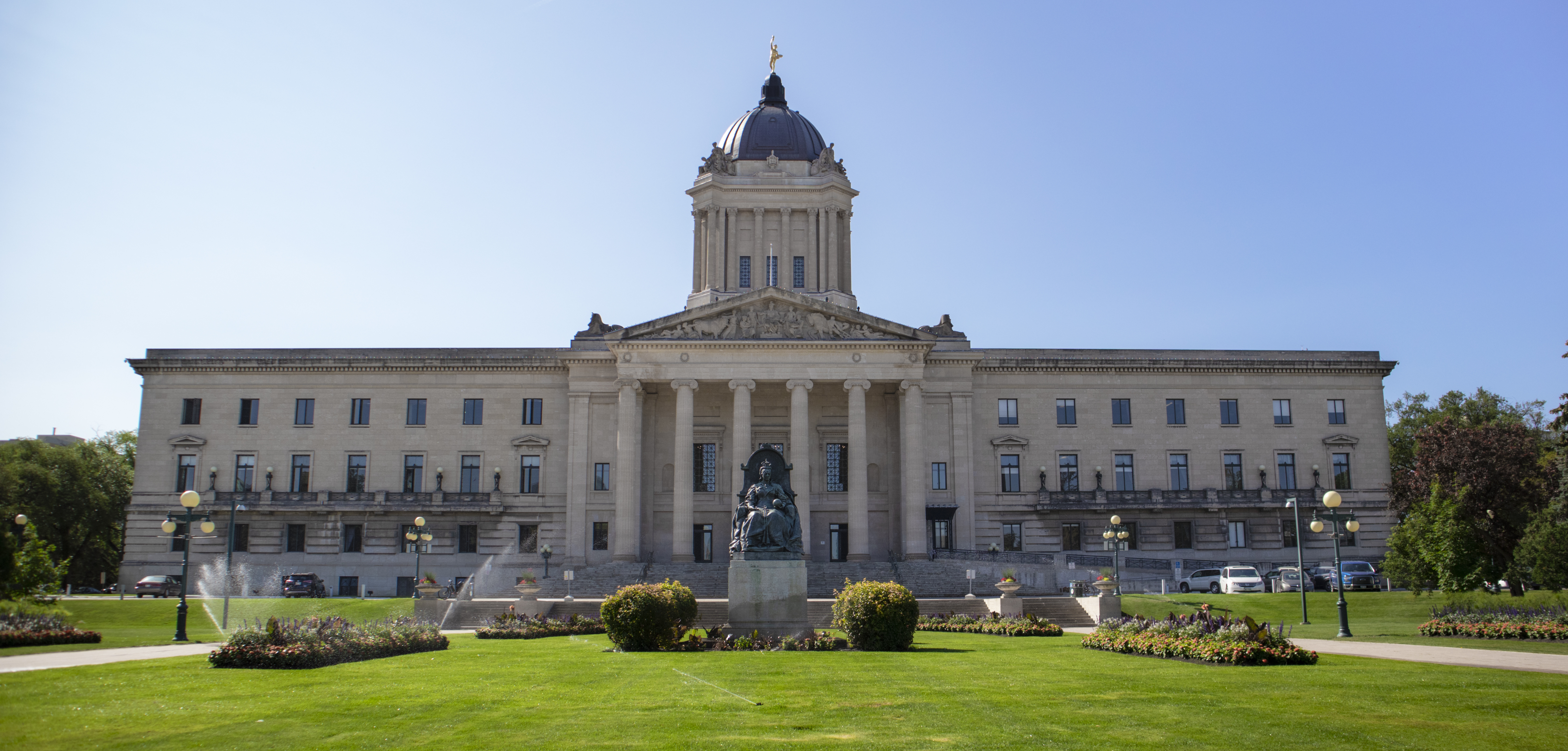
- Skyline of Downtown Winnipeg Saint Boniface Cathedral Esplanade Riel bridge Manitoba Legislative Building

- Flag Coat of arms Logo
- Nicknames: "Winterpeg"
- Motto: Unum cum virtute multorum ('One with the Strength of Many')
- Interactive map of Winnipeg
- Location within Canada Location within Manitoba
- Coordinates: 49°53′44″N 97°8′19″W
- Country: Canada
- Province: Manitoba
- Region: Winnipeg Metropolitan Region
- Incorporated: 1873

Government
  - Mayor: Scott Gillingham
  - Governing body: Winnipeg City Council

Area
  - Land: 461.78 km^{2} (178.29 sq mi)
  - Metro: 5,285.46 km^{2} (2,040.73 sq mi)
- Elevation: 239 m (784 ft)

Population (2021)
  - City: 749,607 (6th)
  - Estimate (2025): 850,260
  - Density: 1,623/km^{2} (4,200/sq mi)
  - Urban: 758,515 (7th)
  - Metro: 834,678 (8th)
- Demonym: Winnipegger

GDP (Nominal, 2021)
  - Metro: CA$48.39 billion (US$38.71 billion)
  - Per capita: CA$56,250 (US$45,000)
- Time zone: UTC−5 (Central Daylight Time)
- Area codes: 204, 431, 584
- Website: winnipeg.ca

Winnipeg (/ˈwɪnɪpɛɡ/) is the capital and largest city of the Canadian province of Manitoba. It is centred on the confluence of the Red and Assiniboine rivers. As of 2021, Winnipeg had a city population of 749,607 and a metropolitan population of 834,678, making it Canada's sixth-largest city and eighth-largest metropolitan area. In 2025, the city's estimated population reached 850,260.

The city is named after the nearby Lake Winnipeg; the name Winnipeg comes from the Western Cree words for 'muddy water' – winipīhk. The region was a trading centre for Indigenous peoples long before the arrival of Europeans; it is the traditional territory of the Anishinaabe (Ojibway), Ininew (Cree), Anisininew (Oji-Cree), Dene, and Dakota, and is the birthplace of the Métis Nation. French traders built the first fort, Fort Rouge, on the site in 1738. A settlement was later founded by the Selkirk settlers of the Red River Colony in 1812, the nucleus of which was incorporated as the "City of Winnipeg" in 1873. Being far inland, the city's climate is extremely seasonal (continental) even by Canadian standards, with average January highs of around −11 °C (12 °F) and average July highs of 26 °C (79 °F).

Known as the "Gateway to the West", Winnipeg is a railway and transportation hub with a diversified economy. It hosts numerous annual festivals, including the Festival du Voyageur, the Winnipeg Folk Festival, the Jazz Winnipeg Festival, the Winnipeg Fringe Theatre Festival, and Folklorama. Winnipeg was the first Canadian host of the Pan American Games in 1967. It is home to several professional sports franchises, including the Winnipeg Blue Bombers (Canadian football), Winnipeg Jets (ice hockey), Manitoba Moose (ice hockey), Winnipeg Sea Bears (basketball), and the Winnipeg Goldeyes (baseball).

== Etymology ==
Winnipeg is named after nearby Lake Winnipeg, 65 kilometres (40 mi) north of the city. English explorer Henry Kelsey may have been the first European to see the lake in 1690. He adopted the Cree and Ojibwe name, win-nipi (also transcribed win-nipiy or ouenpig), meaning 'murky water' or 'muddy water' (modern Cree: wīnipēk, ᐑᓂᐯᐠ). French-Canadian fur trader La Vérendrye referred to the lake as Lac Gouinipique or Ouinipigon when he built the first forts in the area in the 1730s. Local newspaper The Nor'-Wester included the name on its masthead on 24 February 1866, and the city was incorporated by that name by the Manitoba Legislature in 1873.

== History ==
=== Early history ===
Winnipeg lies at the confluence of the Assiniboine and the Red River of the North, a location now known as "The Forks". This point was at the crossroads of canoe routes travelled by First Nations before European contact. Evidence provided by archaeology, petroglyphs, rock art, and oral history indicates that native peoples used the area in prehistoric times for camping, harvesting, hunting, tool making, fishing, trading and, farther north, for agriculture.

Estimates of the date of first settlement in the area range from 11,500 years ago for a site southwest of the present city to 6,000 years ago at the Forks. In 1805, Canadian colonists observed First Nations peoples engaged in farming activity along the Red River. The practice quickly expanded, driven by the demand by traders for provisions. The rivers provided an extensive transportation network linking northern First Peoples with those to the south along the Missouri and Mississippi rivers. The Ojibwe made some of the first maps on birch bark, which helped fur traders navigate the waterways of the area.

Sieur de La Vérendrye built the first fur-trading post on the site in 1738, called Fort Rouge. French trading continued at the site for several decades. The British Hudson's Bay Company took over when France ceded the territory following its defeat in the Seven Years' War. Many French men who were trappers married First Nations women; their mixed-race children hunted, traded, and lived in the area. Their descendants are known as the Métis.

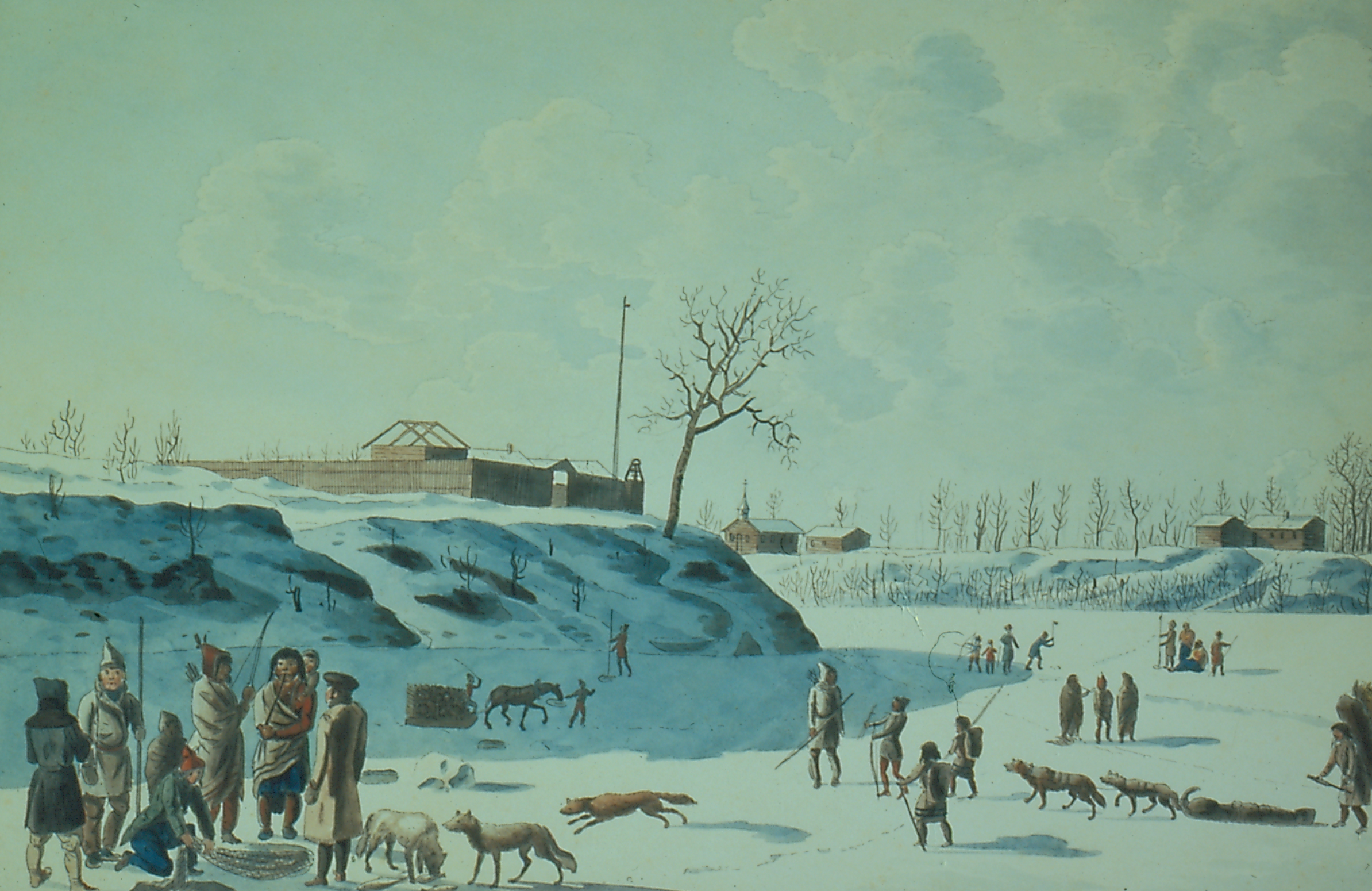
An 1821 painting of winter fishing on the ice of the Assiniboine and Red rivers. Fort Gibraltar was erected in 1809.

Lord Selkirk was involved with the first permanent settlement (known as the Red River Colony), the purchase of land from the Hudson's Bay Company, and a survey of river lots in the early 19th century. The North West Company built Fort Gibraltar in 1809, and the Hudson's Bay Company built Fort Douglas in 1812, both in the area of present-day Winnipeg. The two companies competed fiercely over trade. The Métis and Lord Selkirk's settlers fought at the Battle of Seven Oaks in 1816. In 1821, the Hudson's Bay and North West Companies merged, ending their long rivalry. Fort Gibraltar was renamed Fort Garry in 1822 and became the leading post in the region for the Hudson's Bay Company. A flood destroyed the fort in 1826 and it was not rebuilt until 1835. A rebuilt section of the fort, consisting of the front gate and a section of the wall, is near the modern-day corner of Main Street and Broadway in downtown Winnipeg.

In 1869–70, present-day Winnipeg was the site of the Red River Rebellion, a conflict between the local provisional government of Métis, led by Louis Riel, and newcomers from eastern Canada. General Garnet Wolseley was sent to suppress the uprising. The Manitoba Act of 1870 made Manitoba the fifth province of the three-year-old Canadian Confederation. Treaty 1, which encompassed the city and much of the surrounding area, was signed on 3 August 1871 by representatives of the Crown and local Indigenous groups, comprising the Brokenhead Ojibway, Sagkeeng, Long Plain, Peguis, Roseau River Anishinabe, Sandy Bay and Swan Lake communities. On 8 November 1873, Winnipeg was incorporated as a city, with the Selkirk settlement as its nucleus. Métis legislator and interpreter James McKay named the city. Winnipeg's mandate was to govern and provide municipal services to citizens attracted to trade expansion between Upper Fort Garry / Lower Fort Garry and Saint Paul, Minnesota.

Winnipeg developed rapidly after the coming of the Canadian Pacific Railway in 1881. The railway divided the North End, which housed mainly Eastern Europeans, from the richer Anglo-Saxon southern part of the city. It also contributed to a demographic shift beginning shortly after Confederation that saw the francophone population decrease from a majority to a small minority group. This shift resulted in Premier Thomas Greenway controversially ending legislative bilingualism and removing funding for French Catholic Schools in 1890.

=== Modern history (1900–present) ===
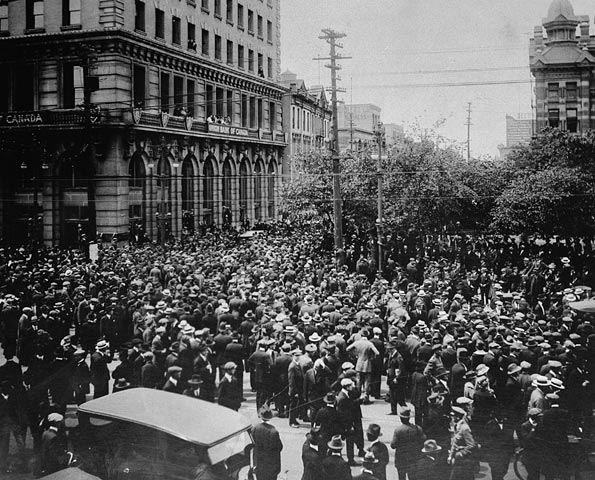
Crowd gathered outside old City Hall during the Winnipeg General Strike in 1919

By 1911, Winnipeg was Canada's third-largest city. However, the city faced financial difficulty when the Panama Canal opened in 1914. The canal reduced reliance on Canada's rail system for international trade; the increase in shipping traffic helped Vancouver to surpass Winnipeg in both prosperity and population by the end of World War I.

More than 30,000 workers walked off their jobs in May 1919 in what came to be known as the Winnipeg general strike. The strike was a product of postwar recession, labour conditions, the activity of union organizers and a large influx of returning World War I soldiers seeking work. After many arrests, deportations, and incidents of violence, the strike ended on 21 June 1919 when the Riot Act was read. A group of Royal Canadian Mounted Police officers charged a group of strikers. Two strikers were killed and at least thirty others were injured on the day that became known as Bloody Saturday; the event polarized the population. One of the leaders of the strike, J. S. Woodsworth, went on to found Canada's first major socialist party, the Co-operative Commonwealth Federation, which later became the New Democratic Party.

The Manitoba Legislative Building, constructed mainly of Tyndall stone, opened in 1920; its dome supports a bronze statue finished in gold leaf, titled "Eternal Youth and the Spirit of Enterprise" (commonly known as the "Golden Boy"). Proportional voting was also introduced in 1920, and used provincially until 1957. The stock market crash of 1929 and the Great Depression resulted in widespread unemployment, worsened by drought and low agricultural prices. The Depression ended after the start of World War II in 1939.

In 1942, the Canadian Victory Loan campaign simulated a Nazi occupation of the city to raise war bonds.

In the Battle of Hong Kong, The Winnipeg Grenadiers were among the first Canadians to engage in combat against Japanese military forces. Battalion members who survived combat were taken prisoner and endured brutal treatment in prisoner of war camps. In 1942, the Victory Loan Campaign staged a mock Nazi invasion of Winnipeg to promote awareness of the stakes of the war in Europe. When the war ended, pent-up demand generated a boom in housing development, although building activity was checked by the 1950 Red River flood. The federal government estimated damage at over $26 million, although the province indicated that it was at least double that. The damage caused by the flood led then-Premier Duff Roblin to advocate for the construction of the Red River Floodway.

Before 1972, Winnipeg was the largest of thirteen cities and towns in a metropolitan area around the Red and Assiniboine Rivers. In 1960, the Metropolitan Corporation of Greater Winnipeg was established to co-ordinate service delivery in the metropolitan region. A consolidated metropolitan "unicity" government incorporating Winnipeg and its surrounding municipalities was established on 27 July 1971, taking effect in 1972. The City of Winnipeg Act incorporated the current city. In 2003, the City of Winnipeg Act was repealed and replaced with the City of Winnipeg Charter.

Winnipeg experienced a severe economic downturn in advance of the early 1980s recession, during which the city incurred closures of prominent businesses, including the Winnipeg Tribune, as well as the Swift's and Canada Packers meat packing plants. In 1981, Winnipeg was one of the first cities in Canada to sign a tripartite agreement with the provincial and federal governments to redevelop its downtown area, and the three levels of government contributed over $271 million to its development. In 1989, the reclamation and redevelopment of the CNR rail yards turned the Forks into Winnipeg's most popular tourist attraction. The city was threatened by the 1997 Red River flood as well as further floods in 2009 and 2011.

== Geography ==
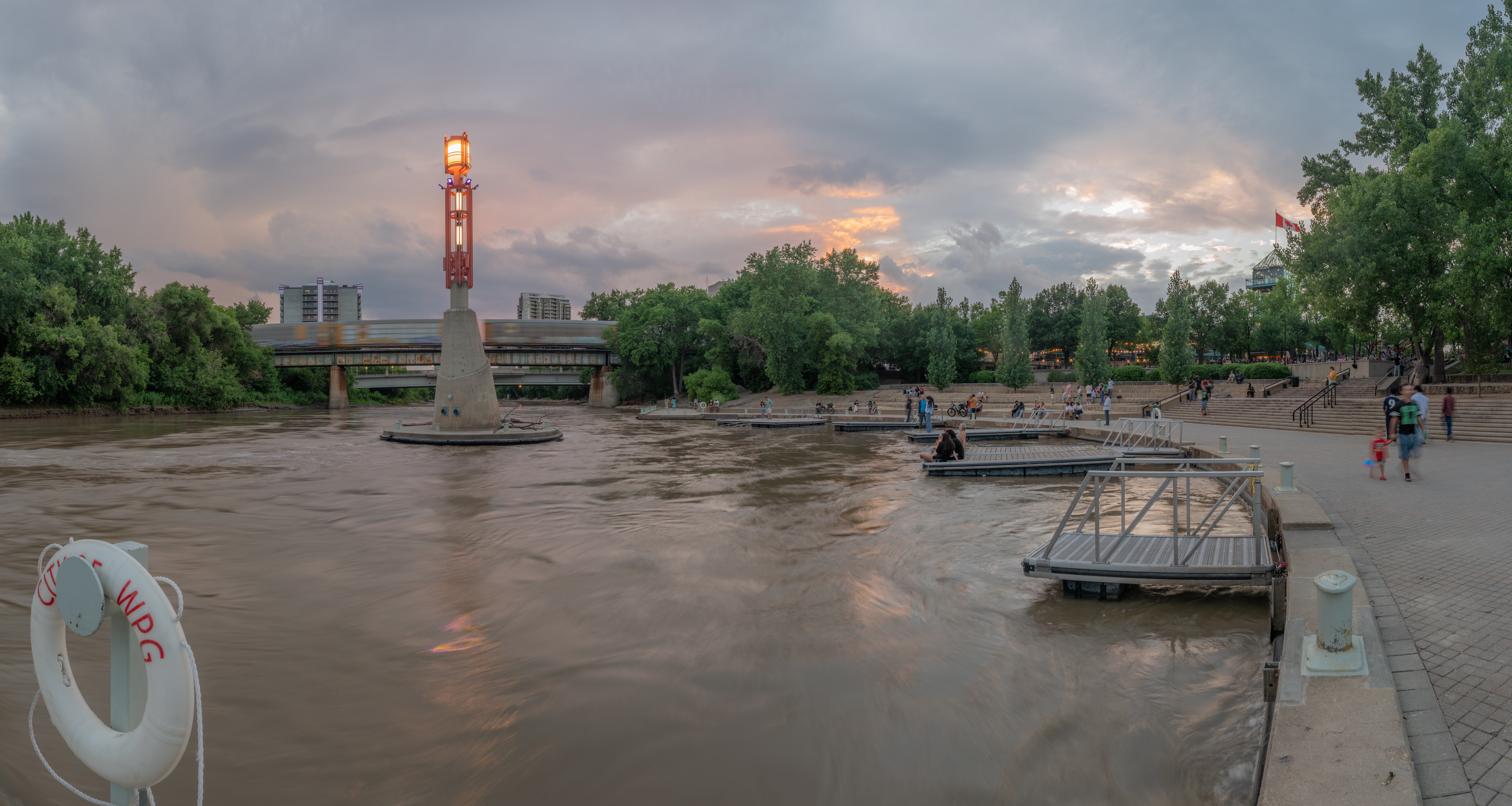
Docks at the Forks following heavy rainfall. The city lies at the bottom of the Red River Valley, a flood plain with a flat topography.

Winnipeg lies at the bottom of the Red River Valley, a flood plain with an extremely flat topography. It is on the eastern edge of the Canadian Prairies in Western Canada and is known as the "Gateway to the West". Winnipeg is bordered by tallgrass prairie to the west and south and the aspen parkland to the northeast, although most of the native prairie grasses have been removed for agriculture and urbanization. It is relatively close to many large Canadian Shield lakes and parks, as well as Lake Winnipeg (the Earth's 11th largest freshwater lake). Winnipeg has North America's largest extant mature urban elm forest. The city has an area of 464.08 square kilometres (179.18 sq mi).

Winnipeg has four major rivers: the Red, Assiniboine, La Salle and Seine. The city was subject to severe flooding in the past. The Red River reached its greatest flood height in 1826. Another large flood in 1950 caused millions of dollars in damage and mass evacuations. This flood prompted Duff Roblin's provincial government to build the Red River Floodway to protect the city. In the 1997 flood, flood control dikes were reinforced and raised using sandbags; Winnipeg suffered limited damage compared to the flood's impact on cities without such structures, such as Grand Forks, North Dakota. The generally flat terrain and the poor drainage of the Red River Valley's clay-based soil also results in many mosquitoes during wetter years.

=== Climate ===
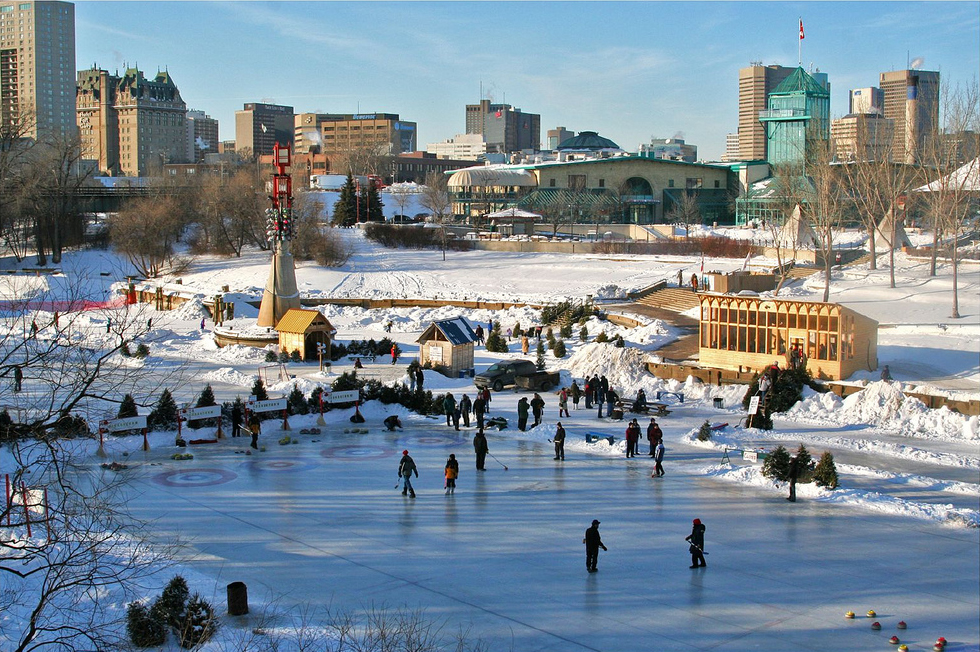
Winters in Winnipeg are cold with little precipitation.

Winnipeg's location in the Canadian Prairies gives it a warm-summer humid continental climate (Köppen: Dfb), with warm, humid summers, and long, severely cold winters. Summers have a July mean average of 19.7 °C (67.5 °F). Winters are the coldest time of year, with the January mean average around −16.4 °C (2.5 °F) and total winter precipitation (December through February) averaging 55.2 millimetres (2.17 in). Temperatures occasionally drop below −40 °C (−40 °F).

On average, there are 317.8 days per year with measurable sunshine, with July seeing the most. With 2,353 hours of sunshine per year, Winnipeg is the second-sunniest city in Canada. Total annual precipitation (both rain and snow) is just over 521 millimetres (20.5 in). Thunderstorms are very common during summer and sometimes severe enough to produce tornadoes. Low wind chill values are a common occurrence in the local climate. The wind chill has gone down as low as −57.1 °C (−70.8 °F), and on average twelve days of the year reach a wind chill below −40 °C (−40 °F). Deaths have been recorded relating to the extreme cold.

The highest temperature ever recorded in Winnipeg was during the 1936 North American heat wave. The temperature reached 42.2 °C (108.0 °F) on 11 July 1936 while the highest minimum temperature, recorded on the following day, 12 July 1936, was 28.3 °C (82.9 °F). The apparent heat can be even more extreme due to bursts of humidity, and on 12 July 2026 a humidex reading of 48.0 °C (118.4 °F) was measured.

The frost-free season is comparatively long for a location with such severe winters. The last spring frost is on average around 23 May, while the first fall frost is on 22 September.

Climate data for Winnipeg (Winnipeg James Armstrong Richardson International Airport) WMO ID: 71852; coordinates 49°55′N 97°14′W; elevation: 238.7 m (783 ft); 1991–2020 normals, extremes 1872–present (Note: Climate data was recorded at St. John's College from March 1872 to July 1938, and at Winnipeg Airport from January 1938 to present.)
Month	Jan	Feb	Mar	Apr	May	Jun	Jul	Aug	Sep	Oct	Nov	Dec	Year
Record high humidex	6.3	11.1	28.0	34.1	40.2	46.1	48.0	45.5	45.9	34.3	23.9	9.3	48.0
Record high °C (°F)	7.8 (46.0)	11.7 (53.1)	23.7 (74.7)	34.3 (93.7)	37.8 (100.0)	38.3 (100.9)	42.2 (108.0)	40.6 (105.1)	38.8 (101.8)	31.1 (88.0)	23.9 (75.0)	11.7 (53.1)	42.2 (108.0)
Mean maximum °C (°F)	1.8 (35.2)	1.9 (35.4)	9.8 (49.6)	21.9 (71.4)	29.1 (84.4)	31.2 (88.2)	31.5 (88.7)	32.6 (90.7)	29.4 (84.9)	22.5 (72.5)	10.7 (51.3)	2.6 (36.7)	34.0 (93.2)
Mean daily maximum °C (°F)	−11.4 (11.5)	−8.8 (16.2)	−0.9 (30.4)	10.0 (50.0)	18.1 (64.6)	23.3 (73.9)	25.8 (78.4)	25.4 (77.7)	19.6 (67.3)	10.4 (50.7)	0.1 (32.2)	−8.2 (17.2)	8.6 (47.5)
Daily mean °C (°F)	−16.3 (2.7)	−14.1 (6.6)	−6.1 (21.0)	3.8 (38.8)	11.1 (52.0)	17.1 (62.8)	19.5 (67.1)	18.7 (65.7)	13.3 (55.9)	5.1 (41.2)	−4.4 (24.1)	−12.7 (9.1)	2.9 (37.2)
Mean daily minimum °C (°F)	−21.2 (−6.2)	−19.3 (−2.7)	−11.2 (11.8)	−2.5 (27.5)	4.2 (39.6)	10.9 (51.6)	13.2 (55.8)	11.9 (53.4)	6.9 (44.4)	−0.2 (31.6)	−8.8 (16.2)	−17.3 (0.9)	−2.8 (27.0)
Mean minimum °C (°F)	−34.9 (−30.8)	−32.3 (−26.1)	−26.5 (−15.7)	−12.6 (9.3)	−5.6 (21.9)	2.1 (35.8)	6.0 (42.8)	4.7 (40.5)	−2.3 (27.9)	−8.9 (16.0)	−20.8 (−5.4)	−31.1 (−24.0)	−36.0 (−32.8)
Record low °C (°F)	−44.4 (−47.9)	−45.0 (−49.0)	−38.9 (−38.0)	−27.8 (−18.0)	−11.7 (10.9)	−6.1 (21.0)	1.1 (34.0)	−1.1 (30.0)	−8.3 (17.1)	−20.6 (−5.1)	−36.7 (−34.1)	−47.8 (−54.0)	−47.8 (−54.0)
Record low wind chill	−56.4	−57.1	−49.4	−35.8	−20.8	−7.9	0.0	0.0	−11.5	−24.2	−48.1	−50.6	−57.1
Average precipitation mm (inches)	18.0 (0.71)	13.3 (0.52)	25.5 (1.00)	32.5 (1.28)	69.5 (2.74)	74.3 (2.93)	76.6 (3.02)	74.3 (2.93)	53.2 (2.09)	38.1 (1.50)	24.7 (0.97)	19.4 (0.76)	519.2 (20.44)
Average rainfall mm (inches)	0.2 (0.01)	3.8 (0.15)	8.8 (0.35)	19.9 (0.78)	66.2 (2.61)	79.3 (3.12)	89.0 (3.50)	80.9 (3.19)	46.6 (1.83)	33.8 (1.33)	7.2 (0.28)	0.5 (0.02)	436.1 (17.17)
Average snowfall cm (inches)	25.0 (9.8)	11.8 (4.6)	19.2 (7.6)	13.6 (5.4)	4.1 (1.6)	0.0 (0.0)	0.0 (0.0)	0.0 (0.0)	0.0 (0.0)	4.2 (1.7)	21.1 (8.3)	27.2 (10.7)	126.2 (49.7)
Average precipitation days (≥ 0.2 mm)	11.9	8.8	9.1	8.4	12.9	13.4	11.9	11.3	10.7	9.8	9.9	11.6	129.8
Average rainy days (≥ 0.2 mm)	0.47	1.0	2.6	5.3	12.9	13.1	11.9	11.3	10.5	7.2	2.9	0.75	79.9
Average snowy days (≥ 0.2 cm)	12.2	7.8	7.6	3.2	0.82	0.0	0.0	0.0	0.0	2.1	8.7	11.6	53.9
Average relative humidity (%) (at 1500 LST)	72.7	71.0	67.9	49.1	47.8	54.6	55.7	52.3	54.7	61.0	72.6	76.5	61.3
Average dew point °C (°F)	−19.2 (−2.6)	−17.0 (1.4)	−9.4 (15.1)	−3.0 (26.6)	3.6 (38.5)	11.1 (52.0)	14.4 (57.9)	13.0 (55.4)	8.0 (46.4)	0.8 (33.4)	−7.1 (19.2)	−15.1 (4.8)	−1.7 (28.9)
Mean monthly sunshine hours	114.7	133.9	181.9	241.4	285.2	276.3	308.3	281.4	189.0	147.4	93.9	99.5	2,352.9
Percentage possible sunshine	42.9	47.2	49.5	58.6	59.8	56.6	62.6	62.8	49.8	44.1	34.4	39.2	50.6
Source 1: Environment and Climate Change Canada (sun 1981–2010)
Source 2: weatherstats.ca (for dewpoint and monthly/yearly average absolute maximum/minimum temperature)

=== Cityscape ===
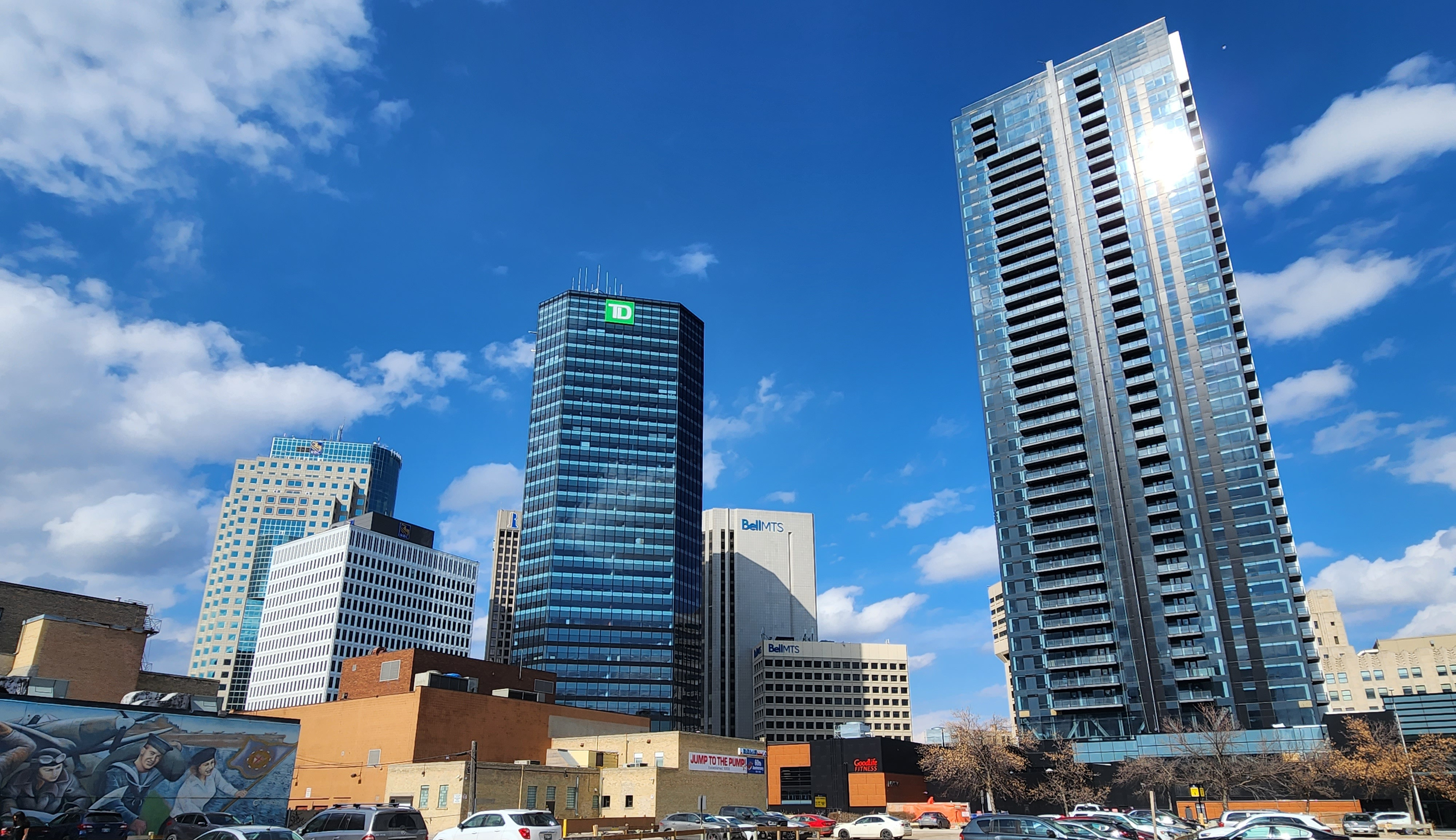
Centred on the intersection of Portage and Main, Downtown Winnipeg is the city's central business district.

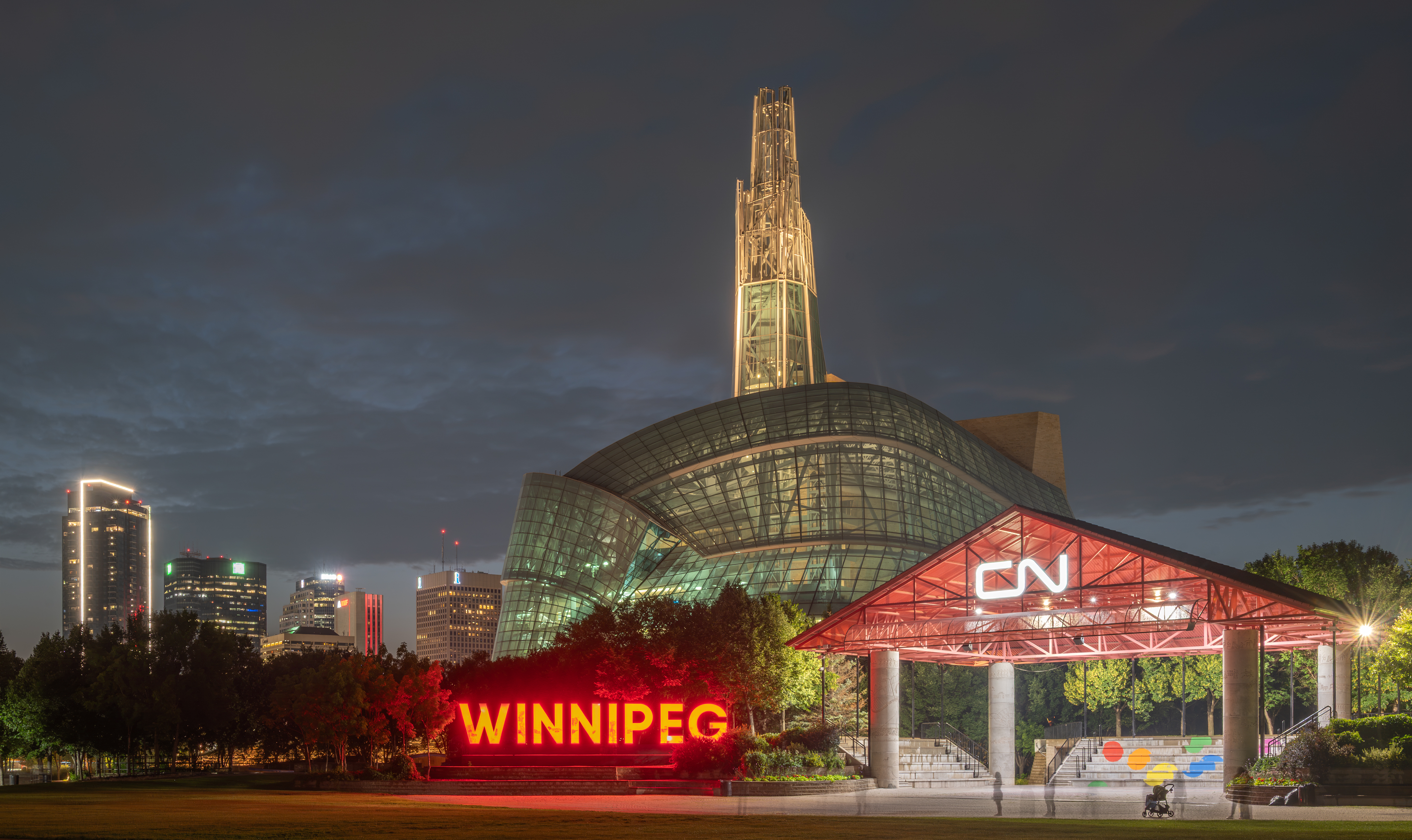
The Canadian Museum for Human Rights and downtown Winnipeg skyline at night, viewed from the Forks.

There are officially 237 neighbourhoods in Winnipeg. Downtown Winnipeg, the city's financial heart and economic core, is centred on the intersection of Portage Avenue and Main Street and covers about 2.6 square kilometres (1.0 sq mi). More than 72,000 people work downtown, and over 40,000 students attend classes at its universities and colleges.

Downtown Winnipeg's Exchange District is named after the area's original grain exchange, which operated from 1880 to 1913. The 30-block district received National Historic Site of Canada status in 1997; it includes North America's most extensive collection of early 20th-century terracotta and cut stone architecture, Stephen Juba Park, and Old Market Square. Other major downtown areas are the Forks, Central Park, Broadway-Assiniboine and Chinatown. Many of Downtown Winnipeg's major buildings are linked with the Winnipeg Walkway. Residential neighbourhoods surround the downtown in all directions; expansion is greatest to the south and west, although several areas remain underdeveloped. The city's largest park, Assiniboine Park, houses the Assiniboine Park Zoo and the Leo Mol Sculpture Garden. Other large city parks include Kildonan Park and St. Vital Park. The city's major commercial areas are Polo Park, Kildonan Crossing, South St. Vital, Garden City (West Kildonan), Pembina Strip, Kenaston Smart Centre, and Osborne Village. The main cultural and nightlife areas are the Exchange District, the Forks, Osborne Village and Corydon Village (both in Fort Rouge), Sargent and Ellice Avenues (West End) and Old St. Boniface. Osborne Village is Winnipeg's most densely populated neighbourhood and one of the most densely populated neighbourhoods in Western Canada.

== Demographics ==
Population growth since 1871
Year	Pop.	±%
1871	241	—
1881	7,995	+3217.4%
1891	26,529	+231.8%
1901	42,540	+60.4%
1911	136,035	+219.8%
1921	179,097	+31.7%
1931	218,785	+22.2%
1941	221,969	+1.5%
1951	235,710	+6.2%
1961	265,420	+12.6%
1971	246,246	−7.2%
1981	564,373	+129.2%
1991	616,790	+9.3%
2001	619,544	+0.4%
2011	663,617	+7.1%
2021	749,607	+13.0%
The drastic population increase between 1971 and 1981 was due in part to Winnipeg's amalgamation in 1972. Source:

In the 2021 Census of Population conducted by Statistics Canada, Winnipeg had a population of 749,607 living in 300,431 of its 315,465 total private dwellings, a change of 6.3% from its 2016 population of 705,244. With a land area of 461.78 km^{2} (178.29 sq mi), it had a population density of 1,623.3/km^{2} (4,204.3/sq mi) in 2021. As of the 2021 census, 16.6 percent of residents were 14 years old or younger, 66.4 percent were between 15 and 64 years old, and 17.0 percent were 65 or over. The average age of a Winnipegger was 40.3.

At the census metropolitan area (CMA) level in the 2021 census, the Winnipeg CMA had a population of 834,678 living in 330,326 of its 347,144 total private dwellings, a change of 6.6% from its 2016 population of 783,099. With a land area of 5,285.46 km^{2} (2,040.73 sq mi), it had a population density of 157.9/km^{2} (409.0/sq mi) in 2021.

In 2021 Winnipeg represented 54.9% of the population of the province of Manitoba, the highest population concentration in one city of any province in Canada. Apart from the city of Winnipeg, the Winnipeg CMA includes the rural municipalities of Springfield, St. Clements, Taché, East St. Paul, Macdonald, Ritchot, West St. Paul, Headingley, the Brokenhead 4 reserve, Rosser and St. François Xavier. Statistics Canada's estimate of the Winnipeg CMA population as of 1 July 2020 is 850,056, making it the 7th largest CMA in Canada.

Winnipeg has a significant and increasing Indigenous population, with both the highest percentage of Indigenous peoples (12.4%) for any major Canadian city, and the highest total number of Indigenous peoples (90,995) for any single non-reserve municipality. The Indigenous population grew by 22% between 2001 and 2006, compared to an increase of 3% for the city as a whole; this population tends to be younger and less wealthy than non-Indigenous residents. Winnipeg also has the highest Métis population in both percentage (6.5%) and numbers (47,915); the growth rate for this population between 2001 and 2006 was 30%.

The 2021 census reported that immigrants comprised 201,040 persons or 27.3% of the total population of Winnipeg. Of the total immigrant population, the top countries of origin were the Philippines (62,100 persons or 30.9%), India (27,605 persons or 13.7%), and China (8,900 persons or 4.4%). The city receives over 10,000 net international immigrants per year. Winnipeg has the greatest percentage of Filipino residents (11.3%) of any major Canadian city, although Toronto has more Filipinos by total population. As of 2021, 34% of residents were of a visible minority.

More than a hundred languages are spoken in Winnipeg, of which the most common is English: 65 percent of Winnipeggers speak English as their native language (of Canada's official languages, English and French, 95 percent learned English first), and 2.8 percent have a first language of French. The St. Boniface neighbourhood of Winnipeg is home to the largest Francophone community in Western Canada, where 25 percent of local residents can speak French. Other languages spoken as a mother tongue in Winnipeg include Tagalog (6.0%), Punjabi (4.1%), and Mandarin (1.5%). Several Indigenous languages are also spoken, such as Ojibwe (0.2%) and Cree (0.1%).

The 2021 Census reported the religious make-up of Winnipeg as: 50.4% Christian, including 24.0% Catholic, 4.0% United Church, and 2.7% Anglican; 4.4% Sikh; 3.3% Muslim; 2.0% Hindu; 1.5% Jewish; 0.9% Buddhist; 0.4% traditional (aboriginal) spirituality; 0.7% other; and 36.4% no religious affiliation.

== Economy ==
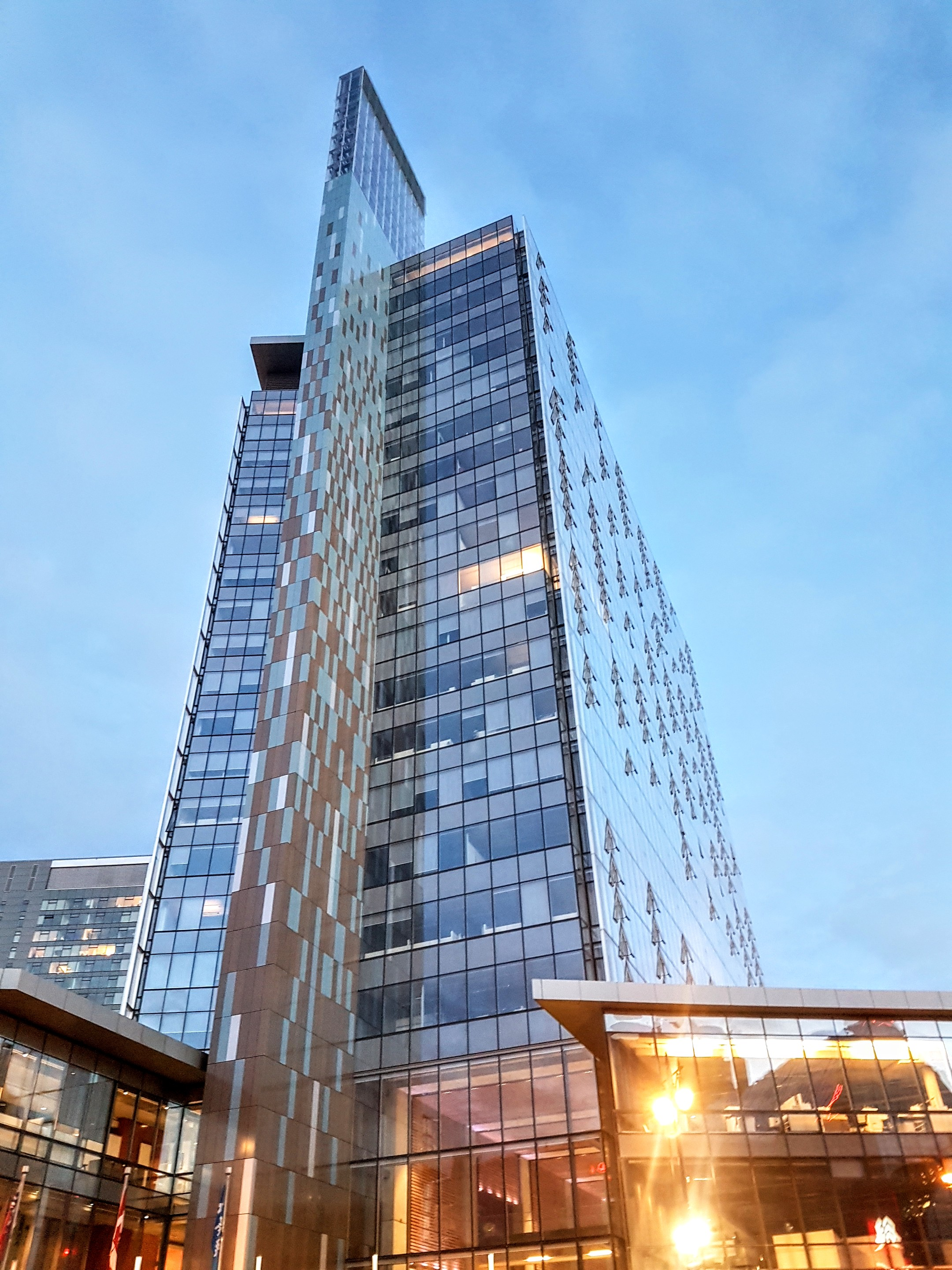
Manitoba Hydro operates out of Manitoba Hydro Place in Winnipeg.

Winnipeg is an economic base and regional centre. It has a diversified economy, with major employment in the health care and social assistance (14%), retail (11%), manufacturing (8%), and public administration (8%) sectors. There were approximately 450,500 jobs in the city as of 2019. Some of Winnipeg's largest employers are government and government-funded institutions, including the Province of Manitoba, the University of Manitoba, the City of Winnipeg, Manitoba Hydro, and Manitoba Liquor & Lotteries Corporation. Major private-sector employers include Canad Corporation of Manitoba, Canada Life Assurance Company, StandardAero, and SkipTheDishes. The GDP for the census metropolitan area was CA$45.0 billion as of 2020. The city had an unemployment rate of 5.3% in 2019, compared to a national rate of 5.7%. Household income per capita was $47,824, compared to $49,744 nationally. The Royal Canadian Mint, established in 1976, produces all circulating coinage in Canada. The facility, located in southeastern Winnipeg, also produces coins for many other countries.

In 2012, Winnipeg was ranked by KPMG as the least expensive location to do business in western Canada. Like many prairie cities, Winnipeg has a relatively low cost of living. The average house price in Winnipeg was $301,518 as of 2018. As of May 2014, the Consumer Price Index was 125.8 relative to 2002 prices, reflecting consumer costs at the Canadian average.

== Culture ==
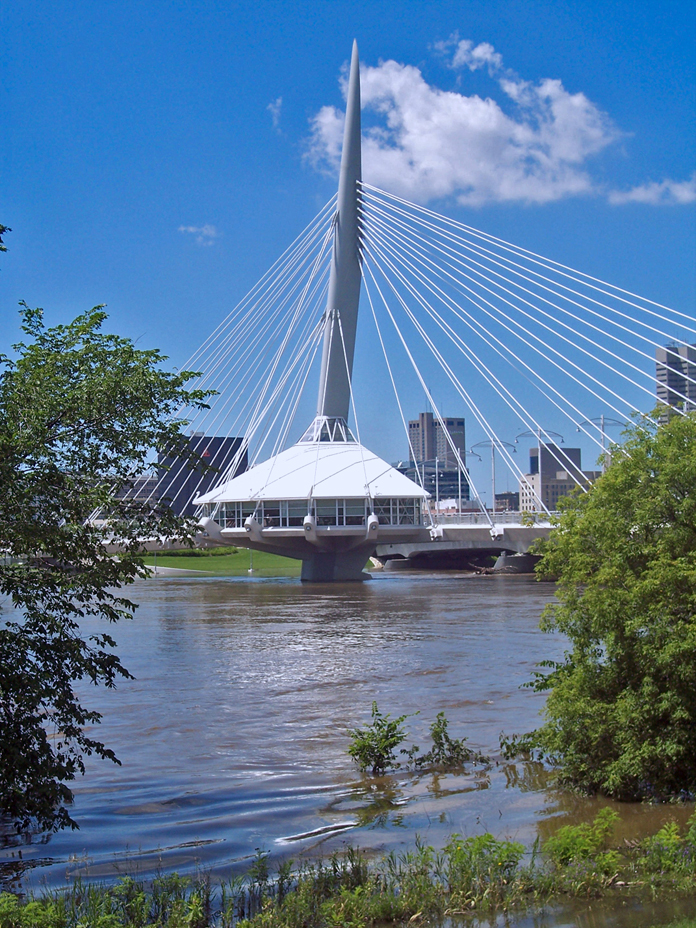
The Esplanade Riel is a landmark and pedestrian bridge in the city. It connects downtown Winnipeg with the St. Boniface neighbourhood.

Winnipeg was named the Cultural Capital of Canada in 2010 by Canadian Heritage. As of 2021, there are 26 National Historic Sites of Canada in Winnipeg. One of these, The Forks, attracts four million visitors a year. It is home to the City television studio, the Nestaweya River Trail, Manitoba Theatre for Young People, the Winnipeg International Children's Festival, and the Manitoba Children's Museum. It also features a 2,800-square-metre (30,000 sq ft) skate plaza, a 790-square-metre (8,500 sq ft) bowl complex, which features a mural of Winnipeg skateboarding pioneer Jai Pereira, the Esplanade Riel bridge, a river walkway, Shaw Park, and the Canadian Museum for Human Rights. The Winnipeg Public Library is a public library network with 20 branches throughout the city, including the main Millennium Library.

Winnipeg the Bear, which would become the inspiration for part of the name of Winnie-the-Pooh, was purchased in Ontario by Lieutenant Harry Colebourn of the Fort Garry Horse. He named the bear after the regiment's hometown of Winnipeg. A. A. Milne later wrote a series of books featuring the fictional Winnie-the-Pooh. The series' illustrator, Ernest H. Shepard created the only known oil painting of Winnipeg's adopted fictional bear, which is displayed in Assiniboine Park.

The city has developed many distinct dishes and cooking styles, notably in the areas of confectionery and hot-smoked fish. Both the First Nations and more recent Eastern Canadian, European, and Asian immigrants have helped shape Winnipeg's dining scene, giving birth to dishes such as the desserts schmoo torte and wafer pie.

The Winnipeg Art Gallery is Western Canada's oldest public art gallery, founded in 1912. It is the sixth-largest in the country and includes the world's largest public collection of contemporary Inuit art. Since the late 1970s Winnipeg has also had an active artist run centre culture.

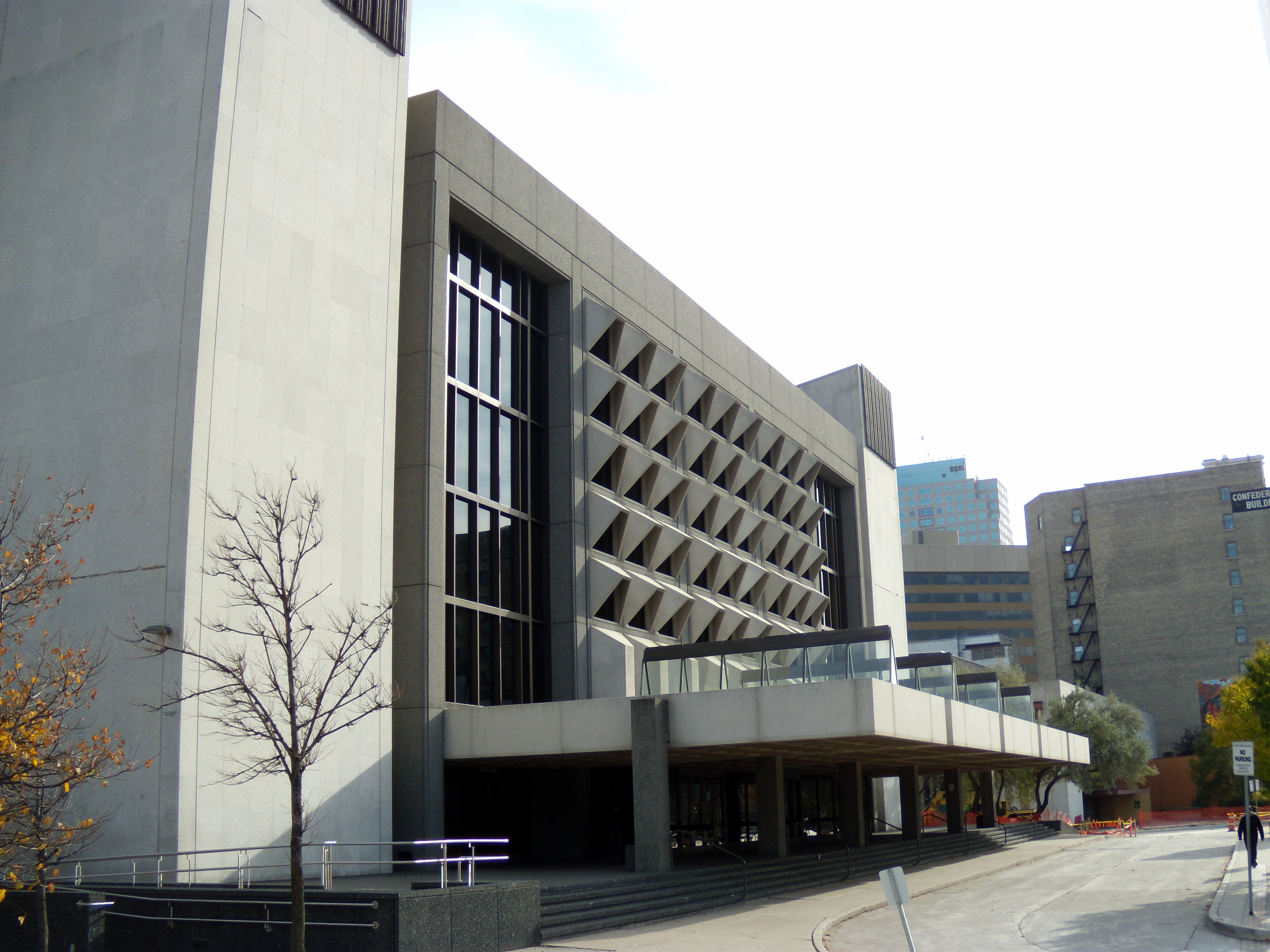
Centennial Concert Hall is a performing arts centre that is home to the Manitoba Opera, Royal Winnipeg Ballet, and the Winnipeg Symphony Orchestra.

Winnipeg's three largest performing arts venues, the Centennial Concert Hall, Royal Manitoba Theatre Centre and the Pantages Playhouse Theatre, are downtown. The Royal Manitoba is Canada's oldest English-language regional theatre, with over 250 performances yearly. The Pantages Playhouse Theatre opened as a vaudeville house in 1913. Other city theatres include the Burton Cummings Theatre (a National Historic Site of Canada built in 1906) and Prairie Theatre Exchange. Le Cercle Molière, based in St Boniface, is Canada's oldest theatre company, founded in 1925. Rainbow Stage is a musical theatre production company based in Kildonan Park that produces professional, live Broadway musical shows and is Canada's longest-surviving outdoor theatre. The Manitoba Theatre for Young People at the Forks is one of only two Theatres for Young Audiences in Canada with a permanent residence and the only Theatre for Young Audiences that offers a full season of plays for teenagers. The Winnipeg Jewish Theatre is the only professional theatre in Canada dedicated to Jewish themes. Shakespeare in the Ruins (SIR) presents adaptations of Shakespeare plays.

Winnipeg has hosted numerous Hollywood productions: Shall We Dance? (2004), Capote (2005), The Assassination of Jesse James by the Coward Robert Ford (2007), and A Dog's Purpose (2017), among others were filmed in the city. The Winnipeg Film Group has produced numerous award-winning films. There are several TV and film production companies in Winnipeg: the most prominent are Farpoint Films, Frantic Films, Buffalo Gal Pictures, and Les Productions Rivard. Guy Maddin's My Winnipeg, an independent film released in 2008, is a comedic rumination on the city's history.

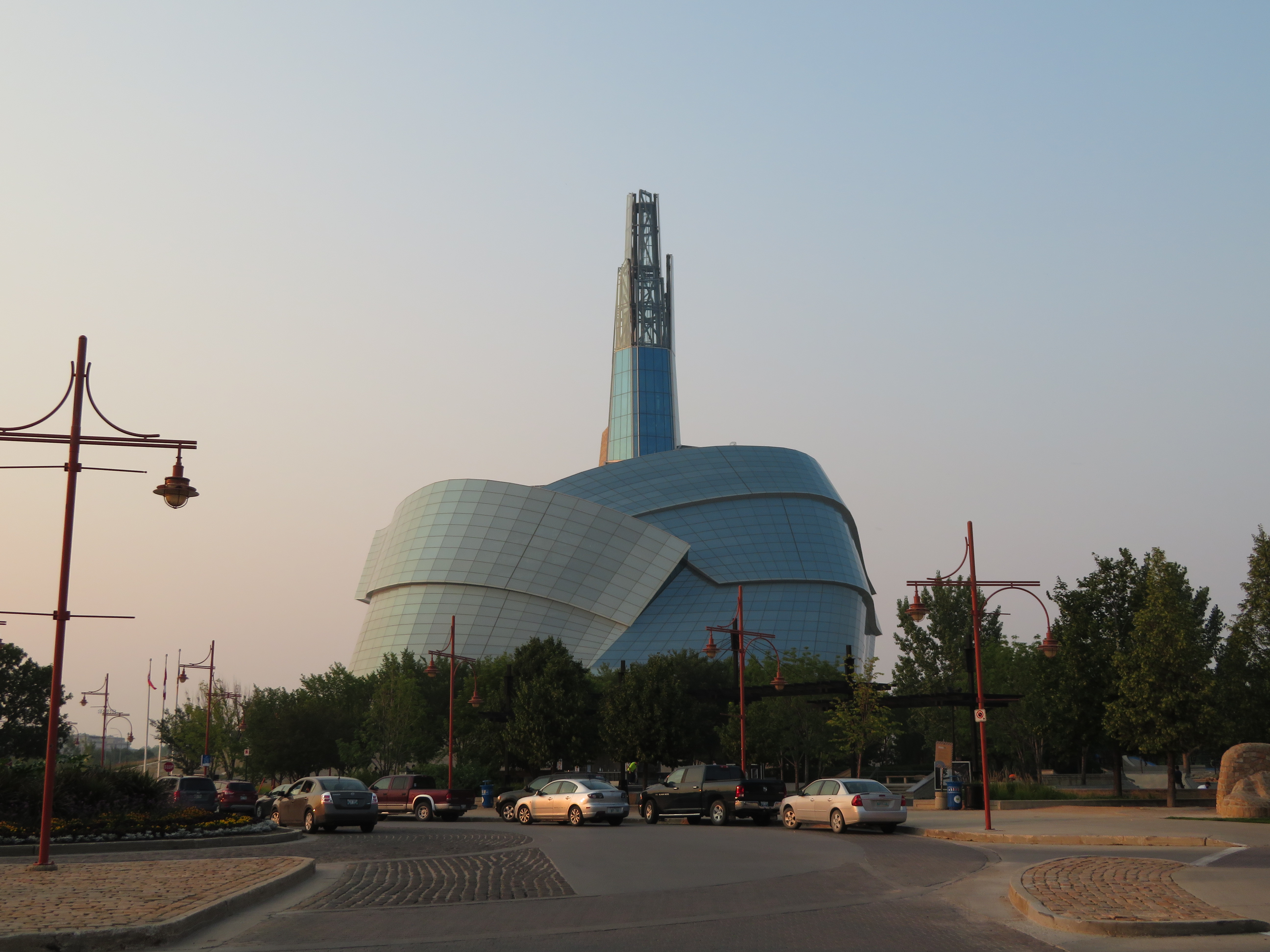
Located in Winnipeg, the Canadian Museum for Human Rights is a national museum of Canada.

The Winnipeg Symphony Orchestra is the largest and oldest professional musical ensemble in Winnipeg. The Manitoba Chamber Orchestra runs a series of chamber orchestral concerts each year. Manitoba Opera is Manitoba's only full-time professional opera company. Among the most notable musical acts associated with Winnipeg are Bachman–Turner Overdrive, The Guess Who, Neil Young, The Weakerthans, the Crash Test Dummies, Propagandhi, Bif Naked, and The Watchmen among many others. Winnipeg also has a significant place in Canadian jazz history, being the location of Canada's first jazz concert in 1914 at the Pantages Playhouse Theatre.

The Royal Winnipeg Ballet (RWB) is Canada's oldest ballet company and the longest continuously operating ballet company in North America. It was the first organization to be granted a royal title by Queen Elizabeth II and has included notable dancers such as Evelyn Hart and Mikhail Baryshnikov. The RWB also runs a full-time classical dance school.

The Manitoba Museum, the city's largest museum, depicts the history of the city and province. The full-size replica of the ship Nonsuch is the museum's showcase piece. The Manitoba Children's Museum is a nonprofit children's museum at the Forks that features twelve permanent galleries. The Canadian Museum for Human Rights is the only Canadian national museum for human rights and the only national museum west of Ottawa. The federal government contributed $100 million towards the estimated $311 million project. Construction of the museum began on 1 April 2008, and the museum opened to the public 27 September 2014.

The Royal Aviation Museum of Western Canada, near Winnipeg's James Richardson International Airport, features military jets, commercial aircraft, Canada's first helicopter, the "flying saucer" Avrocar, flight simulators, and a Black Brant rocket built in Manitoba by Bristol Aerospace. The Winnipeg Railway Museum at Via Rail Station has a variety of locomotives, notably the Countess of Dufferin, the first steam locomotive in Western Canada.

=== Festivals ===
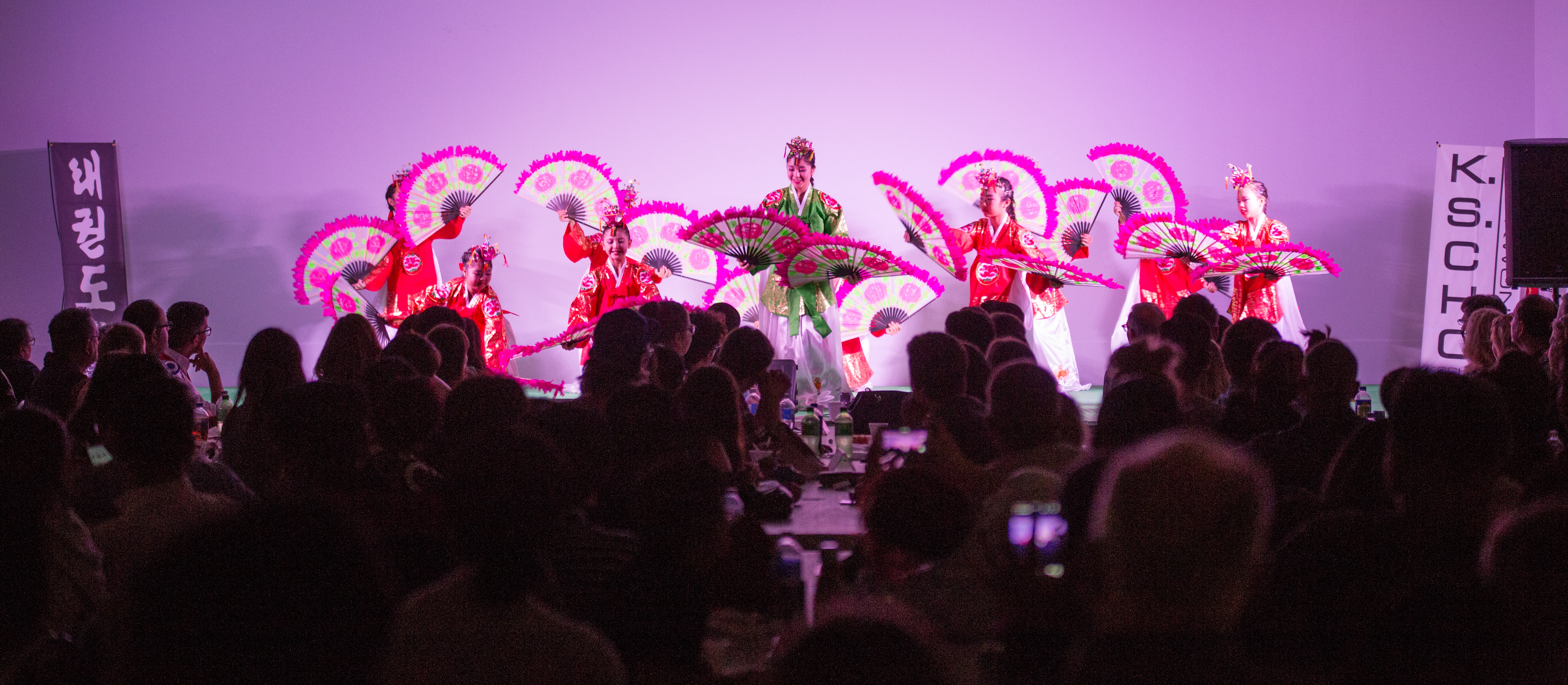
The Korean Pavilion during Folklorama

Festival du Voyageur, Western Canada's largest winter festival, celebrates the early French explorers of the Red River Valley. Folklorama is the largest and longest-running cultural celebration festival in the world. The Jazz Winnipeg Festival and the Winnipeg Folk Festival both celebrate Winnipeg's music community. The Winnipeg Music Festival offers a competition venue for amateur musicians. The Winnipeg Fringe Theatre Festival is the second-largest alternative theatre festival in North America. The Winnipeg International Writers Festival (also called Plume WInnipeg) brings writers to Winnipeg for workshops and readings. The LGBT community in the city is served by Pride Winnipeg, an annual gay pride festival and parade, and Reel Pride, the oldest LGBTQ2s+ film festival in Canada.

=== Sports ===
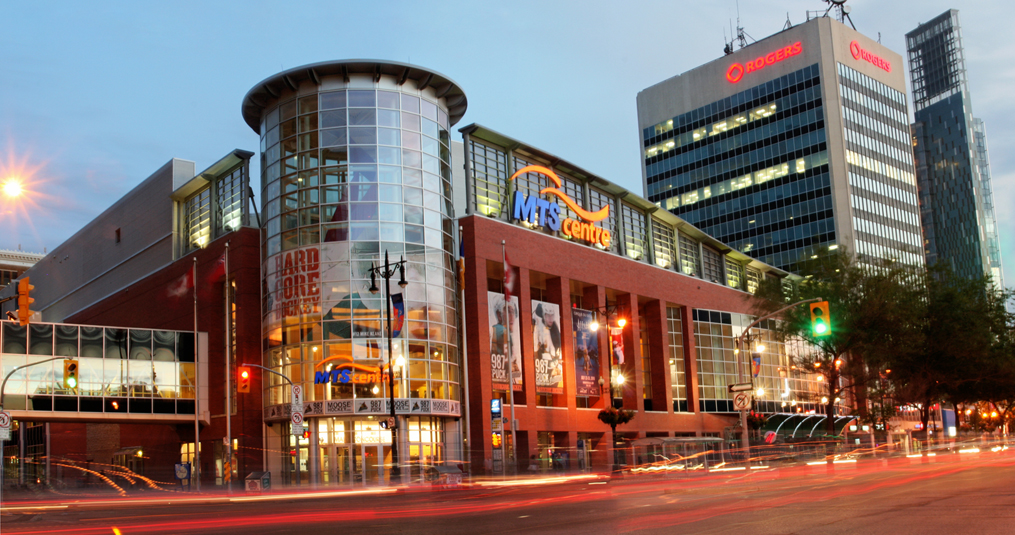
Canada Life Centre is an indoor arena in downtown Winnipeg. It is the home arena of the Winnipeg Jets (NHL) and the Manitoba Moose (AHL).

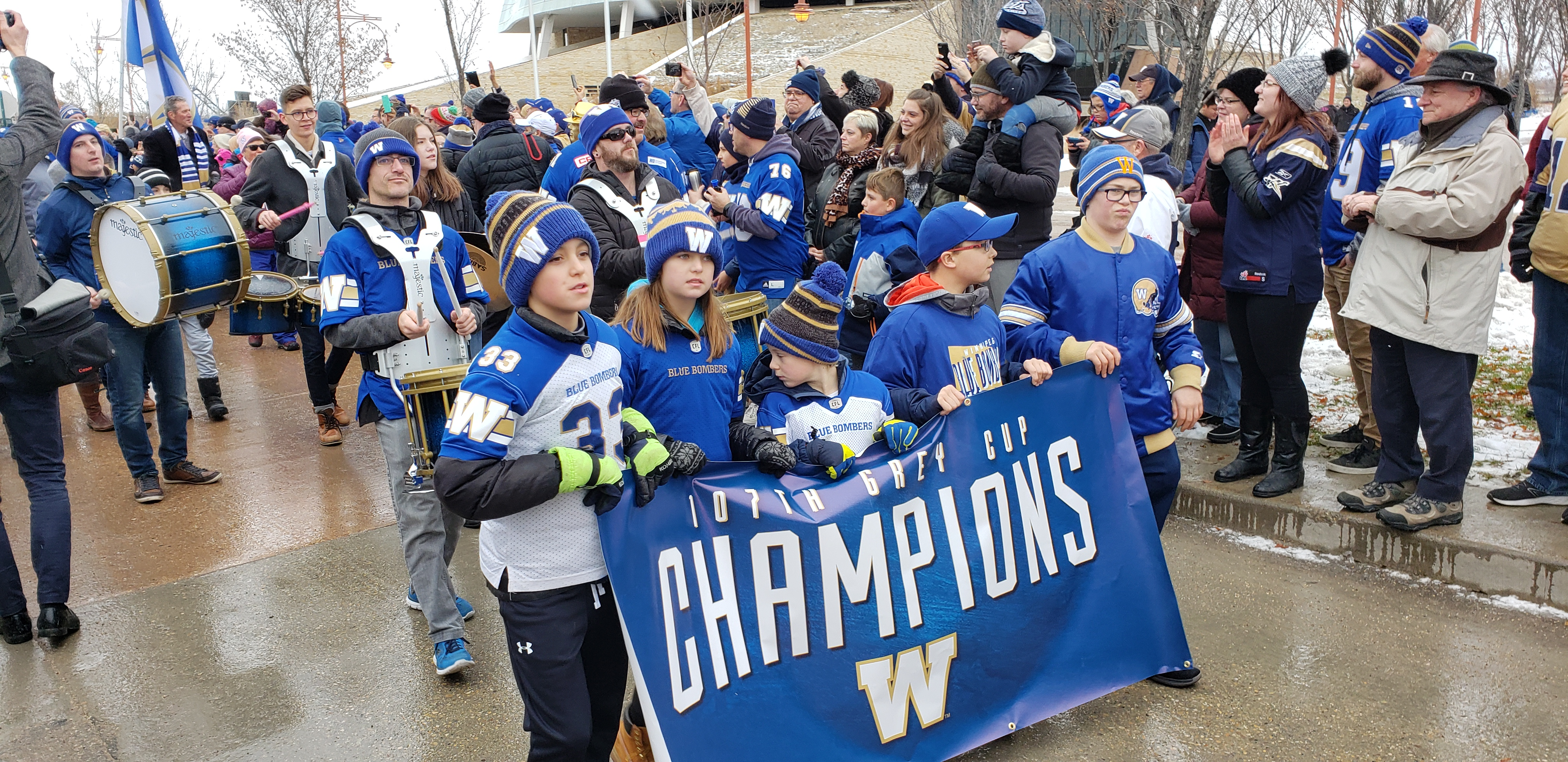
Marchers at the 2019 Grey Cup parade for the Winnipeg Blue Bombers

Winnipeg has been home to several professional hockey teams. The Winnipeg Jets of the National Hockey League (NHL) have called the city home since 2011. The original Winnipeg Jets, the city's former NHL team, left for Phoenix, Arizona, after the 1995–96 season due to mounting financial troubles, despite a campaign effort to "Save the Jets." The Jets play at Canada Life Centre, which is ranked the world's 19th-busiest arena among non-sporting touring events, 13th-busiest among facilities in North America, and 3rd-busiest in Canada as of 2009.

Past hockey teams based in Winnipeg include the Winnipeg Maroons, Winnipeg Warriors, three-time Stanley Cup Champion Winnipeg Victorias and the Winnipeg Falcons, who were the gold medalists representing Canada at the 1920 Olympics in Antwerp, Belgium. Another professional ice hockey team in Winnipeg is the Manitoba Moose, the American Hockey League primary affiliate of the Winnipeg Jets that the same group owns. On the international stage, Winnipeg has hosted national and world hockey championships on a number of occasions, most notably the 1999 World Junior Hockey Championship and 2007 Women's World Hockey Championship. The city is also home to the Manitoba Herd team in the National Ringette League.

The Winnipeg Blue Bombers play in the Canadian Football League. They are twelve-time Grey Cup champions, most recently in 2021. From 1953 to 2012, the Blue Bombers called Canad Inns Stadium home; they have since moved to Princess Auto Stadium, which opened in 2013. The facility is also the home of the Winnipeg Rifles of the Canadian Junior Football League. Winnipeg is the only city with two women's football teams in the Western Women's Canadian Football League: the Manitoba Fearless and the Winnipeg Wolfpack. The University of Manitoba Bisons and the University of Winnipeg Wesmen represent the city in university-level sports. In soccer, it is represented by FC Manitoba in the USL League Two. Winnipeg has been home to several professional baseball teams, most recently the Winnipeg Goldeyes, who play at Shaw Park.

Winnipeg was the first Canadian city to host the Pan American Games, and the second city to host the event twice, in 1967 and again in 1999. The Pan Am Pool, built for the 1967 Pan Am Games, hosts aquatic events, including diving, speed swimming, synchronized swimming and water polo. Other notable sporting events hosted by Winnipeg include the 2015 FIFA Women's World Cup (co-hosted with Edmonton, Montreal, Vancouver, Ottawa, and Moncton) the 2017 Canada Summer Games the 2023 World Police and Fire Games, and several Grey Cup finals.

Professional sports teams
Club	Sport	League	Venue	Established	Championships
Winnipeg Blue Bombers	Canadian football	CFL	Osborne Stadium (1935–1952); Winnipeg Stadium (1953–2012); Princess Auto Stadium (2013–present)	1930	12
Winnipeg Jets	Ice hockey	WHA (1972–1979); NHL (1979–1996, 2011–present)	Winnipeg Arena (1972–1996); Canada Life Centre (2011–present)	Original: 1972–1996; Current: 2011	3 (WHA Avco Cup); 0
Winnipeg Goldeyes	Baseball	Northern League (1994–2010); American Association (2011–present)	Blue Cross Park	1994	4
Winnipeg Sea Bears	Basketball	CEBL	Canada Life Centre	2022	1
Manitoba Moose	Ice hockey	IHL (1996–2001); AHL (2001–2011, 2015–present)	Winnipeg Arena (1996–2004); Canada Life Centre (2004–2011, 2015–present)	1996–2011, 2015–present	0
Winnipeg Ember FC	Soccer	NSL	Ralph Cantafio Soccer Complex	2026	0

== Local media ==
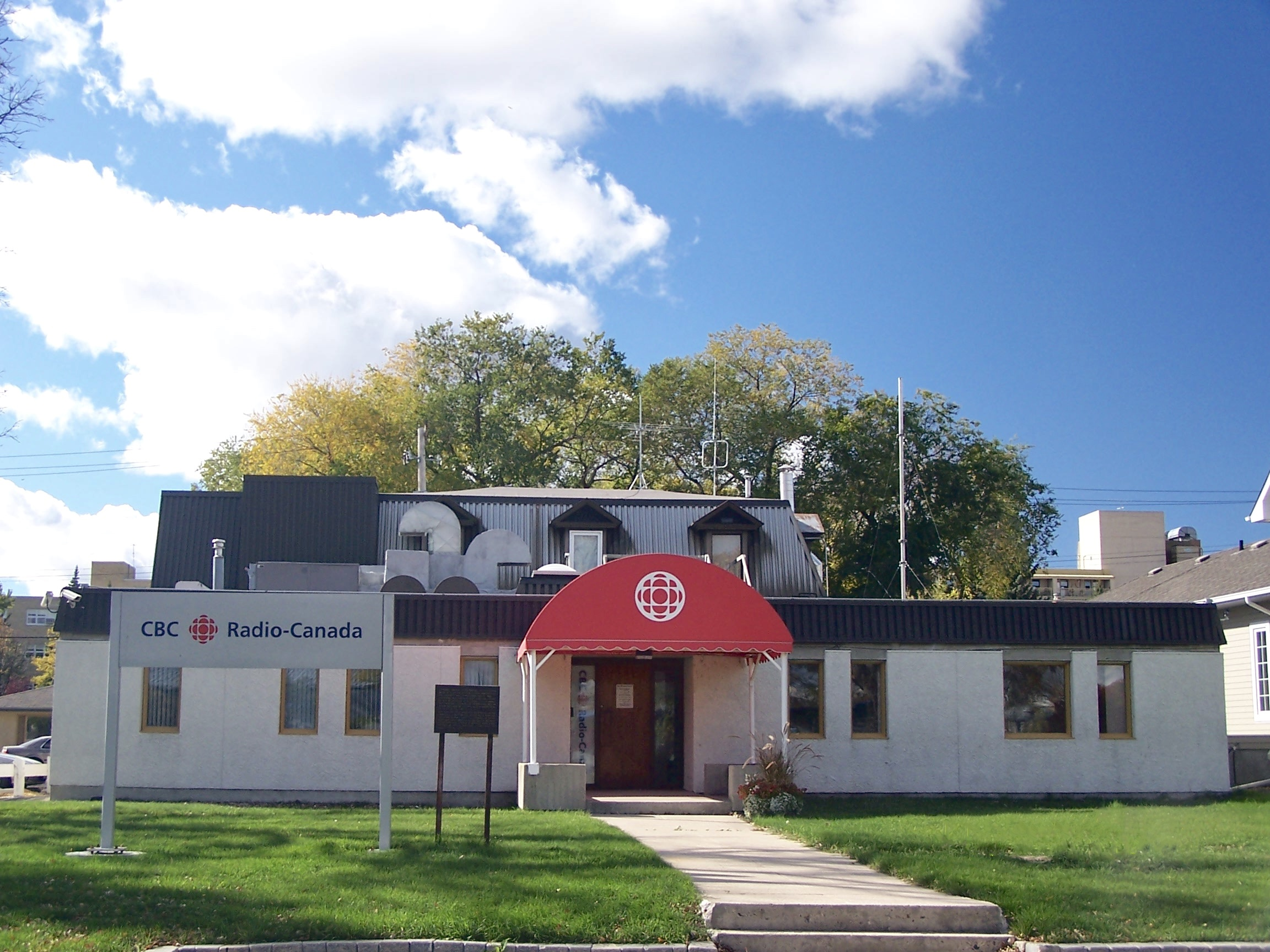
CBC Radio-Canada studio

Winnipeg has two daily newspapers: the Winnipeg Free Press and the Winnipeg Sun. There are also several ethnic weekly newspapers.

Radio broadcasting in Winnipeg began in 1922; by 1923, government-owned CKY held a monopoly position that lasted until after the Second World War. Winnipeg is home to 33 AM and FM radio stations, two of which are French-language stations. CBC Radio One and CBC Radio 2 broadcast local and national programming in the city. NCI is devoted to Indigenous programming.

Television broadcasting in Winnipeg started in 1954. The federal government refused to license any private broadcaster until the Canadian Broadcasting Corporation had created a national network. In May 1954, CBWT went on the air broadcasting four hours daily. There are now five English-language stations and one French-language station based in Winnipeg. Additionally, some American network affiliates are available over-the-air.

== Law and government ==
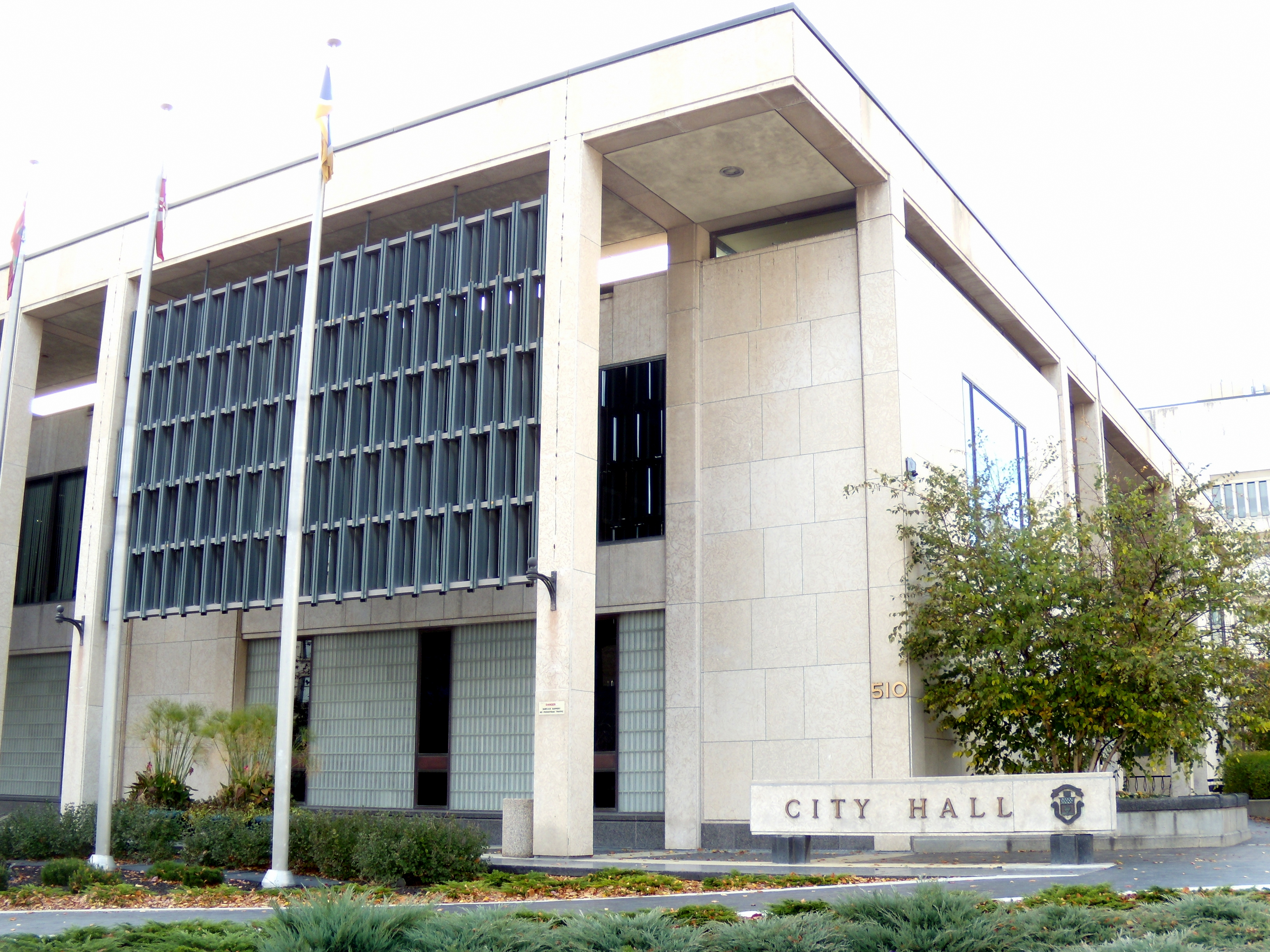
Winnipeg City Hall is the seat of municipal government.

Since 1992, the city of Winnipeg has been represented by 15 city councillors and a mayor, both elected every four years. The present mayor, Scott Gillingham, was first elected to office in 2022. The city is a single-tier municipality, governed by a mayor-council system. The structure of the municipal government is set by the provincial legislature in the City of Winnipeg Charter Act, which replaced the old City of Winnipeg Act in 2003. The mayor is elected by direct popular vote to serve as the chief executive of the city. At Council meetings, the mayor has one of 16 votes. The city governance functions off the "strong-mayor" model, which allows for a "two-tiered system" or voting block between the councillors who are on or not on the Executive Policy Committee. The City Council is a unicameral legislative body, representing geographical wards throughout the city. In provincial politics, Winnipeg is represented by 32 of the 57 provincial Members of the Legislative Assembly (MLAs) in the 43rd Manitoba Legislature. As of 2023, Winnipeg districts are represented by 28 members of the New Democratic Party (NDP), three by the Progressive Conservative Party, and one by the Liberal Party.

In federal politics, as of 2025, Winnipeg is represented by eight Members of Parliament: five Liberals, two Conservatives and one New Democrat. There are six Senators representing Manitoba in Ottawa.

=== Crime ===
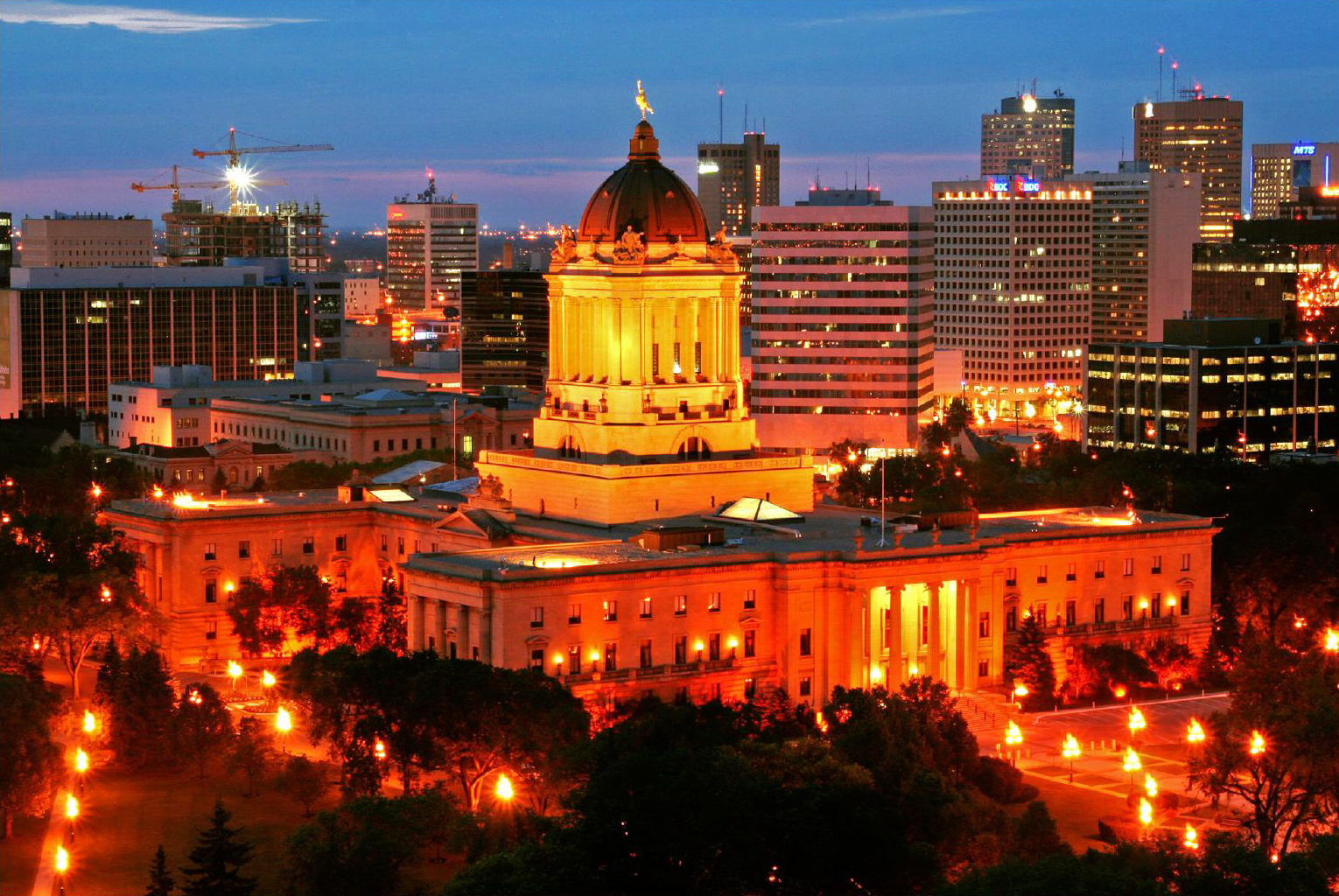
Winnipeg is home to the Manitoba Legislative Building, which houses the Legislative Assembly of Manitoba.

From 2007 to 2011, Winnipeg was the "murder capital" of Canada, with the highest per-capita rate of homicides; as of 2022, with a homicide rate of 7.2 per 100,000, it is in second place, behind Thunder Bay (13.7 per 100,000). In 2019, Winnipeg had the 13th-highest violent crime index in Canada, and the highest robbery rate. Winnipeg was the "violent crime capital" of Canada in 2020 according to the Statistics Canada police-reported violent crime severity index. Despite high overall violent crime rates, crime in Winnipeg is mostly concentrated in the inner city, which makes up only 19% of the population but was the site of 86.4% of the city's shootings, 66.5% of the robberies, 63.3% of the homicides and 59.5% of the sexual assaults in 2012.

From the early 1990s to the mid-2000s, Winnipeg had a significant auto-theft problem, with the rate peaking at 2,165.0 per 100,000 residents in 2006 compared to 487 auto-thefts per 100,000 residents for Canada as a whole. To combat auto theft, Manitoba Public Insurance established financial incentives for motor vehicle owners to install ignition immobilizers in their vehicles, and now requires owners of high-risk vehicles to install immobilizers. These initiatives resulted in an 80% decrease in auto thefts between 2006 and 2011.

As of 2018, the Winnipeg Police Service had 1,914 police officers, which is one officer per 551 city residents, and cost taxpayers $290,564,015. In November 2013, the national police union reviewed the Winnipeg Police Force and found high average response times for several categories of calls. In 2017, the city started to deal with an increasingly large methamphetamine problem, fuelling violent crime.

== Education ==
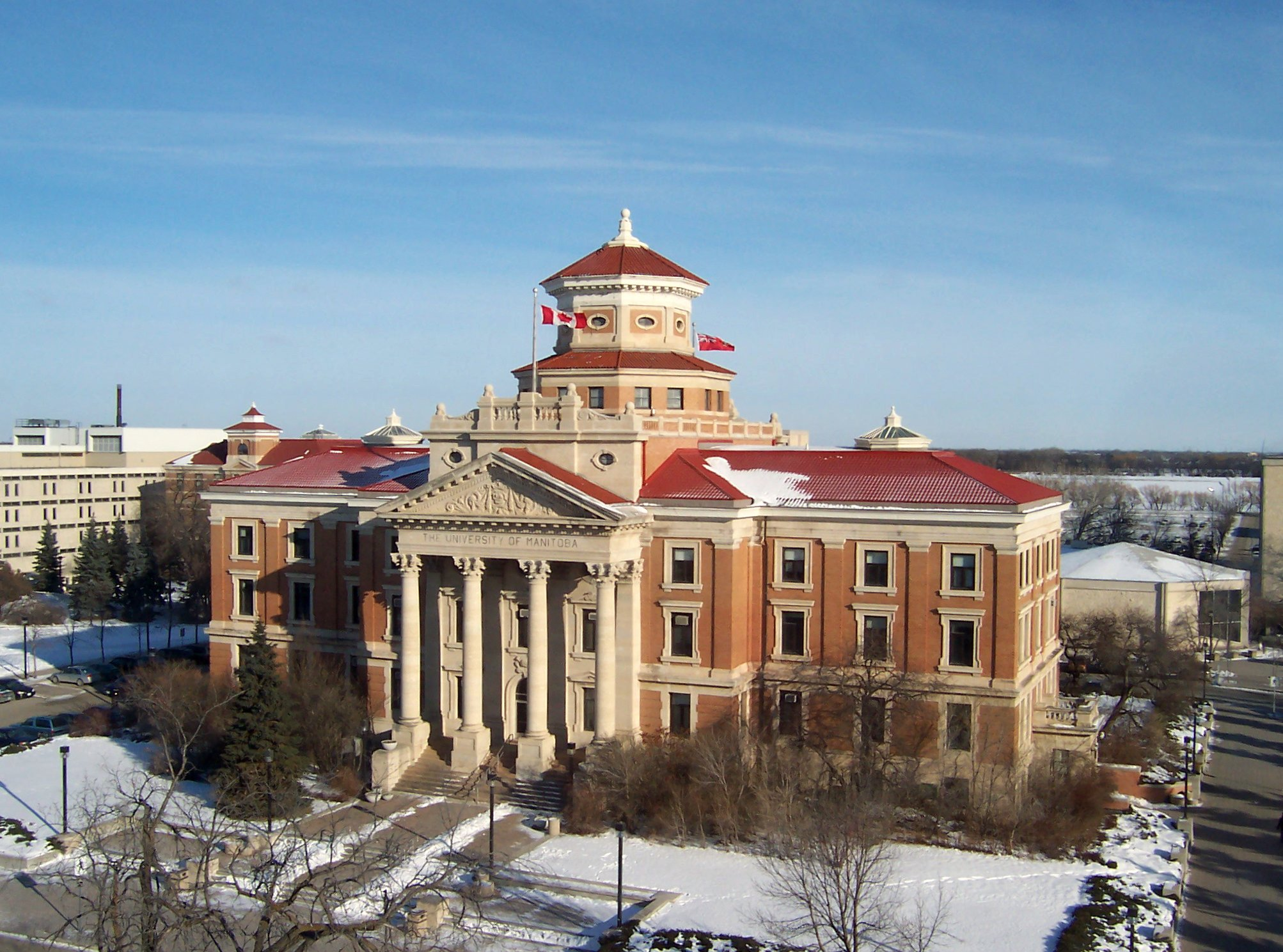
Located in Winnipeg, the University of Manitoba is the largest post-secondary institution in the province.

Winnipeg has seven school divisions: Winnipeg School Division, St. James-Assiniboia School Division, Pembina Trails School Division, Seven Oaks School Division, Division Scolaire Franco-Manitobaine, River East Transcona School Division, and Louis Riel School Division. Winnipeg also has several religious and secular private schools.

The University of Manitoba is the largest university in Manitoba. It was founded in 1877, making it Western Canada's first university. Université de Saint-Boniface is the city's French-language university. The University of Winnipeg received its charter in 1967. The Canadian Mennonite University is a private Mennonite undergraduate university established in 1999.

Winnipeg also has two independent colleges: Red River College Polytechnic and Booth University College. Red River College offers diploma, certificate, and apprenticeship programs and, starting in 2009, began offering some degree programs. Booth University College is a private Christian Salvation Army university college established in 1982. It offers mostly arts and seminary training.

== Infrastructure ==
=== Transportation ===
Winnipeg has had public transit since 1882, starting with horse-drawn streetcars. They were replaced by electric trolley cars. The trolley cars ran from 1892 to 1955, supplemented by motor buses after 1918, and electric trolleybuses from 1938 to 1970. Winnipeg Transit now runs diesel buses on its routes. In August 2025, Winnipeg Transit announced that a 60-foot zero-emission bus (ZEB) would go into service. Winnipeg became the first Canadian city with 60-foot battery-electric buses in its fleet.

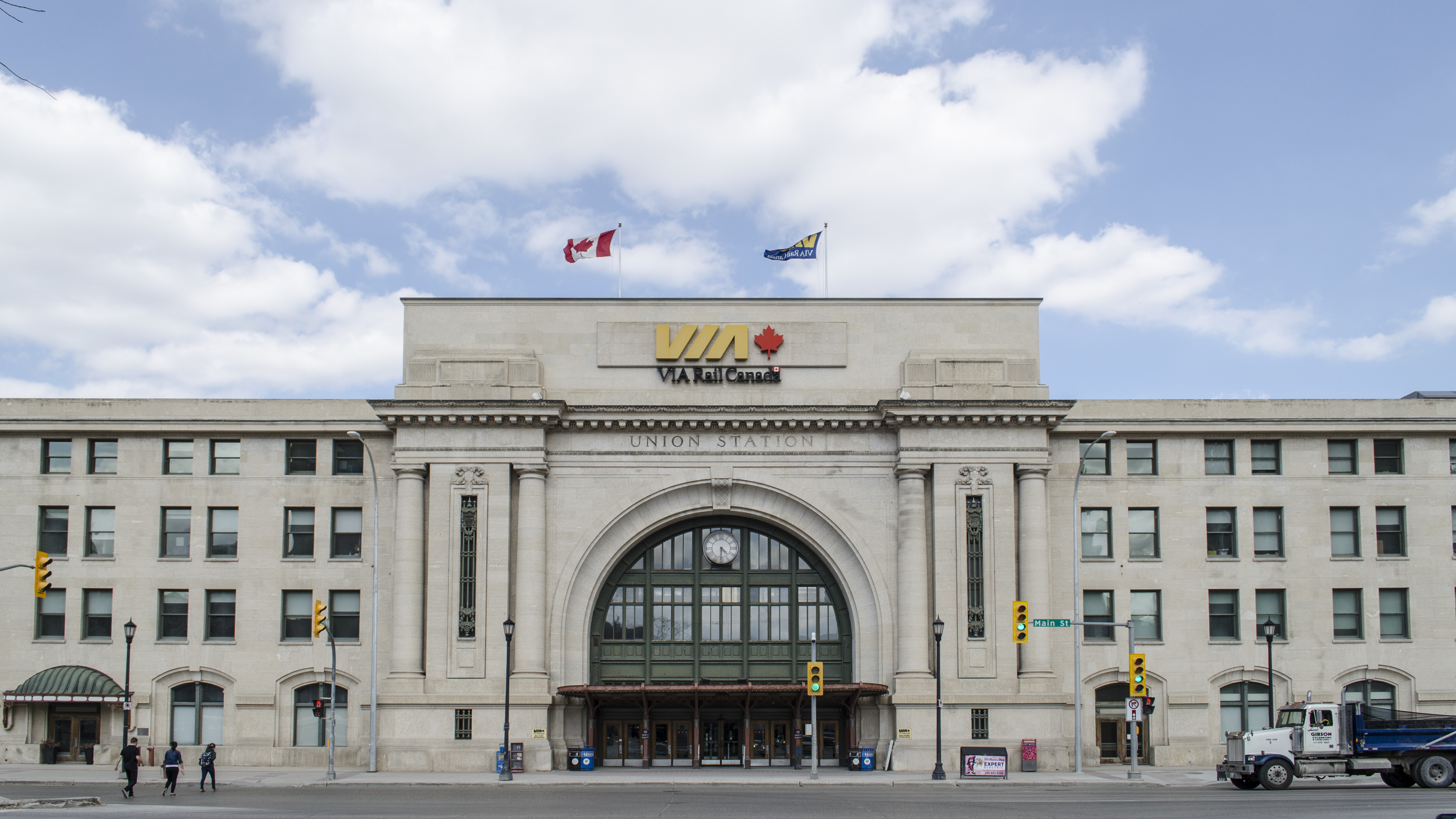
Union Station is the inter-city railway station for the city.

Winnipeg is a railway hub and is served by Via Rail at Union Station for passenger rail, and Canadian National Railway, Canadian Pacific Railway, Burlington Northern Santa Fe Manitoba, and the Central Manitoba Railway for freight rail. It is the only major city between Vancouver and Thunder Bay with direct US connections by rail (freight).

Winnipeg is the largest and best-connected city in Manitoba and has highways leading in all directions from the city. To the south, Winnipeg is connected to the United States via Provincial Trunk Highway 75 (PTH 75) (a continuation of I-29 and US 75, known as Pembina Highway or Route 42 within Winnipeg). The highway runs 107 kilometres (66 mi) to Emerson, Manitoba, and is the busiest Canada–United States border crossing on the Prairies. The four-lane Perimeter Highway, built in 1969, serves as a Ring Road, with at-grade intersections and a few interchanges. It allows travellers on the Trans-Canada Highway to bypass the city. The Trans-Canada Highway runs east to west through the city (city route), or circles around the city on the Perimeter Highway (beltway). Some of the city's major arterial roads include Route 80 (Waverley St.), Route 155 (McGillivray Blvd), Route 165 (Bishop Grandin Blvd.), Route 17 (Chief Peguis Trail), and Route 90 (Brookside Blvd., Oak Point Hwy., King Edward St., Century St., Kenaston Blvd.).

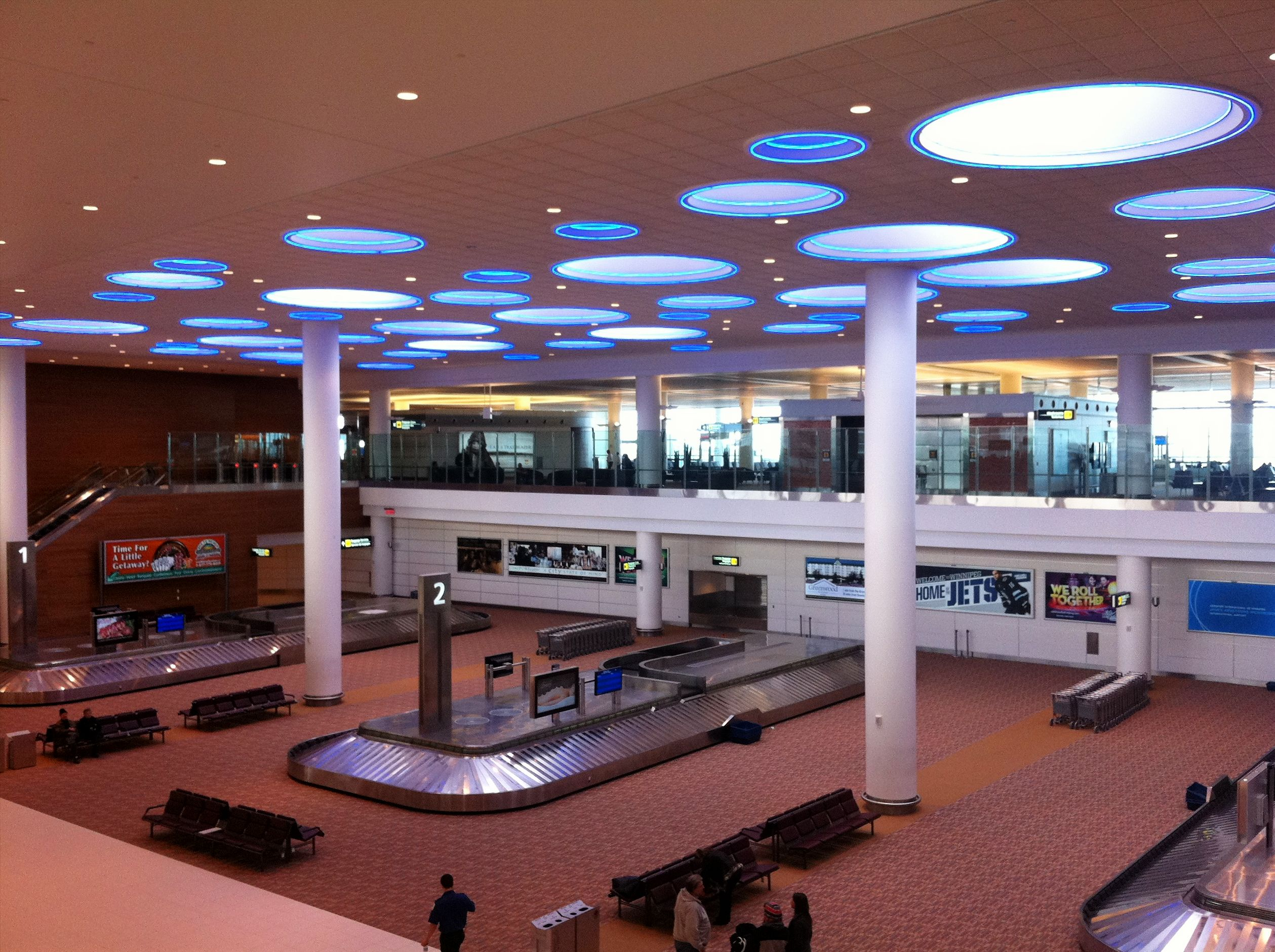
Winnipeg James Armstrong Richardson International Airport is the only commercial international airport in the province.

The Winnipeg James Armstrong Richardson International Airport completed a $585 million redevelopment in October 2011. The development brought a new terminal, a four-level parking facility, and other infrastructure improvements. Winnipeg Bus Terminal, at Winnipeg International Airport, was previously served by Greyhound Canada.

Approximately 8,100 hectares (20,000 acres) of land to the north and west of the airport has been designated as an inland port, CentrePort Canada, and is Canada's first Foreign Trade Zone. It is a private sector initiative to develop the infrastructure for Manitoba's trucking, air, rail and sea industries. In 2009, construction began on a $212 million four-lane freeway to connect CentrePort with the Perimeter Highway. Named CentrePort Canada Way, it opened in November 2013.

Several taxi companies serve Winnipeg, the largest being Unicity, Duffy's Taxi and Spring Taxi. Ride-sharing was legalized in March 2018 to where services including Uber now operate in Winnipeg. Cycling is popular in Winnipeg, and there are many bicycle trails and lanes around the city. Winnipeg holds an annual Bike-to-Work Day and Cyclovia, and bicycle commuters may be seen year-round. Active living infrastructure in Winnipeg includes bike lanes and sharrows.

=== Medical centres and hospitals ===
Winnipeg has multiple major hospitals: Health Sciences Centre (including HSC Winnipeg Children's Hospital), Concordia Hospital, Deer Lodge Centre, Grace Hospital, St. Boniface Hospital, Seven Oaks General Hospital, and Victoria General Hospital.

The National Microbiology Laboratory in Winnipeg is one of only a handful of biosafety level 4 microbiology laboratories in the world. The NML houses laboratories of the Public Health Agency of Canada (PHAC) and the Canadian Food Inspection Agency, in the National Centre for Foreign Animal Disease collocated in the same facility. Research facilities are also operated through hospitals and private biotechnology companies in the city.

=== Utilities ===
Water and sewage services are provided by the city. The city draws its water via an aqueduct from Shoal Lake, treating and fluoridating it at the Deacon Reservoir just outside the city prior to pumping it into the Winnipeg system. The city's system has over 2,500 kilometres (1,600 mi) of underground water mains, which are subject to breakage due to corrosion and pressure from extreme dry, wet, or cold soil conditions.

Electricity and natural gas are provided by Manitoba Hydro, a provincial crown corporation headquartered in the city; it uses primarily hydroelectric power. The primary telecommunications carrier is Bell MTS, although other corporations offer telephone, cellular, television and internet services.

Winnipeg contracts out several services to private companies, including garbage and recycling collection, street plowing and snow removal. This practice represents a significant budget expenditure. The services have faced numerous complaints from residents about missed service.

== Military ==
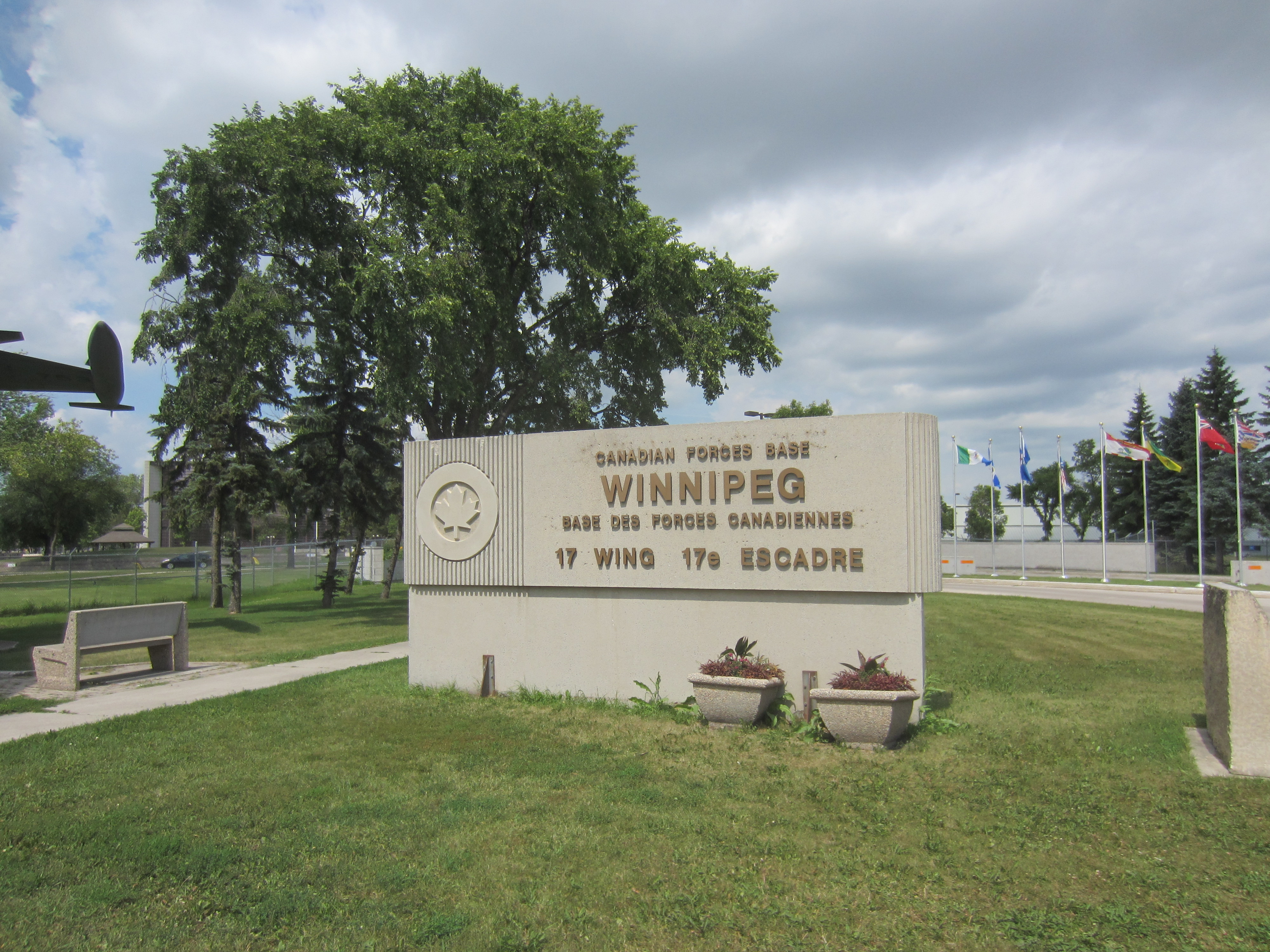
Entrance to CFB Winnipeg. CFB Winnipeg is the home garrison for a number of Royal Canadian Air Force units.

Canadian Forces Base Winnipeg, co-located at the airport, is home to many flight operations support divisions and several training schools. It is also the headquarters of 1 Canadian Air Division and the Canadian North American Aerospace Defense Command (NORAD) Region, as well as the home base of 17 Wing of the Canadian Forces. It supports 113 units, stretching from Thunder Bay to the Saskatchewan–Alberta border, and from the 49th parallel to the high Arctic, as well as the Central Flying School. 17 Wing also acts as a deployed operating base for CF-18 Hornet fighter-bombers assigned to the Canadian NORAD Region.

There are two squadrons based in the city. The 402 "City of Winnipeg" Squadron flies the Canadian-designed and produced de Havilland CT-142 Dash 8 navigation trainer. The 435 "Chinthe" Transport and Rescue Squadron flies the Lockheed CC-130 Hercules in airlift search and rescue roles. In addition, 435 Squadron is the only Royal Canadian Air Force squadron equipped and trained to conduct tactical air-to-air refuelling of fighter aircraft.

There are several units of the Canadian Army Primary Reserve based in Winnipeg. These include The Royal Winnipeg Rifles, The Queen's Own Cameron Highlanders of Canada, 38 Service Battalion, 38 Combat Engineer Regiment, 38 Signal Regiment, and The Fort Garry Horse. HMCS Chippawa is a Royal Canadian Navy reserve division in Winnipeg.

For many years, Winnipeg was the home of the Second Battalion of Princess Patricia's Canadian Light Infantry. Initially, the battalion was based at the Fort Osborne Barracks, now the location of the Rady Jewish Community Centre. They eventually moved to the Kapyong Barracks between River Heights and Tuxedo. Since 2004, the battalion has operated out of CFB Shilo near Brandon.

== Sister cities ==
Winnipeg has eleven sister cities:

- Beersheba, Israel
- Chengdu, China
- Jinju, South Korea
- Kuopio, Finland
- Lviv, Ukraine
- Manila, Philippines
- Minneapolis, United States
- Reykjavík, Iceland
- San Nicolás de los Garza, Mexico
- Setagaya (Tokyo), Japan
- Taichung, Taiwan

== See also ==
- List of people from Winnipeg
- Municipal waste management in Winnipeg
