= Manitoba Children's Museum =

Coordinates: 49.887609°N 97.12847°W

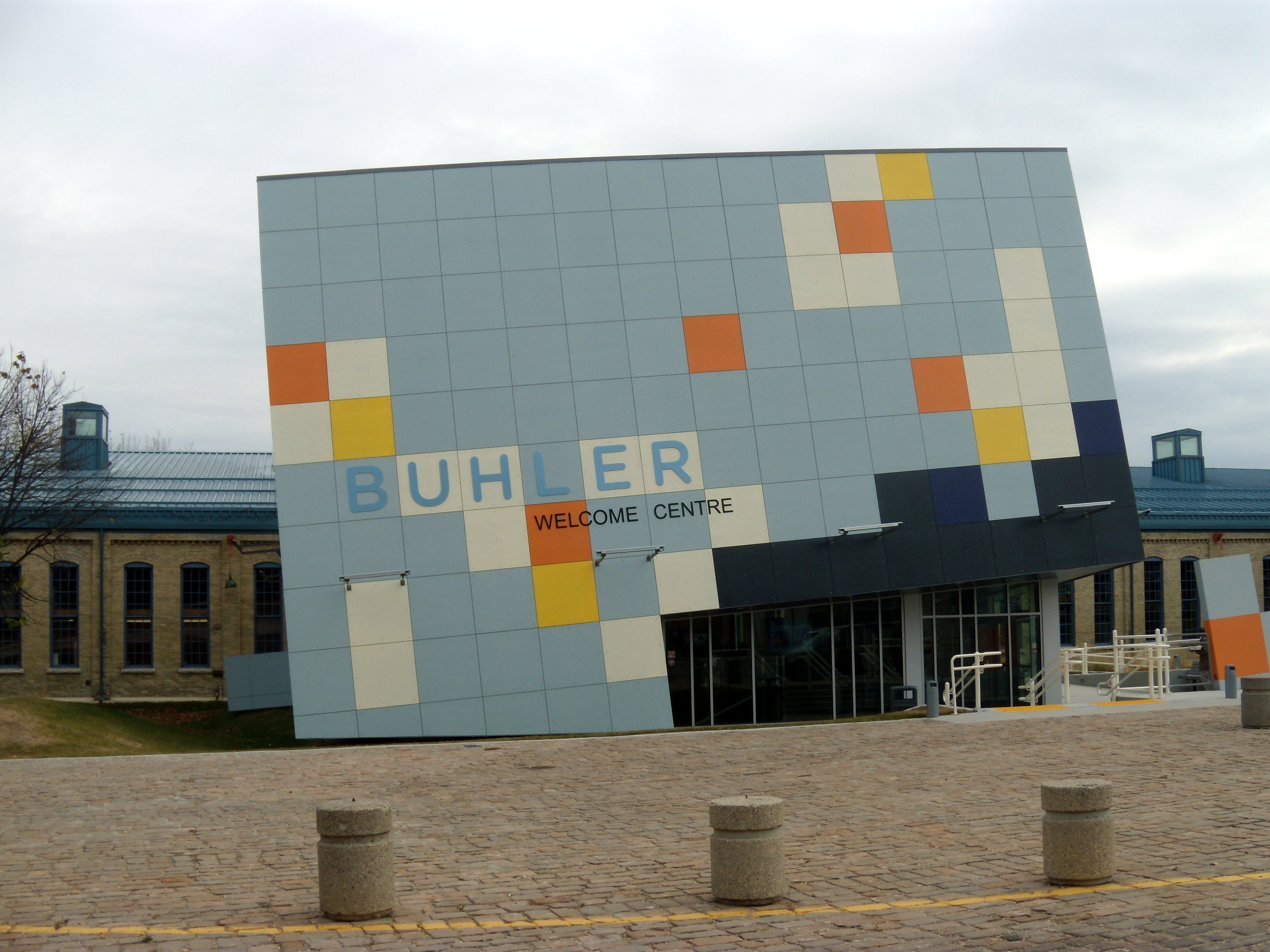
- Buhler Welcome Centre of Manitoba Children's Museum
- Established: 1986
- Location: 45 Forks Market Road; Winnipeg, Manitoba; R3C 4T6
- Type: Children's museum
- Visitors: 135,000+ annually
- Website: www.childrensmuseum.com

The Manitoba Children's Museum is a non-profit, charitable children's museum located at The Forks in Winnipeg, Manitoba, Canada.

== History ==
The museum was founded in 1983. It opened its first exhibit in a 4,000 square feet (370 m^{2}) warehouse on 21 June 1986. The museum boasted three permanent galleries: the Grain Elevator and Train, Making Sense and The Big Top, and drew 65,000 visitors the first year. The museum expanded at the location in 1988, doubling its space.

In 1989 plans were initiated to move the museum to a new space. In 1994, after a $4 million capital campaign, the museum moved to its permanent home at the former Kinsmen Building (also known as the Northern Pacific and Manitoba Railway Repair Shop or the CNR Bridges and Structures Building) in The Forks. The building at the Forks location is the oldest surviving train repair facility in Manitoba. Constructed in 1889 by the Northern Pacific and Manitoba Railway Company, the building originally included a machine and blacksmith shop, engine house and a ten-stall roundhouse and turntable. Designed by John Woodman, it was typical example of a late nineteenth-century industrial building and was formally recognized as a Provincial Heritage Site on 22 March 1995.

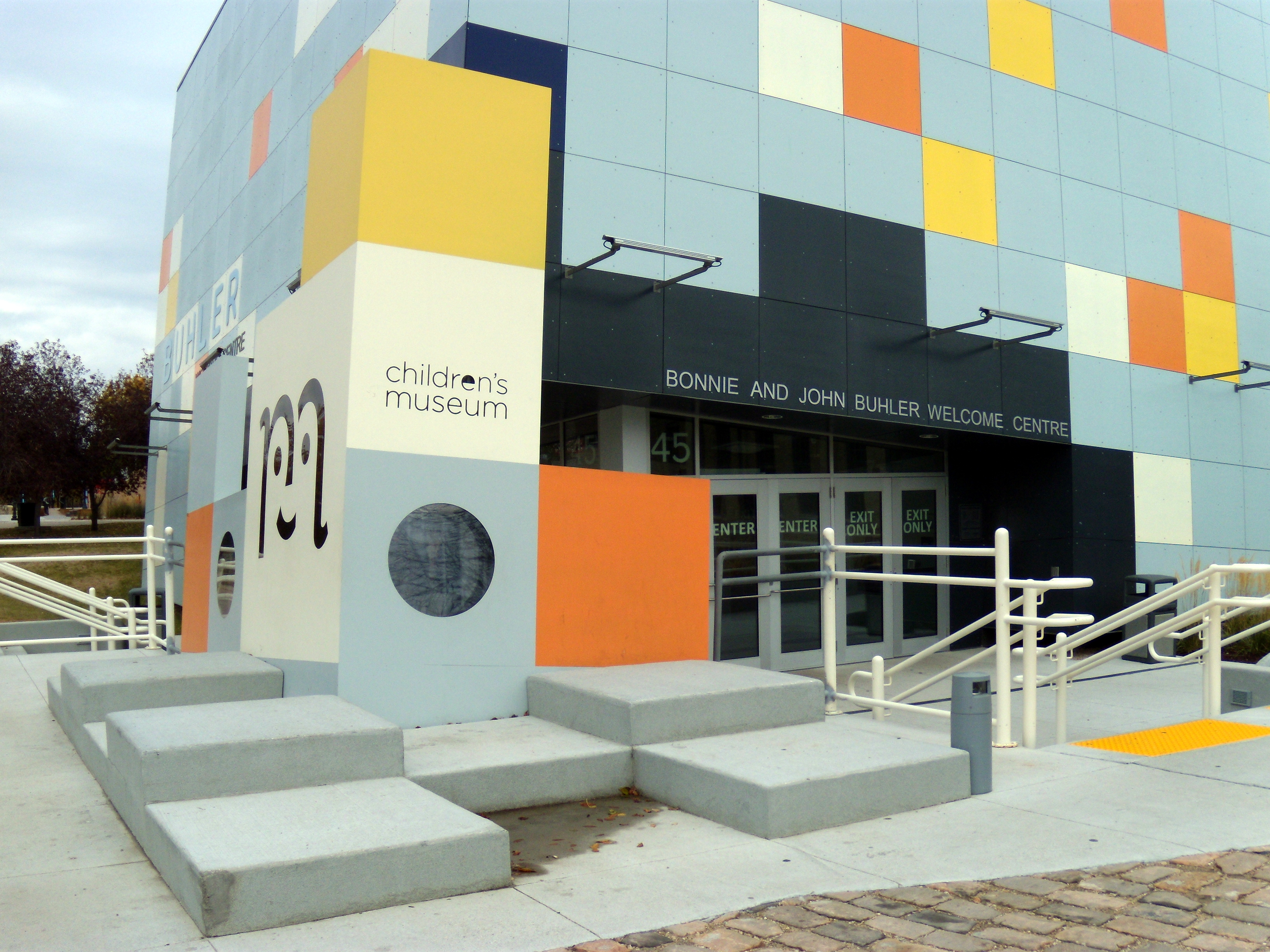
Entrance to Manitoba Children's Museum

Following a $10M capital campaign in 2010 and 2011 which included the development of 12 new permanent galleries, a renovated Arts & Exhibition Centre, and the Buhler Welcome Centre addition, the Children's Museum reopened to the public in celebration of its 25th birthday on 4 June 2011. The 12 galleries were designed as separate structures so that if one is under repair or construction, it does not affect the other galleries. The galleries were designed by Montreal's Toboggan Design. The 2011 renovation included the addition of a new 3,500 square feet (330 m^{2}) Welcome Centre, that includes a new admissions desk, museum shop and lunch room.

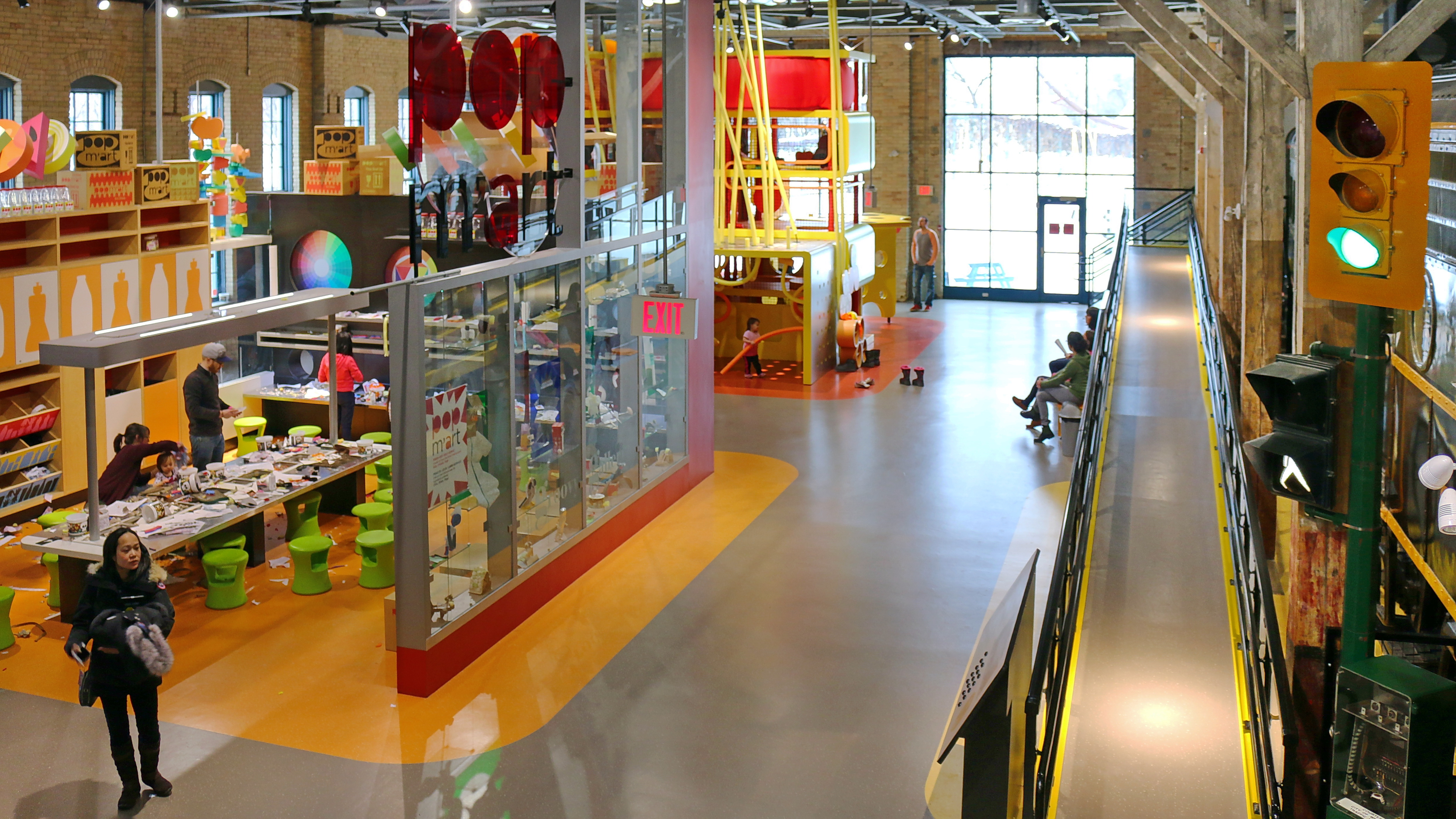
Inside the Children's Museum

The majority of the funding for the renovations came from the federal government ($2.5 million under Canadian Heritage's Canada Cultural Spaces Fund and $1.25 million under Infrastructure Canada's Infrastructure Stimulus Fund), the provincial government ($1.25 million) and the City of Winnipeg ($446,000). The rest of the funding came from private donors, including philanthropists John and Bonnie Buhler ($800,000), as well as other fundraising activities.

== Today ==
The Children's Museum features twelve permanent galleries. Visitors can hop aboard the authentic 1952 diesel locomotive and 1910 Pullman passenger coach, explore the five-storey tall Lasagna Lookout, test their perceptions in the giant Illusion Tunnel, perform water experiments in Splash Lab, and much more. A toddler exclusive space, Tot Spot serves the needs of the museum's smallest visitors.

The museum provides public services, programs, workshops and special events - including memberships, spring and summer day camps, birthday parties, museum rentals, and more.

18% of the museum's operating budget comes from supporting levels of the government. Earned revenue (including admission and membership fees, shop sales, birthdays, and museum rentals) and fundraising initiatives cover the remaining 82% of operating costs.

=== Galleries ===
Current museum galleries include:

- Time Squared
- Tot Spot
- Tumble Zone
- Mellow Marsh
- Illusion Tunnel
- Junction 9161
- Engine House
- Story Line
- Milk Machine
- Splash Lab
- Pop m'Art
- Lasagna Lookout

The museum is also home to the historic Eaton's fairytale vignette display, Eaton's "Santa's Village", which is open seasonally from mid-November to early January for the holidays. The display has been fully restored and relocated from the ninth floor annex of the Eaton's downtown store. The display includes fifteen vignettes including classics such as Cinderella, Humpty Dumpty, and Three Blind Mice.

Previous galleries include:

- The Tree & Me
- WonderWorks
- OurTV
- LiveWire
- The Sun

The Children's museum hosts a different travelling seasonal gallery every summer. These galleries have been:

- Tapescape
- Castle builders
- Run jump fly

Affiliations:

The museum is affiliated with the Canadian Museums Association (CMA), the Canadian Association of Science Centres (CASC), the Association of Children's Museums (ACM), the Canadian Heritage Information Network (CHIN), and the Virtual Museum of Canada.

== Awards and recognition ==
- Listed as a "Manitoba Star Attraction" by Travel Manitoba.
- Received Rand McNally's "Best of the Road" Attraction in the 2010 Road Atlas.
- Voted "Best Place for a Children's Party", "Best Place to Take Your Child on a Crummy Day", and "Best Indoor Play-Place" by readers of Winnipeg Parent Newsmagazine in 2011.
- "Shop", the museum's gift store, has routinely received an excellent grade from Project Peacemakers for their "Violence is Not Child's Play" annual toy inspections.
- Recognized as an International Reading Association "Celebrate Literacy Award" Winner by the Reading Council of Greater Winnipeg in 2011.
- Recognized as Where Magazine's "Best New or Improved Attraction" Winner in 2011.
