= The Forks, Winnipeg =

Historic meeting place in Winnipeg, Manitoba, Canada

The Forks
- ᓂᐢᑕᐚᔮᐤ (nistawâyâw) (Cree)
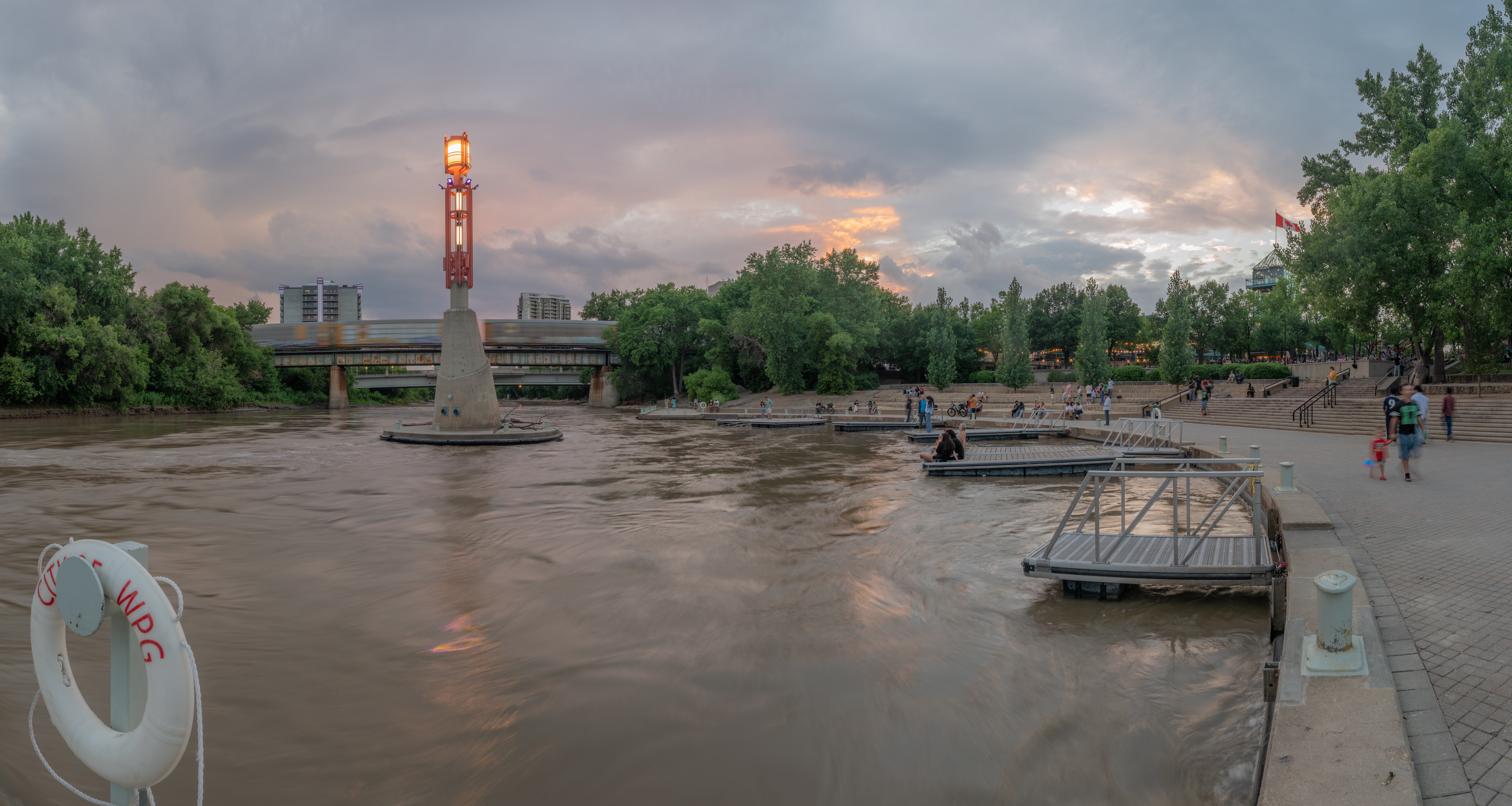
- The docks at The Forks, with the Assiniboine River near its confluence with the Red River
- Interactive map of The Forks
- 49°53′13″N 97°07′50″W
- Type: Historic site
- Location: Winnipeg, Manitoba, Canada

History
- Founded: c. 4000 BCE

Site notes
- Governing body: The Forks North Portage Partnership
- Visitors: 4,000,000+ annually
- Website: www.theforks.com

National Historic Site of Canada
- Official name: The Forks National Historic Site of Canada
- Designated: 1974
- Public transit: Winnipeg Transit; D12 D13 31

Crowd under the canopy in the Forks Market Plaza

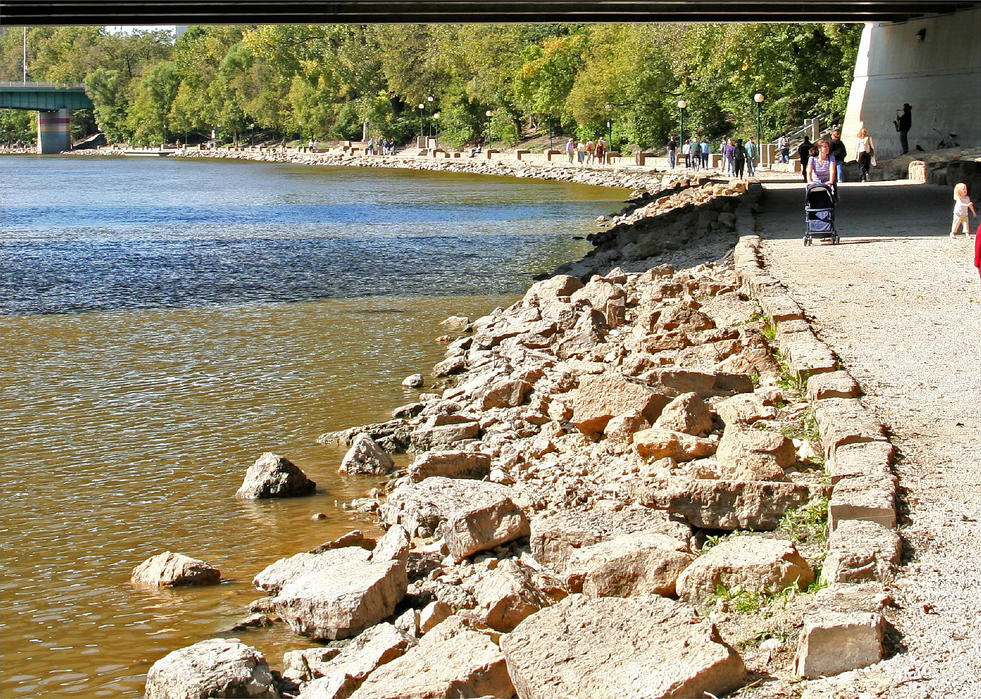
Assiniboine Riverwalk

The Forks (French: La Fourche; Cree: ᓂᐢᑕᐚᔮᐤ, nistawâyâw, often rendered as "Nestawaya") is a historic site, meeting place, and green space in downtown Winnipeg located at the confluence of the Red River and the Assiniboine River.

The Forks was designated a National Historic Site of Canada in 1974 due to its status as a cultural landscape that had borne witness to six thousand years of human activity. The site's 5.5-hectare (14-acre) grounds are open year-round.

== Name ==
The first attestation of the French form of the name known to Elliott Coues was in the writing of the Vérendrye brothers, who in 1738 wrote of "La Fourche des Assiliboiles". According to Coues, the name "the Forks" had become established in English by the end of the eighteenth century. The place-name arises from the largely North American usage of the noun fork to mean "the point at which a river divides into two, or the point of junction of two rivers; a branch or tributary". According to Geographical Names of Manitoba, "the plural form is used because two rivers [...] merge here. If a single river splits into two branches, the singular 'fork' is more properly used".

== History ==
=== Pre-colonial era ===
Numerous archaeological digs have shown that early Indigenous groups arrived at The Forks site around 6,000 years ago. The digs conducted between 1989 and 1994 discovered several Indigenous camps. Artifacts related to the bison hunt and fishing were unearthed. Evidence showed that Nakoda (Assiniboins), Cree, Anishinaabe (Ojibwa) and Sioux (Dakota) visited the site. Seasonal migration routes from northern forests to southern plains featured the Forks area as a rest stop, and the location became a key transcontinental trade link.

The Assiniboine River has followed its modern course for approximately 700 years. The Assiniboine River formerly met the Red River near the present-day mouth of the La Salle River.

=== 1734–1880 ===
European fur traders arrived at the site and initiated trade with the local peoples, using the Assiniboine people as fur trade middlemen.

Europeans arrived by canoe in 1738. La Vérendrye erected Fort Rouge, the first of a long line of forts and trading posts erected in the area. The Red River Colony and the forts were all established near The Forks. The area remained the hub of the fur trade up until the 1880s. At that time, grain production became Western Canada's principal industry and the main transportation for that industry was rail rather than waterways.

From 1760 to 1821, the Hudson's Bay Company (HBC) and North West Company competed for furs. Both companies used The Forks to store and ship supplies and furs. By 1821, competing fur companies were amalgamated into the HBC.

=== 1886–1923 ===
The rail yards of the Northern Pacific and Manitoba Railway Company, the Canadian Northern, the Grand Trunk Pacific Railroad, and the Canadian National Railway were dominant facets of the Forks site, and this era is responsible for some of the buildings still standing at The Forks.

The Forks Market was formed by joining the Grand Trunk Pacific Railway stable and the Great Northern Railway stable. What is now the Johnston Terminal was originally known as the National Cartage Building.

The Manitoba Children's Museum is housed in what used to be the Northern Pacific and Manitoba Railway Company's Buildings and Bridges (B & B) Buildings. Union Station is still in operation.

Across the Prairies, the Canadian government began actively promoting immigration, settlement, and railway development in the late 1800s. The Canadian government erected two immigration sheds at The Forks, each accommodating up to 500 people.

=== The Forks today ===
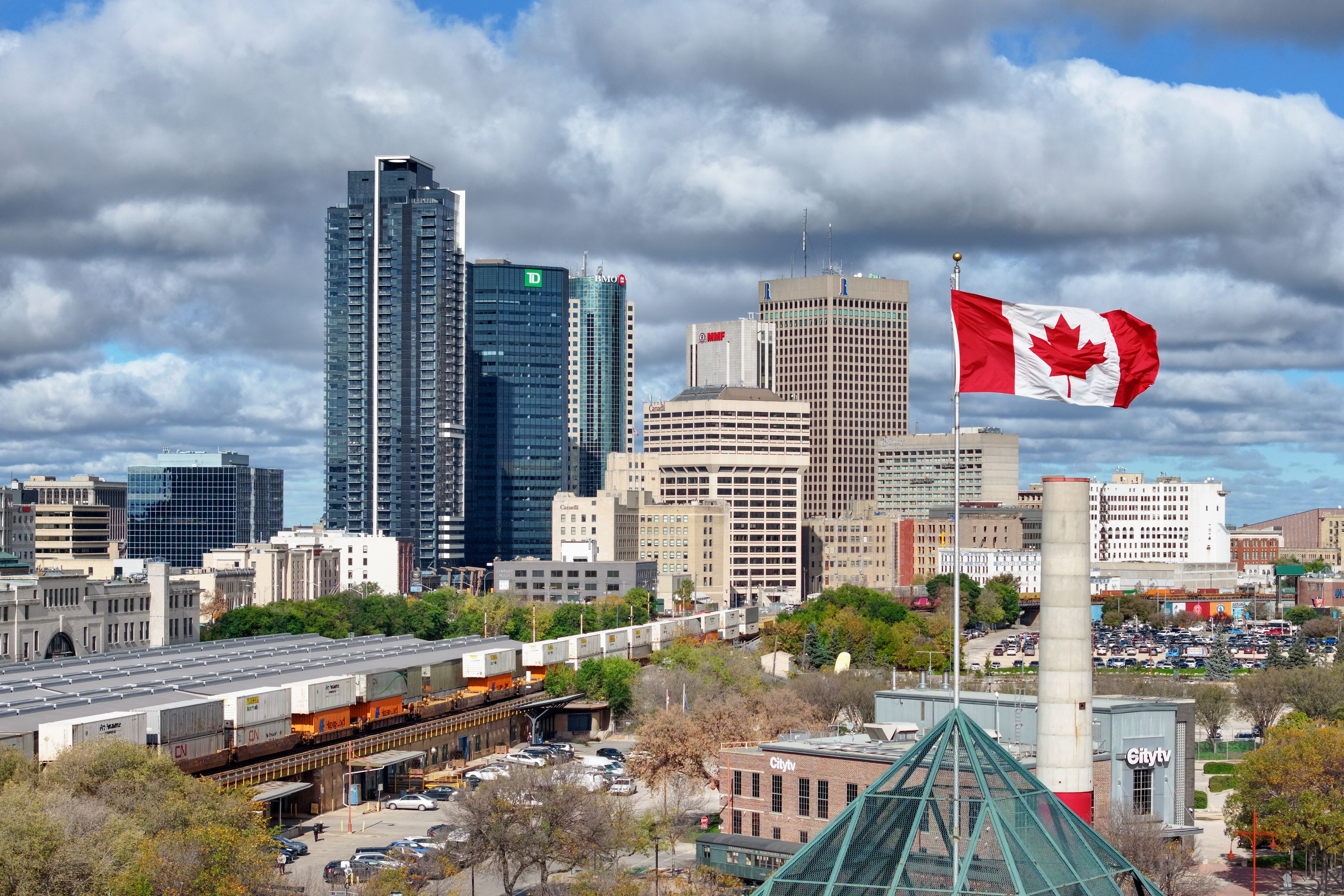
View of Downtown Winnipeg from The Forks

On July 24, 1987, the Forks Renewal Corporation (FRC) was incorporated as a wholly owned subsidiary of the North Portage Development Corporation (NPDC). The objective of FRC was to provide a mechanism for implementing the redevelopment of the former CN East Yards area. The result was The Forks as its known today. (The operations of FRC and NPDC were merged in 1994 to form The Forks North Portage Partnership.)

Following the opening of the Forks National Historic Site in 1989, the Forks became the location of an interpretive park, and later public space for celebrations and recreation, revitalized historic and new buildings containing shops and restaurants, as well as a skateboard park and historic port. The Forks attracts over four million visitors each year.

== Facilities ==
=== The Forks Market ===
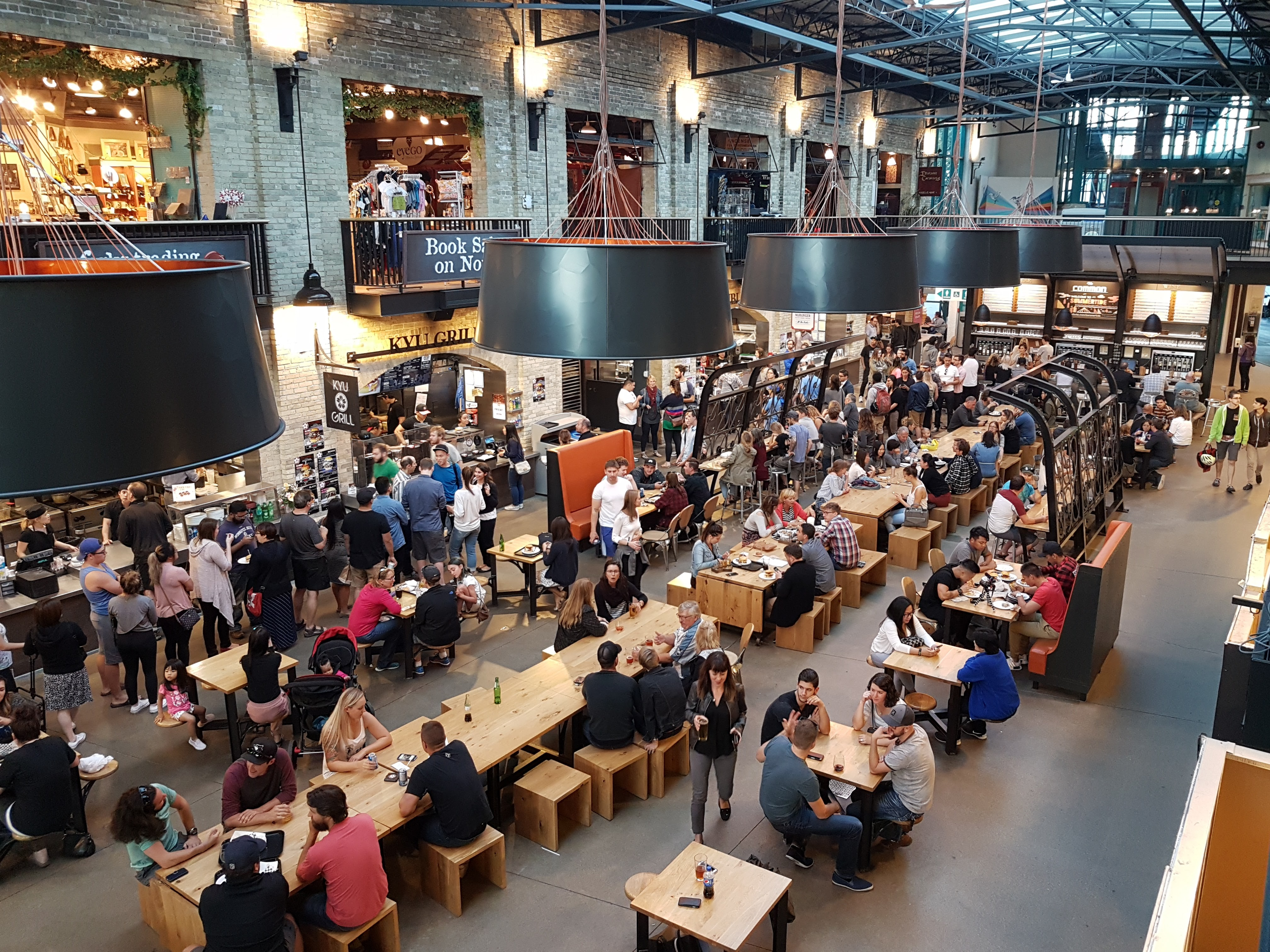
The food hall at the Forks in downtown Winnipeg, Manitoba. Photo is taken from the second level, looking down on crowded tables of people eating and drinking.

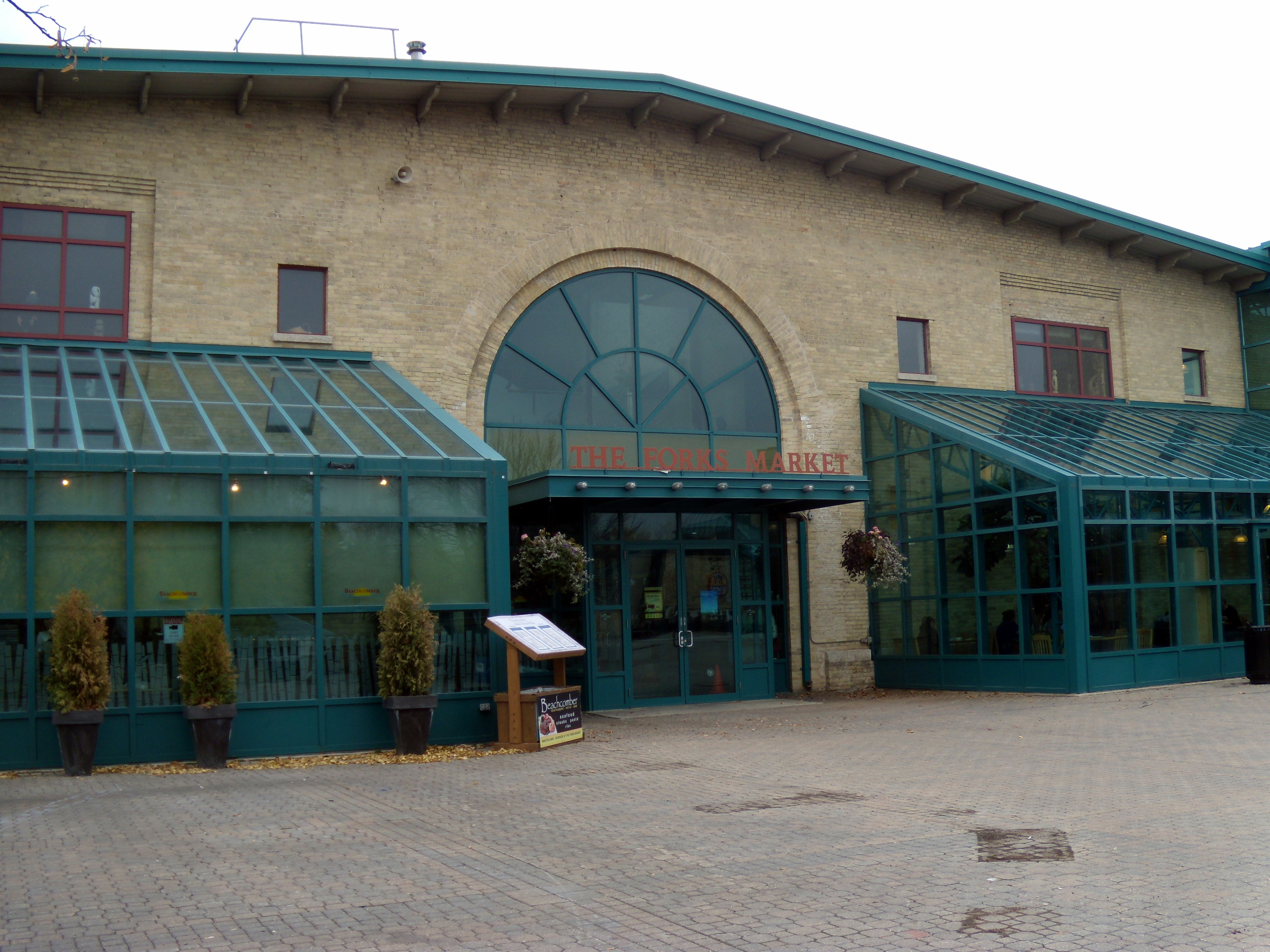
Entrance to The Forks Market

Beginning as two adjacent stables for competing rail companies (Grand Trunk Pacific and Great Northern), the horse stalls were joined by a courtyard and bridges, and became what is now known as The Forks Market.

The Forks Market features a six-storey tower with viewing platform, which is accessible by stairs or elevator and features interpretive panels with information on the site's history.

The market also comprises two storeys of vendors selling everything from fresh fruit, bread, meat, and wine to cigars and aromatherapy products to crafts and artworks from 300 local and Canadian artisans.

In mid-2016, the Forks completed a $2.5-million renovation of the food hall into a feature called The Common, including a new beer and wine kiosk.

Outside, located directly in between The Forks Market and Johnston Terminal, The Forks Market Plaza features fountains, canopies, dancing programs, several open performance spaces and patios. In the winter, the Plaza is home to an artificially cooled skating rink, under a canopy and lights.

=== Johnston Terminal ===
Johnston Terminal
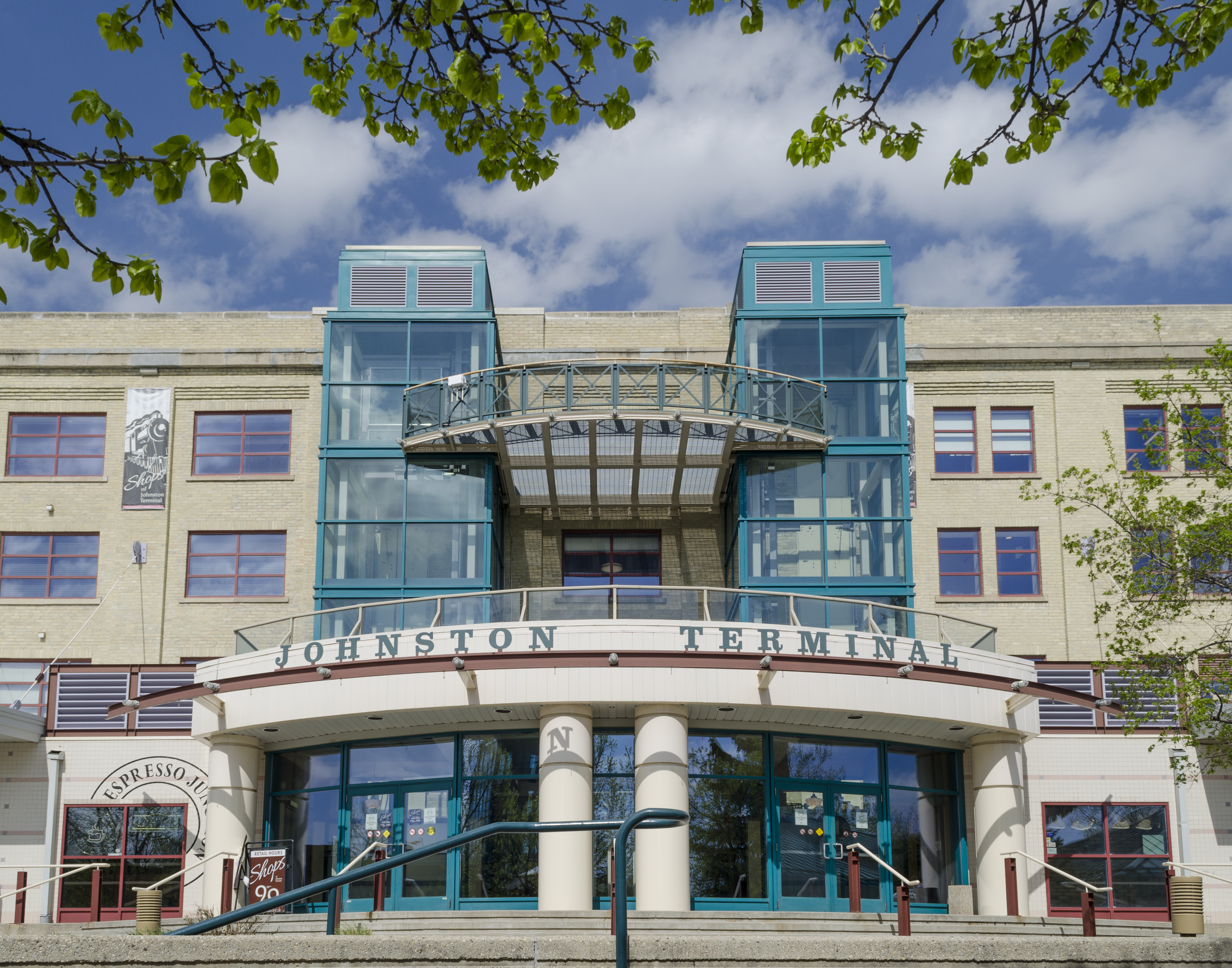
- The main entrance to Johnston Terminal at the Forks
- Former names: National Cartage Building

General information
- Location: 25 Forks Market Rd, Winnipeg, MB
- Completed: 1928
- Cost: $134,700
- Owner: Artis REIT

Technical details
- Floor count: 4

Design and construction
- Main contractor: Carter-Halls-Aldinger Company

Across the courtyard from the Forks Market is the four-storey Johnston Terminal building.

It was constructed in 1928 by Carter-Halls-Aldinger Company, and cost an estimated $134,700. Originally named the National Cartage Building, it was built as a warehouse and freight-forwarding facility for the Canadian National Railway (CNR).

After a substantial addition in 1930, the warehouse was at the time one of the largest in Winnipeg, containing over 9,300 square metres (100,000 sq ft) of usable space. It was occupied by National Storage and Cartage, a wholly owned CNR subsidiary, until 1961, and was leased to the Johnston National Cartage Company (later known as the Johnston Terminals Company) for the next 15 years.

Vacated in 1977, the building was unoccupied until the redevelopment of the site into The Forks as a retail space. The developers, Artis REIT, continue to own and manage Johnston Terminal.

The building is now a municipally designated historic site, and is now home to a variety of specialty boutiques, stores, offices, and restaurants. The main and second floor tenants are retailers, including The Old Spaghetti Factory; while the third and fourth floors are leased to office tenants. The basement of the building hosts the Johnston Terminal Antique Mall, which has more than 30 consigners and 7,000 square feet (650 m^{2}) of new merchandise brought in daily.

=== Travel Manitoba Visitor Information Centre ===
Travel Manitoba Visitor Information Centre is the visitor information centre for Manitoba, offering travel counselling and trip planning services. The centre also acts as a meeting point for the "6,000 Years in 60 Minutes!" Parks Canada interpretive program offered throughout the summer months.

=== Manitoba Children's Museum ===
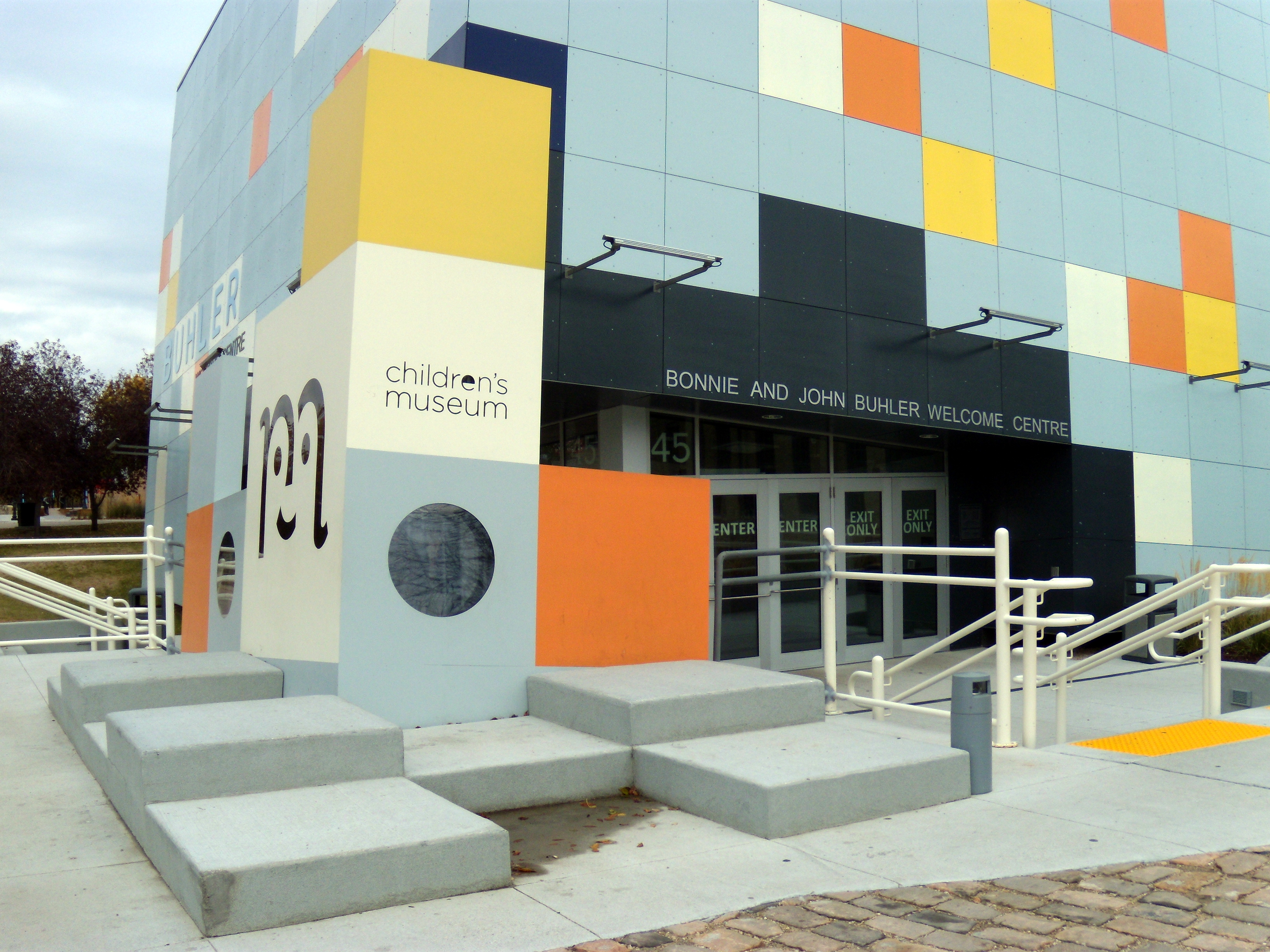
Entrance to Manitoba Children's Museum

Located next to the Oodena Celebration Circle, the Manitoba Children's Museum is a non-profit, charitable children's museum featuring twelve permanent galleries. Originally opened at a different location in 1986, the museum's moved to its current building at the Forks in 1994. The museum is now housed in the former Kinsmen Building, which is the oldest surviving train repair facility in Manitoba, having been built in 1889.

The museum underwent $10 million in renovations in 2011, including the addition of the Buhler Welcome Centre.

=== Shaw Performing Arts Center ===
The Manitoba Theatre for Young People (MTYP) is a theatre for children and young adults, located at the Canwest Performing Arts Centre (now the Shaw Performing Arts Center) in The Forks. The location provides 28,000 square feet (2,600 m^{2}) of space for the theatre to use towards its missions of producing entertaining professional theatre, providing training in theatre and portraying the experience of Canadian children.

MTYP's Theatre School offers Fall, Winter, and Spring sessions, as well as spring break and summer camps, including classes for children as young as three years old. MTYP offers free acting, performing and film training classes to Winnipeg's Indigenous youth between the ages of 12 and 18.

=== Canadian Museum for Human Rights ===
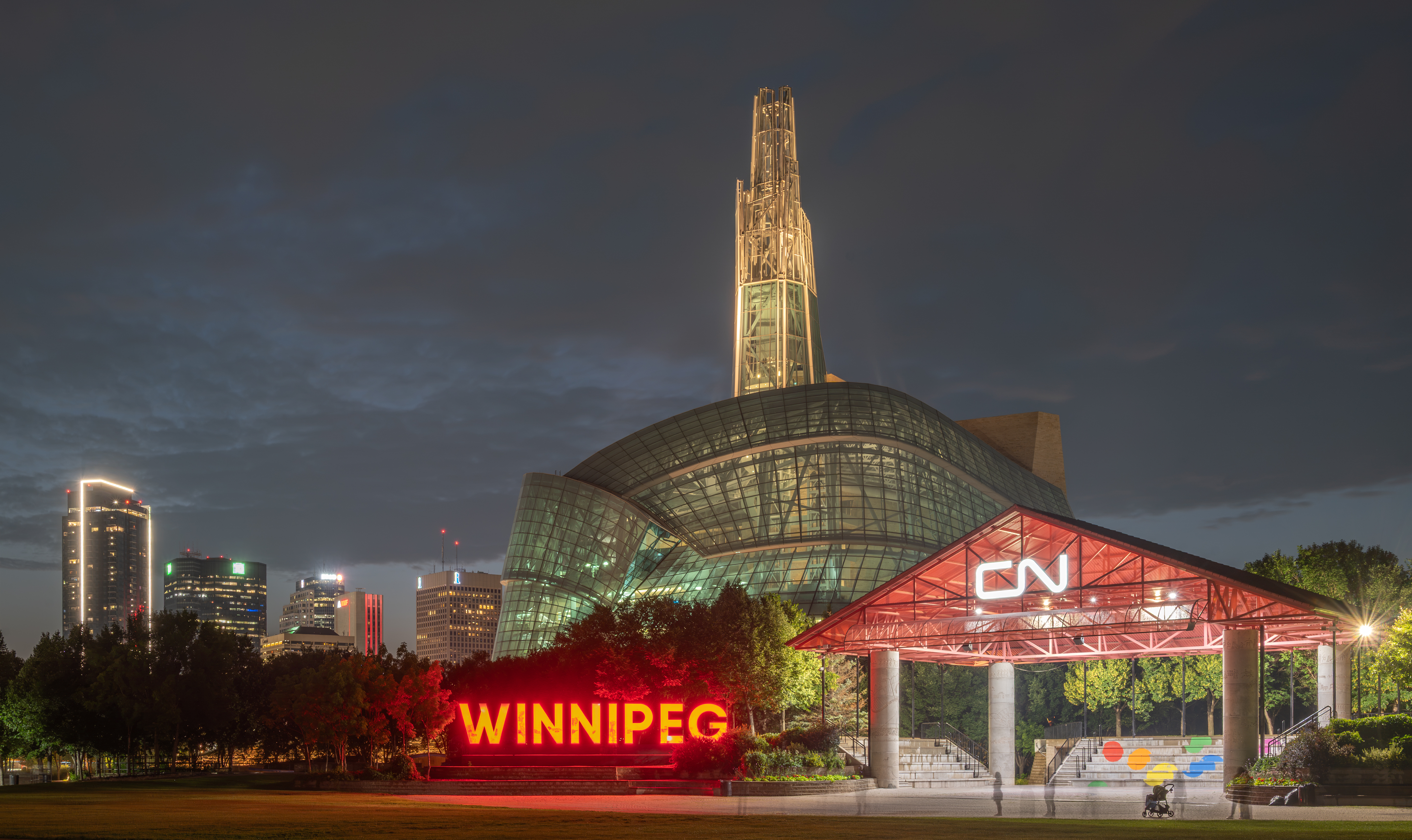
The Canadian Museum for Human Rights at night, viewed from The Forks

The Forks is the location of the Canadian Museum for Human Rights, the first national museum in Canada located outside of Ottawa. Its construction was completed in 2014.

The site for the museum is one of archaeological importance relating to First Nations history.

=== Inn at the Forks ===
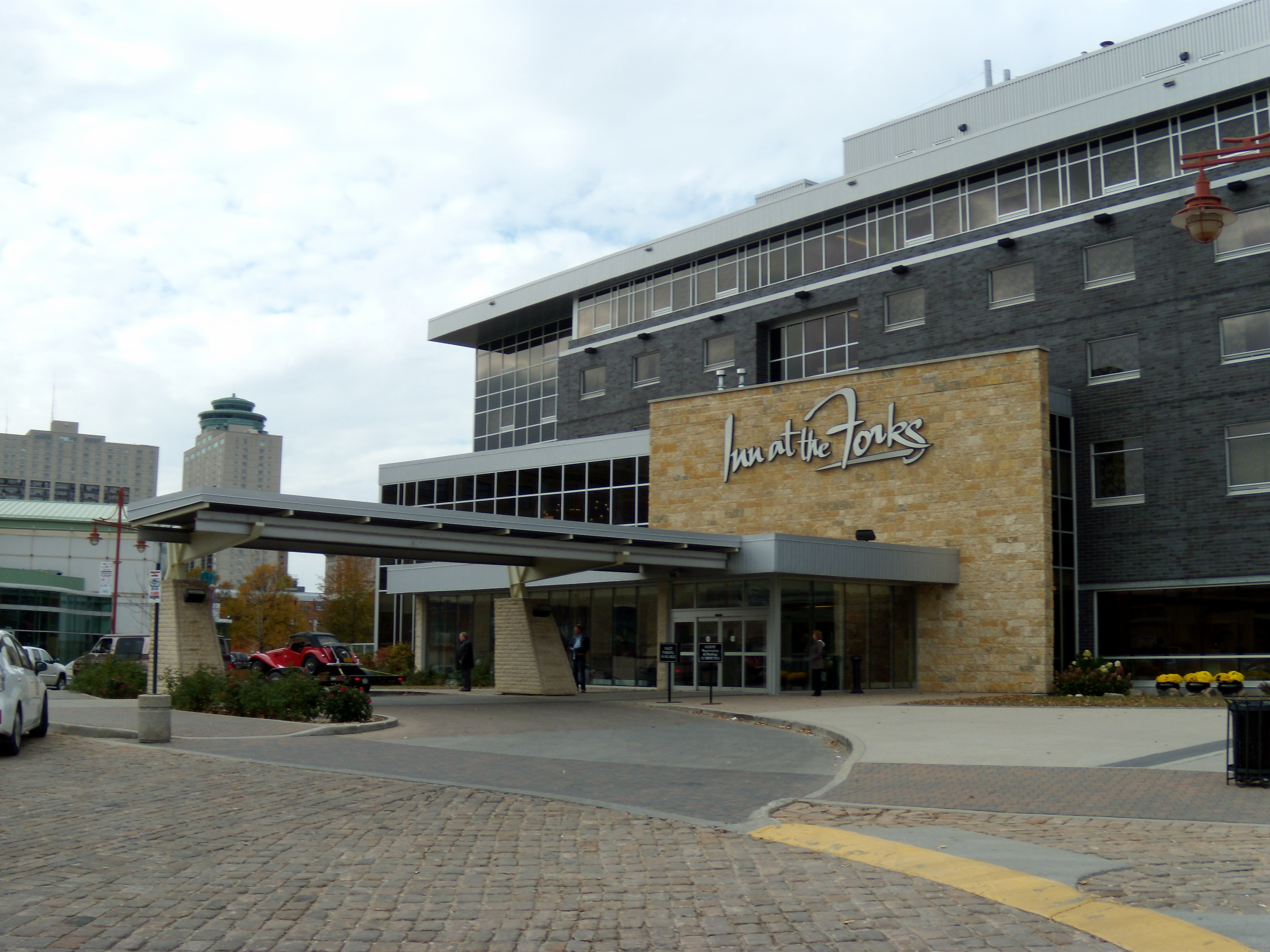
Inn at the Forks

Inn at the Forks is a five-storey hotel located at the Forks. It has 117 guest rooms and suites, meeting and reception space for up to 200 people, fitness facilities, and features the restaurant Smith and Riverstone Spa. The hotel features natural slate floors in the main lobby, glass vanities in the suite washrooms, heated floors, and a water wall in the spa.

The Inn at the Forks project was the first Canadian application of the "Redi-Maid" system that links ensuite occupancy sensors, lighting and mechanical system controls to staff PDAs with the goal of maximizing energy efficiency. The hotel was completed with a construction cost of $16 million in May 2004.

=== Winnipeg Railway Museum ===
The Winnipeg Railway Museum is located at the historic Union Station adjacent to the Forks. It is home to the Countess of Dufferin, the first steam locomotive on the Canadian Prairies or to enter western Canada. The museum closed on 31 December 2021.

== Outdoor features ==
The Forks features numerous outdoor facilities, sculptures, and landscape features open to the public.

=== Arctic Glacier Winter Park ===
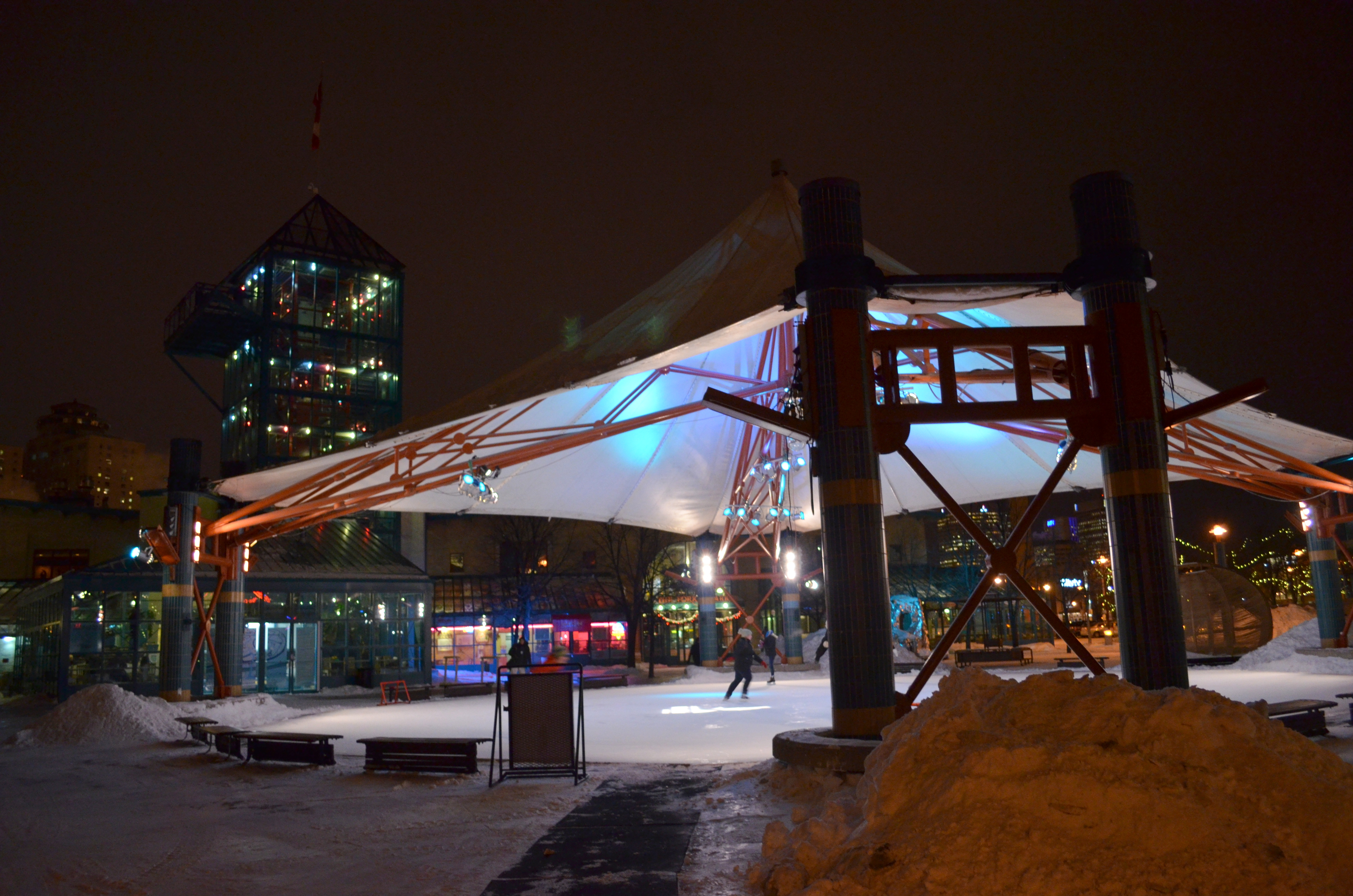
Ice skating under the canopy

During winter, the following skating rinks, trails, and snow park structures are erected at the Forks:

- The Plaza Skating Rink
- An Olympic-sized Skating Rink
- Rink under Scotiabank Stage
- 1.2 km of skating trails
- The Snowboard Fun Park
- The Toboggan Run
- The Ironman Outdoor Curling Bonspiel

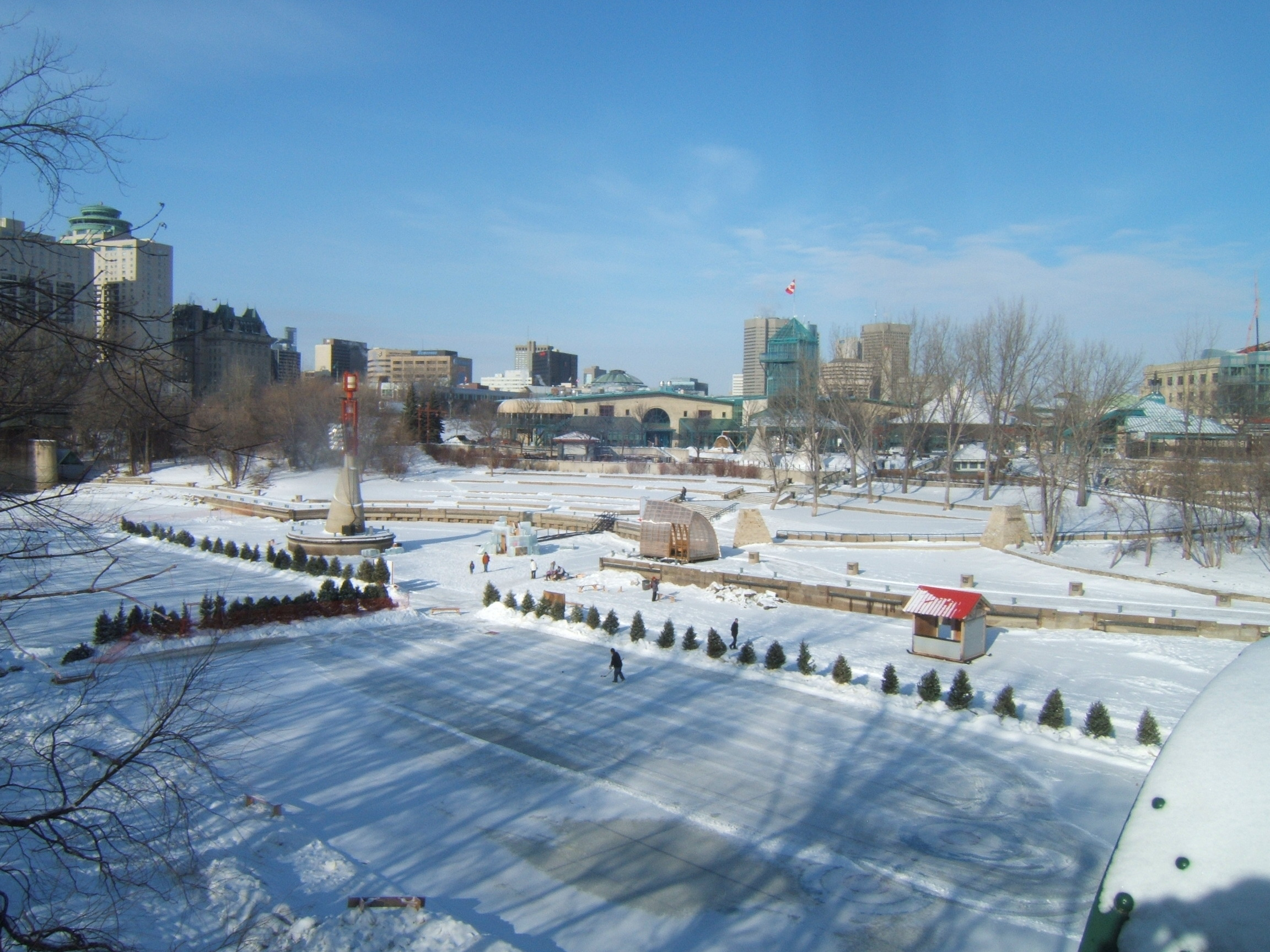
Ice skating on the river

In January 2008, the Guinness Book of World Records recognized The Forks as the home of The Nestaweya River Trail, longest skating rink in the world. The 8.54-kilometre-long River Trail on the Assiniboine River and the Red River is almost 1-kilometre longer than the previous record-holding rink. The 7.8-kilometre long rink on the Rideau Canal in Ottawa, Ontario had lost its World Record title which it had held since 1971. Then in 2008 the rivers beat their own record which made the longest rink go to about 9.3-kilometres. The Rideau Canal still held the record for the "world's largest naturally frozen ice rink" by the Guinness Book of World Records because "its entire length receives daily maintenance such as sweeping, ice thickness checks and there are toilet and recreational facilities along its entire length". In 2013, the Assiniboine Credit Union River Trail lost its record to the Lake Windermere Whiteway at Invermere, British Columbia.

The length of the skating trail at The Forks changes each year, depending on river and ice conditions, although a concerted effort is made to make it as long as possible. In the winter of 2010/2011, conditions on The Assiniboine River made it impossible to safely create skating westward, so the path extended instead south on the Red River. Essentially, the water level and the weather at the time of freeze-up will impact the way the ice forms (see frazil ice, for example), how stable it will be, and how smoothly it can be made for skating. Much of the local river ice in Winnipeg in the winter of 2010/2011 was too rough to form a skating surface. There is also a skating trail made overland which is not impacted by river conditions. There are also walking and ski trails running parallel to the skating trail.

Warming Huts: An Art + Architecture Competition on Ice is an open competition endorsed by the Manitoba Association of Architects. Started in 2010, the first iteration of the competition saw five local architects building outdoor structures to protect people from winter weather. In 2011, competition was opened up to international participants and included work by Frank Gehry's firm Gehry Partners. The competition has been awarded a Downtown Merit Award from the International Downtown Association.

Year	Opening	Closing	Days open	Maximum length (km)
2009	9 Jan	5 Mar	56	9.34
2010	4 Jan	5 Mar	61	7.5
2011	13 Jan			
2012	24 Jan	11 Mar	48	
2013	24 Dec	27 Feb	66	7
2014	10 Jan	11 Mar	61	6.5
2015	1 Jan	9 Mar	68	6.1

=== Assiniboine Riverwalk ===
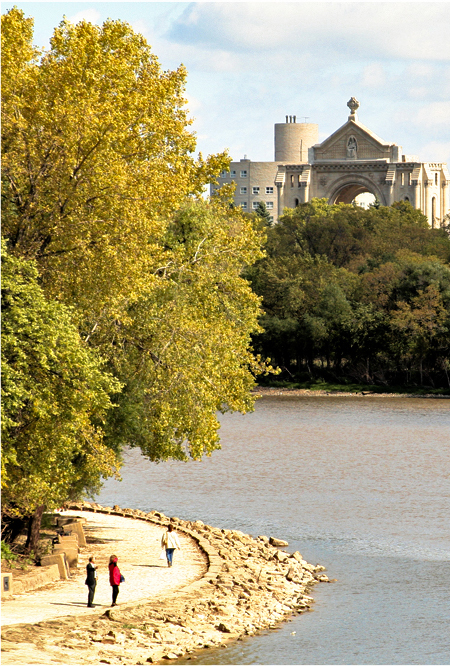
The Assiniboine Riverwalk, with the Saint Boniface Cathedral in the background

The Assiniboine Riverwalk follows along the Assiniboine riverbanks from underneath Esplanade Riel to the grounds of the Manitoba Legislative Building.

The Riverwalk is often closed due to river flooding in springtime. From the construction of the walkway to the summer of 2011, the walkway has been submerged beyond access for part of the summer for 16 out of 21 years.

Year	Days submerged	Total
2011	1 Apr – 3 Sep	156
2012	21 – 25 Mar	5
2013	27 Apr – 16 Jul	80
2014	15 Apr – 3 Oct	171
2015	23 – 27 Mar	5

=== Broadway Promenade ===
The Broadway Promenade is a pedestrian walkway connecting the Esplanade Riel pedestrian bridge to Union Station and Broadway. Designed by Scatliff+Miller+Murray, the design incorporates two pathways which cross the site. One pathway re-established the historic Broadway/Provencher Boulevard connection, and the other is a winding pathway representing pre-European contact era.

=== Esplanade Riel ===
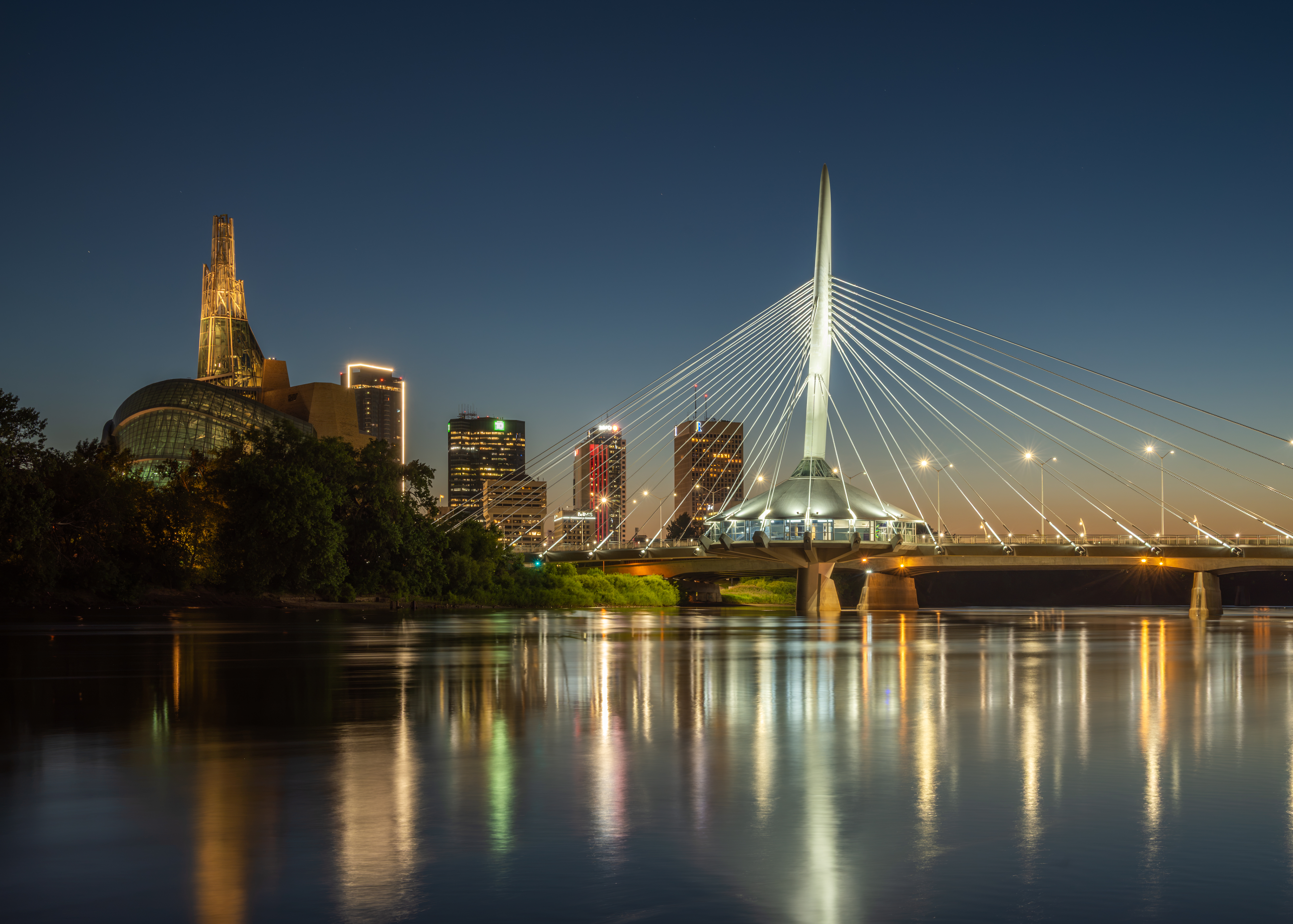
Esplanade Riel pedestrian bridge

Named in honor of Louis Riel, Esplanade Riel is a pedestrian-only side-spar cable-stayed bridge which spans the Red River connecting downtown Winnipeg with St. Boniface, and it is paired with a vehicular bridge, the Provencher Bridge.

Co-designed by architects Guy Préfontaine and Étienne Gaboury of Gaboury Préfontaine Perry Architects Inc., Esplanade Riel was the only bridge with a restaurant in North America, and was occupied by Mon Ami Louis between 2015 and 2020. Former leasees include Salisbury House, a local Winnipeg chain restaurant, and Chez Sophie.

=== CN Stage and Festival Park ===
The CN Stage is an outdoor stage with adjoining greenspace, built along the Broadway Promenade.

Many concerts and events in Winnipeg are held here. In the past, events have included annual Canada Day celebrations, 2017 Canada Summer Games Festival, Queen Elizabeth's 2010 visit, the 1999 Pan Am Games mainstage concerts, etc. In 2012, the signature events at the stage included Winnipeg's Pride Parade festival, Aboriginal Day Live hosted by APTN, and the Folklorama Kick-Off.

In the summer of 2004, a new pathway opened through Festival Park, connecting the Esplanade Riel pedestrian bridge with Union Station on Main Street.

=== The Forks Historic Port ===
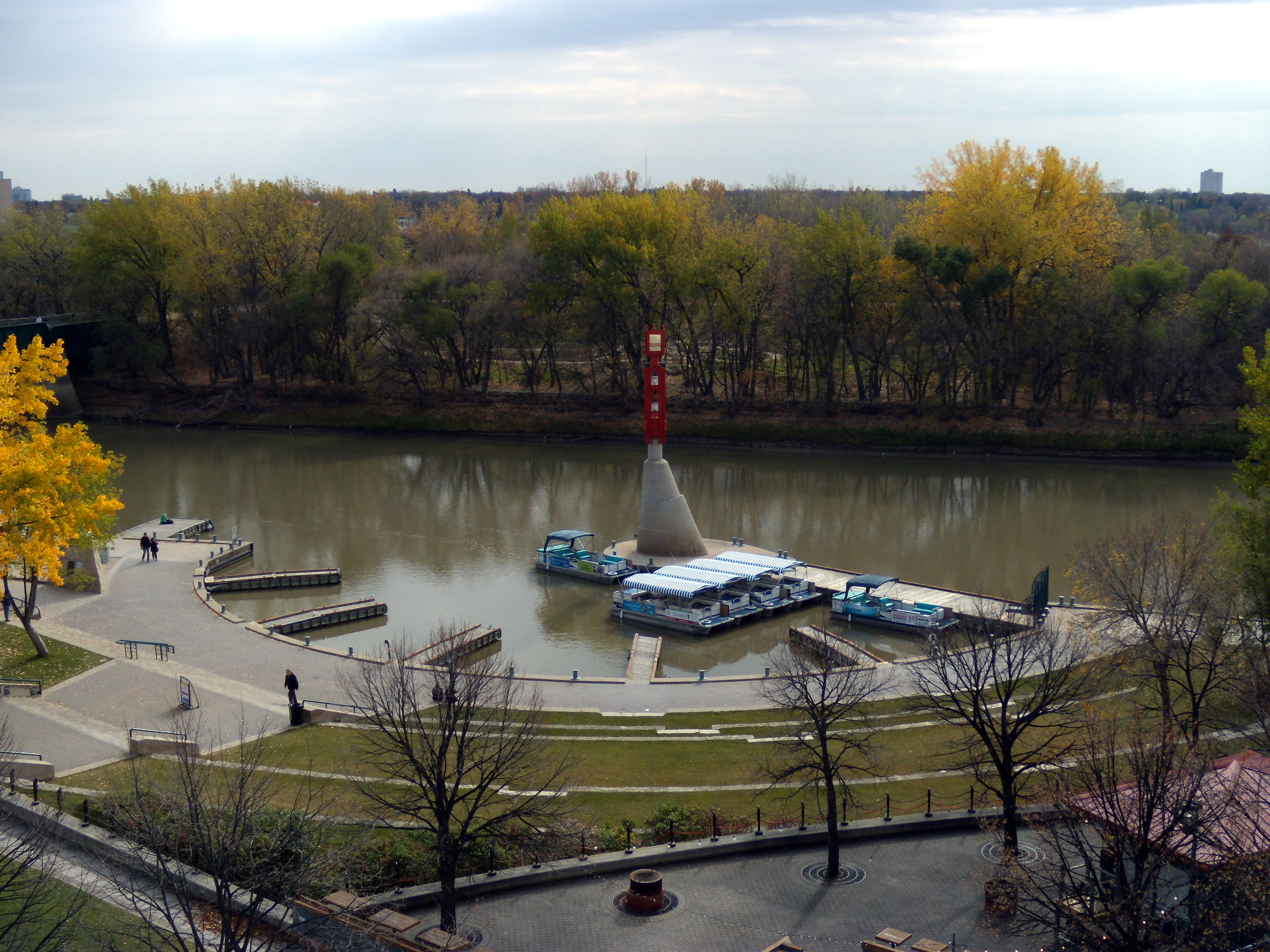
The Forks Historic Port

Positioned along the Assiniboine Riverwalk, the historic port offers river vessel docking and rental, as well as access to the Winnipeg Waterways Water Bus and River tours.

During times of flooding Winnipeg Waterways employs a movable ramp and floating dock system that allows it to operate in high water conditions.

=== Historic Rail Bridge ===
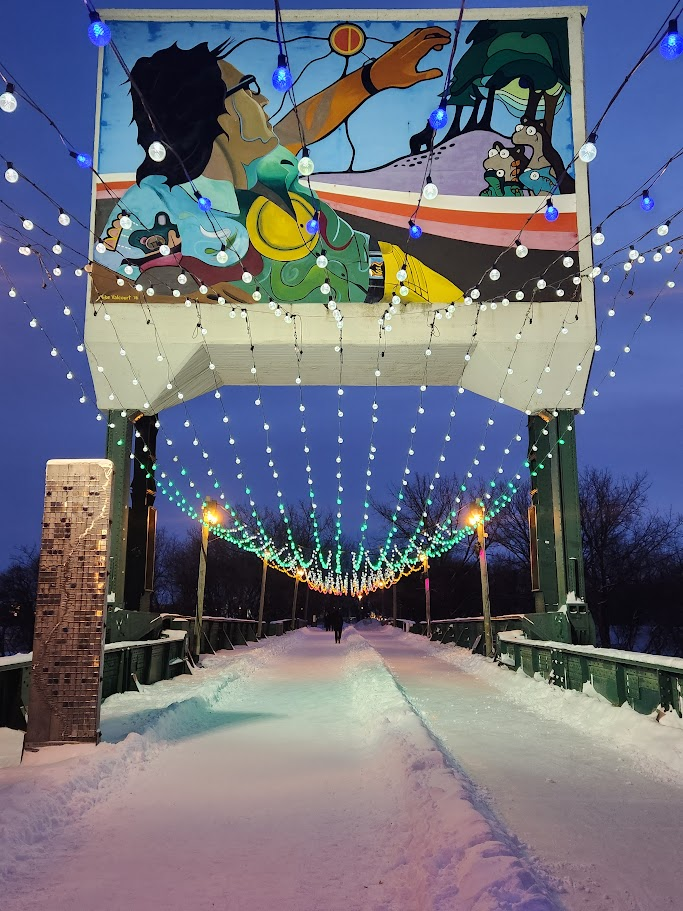
Peace Bridge in Winnipeg at the Forks along the Nestaweya River Trail

Built in 1888, the rail bridge was abandoned and eventually converted into a lighted crossing for pedestrians, cyclists and skaters. The mural on the side of the rail bridge is entitled "Jackson Beardy – Woodlands Group of Seven Tribute", and was painted in 2006 for Graffiti Gallery's Winnipeg International Mural Festival. The 30-foot wide and 20-foot tall mural pays tribute to Cree artist Jackson Beardy as well as the other members of the Indian Group of Seven.

=== Oodena Celebration Circle ===
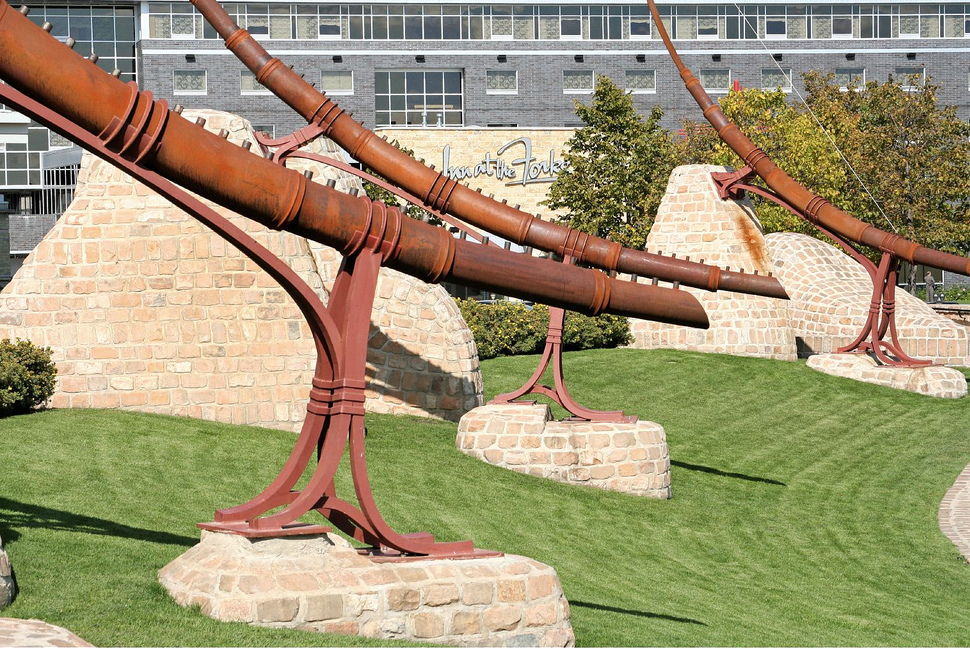
Armatures of the Oodena Celebration Circle

Oodena Celebration Circle is a natural shallow amphitheatre located between Johnston's Terminal, the Manitoba Children's Museum, and the Red River Riverwalk. Oodena is Ojibwe for 'centre of the city'. Commissioned in 1993, the site was designed by the firm of Hilderman Thomas Frank Cramm. The location features sculptures, a sundial, interpretive signage, a naked-eye observatory, and a ceremonial fire pit.

The circular amphitheatre is 60 metres (200 ft) in diameter and 2.5 metres (8.2 ft) deep. The 3 metres (9.8 ft) excavation for the site unearthed what is referred to by local archaeologists as "the archaic horizon", a 3,000-year-old layer of soil rich in artifacts.

There are eight unique steel armatures that rest on cobblestone formations surrounding the bowl. Each armature points at a specific constellation, according to dates and times indicated on the panels surrounding the central stage. Sighting rings on the armatures identify specific stars within the constellations. The supporting cobblestone formations bear inscriptions of various legends about the stars their armatures focus upon. The amphitheatre marks the vernal and autumnal equinox and the summer and winter solstices. "The south armature features a shadow rod that casts solstice shadows on ground markers, the west armature is fitted with a wind sculpture, and the northeast armature features an aeolian harp." (Hilderman Thomas Frank Cramm – Oodena Celebration Circle)

The site has been used as a meeting grounds for such varied events as "No Stone Unturned", a free concert in honour of Manitoba's missing and murdered women, as well as the 2011 opening night location for THIN AIR, the Winnipeg International Writers Festival and as the meeting location for Winnipeg's Zombie Walk 2012.

=== Gardens and orchard ===
The Forks' Prairie Garden is a 1,900 m^{2} (20,000 sq ft) garden featuring Manitoba's natural heritage. It was developed in 1999 in partnership with Nature Conservancy of Canada as a demonstration garden, in anticipation of it being a showcase for visitors at the 1999 Pan Am Games. The prairie garden is a natural wild garden with over 10,000 plants in over 150 native plant species, including 38 prairie plants such as prairie crocus, wild iris, bergamot, purple prairie clover, and wild columbine.

The Public Orchard, in collaboration with Winnipeg-CORE, contains 61 fruit trees including apple, apricot, cherry, pear, and plum, which the public can pick to eat from when the fruit is ripe. There are as many as 75 fruit bearing shrubs packed with all types of berries to pick from during the summer days. There are also many education sessions through Winnipeg-CORE that are open to the public, as part of The Fork's Target Zero initiative.

In collaboration with Citigrow, the Urban Garden contains vegetables and herbs to be harvested by the Inn at The Forks and integrated into their menu.

=== Skatepark ===
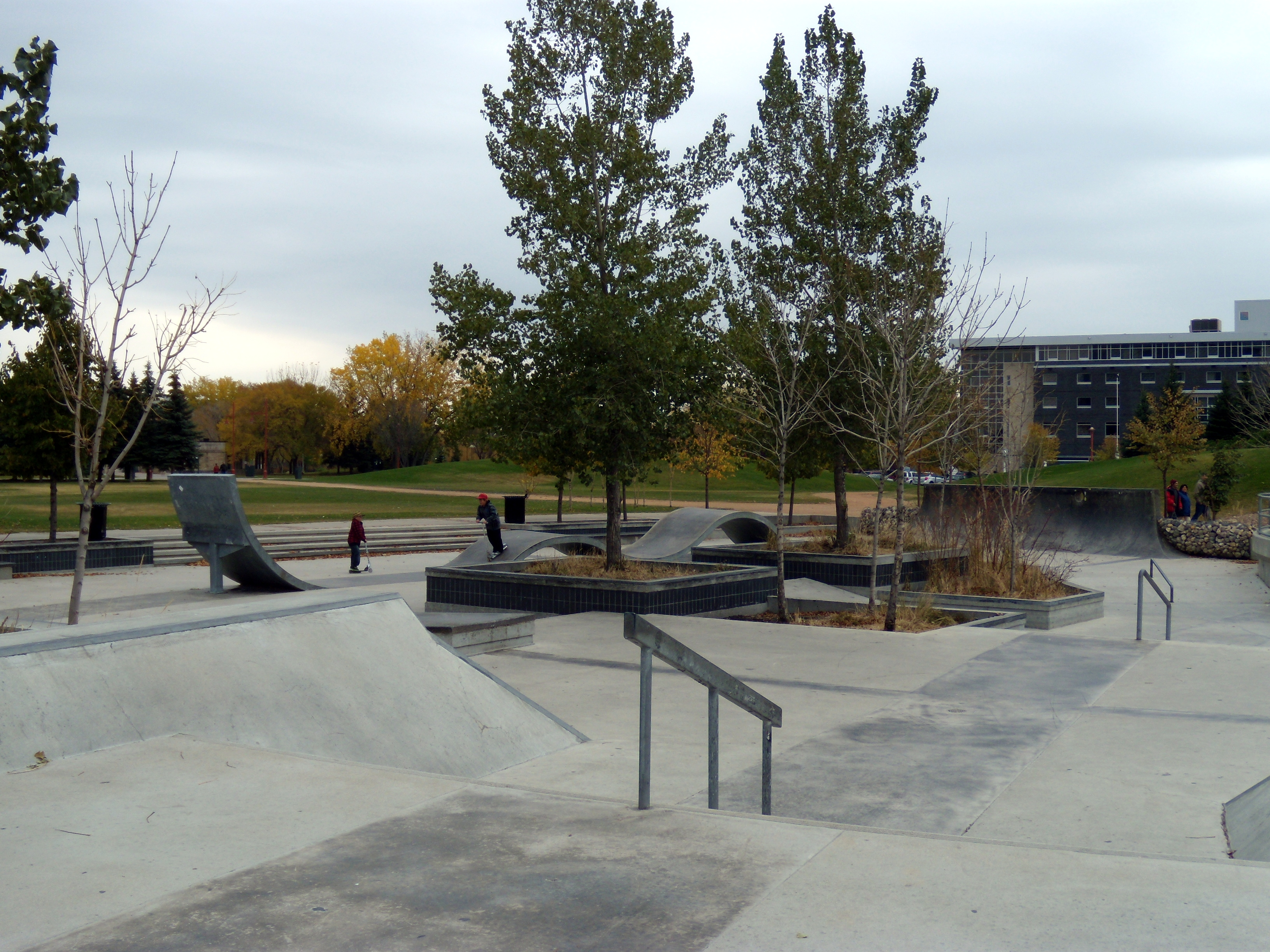
The Plaza Skatepark at the Forks

Officially opened 30 June 2006, "The Plaza" is the largest urban skate plaza and bowl complex in Canada. Announced in 2005, it was built with money donated from the J.W. Burns Family Foundation. The skatepark includes a 30,000-square-foot (2,800 m^{2}) skate plaza, and an 8,500-square-foot (790 m^{2}) 'bowl complex'.

The design features 'skateable' artwork, and is built to tolerate the regular use and enjoyment of skateboarders and cyclists. The park was also designed to integrate into the urban architecture of the city. It was designed by landscape architecture firm van der Zalm + associates inc. of Vancouver, BC with key team members, New Line Skateparks and Scatliff Miller Murray as the local landscape architects.

"Skate Patrol" are experienced skateboarder staff members that tour the park from dawn to dusk to educate skaters on the park's etiquette.

In winter, this area features a small snowboarding facility.

In 2006, the park was visited by professional skateboarder Tony Hawk to shoot scenes for his movie release Secret Skatepark Tour 3.

== Landmarks and other features ==
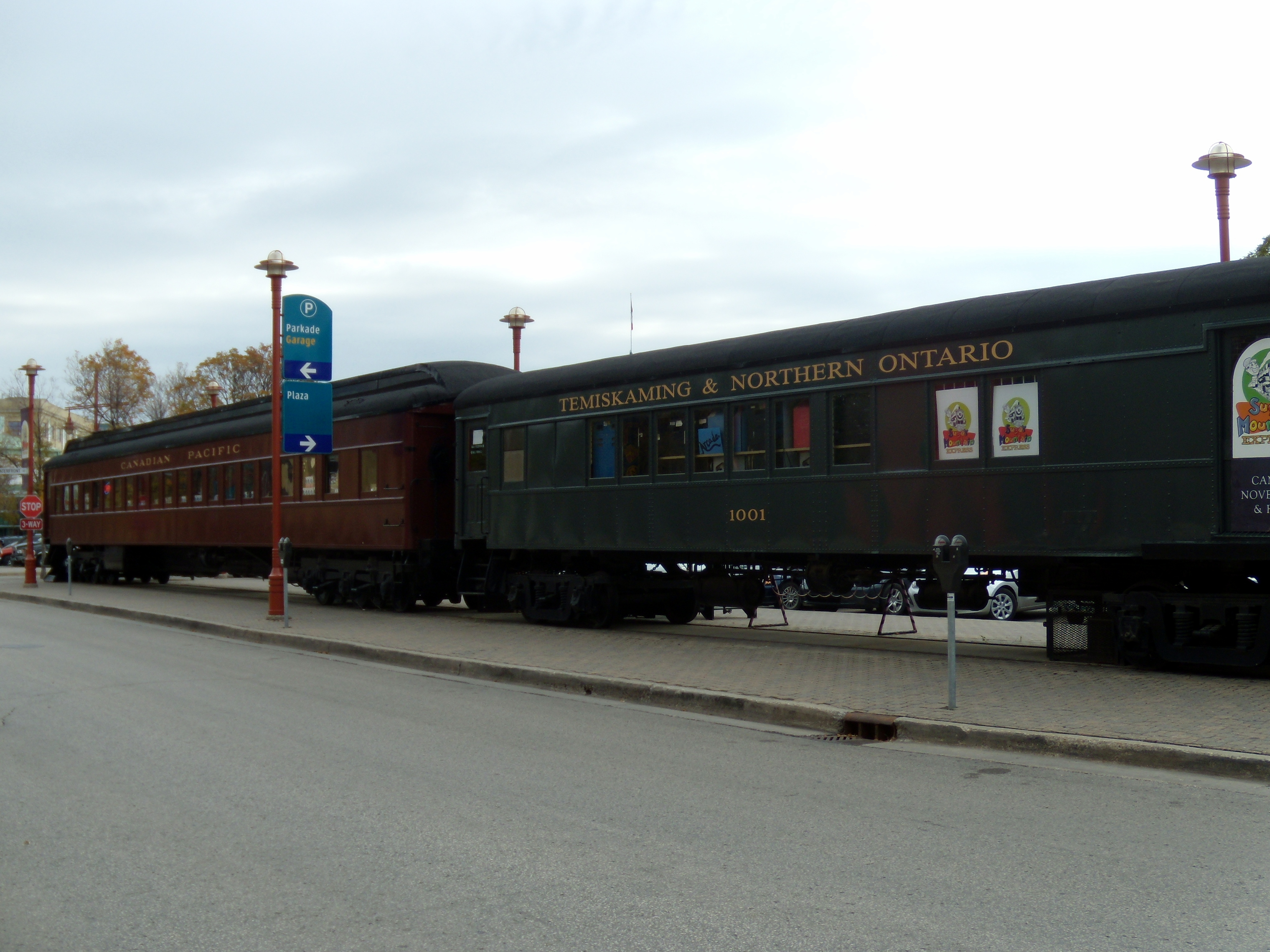
Rail cars at the Forks

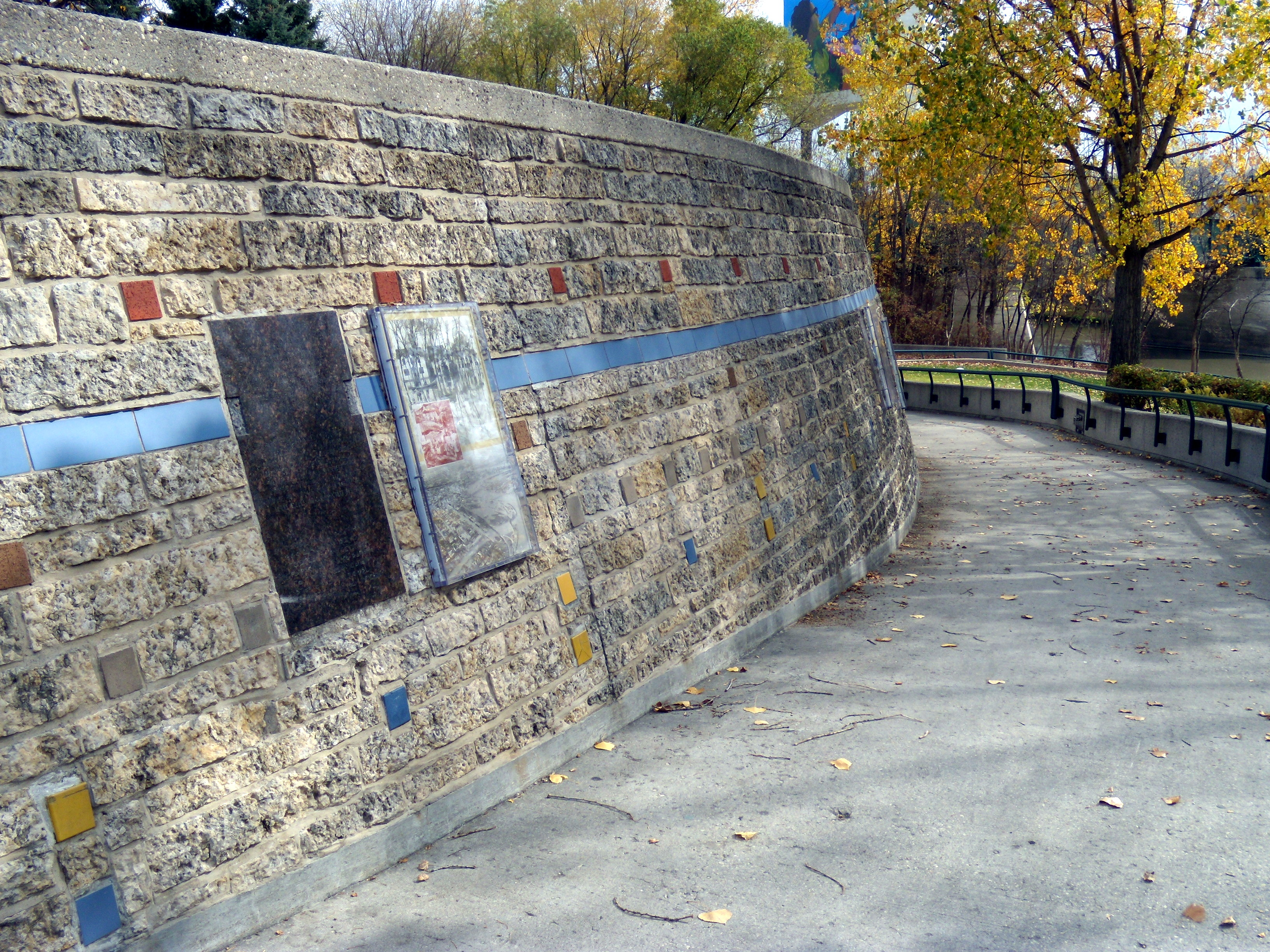
The "Wall Through Time" sculpture

- The Alloway Arch, located just east of Union Station, was constructed from the façade of the original Alloway and Champion Bank, which once stood at 362 Main Street and was the largest private bank in Western Canada in its time. One of the bank's owners, William Forbes Alloway, went on to establish The Winnipeg Foundation in 1921.
- "Balance of Spirit Within" is a granite stone sculpture weighing approximately 10 tonnes, and is located on the north side of the Forks Historic Rail Bridge.
- There are often buskers in and around The Forks. Buskers perform at stations known as "Busk Stops". They are paid by donation, but are prohibited from suggesting donation amounts or requesting contributions. There is an annual competition called the "Scotiabank Busker's Festival" at which it is decided who will be allowed to Busk.
- The posts on the canopy between The Forks Market and Johnston Terminal have bands on them to commemorate the peak water levels of major floods. Starting from the bottom of the posts, the bottom marker represents the 1950 flood, the middle marker represents both the 1852 and 1997 floods, and the top the flood of 1826. The flood line markers on one of the posts have historic plaques with information on the floods they represent.
- Niimaamaa is a stylized sculpture of a pregnant woman, made by artists KC Adams, Jaimie Isaac, and Val Vint. Created in 2018, the sculpture is made of painted steel, copper, and corten metal. The word niimaamaa is recognized by Cree, Ojibwe, and Métis speakers as 'My mother', and is meant to represent "motherhood, Mother Earth and new beginnings".
- The "Peace Meeting" interpretive site is a landscaped resting area along the Broadway Promenade, featuring Indigenous and European elements, notable for having two gigantic Adirondack chairs. The site was created via a grant from The Winnipeg Foundation.
- Just outside The Forks Market are two completely restored turn-of-the-century rail cars. One car is for display, while the other is home to "Sugar Mountain Express", a candy store.
- The Variety Heritage Adventure Playground is an educational play structure for children, featuring water park elements.
- "Wall Through Time" is a sculpture depicting the history of the Forks, which features two bronze shells and a limestone centrepiece. The sculpture is located on the western edge of a major North American archeological find.

=== Pan Am Games Monument ===
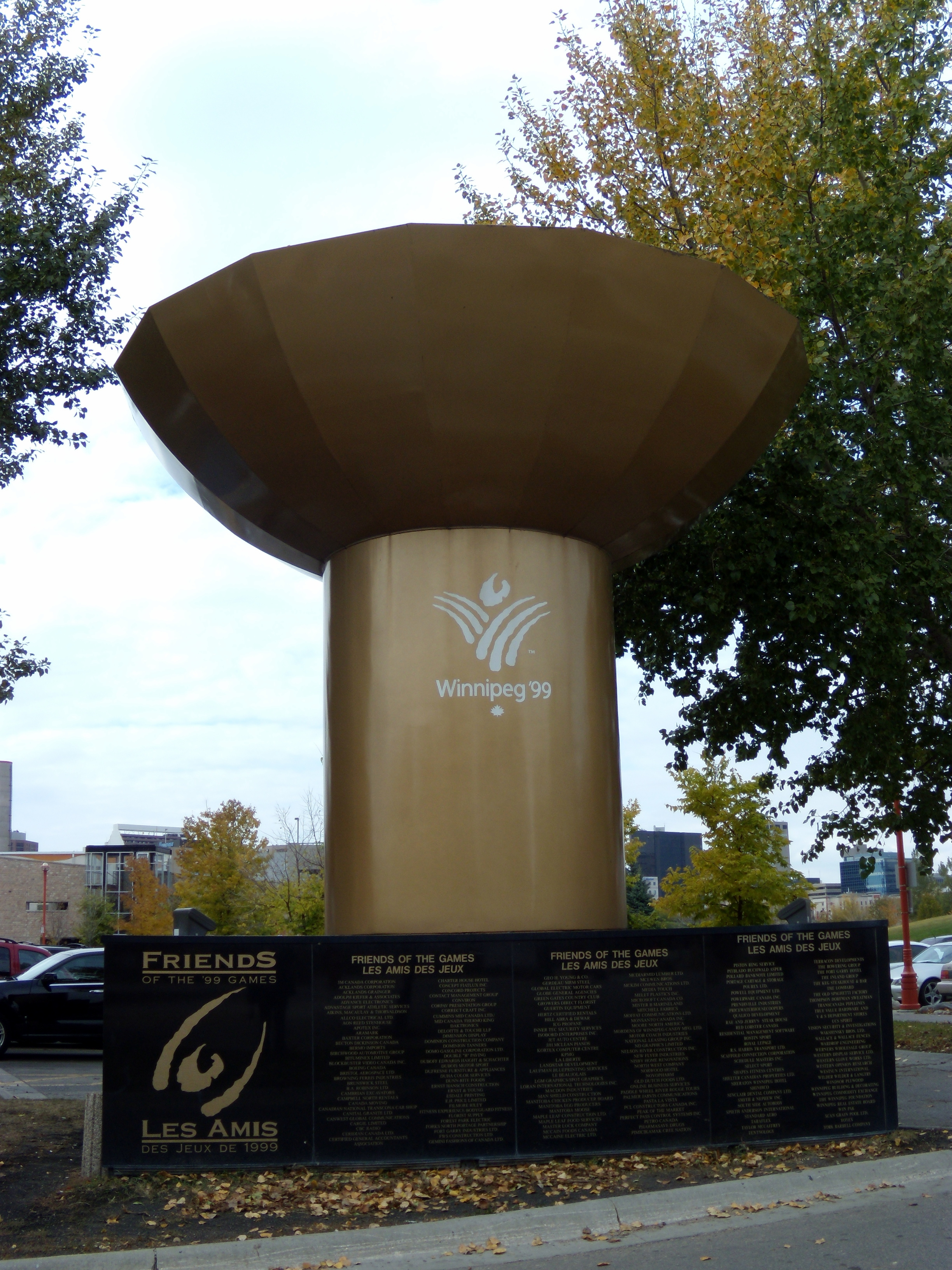
Pan Am Games Monument

Located beside the Inn at the Forks, the Pan Am Games Monument recognizes the governments, companies, and individuals who supported the 1999 Pan American Games in Winnipeg. The monument served as the flame cauldron for the games. The 1999 Pan Am Games mainstage concerts were held at the Forks' Stage and Festival Park.

== Events ==
The Forks hosts over 200 third-party and signature events throughout the year, most of which are free.

Canada Day

Canada Day at the Forks is an all day event, with activities happening throughout the Forks grounds, and culminating in either a fireworks or drone show.

Salsa Sundays

Salsa Sundays is a weekly event run at the Forks under the canopy during the summer, featuring free dance instruction and demonstrations set to live Latin music and DJ mixes.

=== Winnipeg International Children's Festival ===
The Winnipeg International Children's Festival is a children's festival held annually at The Forks National Historic Park. Founded in 1983, it was held at Assiniboine Park, then at Kildonan Park from 1984 through 1989, and eventually moving to its present location in 1990. The festival is made up of over 30 acts, held over four days, totalling about 120 performances.

== Future projects ==
The following projects are part of the ten-year revitalization plan for The Forks.

- Rail Side Lot
- Upper Fort Garry Heritage Park
- South Point
- Promenade Lighting Strategy
- The Forks Sculpture Program
- Waterfront Vision
- Living spaces developing at The Forks
- Composting at The Forks
- Revival of the historic Rail Bridge

== Climate ==
Climate data for Winnipeg The Forks
Month	Jan	Feb	Mar	Apr	May	Jun	Jul	Aug	Sep	Oct	Nov	Dec	Year
Record high °C (°F)	8.6 (47.5)	9.2 (48.6)	23.2 (73.8)	27.4 (81.3)	34.9 (94.8)	35.0 (95.0)	35.7 (96.3)	36.4 (97.5)	33.0 (91.4)	31.1 (88.0)	19.0 (66.2)	8.0 (46.4)	36.4 (97.5)
Mean daily maximum °C (°F)	−10.1 (13.8)	−8.7 (16.3)	0.1 (32.2)	10.6 (51.1)	17.3 (63.1)	23.1 (73.6)	26.6 (79.9)	25.3 (77.5)	20.2 (68.4)	11.0 (51.8)	1.3 (34.3)	−7.7 (18.1)	9.1 (48.4)
Daily mean °C (°F)	−14.2 (6.4)	−13.1 (8.4)	−4.5 (23.9)	5.3 (41.5)	12.0 (53.6)	18.1 (64.6)	21.6 (70.9)	20.2 (68.4)	15.1 (59.2)	6.9 (44.4)	−2.3 (27.9)	−11.3 (11.7)	4.5 (40.1)
Mean daily minimum °C (°F)	−18.1 (−0.6)	−17.4 (0.7)	−9.2 (15.4)	0.0 (32.0)	6.6 (43.9)	13.0 (55.4)	16.4 (61.5)	15.0 (59.0)	9.8 (49.6)	2.7 (36.9)	−5.8 (21.6)	−14.9 (5.2)	−0.2 (31.6)
Record low °C (°F)	−35.8 (−32.4)	−33.1 (−27.6)	−32.2 (−26.0)	−15 (5)	−6.3 (20.7)	1.8 (35.2)	7.1 (44.8)	5.7 (42.3)	−1.3 (29.7)	−8.5 (16.7)	−24.1 (−11.4)	−32.2 (−26.0)	−35.8 (−32.4)
Average precipitation mm (inches)	19.5 (0.77)	14.1 (0.56)	31.3 (1.23)	31.0 (1.22)	81.5 (3.21)	97.1 (3.82)	76.1 (3.00)	70.0 (2.76)	47.9 (1.89)	35.0 (1.38)	26.6 (1.05)	23.5 (0.93)	553.6 (21.80)
Source: Environment Canada, 1999–2016 Normals & Extremes
