= Nestaweya River Trail =

Urban multi-use trail in Manitoba, Canada

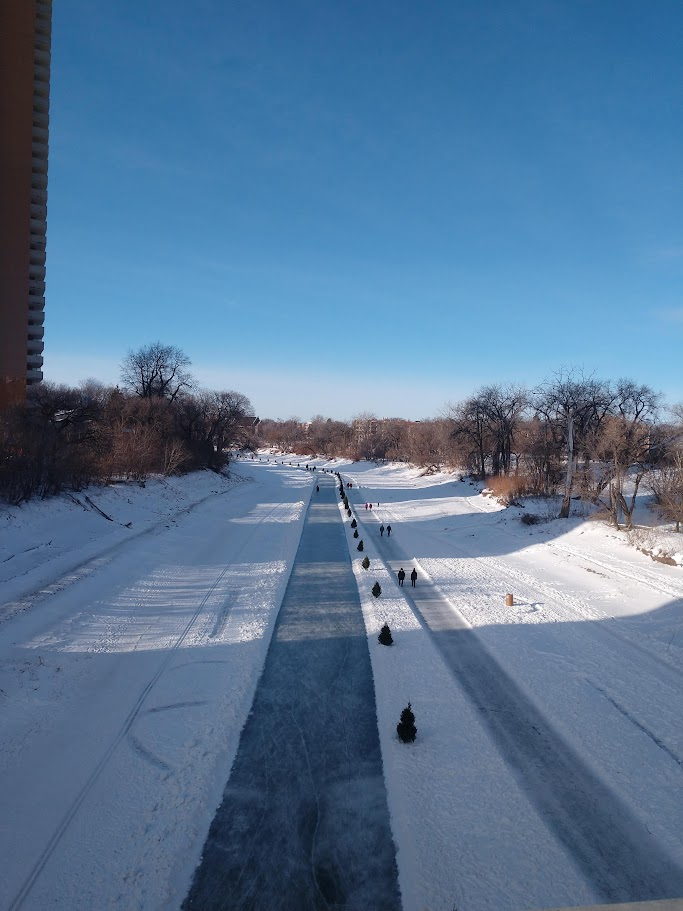
- The Nestaweya River Trail from the Osborne Bridge facing Armstrong's Point
- Length: 6 km (3.7 mi)
- Location: Winnipeg, stretching between the Hugo Docks on the Assiniboine River and Churchill Drive on the Red River
- Established: 2008
- Trailheads: Assiniboine River: Hugo Docks, Osborne Bridge, Donald St. Bridge, and the Forks; Red River: The Forks, Queen Elizabeth Bridge, Churchill Drive
- Use: Ice Skating; Winter cycling; Cross Country Skiing; hiking
- Surface: Ice
- Maintainer: The Forks Foundation

The Nestaweya River Trail is a Winnipeg, Canada, tradition dating back to the winter of 1990, with variations of skating on the rivers dating back even further. The trail is built annually, as conditions allow, through the two rivers that connect the city. The trail's activities include walking, running, biking, skating and cross country skiing. The trail also features warming huts made by local artist, pop up restaurants, curling, and other special events. Once fully open, the trail typically spans over six kilometres and remains accessible for over 50 days each winter.

When the trail is at full length and the weather is not extremely cold or snowy, the river trail can see tens of thousands of skaters in a single weekend. The Forks reports that for a typical longer season, the trail accommodates more than 200,000 people over the course of its roughly 50-day season. On the nicer days in February, the trail can see between 50,000 and 60,000 users in a single day.

The longest season lasted 76 days in 2018-2019 and the least amount of time the trail was open was just nine days in 2023–2024. There has only been one winter since 1990, when the river trail was first offered, that it did not open at all. That was in 2019-2020 due to poor freezing conditions on the rivers. The trail did open in 2020–2021 at a wider length to accommodate social distancing during the COVID-19 pandemic.

== History ==
The Nestaweya River Trail first opened as a Zamboni cleaned skating path in 1990, but evidence on Winnipeggers using the rivers as an ice skating trail date back to 1872. Charles Napier Bell, A military man under the command of Sir Garnet Wolseley, fighting in the Red River Rebellion, is said to have introduced ice skating to the area. After Louis Riel fled Winnipeg, an 18-year old Bell took a trip to Ontario and returned with ice skates he used in the winter of 1872 and got a lot of attention from the locals. As his actions became more noticed, he was joined by other militiamen who had come from Ontario and were stationed at the Osborne barracks, near the current Manitoba Legislative Building. The troops cleared a space on the Assiniboine River, near the modern Osborne Bridge, and named it as Victoria Rink, in honour of the Queen. In January, 1873, local media had begun promoting the rink and declared ice skating to be the biggest new activity in town.

In November, 1874, After the Red River Colony and the City of Winnipeg merged, new construction began on Winnipeg's Amphitheatre, a seasonal skating rink on the Red River maintained by the city. The rink was an initial success, until the warming huts collapsed in a winter storm halfway through its first season. The first reports of ice hockey being played on the river come from the Winnipeg Free Press in the winter of 1886–87. The story goes that Patrick Anderson Macdonald, who also founded the Assiniboine Curling Club and the Winnipeg Rowing Club, brought the first hockey sticks to Manitoba.

As Winnipeg expanded and the prominence of indoor rinks and neighbourhood maintained flooded outdoor rinks developed, the activity of skating on the rivers themselves diminished until the 1990s, when the organizers of the Festival du Voyageur began to clean off parts of a bend in the Red, near Whittier Park. Since then, the Trail opens with varied lengths and times of operations and is maintained by the non-profit organization that runs The Forks. The length can range from a couple of kilometres to setting a Guinness Book of World Records length of 9.3 kilometers (6.1 miles) in 2008. The trail broke its own record and extended to 10 kilometres in 2017–18. The record for the longest year of operation was the winter of 2019–20, when the trail was open for 72 days.

The Plaza at The Forks provides skate rentals and a place to have food and drinks inside along the trail. Additionally the plaza has two skating rinks, one under the main canopy and another in front of the CN Stage at the Canadian Museum of Human Rights. The two rinks are connected by an above ground skating trail and supplemented by other local vendors and musicians.

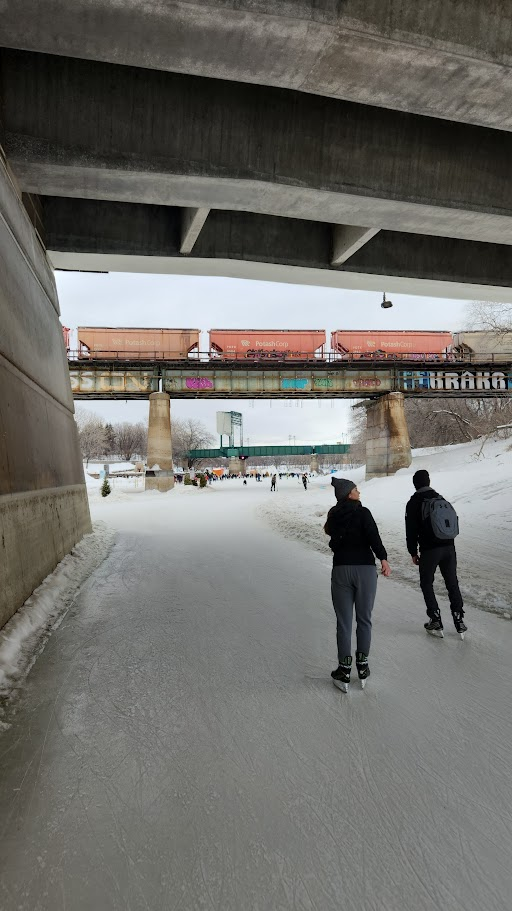
Train over The Nestaweya River Trail facing The Forks

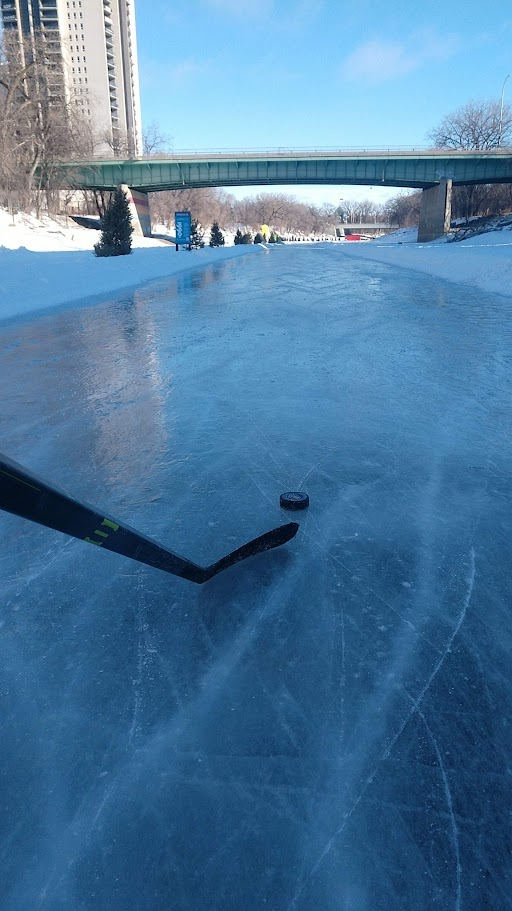
Ice Hockey on the Nestaweya River Trail

Winnipeggers can support the River trail by adopting a meter with a $50 donation to The Forks Foundation. In 2026, community members adopted 1,270 meters of trail, with the funds raised going to help support maintenance and operations.

== Events ==
Warming huts are a primary feature of the skating trail. Adding new structures has been an annual tradition since 2010. The installations serve as both a shelter from the cold and also serve as interactive art exhibits loaded with meaning. New huts are added annually via two competitions, one for local artists and one for international artists, and the students at the University of Manitoba also add a new hut every year. Some of the warming huts unveiled in past winters get brought back on an annual basis. The winning huts and past favourites line the river trail along a path of approximately 650 spent Christmas trees.

Started in 2009, Warming Huts: An Art + Architecture Competition on Ice has been responsible for the warming huts that line the river trail. Winning entries will be placed along the Nestaweya River Trail. A jury selects the winning designs based on their "creativity in use of materials, providing shelter, poetics of assembly and form, integration with the landscape, and ease of construction."

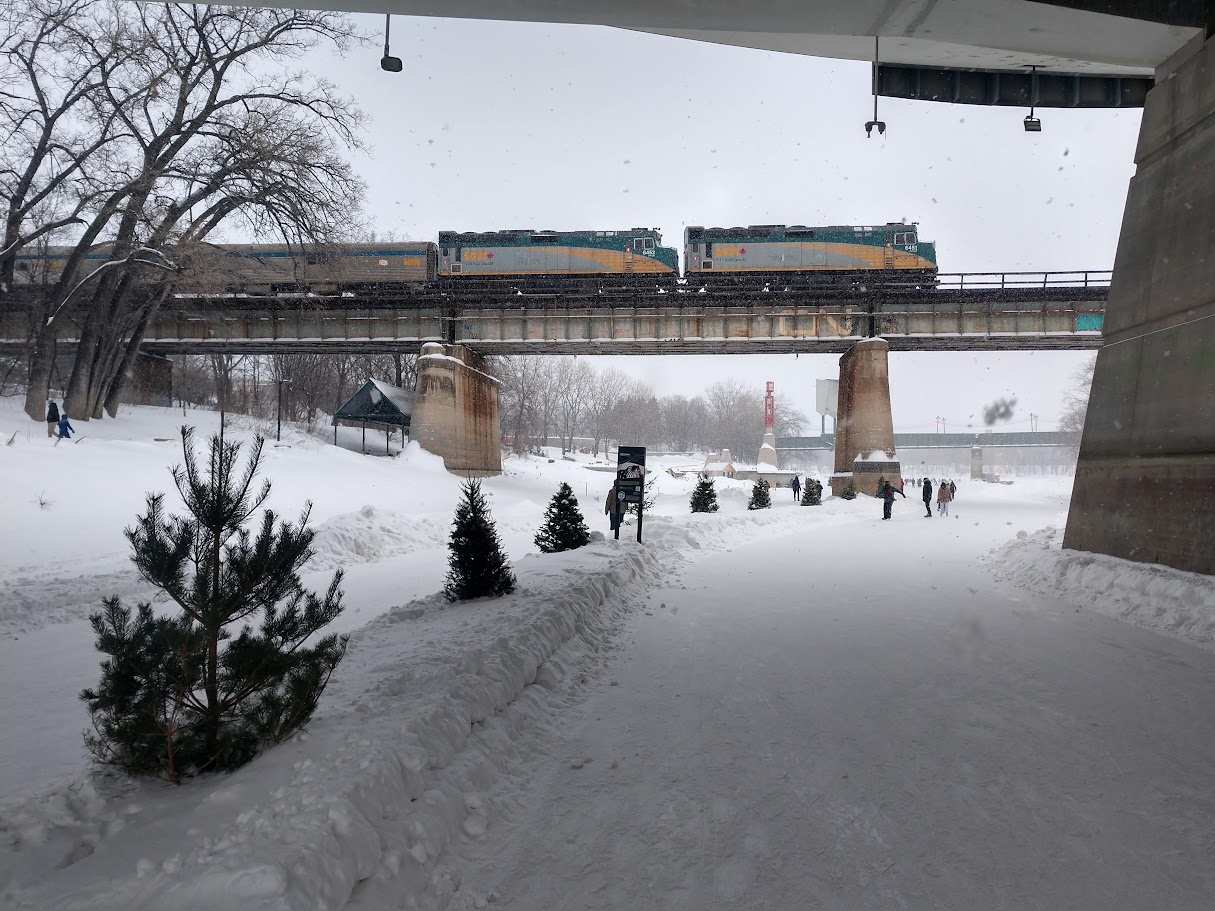
VIA Rail Train over the Nestaweya River Trail.

Warming Huts is an open competition, supported by the Manitoba Association of Architects. Proposals for the competition are submitted online to be voted on by the jury. Nearing the end of January, competition winners selected by the jury are invited to travel to Winnipeg to begin construction on their warming hut. The weeklong event gives designers a chance to watch their vision come to life while allowing the public to watch them at work. The budget for the creation and construction of each project is $16,500 (CAN).

"Raw:Almond," a pop-up restaurant run by the owners of local restaurant Deer and Almond, is located on the rivers at The Forks and is open evenings. During the day, the tent also hosts other local sandwich shops and private events.

The Rock the River Winter Festival is Canada's largest outdoor curling bonspiel and a fundraiser for the Heart and Stroke Foundation. The event takes place annually since 2002 on the Red River along the Nestaweya River Trail. The event can now field up to 80 teams of all skill levels and takes place on the first full weekend of February every year.

== Indigenous roots ==
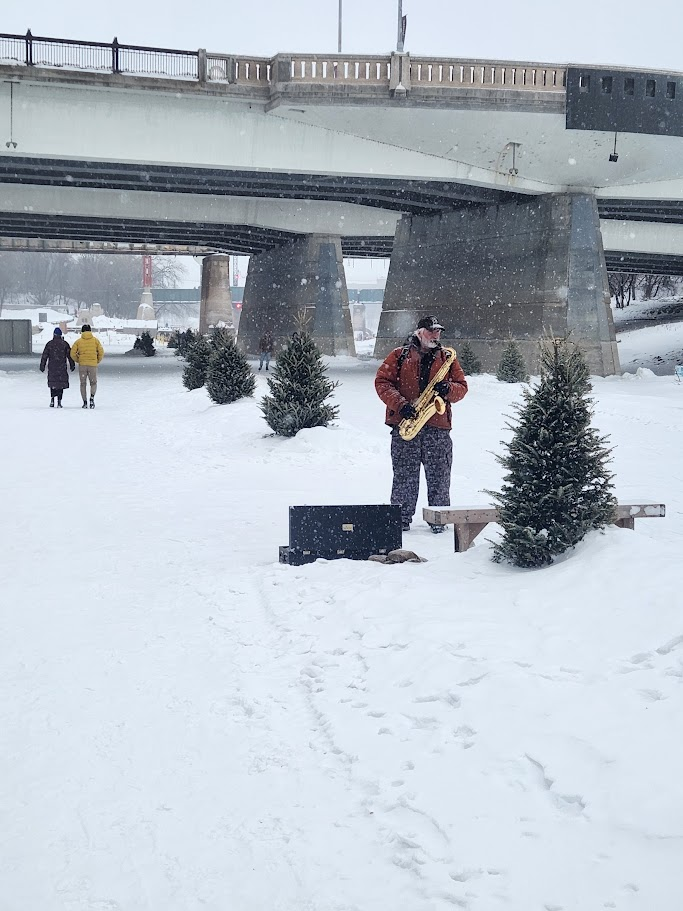
Saxophone Player on the Nestaweya River Trail.

The name Nestaweya honours the original Cree name for the area now known as Winnipeg. Nestaweya means "three points," reflecting how people historically accessed the site by river from three directions, Cree from the north on the Red River, Ojibway from the south on the Red River, and Lakota/Dakota/Nakota or Assiniboine from the west on the Assiniboine River. The name recognizes the deep history of the rivers as gathering places and travel routes long before The Forks became the modern tourist attraction it is today.

The Foundation that runs the river trail is now involved in refurbishing Niizhoziibean, the southernmost point of The Forks. This project honours Winnipeg's Indigenous heritage and will include a new path of entry to the river trail for Winnipeggers coming from the Norwood neighbourhood. Niizhoziibean, which means two rivers in Ojibway, is intended to inspire new pathways for reconciliation.

== Warming Hut Competition Winners ==
Winning Warming Huts
Year	Warming hut	Designer or design team
2010	FIR HUT	Richard Kroeker in collaboration with Neil Forrest
2010	CARCASS	Sputnik Architecture in collaboration with Jon Pylypchuk
2011	Under the Covers	Robert B. Trempe Jr.
2012	Wind Catcher	Tina Soli and Luca Roncoroni
2012	Rope Pavilion	Kevin Erickson and Allison Warren
2013	Hygge House	Public City, Urbanink and Pike Projects
2013	The Smokehouse	aaMODT / PLUMB architects
2014	Windshield	Kate Busby and Bella Totino
2014	Skybox	University of Manitoba
2015	Recycling Words	KANVA, in collaboration with Maureen Matthews
2015	The Hole Idea	Weiss Architecture & Urbanism Limited
2016	In the Light of the Kudluk	Tanya Tagaq and Sputnik Architecture
2016	Shelterbelt	Robert B. Trempe Jr.
2016	Temple	Kirill Bair and Daria Lisitsyna
2017	Ice Lantern	Lisa Tondino, Alexandra Bolen, Mathew Rodrigues and Drew Klassen
2017	Open Border	Joyce de Grauw and Paul van den Berg
2017	Greetings from Bubble Beach	site design group ltd. and SMP Group Design Associates LLC
2018	Golden Bison	David Alberto Arroyo Tafolla
2018	The Trunk	Camille Bianchi and Ryder Thalheimer
2018	Totem	Architecture Office b210
2018	#HugMug	Grade 11 art students of Mennonite Brethren Collegiate Institute and teacher Merlin Braun
2018	PONTAGON	University of Manitoba Faculty of Architecture and the City of Winnipeg Customer Service and Communications
2019	Weathermen	Haemee Han and Jaeyual Lee of JAEMEE Studio
2019	Huttie	Jennie O'Keefe and Chris Pancoe
2020	Cloud of Unintended Consequences	Eleanor Bond with the University of Manitoba Faculty of Architecture
2020	The Stand	Manitoba Building Trades and Mistecture Architecture and Interiors Inc.
2021	Yöhäus	Karina Leong and Jeremy Chan
2021	Divergence	Thomas Cheney, Thomas Cheney Architects
2021	Hot Landing	AtLRG Architecture Inc.
2021	The Droombok	Noël Picaper, Onomiau (Office for Nomadic Architecture)
2021	The Benesii (Thunderbird)	Scatliff + Miller + Murray
2022	Blossom	Frontier School Division Engaged Learners program
2022	Al Simmons: Sounds Crazy	Al Simmons and Karl Simmons
2022	AA Warmer Place	University of Manitoba Faculty of Architecture
2022	Singin' in the Shower	Luca Roncoroni and Tina Soli
2022	Sunset	Democratic Architects
2022	Warming Inflation Hands	Popper Zhu
2023	Flowing Lands	University of Manitoba Faculty of Architecture
2023	NIX	Wanda Koop and Thom Fougere
2023	Curtain	Alejandro Felix and Fang Cui
2023	Hayspace	Philipp Gmür and Hugh Taylor
2023	Meanwhile We Still Dream	Lindo Jia and Jaymon Diaz
2023	Azhe'o	Students and staff of St. John's High School
2024	Murky Waters	Christopher Loofs, Jordan Loofs and Kaci Marshall
2025	Rosemary Skool	Jaimie Isaac and Suzanne Morrissette
2025	Prairie Castle	Nick Green and Greg Pirrie
2025	Wrong Turn	Christopher Loofs, Jordan Loofs and Kaci Marshall
2025	The Pom Pom	Hallen Deng and Isla Song
2025	Prototype Home	Students and staff of the University of Manitoba Faculty of Architecture
2025	The Present	Students and staff of Exchange Met School
2026	Continuum	Franziska Agrawal
2026	Wildlife Scramble	Jessica Colangelo, Charles Sharpless, Ashley Colangelo and Adrian Gonzalez
2026	Dram	Noel Picaper and Joffrey About
2026	Moon Rabbit	Yu Liu
2026	Bridge-Stairs for John Hejduk	University of Manitoba Environmental Design Studio
2026	Warm Up With a Great Book	Grade 7 students of Bison Run School
2026	Heartwarming Hut	Travel Manitoba
