= Rock the River Winter Festival =

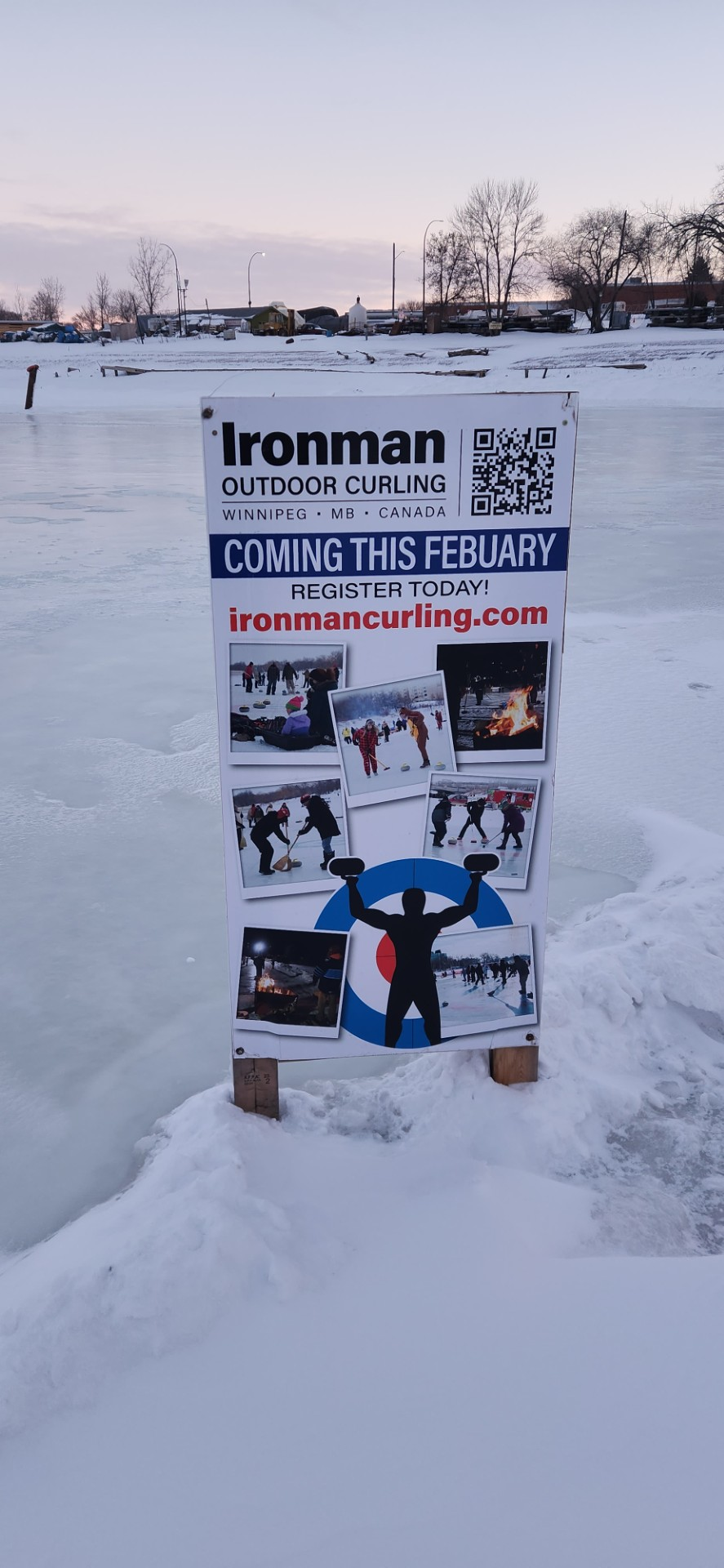
- Established: 2002
- Host city: Winnipeg, Manitoba
- Arena: Outdoors on the Red River

The Rock the River Winter Festival, formerly known as the Ironman Outdoor Curling Bonspiel, is Canada's largest outdoor curling bonspiel and a fundraiser for the Heart and Stroke Foundation. The event takes place annually since 2002 on the Red River along the Nestaweya River Trail. The event can now field up to 80 teams of all skill levels and takes place on the first full weekend of February every year.

== History ==
The inaugural event was held the Forks Historic Port where the Red River meats the Assiniboine River on February 15–16, 2002. Founders Eric Dawson and Kevin Wiebe attracted 14 curling teams and hosted the events on 2 official size sheets of ice with full size curling rocks. The founding principal for this annual event was that the bonspiel should always be available to everyone of all skill levels, and that funds raised from the bonspiel should go to charity.

As the event grew in popularity, the hosting foundation required more space and moved the location south along the Red River to the Winnipeg Rowing Club, then even further south to the Redboine Boat Club. The event now involves eight sheets of curling ice and teams are guaranteed to play three games round robin style games throughout the bonspiel. Games are 6 ends or 70 minutes, and tie games go to skip stones.

The Ironman Outdoor Curling Bonspiel has grown beyond its basic weekend event to include a new high school tournament that launched in 2025. This high school tournament takes place on the Friday of the Bonspiel, during the day before the opening matches of the main tournament that evening.

The Heart and Stroke Foundation was selected as the main charity, given that the event takes place in February, which is Heart and Stroke Awareness Month. Since 2002, more than $212,320 has been raised for local charities in Winnipeg, and in 2023, the event set a new record with $26,395.69 raised. This is the longest-running fundraiser for the Heart & Stroke Foundation.

While the event is set for the first full weekend in February every year, warm weather can cause issues. Tournament organizers have implied cold temperatures, and snow cannot stop the event, but sunshine and heat can make for unsafe or unplayable ice conditions. Warm weather has caused delays to the event, but only the COVID-19 pandemic has been responsible for its cancellation since its inception.

In 2026, the event was renamed The Rock the River Winter Festival and partnered with Canadian Broadcasting Corporation to live stream the finals on Sunday.

== List of Champions ==
Year	Champion
2002	Team: Shovel’s Thompson Michael Thompson, Judy Thompson, Eric Dawson, and Sarah Dawson
2003	Team: Dahl Rink Lindsey Dahl, Kara Isaak, Terry Isaak and Deanna Betteridge
2004	Team: Leckie Rink Scott Leckie, Fred Klatt, Alan Dalkie, Don Gaye and Greg Harris
2005	Team: Scooby Doo & the Gang David Ellie, John Blakeston, Don Myers and Garry Parker.
2006	Team: Rob Sendall Rob Sendall, Dean Sisler, Jeff Sendall, Steve Sendall and Kevin Sendall
2007	Team: Drawson Fred Klatt, Kent Hay, Eric Dawson and Gordon Craig
2008	Team: The Hoovers Chris Chimuk, David Stastook, Bryan Zachary and Don Hunt
2009	Team: The Hoovers Chris Chimuk, David Stastook, Bryan Zachary and Don Hunt
2010	Team: The Hoovers Chris Chimuk, David Stastook, Bryan Zachary and Don Hunt
2011	Team: Bratwurst & Donut Combo Chris Gesell, Anders Prokopowhich, Rick Romaniuk and Rene Hiebert
2012	Team: That Symbol That Prince Was For A Bit In the 90’s Brian Forrester, Bradley Hunt, Angela Hunt and Jeff Blonjeaux
2013	Team: Drawson Eric Dawson, Kent Hay, Gordon Craig and Derek Hayward
2014	Team: Old Cold and On The Rocks Bob Petri, Jeff Goertzen, Darren Goertzen and Tim Jonstrud
2015	Team: #KimMitchellGreyCup2015 Bradley Hunt, Brian Forrester, Angela Green and Tyler Green.
2016	Team: Winnipleg Brew Birfs Kyle Kurz, Colin Kurz, Scott Kurz and Melissa Gordon
2017	Team: Old Cold and on the Rocks Bob Petri, Jeff Goertzen, Darren Goertzen and Robyn Beninger
2018	Team: I swept with your wife… Brent Farguson, Jack Lavallee, Brian Melville and Glenn Henderson.
2019	Team: I swept with your wife… Brent Farguson, Jack Lavallee, Brian Melville and Glenn Henderson.
2020	Team: Hack Job Travis Almey, Sarah Lefebvre, Lauren Canning and Dave Van Drongelen.
2021	Team: Four! Kelly Kiddell, Karleigh Philpott, Aimee West and Ewelina Fiedur
2022	Team: Hack Job Travis Almey, Sarah Lefebvre, Lauren Canning and Dave Van Drongelen.
2023	Team: The Brokenheads Stacy Johnson, Daren McKellar, Jason Goetting and Jason Thorvaldson
2024	Event not held due to weather
2025	Team: Birds Hillbillies Adrian Kowalchuk, Chris Kowalchuk, Jeremy Kusyk, Graham Fast and Travis Lylyk.
2026	Team: Keep Calm & Curl On! Andrea Usackis, Bill Munroe, Carmelle Gauthier and Duane Jordan.r

== Gallery ==
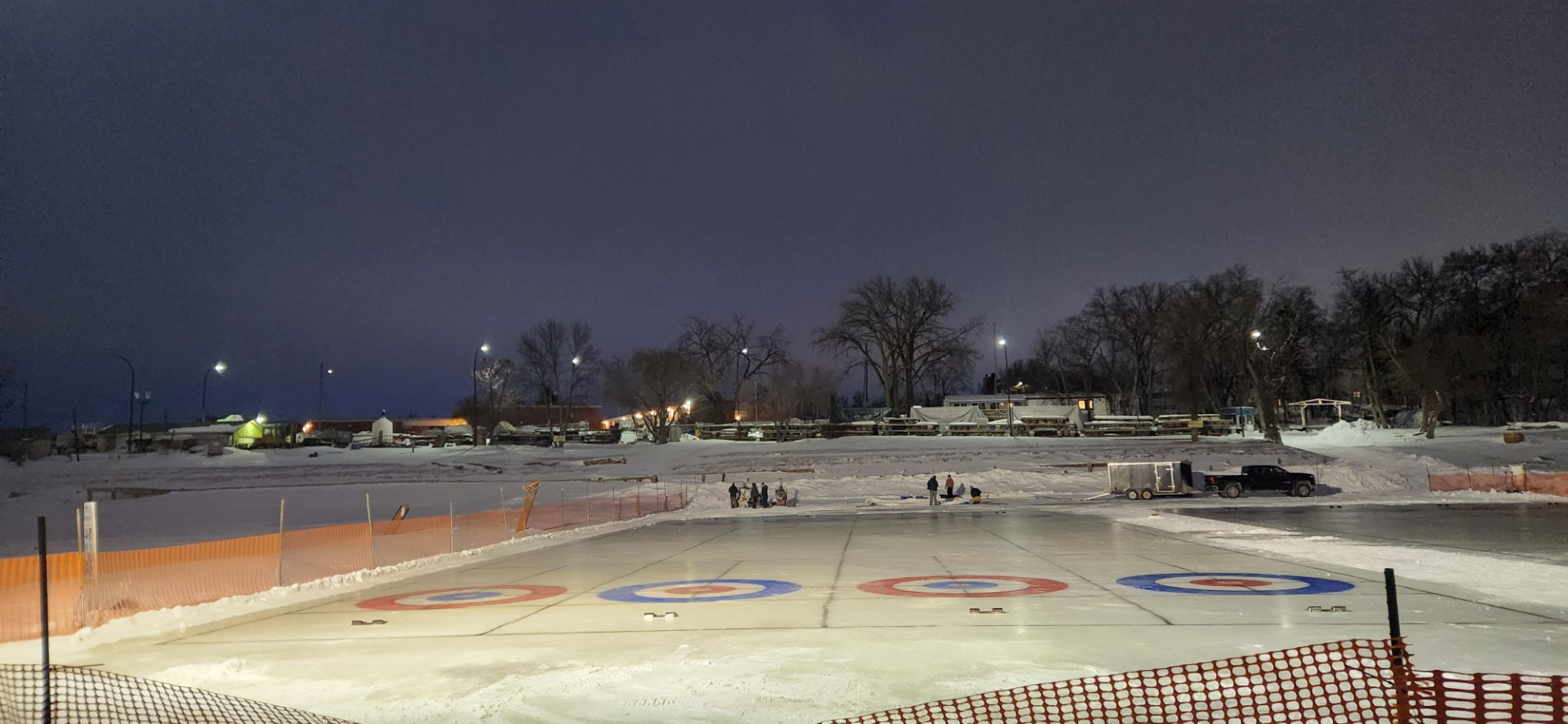
Rock the River Winter Festival Rinks at night

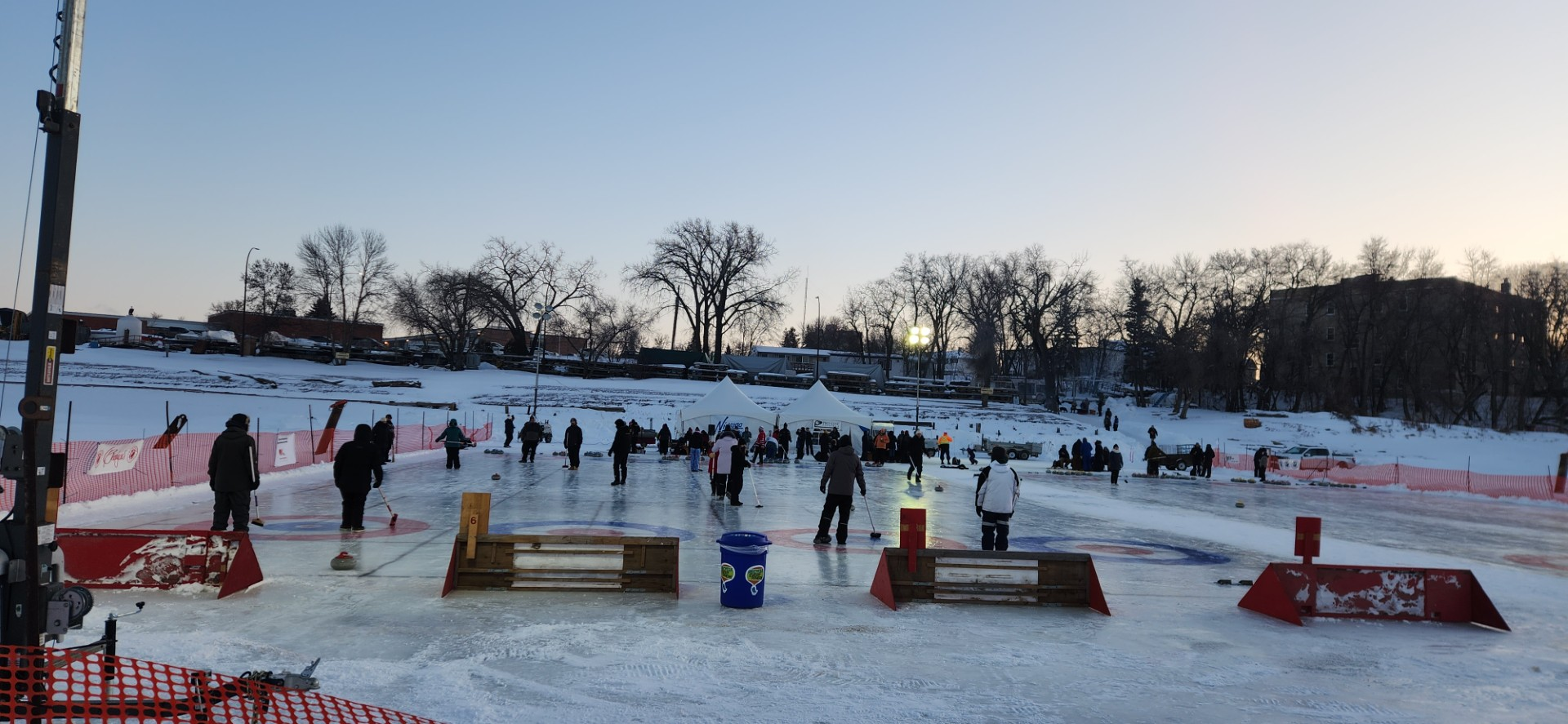
Rock the River Winter Festival Rinks during Friday Night Round 1

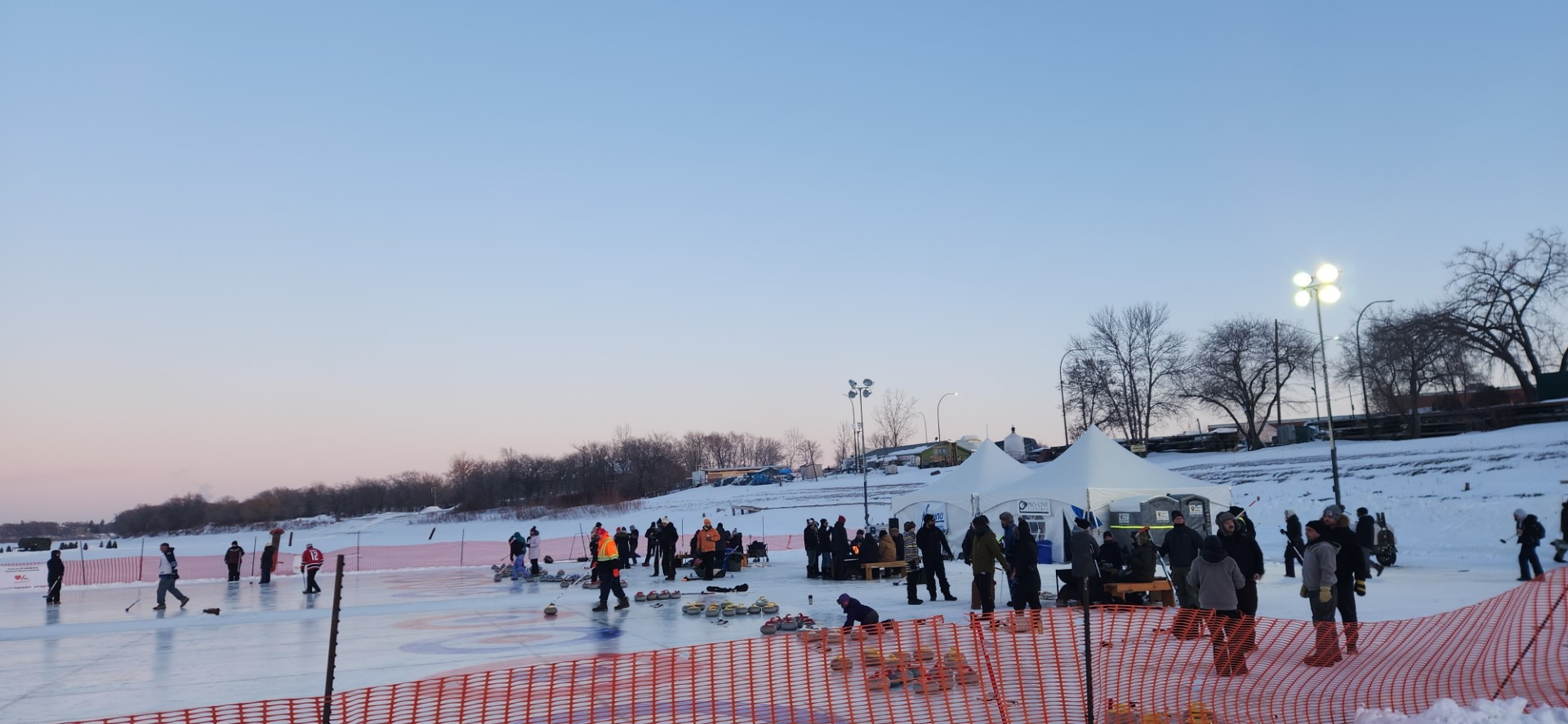
Rock the River Winter Festival set up before games

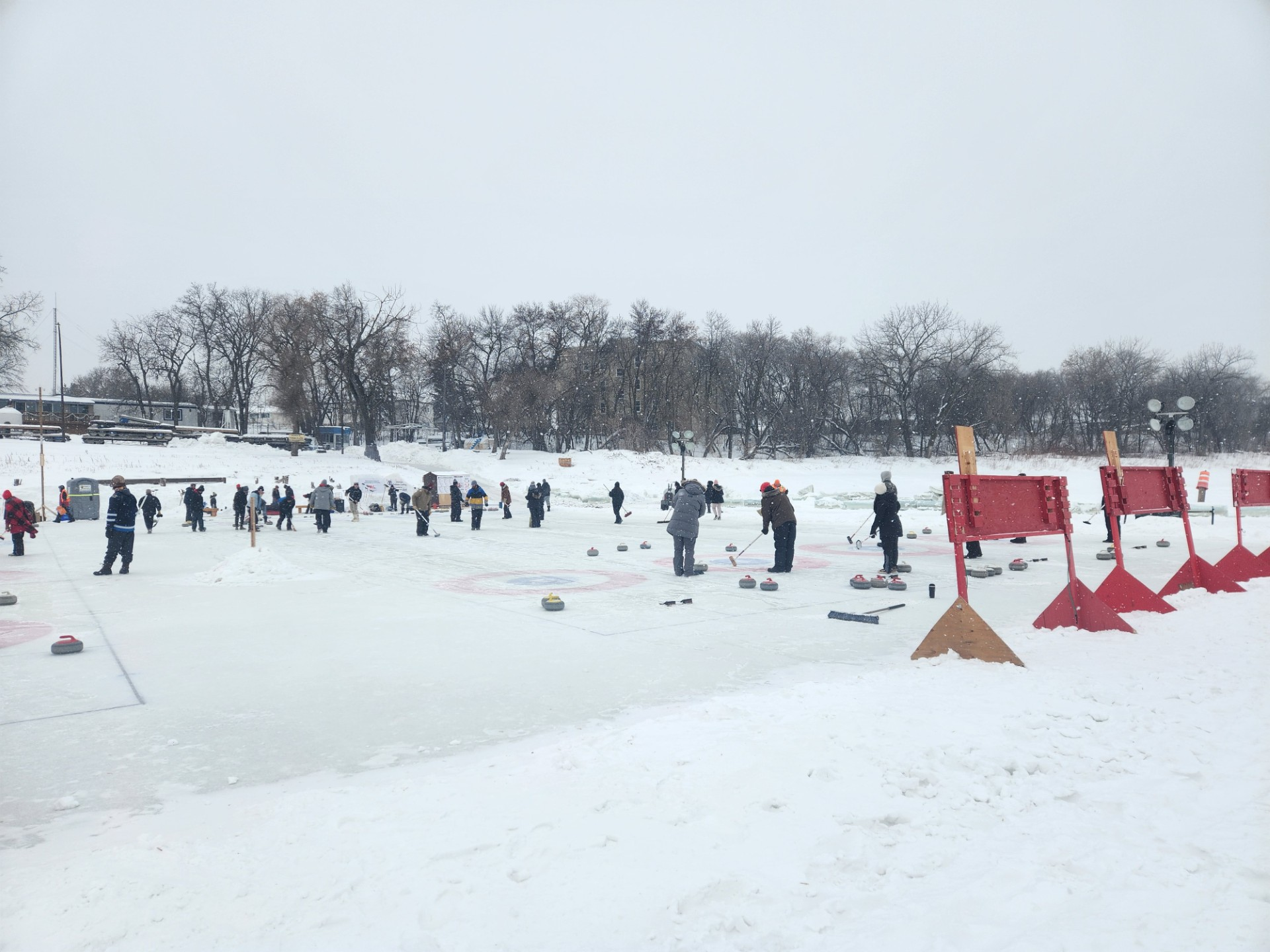
Rock the River Winter Festival in the snow

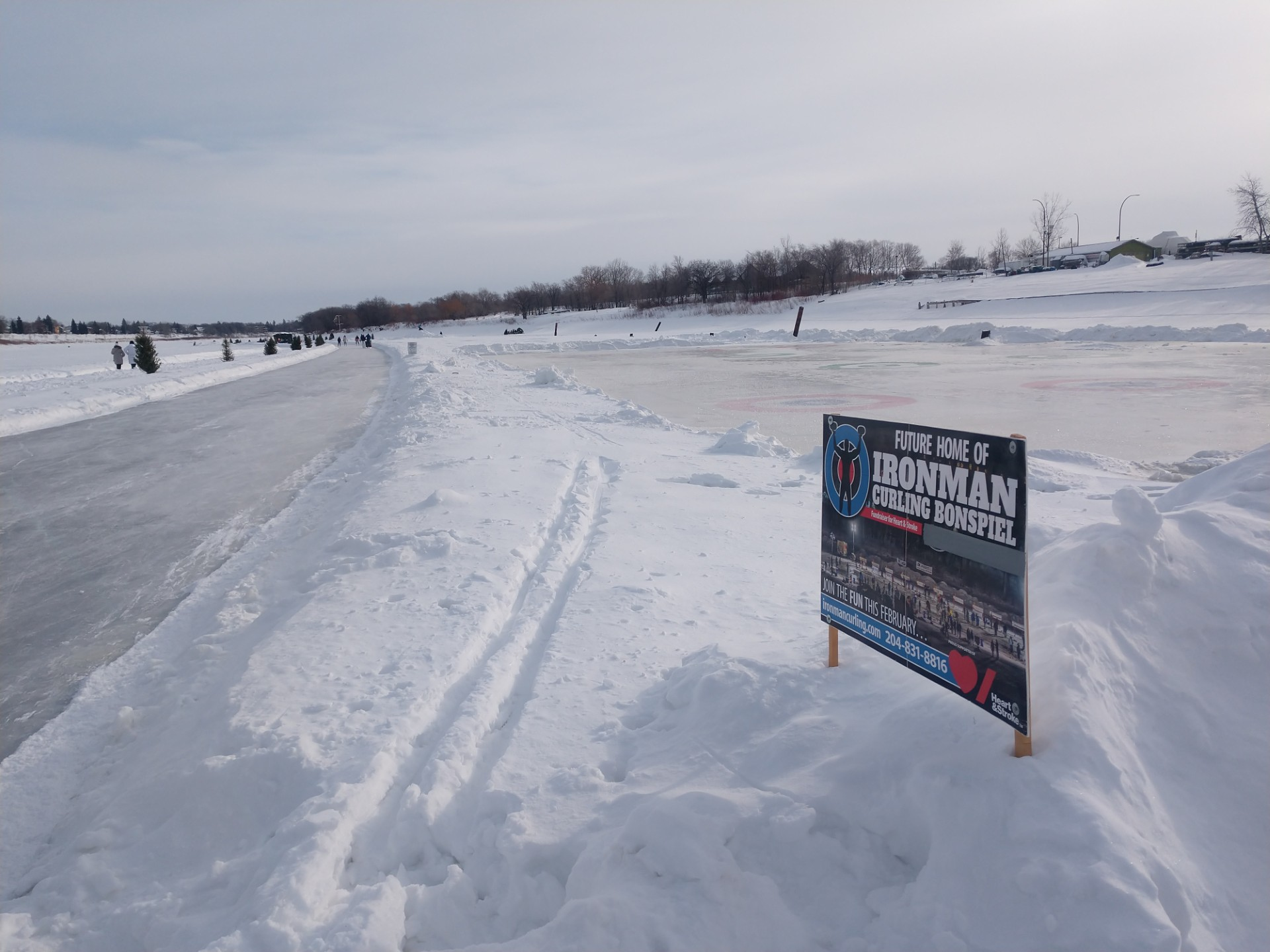
Rock the River Winter Festival location along the Red River skating trail

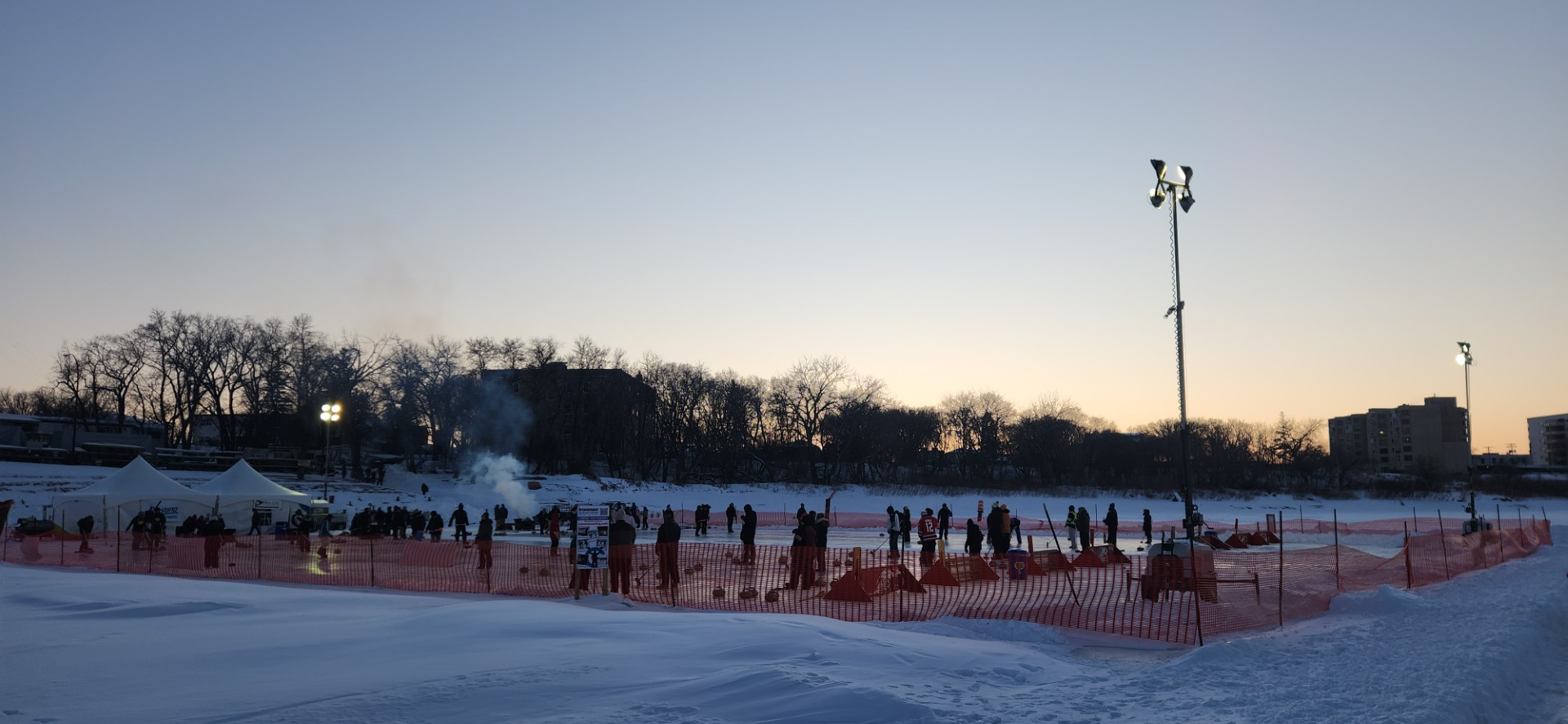
the sun setting behind the Rock the River Winter Festival
