= The Winnipeg Foundation =

Canadian charity foundation

- Formation: 1921
- Headquarters: 1350 – One Lombard Place, Winnipeg, Manitoba
- Key people: George Bass, Chair; Sky Bridges, CEO

The Winnipeg Foundation is a registered charity and community foundation based in Winnipeg, Manitoba, Canada. Established in 1921, it is the oldest community foundation in Canada.

The Foundation is dedicated primarily to the social improvement of Winnipeg. It pools and permanently invests gifts from donors to support the local charitable sector, through grants in a broad range of areas, including; community service, education and employment, health, environment, heritage, arts and culture, and recreation.

In 2024, it received over $541 million in gifts and distributed $91.6 million to approximately 1,100 charitable organizations. The Winnipeg Foundation maintains an endowment fund with assets of approximately $2.4 Billion.

== History ==
The Winnipeg Foundation was founded in 1921 with a gift of $100,000 from local businessman and banker, William Forbes Alloway. Founding board members included Justice Robert Maxwell Dennistoun, Chief Justice Thomas Graham Mathers, Archdeacon R.B. McElheran, and Hugh John MacDonald. In 2001, the Foundation experienced an unprecedented gift when it received a $100 million donation—at the time it was the largest gift ever made to a Canadian community foundation—from Randall Moffat and his family. Moffat is the former president of Moffat Communications.

In 2003, The Winnipeg Foundation made its largest grant to date ($6 million) to the Canadian Museum for Human Rights. In 2012, the Foundation surpassed $300 million in total cumulative grants. In 2014, the Foundation made $22.9 million in grants to 860 charitable organizations. In 2020, it received over $187 million in gifts and distributed $73 million to approximately 1,000 charitable organizations.
