= Tache Avenue, Winnipeg =

Street in St. Boniface, Winnipeg, Canada

Coordinates: 49.8789°N 97.1232°W

Taché Avenue
- Avenue Taché
- Taché Avenue runs north and south; map pin is 1 km from its south end
- Length: 3 km (1.9 mi)
- Location: Saint Boniface, Winnipeg, Manitoba
- North end: Messager St
- Major junctions: Route 57 (Provencher Blvd); Route 115 west (Goulet St); Route 115 east (Marion St); PTH 1 / Route 52 (St. Mary's Rd)
- South end: Lyndale Dr

Taché Avenue (French: Avenue Taché) is a street in the neighbourhood of St. Boniface in Winnipeg, Manitoba, Canada. The road forms a portion of the city's primary diking system to defend against flooding along the Red River.

The street is adjoined by Collège universitaire de Saint-Boniface and Saint Boniface General Hospital. Other nearby landmarks include the Saint Boniface Cathedral, Provencher Bridge, St. Boniface Public Library, St. Boniface Museum, and the Taché Dock. The street is also a connecting route for Winnipeg Route 52 (Main Street) and Winnipeg Route 115 (Marion Street). At the northern tip of Taché Avenue is the historic site of Fort Gibraltar.

The street is named after Alexandre-Antonin Taché, the first Archbishop of St. Boniface.

== Taché Promenade ==
The Taché Promenade (French: Promenade Taché) is a walkway on the banks of the Red River along Taché Avenue from the Provencher Bridge to the Norwood Bridge in St. Boniface. Interpretive plaques along the walkway explain the early development of the St. Boniface area.

Officially opened by Queen Elizabeth II on 6 October 1984, the Promenade was built to allow small personal boats and water taxis to dock. It received its first upgrade between 1987 and 1989.

A further $4-million (later $10 million) expansion of Taché Dock was announced in the 2010s. Completed in June 2019, the project added a 100-metre (330 ft)-long pedestrian walkway and lookout (called the "St. Boniface Belvedere") that arcs over the Red River riverbank. It also connected the paths that run between St. Boniface Hospital and Esplanade Riel.
