= Holy Ghost Parish =

- Parafia Ducha Świętego
- Holy Ghost Parish
- 49.914°N 97.138°W
- Location: Winnipeg
- Address: 341 Selkirk Ave.
- Country: Canada
- Language(s): English, Polish
- Denomination: Roman Catholic
- Website: https://holyghost.ca/

History
- Status: Active
- Founded: 1899
- Founder: Adélard Langevin

Architecture
- Functional status: Parish church
- Years built: 1899-1900, 1986-1987 (rebuilt)
- Groundbreaking: 1899
- Completed: 1900

Specifications
- Capacity: 900
- Height: 70 ft (21 m)

Clergy
- Pastor: Wojciech Stangel

Holy Ghost Parish is a Roman Catholic parish located in the North End neighbourhood of Winnipeg, Canada. The church was established in 1898 by Archbishop of Saint-Boniface Adélard Langevin and two Polish priests, Fathers John and Albert Kulawy of the Oblates of Mary Immaculate, to serve Winnipeg's Polish, German, Slovak community. The original wood frame parish was built in 1899–1900 in a Gothic Revival style, with further additions being added through to 1906. In 1958 a school was added. The original church was demolished in 1986 to make way for the construction of the present complex, which was completed in 1987.
