= Émilius Goulet =

Canadian Roman Catholic archbishop (born 1933)

Émilius Goulet PSS
- Archbishop of St. Boniface
- Saint Boniface Cathedral façade, 2007. Archbishop Goulet's cathedral church. The facade is from the 1906 Cathedral that burned in 1968. The current cathedral can be seen within.

Orders
- Ordination: June 24, 1958
- Consecration: September 13, 2001 by Jean-Claude Turcotte

Personal details
- Born: May 15, 1933 (age 93) St-Isidore de Dorchester, Québec, Canada
- Education: Grand Séminaire de Saint-Boniface, Pontifical Biblical Institute

Emilius Goulet, PSS (May 15, 1933) is a Canadian Roman Catholic prelate, who served as Archbishop of Archdiocese of Saint Boniface in the Province of Manitoba, Canada from 2001 until his retirement in 2009.

== Biography ==
Archbishop Goulet was the youngest of 13 children born in St-Isidore de Dorchester, Québec on May 15, 1933. He studied theology at the Grand Séminaire de Saint-Boniface in Manitoba and was ordained to the priesthood on June 24, 1958, for the Archdiocese of Saint Boniface. In 1960, he was incardinated into the Sulpician Fathers (The Society of Saint Sulpice) and continued his theological studies in Montreal, followed by studies at the Pontifical Biblical Institute and the École biblique et archéologique française in Jerusalem.

Archbishop Goulet was a seminary professor of Scripture in Saint Boniface (1963–1967), Guatemala (1968–1969), Colombia (1970–1977) and Montreal (1978–1984). He was also Rector of the Major Seminary in Manizales, Colombia (1971–1977) and Provincial of the Sulpicians in Montreal from 1982 to 1994. He served for five years as French-language General Secretary of the Canadian Conference of Catholic Bishops (CCCB). He was Rector at the Canadian Pontifical College in Rome when he was appointed Archbishop of Saint Boniface.

He was appointed Archbishop of Archdiocese of Saint Boniface by Pope John Paul II on June 23, 2001 and was consecrated in the Cathedral Basilica of St. Boniface (in the St. Boniface District of Winnipeg), Manitoba on September 13, 2001 by Cardinal Jean-Claude Turcotte, Archbishop of Montreal; Archbishop Maurice Couture, R.S.V.(Religieux de Saint Vincent de Paul), Archbishop of Quebec (City); and Archbishop James Vernon Weisgerber, Archbishop of Winnipeg.

Archbishop Goulet's resignation was accepted by Pope Benedict XVI in July 2009 and he was replaced by Albert LeGatt.
