= Laïssa Armelle Pamou =

Cameroonian journalist, television presenter and author

- Born: 19 November 1994 (age 31); Douala
- Occupations: Journalist, Writer, Television presenter

Laïssa Armelle Pamou (born 19 November 1994) is a Cameroonian media personality, journalist, host and author. She joined the CBC/Radio-Canada team in Manitoba in 2017 and holds a management position there.

== Biography ==
=== Early life and education ===
Pamou was born in Douala. She holds a bachelor's degree in business administration from the University of Saint-Boniface, graduating with honors, at the top of her class. This academic training likely influenced her professional career in the field of media and communication. In addition to her university studies, she was also involved in various activities at the University of Saint Boniface, serving as a student, resident, and employee, which allowed her to develop a deeper understanding of the institution and its community.

=== Career ===
She is involved in content creation and presentation at Radio-Canada, in the province of Manitoba. She is an integral part of the Telejournal-Manitoba team, a news program that covers provincial, national, and international topics, as well as cultural and sporting events.

Through her work presenting and hosting TV shows, she's played a key role in spreading cultural, social, and political knowledge across Canada.

Pamou has also been involved in film projects, notably as a co-screenwriter for the documentary Restoration: a Refugee's Story, which won an award for excellence at the Hollywood International Independent Documentary Awards.

== Publications ==
In addition to her media career, Pamou is an accomplished author. She has published a novel titled Madiba, and a collection of poems called Les Maux au cœur d'un cahier intime. Furthermore, she annually produces a magazine titled La Littérature au service de l'éveil des consciences, aimed at educating and developing the personal growth of young people.
