= St. Boniface Hospital =

Hospital in Manitoba, Canada

St. Boniface Hospital Hôpital Saint-Boniface
- Winnipeg Regional Health Authority
- Main entrance of St. Boniface Hospital

Geography
- Location: 409 Taché Avenue, St. Boniface,(Winnipeg), Manitoba R2H 2A6, Canada
- Coordinates: 49°53′4″N 97°7′30″W

Organization
- Care system: Public Medicare (Canada)
- Type: General, Teaching, Research
- Affiliated university: University of Manitoba
- Patron: D15 D16 888 110

Services
- Emergency department: Yes
- Beds: 440 (30 nursing bassinets)

History
- Founded: 1871

Links
- Website: www.sbgh.mb.ca
- Lists: Hospitals in Canada

St. Boniface Hospital (French: Hôpital Saint-Boniface; also called St. B; previously called the Saint-Boniface General Hospital) is Manitoba's second-largest hospital, located in the St. Boniface neighbourhood of Winnipeg. Founded by the Sisters of Charity (Grey Nuns) of Montreal in 1871, it was the first hospital in Western Canada. The hospital was incorporated in 1960, and as of 2023 has 440 beds and 30 bassinets.

St. Boniface Hospital is a tertiary health care facility, employing nearly 3,500 staff and 340 doctors with admitting privileges. The St. Boniface Hospital & Research Foundation is the primary fundraising organization for the hospital. St. Boniface is a regional centre for cardiac care. It also provides diagnostic imaging and hemodialysis for the Winnipeg Regional Health Authority.

Besides patient care, St. Boniface Hospital also carries out medical research and offers practicum positions for university students through its affiliation with the University of Manitoba. The hospital's primary research mandate is in cardiovascular studies, imaging (especially MRI), neurodegenerative disorders, and nutraceuticals. The hospital also participates in clinical trials of research discoveries.

== Location ==
St. Boniface Hospital is located near the Red and Assiniboine Rivers in the St. Boniface neighbourhood of Winnipeg, which is home to a large proportion of Manitoba's Francophone population. It lies across the river from downtown and The Forks. The hospital has a parking structure and three parking lots. It also has an ambulance bay.

== History ==
The original hospital building, c. 1871

St. Boniface Hospital was established by the Grey Nuns in 1871, the first hospital west of Quebec. At that time, it was a small facility with four beds. An operating room was added in 1894. The Grey Nuns opened a school of nursing in 1897 and used the hospital to teach patient care. By the early 1900s, the hospital was treating approximately 2,500 patients per year. An isolation hospital and nurse's residence was added in 1900. Due to overcrowding, a new addition was built in 1905, effectively doubling the patient capacity of the hospital. It was awarded provisional approval by the American College of Surgeons (ACS) in 1944, later becoming the office of the Manitoba Chapter of the ACS. As of 2003, the hospital has 554 beds and 78 bassinets.

The hospital order was incorporated in 1960 under the name St. Boniface General Hospital, giving it the right to invest and borrow money, own property, and collect fees for services. St. Boniface Hospital, along with the Royal Victoria Hospital, Montreal, opened the first hospice programs in Canada in 1975. The Hospital Research Centre opened in 1987, becoming the first Canadian free-standing medical research facility. During the 1997 Red River flood, the hospital had to be evacuated, and has since created a disaster plan to cope any future evacuations or closures.

== Funding ==
Basic medical care is a benefit provided to all Canadians through Canada's publicly funded health system. However, significant additional funding is required for medical research, improvements in patient services, and the clinical programs found at St. Boniface Hospital. The hospital had a Can$7.5 million deficit as of March 2024. The St. Boniface Hospital & Research Foundation, founded in 1971, is the primary fundraising organization for St. Boniface Hospital and the Research Centre. In 2024, the Foundation provided Can$8.2 million.

== Research ==
The St. Boniface Hospital Research Centre is the hospital's main research facility. It includes the G. Campbell MacLean Building, the Dr. Andrei Sakharov MRI Centre, and the I. H. Asper Clinical Research Institute, which are operated with research grants, industry contracts, fundraising, and funding from the University of Manitoba. The centre opened in 1987. Its primary research mandate addresses three main areas: cardiovascular sciences, nutraceuticals and functional foods, and degenerative disorders associated with aging. In addition, the Centre undertakes research in magnetic resonance imaging, anesthesia, epidemiology, family medicine, infectious diseases, nephrology, nursing, nutraceuticals, pharmaceuticals, sleep disorders, and surgery.

=== Institute of Cardiovascular Sciences ===
St. Boniface Hospital's Institute of Cardiovascular Sciences researches heart disease at the cellular and molecular levels. It also hosts the Canadian Journal of Physiology and Pharmacology, the journal Molecular and Cellular Biochemistry, the International Academy of Cardiovascular Sciences, and its journal Experimental & Clinical Cardiology. The Institute was created as the Division of Cardiovascular Sciences in 1987 by Dr. Naranjan Dhalla. Its researchers have been published in such academic journals as the New England Journal of Medicine and Cardiovascular Research.

=== Division of Neurodegenerative Disorders ===
The Division of Neurodegenerative Disorders (DND) was established in 1999. The DND is a neurodegenerative research team working to identify causes and treatments for disorders like Alzheimer's, strokes, traumatic brain injury, and central nervous system degeneration, to study the effect of diabetes on neurodegeneration, and to conduct sleep studies.

=== Canadian Centre for Agri-Food Research in Health and Medicine ===
The Canadian Centre for Agri-food Research in Health and Medicine (CCARM) investigates nutraceuticals and health food in partnership with Agriculture and Agri-food Canada. CCARM’s mandate is to research natural health products and give the results to the scientific community and the general public. The results of their research have been published in numerous academic journals, including the European Journal of Clinical Nutrition and the Journal of Biological Chemistry.

=== MRI centre ===
The Dr. Andrei Sakharov Magnetic Resonance Imaging (MRI) Facility has three MRI scanners. The facility allows radiologists to diagnose abnormalities of the brain, spinal cord, internal organs and joints. St. Boniface Hospital Research Centre is a recognized leader in the MRI field and has one of the largest MRI research facilities in Canada. An MRI was first installed at St. Boniface in 1990; this MRI was eventually replaced by a more modern version, which is primarily used for clinical purposes. The other two MRIs are research-oriented: they are an interventional scanner and a head-only functional unit. The clinical scanner enables the Centre to do echo-planar imaging, producing images at video rates; the interventional MRI gives physicians access to the patient during imaging, which supports research into robotics-guided laser surgery. Research carried out at the centre has been published in the Journal of Magnetic Resonance Imaging.

=== Clinical research ===
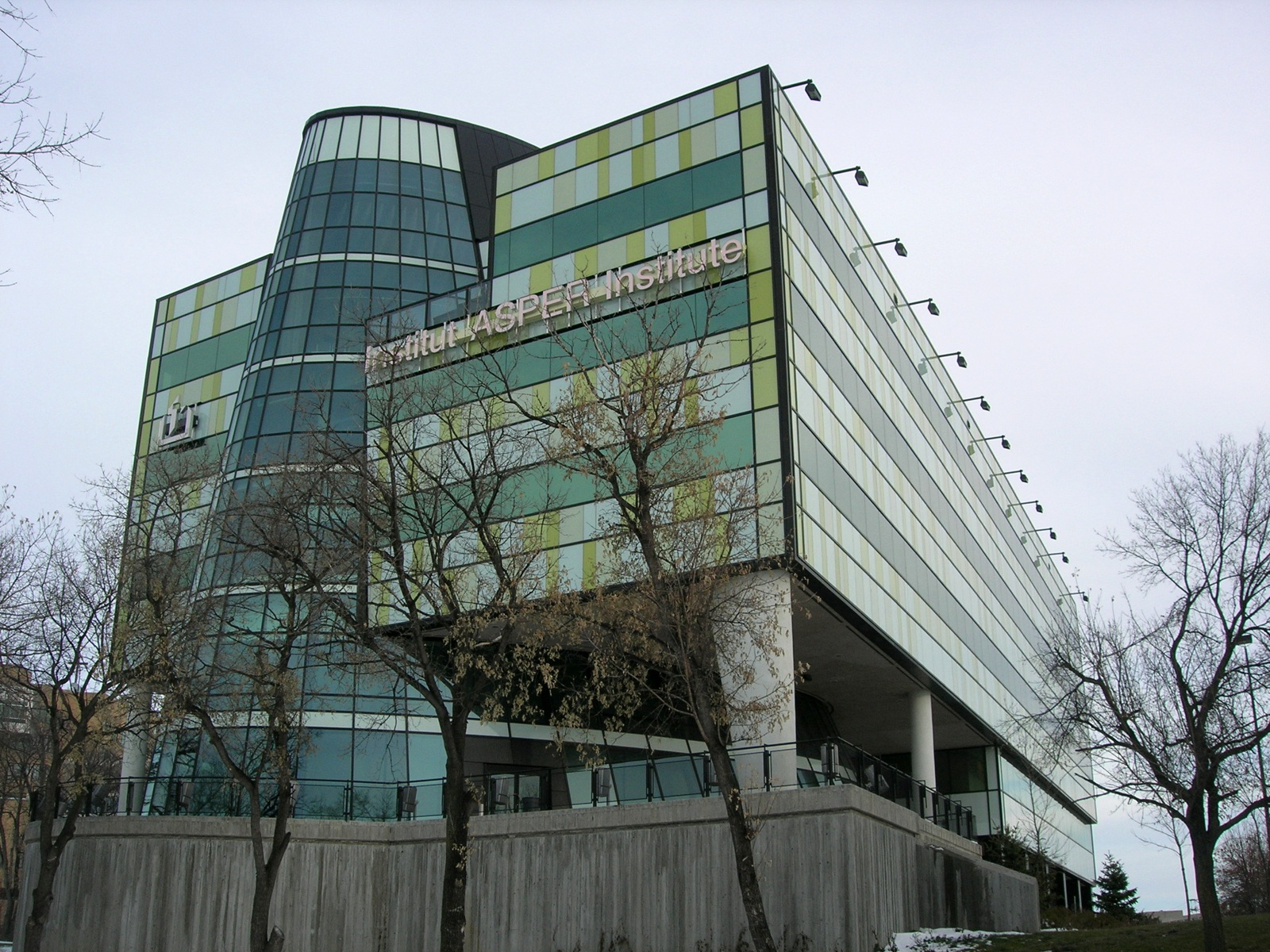
I. H. Asper Clinical Research Institute

The I. H. Asper Clinical Research Institute facilitates clinical trials of the discoveries made at the Research Centre. The Institute is the third research facility in Canada to conduct tests on new drugs and medical devices. The I. H. Asper Clinical Research Institute was opened in 2004.

== Education ==
St. Boniface Hospital is affiliated with the University of Manitoba's education and research branches, providing internship and practicum positions for students. The hospital works with multiple University of Manitoba faculties, including medicine, nursing, pharmacy, social work, respiratory therapy, physiotherapy and occupational therapy, as well as with Red River College and Collège universitaire de Saint-Boniface. St. Boniface Hospital also hosts the Winnipeg Critical Care Nursing Education Program.

== Services ==
St. Boniface is one of Manitoba's two tertiary care centres. Patients are referred to the hospital by their doctors or clinics for specialized care, though most are admitted through the emergency department. The Medicine Program is the adult general admissions program. Services include: internal medicine, endocrinology, rheumatology, respiratory medicine, gastroenterology, hematology, oncology, pathology and neurology. The outreach program also includes at-home intravenous therapy and nutrition. The hospital has 14 operating rooms; there is also a surgical intensive care unit available for recovery. The surgical department treats over 13,000 patients per year.

=== Emergency Department ===
St. Boniface's emergency department provides acute care for an average of over 100 patients per day, and is the second busiest emergency department in Winnipeg. The emergency room had the third longest wait times in Canada as of 2016. Expansion of the emergency department began in the summer of 2022, with the first phase opening in October 2025.

=== Family Medicine Program ===
The Family Medicine Program is designed to encourage disease prevention and health maintenance. It also includes a palliative care unit, the first nationally accredited palliative residency program in Canada. The Rehabilitation Program provides inpatient and outpatient physiotherapy. The Mental Health program provides psychological and counselling services to adult and adolescent patients. It also maintains an inpatient program, and provides stress counselling to hospital staff.

=== Cardiac Sciences Program ===
The Cardiac Sciences Program (including the departments of Cardiac Surgery, Cardiology, Cardiac Anesthesiology and Critical Care) is an integrated heart health unit designed to treat cardiac problems. The Bergen Cardiac Care Centre provides access to tertiary cardiology care and hosts cardiac operations and diagnostics, the only hospital in Manitoba to offer certain specialized services. It includes three cardiac angiography rooms, one pacemaker and cardiac defibrillator room, one room for procedures in electrophysiology, 17 recovery beds, cardiology clinics, echocardiography rooms, and office space.

=== Diagnostic imaging ===
St. Boniface is part of the Winnipeg Regional Health Authority's diagnostic imaging program. It provides: angiography, bone density imaging, CT scans, MRIs, mammography, nuclear medicine tests, ultrasounds and X-rays. St. Boniface was the home of Manitoba's first MRI scanner, and is one of the largest diagnostic MRI facilities in Western Canada.

=== Laboratories ===
The laboratories at the St. Boniface Hospital operate under the Winnipeg Regional Health Authority's Laboratory Medicine Program; St. Boniface is one of the two main referral sites in the WRHA for specialty tests. They run tests in biochemistry, hematology, immunology, microbiology, cytology and pathology for patients and doctors in Manitoba. They also provide some specialized testing facilities for educational institutions.

=== Manitoba Renal Program ===
St. Boniface Hospital provides acute and chronic hemodialysis as part of the Manitoba Renal Program. It also has a renal health clinic to assess patients with kidney problems.

=== Obstetrics, Gynecology & Neonatology ===
The Obstetrics, Gynecology & Neonatology provides gynecological and obstetrical services, outpatient pediatric care and women's services. Over 4,200 births per year occur at St. Boniface Hospital. The Labour and Delivery department includes services for high-risk deliveries. The Neonatal Intensive Care Unit (NICU) cares for 750 premature or ill infants per year.

== Assessment ==
Unlike the United Kingdom and the United States, Canada does not publish national ratings of individual hospitals. As of 2008, St. Boniface reports 80% patient satisfaction with its services, according to internal inpatient surveys. Mortality rates for inpatients stand at around 2.4%.

As of June 2025, the hospital had the longest emergency room length of stay in the province, at 10.5 hours. Wait times for diagnostic services included 17 weeks for an MRI, 16 weeks for CT/CAT scans, 11 weeks for ultrasounds, 17 weeks for bone density scans, and 14 weeks for myocardial perfusion studies, as of August 2025. As of Augusts 2025, wait times for cardiac surgery were 13 days.

== See also ==
- List of hospitals in Canada
- Health Sciences Centre (Winnipeg)
