= Norbert Provencher =

Canadian clergyman and missionary (1787–1853)

Joseph-Norbert Provencher
- Bishop of Saint-Boniface, Manitoba
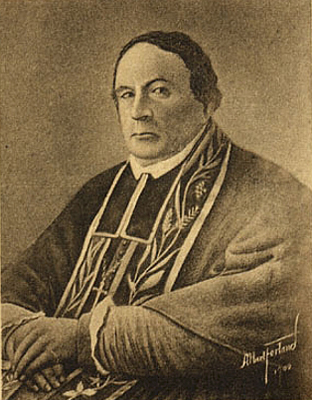
- Archdiocese: Saint Boniface
- Installed: June 4, 1847
- Term ended: June 7, 1853
- Predecessor: None
- Successor: Alexander-Antonine Taché
- Other posts: Coadjutor Bishop of Quebec City; Vicar Apostolic of North-West (Nord-Ouest)

Orders
- Ordination: December 21, 1811

Personal details
- Born: February 12, 1787 Nicolet, Province of Quebec
- Died: June 7, 1853 (aged 66) Saint Boniface, Rupert's Land

Joseph-Norbert Provencher (February 12, 1787 – June 7, 1853) was a Canadian clergyman and missionary and one of the founders of the modern province of Manitoba. He was the first Bishop of Saint Boniface and was an important figure in the history of the Franco-Manitoban community.

== Life ==
Provencher was born in Nicolet, Quebec, in 1787 to Jean-Baptiste and Élisabeth Proulx Provencher. His parents were farmers. Provencher was educated at the Nicolet College Classique and the Quebec Seminary. He was ordained a priest in 1811. For several years he served as curate in various parishes. In 1818 he and two other priests were sent by Joseph-Octave Plessis, Bishop of Quebec, to open a mission on the Red River in present-day Manitoba, where the majority of settlers were Irish and Scottish Catholics. He was tasked with converting the scattered Indian nations and to care for the "delinquent Christians, who have adopted there the customs of the Indians." At the time, Provencher did not speak English.

They arrived at Fort Douglas in mid-July. Thomas Douglas, 5th Earl of Selkirk, a main share-holder in the Hudson's Bay Company gave the missionaries land on the east bank of the Red River. They immediately set to work to build a house before winter. Part of the building served as a chapel, which Provencher dedicated to famous missionary, Saint Boniface. The mission at Saint Boniface was highly successful; he baptized many of the local First Nations and Métis residents as well as many European settlers. In 1819, Provencher was appointed Auxiliary Bishop of Quebec with the titular title of Bishop of Juliopolis, and vicar general for the northwest. He was consecrated at Trois-Rivières in 1822.

He returned to St. Boniface and built the school that is now known as the Université de Saint-Boniface and in 1832 Saint-Boniface Cathedral. In 1838, he founded a school to teach the weaving of wool provided by sheep brought into the colony. The Canadian settlers resisted his efforts to regularize concubinage with Indian and Metis women and preferred "this liberty of being able to get rid of their wives."

In 1844, Provencher was appointed head of the newly-formed Vicariate Apostolic of James Bay, which was elevated to the Diocese of Northwest in 1847, and he was appointed its first bishop. It was renamed the Diocese of Saint Boniface in 1851.

In 1843, Provencher went to Europe to recruit some religious men and women. In 1846, despite the misgivings of the superior in Canada, Eugène de Mazenod, Bishop of Marseille and founder of the Missionary Oblates of Mary Immaculate dispatched two priests to the vicariate. In 1850, Alexandre-Antonin Taché O.M.I. was named coadjutor bishop to Bishop Provencher. He established Indian missions at Lac Sainte-Anne not far from Fort Edmonton, and Saint-Jean Baptiste in Île-à-la-Crosse. He brought the Grey Nuns to the Canadian Northwest. In 1860 three Grey Nuns arrived Saint-Jean Baptiste, and founded a school and a hospital.

Provencher stood six feet four inches, and had a noble bearing. He is described as "moral, humble, tenacious, and devout."

Bishop Provencher died at Saint Boniface, Manitoba, on June 7, 1853, at the age of 66. He is commemorated by Provencher Boulevard in Winnipeg and the Provencher Monument in the St. Boniface Cathedral Cemetery. His papers are in the Archives of the Archdiocese of Quebec and in the Archives of Manitoba.

== See also ==
- Jean-Baptiste Thibault
- Louis-François Richer Laflèche

== Sources ==
- "Norbert Provencher". Dictionary of Canadian Biography (online ed.). University of Toronto Press. 1979–2016.
- Manitoba Historical Society article
- Catholic Hierarchy article
