= Université de Saint-Boniface =

University in Winnipeg, Manitoba, Canada

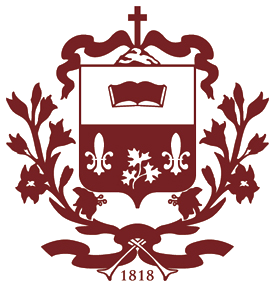
- Former names: Collège de Saint-Boniface; Collège universitaire de Saint-Boniface
- Type: Private public-interest corporation
- Established: 1818; 208 years ago
- Founder: Norbert Provencher
- Affiliations: University of Manitoba; ACUFC; CICan; UnivCan
- Religious affiliation: Roman Catholic
- Chairperson: Lise Pinkos
- President: Sophie Bouffard
- Students: 1,333
- Undergraduates: 1,226
- Postgraduates: 107
- Location: Winnipeg, Manitoba, Canada; 49.888631°N 97.119725°W
- Campus: Urban
- Website: ustboniface.ca

The Université de Saint-Boniface (USB) is a French-language public university located in the St. Boniface neighbourhood of Winnipeg, Manitoba, Canada. An affiliated institution of the University of Manitoba, the university offers general and specialized university degree programs as well as technical and professional training. In 2014, 1,368 regular students were enrolled. Its Continuing Education Division, which includes a language school, has also counted over 4,200 enrolments.

== History ==
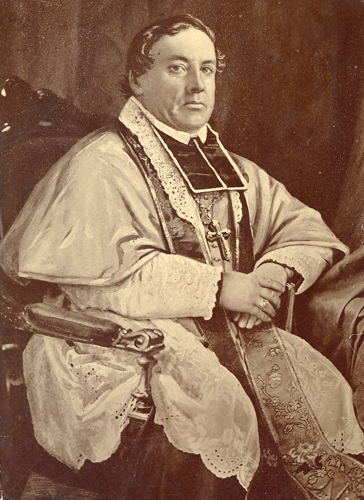
Joseph-Norbert Provencher, Collège founder

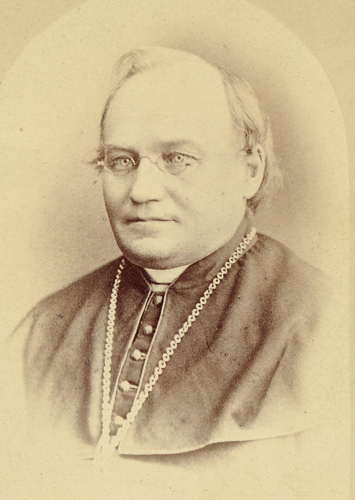
Bishop Alexandre-Antonin Taché (President 1854–1860)

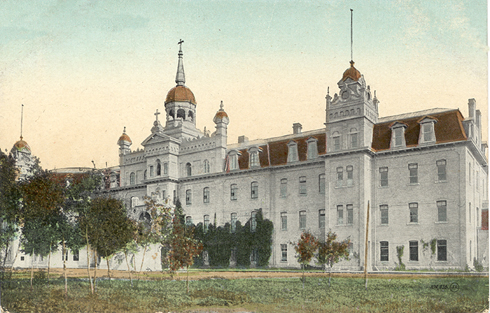
Collège, prior to the 1922 fire

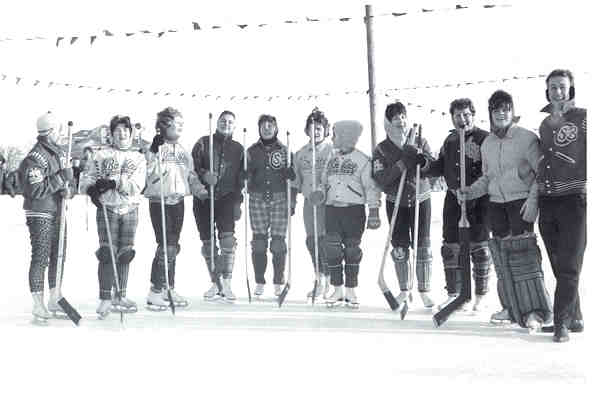
Students playing hockey, c. 1962

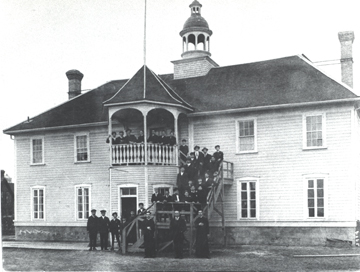
The first permanent structure, built in 1855

Université de Saint-Boniface was established by Father Norbert Provencher (1787–1853) in 1818, making it western Canada's oldest post-secondary educational institution. It began as a small school where Latin was taught to the boys of the French-speaking Red River Colony.

In 1855, Collège de Saint-Boniface was constructed on the corner of Taché Avenue and Masson Street; this was overseen by Bishop Alexandre-Antonin Taché (1823–1894). From 1866 to 1870, under the guidance of Bishop George Dugas, Collège changed its programs to incorporate the instruction of Latin, Greek, and philosophy into a classical curriculum.

Incorporated in 1871, Collège was one of the earliest official institutions of the new province of Manitoba, which had joined the Canadian Confederation the year before. In 1877, together with the Anglican St. John's College and the Presbyterian Manitoba College, it helped establish the University of Manitoba. Collège served both francophone and anglophone Catholic students. Around the same time, Manitoba saw an influx of French-speaking newcomers from Quebec, France, Switzerland and Belgium. In 1880, increased enrolment led to the construction of a larger building on the site of what is now Provencher Park. Annual enrolment was around 300 students at that time.

In 1890, French lost official language status in Manitoba, and in 1916, the Thornton Act prohibited French-language instruction in the province's public schools. As a private institution, Collège remained in operation and encouraged public schools to oppose the government ban. French-language teaching continued in secret.

On November 25, 1922, a fire started in a music room in the basement and the blaze destroyed the building, including all of its records and the 40,000-volume library; claiming ten victims. In response to this, Msgr. Arthur Béliveau, Archbishop of St. Boniface, donated the seminary (Le Petit Séminaire) on Avenue de la Cathédrale, the present location of USB. English-speaking Jesuits also founded their own college (St. Paul's College) in 1925, and USB became a francophone institution. However, Collège offered business courses in English until 1941.

The 1960s were marked by three major changes: the arrival of women in the classroom (1959), the beginnings of continuing education (including French and French as a second language classes, which sparked controversy), and the institution's transition to secular administration (1969).

In 1975, Collège began to offer technical and professional programs, which led to the creation of the École technique et professionnelle (ETP) in 1989. In 1983, high school classes were transferred to Collège Louis-Riel and Collège began to focus solely on post-secondary education.

The institution officially became the Université de Saint-Boniface in September 2011 after the passage of the Université de Saint-Boniface Act.

Despite its new status as a university, USB continues to be affiliated with the University of Manitoba, which it helped establish in 1877. Enshrined in the Université de Saint-Boniface Act, the university remained affiliated with the University of Manitoba, and USB was committed to preserving this 135-year-old relationship. University degrees continue to be conferred by the University of Manitoba. However, graduates of the technical and professional programs of the ETP or École des sciences infirmières et des études de la santé (ESIES) receive their diploma or certificate from Université de Saint-Boniface.

Although a hub of French-language education and of Manitoba's francophone community, USB still accepts students from around the world.

== Campus ==
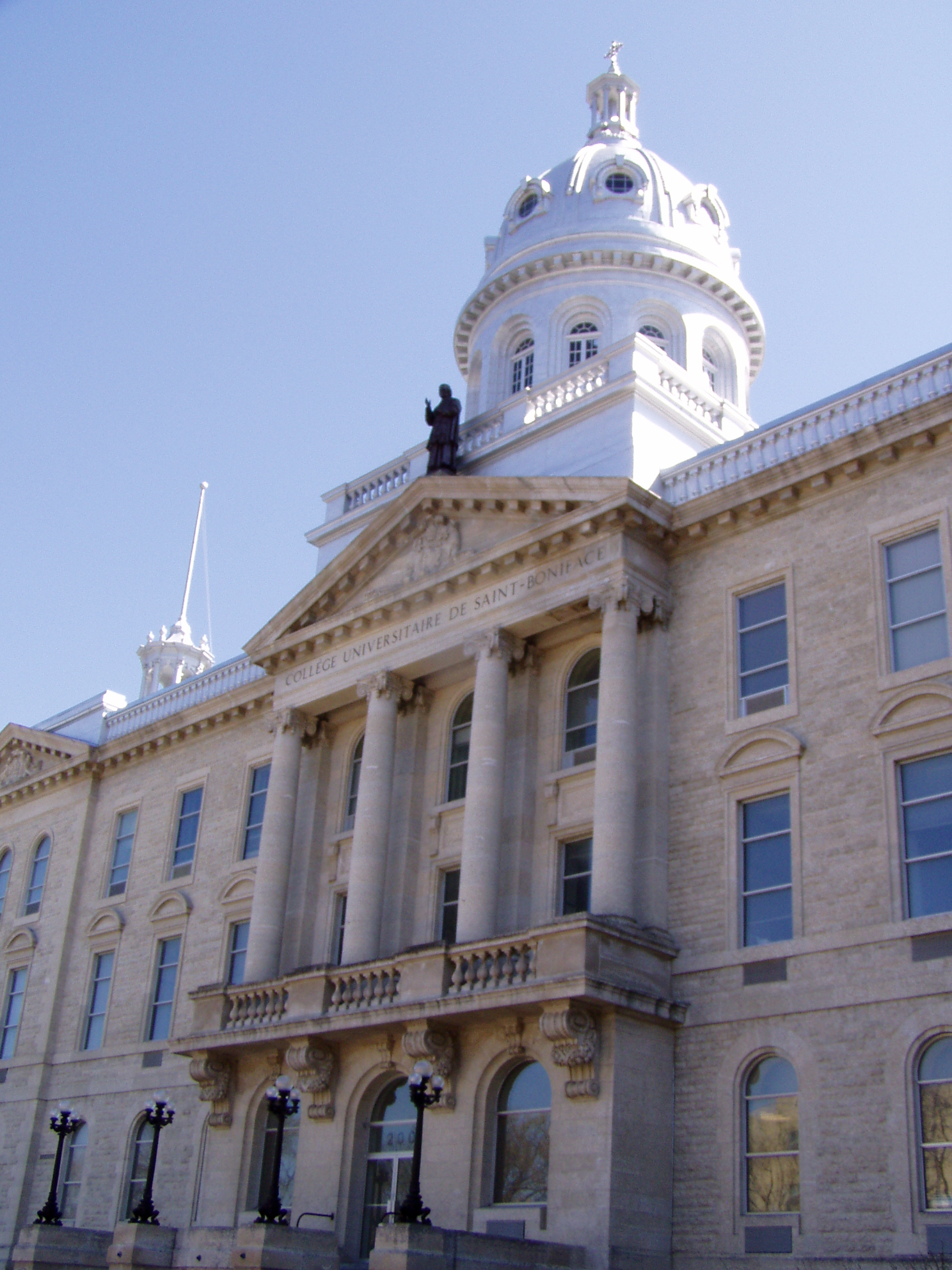
Université de Saint-Boniface

It is located on 200 Avenue de la Cathedrale, which is central to the St. Boniface neighbourhood. It is also close to the St. Boniface Hospital, the St. Boniface Cathedral, and the Red River. The Esplanade Riel leads from the Université to Winnipeg's downtown.

The main USB building, built with Tyndall stone, houses two gymnasiums, the Sportex fitness centre, a library, a chapel, the Étienne Gaboury student centre, the campus radio station, an amphitheatre, computer facilities, a performance hall and an art gallery.

The new Pavillon Marcel-A.-Desautels health sciences building opened in 2011.

=== Student residence ===
The student residence, located at 474 and 480 Aulneau Street in Winnipeg, was acquired in 2005 from the Missionary Oblates of Mary Immaculate. In 2014, the building was officially named Résidence-Père-Théophile-Lavoie-O.M.I.

=== Fitness centre ===
Sportex, the university's fitness centre, first opened in 1988, offering sport programmes for students, university staff, and the general public.

== Programs ==
Université de Saint-Boniface offers both university and technical and professional programs as well as continuing education courses.

=== University and college programs ===
FACULTY/SCHOOL	DEGREE/CERTIFICATE
Faculty of Arts	Bachelor of Arts (General); Bachelor of Arts (Honours) – French; Bachelor of Arts (Advanced Major) – French; Bachelor of Arts (Advanced Majors) – History and Intercultural Leadership; Bachelor of Arts (Advanced Majors) – History and International Studies; Master of Arts in Canadian and Intercultural Studies
School of Translation	Bachelor of Arts (Honours) – Translation; Bachelor of Arts (Honours) – Translation (online program); Bachelor of Arts (Joint Major) – French and Translation; Certificate in Translation; Certificate in Translation (online program)
School of Business Administration	Bachelor of Business Administration
Faculty of Science	Bachelor of Science (General); Bachelor of Science (Major in Biochemistry-Microbiology); Bachelor of Science (Major in Biochemistry-Microbiology), coop program
School of Nursing Sciences and Health Studies (ESIES)	Health Aid Certificate; Diploma of Nursing Sciences; Bachelor of Nursing Sciences
School of Social Work	Bachelor of Social Work
Technical and Professional School (ETP)	Information Technology Diploma; Multimedia Communications Diploma; Business Administration Diploma; Tourism Management Diploma; Early Childhood Education Diploma; Advanced Diploma in Health and Community Services Management
Faculty of Education after obtaining a first degree	Bachelor of Education – Early and Middle Years; Bachelor of Education – Senior Years; Post-Baccalaureate Diploma in Education; Post-Baccalaureate Diploma in Education specialized in Inclusive Education; Master of Education – Counselling; Master of Education – Inclusive Education; Master of Education – School Administration*; Master of Education – Language, Literacy and Curriculum

=== Continuing education ===
Université de Saint-Boniface's Continuing Education Division has courses in several areas. Its Language School (École de langues) has French and Spanish courses, and produces instructional material for teaching French as a first or additional language. The Continuing Education Division has an annual enrolment of over 4,000 students.

== Research ==
The research conducted at Université de Saint-Boniface is internationally recognised and focuses on areas related to the university, such as health and Francophone and Métis identity.

Founded in 1985, USB's Research Centre houses the Centre d’études Franco-canadiennes de l’Ouest (CEFCO), Presses universitaires de Saint-Boniface (PUSB), and the Canadian Research Chair on Migrations, Transfers and Francophone Communities (CRC-MTCF). In the past it has also held the Canada Research Chair on Métis Identity (CRCMI) chaired by Dr. Denis Gagnon from 2004 to 2014, and the Community-University Research Alliance on Francophone Identities in Western Canada (ARUC-IFO) chaired by Dr. Len Rivard from 2007 to 2013.

== Scholarships and bursaries ==
The Canadian government sponsors an Aboriginal Bursaries Search Tool that lists more than 680 scholarships, bursaries, and other incentives offered by governments, universities, and industry to support Aboriginal post-secondary participation. Université de Saint-Boniface scholarships for Aboriginal, First Nations and Métis students include: Louis Riel Scholarships; Louis Riel Institute Bursaries.

== Administration ==
The purposes and powers of Université de Saint-Boniface are set out in the Université de Saint-Boniface Act, the most recent version of which is dated June 2011. Its bilateral governance structure consists of the Board of Governors and the Senate. A number of ad hoc committees are also in place.

=== USB President ===
Originally from Lévis, a suburb of Quebec City, Sophie Bouffard obtained a doctorate in musicology (2011) from the University of Regina and a masters in music (2000) from Université Laval. Soprano opera singer by profession, she has given a number of performances in Canada and abroad. Specialist in the creation of new music, many works have been composed for her. Mrs. Bouffard is the second female president in USB history and is the 45th person to hold the position. She has been the USB president since August 2019.

=== Past presidents ===
- Msgr. Norbert Provencher (1818–1853)
- Msgr. Alexandre-A. Taché (1854–1860)
- R.P. Jean-Marie Le Floch, omi (1860–1862)
- R.P. Joseph Lestanc, omi (1862–1865)
- R.P. Valentin Végreville, omi (1865–1866)
- R.P. Georges Dugas (1866–1869)
- R.P. Louis-R. Giroux (1869–1870)
- R.P. Théophile Lavoie, omi (1870–1878)
- R.P. A.-A. Forget-Despatis (1878–1881)
- R.P. A.A. Cherrier (1881–1884)
- R.P. François-A. Dugas (1884–1885)
- R.P. Hippolyte Lory, s.j. (1885–1890)
- R.P. Xavier Renaud, s.j. (1890–1891)
- R.P. Henri Hudon, s.j. (1891–1894)
- R.P. Rémi Chartier, s.j. (1894–1898)
- R.P. Julien Paquin. s.j. (1898–1900)
- R.P. Hyacinthe Hudon, s.j. (1990–1903)
- R.P. Jacques Dugas, s.j. (1903–1908)
- R.P. Télesphore Filiatrault, s.j. (1908–1910)
- R.P. Joseph Carrière, s.j. (1910–1911)
- R.P. Gustave Jean, s.j. (1911–1912)
- R.P. Edouard Lecompte, s.j. (1912–1914)
- R.P. Alexandre Gagnieur, s.j. (1914–1915)
- R.P. Grégoire Féré, s.j. (1915–1919)
- R.P. Henri Bourque, s.j. (1919–1924)
- R.P. Joseph Desjardins, s.j. (1924–1930)
- R.P. Fernand Faure, s.j. (1930–1933)
- R.P. Joseph Béliveau, s.j. (1933–1940)
- R.P. Martial Caron, s.j. (1940–1943)
- R.P. Louis Mailhot, s.j. (1943–1947)
- R.P. Georges Desjardins, s.j. (1947–1951)
- R.P. J. d'Auteuil Richard, s.j. (1951–1954)
- R.P. Oscar Boily, s.j. (1954–1960)
- R.P. Guy Fortier, s.j. (1960–1964)
- R.P. Alfred Ducharme, s.j. (1964–1967)
- Msgr. Antoine Hacault (1967–1969)
- R.P. Stéphane Valiquette, s.j. (1969–1970)
- Roger Saint-Denis (1970–1974)
- Georges Damphousse (interim) (1974–1975)
- Roland Cloutier (1975–1979)
- Claude Thibault (1980–1981)
- Paul Ruest (1981–2003)
- Raymonde Gagné (2003–2014)
- Gabor Csepregi (2014–2019)

=== Board of Governors ===
The 15-member Board of Governors administers USB affairs. Its duties include managing the institution's assets, appointing senior staff, approving the USB budget, and adding or eliminating programs.

== Notable alumni ==
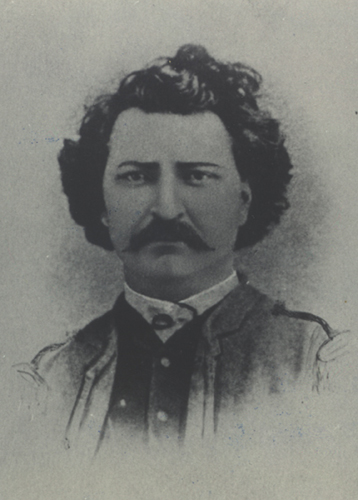
Louis Riel

USB alumni includes judges, lawyers, bishops and archbishops, radio and television personalities, hockey players, architects and singers. A notably famous USB alumnus was Louis Riel, the Métis leader who negotiated the terms under which the province of Manitoba entered Canadian Confederation in 1870.

Notable athletes from the university include:

- Tony Gingras, Stanley Cup champion – Winnipeg Victorias (1901 & 1902)
- Clem Loughlin, Stanley Cup champion – Victoria Cougars (1925)
- Rosario Couture, Stanley Cup champion – Chicago Blackhawks (1934)
- Duke Dutkowski, professional hockey player (NHL)

Among entertainment personalities, notable alumni include political journalist Rosemary Barton and singer Daniel Lavoie.

== University press ==
The Presses universitaires de Saint-Boniface (PUSB) university press was established in 1990. It publishes the research findings of Université de Saint-Boniface faculty and the work of the Centre d’études Franco-canadiennes de l’Ouest (CEFCO) and the Cahiers franco-canadiens de l’Ouest.

To date, PUSB has published works on educational integration, translation, grammar, cultural production, inter-linguistic and socio-cultural relations, and francophone education in a minority setting.

The literary works of Gabrielle Roy and Roger Léveillé have also been published at PUSB.

== See also ==
- Classical college
