= La Liberté (Canada) =

Canadian newspaper in Manitoba

- Type: Weekly newspaper
- Format: Tabloid
- Owner: Presse-Ouest Limitée
- Founder: Archbishop Louis-Philippe-Adélard Langevin
- Associate editor: Sophie Gaulin
- Staff writers: Morgane Lemée, Amandine Cange, Mathilde Errard
- Founded: 1913; 113 years ago
- Language: French
- Headquarters: 420, rue des Meurons; St. Boniface, Man. R2H 2N9
- Circulation: 6,200
- ISSN: 0845-0455
- Website: https://www.la-liberte.ca
- Free online archives: http://la-liberte.mb.ca/celebrations-du-100e/la-liberte%20numerisee

La Liberté (French pronunciation: [la libɛʁte], lit. 'The Liberty') is a Winnipeg, Manitoba, Canada based newspaper founded on May 20, 1913 by Archbishop Adélard Langevin of Saint-Boniface.

La Liberté is currently the only French-speaking provincial weekly newspaper in Manitoba.

== History ==
In 1970, the publication was taken over by Presse-Ouest Limitée which is owned by the francophone cultural organization la Société Franco-Manitobaine (SFM). Its headquarters are at 123 Marion Street in St. Boniface.

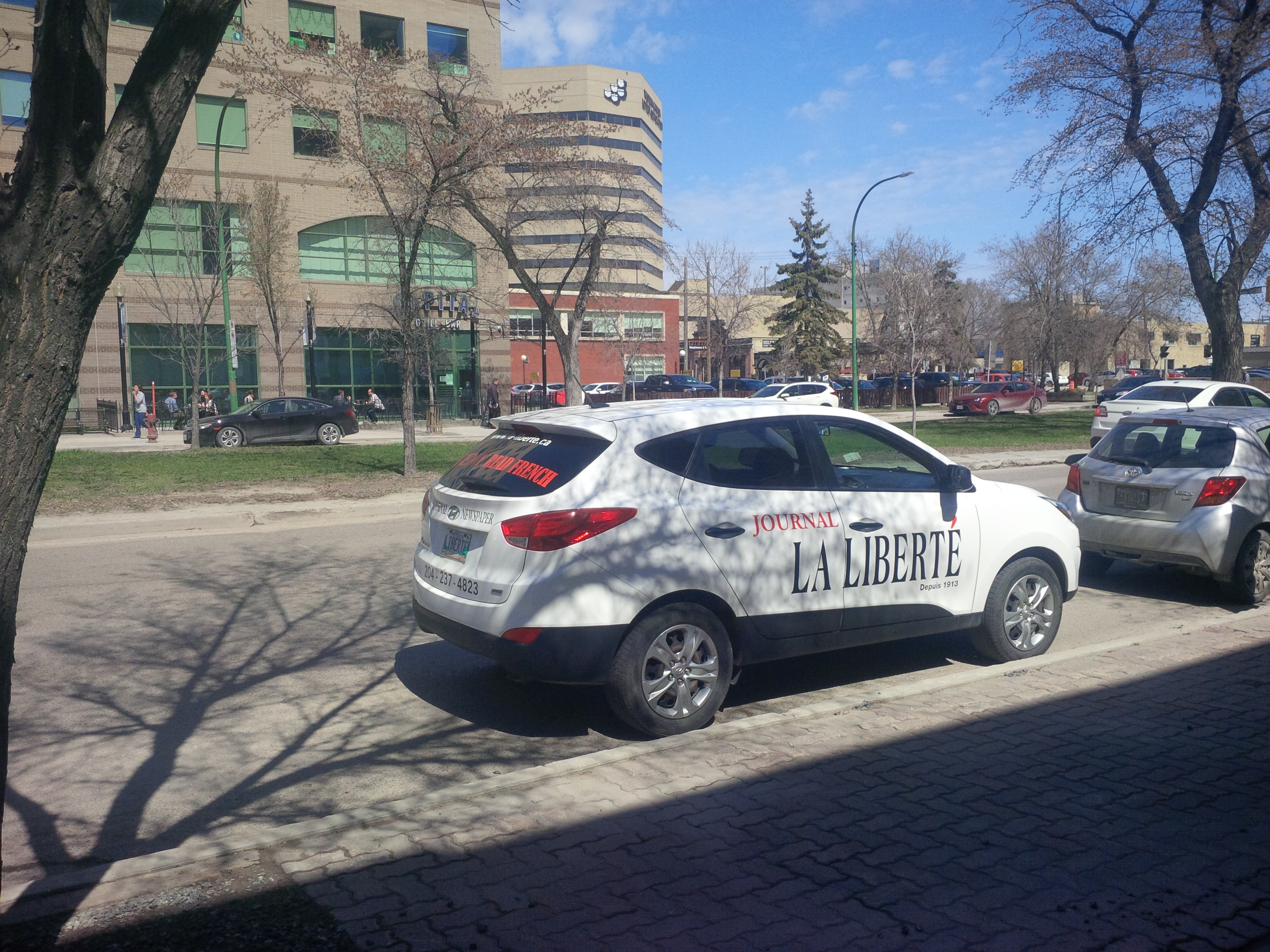
La Liberte car in downtown Winnipeg

The newspaper celebrated its 85th anniversary in 1998. It has a staff of ten people. In 2013, La Liberté celebrated a hundred years of news in Manitoba, en français.

== See also ==
- List of newspapers in Canada
