= Catherine Widgery =

American artist (born 1953)

- Born: 1953; Pittsburgh, Pennsylvania
- Education: Bachelor of Arts degree from Yale University in 1975
- Known for: Sculptor

Catherine Widgery RCA (born 1953) is an American artist. Widgery is known for both her studio-based sculpture work and her public sculpture.

== Early life ==
Widgery was born in Pittsburgh, Pennsylvania. She received a Bachelor of Arts degree from Yale University in 1975 where she graduated cum laude and was awarded special distinction in Fine Arts and the Walker Prize for 'outstanding artistic achievement" by the Fine Arts Faculty.

== Personal life ==
Widgery has lived in different parts of the world US, Canada, London and Rome and Guatemala. She lived in Montreal from 1979 until 2000, when she moved to Truro, Massachusettswhere she lived until 2004 before moving to Guatemala. She currently divides her time between Guatemala and the Boston area.

== Public art ==
Widgery has built more than 40 public art installations across the US and Canada.

Widgery's public art projects include:

- Woven Light, Denver, Colorado,
- Halo, Collège Bourget de Rigaud, Quebec,
- Shadow Play, Mill Avenue/3rd Street station, Valley Metro Rail, Tempe, Arizona,
- Leaves of Wind, El Paso, Texas,
- City People, Royal Bank Plaza, Toronto, Canada,
- Sky Circles, Warm Springs BART station, Fremont, California,
- River Arch, Norwood Bridge, Winnipeg, Manitoba,
- Trail of Dreams, Trail of Ghosts, Santa Fe, New Mexico,
- The facade for the Rideau Centre, Ottawa,
- Four artworks installed in Montreal, Quebec, under the Public Art program of the City of Montreal:
  - Icarus
  - The Passing Song
  - Le Vent Se Lève
  - Wind Boat
- Lightscape (with cj fleury), Blair O-Train station, Ottawa
- Crystal Light, North Temple station in Salt Lake City
- Pass Through The Land, Denver, Colorado

== Collections ==
Her work is included in the collections of the Musée d'art contemporain de Montréal and the Musée national des beaux-arts du Québec.
