= Albert LeGatt =

Archbishop of St. Boniface

- Archbishop of Saint Boniface
- Church: Catholic Church
- Archdiocese: Archdiocese of Saint Boniface
- Appointed: 3 July 2009
- Predecessor: Émilius Goulet
- Previous post: Bishop of Saskatoon (2001-2009)

Orders
- Ordination: 9 June 1983
- Consecration: 5 October 2001 by Blaise-Ernest Morand

Personal details
- Born: 6 May 1953 (age 73) Melfort, Saskatchewan, Dominion of Canada, British Empire

Styles of Albert LeGatt
- Reference style: The Most Reverend
- Spoken style: Your Grace
- Religious style: Archbishop
- Posthumous style: not applicable

Albert LeGatt is the Roman Catholic Archbishop of St. Boniface in the Province of Manitoba, Canada. He was appointed Archbishop by Pope Benedict XVI on 3 July 2009, and received the Pallium on June 29, 2010.

He was born on 6 May 1953, in Melfort, Saskatchewan, to Joseph and Emma LeGatt. Legatt studied at St. Boniface College (University of Manitoba), graduating in 1974 with his B.A. in Philosophy and French. Following graduation he served as a CUSO (Canadian University Services Overseas) volunteer in Ghana teaching French in a secondary school.

In 1977 he entered Le Grand Séminaire de Québec, and was ordained to the priesthood for the Diocese of Prince Albert on 19 June 1983, by Bishop Blaise Morand. For the next seventeen years (1983–2000) he served in a number of parishes in the diocese, as well as co-ordinator of the Diocesan Liturgical Commission, Director of Vocations and Consultor.

In 2000–2001 he pursued studies at the University of Notre Dame; and on 5 October 2001, he was consecrated as Bishop of Saskatoon in St. Patrick's Church by Bishop Morand, Archbishop James Hayes of Halifax and Archbishop Peter Mallon of Regina. He served the Diocese of Saskatoon for eight years until his appointment as Archbishop of St. Boniface in 2009.

LeGatt's Episcopal motto is Ut Unum Sint (Latin: That They May Be One) and is taken from Chapter 17, Verse 22 of The Gospel According to John.

He is Chairman of the Episcopal Commission for Liturgy and the Sacraments – English Sector for the Canadian Conference of Catholic Bishops and a Fourth Degree member of the Knights of Columbus.

Catholic Church titles
Preceded by James Weisgerber	Bishop of Saskatoon; 2001–2009	Succeeded by Donald Bolen
Preceded by Emilius Goulet	Archbishop of St. Boniface; 2009–present	Incumbent
