= Winnipeg Route 30 =

City route in Winnipeg, Canada

Route 30
- Archibald Street; Watt Street
- Route 20 highlighted in red

Route information
- Maintained by City of Winnipeg
- Length: 5.8 km (3.6 mi)
- Existed: 1966–present

Major junctions
- South end: PTH 1 (TCH) / Route 135 (Fermor Ave)
- Route 115 (Marion St); Route 57 west (Provencher Blvd)
- North end: Route 37 (Nairn Ave /Watt St)

Location
- Country: Canada
- Province: Manitoba

Highway system
- Provincial highways in Manitoba; Winnipeg City Routes
← Route 25	→ Route 37

Route 30 is a city route in Winnipeg, Manitoba. It runs from Highway 1/Route 135 (Fermor Avenue) to Route 37 (Nairn Avenue).

The route follows Archibald Street north from Fermor Avenue (Route 135), passing under the CPKC mainline, to Desalaberry Avenue, where the name changes to Watt Street (formerly Archibald Street North). It continues north for one block to Nairn Avenue (Route 37). Historically, the CPR mainline was the boundary between the Parishes of Saint Boniface and Kildonan.

This principal arterial road runs through primarily industrial areas east of downtown, in St. Boniface. With the exception of a short stretch near the intersection of Fermor Avenue, the speed limit is 60 km/h (35 mph).

== Major intersections ==
The entire route is in Winnipeg.

km	mi	Destinations	Notes
0.0	0.0	PTH 1 (TCH) / Fermor Avenue (Route 135)	
3.0	1.9	Route 115 (Marion Street)	
4.8	3.0	Route 57 west (Provencher Boulevard)	
5.7	3.5	Desalaberry Avenue	
5.7	3.5	Archibald Street north end • Watt Street south end	
5.8	3.6	Nairn Avenue (Route 37 east) Route 37 west (Watt Street)	Continues north
1.000 mi = 1.609 km; 1.000 km = 0.621 mi: Route transition
