= Winnipeg Route 37 =

Road in Winnipeg, Canada

Route 37
- Redwood Avenue; Hespeler Avenue; Johnson Ave W / Levis St / Watt St (westbound); Riverton Ave / Midwinter Ave / Levis St (eastbound); Nairn Ave; Regent Avenue W; Plessis Road; Pandora Avenue W; Ravenhurst St
- Route 37 highlighted in red

Route information
- Maintained by City of Winnipeg
- Length: 14.5 km (9.0 mi)
- Existed: 1966–present

Major junctions
- West end: Route 62 south (Salter St)
- Route 52 (Main St); Route 42 (Henderson Hwy); Route 30 south (Watt St); PTH 59 / Route 20 (Lagimodiere Blvd)
- East end: Route 115 (Dugald Rd)

Location
- Country: Canada
- Province: Manitoba

Highway system
- Provincial highways in Manitoba; Winnipeg City Routes
← Route 30	→ Route 42

Route 37 is a major east–west arterial route in Winnipeg, Manitoba which connects the suburbs of Transcona and Elmwood with the downtown core.

== Route description ==
The official route begins on Redwood Avenue at that road's intersection with Salter Street in the city's North End. Route 37 passes over the Redwood Bridge and enters the suburb of Elmwood as Hespeler Avenue, until it meets Henderson Highway. Eastbound traffic bears south on Henderson before bearing right to follow Riverton Avenue, which curves into an eastbound Midwinter Avenue. After a short jog south on Levis Street, it joins Nairn Avenue. Westbound traffic turns north off Nairn onto Watt Street before turning west onto Levis, then Johnson Avenue West. Meeting Henderson, route 37 heads south three blocks before bearing west on Hespeler Avenue.

Route 37 continues over the CP main line towards Transcona as Nairn Avenue, Regent Avenue West, Pandora Avenue West, and Pandora Avenue East. It turns southbound on Ravenhurst Street and ends at the intersection of Ravenhurst with Dugald Road.

== History ==
Redwood Avenue was named for the red roof of a store that was once located on the banks of the Red River. Hespeler Avenue was named for William Hespeler, a member of the Manitoba Legislative Assembly, in the early 1900s. Johnson Avenue was named for Francis Godschall Johnson, the governor of Assiniboia from 1855 to 1859. Stadacona Street was named after the Quebec village. Nairn Avenue is named for local businessman Stephen Nairn. Watt Street was known as Archibald Street North prior to 1962.

== Major Intersections ==
From west to east; all intersections are at-grade unless otherwise indicated:

The entire route is in Winnipeg.

Street Name	km	mi	Destinations	Notes
Redwood Avenue	−3.66	−2.27	Sheppard Street	Redwood Avenue western terminus
Redwood Avenue	−1.48	−0.92	McPhillips Street (Route 180)	
Redwood Avenue	−1.78	−1.11	Canadian Pacific Railway Winnipeg Beach subdivision	Level crossing
Redwood Avenue	−1.21	−0.75	Arlington Street	
Redwood Avenue	−0.60	−0.37	McGregor Street	
Redwood Avenue	0.00	0.00	Salter Street (Route 62 south)	Route 37 western terminus
Redwood Avenue	0.53	0.33	Main Street (Route 52)	
Red River	0.80– 0.98	0.50– 0.61	Harry Lazarenko Bridge Redwood Avenue east end. Hespeler Avenue west end.	
Hespeler Avenue	1.31	0.81	Beatrice Street	
Hespeler Avenue	1.72	1.07	Henderson Highway (Route 42)	Route 37 west branches north onto Henderson Highway; Route 37 east branches south onto Henderson Highway
Henderson Highway	1.94	1.21	Henderson Highway (Route 42 north) / Johnson Avenue W	Route 37 west branches east onto Johnson Avenue W; north end of Route 42 concurrency
Henderson Highway	2.02	1.26	Henderson Highway (Route 42 south) / Riverton Avenue	Route 37 east branches west onto Riverton Avenue; south end of Route 42 concurrency
Riverton Avenue (eastbound)	2.13	1.32	Midwinter Avenue	Route 37 east branches south onto Midwinter Avenue
Johnson Avenue W (westbound)	2.18	1.35	Brazier Street	
Johnson Avenue W (westbound)	2.50	1.55	Roch Street	
Johnson Avenue W (westbound)	2.73	1.70	Levis Street	Route 37 west branches east onto Levis Street
Levis Street (westbound)	2.84	1.76	Watt Street	Route 37 west branches south onto Watt Street
Midwinter Avenue (eastbound)	2.84	1.76	Levis Street	Route 37 east branches south onto Levis Street
Levis Street (eastbound)	2.95	1.83	Stadacona Street / Nairn Avenue / Louise Bridge	Route 37 east branches east onto Nairn Avenue
Watt Street (westbound)	3.37	2.09	Talbot Avenue	
Watt Street (westbound); Nairn Avenue (eastbound)	3.55	2.21	Watt Street (Route 30)	Route 37 west branches east onto Nairn Avenue
CP Keewatin Subdivision	3.75– 4.00	2.33– 2.49	Nairn Overpass	
Nairn Avenue	4.30	2.67	Grey Street	
Nairn Avenue	4.82	3.00	Chester Street	
Nairn Avenue	5.16	3.21	Kent Street	
Nairn Avenue	5.45	3.39	Keenleyside Street	
Nairn Avenue	6.05	3.76	Panet Road	Nairn Avenue east end. Regent Avenue W west end
Regent Avenue W	6.28	3.90	Lagimodiere Boulevard (Route 20)	
Regent Avenue W	6.61	4.11	Stapon Road - Kildonan Place	
Regent Avenue W	7.12	4.42	Rougeau Avenue	
Regent Avenue W	7.36	4.57	Peguis Street	
Regent Avenue W	7.44	4.62	CEMR Pine Falls subdivision	Level crossing
Regent Avenue W	8.26	5.13	Owen Street	
Regent Avenue W	9.45	5.87	Plessis Road	Route 37 branches south onto Plessis Road
Plessis Road	9.63	5.98	Pandora Avenue W	Route 37 branches east onto Pandora Avenue W
Pandora Avenue W	11.27	7.00	Day Street	Pandora Avenue W east end. Pandora Avenue E west end
Pandora Avenue E	13.73	8.53	Ravenhurst Street	Route 37 branches south onto Ravenhurst Street
Ravenhurst Street	14.20	8.82	Renshaw Boulevard	Roundabout
Ravenhurst Street	14.40	8.95	CN Redditt subdivision	Level crossing
Ravenhurst Street	14.55	9.04	Dugald Road (Route 115)	Route 37 eastern terminus
1.000 mi = 1.609 km; 1.000 km = 0.621 mi: Closed/former; Concurrency terminus; Route transition
