= Arathia =

Arathia was a city and bishopric in the late Roman province of Cappadocia Prima, Asia Minor, whose ecclesiastical metropolis was at Caesarea (modern Kayseri, Turkey). Its location is unknown. The bishopric was revived as Latin titular see of the Catholic Church in the 18th century.

== History ==
The ancient city was important enough to become a bishopric in the late Roman province of Cappadocia Prima (civil Diocese of Pontus), in the sway of the Patriarchate of Constantinople, but would fade completely, plausibly at the advent of Islam. Neither its precise location is known, nor any residential bishop.

- It has been confused in sources with the sees of Arad in Jordan (Holy Land) and Aradus in Syria (Phoenicia).

== Titular see ==
The diocese was nominally restored as Latin Catholic titular bishopric no later than 1755 under the names Arathia / Arata (Curiate Italian) / Arath / Aratia (Latin) / Arathen(sis) / Arathien(sis) (Latin adjective).

It has been vacant since 1853 (effectively suppressed?), having had the following incumbents, all of the fitting Episcopal (lowest) rank :

- Richard Lincoln (1755.11.21 – 1757.06.21) as Coadjutor Archbishop of Dublin (Ireland) (1755.11.21 – 1757.06.21), later succeeded as Metropolitan Archbishop of Dublin (Ireland) (1757.06.21 – death 1763)
- Toussaint Duvernin (1757.05.23 – 1785.08.08) as Auxiliary Bishop of Diocese of Strasbourg (France) (1757.05.23 – death 1785.08.08)
- Andrzej Chołoniewski (1804.08.20 – 1819) as Auxiliary Bishop of Diocese of Vilnius (Lithuania) (1804.08.20 – death 1819)
- Józef Marceli Dzięcielski (1819.12.17 – 1825.12.21) as Auxiliary Bishop of Diocese of Kujawy–Kaliska (Poland) (1819.12.17 – 1825.12.21); later Bishop of Lublin (Poland) (1825.12.21 – death 1839.02.14)
- Francis Patrick Kenrick (1830.02.25 – 1842.04.22) as Coadjutor Bishop of Pennsylvania, Philadelphia (USA) (1830.02.25 – 1842.04.22); later succeeded as Bishop of Philadelphia (1842.04.22 – 1851.08.19), Metropolitan Archbishop of Baltimore (Maryland, USA) (1851.08.19 – death 1863.07.08)
- Alexandre-Antonin Taché, Missionary Oblates of Mary Immaculate (O.M.I.) (1850.06.12 – 1853.06.07) as Coadjutor Bishop of Saint-Boniface (Canada) (1850.06.12 – 1853.06.07); later succeeded as last suffragan Bishop of Saint-Boniface (Canada) (1853.06.07 – 1871.09.22), promoted first Metropolitan Archbishop of Saint-Boniface (1871.09.22 – death 1894.06.22).

== Sources and external links ==
- GCatholic - data for all sections

Bibliography

- Konrad Eubel, Hierarchia Catholica Medii Aevi, vol. 6, pp. 94–95; vol. 7, p. 85; vol. 8, p. 115
- Gaetano Moroni, lemma 'Cappadocia' in Dizionario di erudizione storico-ecclesiastica da S. Pietro sino ai nostri giorni, Venice, 1841, p. 93–95
