= Winnipeg Route 115 =

City route in Winnipeg, Canada

Route 115
- Marion Street / Goulet Street; Dugald Road
- Route 115 highlighted in red

Route information
- Maintained by City of Winnipeg
- Length: 12.6 km (7.8 mi)
- Existed: 1966–present

Major junctions
- West end: Route 52 (St. Mary's Rd)
- Route 30 (Archibald St); PTH 59 / Route 20 (Lagimodiere Blvd); Route 37 (Ravenhurst St)
- East end: PTH 101 (Perimeter Hwy) / PTH 15 east

Location
- Country: Canada
- Province: Manitoba

Highway system
- Provincial highways in Manitoba; Winnipeg City Routes
← Route 105	→ Route 125

Route 115 is a major east–west arterial route in the Winnipeg suburbs of St. Boniface and Transcona. It is the western extension of Manitoba Highway 15, which runs eastward to the communities of Dugald and Elma, Manitoba. Within the city boundaries it connects the largely industrial areas of south Transcona and east St. Boniface with Old St. Boniface and (via St. Mary's Road) downtown.

== Route description ==
Route 115 begins at St. Mary's Road and runs eastward through Old St. Boniface as two one-way streets: Goulet Street for westbound traffic, Marion Street for eastbound traffic. The streets join at their intersection with Rue Youville just west of the Seine River, and the two-way road continues as Marion Street eastward to Lagimodiere Boulevard. The route jogs north on Lagimodiere for approximately 450 meters before continuing eastward as Dugald Road, becoming Manitoba Highway 15 as it passes by the Perimeter Highway.

Goulet Street was named for Maxime Goulet, a member of the Legislative Assembly of Manitoba (MLA) in the 19th century. Marion Street was named for Roger Marion, mayor of St. Boniface from 1887 to 1889 and a Manitoba MLA.

== Major intersections ==
From west to east: The entire route is in Winnipeg.

Street Name	km	mi	Destinations	Notes
Marion Street	0.0	0.0	PTH 1 west / St. Mary's Road (Route 52 north)	Route 115 western terminus; no southbound exit
Marion Street (eastbound); Goulet Street (westbound)	0.2	0.12	One-way transition	Goulet Street west end
Marion Street (eastbound); Goulet Street (westbound)	0.4	0.25	To PTH 1 east / Route 52 south / Tache Ave	
Marion Street	1.4	0.87	One-way transition	Goulet Street east end
Marion Street	2.1	1.3	Archibald Street (Route 30)	
Lagimodiere Boulevard	4.0	2.5	PTH 59 south / Lagimodiere Boulevard (Route 20 south)	Route 115 turns onto Lagimodiere Boulevard; west end of PTH 59 / Route 20 concurrency
Dugald Road	4.4	2.7	PTH 59 north / Lagimodiere Boulevard (Route 20 north) / Dugald Road	Route 115 turns onto Dugald Road; east end of PTH 59 / Route 20 concurrency
Dugald Road	7.8	4.8	Plessis Road	
Dugald Road	11.9	7.4	Ravenhurst Street (Route 37 west)	
Dugald Road	12.6	7.8	Perimeter Highway (PTH 101) PTH 15 east – Anola	Route 115 eastern terminus; PTH 15 western terminus; PTH 15 continues east
1.000 mi = 1.609 km; 1.000 km = 0.621 mi: Concurrency terminus; Incomplete access; Route transition
