= Archdiocese of Saint Boniface =

Catholic ecclesiastical territory

Coordinates: 49.8895°N 97.1238°W

Archdiocese of Saint Boniface Archidioecesis Sancti Bonifacii

Location
- Country: Canada
- Ecclesiastical province: Saint Boniface
- Population: 112,620 (25.2%)

Information
- Denomination: Catholic
- Sui iuris church: Latin Church
- Rite: Roman Rite
- Established: 1871
- Cathedral: St. Boniface Cathedral

Current leadership
- Pope: Leo XIV
- Archbishop: Albert LeGatt
- Bishops emeritus: Émilius Goulet

Website
- archsaintboniface.ca

The Roman Catholic Archdiocese of Saint-Boniface (Latin: Archidioecesis Sancti Bonifacii) is a Latin archdiocese in part of the civil Province of Manitoba in Canada. Despite having no suffragan dioceses, the archdiocese is nominally metropolitan and is an ecclesiastical province by itself. It is currently led by Archbishop Albert LeGatt.

The cathedral of the archdiocese is a minor basilica, St. Boniface Cathedral, Winnipeg.

== History ==
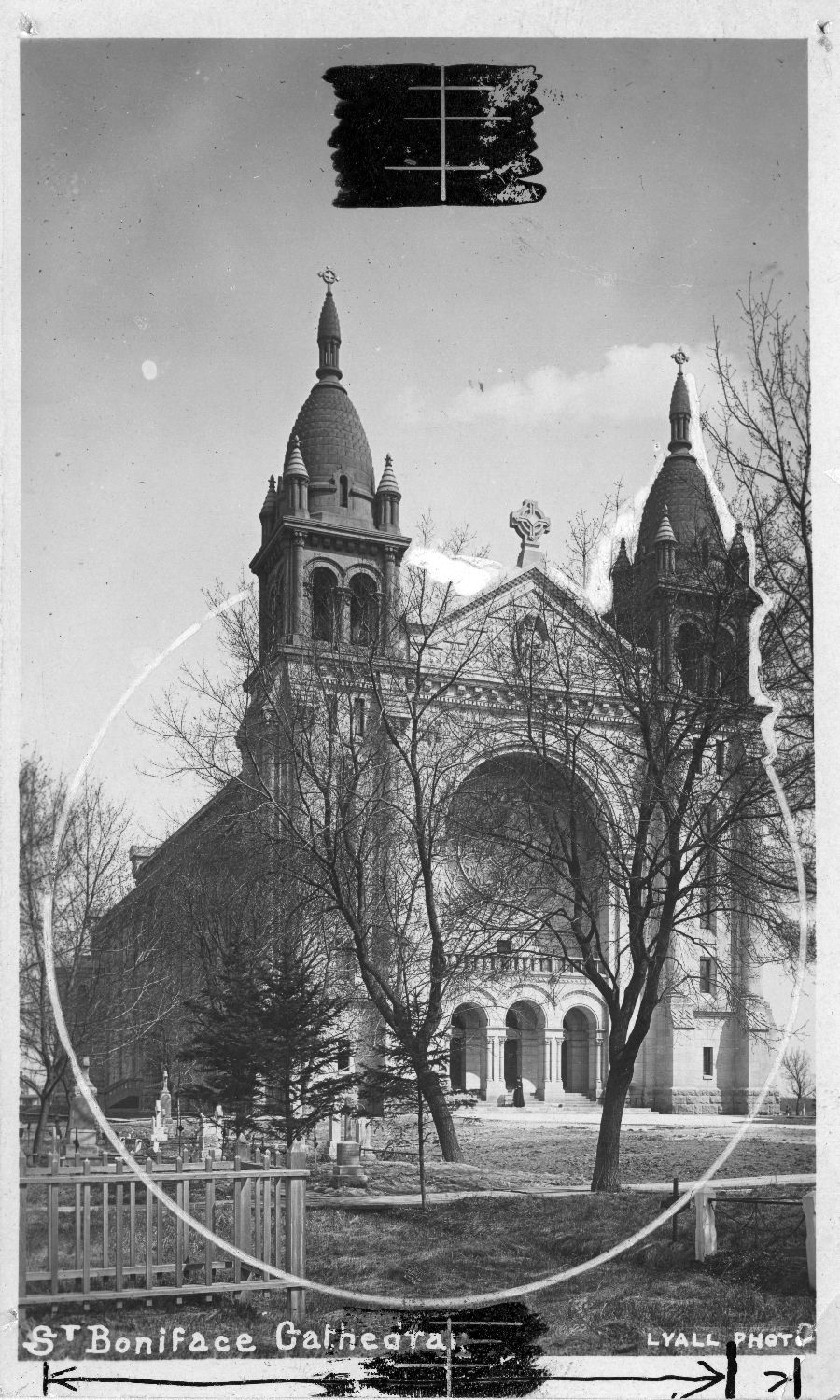
St. Boniface Cathedral in 1927

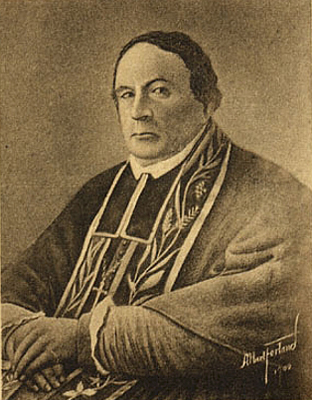
Joseph Provencher

In 1817, settlers at the Red River Colony petitioned Joseph-Octave Plessis, Bishop of Quebec, for a resident priest. In 1818, Plessis sent Rev. Joseph-Norbert Provencher, Rev. Dumoulin and seminarian Guilaume Etienne Edge to open a mission on the Red River in present-day Manitoba, where the majority of settlers were Irish and Scottish Catholics. Provencher's assignment was to convert the Indian nations and to "morally improve" the delinquent Christians who had "adopted the ways of the Indians."

Arriving at Fort Douglas in mid-July, they were given land on the east bank of the Red River by Thomas Douglas, 5th Earl of Selkirk, of the Hudson's Bay Company. They immediately set to work to build a house before winter. Part of the building served as a chapel, which Provencher dedicated to the missionary, Saint Boniface. The mission at Saint-Boniface was highly successful. In 1819, Provencher was appointed Auxiliary Bishop of Quebec with the titular title of Bishop of Juliopolis, and vicar general for the northwest. A second parish, St. François Xavier, was established in 1828 for a Métis community established by Cuthbert Grant at White Horse Plains.

Construction of Saint-Boniface Cathedral commenced in 1832 and was completed in 1839. In 1844, Bishop Provencher persuaded four sisters of the Grey Nuns of Montreal to come to Saint-Boniface. In 1845, the Vicariate Apostolic of the North West was formed with Provencher as ordinary. The area separated from Archdiocese of Québec comprised the entire territory west of the Great Lakes and as far north as the Pole. In 1847, the North West Vicariate was raised to the status of diocese, suffragan to Québec. In June 1850, Oblate missioner Alexandre-Antonin Taché was named coadjutor bishop to Provencher, whom he succeeded upon Provencher's death in July 1853. The following year, the name of the diocese was changed from that of the Diocese of the North West to the Diocese of Saint-Boniface.

On April 8, 1862 the Apostolic Vicariate of Athabaska Mackenzie was erected from territory split off from the Diocese of Saint-Boniface. On September 22, 1871 Saint-Boniface was raised to a metropolitan archdiocese, while at the same time, it lost territory with the establishment of the Diocese of Saint Albert. Taché became the first archbishop. In 1874, he brought the Sisters of the Holy Names of Jesus and Mary from Québec to teach at St. Mary's Academy (Winnipeg). The area of the Archdiocese was again reduced on July 11, 1882 as part of its contribution to the Apostolic Vicariate of Pontiac, but was increased in 1889 with the reassignment of some land from the Diocese of Saint Albert.

Established On 4 June 1891, the Apostolic Vicariate of Saskatchewan was established from territory drawn from the Metropolitan Archdiocese of Saint-Boniface. In 1900, under Archbishop Adélard Langevin, Holy Ghost Parish was established in North Winnipeg to serve Polish Catholics. In 1904, St. Joseph's was founded for the German Catholics in the community. The French church of Sacré Coeur was dedicated in 1905 for former parishioners of St. Mary's. In 1898, Langevin asked the Soeurs de Misericorde from Montreal to assist unwed mothers. They opened, in 1900, a maternity hospital which later developed into Misericordia Health Centre.

The Diocese of Regina was erected on March 4, 1910 from Saint-Boniface, as was the Archdiocese of Winnipeg on December 4, 1915 and the Diocese of Fort William on April 29, 1952.

== St. Boniface Cathedral ==
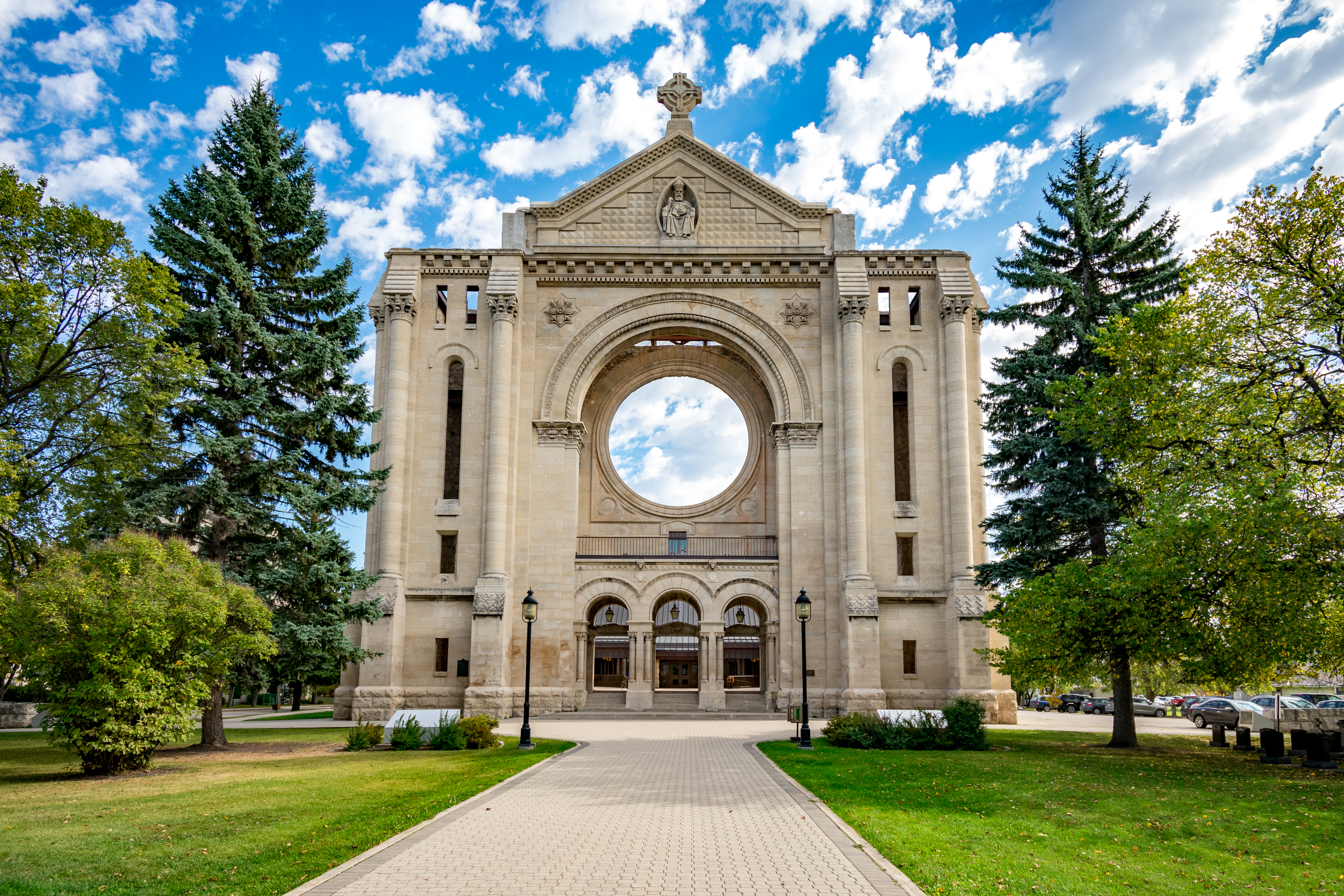
St. Boniface Cathedral

The present cathedral stands on a site that has seen two churches and four cathedrals. The original log chapel was built by Provencher in 1818 and subsequently replaced by a larger structure. In 1832, Provencher, now a bishop, built the first cathedral which was destroyed by fire on December 14, 1860. In 1862, Bishop Alexandre Antonin Taché rebuilt the cathedral in stone. A larger building was completed in 1908 in French Romanesque style, and was designated a minor basilica in 1949. This sustained significant damage in a 1968 fire. The present Saint-Boniface incorporates some features of its predecessor, notably the impressive façade.

== Bishops ==
=== Diocesan Ordinaries ===
Apostolic Vicar of North-West

- Joseph-Norbert Provencher (1844.04.16 – 1847.06.04 see below), Titular Bishop of Iuliopolis (1820.02.01 – 1847.06.04), earlier as Auxiliary Bishop of Québec (Canada) (1820.02.01 – 1844.04.16)

Suffragan Bishops of Saint-Boniface

- Joseph-Norbert Provencher (see above 1847.06.04 – death 1853.06.07)
- Alexandre-Antonin Taché Missionary Oblates of Mary Immaculate (O.M.I.) (1853.06.07 – 1871.09.22 see below), succeeding as former Coadjutor Bishop of Saint-Boniface (1850.06.12 – 1853.06.07) and Titular Bishop of Arathia (1850.06.12 – 1853.06.07)

Archbishops of Saint-Boniface

- Alexandre-Antonin Taché O.M.I. (see above 1871.09.22 – death 1894.06.22)
- Louis Philip Adélard Langevin (1895.01.08 – death 1915.06.15)
- Arthur Béliveau (1915.11.09 – death 1955.09.14), succeeding as former Auxiliary Bishop of Saint-Boniface (1913.05.24 – 1915.11.09) and Titular Bishop of Domitiopolis (1913.05.24 – 1915.11.09)
- Maurice Baudoux (1955.09.14 – retired 1974.09.07), previously Bishop of Saint-Paul (Alberta, Canada) (1948.08.12 – 1952.03.04), then Titular Archbishop of Preslavus (1952.03.04 – 1955.09.14) as Coadjutor Archbishop of Saint-Boniface (1952.03.04 – succession 1955.09.14); died 1988
- Antoine Hacault (1974.09.07 – death 2000.04.13), previously Titular Bishop of Media (1964.07.30 – 1972.10.28) as Auxiliary Bishop of Saint-Boniface (1964.07.30 – 1972.10.28), then Titular Archbishop of the same Media (1972.10.28 – 1974.09.07) as Coadjutor Archbishop of Saint-Boniface (1972.10.28 – succession 1974.09.07)
- Émilius Goulet, Sulpicians (P.S.S.) (2001.06.23 – retired 3 July 2009)
- Albert LeGatt (3 July 2009 – ...), previously Bishop of Saskatoon (Canada) (2001.07.26 – 2009.07.03).

=== Coadjutor bishops ===
- Vital-Justin Grandin, O.M.I. (1857–1871), became bishop of the Diocese of St Albert
- Georges Cabana (1941–1952), became archbishop of the Archdiocese of Sherbrooke

=== Other priests of this diocese who became bishops ===
- Pierre-Emile-Jean-Baptiste-Marie Grouard, O.M.I. (priest here, 1862–1863), appointed Vicar Apostolic of Athabaska Mackenzie, Alberta in 1890
- Léo Blais, appointed Bishop of Prince-Albert, Saskatchewan in 1952
- Aimé Décosse, appointed Bishop of Gravelbourg, Saskatchewan in 1953
- Remi Joseph De Roo, appointed Bishop of Victoria, British Columbia in 1962
- Noël Delaquis, appointed Bishop of Gravelbourg, Saskatchewan in 1973 (resigned that see in 1995; returned to this diocese in 2014)
- Raymond Roussin, Born In St Vital, Bishop of Gravelbourg 1995–1999, Bishop of Victoria 1999–2004, Archbishop of Vancouver 2004-2009
- Marcel Damphousse, appointed Bishop of Alexandria-Cornwall, Ontario in 2012

== Statistics and extent ==
The archdiocese covers much of the province south of Lake Winnipeg and east of the Red River. It is a bilingual French and English archdiocese. Saint Boniface is a city ward of Winnipeg that sits on the east side of the Red River, and the area is a traditional home of Franco-Manitobans.

As of 2021, the archdiocese contains 87 parishes chaplaincies and missions, 59 diocesan priests, 23 religious priests, 5 seminarians and 135,309 Catholics. It also has 143 Women Religious, 8 Religious Brothers, and 19 permanent deacons. The archdiocese and the Ukrainian Catholic Archeparchy of Winnipeg jointly operate a number of parochial schools in Winnipeg.

== See also ==
- List of Catholic dioceses in Canada

== Sources - Bibliography ==
- Herbermann, Charles, ed. (1913). "Saint Boniface" . Catholic Encyclopedia. New York: Robert Appleton Company.

== Sources and external links ==
- Archdiocese of St. Boniface site
- Catholic Schools Commission
- Archdiocese of Saint-Boniface page at catholichierarchy.org retrieved July 14, 2006
- "And the Desert Shall Bloom" -200th Anniversary of the Catholic Church in Western Canada
