= Alexandre-Antonin Taché =

Canadian Catholic bishop (1823–1894)

The Most Reverend Alexandre-Antonin Taché OMI
- Archbishop of Saint Boniface
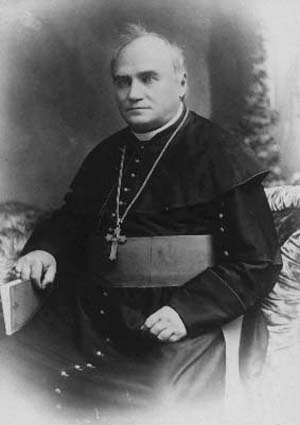
- Taché circa 1890
- Church: Latin Church
- Archdiocese: Saint Boniface
- Installed: 7 June 1853
- Term ended: 22 June 1894
- Predecessor: Norbert Provencher
- Successor: Adélard Langevin

Orders
- Ordination: 12 October 1845
- Consecration: 23 November 1851

Personal details
- Born: 23 July 1823 Fraserville, Lower Canada
- Died: 22 June 1894 (aged 70) St. Boniface, Manitoba, Canada
- Buried: St. Boniface Cathedral Cemetery
- Denomination: Catholic
- Parents: Charles Taché and Louise-Henriette de Labroquerie
- Occupation: Missionary and Archbishop
- Profession: Cleric
- Education: Grand Seminaire, Montreal, Quebec

Alexandre-Antonin Taché OMI (French pronunciation: [alɛksɑ̃dʁ ɑ̃tɔnɛ̃ taʃe]; 23 July 1823 – 22 June 1894) was a Canadian Catholic priest, missionary of the Oblate order, author, and the first Archbishop of Saint Boniface in Manitoba, Canada.

== Early life ==
Alexandre-Antonin Taché was born in Fraserville, Lower Canada (now Rivière-du-Loup, Quebec), on 23 July 1823, to a merchant named Charles Taché, and Louise-Henriette de Labroquerie, a descendant of the famed explorers Louis Jolliet and Gaultier de Varennes. When his father died in January 1826, the widowed Louise-Henriette was forced to return to her family home in Boucherville. The young Alexandre was raised there under the care of his uncle, in a home where the arts, study, and the Catholic faith were part of the daily fabric of life.

He attended the junior seminary at Saint-Hyacinthe starting in September 1833. While there, Taché started to feel a religious calling, which was guided and supported by his mother and the faculty of the school. Deciding that he did want to become a priest, after graduation from the seminary, he entered the Major Seminary run by the Sulpician Fathers in Montreal, where he began his studies for ordination.

There, Taché made a strong impression on the staff and on Bishop Ignace Bourget of Montreal. Before he had even completed his theological studies, the bishop appointed him Regent of the College of Chambly, and in January 1844 as professor of mathematics at his old school in Saint-Hyacinthe. Since his meeting the newly arrived community of Missionary Oblates of Mary Immaculate from France in December 1841, Taché had felt drawn to their way of life. When he completed his seminary studies in 1844, he began to consider joining the congregation, feeling a desire to preach to the people of the West, who had been made known to the French colony by the explorations of his own ancestors. Despite the objections of his family (with the exception of his mother), he entered the Oblate novitiate in Longueuil in the fall of that year.

== Oblate missionary ==
Taché soon expressed an urge to preach to the Native American population of the west. Upon completion of his novitiate in 1845, even though he was still only a subdeacon, he was sent by his superiors to Saint Boniface in the Red River Colony, now in Manitoba. He accompanied Father Pierre Aubert, O.M.I., who was to organize the Oblate mission in that region. They set out from Montreal on 25 June, travelling the entire distance of 1,400 miles to Saint Boniface by canoe, arriving on the following 25 August. They went to work with Bishop Joseph-Norbert Provencher, the new Vicar Apostolic of the Northwest Territories.

Provencher ordained Taché a deacon a week later and a priest on 12 October 1845. Taché made his profession of vows as an Oblate the following day to Aubert. He studied the basics of the Ojibwe language and was sent to start a mission in Île-à-la-Crosse. Later, he also became proficient in Cree and Athabaskan.

== Bishop ==
In 1847 the Holy See created the Diocese of Saint Boniface, and named Provencher its first bishop. In June 1850, Taché was named titular bishop of Arathia and Provencher's coadjutor bishop, when he was still only 27 years old; he did not receive the news of his appointment, until January 1851. He was consecrated a bishop on 23 November 1851 in Marseille, France, by St. Eugene de Mazenod, founder of the Missionary Oblates. Provencher died on 7 June 1853, and Taché automatically succeeded him as the Bishop of St. Boniface.

The following years saw Taché serving a widespread region of which about half of the population were Catholics. He worked with a number of groups including the Saulteaux, Crees, Athabaskans and Chippeways. He was involved in the difficult years when the Territories were absorbed into Canada. He also traveled to Europe, where he sought assistance from his congregation, funds and volunteers. The most prominent were Constantine Scollen and Emile Petitot who went to Canada with him in 1862. In the unrest among the Métis people in the political process, he was called upon by the federal government to act as its representative to avoid the possibility of a civil war. He was even called back by them from Rome in 1870, where he was participating in the First Vatican Council, to reach out to Métis leaders who were leading a rebellion against the Canadian government. However, the Oblate policy of encouraging Catholic families to settle in the homeland of the Metis and First Nations peoples meant that he had little influence and he was unable to prevent the Riel Rebellion of 1885.

In September 1871, the Holy See raised the status of the diocese to that of archdiocese, and Taché became the first Archbishop of St. Boniface. He was keen to encourage Catholic families to settle in the North West and from 1872 used Fr Albert Lacombe and Fr Doucet as a recruiter of families from Eastern Canada and the United States and later Europe.

Taché regarded Manitoba as a sister province of Quebec, and promoted French Canadian immigration and the linguistic and educational rights of French-speaking Catholics in the Northwest. Taché was involved in the controversy surrounding the suppression of French as an official language and the abolition of confessional schools in Manitoba and he wrote many pamphlets and letters denouncing this legislation.

Taché died in Saint Boniface on 22 June 1894, following 15 years of declining health, and was buried in the St. Boniface Cathedral Cemetery. Named in his honour are the Rural Municipality of Taché, Tache Hall at the University of Manitoba, a cairn in La Verendrye Park in Winnipeg, and Tache Avenue in Saint Boniface.

== Publications ==
Taché wrote many books, including;

- Vingt Années de Missions Dans le Nord-Ouest de L'Amérique (1866)
- Écoles Séparées: Partie des Négociations A Ottawa en (1870)
- Sketch of the North West of America (1870)
- L’amnistie (1874)
- A Page of the History of the Schools in Manitoba During 75 Years, (1893)
- The "Good Fight" and the Illusive Vision
