= Norwood Bridge =

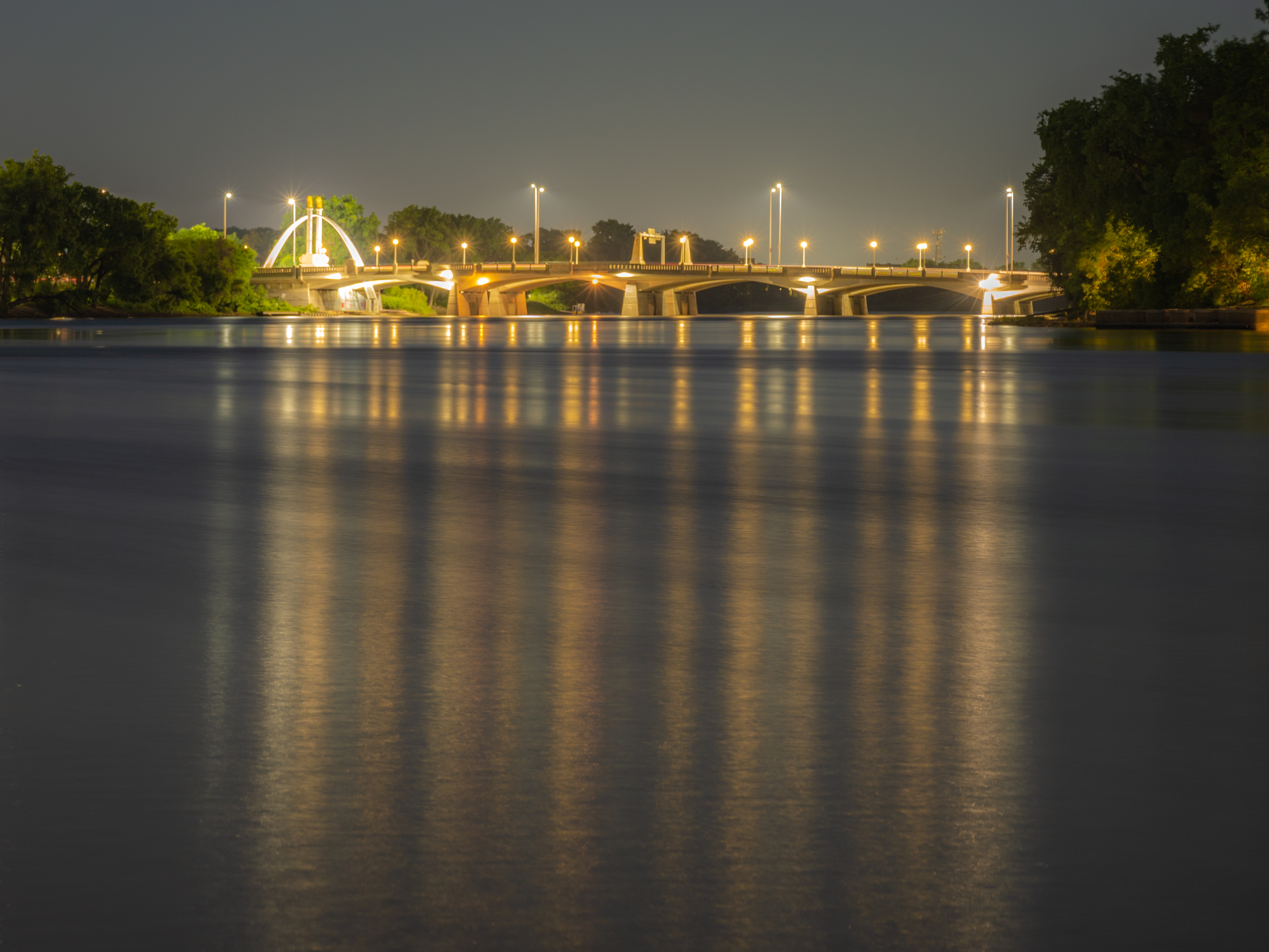
- Norwood Bridge at night, with the "River Arch" sculpture visible at its approach
- Coordinates: 49°52′58.1″N 97°7′48.4″W
- Carries: Motor vehicles, pedestrians and bicycles
- Crosses: Red River
- Locale: Winnipeg, Manitoba, Canada

Characteristics
- Total length: 167 m (548 ft)
- No. of spans: 2

History
- Opened: 19 October 1999

Location
- Interactive map of Norwood Bridge

The Norwood Bridge is a five-span, 167-metre (548 ft) vehicular bridge over the Red River in Winnipeg, Manitoba, Canada. The bridge links downtown Winnipeg with the Norwood neighbourhood of St. Boniface, and serves Route 52.

The bridge bears a sculpture, called River Arch, between the east and west spans at the southern landing.

== River Arch ==
River Arch is the sculpture that sits upon the Norwood Bridge, between the east and west spans at the southern landing.

The sculpture was commissioned by the City of Winnipeg and was the winning proposal in a national competition by artist Catherine Widgery. The sculpture is made of stone, stainless steel, aluminum, gold leaf, and concrete, and includes an arch and two 40-foot (12 m) columns, each topped with golden sheaves of wheat. The arch bears a pixelated image from a photograph of a harvested field. Each column bears a sculpture of the head of a bison on each side of the base.

== Bridge history ==
=== Preceding bridges ===
The first Norwood bridge was a privately built toll bridge, complete in 1890. It was purchased by the City of St Boniface in 1904. With the bridge being deemed unsafe in 1929, negotiations toward construction of a replacement bridge began in the fall of 1930 between the Cities of Winnipeg and St Boniface.

The original cost estimate for the bridge's replacement was $620,000, with costs shared between the federal and provincial governments, as well as between both the City of Winnipeg and City of St Boniface.

The bridge was built in the 1930s, and was eventually demolished in 1997 by McColman & Sons Demolition Ltd. The bridge had consisted of approximately 1,400 tons of steel and 2,000 meters of concrete. The adjacent railway overpass was a significant impediment with a low overhead clearance of 3.58 m (11 ft 9 in) before its replacement in 1995.

=== Current bridge ===
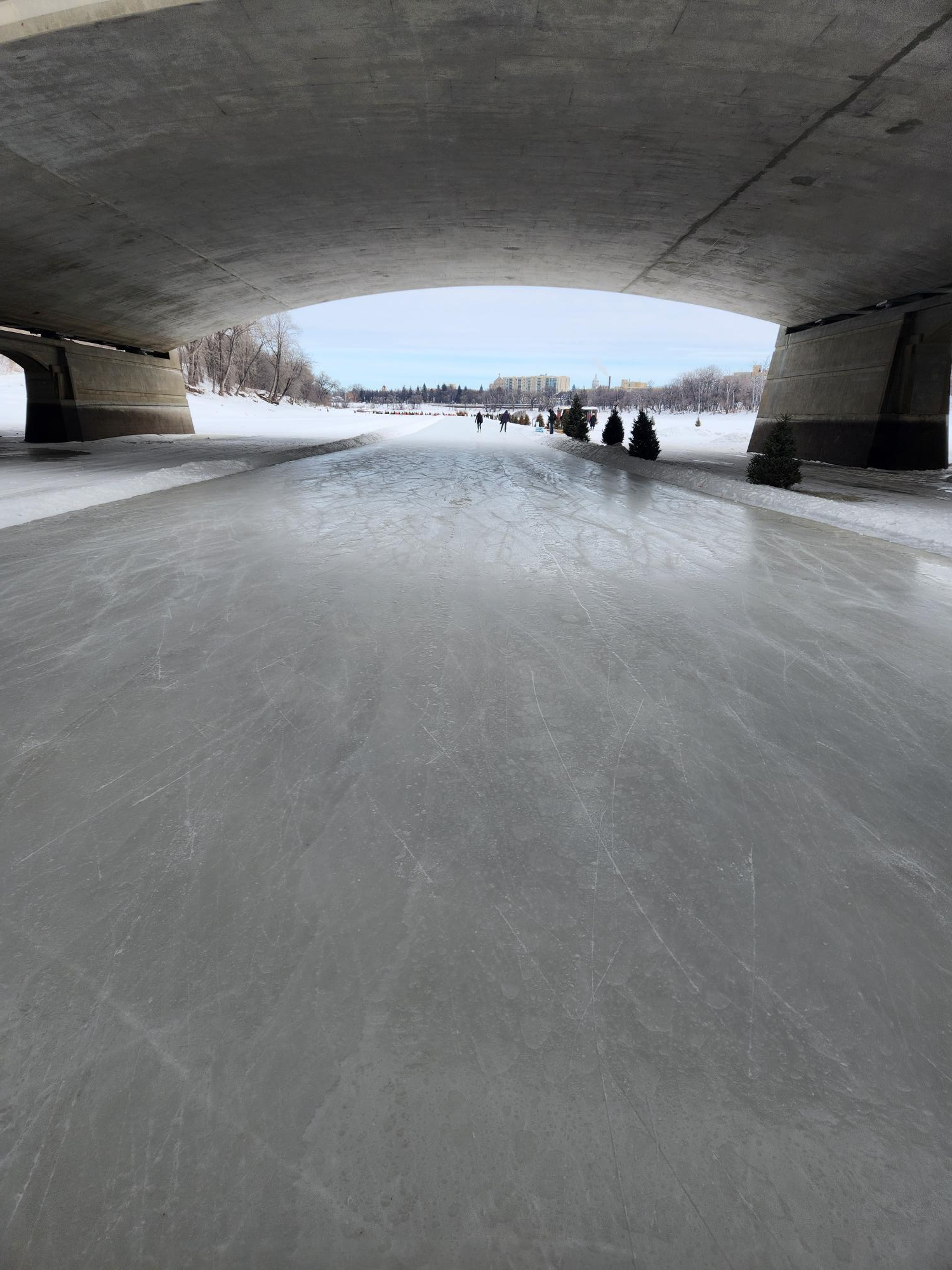
Red River of the North Nestaweya River Trail going under the Norwood Bridge looking northbound

The construction of the current Norwood Bridge required relocation of the City of Winnipeg Water Utility pumphouse from the east side of Main Street to its west side.

The Norwood Bridge was constructed by PCL Constructors Canada. The foundation consists of four cast-in-place piers founded on tremied bedrock footings. The construction of bridge was the first in Winnipeg to use large, flat-topped barges instead of work bridges, and implemented northern ice road building techniques to use large cranes and other construction equipment on the river.

The bridge was opened on 19 October 1999.

== See also ==
- List of bridges in Canada
- List of bridges
