= Experimental & Clinical Cardiology =

- Discipline: Cardiology
- Language: English

Publication details
- History: 1996–2014
- Publisher: Cardiology Academic Press
- Frequency: Quarterly
- Open access: Yes
- License: CC BY 3.0 Unported License
- Impact factor: 0.758 (2013)

Standard abbreviations
- ISO 4: Exp. Clin. Cardiol.

Indexing
- ISSN: 1205-6626 (print); 1918-1515 (web)
- OCLC no.: 819172465

Links
- Journal homepage; Online access

Experimental & Clinical Cardiology was an open access medical journal covering cardiology and heart health-related topics, including hypertension, myocardial ischemia, diabetes, and other cardiovascular diseases. It was published by Cardiology Academic Press, which is on Jeffrey Beall's list of predatory publishers. According to the Journal Citation Reports, the journal had in 2013 impact factor of 0.758.

== Controversy ==
Until 2013, the journal was published by Pulsus Group, which sold the journal to Cardiology Academic Press. Since then, the journal has been accused of publishing manuscripts without adequate review, as evidenced by the acceptance for publication of a fake manuscript submitted by journalists from the Ottawa Citizen. The journal claims to be an official journal of the International Academy of Cardiovascular Sciences, but this organisation denies any connection with it.
