= St. Boniface Cathedral =

Catholic cathedral in Manitoba, Canada

- Cathedral-Basilica of St. Boniface
- Cathédrale-Basilique de Saint-Boniface
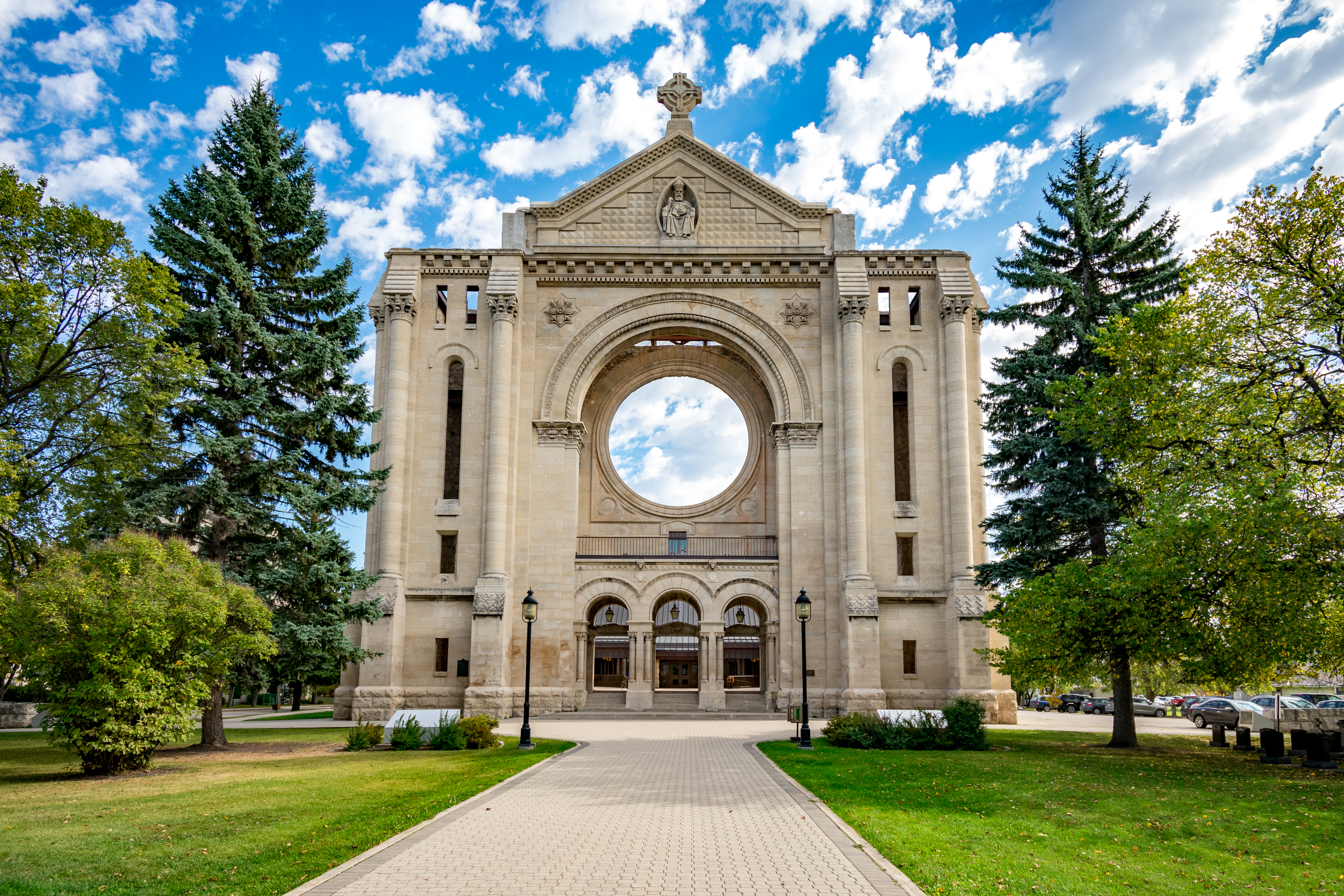
- St. Boniface Cathedral
- 49.8893°N 97.1220°W
- Location: Winnipeg, Manitoba
- Country: Canada
- Language: French
- Denomination: Catholic
- Sui iuris church: Latin Church
- Website: cathedralestboniface.ca

History
- Status: Cathedral
- Dedication: Saint Boniface

Administration
- Archdiocese: Saint Boniface
- Deanery: Urban French

Clergy
- Archbishop: Albert LeGatt
- Pastor: Germain Kpakafi

The Basilica of Saint Boniface (French: Cathédrale Saint-Boniface) is a Catholic cathedral in the St. Boniface ward of Winnipeg, Manitoba, Canada. It is an important building in Winnipeg, and is the principal church in the Archdiocese of Saint Boniface, serving the eastern part of Manitoba province as well as the local Franco-Manitoban community. The church sits in the centre of the city at 190 avenue de la Cathédrale. Before the fire on July 22, 1968, which destroyed the previous building on site, the church was a minor basilica. Pope Pius XII raised the shrine to the status of minor basilica via his decree Centum Amplius Abhinc on 10 June 1949. The decree was signed and notarized by Cardinal Carlo Grano.

The cathedral faces the Red River. In Verendrye Park is a statue of Pierre La Vérendrye by Joseph-Émile Brunet. Across the river is The Forks in Downtown Winnipeg.

== History ==
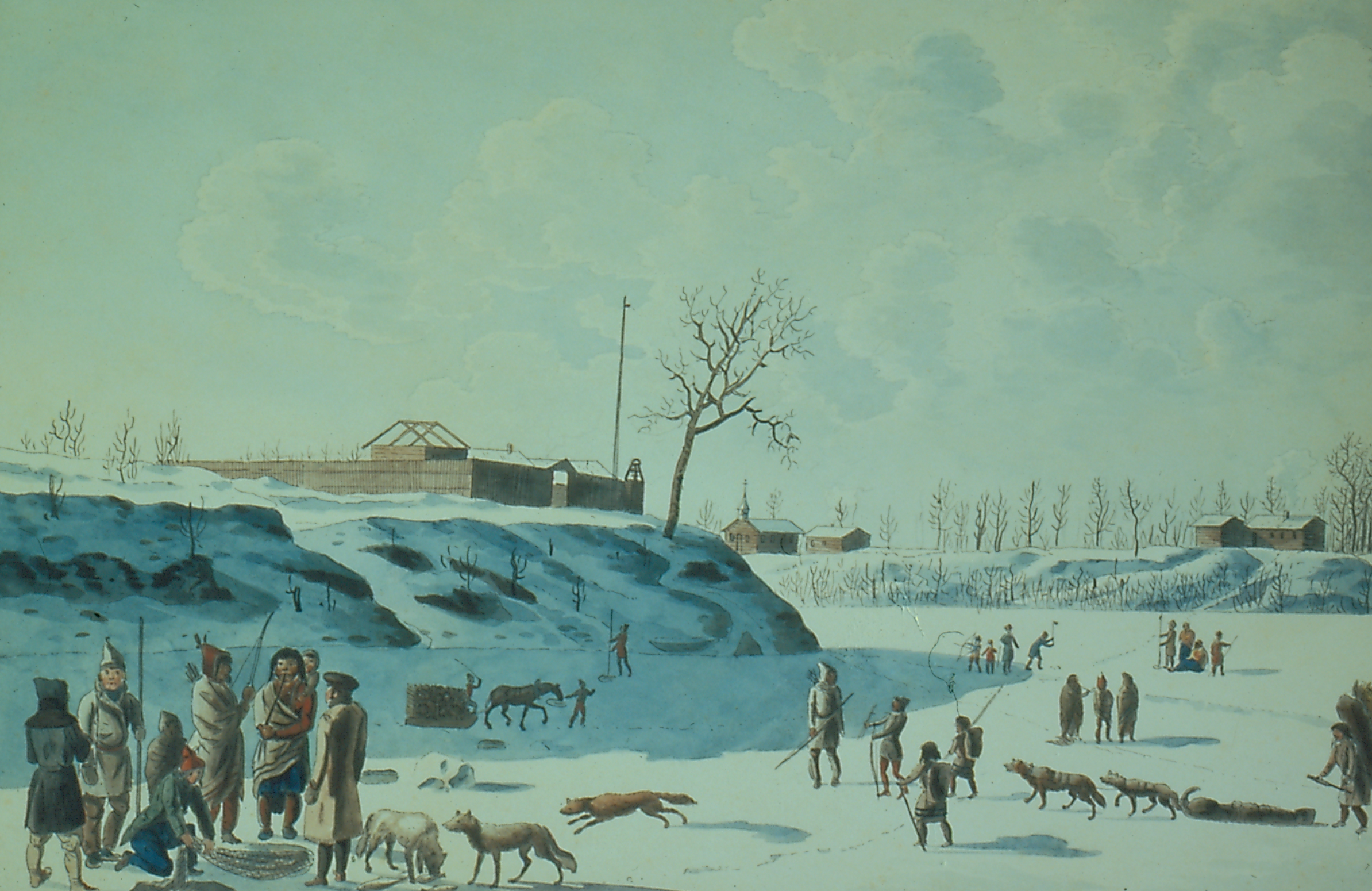
Second St. Boniface Church in the distance (1821)

In 1818, newly arrived Rev. Norbert Provencher and two colleagues constructed the first church on land on the east bank of the Red River donated by Hudson's Bay Company's Thomas Douglas, 5th Earl of Selkirk. The small log building measured 50 feet by 30 feet and served as chapel, residence and school. It was soon replaced with a larger building. In 1832, Provencher, now bishop, built the first cathedral. "The bells of St. Boniface" are mentioned in John Greenleaf Whittier's 1859 poem "The Red River Voyageur". "On December 17, 1891, Whittier's 84th birthday, Archbishop Taché had "the bells of the Roman mission" rung in the poet's honour."

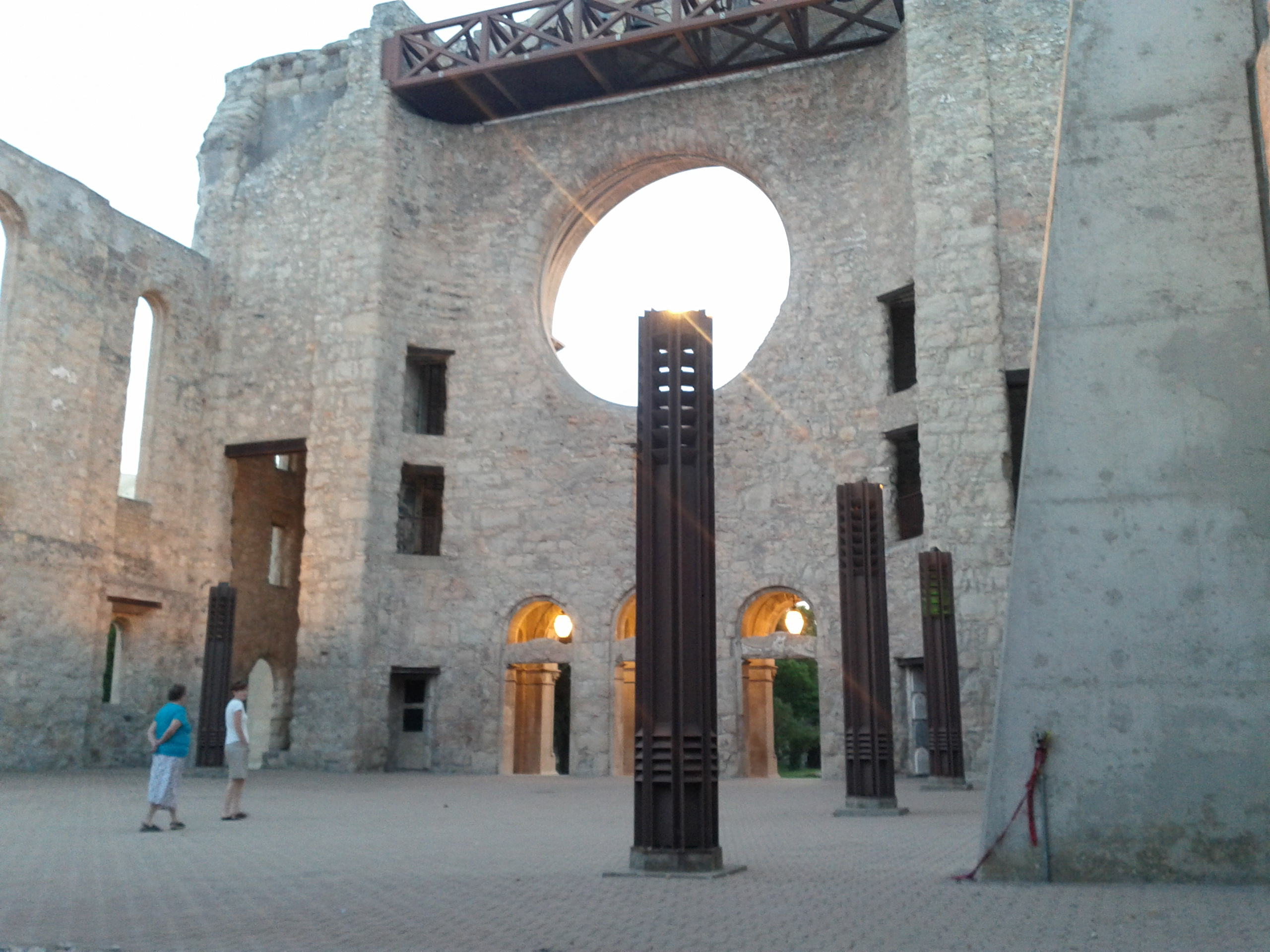
Between 1906 façade and back of new cathedral

On December 14, 1860, a fire destroyed "Provencher's cathedral". In 1862, Bishop Taché went to Quebec to raise funds to rebuild the cathedral in stone. This second cathedral was somewhat smaller; the bell tower was completed eight years later.

Between 1888 and 1906, the number of Catholics in St. Boniface had increased from 2,154 to 4,615, almost all of them of French heritage. By 1900, St. Boniface was the fifth-largest city in the West and needed a larger cathedral. Local contractors Senecal and Smith were engaged to build a new cathedral to plans by Montreal architect Jean-Omer Marchand. On August 15, 1906, Monsignor Louis-Philippe Adélard Langevin dedicated the cathedral, which became one of the most imposing churches in Western Canada.

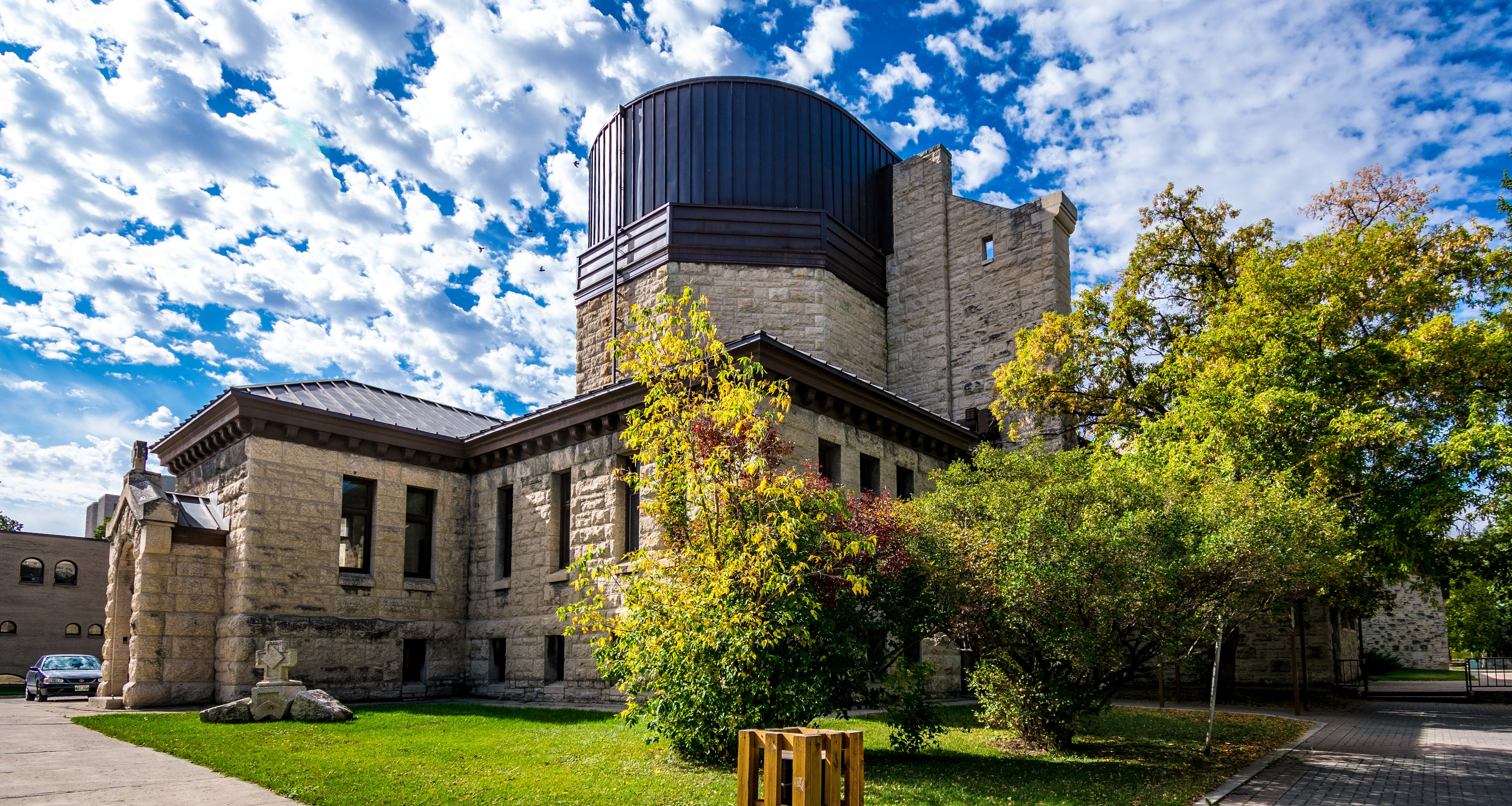
In 1972, a cathedral was built incorporating the back wall of the 1906 cathedral.

On Monday, July 22, 1968, the 1906 cathedral was damaged by a fire which destroyed many of the structure's features and contents including the rose window, vestments, 1860 bells, and parish records. Only the façade, sacristy, and the walls of the old church remained. In 1972, a new, smaller cathedral, designed by Étienne Gaboury and Denis Lussier, was built behind the 1906 façade.

The Institute for stained glass in Canada has documented the stained glass at St. Boniface Cathedral.

== Cathedral cemetery ==
The remains of Chief One Arrow (c. 1815 - 1886), who died on April 25, 1886, were interred at the cemetery from his death until August 2007, when his body was exhumed and sent to One Arrow First Nation in Saskatchewan.

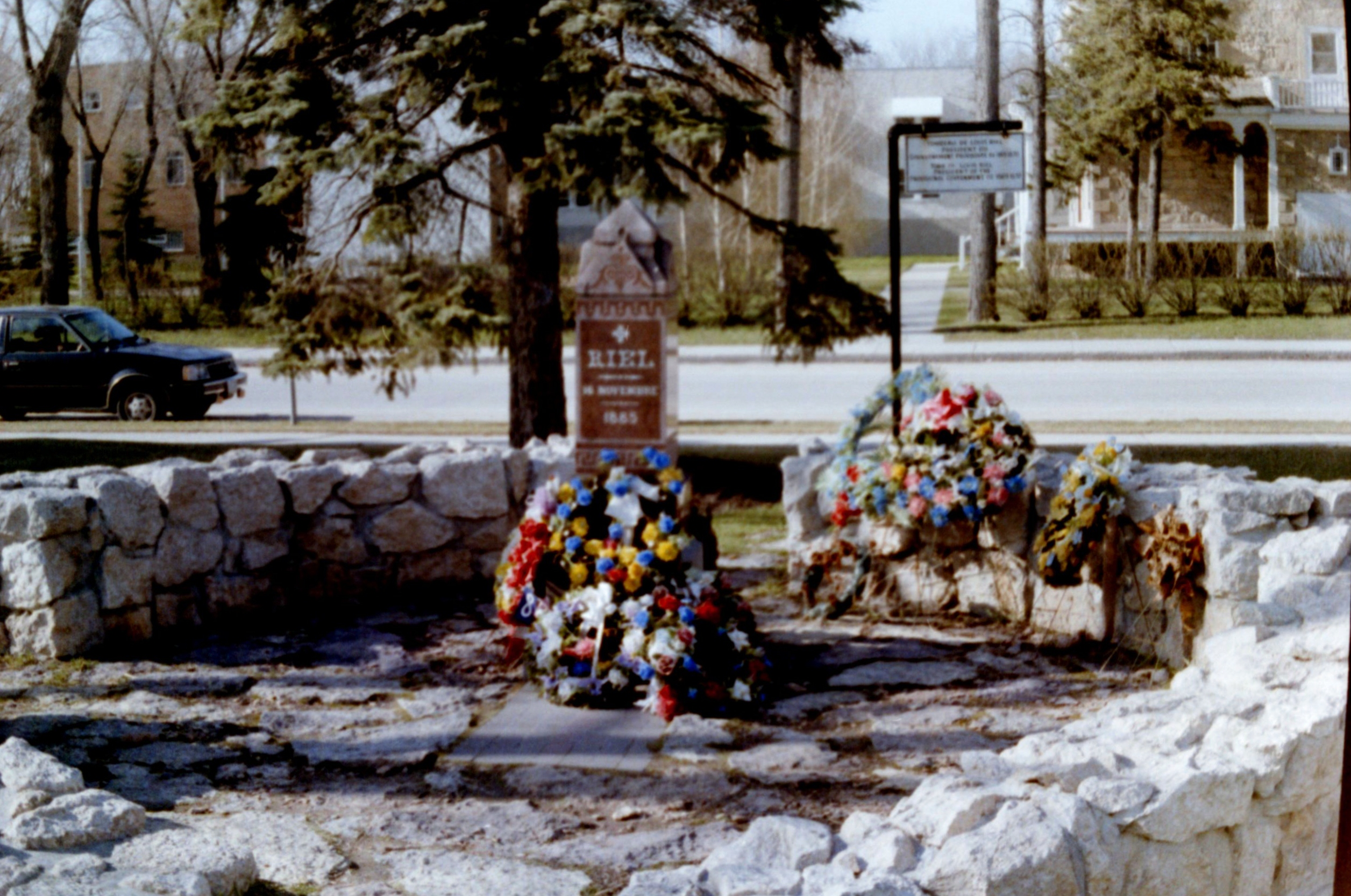
Headstone for Louis Riel at the cathedral's cemetery.

Other notable people buried in the cathedral cemetery include:

- Fr. Jean-Pierre Aulneau (1705–1736)
- Jean Baptiste de La Vérendrye (1713–1736)
- Louis Riel (1844–1885)
- Louis Riel, Sr. (1817–1864)
- John Rowand III (1812–1865)
- Ambroise-Dydime Lépine (1840–1923)
- Jean-Baptiste Lagimodière (1778–1855)
- Marie-Anne Gaboury (1780–1875)
- Norbert Provencher (1787–1853)
- Vital-Justin Grandin (1829–1902)
- Rosario Couture (1905–1986)

== See also ==
- Archdiocese of Saint Boniface
- Cathedral Church of Saint John
- Holy Trinity Anglican Church
- List of historic places in Winnipeg
- Westminster United Church
