= Adélard Langevin =

Canadian Oblate priest (1855–1915)

Louis Philippe Adélard Langevin
- Archbishop of Saint-Boniface
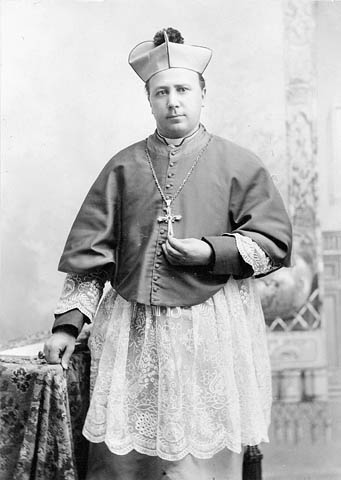
- Adélard Langevin, 1895
- Archdiocese: Saint Boniface
- Installed: 1895
- Term ended: 1915
- Predecessor: Alexandre-Antonin Taché
- Successor: Arthur Béliveau

Personal details
- Born: August 23, 1855 Saint-Isidore, near La Prairie, Lower Canada
- Died: June 15, 1915 (aged 59) Montreal, Quebec

Louis Philippe Adélard Langevin (French pronunciation: [lwi filip adelaʁ lɑ̃ʒvɛ̃]; August 23, 1855 – June 15, 1915) was a Canadian Oblate priest and Archbishop of Saint-Boniface. He founded the La Liberté newspaper published in Manitoba on May 20, 1913. He was the energetic leader of the Catholic struggle to restore language and religious rights in the Manitoba Schools Question.

== Life ==
Langevin was born in Saint-Isidore, near La Prairie, Lower Canada, one of sixteen children of François-Théophile and Marie-Paméla Racicot Langevin. In 1875 he entered the Sulpician Grand Séminaire de Montréal and then studied at Jesuit St. Mary's College, the English branch of the Collège Sainte-Marie de Montréal.

Langevin joined the Missionary Oblates of Mary Immaculate at Lachinein 1881, and was ordained a priest the following year by Monsignor Édouard-Charles Fabre, Bishop of Montreal. After his ordination, Langevin preached retreats and temperance crusades throughout the diocese of Montreal. He contracted smallpox during the epidemic of 1885.

Langevin became director of the major seminary in Ottawa and taught moral theology at the University of Ottawa. In 1890, he was appointed vice-dean of the Faculty of Theology at the University of Ottawa. He went to Paris to attended the general chapter of the Oblates.

In 1892 he received the degree of D.D. That same year, fellow Oblate Alexandre-Antonin Taché, Archbishop of Saint Boniface, requested Langevin be assigned to Manitoba as superior of the oblates in the archdiocese. He was also made rector of the English-speaking parish of St. Mary's in Winnipeg.

== Archbishop ==
Upon the death of Taché in June 1894, Langevin was named to succeed him as Archbishop of Saint Boniface. He was installed in 1895. During his episcopacy, Langevin was concerned with the question of the educational rights of Catholics on the Prairies after the abolition of the denominational school system in 1890. A defender of equality between French and English Canadians, Langevin had a number of confrontations with Anglophone Catholic leaders. He believed that the viability of Catholic culture in North America depended on both language and denominational instruction, and was not satisfied with the adoption of the Laurier-Greenway regulations in 1896, which allowed education in a language other than English, under certain conditions, and which authorized religious education in public schools after school hours.

Langevin believed that the new immigrants could become good Canadians while remaining faithful Catholics. He hoped that the new communities settling in the West could keep their language and their religion and fought for the diversity of cultures by offering new immigrants services in their language. To this end, Holy Ghost Parish was established in North Winnipeg to serve Polish Catholics. In 1904, St. Joseph's was founded for the German Catholics. The French church of Sacré Coeur was dedicated in 1905 for former parishioners of St. Mary's. Langevin was unfamiliar with the Eastern rite, and thought that the many Ukrainian immigrants settling around Winnipeg would do better to adapt to the Rite of their new country. The Ukrainians were reluctant to take up the Latin rite, which to them was foreign. Around 1902, Oblate missioner Albert Lacombe had persuaded some Basilian Fathers to establish a mission at Beaver Lake in Alberta. Impressed with their work, Langevin wrote the Basilian superior requesting priests for the Ukrainians of Winnipeg. Two Basilian priests arrived by the end of 1903. Langevin built for them St. Nicholas Church and rectory. Members of the Sisters Servants of Mary Immaculate established a mission at St. Nicholas in 1905. In 1911, Langevin built them a school. The Apostolic Exarchate of Canada was established in 1912.

He promoted the establishment of around twenty religious communities in its archdiocese. In 1898, Langevin asked the Soeurs de Misericorde from Montreal to assist unwed mothers. They opened, in 1900, a maternity hospital which later developed into Misericordia Health Centre.

In 1902, he co-founded the Société historique de Saint-Boniface and the Les Cloches de Saint-Boniface.

He died at Montreal on June 16, 1915 and was buried in the St. Boniface Cathedral Cemetery.

== Legacy ==
The Rue Langevin in the Saint-Boniface area of Winnipeg is named for him.

== Sources ==
- "Adélard Langevin". Dictionary of Canadian Biography (online ed.). University of Toronto Press. 1979–2016.
- Stephen T. Rusak. "ADÉLARD LANGEVIN AND THE RESTORATION OF MINORITY EDUCATIONAL RIGHTS IN CANADA," Paedagogica Historica: International Journal of the History of Education, (1984) 25:1, 197-224, DOI:10.1080/0030923850250109 online
