= Provencher Bridge =

Provencher Bridge Pont Provencher
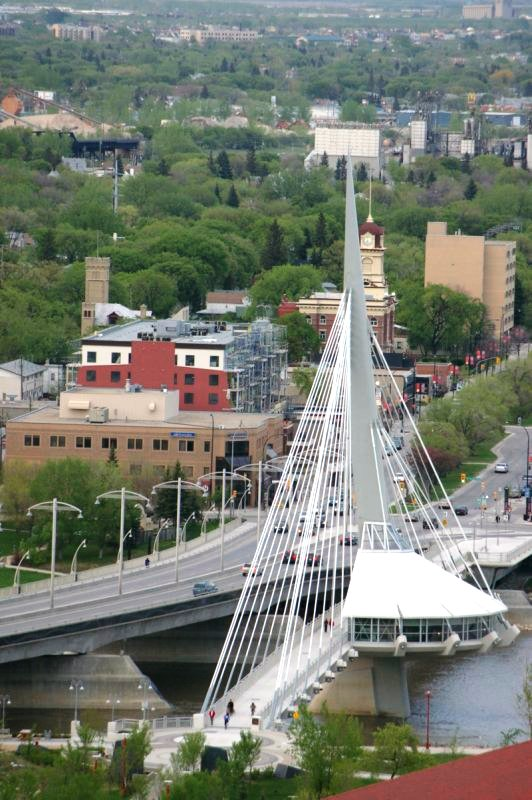
- Esplanade Riel with the Provencher vehicular bridge to the left
- Coordinates: 49°53′27.6″N 97°7′38.0″W
- Carries: Motor vehicles (vehicular bridge); Pedestrians (Esplanade Riel)
- Crosses: Red River
- Locale: Winnipeg, Manitoba, Canada
- Named for: Provencher Boulevard
- Owner: City of Winnipeg
- Preceded by: Broadway Bridge; Provencher Bridge (1918-2001)

Characteristics
- Total length: 280 metres (920 ft)
- Longest span: 5
- No. of lanes: 4

History
- Architect: Gaboury Prfontaine Perry
- Engineering design by: Wardrop Engineering
- Constructed by: M.D. Steele Construction
- Construction start: 2001
- Construction end: September 2003; 23 years ago

Location
- Interactive map of Provencher Bridge

The Provencher Bridge (French: Pont Provencher) is a set of paired bridges — a four-lane vehicular bridge and a suspended pedestrian bridge (called Esplanade Riel) — across the Red River in Winnipeg, Manitoba, Canada.

The bridge links downtown Winnipeg and The Forks historic area with St. Boniface, a Winnipeg community across the Red River. It derived its name from the connecting Boulevard Provencher (Provencher Boulevard).

The vehicular bridge serves Route 57 and is a main connector from downtown Winnipeg to most of the eastern communities in Winnipeg. The speed limit on the bridge is 50 km/h (31 mph).

== Bridge history ==
There have been a total of three bridges (aka Red River Bridges), as well as a ferry, linking Winnipeg from the then-eastern end of Broadway with St. Boniface from the western end of Provencher Boulevard. The current-day Provencher Bridge succeeds the ferry and the previous two bridges.

=== Ferry ===
The first way of crossing the Red River was by the Notre Dame Street (Pioneer Avenue) ferry, linking Broadway on the west with Provencher Boulevard on the east. The ferry route was cancelled in 1882 with the opening of the Broadway Bridge. It sank on the Assiniboine River later that same year.

=== Broadway Bridge ===
Prior to the construction of the first Provencher Bridge was the Broadway Bridge (also known as the St. Boniface Bridge), which spanned the Red River and linked the cities of Winnipeg and St. Boniface by connecting Provencher Boulevard with Broadway.

Built by the joint-stock Assiniboine and Red River Bridge Company, a subsidiary of the Hudson's Bay Company, the Broadway Bridge replaced the Notre Dame Street (Pioneer Avenue) ferry as the first bridge to link Winnipeg to St. Boniface.

The Broadway Bridge was a simple iron truss structure, about 270 metres (900 ft) in length, consisting of five 43 metres (140 ft) stationary spans and one swing span. Known as a Pratt or Whipple truss bridge, the Broadway Bridge was designed by Edward Worrell Jarvis and constructed by C. W. Dean of Cleveland, Ohio.

Construction of this bridge began in 1881 and was opened to traffic on April 16, 1882, as a private toll bridge. Disaster struck three days later due to ice from annual Red River break-up, wiping away two spans of the bridge. The bridge remained closed until repairs were completed one year later.

In 1909, the City of St. Boniface bought the bridge for $59,000, and in 1912, city engineers recommended that a new bridge be built. Broadway Bridge remained in use until the completion of the construction of the Provencher Bridge in 1918, whereafter the Broadway Bridge was demolished.

=== First Provencher Bridge ===
In 1912, engineers of the City of St. Boniface recommended that the Broadway Bridge be replaced by a modern bridge with a refined aesthetic quality. A team of six engineers was recruited to oversee the construction project, and the cost would be split between St. Boniface (two thirds) and the City of Winnipeg (the remaining third).

The new viaduct, a double-leaf drawbridge designed by the Strauss Bascule Bridge Company of Chicago, began construction in 1913 or 1914. Construction was undertaken by MacDonald & McGoogan Company and the Dominion Bridge Co.

The new drawbridge along Provencher was opened in the summer of 1918, replacing the Broadway Bridge.

Instead of linking with Broadway, this new bridge was oriented slightly to the north; traffic crossing from the east was sent even further north, eventually connecting with Main Street about 500 metres from Broadway. Streetcars began operating on the bridge on December 3, 1925.

The second bridge was dismantled in 2001 for the opening of the third (current) bridge.

=== Current bridge ===
The third and current bridge consists of two paired bridges, a vehicular bridge and a pedestrian bridge (Esplanade Riel).

The City of Winnipeg decided to replace the 90-year old Provencher Bridge with a newer structure, following two and a half years of public consultation process. The bridge was designed by primary consultant Wardrop, and architectural design was provided by Guy Préfontaine and Étienne Gaboury.

To avoid disruptions the bridges were built in phases. The vehicular bridge was begun in 2001 and completed in 2003. The total project costs reached over $72.5 million for both bridges.

==== The vehicular bridge ====
The vehicular bridge's plan was originally designed to connect York and St. Mary Avenues to Provencher Boulevard, but it was cancelled in 1997. The lands for the St. Mary–York–Provencher connection were used for the construction of the Canadian Museum for Human Rights.

Construction of the vehicular bridge began on July 20, 2001, and was completed two years later, in September.

The vehicular bridge is slightly curved, branching off from a shared abutment on the east, unlike the old bridge which was completely straight and at a slight angle. The concrete vehicular bridge spans 280 metres (920 ft), and includes such features as rock-socketed, steel-jacketed concrete caissons constructed to high elevations which help avoid the issues of spring ice-break-ups and floods.

==== The pedestrian bridge ====
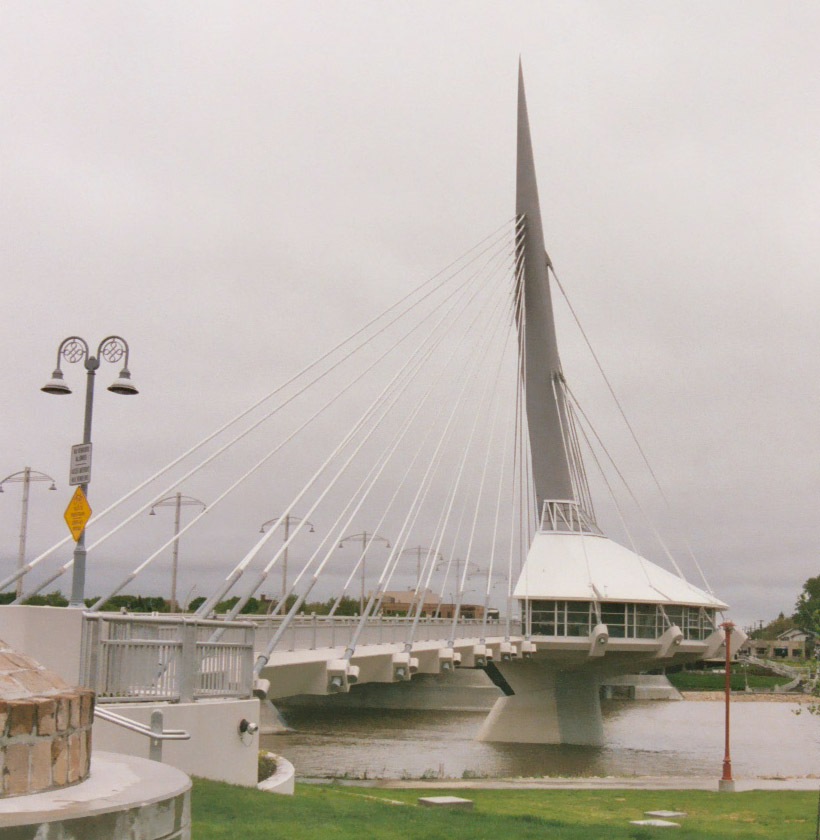
The Esplanade Riel, with the vehicular bridge in the background.

The Esplanade Riel (named for Louis Riel), the pedestrian portion of the Provencher Bridge, is a side-spar cable-stayed bridge sitting parallel to the vehicular bridge.

The construction of Esplanade Riel was added later to the Provencher Bridge project, in August 2002. Completed in 2003, the same year as the vehicular bridge, Esplanade Riel was officially opened in the summer of 2004. It was designed by Architects Guy Préfontaine and Étienne Gaboury, and Colin Douglas Stewart of Wardrop Engineering.

The bridge is 5 metres (16 ft) and follows the alignment of the historic Broadway Bridge.

The Esplanade Riel features a restaurant in the middle of the bridge. Originally operated by Salisbury House, the restaurant space was home to Chez Sophie Sur Le Pont from summer 2013 to February 2015. The bridge's next tenant, Mon Ami Louis, opened in July 2015 as an "approachable and eschewing the haute cuisine haughtiness of French dining."

== See also ==
- List of bridges in Canada
- List of bridges
