= Hammy =

Hammy may refer to:

== People ==
- Hammy Baker (1893-1937), Canadian ice hockey player
- Hammy Gillespie (1898-1973), Canadian professional ice hockey player
- George Howell (soldier) (1893–1964), Australian non-commissioned officer awarded the Victoria Cross
- Hammy Love (1895-1969), Australian cricketer
- Hammy McMillan (born 1963), Scottish curler
- Hammy McMillan Jr. (born 1992), Scottish curler

== Other uses ==
- Slang for Hamstring
- Overacting
- Hammy, a hyperactive squirrel character in the comic strip and film Over the Hedge
