= Symington Yard =

Rail yard in Winnipeg, Manitoba, Canada

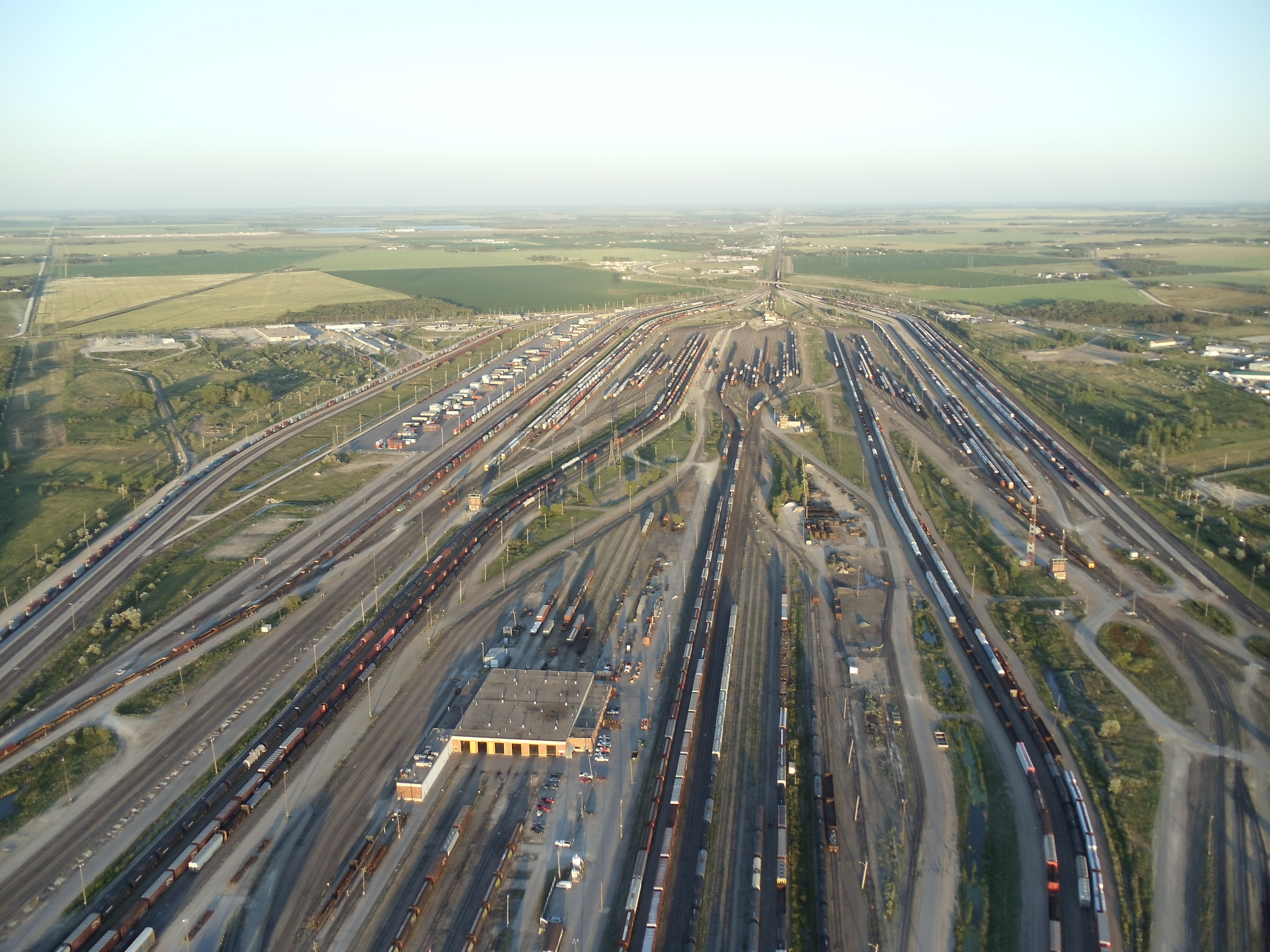
- Interactive map of Symington Yard

Location
- Location: 821 Lagimodiere Blvd, Saint Boniface, Winnipeg, Manitoba
- Coordinates: 49°51′55.6″N 97°01′41.8″W

Characteristics
- Owner: Canadian National Railway
- Depot code: 504
- Type: Diesel Freight

History
- Opened: 1961

Symington Yard is the largest rail classification yard of the Canadian National Railway, and one of the largest rail yards in the world. The intermodal facility is located next to the Windsor Park area of Winnipeg, Manitoba.

Built in 1962 to replace Transcona and Fort Rouge, and named for former CNR Director Herbert James Symington (1881–1965), it can store 7,000 cars and handles 3,000 cars per day.

== Yard incidents ==
- December 15, 1983 — two sets of locomotives collide in the Yard killing a CP engineer
- February 2, 1990 — eleven cars jackknifed and derailed at the bottom of the hump

== See also ==
- MacMillan Yard
