= Precious Blood Roman Catholic Church (Winnipeg) =

Precious Blood Church
- Precious Blood Roman Catholic Church
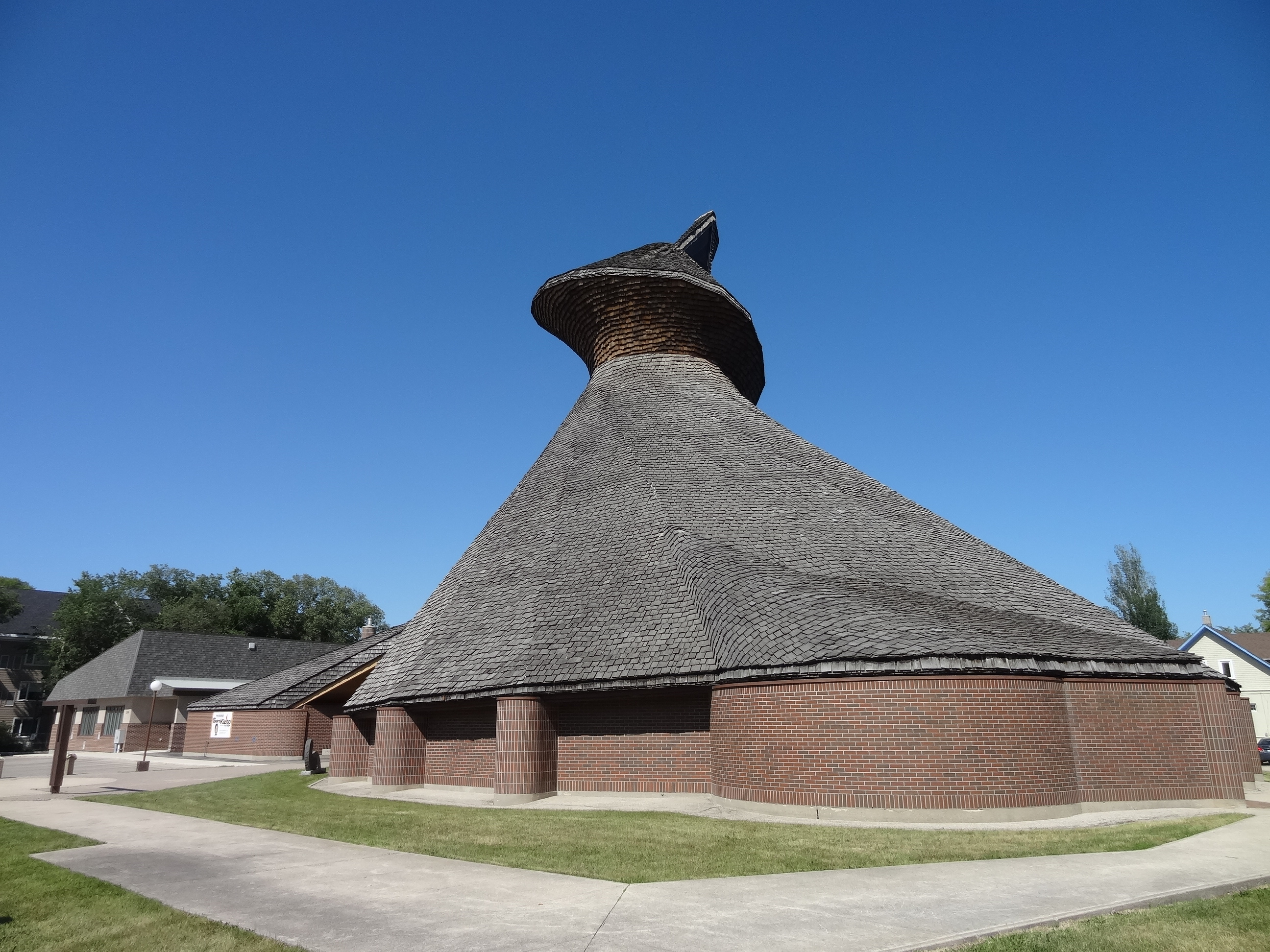
- Precious Blood Church
- 49.877606°N 97.119222°W
- Location: Winnipeg
- Country: Canada
- Denomination: Roman Catholic
- Website: https://www.paroisseduprecieuxsang.ca/sacraments.php

History
- Status: Active

Architecture
- Functional status: Parish church
- Architect: Étienne Gaboury
- Completed: 1968
- Construction cost: $397,000 Canadian Dollars

The Precious Blood Roman Catholic Church (French: Église du Précieux Sang) is a Roman Catholic parish located in the St. Boniface neighbourhood of Winnipeg, Canada. The church was designed by Canadian architect Étienne Gaboury. Construction of the building was completed in 1968. The church's tipi-inspired shape has been called Gaboury's most recognizable work by the Winnipeg Architecture Foundation.

== Architecture ==
=== Design ===
The Church is one of Étienne’s most notable designs as it has become a landmark in Canadian prairie architecture. The Design subtly relates its form to the tipi but has been modified to fit modern day liturgical requirements. The Church is an innovative design that has elements inspired by some of the decades most prominent architects, such as French architect Le Corbusier, who designed the Notre-Dame du Haut. It was at this time when Étienne’s focus on the paradigm shift of the church began to be seen in his publications “design for worship”. The church is considered a bold expression of postmodern architecture in Canada.

=== Interior space ===
The church has a number of supporting programs that extend beyond the main services of the church. Interior spaces include a multipurpose theatre, classrooms, offices meeting rooms, research rooms, eating areas with kitchen, and spaces for Sunday services. Interior space includes oak benches surrounding the altar in a semi circle configuration that follows the directives of the Second Vatican Council.

=== Structure ===
The church consists of two main structural components, the first being the brick and buttress foundation wall and base, followed by a wood roof. The base of the structure is made of brick, and a series of buttresses of various heights support the asymmetrical roof. Extending from the buttresses are 24 glulam beams that intertwine in double helix configuration and support the roof structure.

=== Roof ===
The roof of the structure contains an exterior wood sheathing with cedar- shake-clad. On the South side of the structure where the intersection of glulam’s meet, there is a narrow stained glass opening that allows light to pass into the altar.

== Events ==
The church provides a number of services to the community, including Sunday mass, baptisms, weddings, and various other Sacraments.

In addition to Sunday service, the church serves to host events and works with local schools to provide educational opportunities. The church accommodates up to 700 students and helps facilitate scholarships funds for students pursuing post-secondary studies.

Additionally, the church works with the local community to build volunteer groups and fundraisers that support events like missionary trips and charities.
