= Island Lakes, Winnipeg =

Neighbourhood in Winnipeg, Manitoba, Canada

Island Lakes
- Neighbourhood
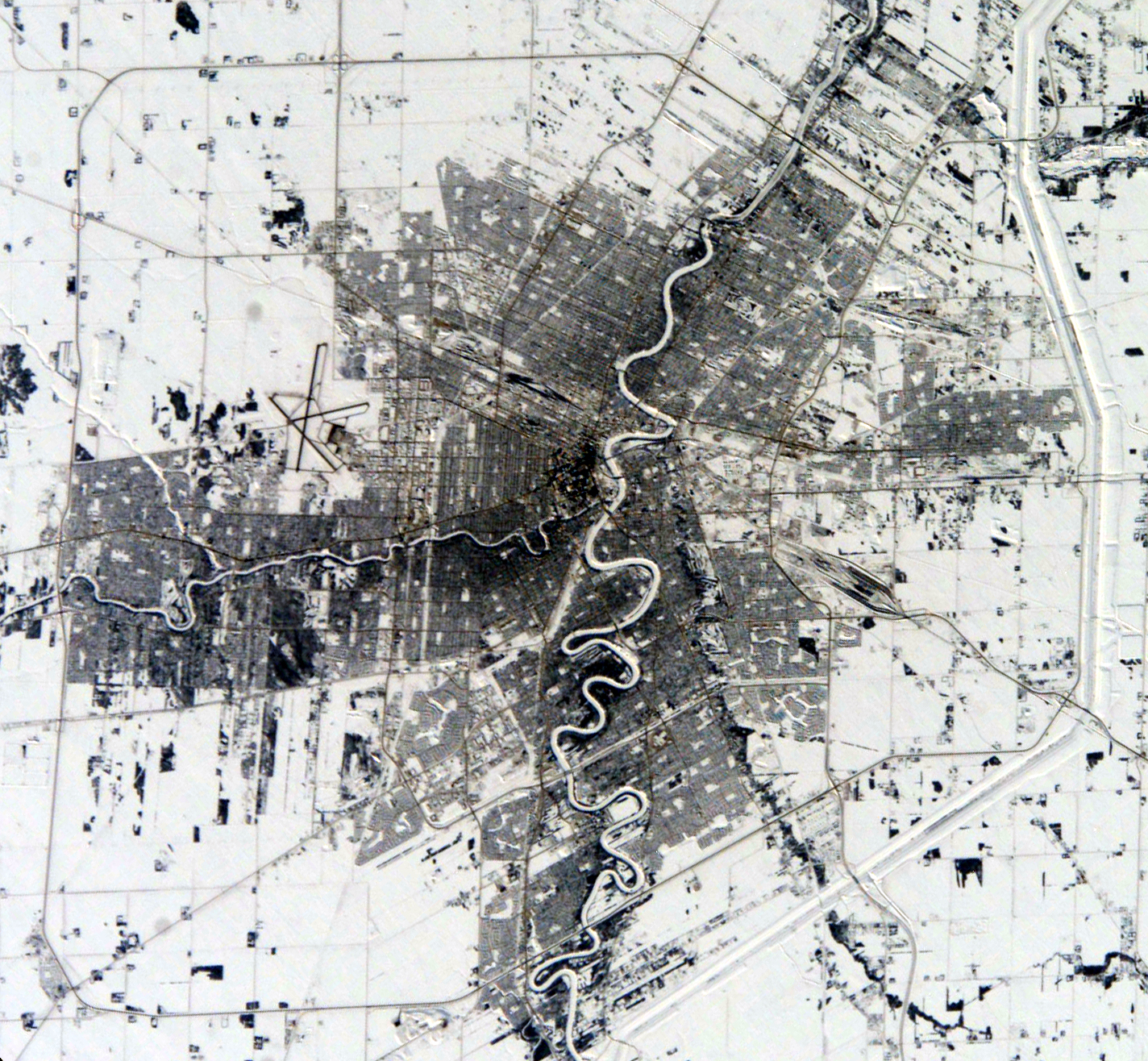
- Location within Winnipeg
- Coordinates: 49°50′10″N 97°03′37″W
- Country: Canada
- Province: Manitoba
- Established: 1981
- Founder: Novamet Development Corporation

Area
  - Neighbourhood: 2.5 km^{2} (0.97 sq mi)
  - Metro: 5,306.79 km^{2} (2,048.96 sq mi)
- Elevation: 231 m (758 ft)

Population (2016)
  - Neighbourhood: 7,525
  - Density: 3,000/km^{2} (7,800/sq mi)
  - Metro: 778,489
- Area codes: 204, 431

Island Lakes is a neighbourhood of Winnipeg, Manitoba, Canada, located in the ward of St. Boniface at the southeast corner of the city.

Developed by Novamet Development Corporation, the neighbourhood is set up in a curvilinear style typical of new suburbs. It is bordered by Abinojii Mikanah to the north, Perimeter Highway to the south, Lagimodiere Boulevard to the east, and the CPR Emerson railway tracks to the west.

As of the 2016 Census, the population of Island Lakes is 7,525.

== History ==
Construction began on the neighbourhood in 1981 and by 1985, 150 homes were built. Between 1986 and 1990, construction accelerated and an additional 880 homes were built.

== Demographics ==
As of the 2016 census, 24.1% of residents of Island Lakes identified as a visible minority (Filipino, south Asian, Black, Chinese, southeast Asian, Latin American, Arab, Korean, west Asian, Japanese, or another/multiple). 19.1% of residents were immigrants, with the majority coming from India, The Philippines, China, The United Kingdom, Vietnam, and Pakistan.
