= Esplanade Riel =

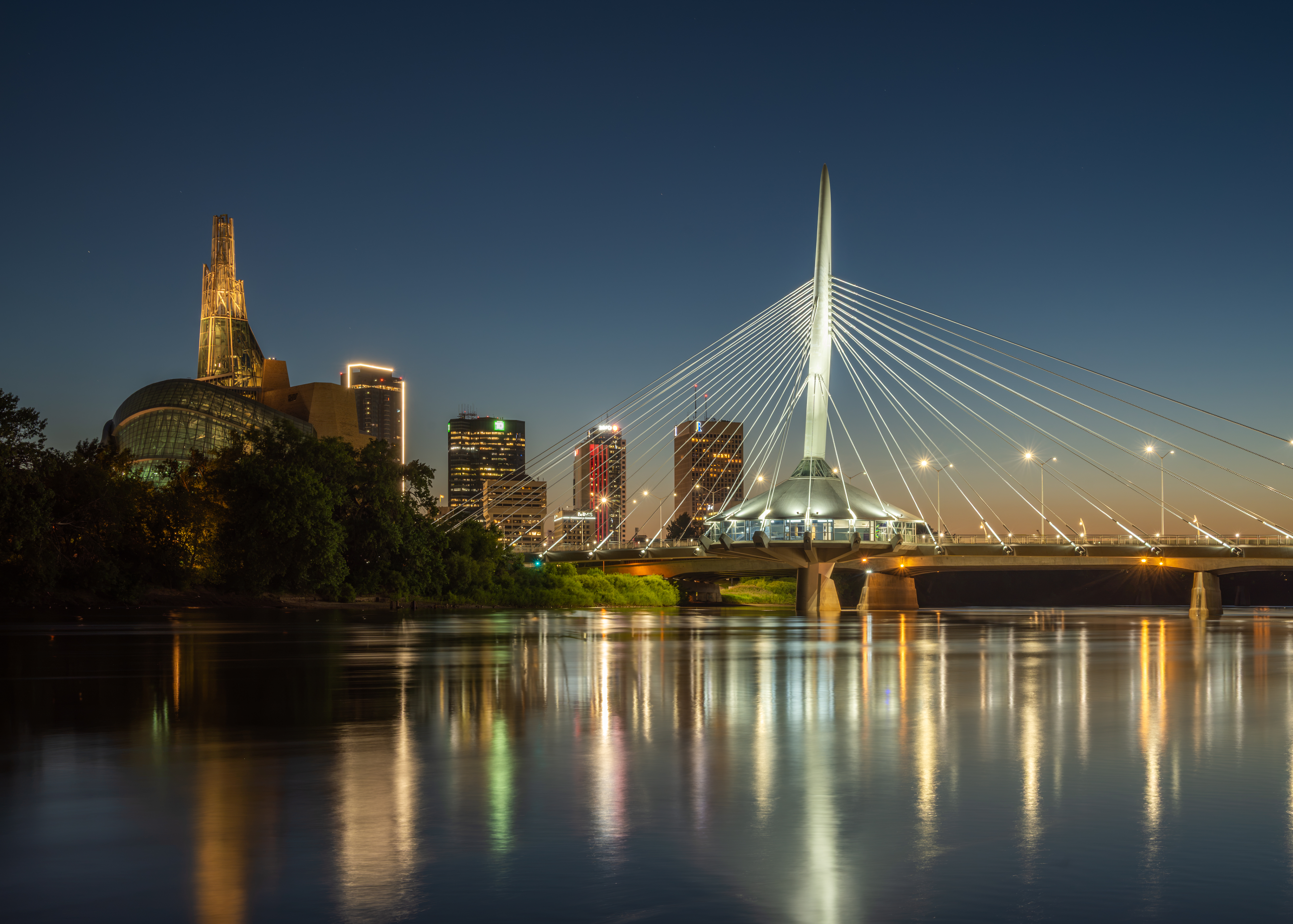
- Esplanade Riel pedestrian bridge at dusk
- Coordinates: 49°53′26.8″N 97°7′37.0″W
- Crosses: Red River
- Locale: Winnipeg, Manitoba, Canada
- Official name: Esplanade Riel
- Maintained by: City of Winnipeg

Characteristics
- Design: Side-spar cable-stayed bridge
- Total length: 250 metres (820 ft)
- Width: 7 metres (23 ft)
- Height: Top of the pylon is 57 metres (187 ft) above the bridge deck, and the bridge deck is about 11 metres (36 ft) above the water level.
- No. of spans: 2

History
- Designer: Guy Préfontaine and Étienne Gaboury
- Construction start: 2003
- Construction end: 2004

Location
- Interactive map of Esplanade Riel

Esplanade Riel is a pedestrian bridge located in Winnipeg, Manitoba. It was named in honour of Louis Riel.

It is a side-spar cable-stayed bridge which spans the Red River connecting downtown Winnipeg and The Forks historic area with St. Boniface; it is paired with a vehicular bridge, the Provencher Bridge. The bridge includes an architectural composite tower that is prestressed with a cantilevered and stayed semi-circular plaza area at the base of the tower. The plaza provides space for commercial activities and as well as a restaurant.

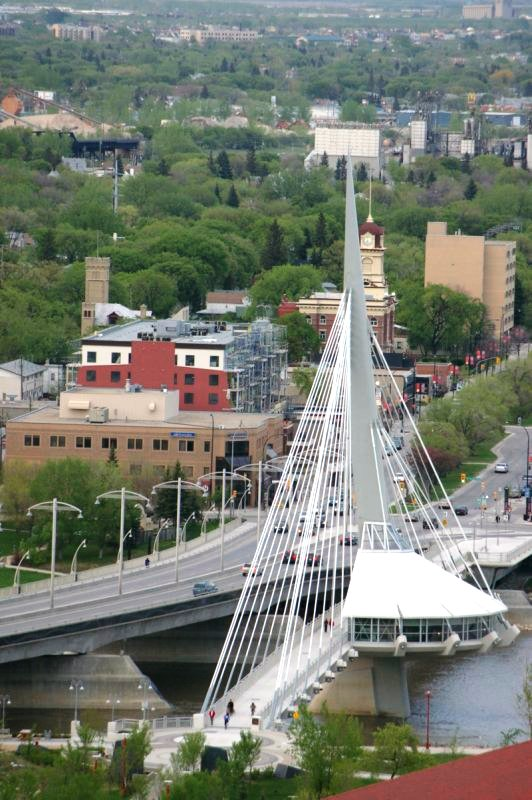
Esplanade Riel with the Provencher Bridge to the left

The Esplanade Riel was the only bridge with a restaurant in North America. Its first restaurant was a Salisbury House. Salisbury House is a chain restaurant local to Winnipeg. The next tenant was Chez Sophie sur le pont (on the bridge), which opened in the summer of 2013 and closed in February 2015. The Esplanade Riel has become a landmark and is used in many promotional materials.

Opened to foot traffic in 2003 and having a grand opening in the summer of 2004, the Esplanade Riel was co-designed by architects Guy Préfontaine and Étienne Gaboury of Gaboury Préfontaine Perry Architects Inc. The original drawing rests in the Engineering building of the University of Manitoba in Winnipeg.

The Esplanade Riel was built as part of the Provencher Twin Bridges project, a $72 million project which included a new four-lane divided vehicular bridge as well as new roadways and sidewalks linking the bridges to Downtown Winnipeg and Waterfront Drive.

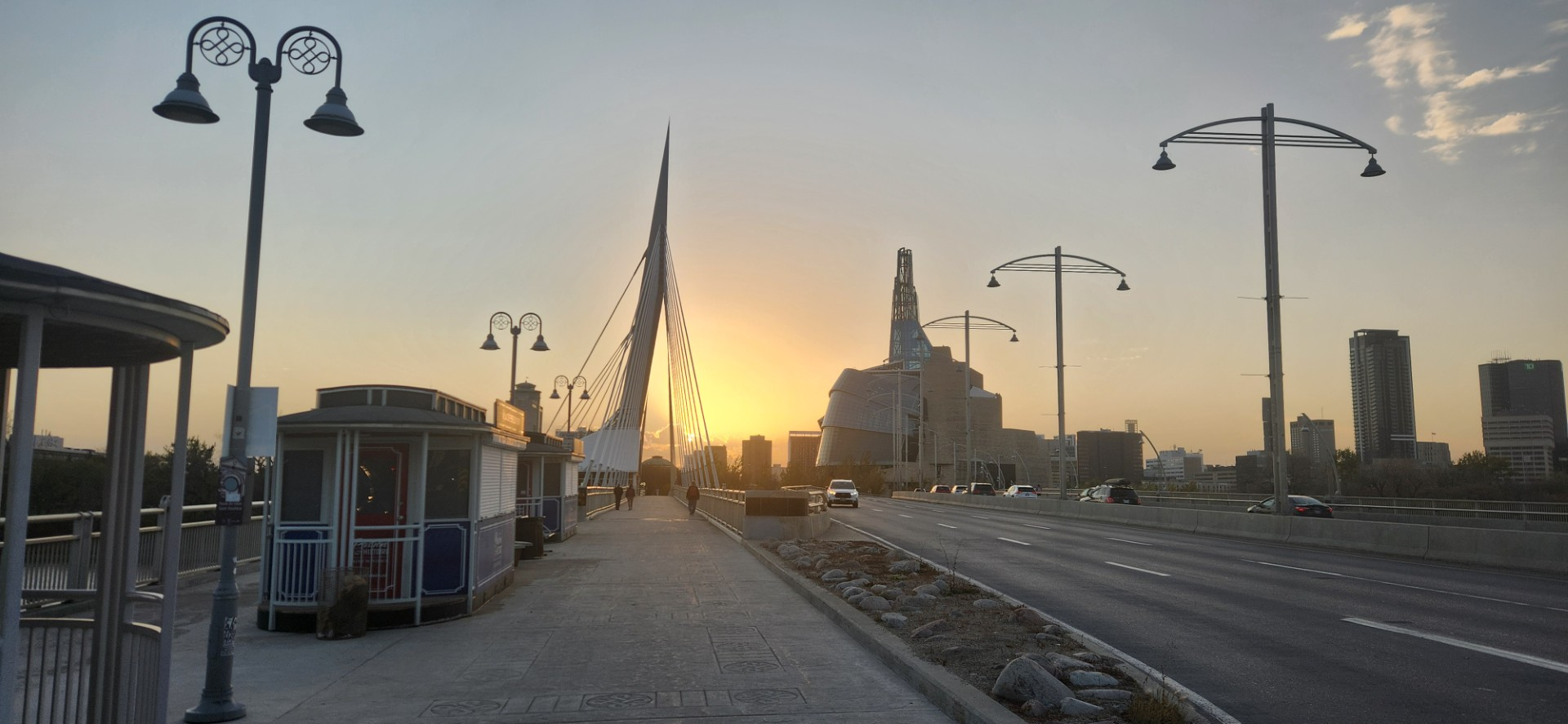
Esplanade Riel at Sunset

In January 2013 the City of Winnipeg terminated the lease with Salisbury House and in March the city approved a five-year lease agreement with the French restaurant Chez Sophie sur le pont. The original Chez Sophie, founded in 2005, is located on Avenue de la Cathedrale. The restaurants are operated by Stephane and Sophie Wild, who are from the Alsace region of France. Chez Sophie closed on February 2, 2015.

Mon Ami Louis opened as the new tenant in July 2015, serving more "approachable" fare, as opposed to haute cuisine. It closed in 2020.
