= Hammy Gillespie =

Canadian ice hockey player

- Born: August 23, 1898 Winnipeg, Manitoba, Canada
- Died: January 6, 1973 (aged 74) Saskatoon, Saskatchewan, Canada
- Height: 5 ft 10 in (178 cm)
- Weight: 170 lb (77 kg; 12 st 2 lb)
- Position: Defence
- Shot: Right
- Played for: Edmonton Eskimos
- Playing career: 1918–1921

Donald Stewart "Hammy" Gillespie (August 23, 1898 – January 6, 1973) was a Canadian professional ice hockey player. He played for the Edmonton Eskimos in the Western Canada Hockey League in the 1921–22 season. Previously, he also played with Selkirk of the Manitoba Hockey Association. He died suddenly at Saskatoon, Saskatchewan in 1973. He was buried at Woodlawn Cemetery in the same city.
