= Windsor Park, Winnipeg =

Neighbourhood in Winnipeg, Manitoba, Canada

Coordinates: 49°51′49″N 97°04′28″W

Windsor Park is a neighborhood in the southeastern part of St. Boniface, a neighbourhood of Winnipeg, Manitoba, Canada. It is bordered by Marion Street on the north, Archibald Street on the west, Lagimodière Boulevard on the east, and Fermor Avenue on the south. Its main thoroughfares include Autumnwood Drive, Drake Boulevard, Cottonwood Road, and Maginot Street.

Windsor Park was the first master-planned community in Winnipeg, the largest housing development of its kind in western Canada, and the second largest in the country during the mid-1950s. Most residents live in bungalows built in the 1950s and 1960s. Local public schools in the neighbourhood are part of the Louis Riel School Division.

== Places and culture ==
Recreation facilities include the Windsor Park Nordic Centre and Windsor Park Golf Course, which straddles the Seine River. Amenities in Windsor Park include convenience stores (Circle K, 7-Eleven), full-service gas station (Esso), grocery (IGA), and medical clinics. Windsor Park also includes several faith communities, including St. Bartholomew Anglican Church, St. Bernadette's Roman Catholic Church, Prince of Peace Lutheran Church, Ss-Martyrs-Canadiens Roman Catholic Church, and Windsor Park United Church.

== History ==
The development of Windsor Park began with John Henry Borger. The Borger family arrived from Russia in 1902, and by 1919, John and his father started a family-owned construction business, Henry Borger and Sons Ltd., of which John became the president in 1936. Later, in 1955, John formed Land Assembly and Development Co. (Ladco), an association of homebuilders brought together in response to the shortage of land in metropolitan Winnipeg. Each homebuilder had a share in the operation of the company, and first priority in acquiring lots in Ladco developments. In fall 1955, there were 38 member homebuilders in Ladco; Irvine B. Margolese and Co. Ltd., was the largest, representing seven different contractors.

Planning for Windsor Park had started as early as 1954. When a suitable plot of land was acquired, Ladco made public, in 1955, its plan to build 1,300 homes. They began clearing the 730-acre St. Boniface lot that September. On 19 January 1956, the company signed a contract with the City of St. Boniface to build 3,100 homes, a project valued at $45 million. Later that year, the president of Cottonwood Shopping Centres Ltd. announced the construction of a shopping centre at the heart of the development. Construction of the shopping centre began in the spring of 1957 and was completed by 1958. Costing a little over $1 million, the Cottonwood Shopping Centre included a large Safeway grocery market, a planned department store, medical centre, bank, beauty salon, clothing store, and bicycle repair shop.

The ribbon-cutting to open Windsor Park took place on 18 September 1956, and was attended by St. Boniface Mayor J. G. Van Belleghem, Ladco President J. Henry Borger, and A. W. Haag of the Winnipeg Home Builders’ Association. According to Van Belleghem, the development would encourage industrial growth on the east side of the city. Indeed, Windsor Park's development attracted industry, notably Canada Packers and Swift Canadian Co. Ltd., and contributed to St. Boniface becoming the 16th-largest industrial centre in Canada by 1958.

Windsor Park was the first master-planned community in Winnipeg, the largest housing development of its kind in western Canada, and the second largest in the country during the mid-1950s. A master plan created by Green Blankstein Russell and Associates (GBR) of Winnipeg called for 3,041 homes of all types, including duplexes and apartments, creating accommodation for 13,000 to 15,000 people. Irvine B. Margolese and Co. Ltd., was responsible for the development of nearly 1,500 of these homes.
