= Hammy Baker =

Canadian ice hockey player (1893–1937)

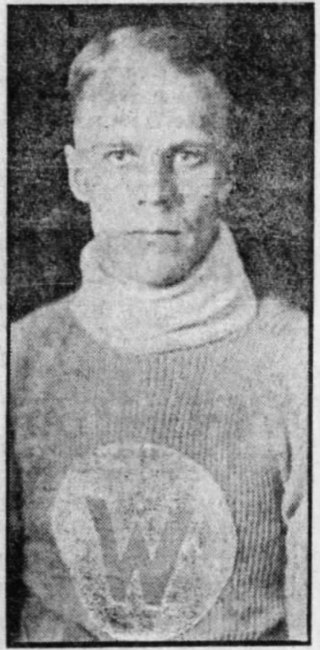
- Baker with the Calgary Wanderers in 1919–20
- Born: July 25, 1893 Winnipeg, Manitoba, Canada
- Died: January 21, 1937 (aged 43) Saint Boniface, Manitoba, Canada
- Height: 5 ft 9 in (175 cm)
- Weight: 164 lb (74 kg; 11 st 10 lb)
- Position: Right wing
- Shot: Right
- Played for: Calgary Tigers
- Playing career: 1908–1925

George Hamilton "Hammy" Baker (July 25, 1893 – January 21, 1937) was a Canadian professional ice hockey player. He played for the Calgary Tigers of the Western Canada Hockey League after serving in World War I. He also played for the Calgary Wanderers of the Big-4 League in Alberta and for the Winnipeg Victorias of the Manitoba Hockey Association.

An insurance man in later life, Baker died of suddenly of a heart attack a hospital in St. Boniface, Manitoba, after admitting himself due to "foot troubles". He was buried at St. John's Cemetery in St. Boniface.
