= St. Boniface, Winnipeg =

Coordinates: 49.900°N 97.100°W

St. Boniface Saint-Boniface
- Suburb
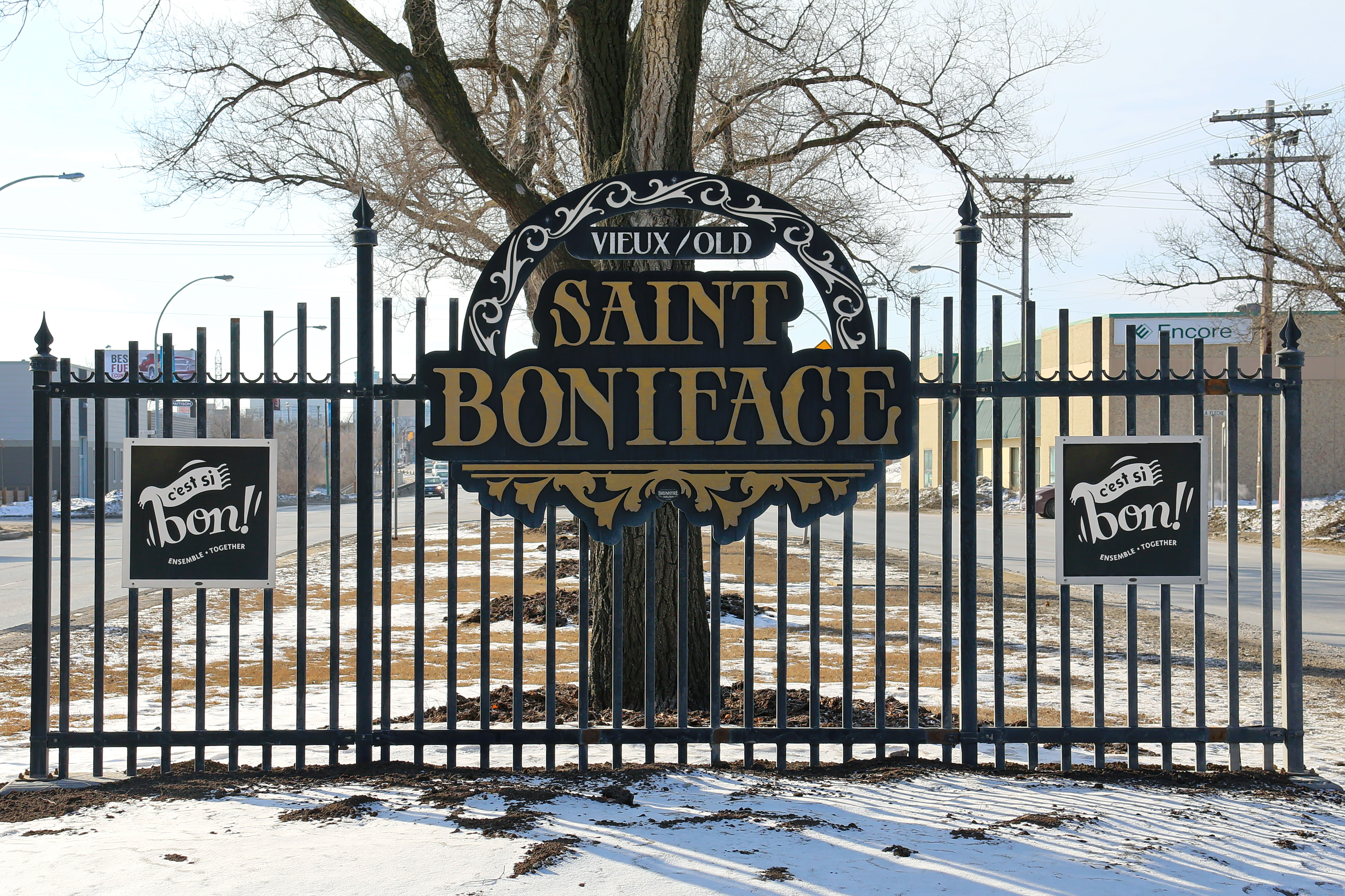
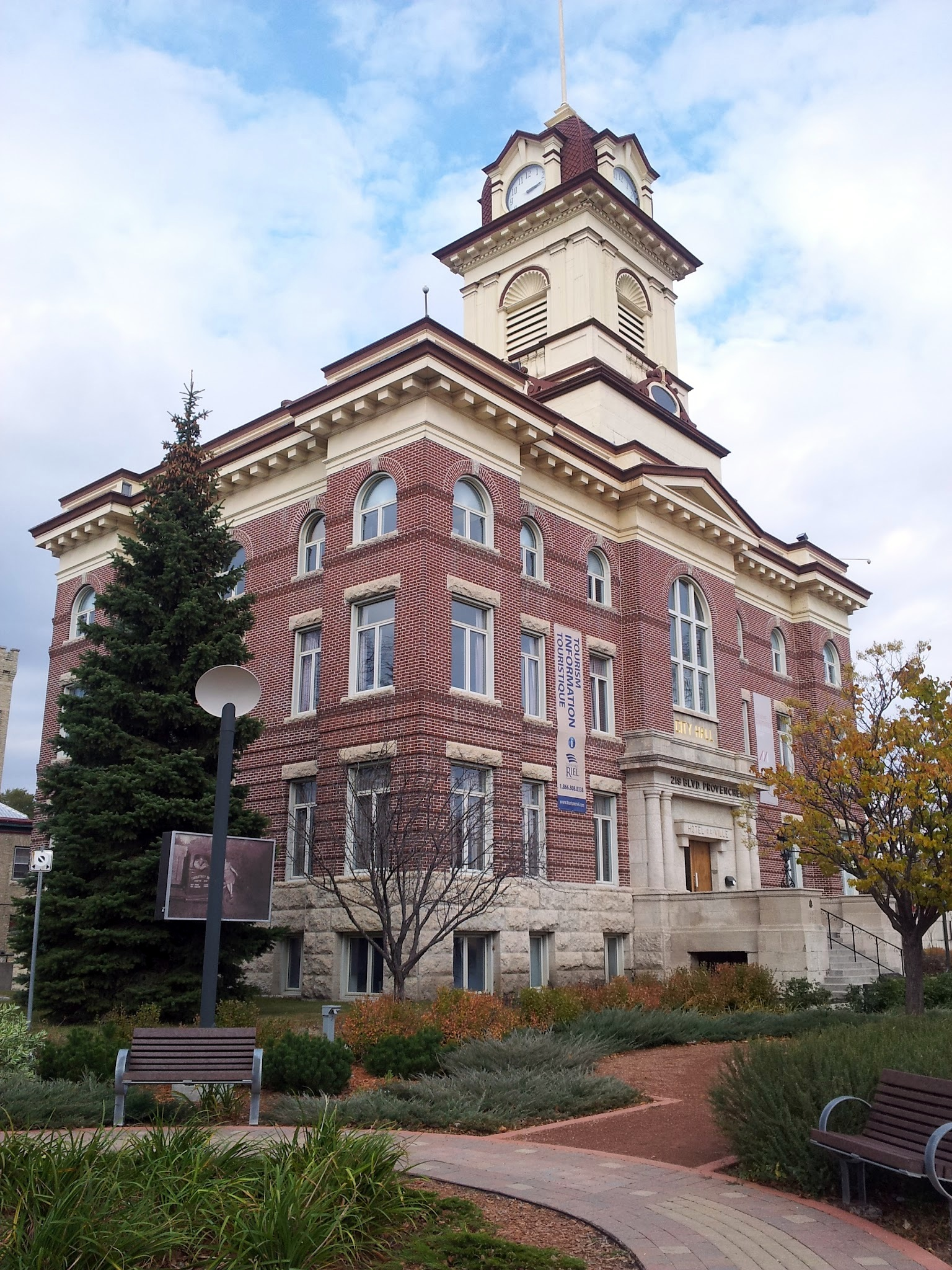
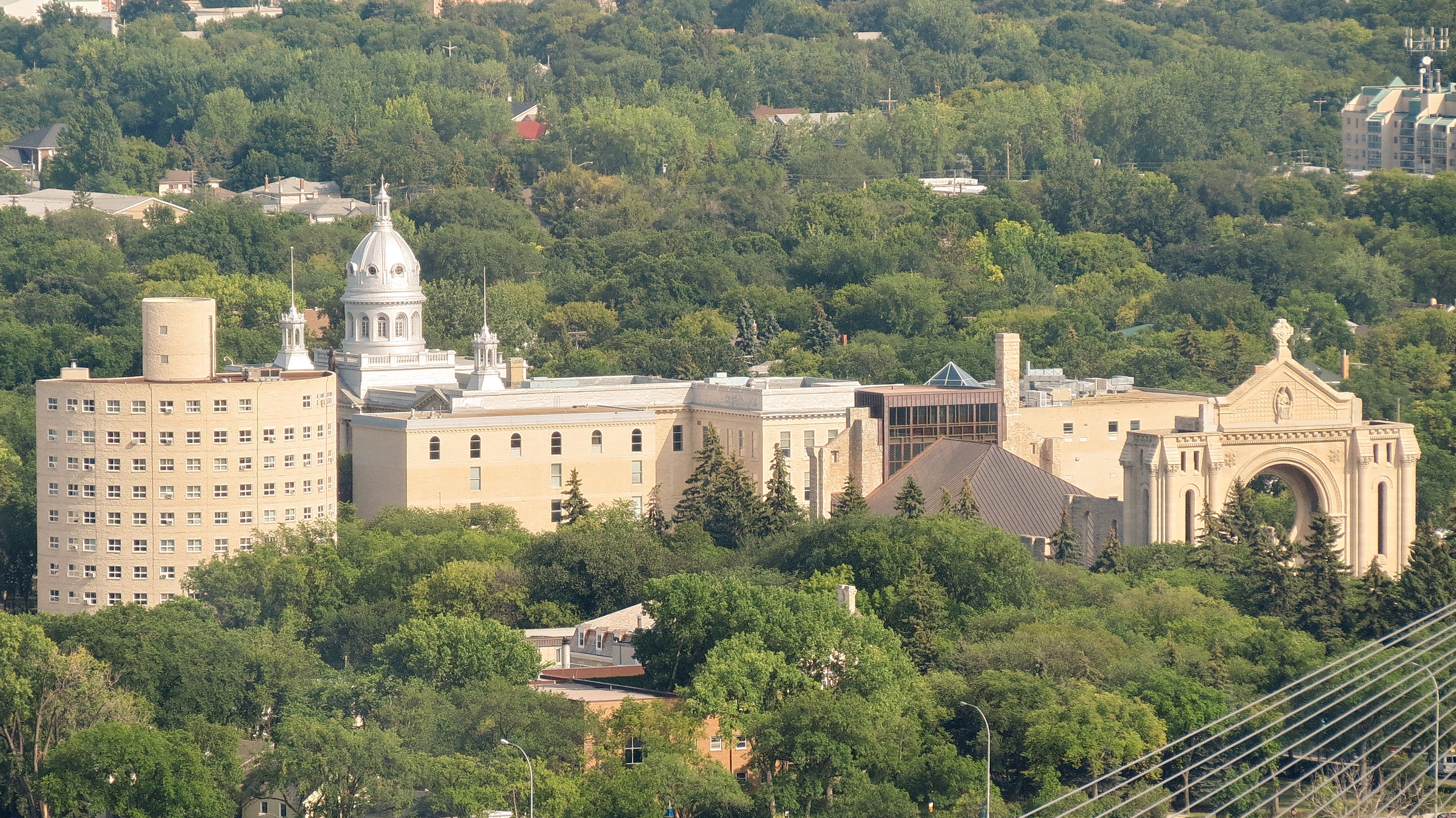
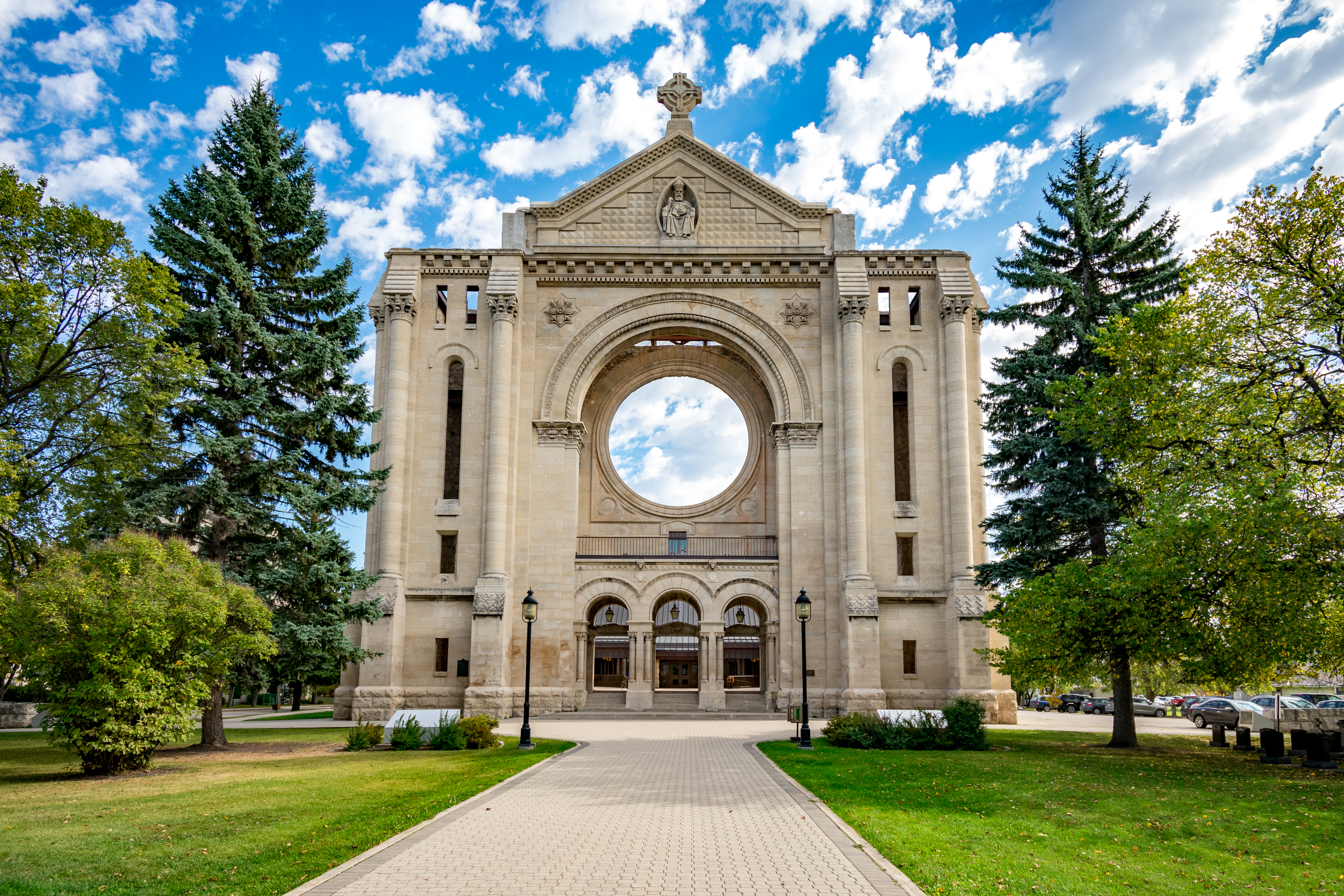
- Interactive map of St. Boniface
- Country: Canada
- Province: Manitoba
- City: Winnipeg
- Established: 1818
- Town: 1883
- City: 1908
- Named for: Saint Boniface

Area
  - Suburb: 24.455 km^{2} (9.442 sq mi)
  - Metro: 5,306.79 km^{2} (2,048.96 sq mi)
- Elevation: 234 m (768 ft)

Population (2016)
  - Suburb: 58,520
  - Density: 2,393/km^{2} (6,198/sq mi)
  - Metro: 778,489
- Time zone: UTC−5 (Central Daylight Time, officially called Manitoba Standard Time)
- Area codes: 204, 431, 584

St. Boniface (French: Saint-Boniface (Note: pronounced [sɛ̃ bɔnifas])) is a city ward and neighbourhood in Winnipeg, Manitoba, Canada. Along with being the centre of the Franco-Manitoban community, it ranks as the largest francophone community in Western Canada.

It features such landmarks as the St. Boniface Cathedral, Boulevard Provencher, the Provencher Bridge, Esplanade Riel, Saint Boniface Hospital, the Université de Saint-Boniface, and the Royal Canadian Mint.

The area covers much of eastern Winnipeg, including Old St. Boniface. It consists of the neighbourhoods of Norwood West, Norwood East, Stock Yards, Archwood, Central St. Boniface, Dufresne, Windsor Park, Niakwa Park, Niakwa Place, Southdale, Symington Yards, Southland Park, Royalwood, Fraipont, Sage Creek, and Island Lakes, among others, plus a large industrial area. The ward is represented by Matt Allard, a member of Winnipeg City Council, and also corresponds to the neighbourhood clusters of St. Boniface East, Southeast, and Central. The population was 58,520 according to the Canada 2016 Census.

== History ==
Federal census population history of St. Boniface
Year	Pop.	±%
1871	817	—
1881	1,283	+57.0%
1891	1,553	+21.0%
1901	2,019	+30.0%
1906	5,119	+153.5%
1911	7,483	+46.2%
1916	11,021	+47.3%
1921	12,821	+16.3%
1926	14,187	+10.7%
1931	16,305	+14.9%
1936	16,275	−0.2%
1941	18,157	+11.6%
1946	21,613	+19.0%
1951	26,342	+21.9%
1956	28,851	+9.5%
1961	37,600	+30.3%
1966	43,214	+14.9%
1971	46,714	+8.1%
Source: Statistics Canada

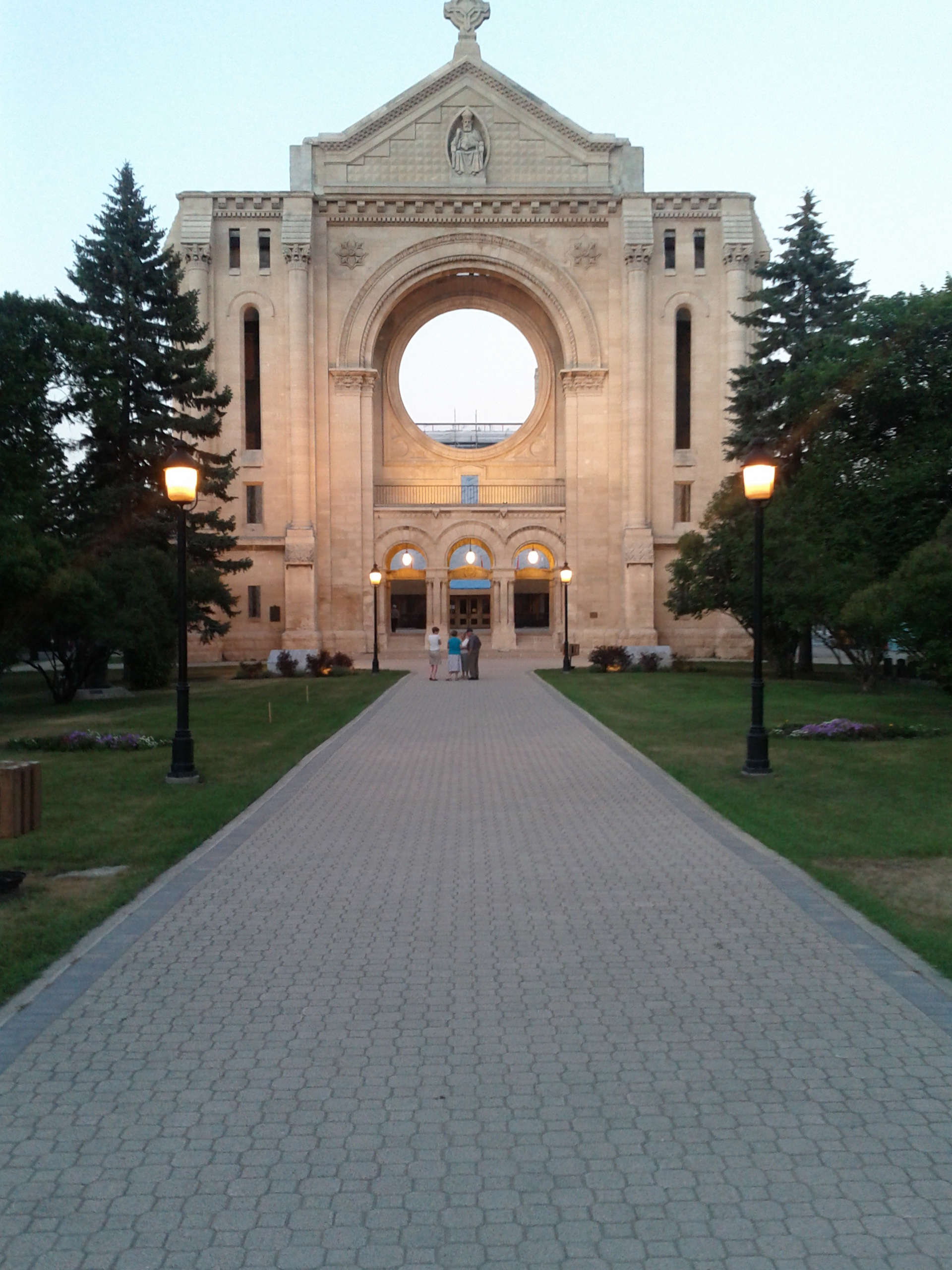
St Boniface Cathedral

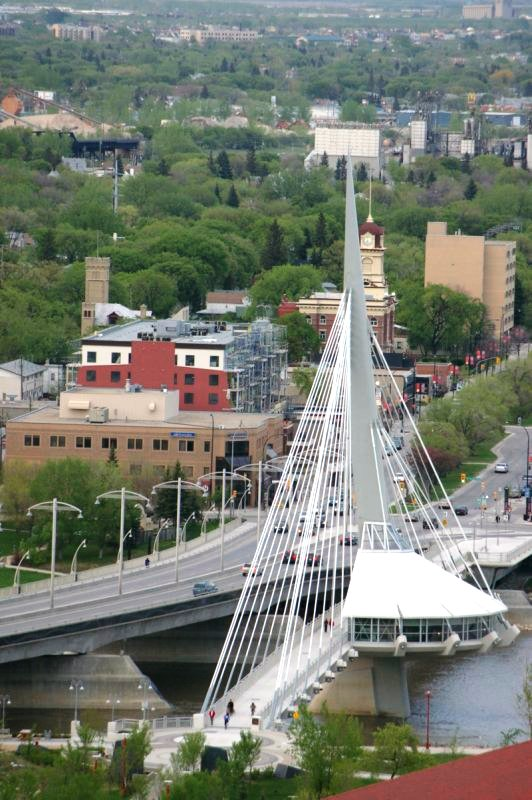
Esplanade Riel at the edge of St. Boniface

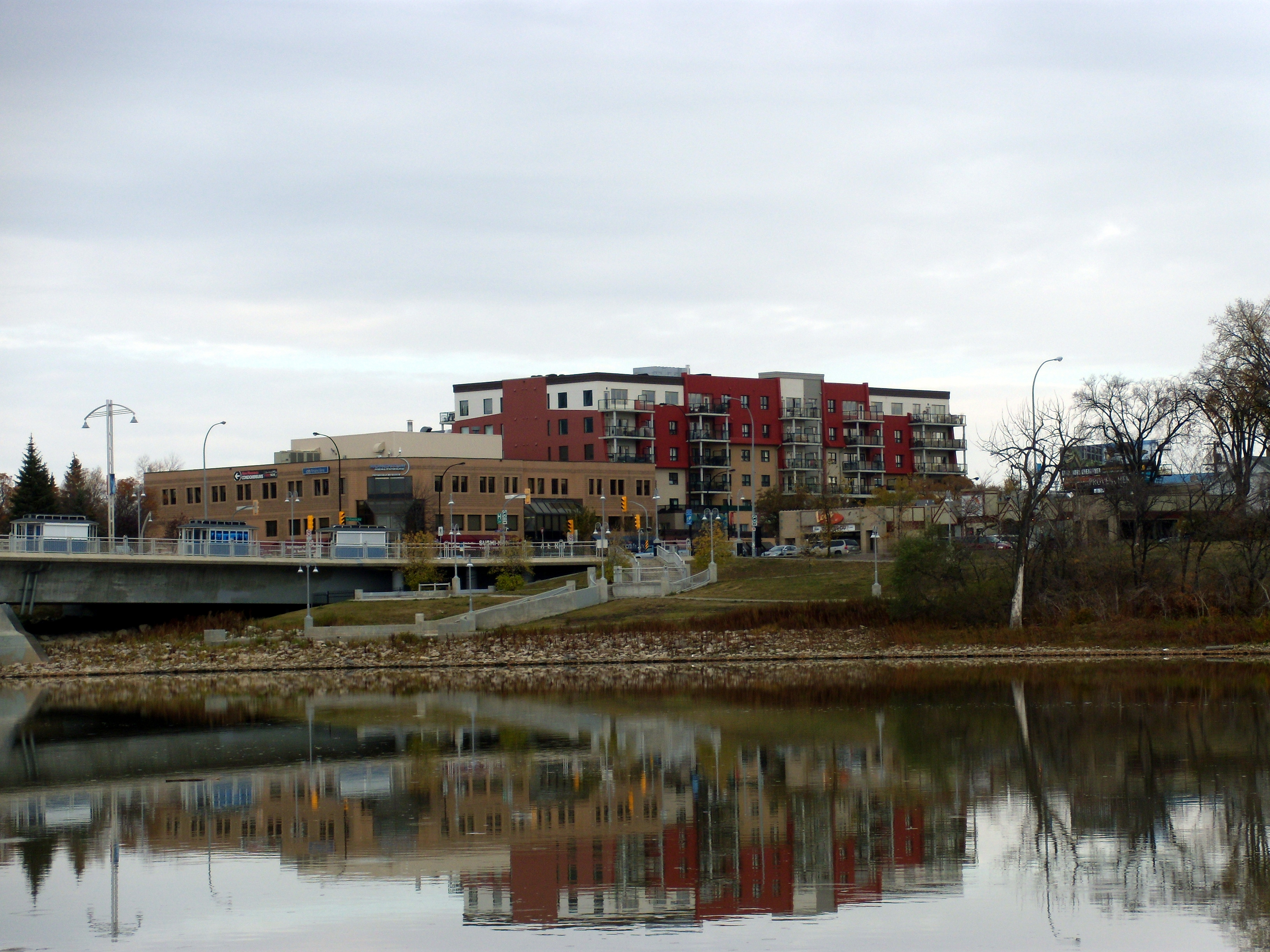
Condominiums in St. Boniface, Winnipeg

Succeeding cultures of indigenous peoples lived in the area for thousands of years before European exploration. It is an area of historic Ojibwe occupation.

Fur traders and European mercenaries hired by Thomas Douglas, Lord Selkirk, to protect his fledgling Red River Colony were among the area's first European settlers. With the founding of a Roman Catholic mission in 1818, St. Boniface began its role in Canadian religious, political and cultural history: as mother parish for many French settlements in Western Canada; as the birthplace of Louis Riel and fellow Métis who struggled to obtain favourable terms for Manitoba's entry into Confederation; and as a focus of resistance to controversial 1890 legislation to alter Manitoba's school system and abolish French as an official language in the province (see Manitoba Schools Question).

French-speaking religious orders, including the Sisters of Charity of Montreal (better known as the Grey Nuns), who arrived in 1844, founded the early educational, cultural and social-service institutions, such as St. Boniface Hospital, the first in Western Canada. Early French-speaking missionary Catholic priests in the region founded the Collège de Saint-Boniface (dating to 1818) to teach Latin and general humanities to the local boys; it is now the Université de Saint-Boniface.

St. Boniface was incorporated as a town in 1883 and as a city in 1908.

The early economy was oriented to agriculture. Industrialization arrived in the early 20th century. The 165-acre (67 ha) Union Stockyards, developed 1912–13, became the largest livestock exchange in Canada and a centre of the meat-packing and -processing industry. By the early 1900s, numerous light and heavy industries were established. Redevelopment of the Stockyards site as a housing and retail area by Olexa Developments of Calgary is scheduled for 2020. It is planned that in the first phase of the development, 600 housing units are to be constructed.

In the 1950s and 1960s the neighbourhoods of Windsor Park and Southdale developed into residential areas. In 2016 Windsor Park had a population of 10,050 and Southdale had a population of 6,450.

Map showing the former boundaries of the City of St. Boniface.

In 1971, St. Boniface was amalgamated, along with several neighbouring communities, into the City of Winnipeg. As one of the largest French-Canadian communities outside Québec, it has often been a centre of struggles to preserve French-Canadian language and culture within Manitoba.

== Places and culture ==
The St. Boniface area covers much of the eastern part of Winnipeg, including Old St. Boniface.

It also includes the Canadian National Railway's Symington Yards, a major rail-handling facility; and the Union Stockyards, which were once the largest of their kind in Canada.

=== Neighbourhoods ===
The St. Boniface city ward, represented by City Councillor Matt Allard, is composed of the following neighbourhoods: Archwood, Dufresne, Central St. Boniface, Holden, Island Lakes, Maginot, The Mint, Mission Industrial, Niakwa Park, Niakwa Place, North St. Boniface, Norwood East, Norwood West, Southdale, Stock Yards, and Windsor Park.

The ward mostly corresponds to the community area of St. Boniface and neighbourhood clusters of St. Boniface East and West, which are used by Statistics Canada for demographic purposes. However, while the community area—or clusters—include all of the neighbourhoods of the city ward, it also extends eastward past Lagimodière Boulevard (Note: The local name of Winnipeg Route 20.) to Plessis Road, thereby including the neighbourhoods of Dugald, Royalwood, Sage Creek, Southland Park, St. Boniface Industrial Park, and Symington Yards. Sage Creek is known for its wetlands and park areas including 13 naturalized stormwater ponds and two back flood basins that prevent flooding from the Seine River that runs through the community.

=== Culture ===
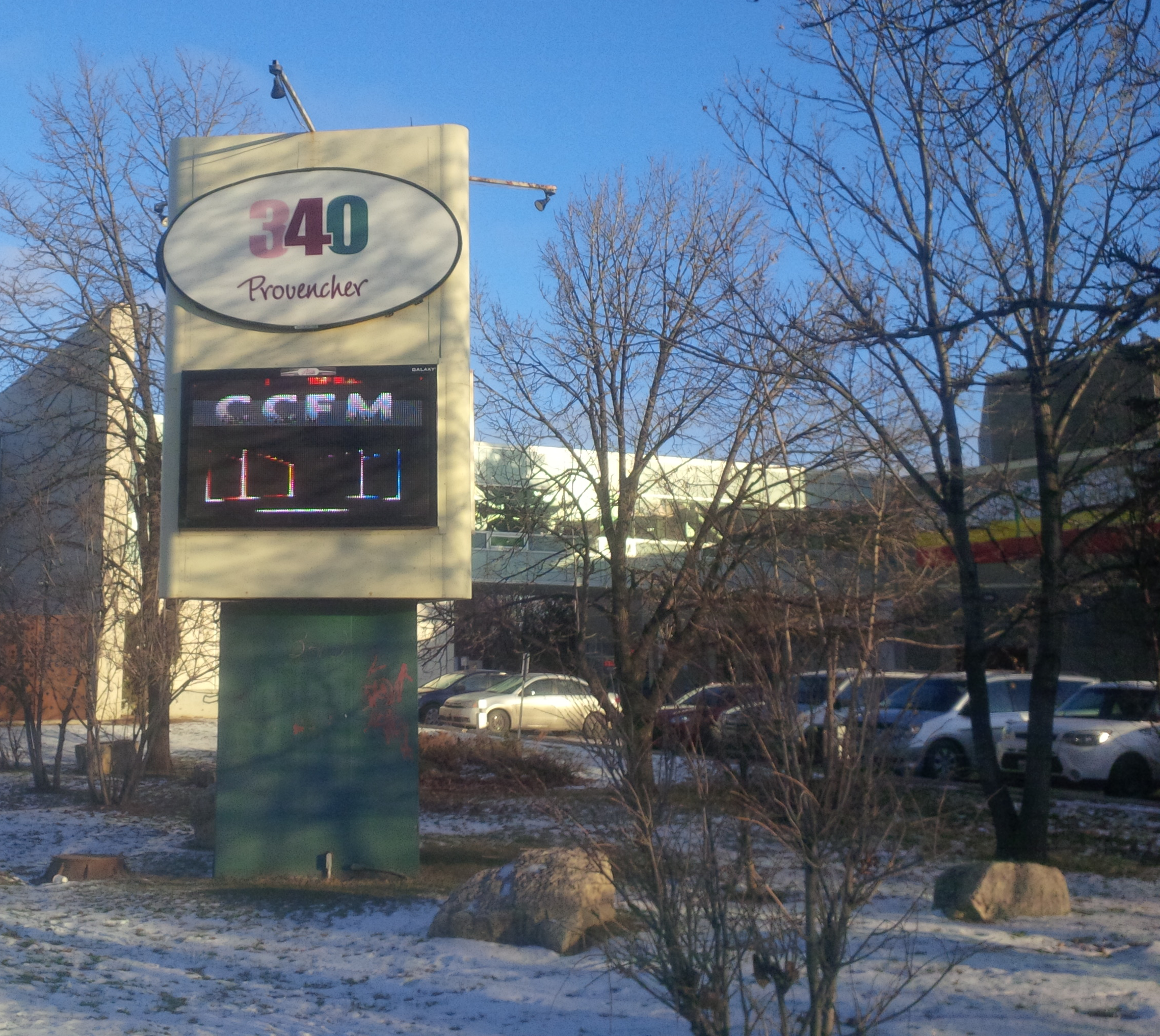
CCFM Building in St. Boniface

St. Boniface is home to the Festival du Voyageur, held annually in February outdoors at Whittier Park and Fort Gibraltar, as well as Cinémental, the city's annual francophone film festival.

The area also hosts the Centre culturel franco-manitobain (CCFM; the Franco-Manitoban Cultural Centre), which features an art gallery, theatres, meeting rooms, and a community radio station; Le Musée de Saint-Boniface Museum, a local museum dedicated to Franco-Manitoban culture and history; and Le Cercle Molière, a French-language theatre group and Canada's oldest theatre company.

The Centre du Patrimoine is a heritage centre housing the largest Franco-Manitoban archives in Manitoba, as well as the Société historique de Saint-Boniface (SHSB), the oldest historical society in western Canada.

=== Landmarks ===
The area features such landmarks as the Boulevard Provencher, (Note: The local name of the part of Winnipeg Route 57 east of the Red River.) Esplanade Riel, Fort Gibraltar, Lagimodière-Gaboury Park, the Provencher Bridge, the Royal Canadian Mint, St. Boniface Cathedral (including the grave of Louis Riel in its churchyard), St. Boniface Hospital, and the Université de Saint-Boniface.

The House of Archbishop Alexandre-Antonin Taché, which is now used for administrative purposes by the Archdiocese of St. Boniface, is one of the oldest stone buildings in western Canada.

== Notable people ==
- Hammy Baker – professional hockey player
- George Belanger – lead singer of Harlequin
- Louis Bétournay – lawyer and judge
- Mud Bruneteau – professional hockey player
- Len Cariou – Broadway theatre actor
- Earl Dawson – politician and president of the Manitoba and Canadian Amateur Hockey Associations
- Bryan Fustukian – radio disc jockey, concert promoter and performer
- Tony Gingras – right-winger for the Winnipeg Victorias
- Butch Goring – professional hockey player
- George R. D. Goulet – best-selling Métis author
- Robert Houle - Saulteaux artist
- Bob Hunter – Greenpeace co-founder
- Valerie Jerome - sprinter
- Jennifer Jones - Canadian & World Champion Curler
- Ambroise-Dydime Lépine - Métis military leader during the Red River Rebellion
- Earl Mindell – writer and nutritionist
- Dorothy Patrick – actress
- Jim Peebles - cosmologist and Nobel Prize winner
- Louis Riel – Métis leader and founder of Manitoba
- Sara Riel – first Métis member of the Grey Nuns
- Gabrielle Roy – French language author
- Lucille Starr – (née Savoie) singer
- Jonathan Toews – professional hockey player

== Media ==
Winnipeg's three Francophone radio stations, CKXL-FM, CKSB-10-FM and CKSB-FM, are located in St. Boniface and are licensed there, a legacy of when St. Boniface was a separate city.

The French-language weekly newspaper La Liberté is also based in St. Boniface.

== Sports ==
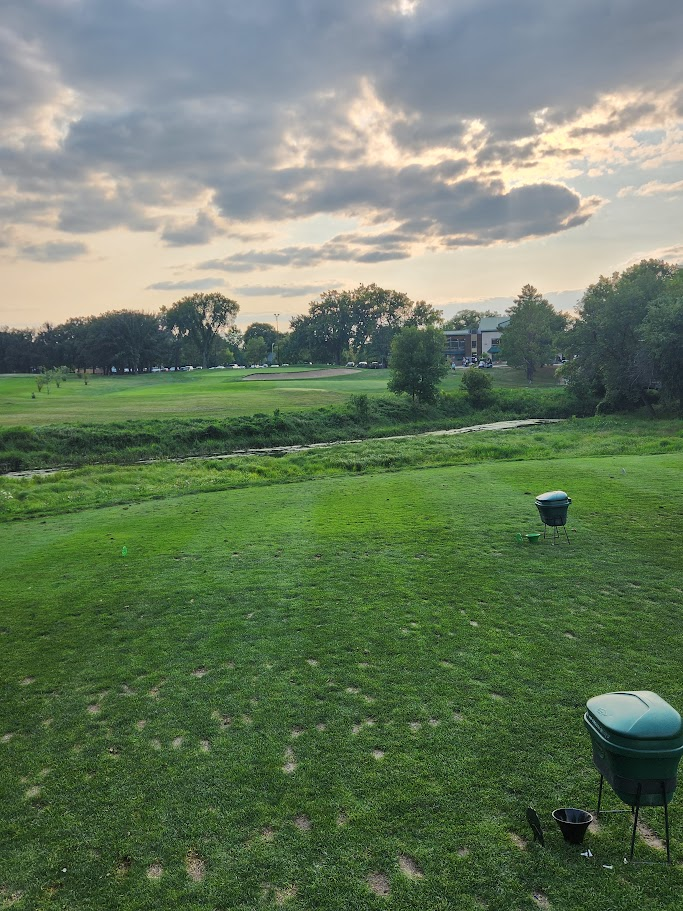
18th tee box at St. Boniface Golf Club

St. Boniface is represented by the St. Boniface Riels hockey team which plays in the Manitoba Major Junior Hockey League (MMJHL). The St. Boniface Riels were founded in 1971. They play at the Southdale Arena and have won five MMJHL championships: 1971–1972, 1972–1973, 1984–1985, 1985–1986, 2014–2015.

St. Boniface is home to three golf courses. The fully private Niakwa Country Club, the semi-private St. Boniface Golf Club, and the public city owned Windsor Park Golf Course. The Manitoba Open, a professional tournament associated with PGA development tours, has been hosted in St. Boniface 11 times at the Niakwa Country Club.

Curling is a popular winter activity in St. Boniface with the Heather Curling Club hosting eight indoor curling sheets within the neighborhood. The Heather Curling club has hosted both provincial championships and national invitational tournaments.
