= Étienne Gaboury =

Canadian architect (1930–2022)

Étienne Gaboury CM OM
- Born: April 24, 1930; Bruxelles, Manitoba, Canada
- Died: October 14, 2022 (aged 92)
- Occupation: Architect
- Awards: Order of Canada (2010)
- Buildings: Royal Canadian Mint building in Winnipeg; Precious Blood Church; new Saint Boniface Cathedral; Esplanade Riel

Étienne-Joseph Gaboury CM OM (April 24, 1930 – October 14, 2022) was a Canadian architect from Winnipeg, Manitoba. He was noted for designing key buildings in his hometown, such as the Royal Canadian Mint building, Esplanade Riel, Saint Boniface Cathedral, and the Precious Blood Church, and was regarded as the province's greatest architect.

== Early life ==
Gaboury was born in Bruxelles, Manitoba, on April 24, 1930. His parents, Napoléon and Valentine Gaboury, were French-Canadian farmers. He was the youngest of 11 children, and was a distant relative of Louis Riel. Gaboury studied architecture and Latin at St. Boniface College in the University of Manitoba, graduating with a Bachelor of Arts in 1953. He then obtained a Bachelor of Architecture from the same institution five years later. While studying at the École des Beaux Arts in Paris from 1958 to 1959, he was greatly influenced by the designs of Le Corbusier.

== Career ==
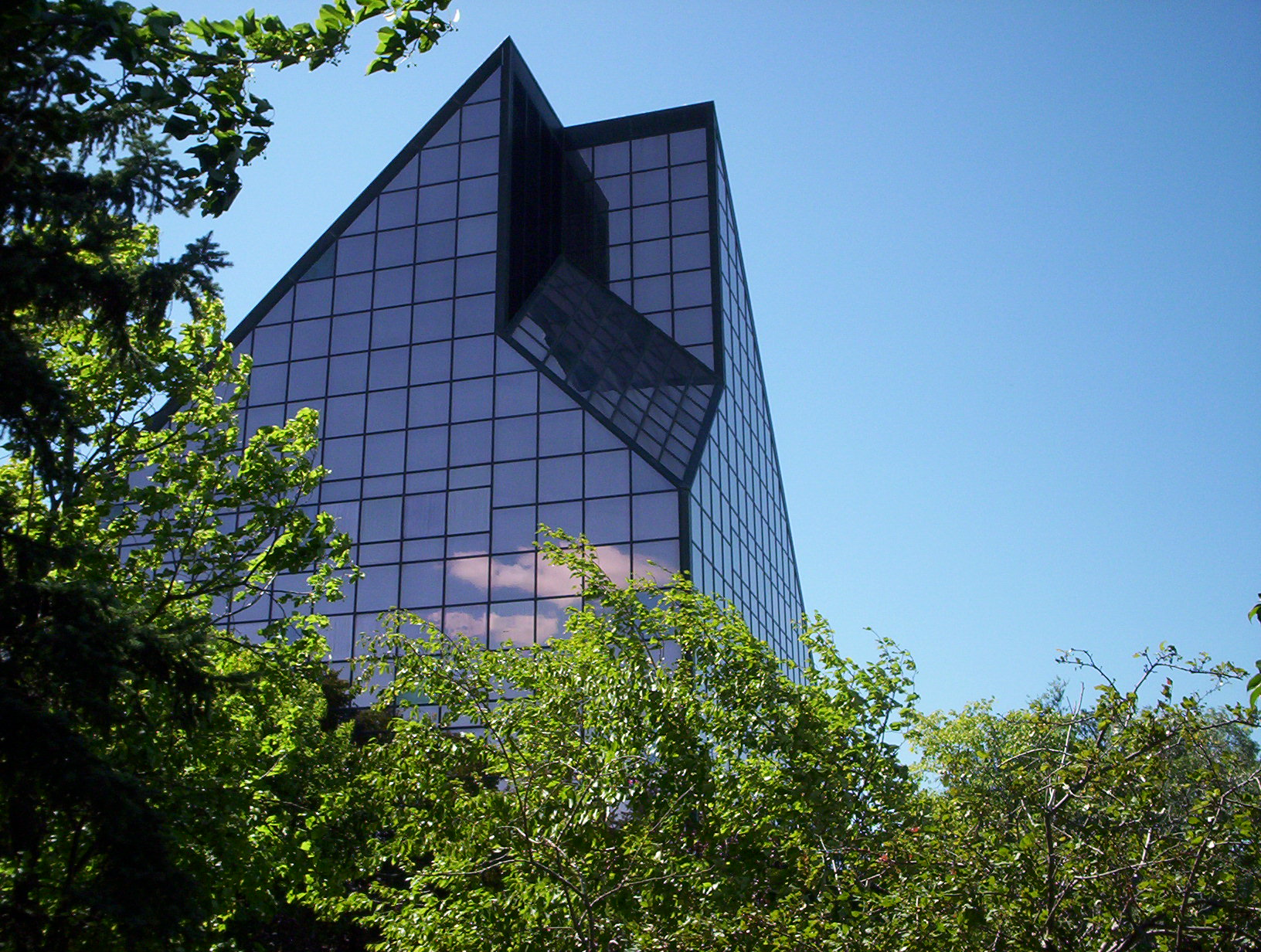
Gaboury's Royal Canadian Mint (Winnipeg)

After returning from Paris, Gaboury settled in Winnipeg, where he established an architectural partnership with Denis Lussier and Frank Sigurdson. He eventually became its sole principal in 1976. Gaboury was known for his regional prairie designs that incorporated elements of the physical, emotional, and spiritual, and characterized himself as a "plains architect". He ultimately completed more than 300 projects, both in Canada and internationally, throughout his almost five-decade-long career.

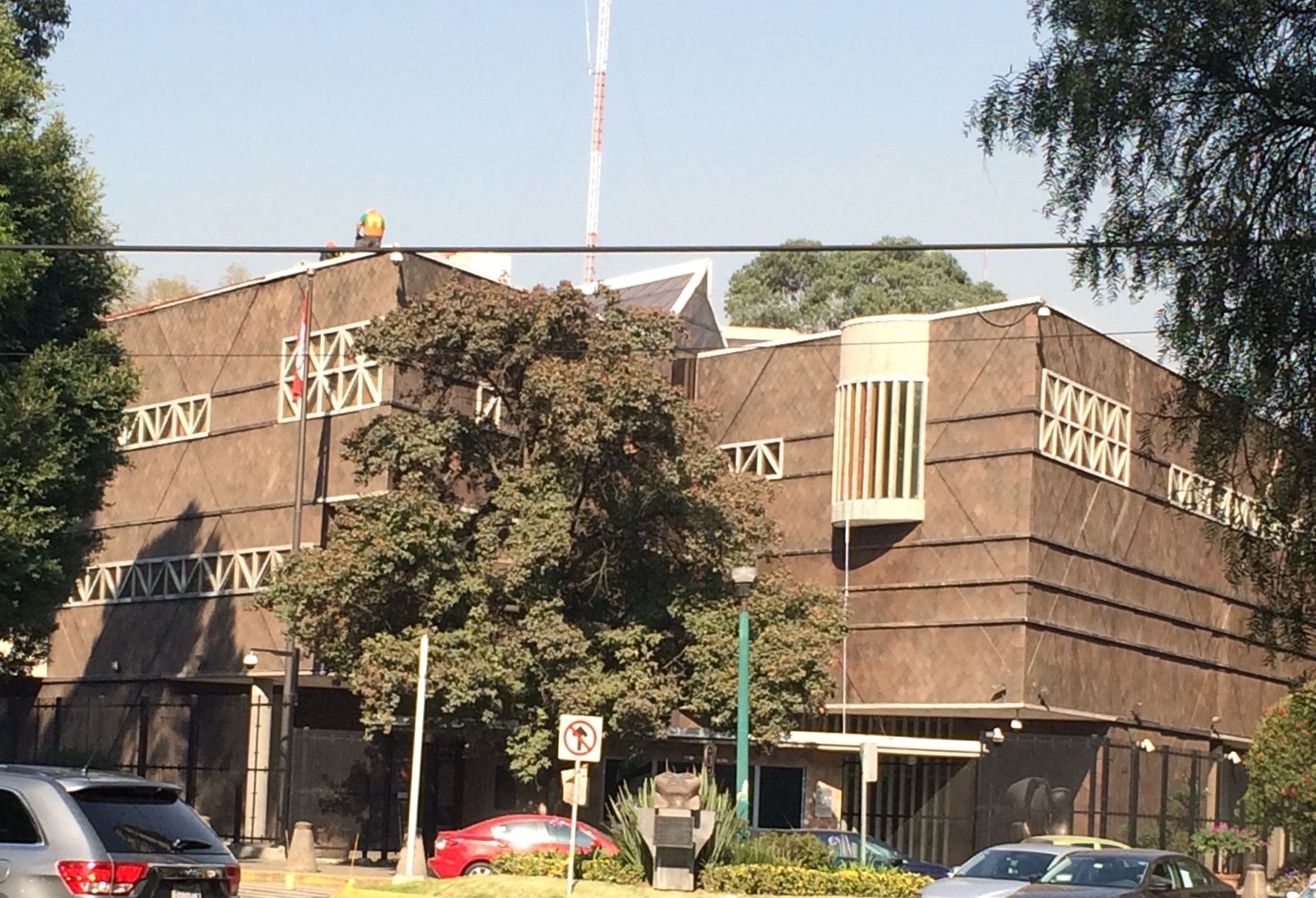
The Canadian Embassy in Mexico City (1982)

Notable projects by Gaboury include the new Saint Boniface Cathedral (1972), the Royal Canadian Mint building (1978), and the Esplanade Riel (2003), all in Winnipeg. The tipi-style Precious Blood Church – completed in 1968 in St. Boniface, Manitoba – featured eleven interior wood beams which form a smokeholelike skylight thirty metres above the altar. Gaboury later revealed that the project nearly fell through, with five earlier proposals being rejected before the final design was agreed to. His work in Manitoba extended beyond Winnipeg, as he was the architect for the Helen Betty Osborne Ininew Education Resource Centre (HBOIERC) in Norway House, Manitoba. The Canadian Embassy in Mexico (1982) was arguably his most well-known overseas project. Costing C$7.5 million and taking two years to build, the building's Mexican-inspired exterior and Canadian interior represented a dramatic departure from Gaboury usual style. He initially envisioned utilizing different tones of marble to differentiate the levels of the courtyard floor, but ultimately settled on a single tone due to the scarcity of the former when it came time to build. It was inaugurated by prime minister Pierre Trudeau in January 1982.

=== Sculpture of Louis Riel (1970) ===
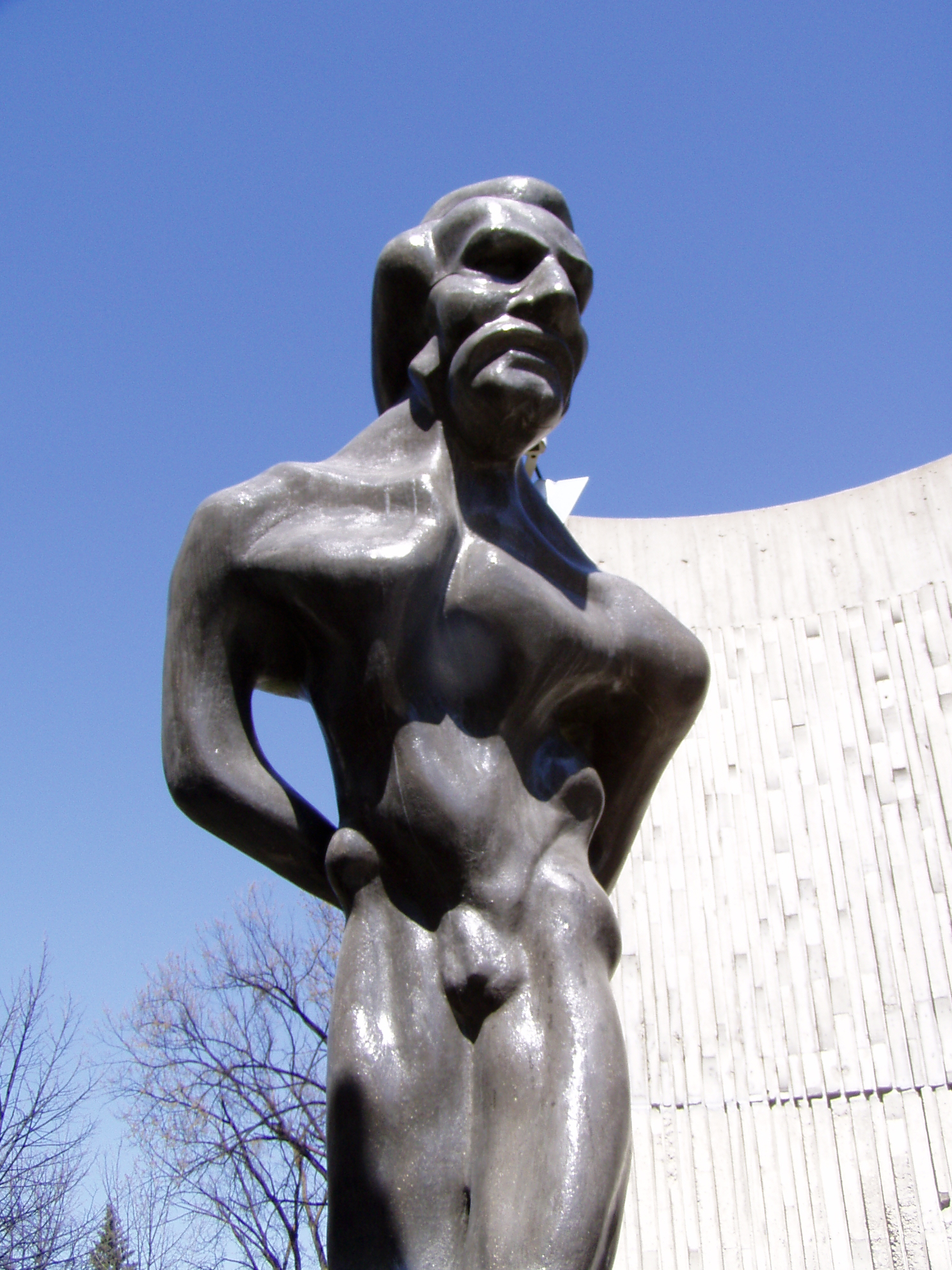
Tortured—Louis Riel statue at the Collège universitaire de Saint-Boniface

Gaboury designed the wall that surrounds sculptor Marcien Lemay's depiction of Canadian Métis leader Louis Riel as a naked and tortured figure. Gaboury envisioned the two surrounding concrete columns as a "cage" that epitomized Riel's spirit, instead of being a mere reproduction of the leader. He stated that he "want[ed] people to feel Riel's anxiety [and] become part of the monument". The statue was unveiled in 1970 and stood on the grounds of the Legislative Assembly of Manitoba for 23 years. The design proved to be controversial, attracting objections from the Métis community and being subjected to vandalism on multiple occasions. The statue was subsequently moved to the grounds of the Collège universitaire de Saint-Boniface in 1995.

== Personal life ==
Gaboury's wife was a ceramist. Their daughter, Lise Gaboury-Diallo, was an author and professor of literature at the University of St. Boniface. Grandfather of Anna Binta Diallo, multidisciplinary visual artist

Gaboury died on October 14, 2022, at the age of 92.

== Awards and honours ==
Gaboury was awarded an honorary degree from the University of Manitoba in 1987. He had earlier been conferred a Canadian Heritage Award for his reconstruction of Saint Boniface Cathedral. Gaboury was appointed a Member of the Order of Canada (CM) in May 2010 and invested six months later in November. Two years later, he was made a Member of the Order of Manitoba (OM).

== Books ==
- Étienne Gaboury, Éditions du Blé (2005) ISBN 9782921347686
