= Salisbury House (restaurant) =

Regional restaurant based in Winnipeg, Canada

Salisbury House of Canada Ltd.

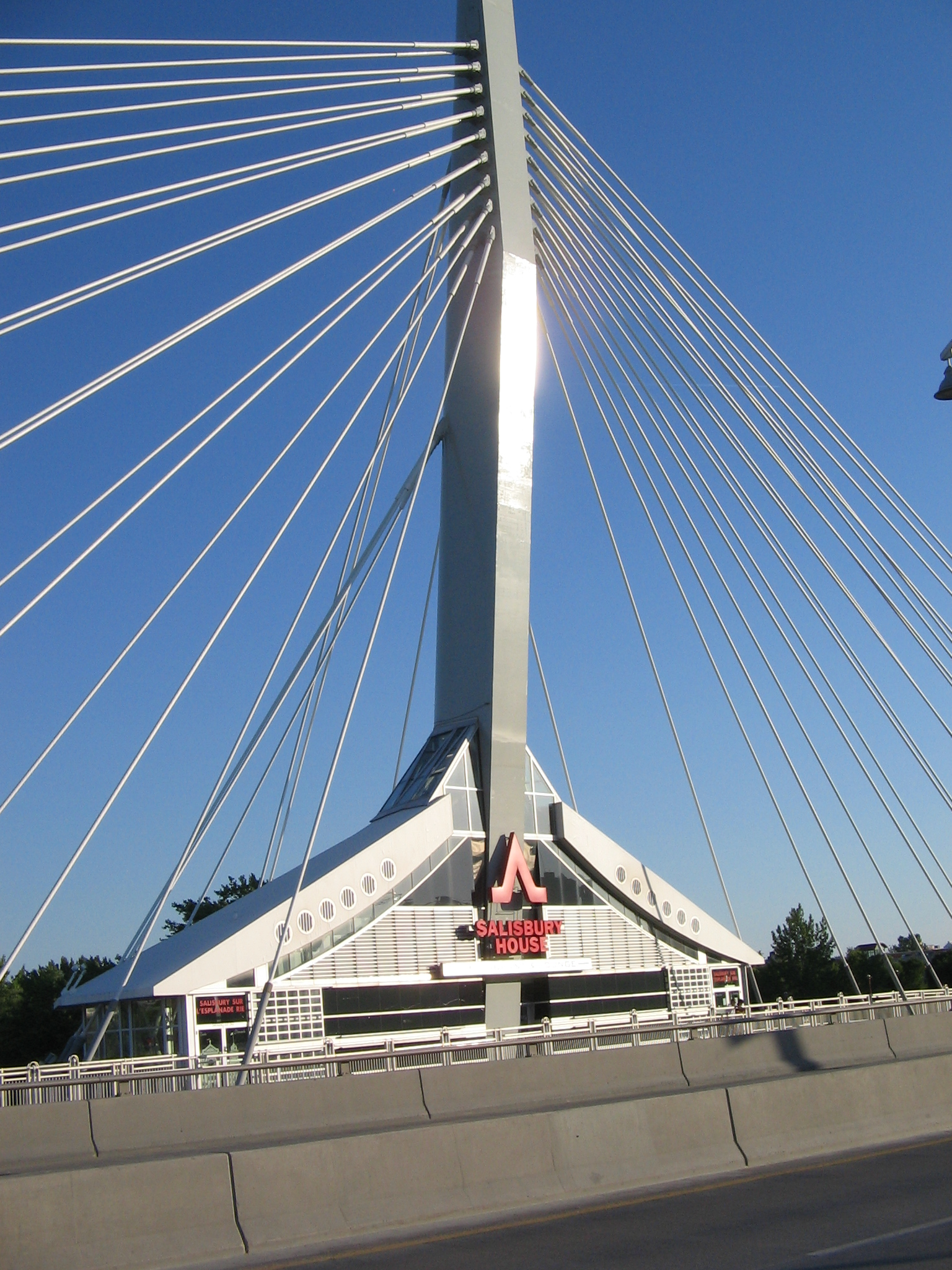
- Salisbury House restaurant on Esplanade Riel bridge in 2012
- Type: Private
- Industry: Food service
- Founded: 1931; 95 years ago, in Downtown Winnipeg
- Founder: Ralph Erwin
- Headquarters: 1 Bannister Rd., Winnipeg, Manitoba, Canada
- Number of locations: 12 year round, 2 seasonal
- Area served: Manitoba
- Key people: Brad Kramble
- Number of employees: 500+
- Website: www.salisburyhouse.ca

Salisbury House of Canada Ltd. is a restaurant chain based in Winnipeg, Manitoba, Canada.

Known locally as "Sals", the chain is considered a Winnipeg institution. The first Salisbury House restaurant was founded in downtown Winnipeg in 1931 by Ralph Erwin (September 2, 1902 – June 5, 1983), who named the venture after the salisbury steak. Erwin disliked the term 'hamburger' so named his burger a "nip" to market his hamburgers as a small 'nip' or bite of Salisbury steak.

The restaurant has twelve locations in Winnipeg and employs over 500 people. In 1979 Erwin sold his majority interest in the chain to a group of investors. In 2001, it was bought from its then Montreal owners by a group of local investors.

In the mid-2000s a location on the newly opened Esplanade Riel pedestrian bridge opened. However, this location became seasonal in 2008 after the chain said that the Esplanade Riel location was unsustainable due to a low volume of patronage. The bridge location closed in January 2013.

In December 2017, majority owners Earl and Cheryl Barish and their partners sold the chain to a partnership group that includes the Metis Economic Development Fund (MEDF), David Filmon, Brad Kramble and several senior managers of Salisbury House. It was announced on July 30, 2019, that Earl and Cheryl Barish had become partners again in the chain less than two years after selling in 2017.

== See also ==
- List of Canadian restaurant chains
