= Side-spar cable-stayed bridge =

Type of cable bridge

Side-Spar Cable-Stayed Bridge
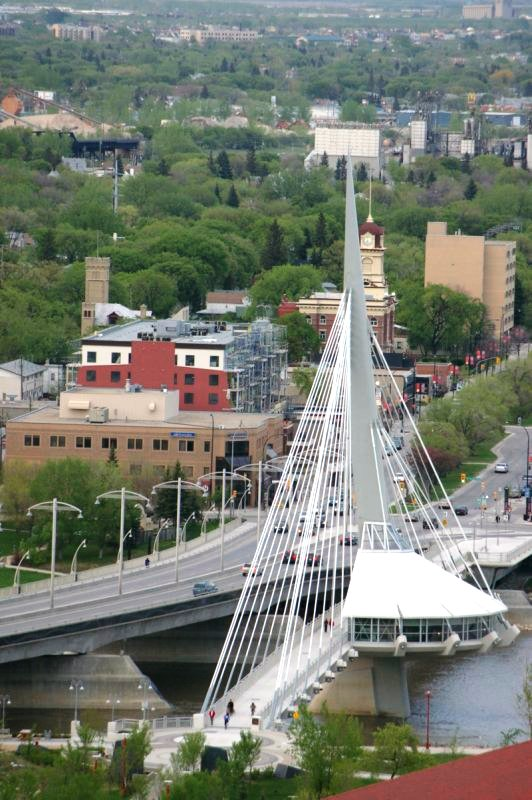
- Esplanade Riel in Winnipeg, Manitoba
- Span range: Medium
- Material: Steel, post-stressed concrete
- Movable: No
- Design effort: High
- Falsework required: No

A side-spar cable-stayed bridge may be an otherwise conventional cable-stayed bridge, but its cable support does not span the roadway, and is instead cantilevered from one side. The Esplanade Riel illustrated is located in Winnipeg, Manitoba, Canada. This bridge is intended for pedestrian use only and has a restaurant in its base.

In the example below the cable paths are aligned with the bridge centerline, so that structurally it differs only in the transfer of stresses through the tower to the foundation.

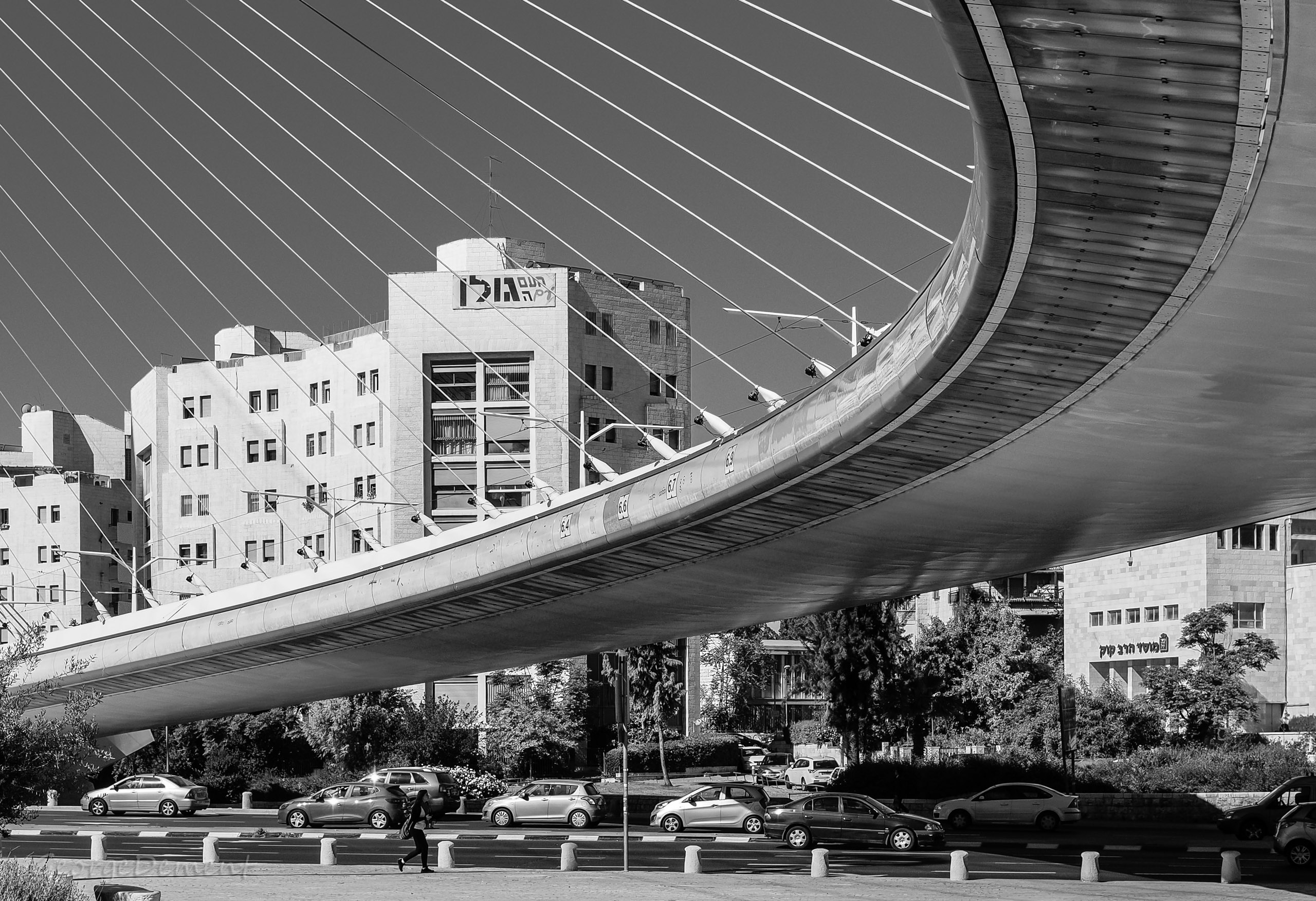
Chords Bridge in Jerusalem

The side-spar principle is not limited to a straight bridge, however. The tower could be offset and the bridge deck wrap around the spar in an arc, e.g., Chords Bridge in Jerusalem. Such a bridge would be particularly suited for use in the confines of a canyon, where the road is brought in the upstream direction down one side, crosses a stream, and turns back to a downstream direction on the other side. By placing a large portion of the turn on the bridge, rather than on the approaches, the turn may be made more gentle, allowing faster traffic. This would require more torsional (twisting) rigidity in the roadbed than would a straight bridge. A bridge of this type (supported by a spar), traveling through a much smaller arc, was one of the original proposals for the eastern span replacement of the San Francisco-Oakland Bay Bridge. Similar bridges, without the spar, could be supported by cables anchored in the canyon walls (where conditions are suitable).

This subtype should not be confused with an asymmetrical single tower cable-stayed bridge, which possesses a single tower on one side of the gap to be crossed (see Rama VIII Bridge), nor with the cantilever spar cable-stayed bridge, which has span supporting cables on only one side of the tower along the direction of the roadbed.

== Image gallery ==
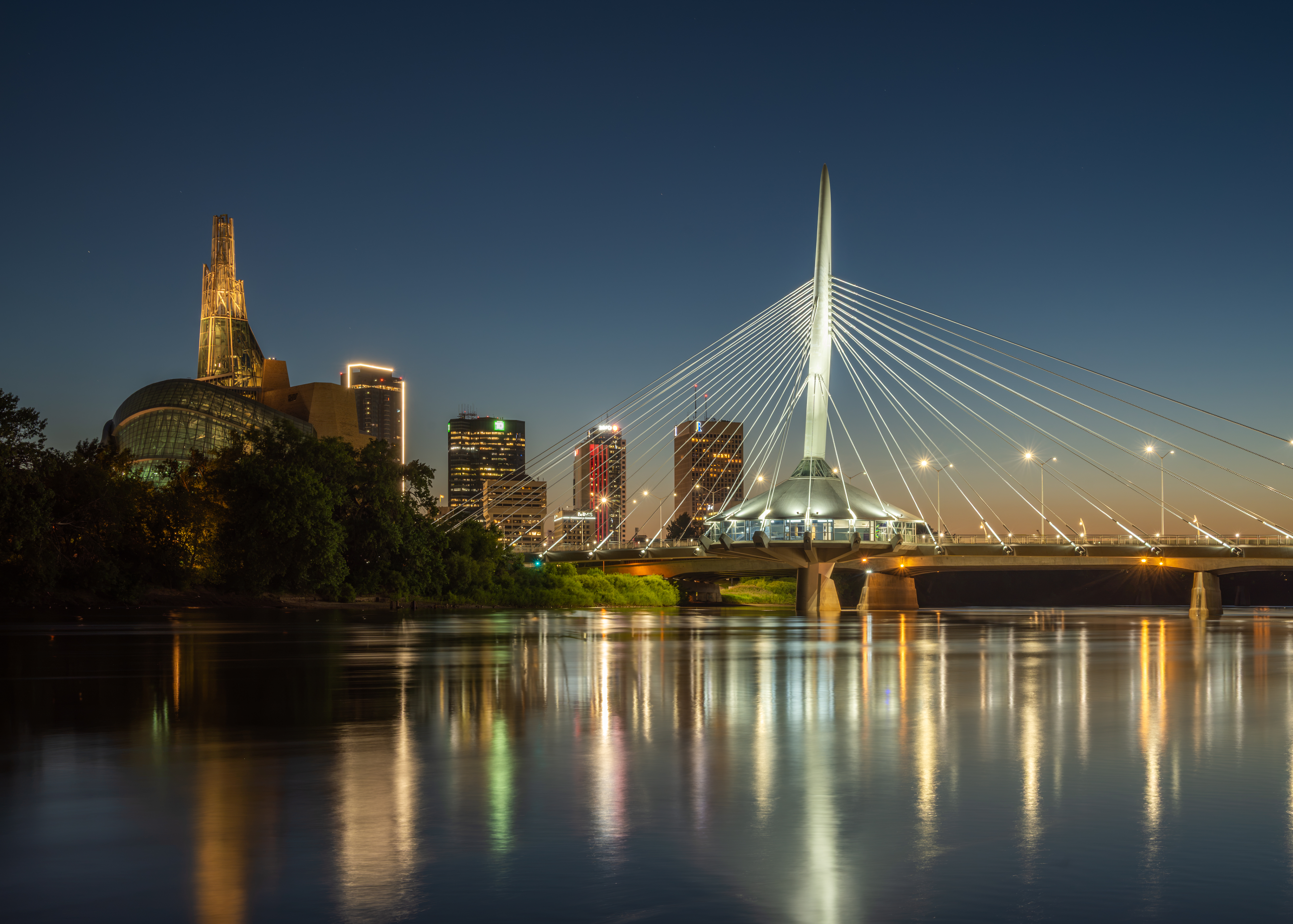
Esplanade Riel, Winnipeg

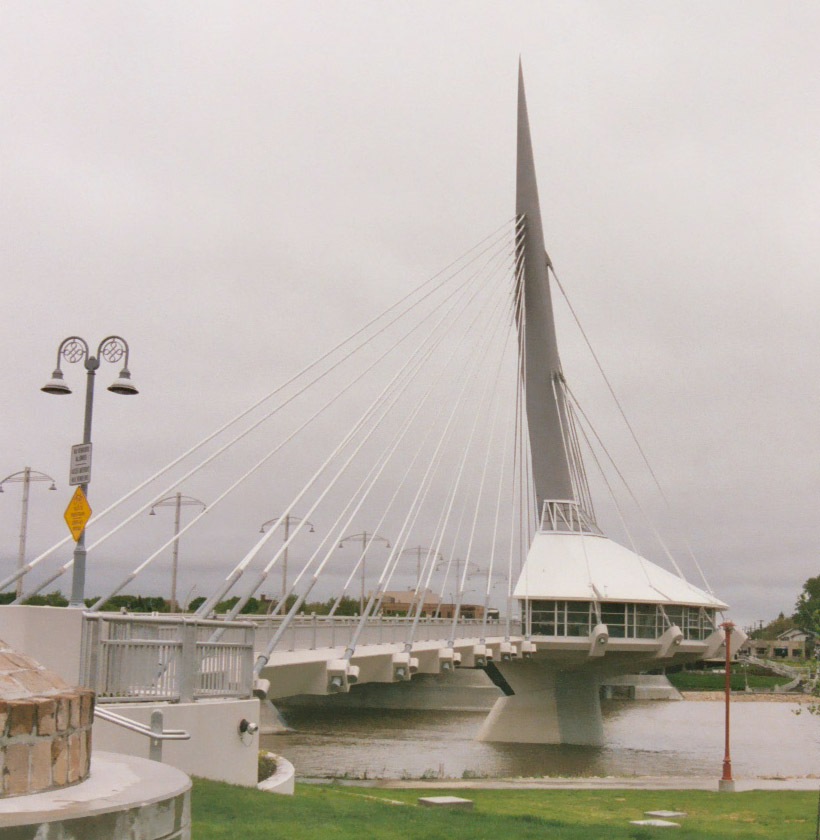
Esplanade Riel, Winnipeg

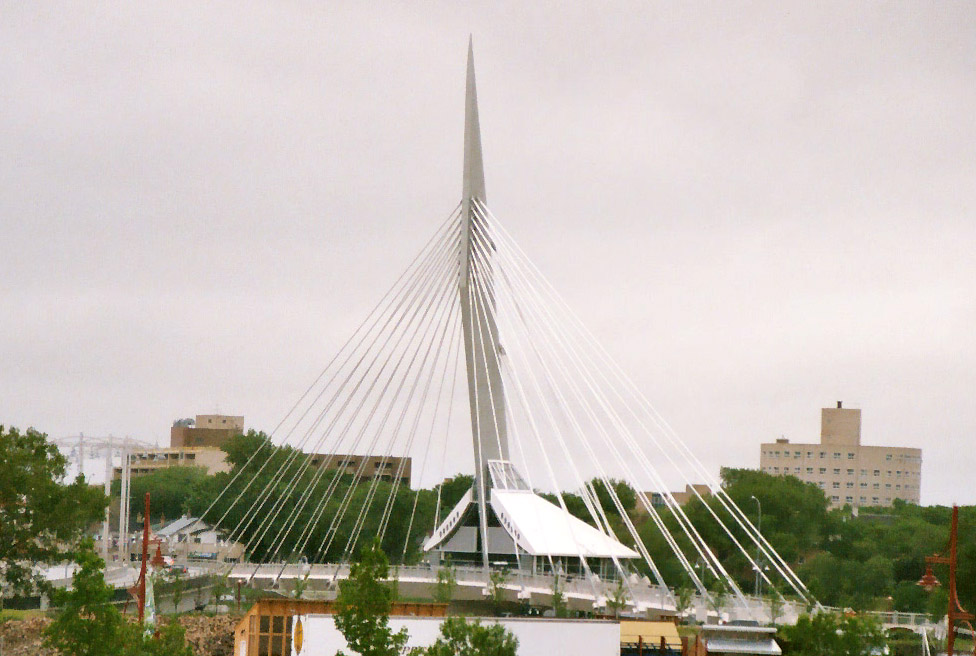
Esplanade Riel, Winnipeg

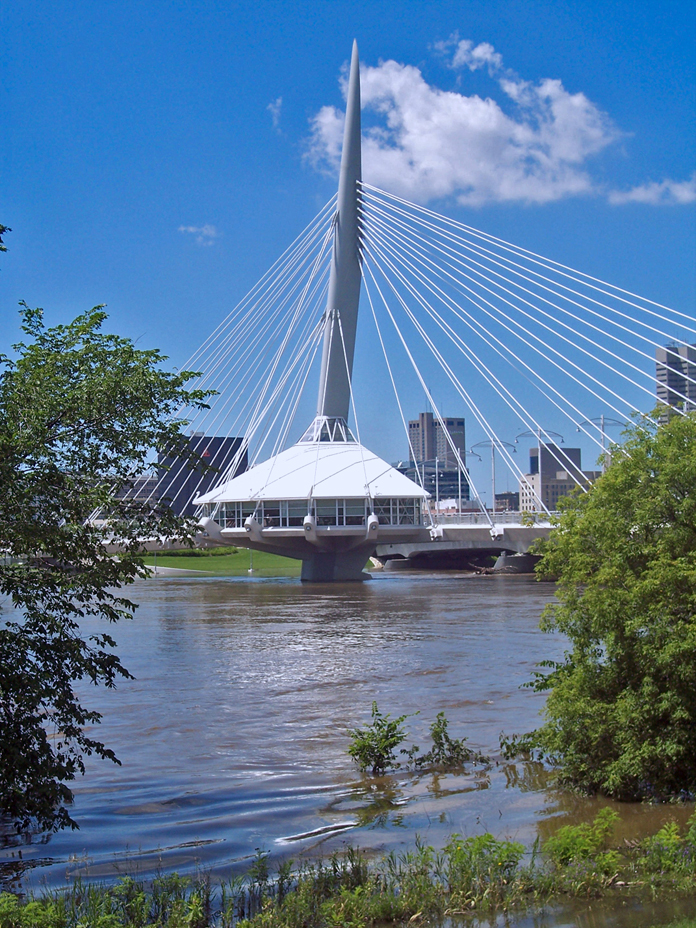
Esplanade Riel, Winnipeg

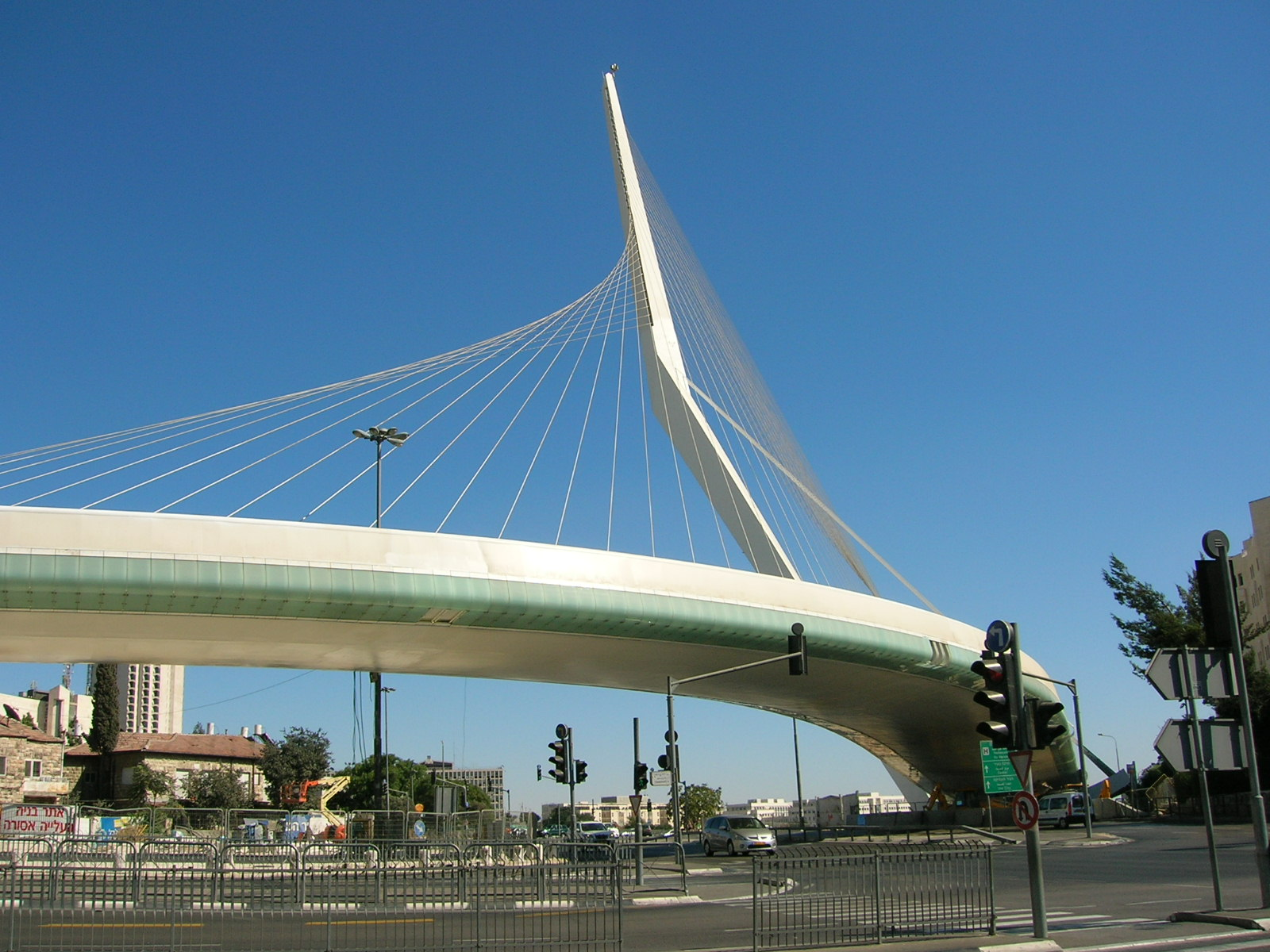
Chords Bridge, Jerusalem

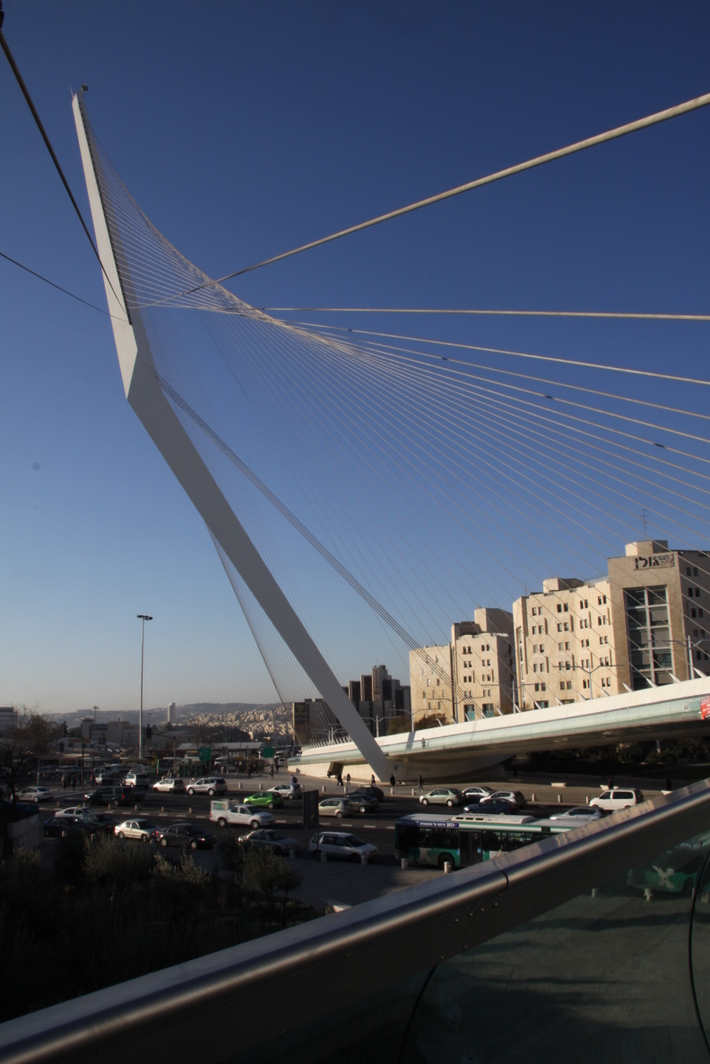
Chords Bridge, Jerusalem

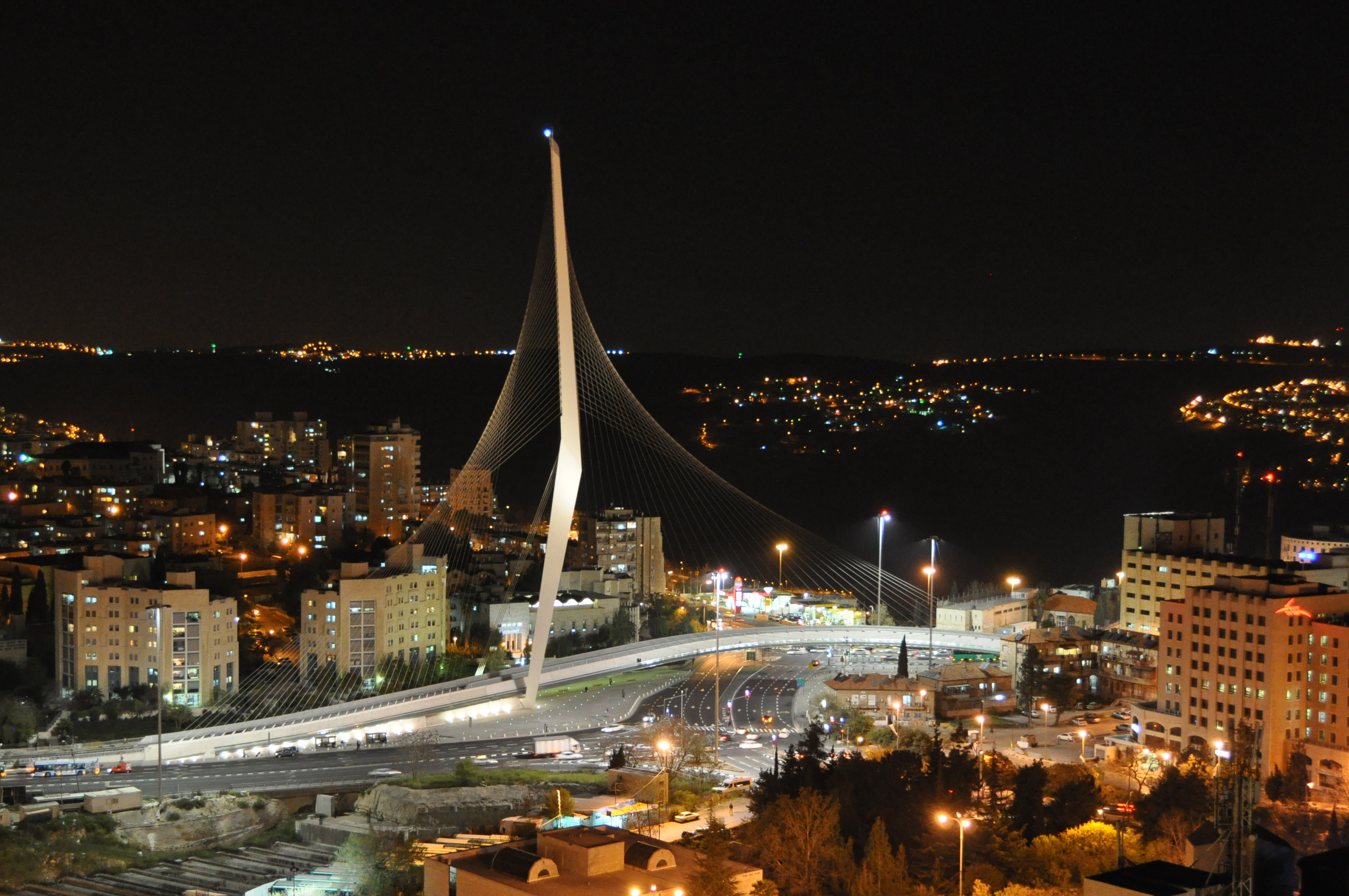
Chords Bridge, Jerusalem

== See also ==
- Cantilever spar cable-stayed bridge
