= Manitoba Provincial Road 221 =

Provincial road in Manitoba, Canada

Provincial Road 221
- Rosser Road
- PR 221 highlighted in red

Route information
- Maintained by Manitoba Infrastructure
- Length: 37.2 km (23.1 mi)
- Existed: 1966–present

Major junctions
- East end: PTH 190 near Winnipeg
- PTH 101 near Winnipeg
- West end: PR 248 at Marquette

Location
- Country: Canada
- Province: Manitoba
- Rural municipalities: Woodlands, Rosser

Highway system
- Provincial highways in Manitoba; Winnipeg City Routes
← PR 220	→ PR 222

Provincial Road 221 (PR 221) is a provincial road lying mostly in the Rural Municipality of Rosser, Manitoba, Canada. It runs northwest, from the junction of CentrePort Canada Way (PTH 190) and Sturgeon Road (near RM's boundary with the city of Winnipeg) to the community of Marquette, alongside the main Canadian Pacific Railway line. PR 221 and the rail line share a grade-separated crossing at the Perimeter Highway (PTH 101).

Between PTH 190 and the Perimeter Highway, PR 221 has been incorporated into the CentrePort Canada road network. As such, it has recently received upgrades and now has RTAC status, allowing for full tractor-trailer access between PTH 190 and PTH 101. Prior to the construction of CentrePort Canada Way, PR 221 linked with Inkster Boulevard (Winnipeg Route 25). Until the 1980s, PR 221 previously extended west of Marquette to PTH 26 along what is now Jubilee Road.

== Major intersections ==
Division	Location	km	mi	Destinations	Notes
Woodlands	Marquette	0.0	0.0	PR 248 (Marquette Road) – St. Eustache, Lake Francis	Western terminus; road continues as Jubilee Road
Rosser	Rosser	23.6	14.7	Road 67N	Former PR 236 east
Rosser		26.0	16.2	PR 334 south – Headingley	Northern terminus of PR 334
Rosser		33.0– 33.4	20.5– 20.8	PTH 101 (North Perimeter Highway)	PTH 101 exit 50
Rosser		37.2	23.1	PTH 190 (Centreport Canada Way)	Eastern terminus; road continues as Sturgeon Road
1.000 mi = 1.609 km; 1.000 km = 0.621 mi: Concurrency terminus
