= Old Kildonan =

Suburb of Winnipeg, Canada

- Ward
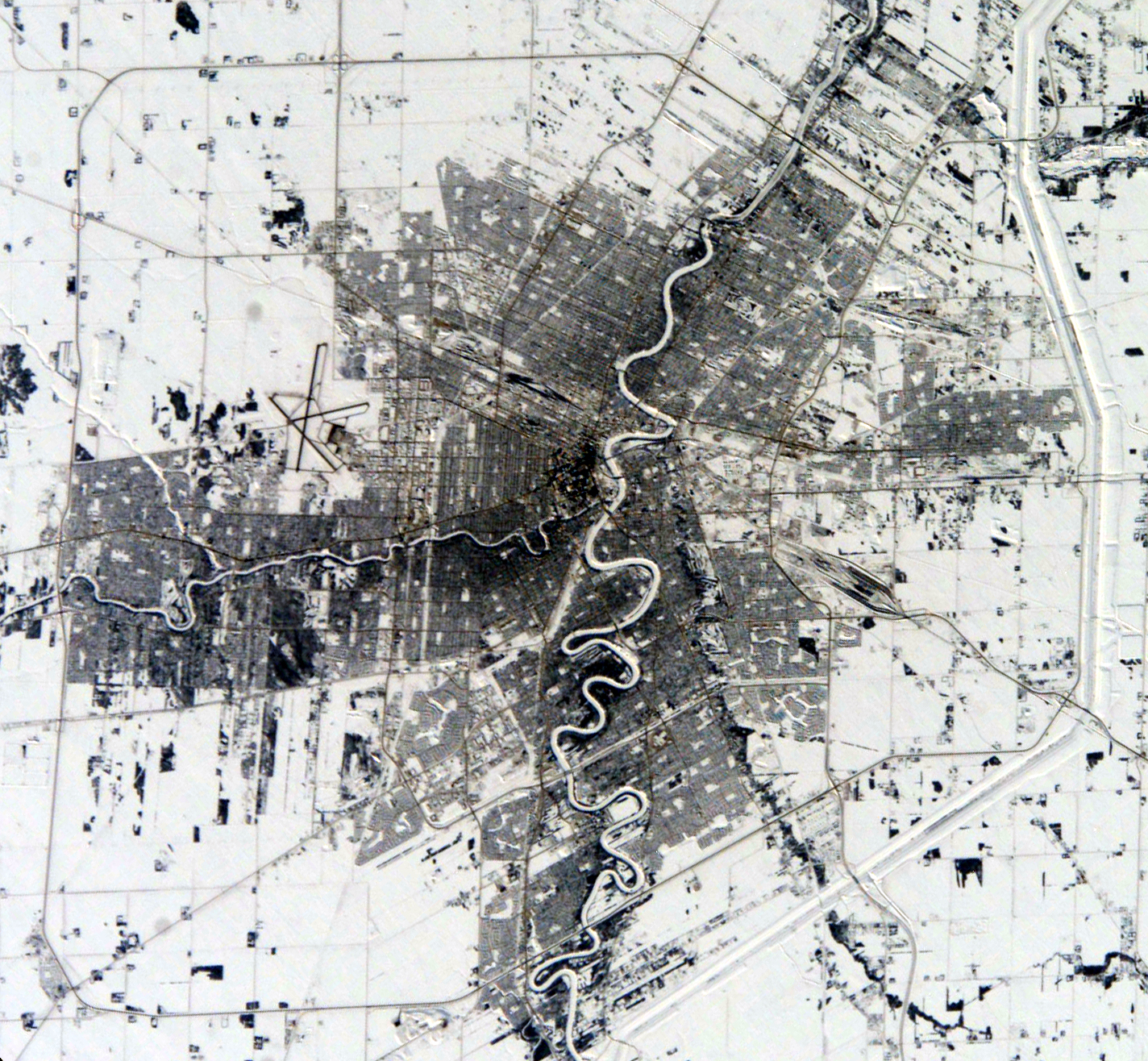
- Location within Winnipeg
- Coordinates: 49°58′00″N 97°08′00″W
- Country: Canada
- Province: Manitoba
- City: Winnipeg
- Incorporated: 1875; 151 years ago (Kildonan)
- Incorporated: July 1, 1921; 105 years ago (Municipality of Old Kildonan)
- Named for: Strath of Kildonan, Sutherlandshire, Scotland

Government
  - MPs: Kevin Lamoureux (Winnipeg North); Raquel Dancho (Kildonan—St. Paul)
  - MLAs: Mintu Sandhu (The Maples); Cindy Lamoureux (NW Tyndall Park); Jasdeep Devgan (S McPhillips); Diljeet Brar (NW Burrows)
  - City Councilor: Devi Sharma (Old Kildonan)

Area
  - Ward: 2,136.74 ha (5,280.0 acres)
  - Metro: 5,306.79 km^{2} (2,048.96 sq mi)

Population (2011)
  - Ward: 39,358
  - Density: 1,842.0/km^{2} (4,770.7/sq mi)
  - Metro: 778,489
- Time zone: UTC-6 (CST)
  - Summer (DST): UTC-5 (CDT)
- Forward Sortation Areas: R2P
- Area codes: 204, 431

Old Kildonan is the northernmost city ward of Winnipeg, Manitoba. Before the City of Winnipeg Act of 1972, it was an independent unincorporated municipality called the Municipality of Old Kildonan; prior to that, from 1914, it was a subdivision of the Rural Municipality of Kildonan.

It is bounded by the north limit of the City of Winnipeg on the north; by the CP Winnipeg Beach railway, slightly past McPhillips Street, on the east; Brookside Boulevard (Winnipeg Route 90) on the west; and by Inkster Boulevard (Route 23) on the south.

The ward falls within the community area of Seven Oaks and is served by the Seven Oaks School Division. Its population was 47,155 as of the 2016 census.

== Geography ==
Old Kildonan is the northernmost city ward in Winnipeg, stretching to the city's north perimeter.

Directly to its north is the Rural Municipality of West St. Paul, with the RM of East St. Paul to its northeast. To its east, it is bounded by the CP Winnipeg Beach railway (with a sliver reaching farther to Main Street) past McPhillips Street, sitting adjacent to the North Kildonan ward; to its west by Brookside Boulevard (Winnipeg Route 90); to its south/southwest by Inkster Boulevard (Route 23), adjacent to the Point Douglas ward; and to its southeast by the Mynarski ward.

The ward includes such neighbourhoods as Garden City, The Maples, Amber Trail, Leila-Mcphillips Triangle, Leila North, Templeton-Sinclair, North Inkster Industrial, West Kildonan Industrial, Rosser-Old Kildonan, and Mandalay West.

== History ==
Federal census population history of Old Kildonan
Year	Pop.	±%
1926	451	—
1931	647	+43.5%
1936	567	−12.4%
1941	704	+24.2%
1946	666	−5.4%
1951	869	+30.5%
1956	1,011	+16.3%
1961	1,327	+31.3%
1966	1,392	+4.9%
1971	1,984	+42.5%
Source: Statistics Canada

Old Kildonan was originally part of the Rural Municipality of Kildonan in Manitoba, from 1914 until 1921.

The Parish of Kildonan was founded in 1812 by the Scottish philanthropist Thomas Douglas, 5th Earl of Selkirk, who named it Kildonan in 1817 for the Strath of Kildonan in Sutherlandshire, Scotland, from where many of the early settlers had come. There, in 1851, the first Presbyterian Church in western Canada was established.

The area was administered by the Council of Assiniboia until the creation of the Province of Manitoba in 1870. Following the signing of Treaty 1 with the Chippewa (Anishinabe) and Cree First Nations in 1871, settlement increased in the region and the process of municipal development had accelerated. In 1875, Kildonan became one of the districts of the Red River Colony, and originally rivalled Fort Garry in the Winnipeg area. In 1876, the community was incorporated as the Municipality of Kildonan and St. James, later becoming the Rural Municipality of Kildonan in 1880/1881.

From 1875 to 1914, Kildonan encompassed land on both sides of the Red River north of the original City of Winnipeg. In 1914, the area was divided into the RM of East Kildonan (east of the river) and the RM of West Kildonan (west of the river).

West Kildonan initially included what is now Old Kildonan, but differences soon emerged: West Kildonan developed largely as a residential suburb of Winnipeg, while Old Kildonan remained predominantly rural, retaining the character of the original "Old" Parish of Kildonan. These differences led to the division of West Kildonan, Old Kildonan, and North Kildonan into separate municipalities on 1 July 1921. Following the reorganization, Robert Toshack was elected the first reeve of Old Kildonan, and H. J. Seymour was elected councillor by acclamation in June 1921.

The area did not see substantial development until the late 1960s with the construction of The Maples subdivision, and even today contains substantial undeveloped areas and a number of farms.

Map showing the former boundaries of the R.M. of Old Kildonan.

Following the City of Winnipeg Act of 1972, Old Kildonan was amalgamated into the City of Winnipeg along with the other Kildonans and several other municipalities.

=== Past reeves ===
Prior to its 1972 amalgamation, Old Kildonan was led by the following elected reeves:

Term	Reeve
1922–1935	Robert Wilke Toshack (1859–1943)
1936–1949	Harry Wilson Swailes (1887–1977)
1950–1954	Duncan Fairlie Christie (1909–1977)
1955–1959	Samuel Nikolaievich "Sam" Bondar (c. 1899-1973)
1959–1964	John Stephan Blechner [Blackner] (1907–1984)
1964–1965	Sam Nikolaievich Bondar
1965–1966	John Stephan Blechner
1966–1968	John Michael Pickley (1913–1998)
1968–1971	Charles Walter "Charlie" Ferrier (1917–2005)

== Demographics and crime ==
The ward falls within the community area of Seven Oaks and is served by the Seven Oaks School Division. Its population was 39,358 as of the 2011 census, growing to 47,155 as of the 2016 census.

In 2017, to help balance ward populations, Winnipeg's Wards Boundaries Commission moved two neighbourhoods from Old Kildonan to North Kildonan: Riverbend and Rivergrove.

In 2018, from the first of January to September 28, 364 crimes were reported from the area to police, compared to 303 during the same period the previous year—marking a 20% increase. In both periods, the most frequently reported crime was motor vehicle theft: 114 incidents in the 2018 period, compared to 82 from January to September 2017—a 39% increase.

== See also ==
- List of rural municipalities in Manitoba
