= Winnipeg Route 17 =

City route in Winnipeg

Route 17
- Chief Peguis Trail
- Route 17 highlighted in red

Route information
- Maintained by City of Winnipeg
- Length: 5.1 km (3.2 mi)
- Existed: 1990–present

Major junctions
- West end: Route 52 (Main St)
- Route 42 (Henderson Hwy)
- East end: PTH 59 / Route 20 (Lagimodiere Blvd)

Location
- Country: Canada
- Province: Manitoba

Highway system
- Provincial highways in Manitoba; Winnipeg City Routes
← Route 180	→ Route 20

Route 17, also known as Chief Peguis Trail, or CPT, is a major highway in Winnipeg, Manitoba, Canada. It connects Routes 52 (Main Street) and 20 (Lagimodiere Boulevard).

== Route description ==
Route 17 is the lowest numbered Winnipeg city route. Despite its comparatively short length of 5 km (3 mi), the speed limit is 80 km/h (50 mph). The first section of roadway (between Main and Henderson) was opened on October 19, 1990, and officially named the Chief Peguis Trail on November 1, 1991. The second section was opened on December 2, 2011.

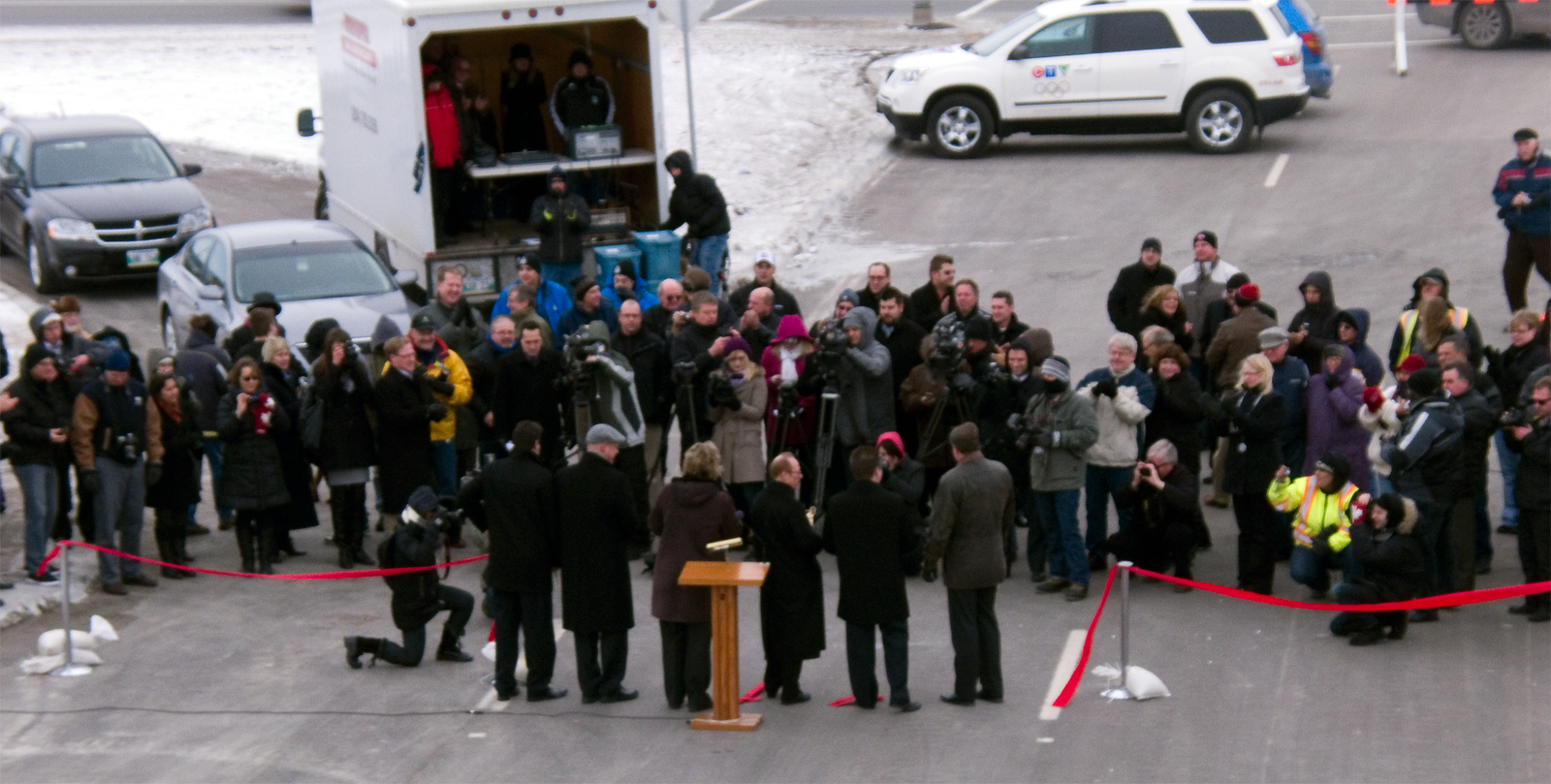
Ribbon Cutting of the Chief Peguis Extension

The first extension routes most vehicular traffic away from collector and residential streets throughout the North Kildonan ward travelling west-east.

The extension includes features such as:

- Grade-separated overpass at Rothesay Street
- Pedestrian bridge just west of Gateway Road—allowing the Northeast Pioneers Greenway to pass overtop of the CPT, circumventing the at-grade crosswalk
- Built-in Active Transportation trail along the northern projection

Chief Peguis Trail crosses the Red River. The bridge over the river is called the Kildonan Settlers Bridge, and features names of local early settlers of the area on each street light.

Chief Peguis Trail is part of a proposed strategic inner ring road, alternative to the Perimeter Highway.

== Major intersections ==
The entire route is in Winnipeg.

km	mi	Destinations	Notes
		Brookside Boulevard (Route 90)	Proposed western extension
		McPhillips Street (Route 180)	Proposed western extension
0.0	0.0	Main Street (Route 52)	Interchange proposed
0.4	0.25	Kildonan Settlers Bridge across Red River	
1.4	0.87	Henderson Highway (Route 42)	
3.5	2.2	Gateway Road	
5.1	3.2	Lagimodiere Boulevard (Route 20) / PTH 59	
1.000 mi = 1.609 km; 1.000 km = 0.621 mi: Unopened

== See also ==
- List of Winnipeg city routes
- List of Manitoba Expressways
