= Manitoba Provincial Road 409 =

Provincial road in Manitoba, Canada

Provincial Road 409
- Pipeline Road, Grassmere Road
- PR 409 highlighted in red

Route information
- Maintained by Department of Infrastructure
- Length: 4.7 km (2.9 mi)
- Existed: 1966–present

Major junctions
- South end: PTH 101 / Pipeline Road south
- North end: PR 220 in West St. Paul

Location
- Country: Canada
- Province: Manitoba
- Rural municipalities: West St. Paul

Highway system
- Provincial highways in Manitoba; Winnipeg City Routes
← PR 408	→ PR 410

Provincial Road 409 (PR 409) is a 4.7-kilometre-long (2.9 mi) provincial road in the Winnipeg Metropolitan Region of the Canadian province of Manitoba. The paved two-lane highway runs from the Perimeter Highway (where it connects with Pipeline Road south), turn east north of Burns Road (as Grassmere Road) to PR 220 (Blackdale Road) in West St. Paul.

It is not a major route, primarily serving agricultural areas and suburban homes north of Winnipeg.

== Major intersections ==
Division	Location	km	mi	Destinations	Notes
City of Winnipeg / West St. Paul boundary		0.0	0.0	PTH 101 (North Perimeter Highway); Pipeline Road	Southern terminus; road continues south into Winnipeg as Pipeline Road
West St. Paul		3.0	1.9	Bridge over Grassmere Creek	
West St. Paul		4.7	2.9	PR 220 (Blackdale Road / Grassmere Road)	Northern terminus
1.000 mi = 1.609 km; 1.000 km = 0.621 mi
