= Hebrew Sick Benefit Cemetery =

- Interactive map of Hebrew Sick Benefit Cemetery

Details
- Established: 1911
- Location: 2605 McPhillips Street, Winnipeg
- Country: Canada
- Coordinates: 49.96028°N 97.13717°W
- Find a Grave: Hebrew Sick Benefit Cemetery

Hebrew Sick Benefit Cemetery is a Jewish cemetery in Winnipeg, Canada. Founded in 1911, it contained approximately 3,500 graves as of 1996. It also contains a war memorial to fallen Jewish servicemen in World War II.

== History ==
The cemetery was founded in 1911 by the Hebrew Sick Benefit Association of Winnipeg, which had been established five years earlier as a loan society and social group. Located in the Old Kildonan district, it is one of six Jewish cemeteries in the city.

In keeping with Jewish tradition, women and men are not buried next to one another unless they are close family members or spouses. The cemetery also has unmarked plots for the burial of genizah.

Hebrew Sick Benefit Cemetery is one of nine Jewish cemeteries in the province of Manitoba to be documented by volunteers in a 15-year project that began in 1996. Under the auspices of the Jewish Heritage Centre of Western Canada, the project aimed to create a photographic record of every Jewish gravestone in the province, with a corresponding database.

In 1999, the cemetery was targeted by vandals who knocked down more than 200 headstones. Fifty of the stones were "shattered beyond repair", with overall damages estimated at $100,000. Police arrested five suspects between the ages of 15 and 21. Photographs of the headstones that had been taken by the volunteer cemetery photography project were used to reconstruct the names and dates on the headstones and correctly position replacement stones. In May 2014, vandalism to 20 headstones was discovered, with damages estimated at $40,000 to $60,000.

== World War II memorial ==
In September 1946, a memorial to Jewish servicemen killed in World War II was dedicated in the parking lot of the cemetery. The stone monument was engraved with the names of 63 Jewish members from all three military services. The memorial was commissioned by the Hebrew Sick Benefit Society and unveiled by Roland Fairbairn McWilliams, Lieutenant-Governor of Manitoba, in a ceremony that attracted more than 500 attendees.
