= Manitoba Highway 190 =

Provincial highway in Manitoba, Canada

Provincial Trunk Highway 190
- CentrePort Canada Way
- PTH 190 highlighted in red.

Route information
- Maintained by Manitoba Infrastructure
- Length: 9.5 km (5.9 mi)
- Existed: 2013–present

Major junctions
- West end: PTH 101 (Perimeter Highway)
- East end: Route 90 (Brookside Blvd) / Route 25 east (Inkster Blvd)

Location
- Country: Canada
- Province: Manitoba
- Rural municipalities: Rosser
- Major cities: Winnipeg

Highway system
- Provincial highways in Manitoba; Winnipeg City Routes
← PTH 110	→ PR 200

Provincial Trunk Highway 190 (PTH 190), also known as CentrePort Canada Way, is a provincial highway in the Canadian province of Manitoba. It connects the Perimeter Highway with Winnipeg Route 25 (Inkster Boulevard) in the City of Winnipeg; part of the highway passes through the neighbouring Rural Municipality of Rosser. The highway includes a traffic interchange at the junction with the Perimeter Highway, as well as a grade separation over the CP Rail main line. The highway is intended to service the industrial lands west of James Armstrong Richardson Winnipeg International Airport, which will be a part of the CentrePort Canada cargo hub. It is numbered for its ultimate role in connecting Highway 1 with Winnipeg Route 90.

PTH 190 is one of four three-digit urban expressway routes in the Manitoba highway network.

CentrePort Canada Way was opened to traffic on November 22, 2013. The expressway was officially opened at a ribbon cutting ceremony attended by Prime Minister Stephen Harper, Manitoba Premier Greg Selinger, and Diane Gray, CentrePort Canada President and CEO.

== Future ==
The Province of Manitoba has plans to extend CentrePort Canada Way west to the Highway 1 / Highway 26 intersection near St. François Xavier, bypassing the signalized intersections in Headingley and also referred to as the Headingley Bypass. No timeline has been set for construction.

== Major intersections ==
From west to east:

Location	km	mi	Destinations	Notes
Winnipeg	0.0	0.0	Perimeter Highway (PTH 101)	Partial cloverleaf interchange; exit 45 on PTH 101
Winnipeg	2.5	1.6	Sturgeon access	To Sturgeon Road
Rosser	5.4	3.4	Rosser Road (PR 221 west) / Sturgeon Road	
Rosser	8.9	5.5	Roy Roche Drive / Oak Point Highway	
Winnipeg	9.5	5.9	Brookside Boulevard (Route 90) to PTH 7 north – Airport Inkster Boulevard (Route 25 east)	Winnipeg city limit; continues as Route 25
1.000 mi = 1.609 km; 1.000 km = 0.621 mi
