= Winnipeg Route 62 =

City route in Winnipeg, Manitoba, Canada

Route 62
- Salter Street; Isabel Street; Balmoral Street; Colony Street; Memorial Boulevard; Osborne Street; Dunkirk Drive; Dakota Street
- Route 62 highlighted in red
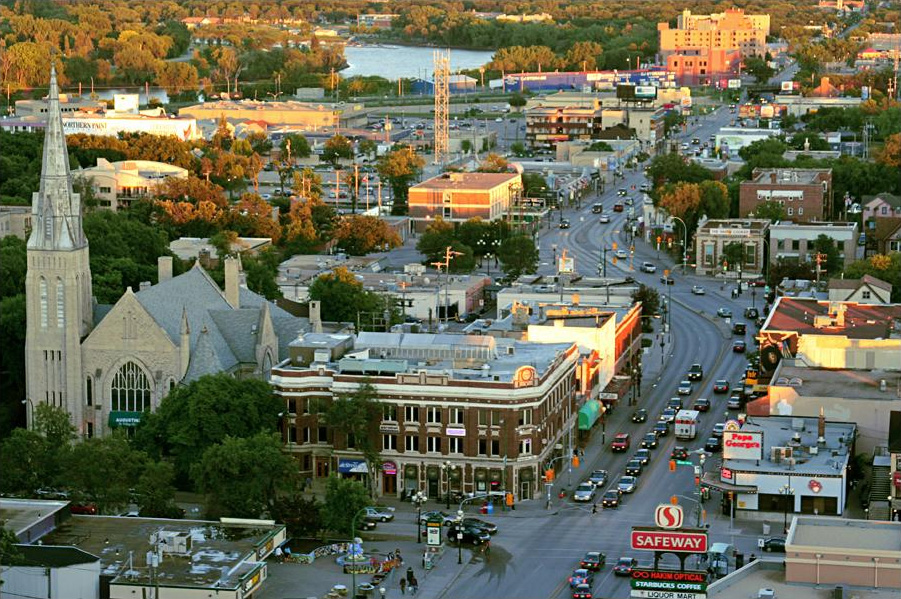
- Osborne St at River Ave, looking south

Route information
- Maintained by City of Winnipeg
- Length: 10.8 km (6.7 mi)
- Existed: 1966–present
- Known for: Confusion Corner, Osborne Village

Major junctions
- North end: Route 37 east (Redwood Ave)
- Route 47 (Logan Ave); Route 57 west (Notre Dame Ave); Route 57 east (Cumberland Ave); Route 85 (Portage Ave); PTH 1 (Broadway); Route 42 / Route 95 west; Route 125 west (Jubilee St); Route 135 east (Fermor Ave); Route 52 (St. Mary's Rd)
- South end: Route 165 (Abinojii Mikanah)

Location
- Country: Canada
- Province: Manitoba

Highway system
- Provincial highways in Manitoba; Winnipeg City Routes
← Route 57	→ Route 70

Route 62 is a major north–south arterial route in Winnipeg, Manitoba, that has eight different street names.

The route serves both the North End and St. Vital areas of Winnipeg, and forms the westernmost boundary of the downtown core. Osborne Street, between the Assiniboine and Red Rivers, is a major shopping district, especially in the area between Roslyn Road and Corydon Avenue, known as Osborne Village.

== Route description ==
The official route begins on Salter Street in the city's suburb of West Kildonan; its northernmost point is often given on maps as the intersection of Salter Street and Southall Drive. As it passes southward over the CPR Winnipeg Rail Yards and past the West End, its name changes from Salter Street to Isabel Street, Balmoral Street, Colony Street, Memorial Boulevard, and Osborne Street North, all in a space of less than 2 km (1.2 mi).

It remains as Osborne Street North as it passes by the Manitoba Legislative Building, and then as Osborne Street as it crosses over the Assiniboine River at the Osborne Bridge, through Confusion Corner and into Fort Rouge and Lord Roberts neighbourhoods past Arnold Avenue. The route's name changes to Dunkirk Drive when it enters the suburb of St. Vital at the St. Vital Bridge over the Red River, and again to Dakota Street when it crosses St. Mary's Road just north of St. Vital Centre. The route ends at the intersection of Dakota Street and Aldgate Road in the Dakota Crossing neighbourhood of south St. Vital.

== Major intersections ==
From north to south. The entire route is in Winnipeg.

Street Name	km	mi	Destinations	Notes
Salter Street	−3.8	−2.4	Beryl Watts Park	
Salter Street	−3.1	−1.9	Leila Avenue (Route 23 west)	One-way, westbound
Salter Street	−3.0	−1.9	Partridge Avenue (Route 23 east)	One-way, eastbound
Salter Street	−1.2	−0.75	Inkster Boulevard	Route 25 west
Salter Street	0.0	0.0	Redwood Avenue (Route 37 east)	Route 62 northern terminus; Route 37 western terminus
0.263	0.163	Burrows Avenue		
CPR Winnipeg Yards	1.2– 1.5	0.75– 0.93	Slaw Rebchuck Bridge Salter Street south end • Isabel Street north end	
Isabel Street	1.6	0.99	Logan Avenue (Route 47)	
Isabel Street	2.5	1.6	Notre Dame Avenue (Route 57 west)	One-way, westbound; Isabel Street south end; Balmoral Street north end
Balmoral Street	2.6	1.6	Cumberland Avenue (Route 57 east)	One-way, eastbound
Balmoral Street	3.2	2.0	Ellice Avenue	Balmoral Street south end; Colony Street north end
Colony Street	3.4	2.1	Portage Avenue (Route 85) / YH	Colony Street south end; Memorial Boulevard north end
Memorial Boulevard	3.7	2.3	St. Mary Avenue / Memorial Boulevard – Manitoba Legislative Building	One-way, westbound (St. Mary Avenue); Memorial Boulevard south end; Osborne Street north end
Osborne Street	3.8	2.4	York Avenue	One-way, eastbound
Osborne Street	4.0	2.5	Broadway (PTH 1) – Manitoba Legislative Building	
Assiniboine River	4.4– 4.6	2.7– 2.9	Osborne Bridge	
Osborne Street	5.3– 5.4	3.3– 3.4	Donald Street / Pembina Highway (Route 42); Corydon Avenue (Route 95 west)	Confusion Corner
Osborne Street	7.3	4.5	Jubilee Avenue (Route 125 west)	
Red River	7.6– 7.9	4.7– 4.9	St. Vital Bridge Osborne Street north end • Dunkirk Drive south end	
Dunkirk Drive	7.9	4.9	Kingston Row	Grade-separated
Dunkirk Drive	8.5	5.3	Fermor Avenue (Route 135 east)	No southbound entrance; to PTH 1 east
Dunkirk Drive	10.3	6.4	St. Mary's Road (Route 52)	Dunkirk Drive south end; Dakota Street north end
Dakota Street	10.8	6.7	Abinojii Mikanah (Route 165)	Route 62 southern terminus
Dakota Street	11.4	7.1	Meadowood Drive – St. Vital Centre	
Dakota Street	14.2	8.8	Aldgate Drive	Dakota Street southern terminus
1.000 mi = 1.609 km; 1.000 km = 0.621 mi: Closed/former; Incomplete access; Route transition
