= Winnipeg Route 135 =

City route in Winnipeg, Canada

Route 135
- Fermor Avenue
- Route 135 highlighted in red

Route information
- Maintained by City of Winnipeg
- Length: 7.0 km (4.3 mi)
- Existed: 1966–present
- Component highways: PTH 1 (Trans-Canada Highway)

Major junctions
- West end: Route 62 (Dunkirk Dr)
- Route 52 (St. Mary's Rd); PTH 1 / Route 150 (St. Anne's Rd); Route 30 (Archibald St); PTH 59 / Route 20 (Lagimodiere Blvd)
- East end: PTH 1 (TCH) east / Winnipeg city limit

Location
- Country: Canada
- Province: Manitoba

Highway system
- Provincial highways in Manitoba; Winnipeg City Routes
← Route 125	→ Route 145

Route 135, also known as Fermor Avenue, is a city route in Winnipeg, Manitoba. It runs from Dunkirk Drive to the Winnipeg city limit, through the suburbs of St. Vital and St. Boniface.

The route begins as a principal arterial road, passing through residential, commercial, and industrial areas before becoming an expressway with service roads east of Lagimodière Boulevard (Highway 59). The section between St. Anne's Road and the Perimeter Highway forms part of the Trans-Canada Highway (Highway 1) route through the city.

== Major intersections ==
From west to east:

Location	km	mi	Exit	Destinations	Notes
Winnipeg	0.0	0.0		Dunkirk Drive (Route 62)	No southbound exit
Winnipeg	0.7	0.43		St. Mary's Road (Route 52)	
Winnipeg	1.3	0.81		PTH 1 (TCH) west / St. Anne's Road (Route 150 north)	West end of PTH 1 concurrency
Winnipeg	2.6	1.6		Archibald Street (Route 30 north) / Roy Salinger Road	
Winnipeg	3.3	2.1		Autumwood Drive / Lakewood Boulevard	
Winnipeg	4.2	2.6		Westmount Drive / Beaverhill Boulevard	
Winnipeg	5.4	3.4		PTH 59 / Lagimodière Boulevard (Route 20)	
Winnipeg	7.0	4.3		Winnipeg city limits	Route 135 eastern terminus
R.M. Springfield	7.9	4.9	—	Plessis Road north	Interchange
R.M. Springfield	12.4	7.7	348	Perimeter Highway (PTH 100 west / PTH 101 north) – Brandon PTH 1 (TCH) east – Falcon Lake, Kenora	Interchange; signed as exits 348A (west) and 348B (north); PTH 100 / PTH 101 exit 1; PTH 1 continues east
1.000 mi = 1.609 km; 1.000 km = 0.621 mi: Closed/former; Concurrency terminus; Incomplete access
