= Winnipeg Route 180 =

City route in Winnipeg, Canada

Route 180
- McPhillips Street
- Route 180 highlighted in red
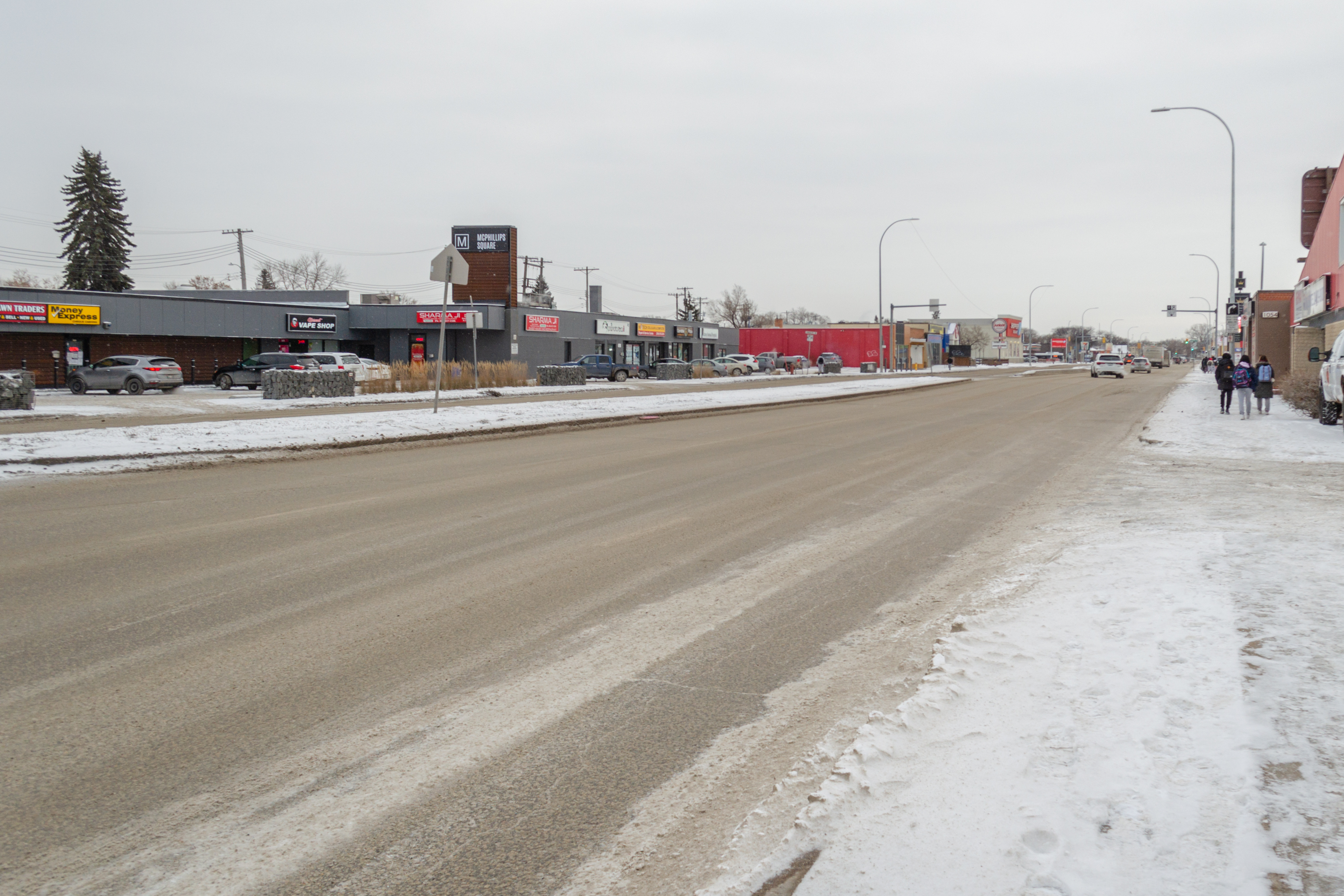
- McPhillips Street as seen from its intersection with Machray Avenue.

Route information
- Maintained by City of Winnipeg
- Length: 9.6 km (6.0 mi)
- Existed: 1966–present

Major junctions
- South end: Route 57 (Notre Dame Ave)
- Route 47 (Logan Ave); Route 25 (Inkster Blvd); Route 23 (Leila Ave)
- North end: PTH 8 north / Emes Road

Location
- Country: Canada
- Province: Manitoba

Highway system
- Provincial highways in Manitoba; Winnipeg City Routes
← Route 165	→ Route 17

Route 180 (locally known as McPhillips Street) is a major arterial road and city route in northwestern Winnipeg, Manitoba, Canada. It runs from Route 57 (Notre Dame Avenue) to Emes Avenue (Winnipeg city limits) near the Perimeter Highway, where it becomes Highway 8.

The route is the highest-numbered city route in Winnipeg. It serves as a connector to Highway 8 and Selkirk, Manitoba, from downtown Winnipeg via Notre Dame Ave. The speed limit is 60 km/h (37 mph) in the suburban area, except approaching the Perimeter where the speed limit becomes 80 km/h (50 mph).

Among other things, the route is home to the McPhillips Station Casino.

== History ==
George McPhillips (1848–1913) is commemorated by McPhillips Street in Winnipeg. The street was formerly the two-mile limit of the Selkirk Settlers' lots, which started at the Red River and extended from it for four miles. The first two miles were reserved for buildings and residential pursuits. Beyond the limit was pasture land. George Jr. came from a family of land surveyors. His father, George Sr., was the first generation of the Irish-Canadian family to perform this work in Western Canada. George Sr. arrived in Manitoba in 1872 and set up a surveying business, joined by George Jr. until 1875 when he and his brothers Robert Charles McPhillips and Francis McPhillips opened an office of their own, McPhillips Brothers. The firm was active during the Winnipeg boom of 1881–82. Another brother, Albert Edward McPhillips, was a lawyer in British Columbia and Henry McPhillips was a journalist.

In 1875, Winnipeg City Council authorized George Jr. to prepare an official map of the city, the first of its kind in the West. It was a difficult task because the few existing maps of subdivisions had to be revised and brought together. The first of these maps was done in January 1872 and comprised the homestead of James Ross, whose property extended from the Red River west to Princess Street. The width of the homestead was one city block, from James Avenue to Rupert Avenue. In the course of the project, McPhillips surveyed 625 streets, measuring 290 miles. The job gave him such publicity that, in 1883, Windsor, Ontario's council asked him to prepare a map of that city. He later returned to Winnipeg. He died at his home at 168 Kennedy Street on 20 November 1913, and was buried in St. Mary's Cemetery.

== Major intersections ==
Location	km	mi	Destinations	Notes
Winnipeg	0.0	0.0	Notre Dame Avenue (Route 57) – Downtown Winnipeg	Route 180 southern terminus
Winnipeg	0.5	0.31	William Avenue – Health Sciences Centre	
Winnipeg	1.0	0.62	Logan Avenue (Route 47)	
Winnipeg	2.4	1.5	Burrows Avenue	
Winnipeg	3.9	2.4	Inkster Boulevard (Route 25 west)	
Winnipeg	4.7	2.9	Jefferson Avenue	
Winnipeg	5.4	3.4	Kingsbury Avenue – Garden City Shopping Centre	
Winnipeg	5.8	3.6	Leila Avenue (Route 23)	
Winnipeg	9.6	6.0	PTH 8 begins / Emes Road	Winnipeg city limits; Route 180 northern terminus; PTH 8 southern terminus
R.M. West St. Paul	10.7	6.6	Perimeter Highway (PTH 101) PTH 8 north (McPhillips Street) – Gimli	Interchange, PTH 101 exit 69; PTH 8 continues north
1.000 mi = 1.609 km; 1.000 km = 0.621 mi: Closed/former; Route transition
