= Winnipeg Route 20 =

City route in Winnipeg, Canada

Route 20
- Lagimodière Boulevard
- Route 20 highlighted in red

Route information
- Maintained by City of Winnipeg
- Length: 16.4 km (10.2 mi)
- Existed: 1966–present
- Component highways: PTH 59

Major junctions
- South end: PTH 100 (TCH) (Perimeter Hwy)
- Route 165 west (Abinojii Mikanah); PTH 1 (TCH) / Route 135 (Fermor Ave); Route 115 west (Marion St); Route 115 east (Dugald Rd); Route 37 (Regent Ave W); Route 17 west (Chief Peguis Tr)
- North end: Winnipeg city limits

Location
- Country: Canada
- Province: Manitoba

Highway system
- Provincial highways in Manitoba; Winnipeg City Routes
← Route 17	→ Route 23

Route 20 (known locally as Lagimodière Boulevard) is a major north-south arterial route in the city of Winnipeg, Manitoba, Canada. It is also part of Manitoba Highway 59, the only Provincial Trunk Highway (other than the Trans-Canada Highway) that crosses through the city.

== Route description ==
At about 16.7 km (10.4 mi), it is one of the longest roads in the city. It begins in the northeast, running through the suburb of North Kildonan before becoming the boundary between the suburbs of East Kildonan and Transcona. South of the CNR Redditt line, it enters the eastern section of St. Boniface, passing by the CNR Symington Yards and the Royal Canadian Mint before crossing the Perimeter Highway and leaving the city in the extreme southern part of St. Boniface.

Route 20 maintains expressway standards through Winnipeg, generally as a 4-lane divided route, and has an 80 km/h (50 mph) speed limit for the most part, except for a brief section in the north end at Regent Avenue where the speed limit drops to 70 km/h (45 mph), and a section after the North Kildonan overpass where the speed limit raises to 90 km/h

== History ==
During the 1960s, Highway 59 between the Trans-Canada and the North Perimeter Highways was rebuilt to the east of its original route, which followed what is now Molson Street, Panet Road, Dawson Road, and Speers Road. Following its completion, the newly reconstructed road was named Lagimodière Boulevard, after Jean-Baptiste Lagimodière, an early pioneer of St. Boniface.

== Major intersections ==
Location	mi	km	Destinations	Notes
Winnipeg	0.0– 0.8	0.0– 0.50	PTH 59 south – St-Pierre-Jolys Perimeter Highway (PTH 100)	Interchange, PTH 100 exit 8; Route 20 southern terminus; south end of PTH 59 concurrency
Winnipeg	1.9	1.2	Sage Creek Boulevard	
Winnipeg	3.2	2.0	Abinojii Mikanah (Route 165 west)	
Winnipeg	4.9	3.0	PTH 1 (TCH) / Fermor Avenue (Route 135)	
Winnipeg	8.5	5.3	Marion Street (Route 115 west)	South end of Route 115 concurrency
Winnipeg	9.0	5.6	Dugald Road (Route 115 east)	North end of Route 115 concurrency
Winnipeg	10.4	6.5	Regent Avenue (Route 37)	
Winnipeg	12.1	7.5	Concordia Avenue	Interchange
Winnipeg	13.5	8.4	Grassie Boulevard	
Winnipeg	14.1	8.8	Route 17 west (Chief Peguis Trail)	
Winnipeg	16.4	10.2	Winnipeg city limits	Route 20 northern terminus; north end of PTH 59 concurrency
East St. Paul	16.4– 17.5	10.2– 10.9	Perimeter Highway (PTH 101) PTH 59 north – Grand Beach	Interchange, PTH 101 exit 76
1.000 mi = 1.609 km; 1.000 km = 0.621 mi: Closed/former; Concurrency terminus
