= Winnipeg Route 165 =

City route in Winnipeg

Route 165
- Abinojii Mikanah
- Route 165 highlighted in red

Route information
- Maintained by City of Winnipeg
- Length: 10.9 km (6.8 mi)
- Existed: 1978–present

Major junctions
- West end: Route 90 (Kenaston Blvd)
- Route 80 (Waverley St); Route 42 (Pembina Hwy); Route 52 (St. Mary's Rd); Route 62 (Dakota St); Route 150 (St. Anne's Rd)
- East end: PTH 59 / Route 20 (Lagimodiere Blvd)

Location
- Country: Canada
- Province: Manitoba

Highway system
- Provincial highways in Manitoba; Winnipeg City Routes
← Route 155	→ Route 180

Route 165, named Abinojii Mikanah (Ojibwe: ᐊᐱᓄᒌ ᒥᑲᓇᐦ, romanized: Abinojii mikanah, lit. 'Children's Road'), formerly Bishop Grandin Boulevard, is a highway in Winnipeg, Manitoba.

Currently the route is an at-grade expressway running from an interchange with Kenaston Boulevard (Route 90) to Lagimodiere Boulevard (PTH 59 / Route 20). The route runs through the districts of Fort Garry, St. Vital, and St. Boniface.

The speed limit along the route is 80 km/h (50 mph).

== History ==
Abinojii Mikanah first opened to traffic from Lagimodiere Boulevard (PTH 59 / Route 20) to Pembina Highway (Route 42) in 1978, with a westerly extension to Route 80 (Waverley Street) opening in 1990, as well as a second expansion in 1998 expanding from waverley to Route 90.

In the wake of the 2021 discovery of unmarked burial sites at the former Kamloops Indian Residential School in BC, there were calls to change the name of the roadway, originally called Bishop Grandin Boulevard after Vital-Justin Grandin, who is now seen as one of the primary architects of the residential school system. On March 23, 2023, Winnipeg city council voted unanimously to change the name of the street to Abinojii Mikanah (Children's Road in Ojibwemowin, one of the local First Nations languages), "to represent residential school survivors and the journey to find the children who never returned home." On April 26, 2024, it was announced that bylaws pertaining to the rename had received second and third readings at city council.

== Major intersections ==
From west to east: The entire route is in Winnipeg.

km	mi	Destinations	Notes
0.0	0.0	Kenaston Boulevard (Route 90)	Grade separated seagull intersection
2.5	1.6	Waverley Street (Route 80)	
2.9	1.8	Pembina Highway (Route 42)	Partial cloverleaf interchange; to PTH 75 south
3.7	2.3	Fort Garry Bridge crosses the Red River	
4.0	2.5	River Road	Split intersection
5.9	3.7	St. Mary's Road (Route 52)	
6.4	4.0	Dakota Street (Route 62)	
7.7	4.8	St. Anne's Road (Route 150)	
8.5	5.3	Shorehill Drive	
9.2	5.7	Lakewood Boulevard	
9.7	6.0	Island Shore Boulevard	
10.3	6.4	Boulevard de la Seigneurie	
10.9	6.8	Lagimodiere Boulevard (Route 20) / PTH 59	
1.000 mi = 1.609 km; 1.000 km = 0.621 mi

== See also ==
- List of Winnipeg City Routes
