= Winnipeg Route 52 =

City route in Winnipeg, Canada

Route 52
- St. Mary's Road; Queen Elizabeth Way; Main Street
- Route 52 highlighted in red

Route information
- Maintained by City of Winnipeg
- Length: 21.2 km (13.2 mi)
- Existed: 1966–present
- Known for: Junction of Portage and Main

Major junctions
- South end: PTH 100 (TCH) (Perimeter Hwy) / PR 200 south (St. Mary's Rd)
- Route 165 (Abinojii Mikanah); Route 62 (Dunkirk Dr / Dakota St); Route 135 (Fermor Ave); PTH 1 (TCH) east / Route 150 (St. Anne's Rd); Route 115 (Marion St); PTH 1 (TCH) west (Broadway); Route 57 / Route 85 (Portage Ave); Route 42 (Disraeli Fwy); Route 47 (Logan Ave); Route 37 (Redwood Ave); Route 23 west (Leila Ave); Route 17 east (Chief Peguis Tr)
- North end: PTH 9 north / Winnipeg city limits

Location
- Country: Canada
- Province: Manitoba

Highway system
- Provincial highways in Manitoba; Winnipeg City Routes
← Route 47	→ Route 57

Route 52 is a major north-south arterial route in Winnipeg, Manitoba, Canada. It comprises all of Main Street, Queen Elizabeth Way, and St. Mary's Road.

== Route description ==
Route 52 begins at the south Perimeter Highway (Manitoba Highway 100) and along St. Mary's Road as the northern continuation of Manitoba Provincial Road 200. It follows the east side of the Red River to the Norwood Bridge, it crosses the river and becomes Queen Elizabeth Way. It continues to the Main Street Bridge over the Assiniboine River, where it enters downtown and becomes Main Street. After passing through downtown, it runs along the west bank of the Red River to its northern terminus at the Winnipeg city limits, just south of the north Perimeter Highway (Manitoba Highway 101), and becomes Manitoba Highway 9.

Route 52 passes through the suburbs of West Kildonan, the North End, Downtown, Fort Rouge, St. Boniface, and St. Vital. The section between Broadway and St. Anne's Road is part of Manitoba Highway 1, the Trans-Canada Highway.

Many of Winnipeg's most prominent buildings and institutions are located along Main Street, including City Hall, the Centennial Concert Hall, the Manitoba Museum, Union Station, the Richardson Building, 360 Main (formerly the Commodities Exchange tower) and the historic VJ's Drive Inn.

== History ==
Main Street is one of the oldest routes in the Winnipeg region. It originated as the trail between Lower Fort Garry and the various settlements huddled around the confluence of the Red and Assiniboine Rivers. Its intersection with the Portage Trail near Upper Fort Garry (now downtown Winnipeg) spawned the Portage and Main corner, which is today the heart of the city. Upper Fort Garry was eventually demolished by the city in order to straighten the southern portion of Main Street and realign it to its current configuration. The north gate, the sole surviving piece of Upper Fort Garry, stands near the corner of Broadway and Main.

St. Mary's Road is named after St. Mary's Parish (Ste. Marie Paroisse in French), a Roman Catholic parish located in the northernmost section of St. Vital. It was originally a trail that led from the parish south to the United States border at Emerson along the east side of the Red River. In rural Manitoba, St. Mary's Road is now incorporated into Provincial Roads 200 and 246.

A short section of Main Street was renamed Queen Elizabeth Way to commemorate the 2002 Royal Visit of Queen Elizabeth II to the city.

== Photo gallery ==
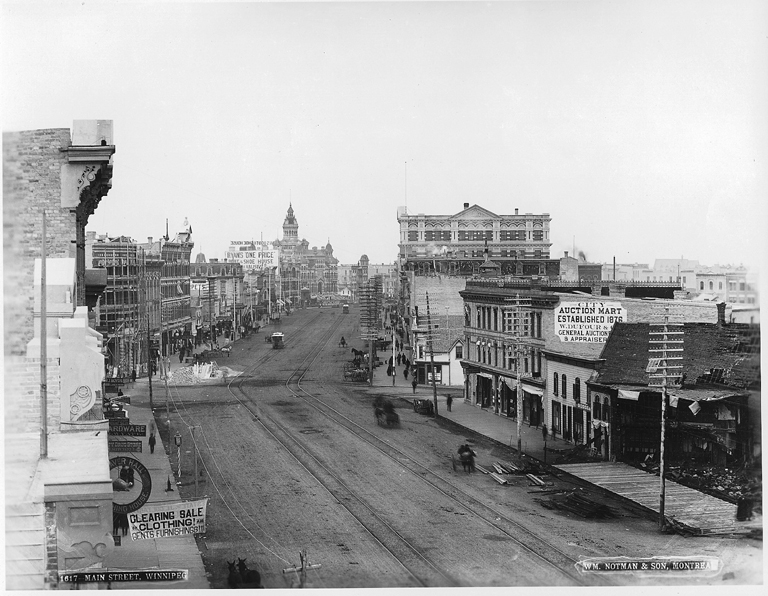
Main Street in 1887 (at Pioneer Avenue, looking north)

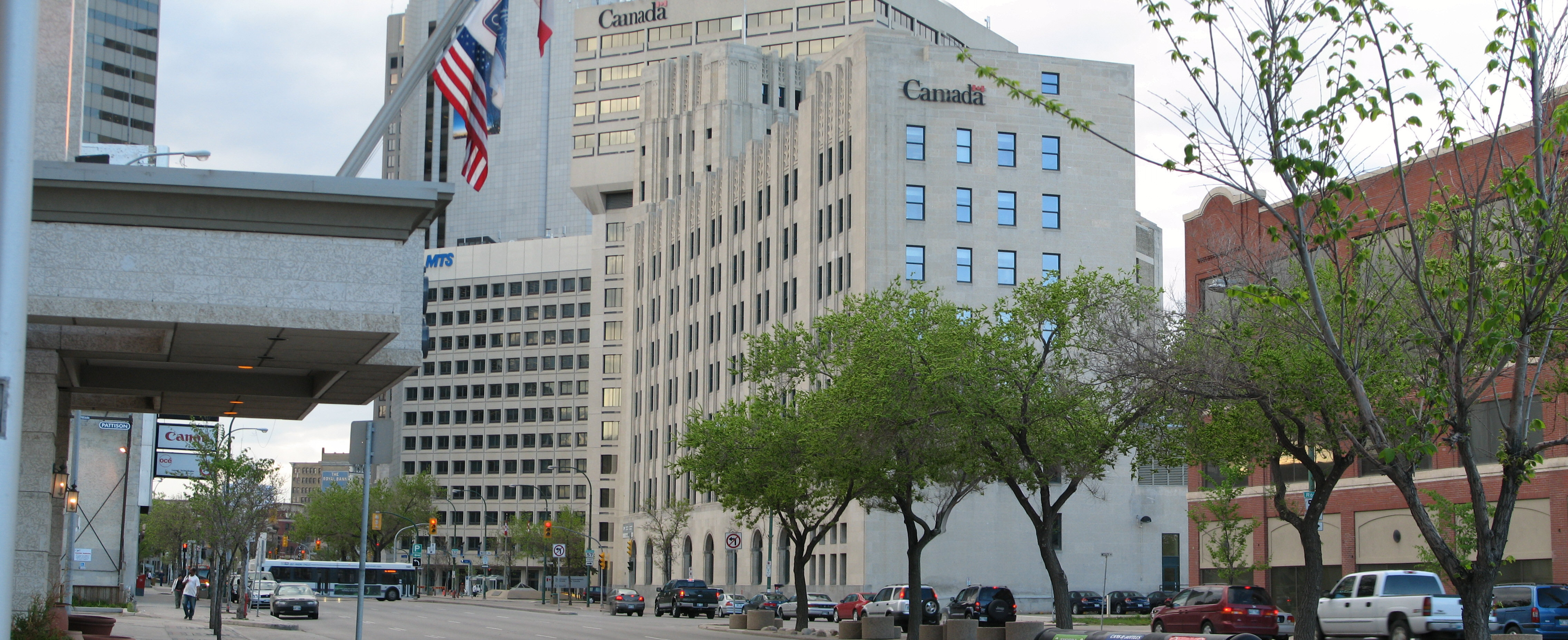
Looking north on Main Street at St. Mary Avenue

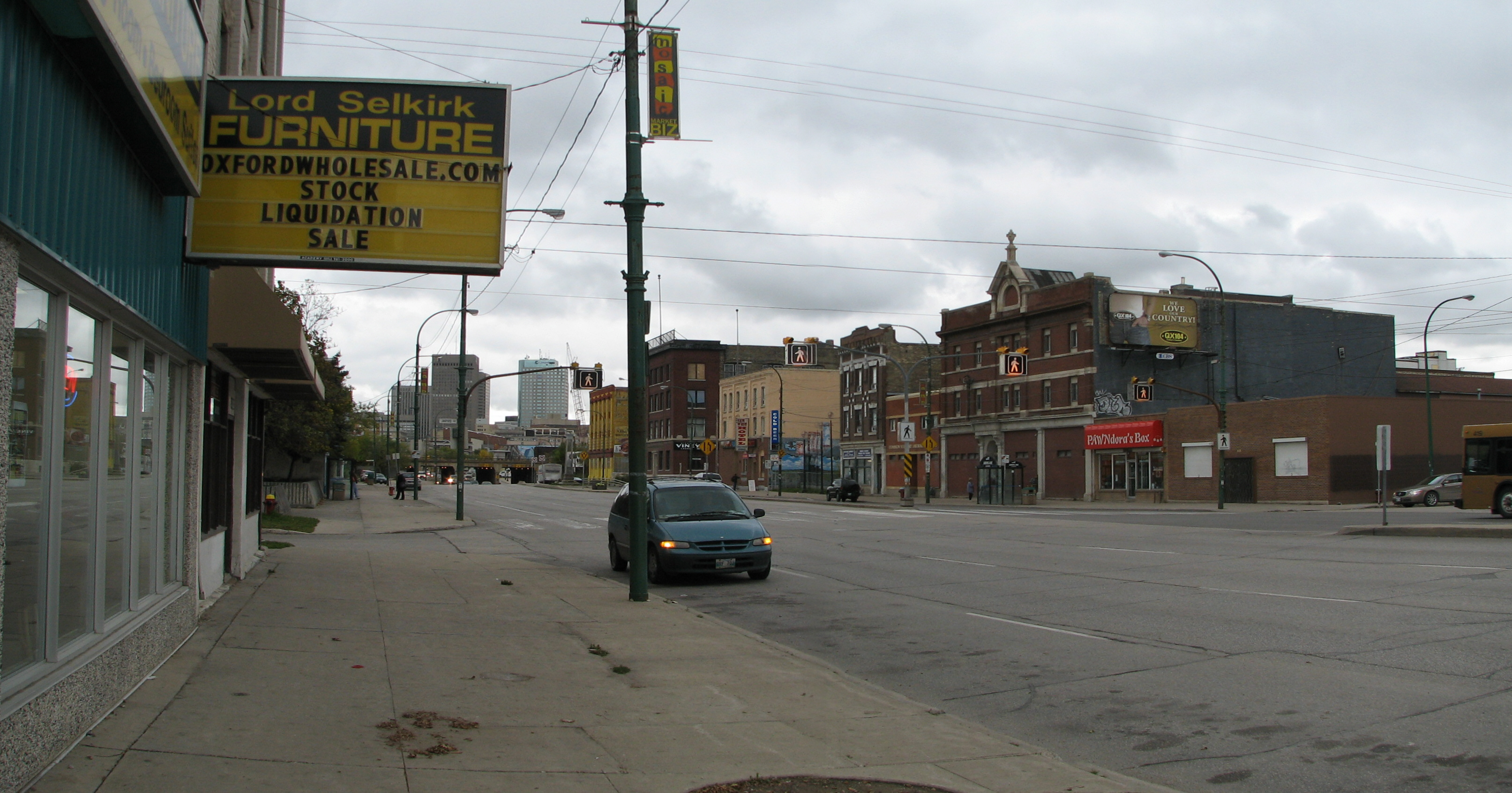
Main Street at Jarvis Avenue, looking south towards downtown

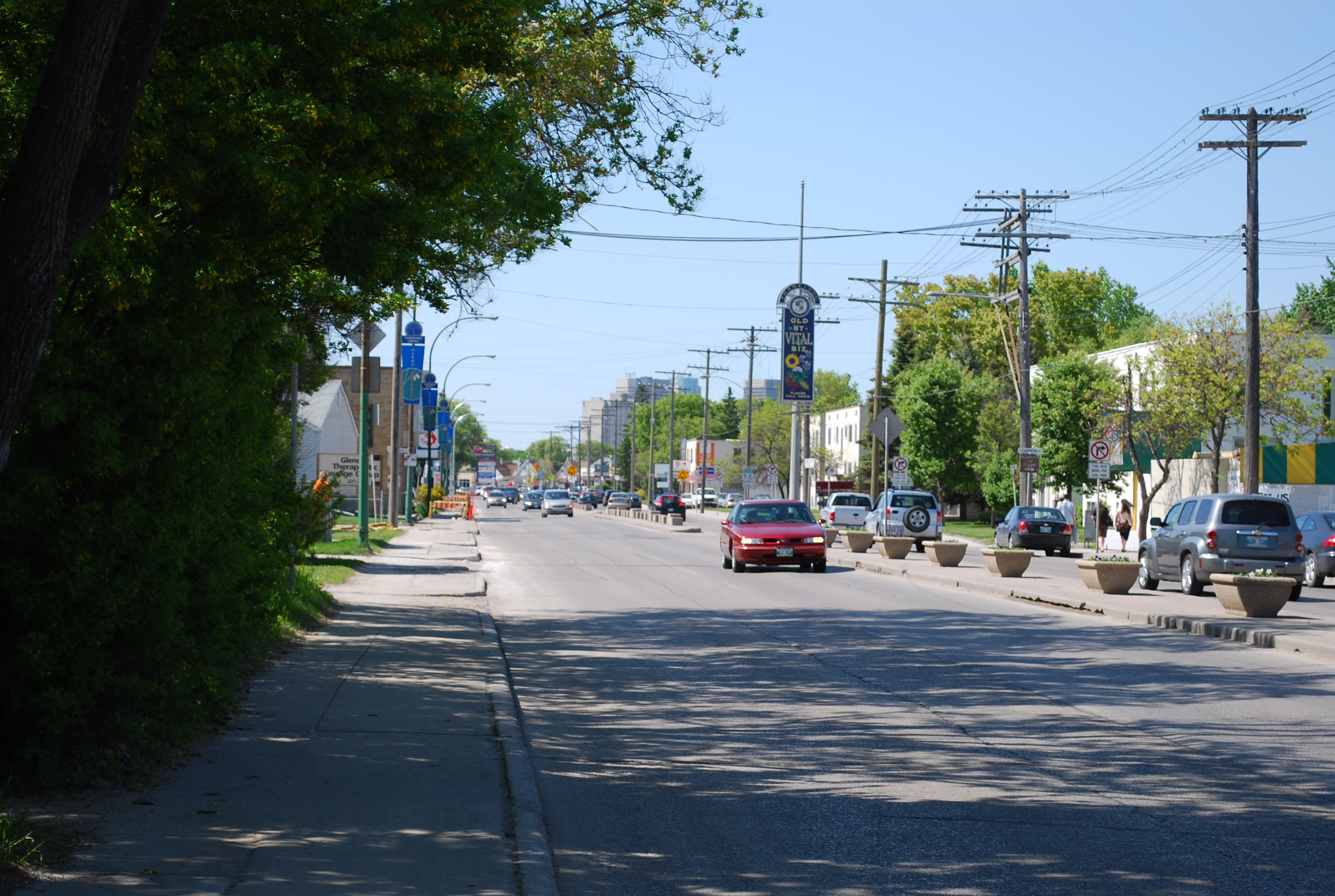
St. Mary's Road at Carriere Avenue, looking north toward downtown

== Major intersections ==
From south to north. The entire route is in Winnipeg.

Street Name	km	mi	Destinations	Notes
St. Mary's Road	0.0	0.0	PR 200 south (St. Mary's Road) – St. Adolphe Perimeter Highway (PTH 100 (TCH)) – Brandon, Kenora	Route 52 southern terminus; dogbone interchange; continues as PR 200
St. Mary's Road	3.6	2.2	Meadowood Drive – St. Vital Centre	
St. Mary's Road	4.3	2.7	Abinojii Mikanah (Route 165)	
St. Mary's Road	4.9	3.0	Dunkirk Drive / Dakota Street (Route 62)	
St. Mary's Road	6.8	4.2	Fermor Avenue (Route 135)	To PTH 1 east
St. Mary's Road	8.1	5.0	PTH 1 east / St. Anne's Road (Route 150 south)	South end of PTH 1 concurrency
St. Mary's Road	9.9	6.2	Tache Avenue / Enfield Cresecent	Northbound access to Route 115 east
St. Mary's Road	10.5	6.5	Marion Street (Route 115 east)	No northbound access
Red River	10.6– 10.8	6.6– 6.7	Norwood Bridge St. Mary's Road north end • Queen Elizabeth Way south end	
Queen Elizabeth Way	10.9	6.8	River Avenue (via Stradbrook Avenue)	No northbound entrance; Stradbrook Avenue alignment, signed as River Avenue
Queen Elizabeth Way	11.0	6.8	Mayfair Avenue	One-way eastbound (no access, T-intersection); northbound entrance from Stradbrook Avenue
Assiniboine River	11.0– 11.1	6.8– 6.9	Main Street Bridge Queen Elizabeth Way north end • Main Street south end	
Main Street	11.5	7.1	Broadway (PTH 1 west) – Manitoba Legislative Building	North end of PTH 1 concurrency; passes Union Station
Main Street	11.7	7.3	York Avenue – The Forks	One-way eastbound west of Main Street
Main Street	11.9	7.4	St. Mary Avenue	One-way, westbound
Main Street	12.0	7.5	Graham Avenue	
Main Street	12.1	7.5	To Route 57 east / William Stephenson Way – The Forks	One-way, eastbound
Main Street	12.2	7.6	Pioneer Avenue	One-way, westbound (no access, T-intersection)
Main Street	12.3	7.6	Portage Avenue (Route 57) / Route 85 west / YH west	See Portage and Main; Yellowhead Highway eastern terminus; to PTH 1 west
Main Street	12.5	7.8	McDermot Avenue	One-way, eastbound
Main Street	12.6	7.8	Bannatyne Avenue	One-way, westbound
Main Street	12.8	8.0	James Avenue (Route 42 east)	One-way eastbound (no access, T-intersection); south end of Route 42 east concurrency
Main Street	13.0	8.1	Disraeli Freeway / Alexander Avenue (Route 42)	No southbound to eastbound exit; Alexander Avenue is one-way, westbound; north end of Route 42 east concurrency
Main Street	13.1	8.1	Logan Avenue (Route 47)	Southbound access to Route 42 east
Main Street	13.4	8.3	Higgins Avenue	
Main Street	14.8	9.2	Redwood Avenue (Route 37)	
Main Street	16.1	10.0	Inkster Boulevard	To Route 25 west
Main Street	17.8	11.1	Partridge Avenue (Route 23 east)	One-way eastbound (no access, T-intersection); Route 23 eastern terminus
Main Street	17.9	11.1	Leila Avenue (Route 23 west)	One-way westbound east of Main Street
Main Street	19.2	11.9	Chief Peguis Trail (Route 17)	
Main Street	21.2	13.2	PTH 9 begins	Winnipeg city limits; Route 52 northern terminus; PTH 9 southern terminus
R.M. West St. Paul	22.3	13.9	PTH 101 (Perimeter Highway) PTH 9 north (Main Street) – Selkirk	Interchange; PTH 101 exit 71; PTH 9 continues north
1.000 mi = 1.609 km; 1.000 km = 0.621 mi: Concurrency terminus; Incomplete access; Route transition
