= Winnipeg Route 125 =

City route in Winnipeg, Canada

Route 125
- Jubilee Avenue
- Route 125 highlighted in red

Route information
- Maintained by City of Winnipeg
- Length: 1.6 km (0.99 mi)
- Existed: 1966–present

Major junctions
- West end: Route 42 (Pembina Hwy)
- East end: Route 62 (Osborne St)

Location
- Country: Canada
- Province: Manitoba

Highway system
- Provincial highways in Manitoba; Winnipeg City Routes
← Route 115	→ Route 135

Route 125 (Jubilee Avenue) is a city route in Winnipeg, Manitoba, Canada. At only 1.6 kilometers in length, it is the shortest designated city route, running from an interchange with Route 42 (Pembina Highway) to Route 62 (Osborne Street).

Jubilee Avenue is a collector road with two lanes in each direction, running through residential areas in Fort Garry and Fort Rouge. The speed limit is 50 km/h (30 mph) for the entire length of the route. The street is named in commemoration of Queen Victoria's Diamond Jubilee in 1897.

== Major intersections ==
The entire route is in Winnipeg.

km	mi	Destinations	Notes
0.0	0.0	Pembina Highway (Route 42)	Interchange
1.6	0.99	Osborne Street (Route 62)	
1.000 mi = 1.609 km; 1.000 km = 0.621 mi

== Notable Locations ==
- Bridge Drive In (BDI)
- Elm Park Bridge
