= Winnipeg Route 42 =

Arterial road in Manitoba, Canada

Route 42
- Pembina Highway; Donald Street / Smith Street; Princess Street / King Street; Disraeli Freeway; Henderson Highway; James Ave; Alexander Ave; McMillan Ave; Corydon Ave
- Route 42 highlighted in red

Route information
- Maintained by City of Winnipeg
- Length: 26.7 km (16.6 mi)
- Existed: 1966–present
- Known for: Confusion Corner

Major junctions
- South end: PTH 75 south / Turnbull Dr east
- PTH 100 (TCH) (Perimeter Hwy); Route 165 (Abinojii Mikanah); Route 155 west (McGillivray Blvd); Route 125 east (Jubilee Ave); Route 70 north (Stafford St); Route 105 west (Grant Ave); Route 62 / Route 95 west; PTH 1 (TCH) (Broadway); Route 85 / Route 57 east (Portage Ave); Route 57 west (Notre Dame Ave); Route 52 (Main St); Route 47 west (Logan Ave); Route 37 (Hespeler Ave / Johnson Ave W); Route 17 (Chief Peguis Tr)
- North end: PTH 101 (Perimeter Hwy) / PR 204 north

Location
- Country: Canada
- Province: Manitoba

Highway system
- Provincial highways in Manitoba; Winnipeg City Routes
← Route 37	→ Route 47

Route 42 is a major arterial road located in Winnipeg, Manitoba.

It connects the suburbs of North Kildonan, East Kildonan, Fort Rouge, Fort Garry, and St. Norbert with the city's downtown core. In the north, it is a continuation of Manitoba Provincial Road 204 (PR 204); in the south, it is a continuation of PTH 75 (or Lord Selkirk Highway).

The route is commonly known as Pembina Highway between PTH 75 to Donald Street; as the Disraeli Freeway between Main Street and Talbot Avenue; and as Henderson Highway from Talbot to PR 204.

== Route description ==
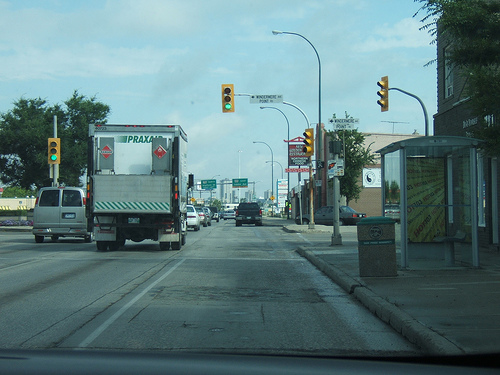
Pembina Hwy at Point Rd, looking north towards Route 125 and downtown.

The route begins at PTH 75 and Turnbull Drive in the suburb of St. Norbert and, as Pembina Highway, crosses the Perimeter Highway South, and runs north-northwest through Fort Garry (passing by the University of Manitoba). At Confusion Corner, it takes the name Donald Street until it crosses the Assiniboine River at the Midtown Bridge, and splits into two one-way streets; southbound traffic continues along Donald Street and northbound traffic follows Smith Street.

At Notre Dame Avenue, it becomes King Street (northbound) and Princess Street (southbound) until it crosses Main Street and becomes the Disraeli Freeway, continuing northeast, passing through the neighbourhood of Point Douglas and crosses the Red River at the Disraeli Bridge, where it becomes Henderson Highway. Running north along the east bank of the Red River, it passes Hespeler Avenue and Chief Peguis Trail to Perimeter Highway North where it leaves the city as Provincial Road 204.

=== Disraeli Bridges ===
Disraeli Bridges
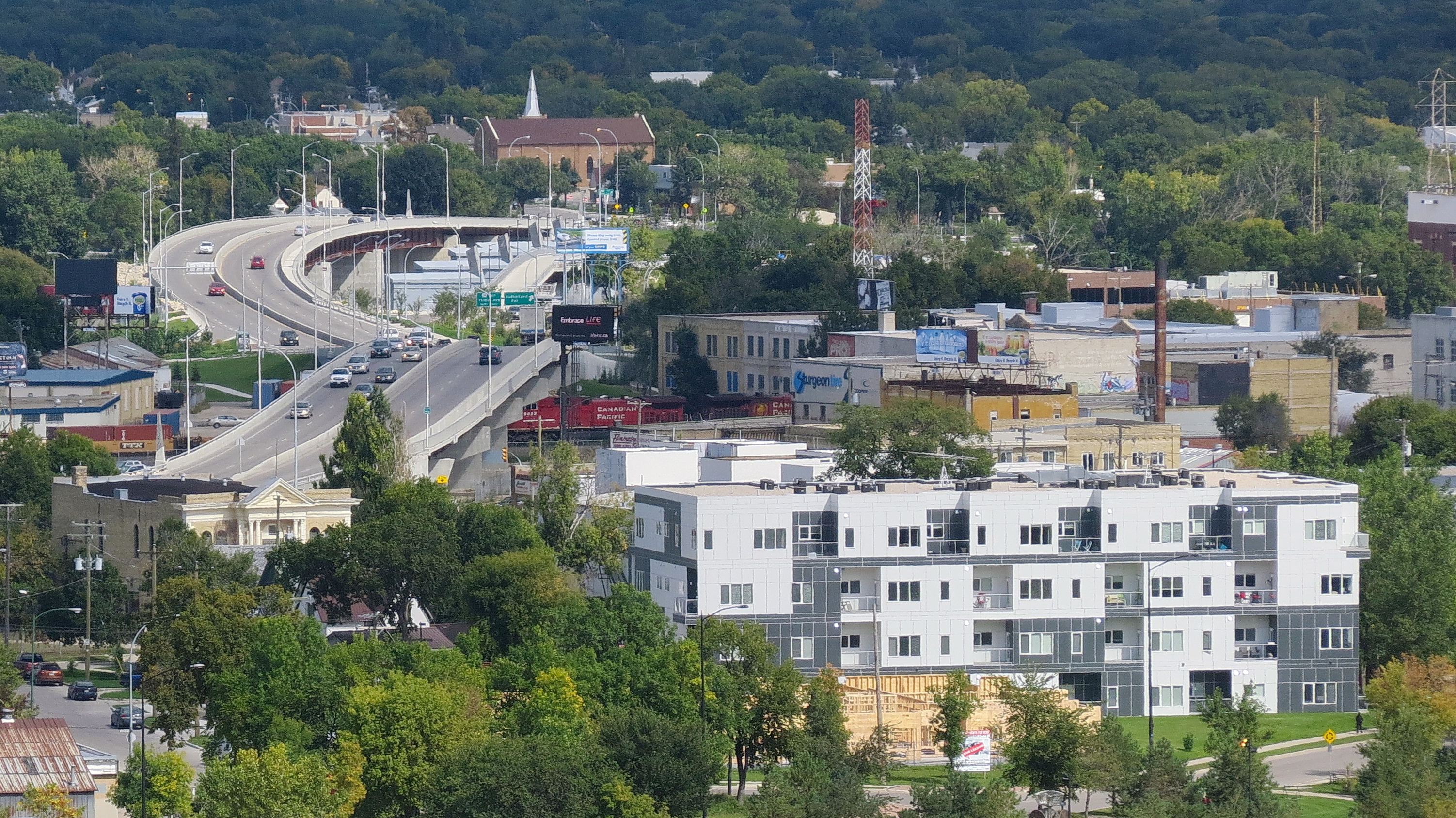
- The Disraeli Freeway, facing north
- Named for: Benjamin Disraeli

History
- Built: 1959/60
- Construction cost: $195 million (rehabilitation)
- Rebuilt: 2010

Between Main Street and the south end of Henderson Highway, route 42 is known as the Disraeli Freeway, named after Benjamin Disraeli. The freeway includes the Disraeli Bridges, which stretch over the Red River and are integral in connecting the city's downtown and northeastern areas.

Originally constructed in 1959/60, the bridges were authorized for rehabilitation in 2008, and subsequently became Winnipeg's largest bridge project in history (current as of 2020).

Construction of the new bridges began in January 2010 with a cost of $195 million, and a minimum of four bridge lanes remained open the entire time. Funded through a Public-Private Partnership arrangement, the federal government provided $18.3 million (and an additional $53.3 m) for the infrastructure project, with the private Plenary Roads Winnipeg consortium being chosen to design, build, finance, and maintain the roadway.

Key features of the project included:

- 2 km (1.2 mi) of new roads for the Disraeli Freeway, between Main Street and Hespeler Avenue;
- new bridge structures to cross the Red River and Canadian Pacific mainline;
- reorganization and improvement of vehicular access and exit points; and
- revitalized landscaping and entrance points for adjacent communities.

The project was officially opened on 19 October 2012.

== Names ==
The namesakes of the various roads making up Route 42 are as follows:

- Pembina Highway, together with PTH 75, originated as the Pembina Trail, which was used by early settlers to travel between the Selkirk Settlement and Fort Pembina.
- Donald and Smith Streets are named for the 1st Lord Strathcona.
- King Street is named for John Mark King, a local clergyman.
- Princess Street is named for Princess Louise, Duchess of Argyll.
- Disraeli Freeway is named for Benjamin Disraeli.
- Henderson Highway is named for early Manitoba pioneer Samuel Robert Henderson.

== Major intersections ==
The entire route is in Winnipeg.

Street Name	km	mi	Destinations	Notes
Pembina Highway	0.0	0.0	PTH 75 south (Lord Selkirk Highway) – Morris, Emerson Turnbull Drive / Father Labonte Avenue	Winnipeg city limits; south end of PTH 75 concurrency; Route 42 southern terminus; to I-29 / US 81
Pembina Highway	2.8	1.7	Perimeter Highway (PTH 100 (TCH)) / PTH 75 ends – Brandon, Kenora	Grade separated; PTH 75 northern terminus; signed as exits 94A (east) and 94B (west); PTH 100 exit 18
Pembina Highway	3.3	2.1	Bairdmore Boulevard / Dalhousie Drive	
Pembina Highway	4.7	2.9	Bairdmore Boulevard / Dalhousie Drive	
Pembina Highway	5.5	3.4	Bison Drive / Chancellor Matheson Road – University of Manitoba, Investors Group Field	
Pembina Highway	7.4	4.6	University Crescent – University of Manitoba	
Pembina Highway	7.5	4.7	Abinojii Mikanah (Route 165)	Grade separated
Pembina Highway	10.0	6.2	McGillivray Boulevard (Route 155 west) / Oakenwald Avenue	
Pembina Highway	11.3	7.0	Jubilee Avenue (Route 125 east)	Grade separated
Pembina Highway	11.7	7.3	Stafford Street (Route 70 north)	
Pembina Highway	12.0	7.5	Taylor Avenue	
Pembina Highway	12.7	7.9	Grant Avenue (Route 105 west)	
Corydon Avenue (northbound); McMillan Avenue (northbound)	13.7– 14.1	8.5– 8.8	Osborne Street (Route 62) / Corydon Avenue (Route 95 west)	Confusion Corner (Osborne Junction); Route 42 follows Corydon Avenue (northbound) and McMillan Avenue (northbound) through Confusion Corner; Donald Street south end
Donald Street	14.6	9.1	Stradbrook Avenue	One-way, eastbound
Donald Street	14.9	9.3	River Avenue	One-way, westbound
Assiniboine River	15.1	9.4	Midtown Bridge	
Smith Street (northbound); Donald Street (northbound)	15.5	9.6	One-way transition	Route 42 north follows Smith Street
Smith Street (northbound); Donald Street (northbound)	15.5	9.6	Broadway (PTH 1)	
Smith Street (northbound); Donald Street (northbound)	15.7	9.8	York Avenue	One-way, eastbound
Smith Street (northbound); Donald Street (northbound)	15.9	9.9	St. Mary Avenue	One-way, westbound
Smith Street (northbound); Donald Street (northbound)	16.1	10.0	Graham Avenue	Transit only
Smith Street (northbound); Donald Street (northbound)	16.3	10.1	Portage Avenue (Route 85) / Route 57 east / YH	
Smith Street (northbound); Donald Street (northbound)	16.4	10.2	Ellice Avenue	
Smith Street (northbound); Donald Street (northbound)	16.5	10.3	Cumberland Avenue	One-way, eastbound (no access); southbound entrance only
King Street (northbound); Donald Street (southbound)	16.55	10.28	Smith Street, King Street	Route 42 north turns north onto King Street
King Street (northbound); Princess Street (southbound)	16.6	10.3	Notre Dame Avenue (Route 57 west) / King Street	One-way, westbound; Donald Street north end and Princess Street south end (southbound)
King Street (northbound); Princess Street (southbound)	16.9	10.5	William Avenue	
James Avenue (northbound); Princess Street (southbound)	17.1	10.6	James Avenue, King Street	One-way, eastbound; Route 42 north turns onto James Avenue
Main Street (northbound); Princess Street (southbound)	17.2	10.7	Main Street (Route 52)	Route 42 north branches north onto Main Street; south end of Route 42 north / Route 52 north concurrency
Main Street (northbound); Alexander Avenue (southbound)	17.3	10.7	Alexander Avenue, Princess Street	Route 42 south branches turns onto Princess Street from Alexander Avenue
Disraeli Freeway	17.4	10.8	Main Street (Route 52) / Alexander Avenue	North end of Route 42 north / Route 52 north concurrency; Route 42 south follows Alexander Avenue; Disraeli Freeway south end
Disraeli Freeway	17.6	10.9	Logan Avenue (Route 47 west)	
Disraeli Freeway	18.5	11.5	Sutherland Avenue	Grade separated
Red River	18.8	11.7	Disraeli Bridge	
Henderson Highway	19.0	11.8	Talbot Avenue / Midwinter Avenue (Route 37 east)	Grade separated; south end of Route 37 east concurrency; signed as Talbot Avenue (northbound) and Midwinter Avenue (southbound); Disraeli Freeway north end; Henderson Highway south end
Henderson Highway	19.4	12.1	Hespeler Avenue (Route 37 west)	North end of Route 37 east concurrency; south end of Route 37 west concurrency
Henderson Highway	19.6	12.2	Johnson Avenue (Route 37 east)	North end of Route 37 west concurrency
Henderson Highway	20.5	12.7	Munroe Avenue	
Henderson Highway	22.6	14.0	McLeod Avenue	
Henderson Highway	23.9	14.9	Chief Peguis Trail (Route 17)	
Henderson Highway	24.9	15.5	McIvor Avenue	
Henderson Highway	25.9	16.1	PR 204 begins / Glenway Avenue	Winnipeg city limits; Route 42 northern terminus; PR 204 southern terminus
R.M. East St. Paul	26.7	16.6	Perimeter Highway (PTH 101) PR 204 north (Henderson Highway) – Lockport, Selkirk	Grade separated; PTH 101 exit 72; PR 204 continues north; former PTH 9 north
1.000 mi = 1.609 km; 1.000 km = 0.621 mi: Closed/former; Concurrency terminus; HOV only; Incomplete access; Route transition
