= Winnipeg Route 80 =

City route in Winnipeg, Canada

Route 80
- Waverley Street
- Route 80 highlighted in red

Route information
- Maintained by City of Winnipeg
- Length: 9.3 km (5.8 mi)
- Existed: 1966–present

Major junctions
- South end: Route 90 (Kenaston Blvd)
- Route 165 (Abinojii Mikanah); Route 155 (McGillivray Blvd); Route 145 west (Wilkes Ave)
- North end: Route 105 (Grant Ave)

Location
- Country: Canada
- Province: Manitoba

Highway system
- Provincial highways in Manitoba; Winnipeg City Routes
← Route 70	→ Route 85

Route 80, locally known as Waverley Street, is a major arterial road in the southwest portion of Winnipeg, Manitoba, Canada. It runs from Kenaston Boulevard (Route 90) to Grant Avenue (Route 105).

Waverley Street serves as a major route to get to and from the industrial and commercial areas between McGillivray Blvd and Abinojii Mikanah. The speed limit along the route south of Wilkes Avenue is 80 km/h (50 mph). Near Taylor Avenue, Waverley previously crossed the city's Canadian National Railway main line, where passing trains frequently caused major traffic delays. The city has since built an underpass to alleviate the problem, planned which opened in the Summer of 2019.

Not all of Waverley Street is incorporated into Route 80. North of Grant Avenue, Waverley Street is a one-way residential street running southbound through the River Heights neighbourhood, starting at Wellington Crescent. South of the Perimeter Highway, Waverley Street is as an unnumbered local road that runs south to Provincial Road 247. Prior to the extension of Route 90 to the Perimeter Highway, this section connected to Route 80 at the Perimeter Highway.

In August 2019, the much anticipated Waverley Underpass was opened for use, one year ahead of schedule and under budget.

== Major intersections ==
From north to south; all intersections are at-grade unless otherwise indicated: The entire route is in Winnipeg.

km	mi	Destinations	Notes
−2.1	−1.3	Wellington Crescent	Waverley Street northern terminus
−1.95	−1.21	Academy Road	
−0.8	−0.50	Corydon Avenue (Route 95)	
0.0	0.0	Grant Avenue (Route 105)	Route 80 northern terminus
0.5	0.31	Taylor Avenue	
1.0	0.62	Wilkes Avenue (Route 145 west) / Hurst Way	
1.5	0.93	Victor Lewis Drive	
1.95	1.21	Lindenwood Place / Seel Avenue	
2.5	1.6	Hennessey Drive / Buffalo Place	
3.0	1.9	McGillivray Boulevard (Route 155)	
3.75	2.33	Chevrier Boulevard	
4.2	2.6	Scurfield Boulevard	
4.8	3.0	Abinojii Mikanah (Route 165)	
5.5	3.4	Arbour Meadow Gate / Lake Crest Road	
6.1	3.8	Bison Drive – University of Manitoba	
7.65	4.75	John Angus Drive / Sandusky Drive	
8.2	5.1	Pine Hills Road / Tim Sale Drive	
8.8	5.5	John Angus Drive / Tim Sale Drive	
9.3	5.8	Kenaston Boulevard (Route 90)	Route 80 southern terminus
1.000 mi = 1.609 km; 1.000 km = 0.621 mi: Closed/former
