= Winnipeg Route 155 =

City route in Winnipeg, Canada

Route 155
- McGillivray Boulevard
- Route 155 highlighted in red

Route information
- Maintained by City of Winnipeg
- Length: 14.1 km (8.8 mi)
- Existed: 1966–present
- Component highways: PTH 3

Major junctions
- West end: PTH 100 (Perimeter Hwy) / PTH 3 west
- Route 90 (Kenaston Blvd); Route 80 (Waverley St)
- East end: Route 42 (Pembina Hwy)

Location
- Country: Canada
- Province: Manitoba

Highway system
- Provincial highways in Manitoba; Winnipeg City Routes
| ← Route 150 | → Route 165 |

Route 155 (known locally as McGillivray Boulevard) is a city route in Winnipeg, Manitoba. It runs from the Perimeter Highway (PTH 100) to Route 42 (Pembina Highway).

This major road begins at Oak Bluff and runs concurrently with PTH 3 to the Winnipeg city limits, where PTH 3 officially terminates. It goes through residential, commercial, and industrial areas before reaching its eastern terminus with Pembina Highway in the city's south end. The speed limit ranges from 60 km/h (37 mph) to 100 km/h (62 mph). It passed directly by the old village of Fort Whyte which is now considered part of the Whyte Ridge development in Winnipeg. It also provides access to the Trans Canada Trail at McGillivray Boulevard and Front Street. The Trans Canada Trail walks one through the Fort Whyte Centre.

== Major intersections ==
| Division | Location | km | mi | Destinations | Notes |
|---|---|---|---|---|---|
| R.M. Macdonald | Oak Bluff | −1.0 | −0.62 | PTH 3 west – Carman PTH 2 – Kenora, Treherne | PTH 3 continues west |
| R.M. Macdonald | Oak Bluff | 0.0 | 0.0 | Perimeter Highway (PTH 100 (TCH)) – Kenora, Brandon | Route 155 western terminus; west end of PTH 3 concurrency; interchange proposed |
| City of Winnipeg | | 8.4 | 5.2 | PTH 3 ends / Brady Road | Winnipeg city limits; PTH 3 eastern terminus |
| City of Winnipeg | | 9.5 | 5.9 | Lindenwood Drive W / Columbia Drive | |
| City of Winnipeg | | 9.9 | 6.2 | Kenaston Boulevard (Route 90) | |
| City of Winnipeg | | 10.4 | 6.5 | Lindenwood Drive E / Dovercourt Drive | |
| City of Winnipeg | | 11.7 | 7.3 | Waverley Street (Route 80) | |
| City of Winnipeg | | 14.1 | 8.8 | Pembina Highway (Route 42) Oakenwald Avenue | Route 155 eastern terminus; Oakenwald Avenue continues east |
1.000 mi = 1.609 km; 1.000 km = 0.621 mi: Closed/former; Concurrency terminus
