= Perimeter Highway =

Provincial highway in Manitoba, Canada

Perimeter Highway
- Perimeter Highway; Winnipeg Bypass
- Perimeter Highway highlighted in red.

Route information
- Auxiliary route of PTH 1
- Maintained by Manitoba Infrastructure
- Length: 89.5 km (55.6 mi)
- Existed: 1955–present
- Component highways: PTH 100 (TCH); PTH 101

South Perimeter Highway
- Length: 40.0 km (24.9 mi)
- Major intersections: PTH 59 / Route 20; PTH 75 / Route 42; PTH 2; PTH 3 / Route 155

North Perimeter Highway
- Length: 49.5 km (30.8 mi)
- Major intersections: PTH 190; PTH 6; PTH 7 / Route 90; PTH 8 / Route 180; PTH 9 / Route 52; PTH 59 / Route 20; PTH 15 / Route 115

Location
- Country: Canada
- Province: Manitoba
- Rural municipalities: East St. Paul, Macdonald, Rosser, Springfield, West St. Paul

Highway system
- Provincial highways in Manitoba; Winnipeg City Routes
← PTH 89	→ PTH 110

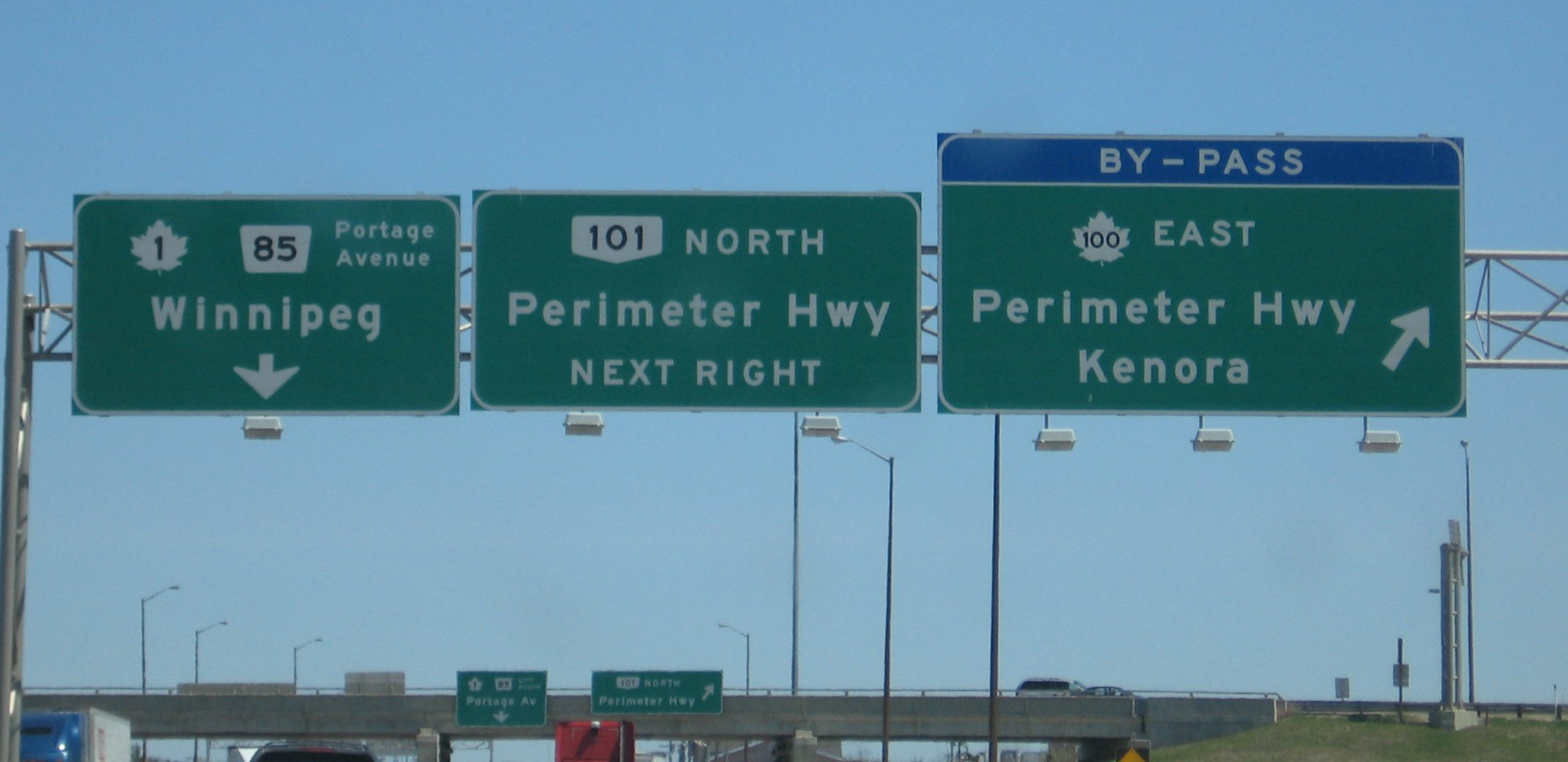
Portage Ave interchange

Provincial Trunk Highway 100 (PTH 100) and Provincial Trunk Highway 101 (PTH 101), collectively known as the Perimeter Highway, form a beltway around the Canadian city of Winnipeg, Manitoba. The Perimeter Highway is approximately 90 kilometres (56 mi) in length and serves as a ring road around Winnipeg for through traffic. It is often considered by local residents to be the city's unofficial boundary, although approximately three-quarters of the Perimeter Highway actually lies in the other municipalities within the Winnipeg Metropolitan Region.

== Route ==
The beltway consists of two provincial highways connected at separate junctions with PTH 1, the Trans-Canada Highway (TCH), on the east and west sides of the Winnipeg. The North Perimeter highway is officially designated PTH 101 and is part of Canada's National Highway System. The South Perimeter highway is designated PTH 100 and is the official TCH bypass around Winnipeg but not part of the National Highway System. The entire route is a four-lane divided expressway with a mixture of interchanges and at-grade intersections.

== History, ongoing work, and future upgrades ==
The highway was originally built in 1955 to bypass city centre rush hour traffic. This was done in lieu of a more expensive freeway system within the Capital Region. The South Perimeter Highway bridge across the Red River and roadway at Pembina Highway/PTH 75 south was constructed in 1958. The job was tendered to Peter Leitch Construction Ltd. at a cost of $188,670. In December 1957, Dominion Bridge was awarded the contract ($80,157) to supply the structural steel for the overpass. When constructed, the Perimeter Highway was located entirely in surrounding municipalities well outside of Winnipeg's official city limits, however roughly one-quarter of the highway is now inside proper city limits following the municipal amalgamation of Winnipeg in 1972.

The Perimeter Highway was originally unconnected between PTH 59 and PTH 15 as PTH 59 had received significant upgrades, making the need for a northeast section less pressing. PTH 59 continued to serve as the de facto northeast leg of the Perimeter until the mid-1990s, when PTH 59 and PTH 15 were connected. The last remaining two-lane section was the PTH 59 north interchange, which was upgraded over a three-year span ending in 2018. The highway now encircles Winnipeg as a four-lane roadway.

Improvements were made to the western segment of the highway in the early 2010s when PTH 190, Centreport Canada Way, was constructed. In addition to the interchange that connected to this new highway, a flyover was constructed over Saskatchewan Avenue (PR 425) and the adjacent railway crossing; and the median was closed at the entrance to Assiniboia Downs leaving only right-in/right-out access from the southbound side.

In 2018, the province announced its intention to upgrade the South Perimeter Highway to a limited-access freeway, the starting point of which was to close a number of uncontrolled median openings and accesses. This was followed by the release of a full South Perimeter Highway Design Study that proposed a set of upgrades to transform PTH 100 into a six-lane, free-flowing, limited-access freeway. The full vision for the freeway design would be realized through two multi-year phases, with some of the upgrades potentially tying in with a new by-pass around St. Norbert. Initial upgrades include the ongoing construction and improvement of various service roads, and the construction of multiple interchanges to replace the various traffic lights on the highway.

The first major upgrade from this plan, the replacement of the traffic signals at St. Mary's Road with an interchange, is expected to be complete by 2024. Following its completion, the traffic signals at PTH 3 (McGillivray Blvd) in Oak Bluff will be replaced with an interchange, a project that is currently in the planning and detailed design phase. Recently, the government announced the start of the planning phase for the next major construction project, which will collectively replace the traffic signals at St. Anne's Road with an interchange, and replace the adjacent at-grade CPR crossing with an overpass.

In 2021, the government announced a comparable proposal to upgrade the North Perimeter Highway, PTH 101, to full freeway standards. The first portion of this upgrade included the closure of multiple uncontrolled medians and accesses. A larger functional design study has since been commissioned to determine the final recommendations for the North Perimeter Highway, which is expected to be complete by 2025.

== Exits and crossings ==
Exit numbering begins at Fermor Avenue and increases clockwise.

Location	km	mi	Exit	Destinations	Notes
Perimeter Highway (PTH 101) continues north
Springfield	0.0	0.0	1	Fermor Avenue (PTH 1 (TCH)) to Route 135 west – Kenora	Cloverleaf interchange; signed as exits 1A (west) and 1B (east); PTH 100 (TCH) eastern terminus
Springfield	2.0	1.2		Murdock Road north	Westbound (clockwise) right-in/right-out
Springfield	3.6	2.2		Symington Road	At grade
↑ / ↓	5.2	3.2		Plessis Road	Right-in/right-out (both directions); no cross traffic
Winnipeg	6.8	4.2	8	PTH 59 / Lagimodiere Boulevard (Route 20 north) – St. Pierre-Jolys, Thief River Falls	Partial cloverleaf interchange; signed as exits 8A (north) and 8B (south)
Winnipeg	7.9	4.9		Melnick Road north	Westbound (clockwise) right-in/right-out
Winnipeg	8.0	5.0		Canadian Pacific Railway	Level crossing (overpass proposed)
Winnipeg	8.1	5.0		Aimes Road north Sumka Road south	Westbound (clockwise) right-in/right-out Eastbound (counter-clockwise) right-in/right-out
Winnipeg	8.4	5.2	Crosses the Seine River		
Winnipeg	8.8	5.5		St. Anne's Road (Route 150 north)	At-grade, traffic signals; interchange proposed; former PR 300 south
Winnipeg	12.4	7.7	14	PR 200 south / St. Mary's Road (Route 52 north) – St. Adolphe, Niverville	Dogbone interchange
Winnipeg	14.0	8.7	Crosses the Red River		
Winnipeg	15.9	9.9	18	PTH 75 south / Pembina Highway (Route 42) – Morris, Emerson, Grand Forks	Cloverleaf interchange; signed as exits 18A (north) and 18B (south)
Winnipeg	17.2	10.7		Waverley Street south	T-intersection; At-grade, traffic signals.
Winnipeg	17.9	11.1		Kenaston Boulevard (Route 90 north) to Waverley Street (Route 80 north)	T-intersection; At-grade, traffic signals
Macdonald	21.4	13.3		PR 330 south – Domain, La Salle	At-grade, traffic signals
Macdonald	21.9	13.6		Canadian Pacific Railway	Level crossing
Macdonald	22.0	13.7		Service road	Westbound (clockwise) right-in/right-out
Macdonald	23.1	14.4		Municipal Road 9E (La Salle Road)	Right-in/right-out (both directions); no cross traffic
Macdonald	23.9	14.9		Service road	Eastbound (counter-clockwise) right-in/right-out
Macdonald	24.7	15.3		Municipal Road 8E	Right-in/right-out (both directions); no cross traffic
Macdonald	25.6	15.9		Service road	Eastbound (counter-clockwise) right-in/right-out
Macdonald	26.8	16.7		PTH 2 west (Red Coat Trail) – Treherne, Souris	Eastbound (counter-clockwise) right-in only, to be closed with PTH 3 interchange
Macdonald	28.0	17.4		PTH 3 to PTH 2 / McGillivray Blvd (Route 155 east) – Oak Bluff, Carman, Morden	At-grade, traffic signals; interchange under construction
Macdonald	29.8	18.5		Oakland Road west Municipal Road 6E east	Southbound (counter-clockwise) right-in/right-out Northbound (clockwise) right-in/right-out
Macdonald	30.2	18.8		Central Manitoba Railway (CEMR)	Level crossing
Macdonald	30.7	19.1		La Verendrye Road west	Southbound (counter-clockwise) right-in/right-out
Winnipeg	35.3	21.9		PR 427 west / Wilkes Avenue (Route 145 east)	Partial cloverleaf interchange; signed as Exit (east) and Exit (west)
Winnipeg	38.8	24.1		Service road	Southbound (counter-clockwise) right-in/right-out
Winnipeg	38.1	23.7	40	PR 241 west / Roblin Boulevard (Route 105 east) – Headingley	Partial cloverleaf interchange; signed as exits 40A (east) and 40B (west) counterclockwise
Winnipeg	38.6	24.0	Crosses the Assiniboine River		
Winnipeg	39.3	24.4		Oak Forest Crescent Augier Avenue	Closed both directions; Oak Forest Crescent 2022; Augier Ave 2024
Winnipeg	40.0	24.9	42	PTH 1 (TCH) / Portage Avenue (Route 85 east) / YH – Airport, Brandon	Cloverleaf interchange; signed as exits 42A (east) and 42B (west); PTH 100 (TCH) western terminus / PTH 101 eastern terminus
Winnipeg	40.7	25.3		Service road – Assiniboia Downs	Southbound (counter-clockwise) right-in/right-out
Winnipeg	42.0	26.1		PR 425 (Saskatchewan Avenue)	Grade separated; access closed in 2012
Winnipeg	43.1	26.8	45	PTH 190 east (CentrePort Canada Way)	Partial cloverleaf interchange; signed as exits 45A (east) and 45B (west)
Rosser	45.6	28.3		Selkirk Avenue / Township Road 63N	Access closed in 2024
Rosser	48.5	30.1	50	PR 221 (Rosser Road) – Marquette, Rosser	Partial cloverleaf interchange; signed as exits 50A (east) and 50B (west)
Rosser	51.3	31.9		Canadian National Railway	Level crossing
Rosser	52.1	32.4		PTH 6 north / Paterson Drive south – Ashern, Grand Rapids, Thompson	At-grade, traffic signals
Rosser	54.6	33.9		Sturgeon Road	Westbound right-in/right-out
Rosser	57.9	36.0	60	PTH 7 to Brookside Boulevard (Route 90 south) – Airport, Stonewall, Arborg	Cloverleaf interchange; signed as exits 60A (South) and 60B (North)
Rosser	59.8	37.2		Canadian Pacific Railway	Level crossing
Rosser	61.2	38.0		Service road	Westbound (clockwise) right-in/right-out
West St. Paul	62.8	39.0		PR 409 north (Pipeline Road)	At-grade, traffic signals
West St. Paul	65.5	40.7		Holmes Road north	Westbound (clockwise) right-in/right-out
West St. Paul	66.8	41.5	69	PTH 8 north / McPhillips Street (Route 180 south) – Gimli	Cloverleaf interchange; signed as exits 69A (south) and 69B (north)
West St. Paul	68.7	42.7		Prest Avenue south	Eastbound (counter-clockwise) right-in/right-out
West St. Paul	69.0	42.9		Canadian Pacific Railway	Level crossing
West St. Paul	69.6	43.2	71	PTH 9 north / Main Street (Route 52 south) – Selkirk	Cloverleaf interchange; signed as exits 71A (south) and 71B (north)
↑ / ↓	70.3	43.7	Crosses the Red River		
East St. Paul	70.7	43.9	72	PR 204 north / Henderson Highway (Route 42 south) – Lockport	Partial cloverleaf interchange; signed as exits 72A (south) and 72B (north)
East St. Paul	72.1– 74.6	44.8– 46.4	76	PTH 59 / Lagimodiere Boulevard (Route 20 south) – Grand Beach	Combination Interchange; Signed as exits 76A (south) and 76B (north)
East St. Paul	76.2	47.3		Wenzel Street	At-grade, traffic signals
↑ / ↓	77.0	47.8		Central Manitoba Railway (CEMR)	Level crossing
Springfield	No major junctions				
↑ / ↓	80.2	49.8		Gunn Road west	At-grade, traffic signals
Winnipeg	83.5	51.9		Canadian National Railway	Level crossing
↑ / ↓	83.6	51.9		PTH 15 east / Dugald Road (Route 115 west) – Dugald, Anola	At-grade, traffic signals
Springfield	85.3	53.0		St. Boniface Road	Southbound (counter-clockwise) right-in/right-out
Springfield	87.2	54.2		Greater Winnipeg Water District Railway (GWWDRR)	Level crossing
Springfield	89.5 0.0	55.6 0.0	1	Fermor Avenue (PTH 1 (TCH)) to Route 135 west – Kenora	Cloverleaf interchange; signed as exits 1A (west) and 1B (east); PTH 101 eastern terminus
Perimeter Highway (PTH 100 (TCH)) continues south
1.000 mi = 1.609 km; 1.000 km = 0.621 mi: Closed/former; Incomplete access; Route transition; Unopened

== See also ==
- Winnipeg Metro Region

Trans-Canada Highway
Previous route Provincial Trunk Highway 1	Perimeter Highway	Next route Provincial Trunk Highway 1
