= Winnipeg Route 47 =

City route in Winnipeg, Manitoba, Canada

Route 47
- Logan Avenue
- Route 47 highlighted in red

Route information
- Maintained by City of Winnipeg
- Length: 5.9 km (3.7 mi)
- Existed: 1966–present

Major junctions
- West end: Route 90 (King Edward St)
- Route 180 (McPhillips St); Route 62 (Isabel St / Salter St); Route 52 (Main St)
- East end: Route 42 (Disraeli Fwy)

Location
- Country: Canada
- Province: Manitoba

Highway system
- Provincial highways in Manitoba; Winnipeg City Routes
← Route 42	→ Route 52

Route 47, locally known as Logan Avenue, is a city route in Winnipeg, Manitoba, Canada. It runs from Route 90 (King Edward Street) to Route 42 (the Disraeli Freeway). It is primarily a collector road through industrial and older residential areas of north-central Winnipeg.

Route 47 runs just south of and parallel to Canadian Pacific Railway's Winnipeg Yard.

Logan Avenue is named after Robert Logan, a prominent administrator who worked for the North West Company at the Red River Settlement.

== Route Description ==
Logan Avenue is an undivided four lane collector road, with a speed limit of 50 km/h (30 mph) for its entire length.

== Major Intersections ==
From west to east; all intersections are at-grade unless otherwise indicated. The entire route is in Winnipeg.

km	mi	Destinations	Notes
−1.70	−1.06	Brookside Boulevard	Logan Avenue western terminus
0.00	0.00	King Edward Street (Route 90)	Route 47 western terminus
0.60	0.37	Canadian National Railway Oak Point Subdivision / Dee Street	Rail crossing abandoned in 2020
0.93	0.58	Keewatin Street	
1.85	1.15	Quelch Street	
2.05	1.27	Canadian Pacific Railway La Riviere Subdivision	
2.15	1.34	Weston Street	
2.90	1.80	McPhillips Street (Route 180)	
3.35	2.08	Canadian Pacific Railway industrial spur	
3.50	2.17	Arlington Street	
4.35	2.70	Sherbrook Street	
4.80	2.98	Salter Street / Isabel Street (Route 62)	
5.10	3.17	Ellen Street	
5.45	3.39	Princess Street	One-way southbound
5.55	3.45	King Street	One-way northbound
5.70	3.54	Main Street (Route 52)	
5.90	3.67	Disraeli Freeway (Route 42)	Route 47 eastern terminus; no access to Route 42 south
1.000 mi = 1.609 km; 1.000 km = 0.621 mi: Closed/former; Incomplete access
