= Winnipeg Route 25 =

City route in Winnipeg, Canada

Route 25
- Inkster Boulevard
- Route 25 highlighted in red

Route information
- Maintained by City of Winnipeg
- Length: 5.8 km (3.6 mi)
- Existed: 1966–present

Major junctions
- West end: Route 90 (Brookside Blvd) / PTH 190 west (CentrePort Canada Way)
- East end: Route 180 (McPhillips St)

Location
- Country: Canada
- Province: Manitoba

Highway system
- Provincial highways in Manitoba; Winnipeg City Routes
← Route 23	→ Route 30

Route 25 is a city route in the Canadian city of Winnipeg, Manitoba. It follows Inkster Boulevard from Route 90 (Brookside Boulevard) to Route 180 (McPhillips Street). West of Route 90, Inkster Boulevard becomes PTH 190 (CentrePort Canada Way) as it leaves Winnipeg and enters the Rural Municipality of Rosser. East of McPhillips, Inkster continues to Route 52 (Main Street), but this is not part of Route 25.

The route is a major road running through residential and industrial areas. The speed limit between Keewatin Street and Route 180 is 60 km/h (35 mph) while the speed limit between Route 90 and Keewatin Street is 70 km/h (45 mph).

== Major intersections ==
The entire route is in Winnipeg.

km	mi	Destinations	Notes
0.0	0.0	PTH 190 west (CentrePort Canada Way) Brookside Boulevard (Route 90) – Airport	Route 25 western terminus; continues as PTH 190
3.2	2.0	Keewatin Street	
5.8	3.6	McPhillips Street (Route 180)	Route 25 eastern terminus
7.6	4.7	McGregor Street	
7.8	4.8	Salter Street (Route 62)	
8.7	5.4	Main Street (Route 52)	
9.6	6.0	Scotia Street	Inkster Blvd eastern terminus
1.000 mi = 1.609 km; 1.000 km = 0.621 mi: Closed/former
