= Winnipeg Route 90 =

City route in Winnipeg, Canada

Route 90
- Kenaston Boulevard; Century Street; King Edward Street; Oak Point Highway; Brookside Boulevard
- Route 90 highlighted in red

Route information
- Maintained by City of Winnipeg
- Length: 24.8 km (15.4 mi)
- Existed: 1966–present

Major junctions
- South end: PTH 100 (TCH) (Perimeter Hwy)
- Route 80 north (Waverley St); Route 165 east (Abinojii Mikanah); Route 155 (McGillivray Blvd); Route 145 (Sterling Lyon Pkwy); Route 105 (Grant Ave); Route 95 (Corydon Ave); PTH 1 (TCH) / Route 85 (Portage Ave); Route 57 east (Dublin Ave); Route 47 east (Logan Ave); PTH 190 / Route 25 (Inkster Blvd)
- North end: PTH 7 north / Mollard Rd

Location
- Country: Canada
- Province: Manitoba

Highway system
- Provincial highways in Manitoba; Winnipeg City Routes
← Route 85	→ Route 95

Route 90 is a major north-south arterial route in Winnipeg, Manitoba, Canada. It begins at the South Perimeter Highway (PTH 100) and ends at the city's northwest limit, where it continues north as PTH 7. Route 90 is designated as the city's airport route, as it passes by Winnipeg James Armstrong Richardson International Airport.

== Route description ==
Route 90 follows Kenaston Boulevard between the south Perimeter Highway and the Assiniboine River, through the suburbs of Waverley West, Fort Garry, and Tuxedo. North of the river, Route 90 enters St. James and follows Century Street to St. Matthews Avenue. Between St. Matthews and Dublin Avenues, it splits into separate one-way streets, with Century as the northbound and King Edward Street as the southbound. The route follows King Edward Street to the CP Carberry line underpass, after which Route 90 follows Oak Point Highway and later Brookside Boulevard before leaving the city and becoming PTH 7 approximately one kilometre south of the North Perimeter Highway (PTH 101).

== History ==
Kenaston Boulevard

Kenaston Boulevard is named after E. C. Kenaston, who was responsible for the development of Tuxedo, one of the main suburbs that the street passes through. Until the 1980s, it was a minor road that extended south to Scurfield Boulevard and was primarily used to access the inland cement plant and quarries located near present-day Fort Whyte. In order to accommodate increased traffic and development in the area, Kenaston Boulevard was extended to Abinojii Mikanah in the early 2000s and later all the way south to the Perimeter Highway in 2015. Proposals currently exist to appropriate land former belonging the Canadian Armed Forces' Kapyong Barracks to widen the road between the rail crossing and the St. James Bridge. A separate proposal would see the route extended south of the Perimeter Highway to Highway 75, providing a western bypass of St. Norbert.

Oak Point Highway

Oak Point Highway in Winnipeg is an unattached remnant of an old road leading to Oak Point, Manitoba, which is now part of PTH 6.

== Major intersections ==
From south to north; all intersections are at-grade unless otherwise indicated. The entire route is in Winnipeg.

Street Name	km	mi	Destinations	Notes
Kenaston Boulevard	0.0	0.0	Perimeter Highway (PTH 100 (TCH))	Route 90 / Kenaston Boulevard southern terminus
Kenaston Boulevard	1.2	0.75	Waverley Street (Route 80 north)	
Kenaston Boulevard	4.8	3.0	Bishop Grandin Blvd. (Route 165 west)	Grade separated
Kenaston Boulevard	5.7	3.5	Scurfield Boulevard	
Kenaston Boulevard	6.4	4.0	McGillivray Boulevard (Route 155)	To PTH 2 / PTH 3
Kenaston Boulevard	7.0	4.3	Lindenwoods Drive / Columbia Drive	
Kenaston Boulevard	8.8	5.5	Sterling Lyon Parkway (Route 145)	Passes Outlet Collection Winnipeg
Kenaston Boulevard	9.2	5.7	Wilkes Avenue	Northbound exit only
Kenaston Boulevard	9.8	6.1	Taylor Avenue	
Kenaston Boulevard	10.6	6.6	Grant Avenue (Route 105)	
Kenaston Boulevard	11.4	7.1	Corydon Avenue (Route 95) – Assiniboine Park, Zoo	
Kenaston Boulevard	12.5	7.8	Academy Road	Partially grade separated
Assiniboine River	12.8	8.0	St. James Bridge Kenaston Boulevard north end • Century Street south end	
Century Street	13.2	8.2	PTH 1 (TCH) / Portage Avenue (Route 85) / YH	Interchange
Century Street	13.6	8.5	Ness Avenue	Access to Polo Park
Century Street	14.1	8.8	Silver Avenue	Access to Polo Park
Century Street	14.4	8.9	St. Matthews Avenue	
Century Street (northbound); King Edward Street (southbound)	14.5	9.0	One-way transition	King Edward Street south end; south end of one-way pair
Century Street (northbound); King Edward Street (southbound)	14.9	9.3	Ellice Avenue	
Century Street (northbound); King Edward Street (southbound)	15.3	9.5	Sargent Avenue	
Century Street (northbound); King Edward Street (southbound)	15.7	9.8	Wellington Avenue – Winnipeg James Armstrong Richardson International Airport	
Century Street (northbound); King Edward Street (southbound)	16.6	10.3	One-way transition	Century Street north end; north end of one-way pair
King Edward Street	16.9	10.5	Dublin Avenue (Route 57 east)	
King Edward Street	17.4	10.8	Notre Dame Avenue – Red River College	
King Edward Street	18.4	11.4	Logan Avenue (Route 47 east)	
Oak Point Highway	18.7	11.6	King Edward Street north end • Oak Point Highway south end	
Oak Point Highway	19.2	11.9	Selkirk Avenue	
Brookside Boulevard	20.8	12.9	Oak Point Highway north end • Brookside Boulevard south end	
Brookside Boulevard	21.5	13.4	PTH 190 west (CentrePort Canada Way) / Route 25 east (Inkster Boulevard) – CentrePort Canada	
Brookside Boulevard	24.8	15.4	PTH 7 begins / Mollard Road	Winnipeg city limits; Route 90 northern terminus; PTH 7 southern terminus
R.M. Rosser	26.4	16.4	Perimeter Highway (PTH 101) PTH 7 north – Stonewall	Interchange; PTH 101 exit 60; PTH 7 continues north
1.000 mi = 1.609 km; 1.000 km = 0.621 mi: Closed/former; Incomplete access; Route transition
