= List of Winnipeg city routes =

This is a list of all city routes in Winnipeg, Manitoba, Canada. Even-numbered routes run north-south with numbers increasing from east to west and odd-numbered routes run east-west with numbers increasing from north to south.

== Expressways ==
These roads are high capacity limited-access roads serving the city. The speed limit is mainly 60 to 100 km/h (35 to 60 mph).

Number	Length (km)	Length (mi)	Southern or western terminus	Northern or eastern terminus	Local names	Formed	Removed	Notes
Route 17	5	3.1	Route 52 (Main St)	PTH 59 / Route 20 (Lagimodière Blvd)	Chief Peguis Trail	1990	current	
Route 20	16	9.9	PTH 100 (Perimeter Hwy)	PTH 101 (Perimeter Hwy)	Lagimodière Boulevard	1966	current	Concurrent with PTH 59 for entire length.
Route 90	25	16	PTH 100 (Perimeter Hwy)	City limits (continues as PTH 7)	• Kenaston Boulevard • Century Street • King Edward Street • Oak Point Highway • Brookside Boulevard	1966	current	Formerly part of PTH 7 north of Portage Ave; formerly part of PTH 6 north of Logan Ave (PTH 6 / PTH 7 concurrency between Logan Ave and present-day PTH 101).
Route 96	6	3.7	PTH 1 / Route 85 (Portage Ave)	Route 145 (Wilkes Ave)	• Moray Street • William R. Clement Parkway • Shaftesbury Boulevard	1995	current	
Route 135	12	7.5	Route 62 (Dunkirk Dr)	PTH 100 / PTH 101 (Perimeter Hwy)	Fermor Ave	1966	current	Concurrent with PTH 1 east of Route 150 (St. Anne's Rd).
Route 165	11	6.8	Route 90 (Kenaston Blvd)	PTH 59 / Route 20 (Lagimodière Blvd)	Abinojii Mikanah	1978	current	Common local name changed from Bishop Grandin Blvd in 2023

== Major routes ==
These routes are the high capacity major arterials around the city. The speed limit is mainly 50 to 80 km/h (30 to 50 mph).

Number	Length (km)	Length (mi)	Southern or western terminus	Northern or eastern terminus	Local names	Formed	Removed	Notes
Route 25	5	3.1	Route 90 (Brookside Blvd) / PTH 190 (CentrePort Canada Way)	Route 180 (McPhillips St)	Inkster Boulevard	1966	current	
Route 42	27	17	PTH 100 (Perimeter Hwy) / PTH 75	PTH 101 (Perimeter Hwy) / PR 204	• Pembina Highway • Donald Street / Smith Street* • Princess Street / King Street* • Disraeli Freeway • Henderson Highway	1966	current	Originally designated as Route 40, renumbered in 1967; formerly part of PTH 9 north of Main St; formerly part of PTH 75 south of Portage Ave.
Route 52	22	14	PTH 100 (Perimeter Hwy) / PR 200	PTH 101 (Perimeter Hwy) / PTH 9	• St. Mary's Road • Queen Elizabeth Way • Main Street	1966	current	Originally designated as Route 50, renumbered in 1967; formerly part of PTH 4 north of Portage Ave.
Route 62	6	3.7	Route 165 (Abinojii Mikanah)	Route 37 (Redwood Ave)	• Dakota Street • Dunkirk Drive • Osborne Street • Memorial Boulevard • Colony Street • Balmoral Street • Isabel Street • Salter Street	1966	current	Originally designated as Route 60, renumbered in 1967.
Route 70	12	7.5	Route 42 (Pembina Hwy)	Route 57 (Notre Dame Ave)	• Stafford Street • Academy Road • Sherbrook Street / Maryland Street*	1966	current	
Route 85	14	8.7	PTH 100 / PTH 101 (Perimeter Hwy)	Route 52 (Main St)	Portage Avenue	1966	current	Concurrent with PTH 1 west of Broadway; concurrent with the Yellowhead Highway for the entire length; formerly part of PTH 4 (PTH 1 / PTH 4 concurrency west of Broadway).
Route 105	13	8.1	PTH 100 (Perimeter Hwy) / PR 241	Route 42 (Pembina Hwy)	• Roblin Boulevard • Grant Avenue	1966	current	
Route 150	7	4.3	PTH 100 (Perimeter Hwy)	PTH 1 / Route 52 (St. Mary's Rd)	St. Anne's Road	1966	current	Concurrent with PTH 1 north of Route 135 (Fermor Ave).
Route 155	14	8.7	PTH 100 (Perimeter Hwy) / PTH 3	Route 42 (Pembina Hwy)	McGillivray Boulevard	1966	current	Formerly part of PTH 3.
Route 180	11	6.8	Route 57 (Notre Dame Ave)	PTH 101 (Perimeter Hwy) / PTH 8	McPhillips Street	1966	current	Formerly part of PTH 8.

== Minor routes ==
These routes connect the major routes, and expressways; they are mainly minor arterial or collector roads. The speed limit is mainly 50 to 70 km/h (30 to 45 mph).

Number	Length (km)	Length (mi)	Southern or western terminus	Northern or eastern terminus	Local names	Formed	Removed	Notes
Route 23	3	1.9	Route 180 (McPhillips St)	Route 52 (Main St)	• Leila Avenue • Partridge Avenue	1969	current	Originally designated as Route 5, renumbered in 1992.
Route 30	6	3.7	PTH 1 / Route 135 (Fermor Ave)	Route 37 (Nairn Ave)	• Archibald Street • Watt Street	1966	current	
Route 37	15	9.3	Route 62 (Salter St)	Route 115 (Dugald Rd)	• Redwood Avenue • Hespeler Avenue • Johnson Avenue W • Stadacona Street • Nairn Ave • Regent Avenue W • Pandora Avenue W • Ravenhurst Street	1966	current	Originally designated as Route 35, renumbered in 1967; formerly PTH 59B west of Lagimodière Boulevard.
Route 47	5	3.1	Route 90 (King Edward St)	Route 42 (Disraeli Fwy)	Logan Avenue	1966	current	Originally designated as Route 45, renumbered in 1967.
Route 57	8	5.0	Route 90 (King Edward St)	Route 30 (Archibald St)	• Dublin Avenue • Notre Dame Avenue • Cumberland Avenue • Portage Avenue • Pioneer Avenue / William Stephenson Way* • Provencher Boulevard	1966	current	Originally designated as Route 55, renumbered in 1967.
Route 80	9	5.6	Route 105 (Grant Ave)	Route 90 (Kenaston Blvd)	Waverley Street	1966	current	
Route 95	12	7.5	Route 42 / Route 62 (Confusion Corner)	Route 105 (Grant Ave)	• Corydon Avenue • Roblin Boulevard	1966	current	
Route 115	14	8.7	Route 52 (St. Mary's Rd)	PTH 101 (Perimeter Hwy) / PTH 15	• Marion Street / Goulet Street* • Dugald Road	1966	current	Formerly part of PTH 15 east of Lagimodière Boulevard; formerly PTH 59A west of Lagimodière Boulevard.
Route 125	2	1.2	Route 42 (Pembina Hwy)	Route 62 (Osborne St)	Jubilee Avenue	1966	current	
Route 145	11	6.8	PTH 100 (Perimeter Hwy) / PR 427	Route 80 (Waverley St)	• Wilkes Avenue • Sterling Lyon Parkway	1966	current	
