= Marquette, Manitoba =

Marquette
- Location of Marquette in Manitoba
- Coordinates: 50°3′52″N 97°43′58″W
- Country: Canada
- Province: Manitoba
- Region: Interlake Region
- Census Division: No. 14

Government
  - Governing Body: Rural Municipality of Woodlands Council
  - MP: James Bezan
  - MLA: Trevor King
- Time zone: UTC−6 (CST)
  - Summer (DST): UTC−5 (CDT)
- Postal Code: R0H 0V0
- Area codes: 204, 431
- NTS Map: 062I04
- GNBC Code: GAQFT
- Website: http://www.rmwoodlands.info

Marquette is an unincorporated community in the Rural Municipality of Woodlands in the Interlake Region of Manitoba, Canada. It is located approximately 46 kilometres (29 miles) northwest of Winnipeg.

== History ==
The post office opened in 1871 as Baie St. Paul, changed to Marquette in 1891. The community was first noted as Marquette Station in 1882, named for French-born Jesuit missionary Jacques Marquette.

== Climate ==
Marquette experiences a humid continental climate (Köppen Dfb) with warm to hot summers and cold winters.

Climate data for Marquette
Month	Jan	Feb	Mar	Apr	May	Jun	Jul	Aug	Sep	Oct	Nov	Dec	Year
Record high °C (°F)	8 (46)	9.4 (48.9)	17.2 (63.0)	36.1 (97.0)	37.8 (100.0)	38 (100)	35 (95)	38.5 (101.3)	37.5 (99.5)	31 (88)	23.9 (75.0)	10.6 (51.1)	38.5 (101.3)
Mean daily maximum °C (°F)	−12.6 (9.3)	−8.1 (17.4)	−0.9 (30.4)	10.1 (50.2)	19.3 (66.7)	23.3 (73.9)	25.6 (78.1)	24.9 (76.8)	18.5 (65.3)	10.8 (51.4)	−0.9 (30.4)	−9.8 (14.4)	8.4 (47.1)
Daily mean °C (°F)	−17.5 (0.5)	−13.2 (8.2)	−5.8 (21.6)	4.1 (39.4)	12.4 (54.3)	17.1 (62.8)	19.6 (67.3)	18.6 (65.5)	12.6 (54.7)	5.6 (42.1)	−4.9 (23.2)	−14.3 (6.3)	2.9 (37.2)
Mean daily minimum °C (°F)	−22.3 (−8.1)	−18.2 (−0.8)	−10.7 (12.7)	−1.9 (28.6)	5.5 (41.9)	10.9 (51.6)	13.5 (56.3)	12.1 (53.8)	6.7 (44.1)	0.4 (32.7)	−8.9 (16.0)	−18.8 (−1.8)	−2.6 (27.3)
Record low °C (°F)	−39.5 (−39.1)	−41 (−42)	−33.3 (−27.9)	−27.8 (−18.0)	−9 (16)	−0.5 (31.1)	2.8 (37.0)	1.1 (34.0)	−5 (23)	−19 (−2)	−35 (−31)	−39.5 (−39.1)	−41 (−42)
Average precipitation mm (inches)	23.3 (0.92)	18.3 (0.72)	26.6 (1.05)	32.7 (1.29)	57.8 (2.28)	87.3 (3.44)	73.1 (2.88)	70.5 (2.78)	57 (2.2)	39.1 (1.54)	29.6 (1.17)	23.5 (0.93)	538.8 (21.21)
Source: Environment Canada

== Notable people ==
- Aganetha Dyck (born 1937), artist
