= Winnipeg Route 23 =

City route in Winnipeg, Canada

Route 23
- Leila Ave / Partridge Ave
- Route 20 highlighted in red

Route information
- Maintained by City of Winnipeg
- Length: 2.8 km (1.7 mi)
- Existed: 1992–present
- History: Route 5 (1969-1992)

Major junctions
- West end: Route 180 (McPhillips St)
- East end: Route 52 (Main St)

Location
- Country: Canada
- Province: Manitoba

Highway system
- Provincial highways in Manitoba; Winnipeg City Routes
← Route 20	→ Route 25

Route 23 is a city route in Winnipeg, Manitoba, connecting Route 180 (McPhillips Street) and Route 52 (Main Street).

Route 23 is a minor arterial road connecting Main Street and the Garden City business district. The road is mainly known as Leila Avenue. There is a one-way section between the railroad crossing and Main Street where Leila Avenue is the westbound section of road, and the eastbound section becomes Partridge Avenue. The speed limit is 60 km/h (37 mph).

== History ==
Route 23 was originally designated as Route 5 when it was added to the Winnipeg Metro Route system in 1969. The route was changed to its current designation in 1992.

== Major intersections ==
The entire route is in Winnipeg.

km	mi	Destinations	Notes
−3.3	−2.1	Richie Street / Amberstone Road	Leila Avenue western terminus
−1.1	−0.68	Pipeline Road	
0.0	0.0	McPhillips Street (Route 180)	Route 23 western terminus
1.6	0.99	Partridge Avenue	One-way transition
1.6	0.99	One-way transition	Eastbound traffic follows Partridge Avenue; westbound traffic follows Leila Avenue
1.7	1.1	McGregor Street	
2.8	1.7	Main Street (Route 52)	Route 23 / Partridge Avenue western terminus; two-way traffic on Leila Avenue
3.4	2.1	Scotia Street	Leila Avenue eastern terminus
1.000 mi = 1.609 km; 1.000 km = 0.621 mi: Closed/former; Route transition
