= CentrePort Canada =

CentrePort Canada Inc.
- Headquarters: 100-200 Portage Avenue, Winnipeg, MB
- Key people: Carly Edmundson (President & CEO); Shreeraj Patel (Board Chair)
- Interactive map of CentrePort Canada

Location
- Location: Winnipeg and Rosser

Details
- Opened: 2008
- Land area: 20,000 acres (81 km^{2})
- Website: https://centreportcanada.ca/

CentrePort Canada is a tri-modal dry port and Foreign Trade Zone located partly in northwest Winnipeg, Manitoba (CentrePort South) and partly in the Rural Municipality of Rosser (CentrePort North), and situated adjacent to the Winnipeg James Armstrong Richardson International Airport (YWG). With 20,000 acres (81 km^{2}) of industrial land, it is one of the largest tri-modal inland ports and foreign trade zones in North America.

The port provides access to tri-modal transportation: rail—three Class I railways, specifically Canadian Pacific Kansas City (CPKC), Canadian National (CN), and BNSF Railway; air—a 24/7 international air cargo airport; and road—an international trucking hub.

CentrePort Canada also offers greenfield investment opportunities for a wide variety of business operations, including distribution, warehousing, and manufacturing. The portion of the inland port that falls within Rosser has access to a Special Planning Area to streamline the land development approval process.

According to its website, CentrePort Canada Inc. "...is responsible for the planning and development of the site; business development and investment attraction; and, marketing and promotions efforts."

CentrePort Canada Way is a 10 km (6.2 mi) expressway that links Winnipeg's Inkster Boulevard to the Perimeter Highway, and allows companies to achieve the five minutes to 90 km/h (55 mph) goal for moving cargo. It serves as a hub for national and international trading corridors, as well as attracting new transportation logistics development to the city area. Moreover, Winnipeg has connections to both of Canada's only major Pacific ports, Port of Vancouver and the Port of Prince Rupert, as well as a direct connection to the Port of Churchill, the only Canadian deep-water Arctic port.

== Governance ==
The CentrePort Canada Act
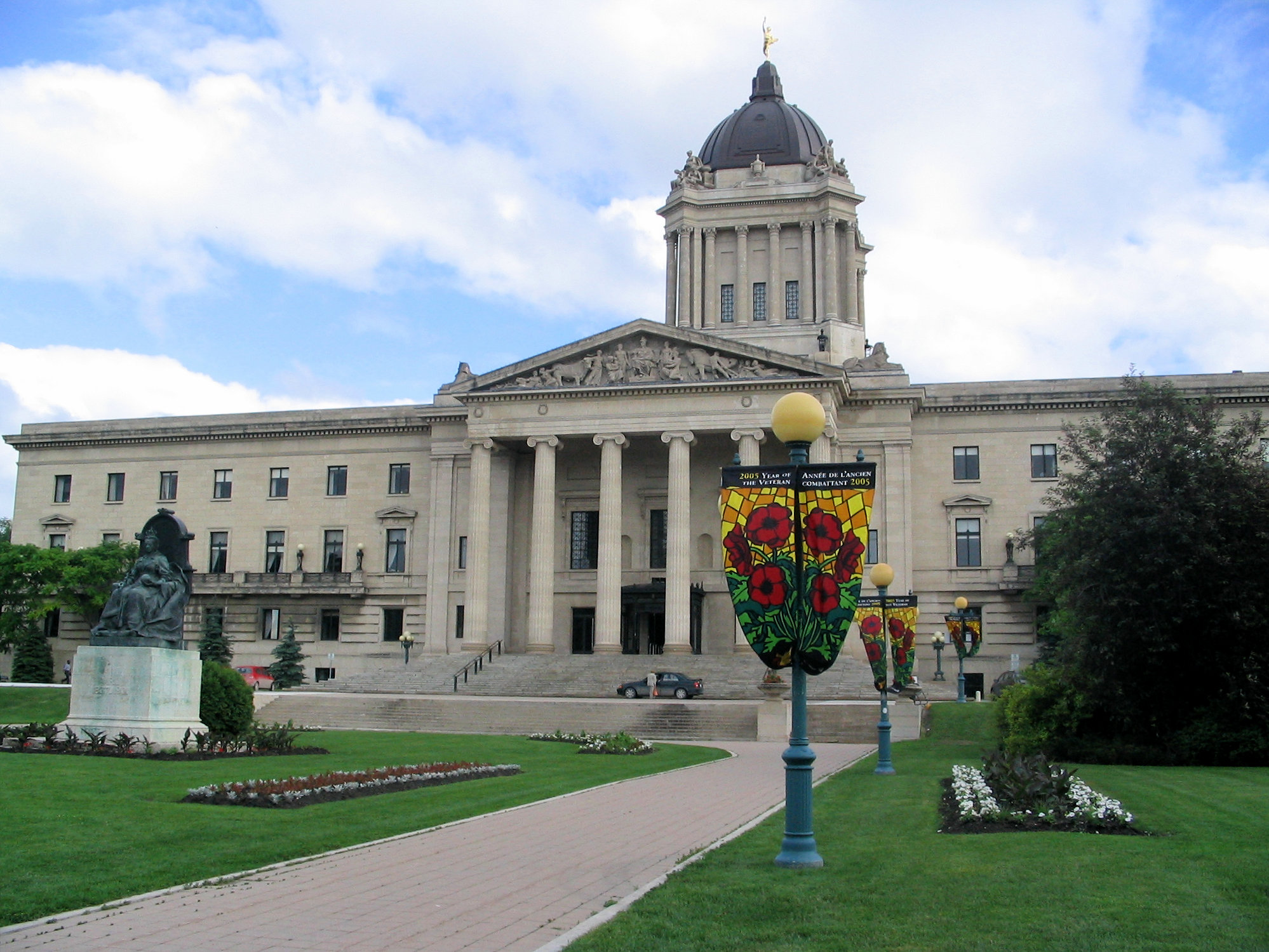

Legislative Assembly of Manitoba
- Citation: C.C.S.M. c. C44
- Enacted by: 2nd Session, 39th Legislature
- Assented to: October 9, 2008

Legislative history
- Bill title: Bill 47

Amended by
- SM 2010, c. 33, s. 75
- Status: Amended

In 2008, the CentrePort Canada Act was passed by the Government of Manitoba with unanimous support. This established CentrePort Canada Inc., and the boundary lines for the inland port.

The Act also defines the mandate for the corporation: facilitate long-term development and operation of the inland port, facilitate and encourage investment in the inland port, and promote the inland port by marketing it domestically and internationally.

Since 2008, CentrePort Canada Inc. has worked closely with related departments of the Manitoba government, including Manitoba Transportation and Infrastructure; Business, Mining, Trade and Job Creation; and Municipal and Northern Relations. Under The Planning Act, the portion of the inland port that falls within Rosser is a Special Planning Area, wherein land usage is guided by the Inland Port Special Planning Areas Regulation 49/2016 (Development Plan and Zoning By-law). The planning authority for lands within this area is the provincial Minister of Municipal and Northern Relations.

CentrePort Canada has also engaged with several federal departments, including Western Economic Diversification, Transport Canada, Global Affairs, and International Development.

CentrePort pursues investment attraction opportunities with economic partners like Winnipeg Economic Development & Tourism and World Trade Centre Winnipeg, among others.

=== Partners of CentrePort include (among others) ===
| Business & Financial Services | BDC, Johnston Group, Pinnacle, Relish Design, Tripwire Media Group, Xpromo |
| Education & Training | Red River College Polytechnic |
| Government & Crown Corporation | Rural Municipality of Rosser, Government of Manitoba, Efficiency Manitoba |
| Hospitality | Inn at the Forks, Best Western Plus |
| Legal | MLT Aikins, TDS Law |
| Membership | Manitoba Trucking Association, Manitoba Chambers of Commerce, Manitoba Real Estate Association, NASCO, Winnipeg Chamber of Commerce |
| Planning, Land Development & Construction Services | Scatliff + Miller + Murray, PCL, Concord Projects, KGS Group, The Munro Group |
| Real Estate | Cushman & Wakefield, Colliers |
| Trade & Economic Development | World Trade Centre Winnipeg, Winnipeg Metropolitan Region |
| Transportation & Logistics | Bison Transport, Prairie Rail Solutions |

== Operations ==
=== Tri-modal transportation ===
CentrePort Canada provides access to tri-modal transportation:

1. Rail: three Class I railways, specifically Canadian National (CNR), Canadian Pacific (CPR), and BNSF Railway.
2. Air: an international air cargo airport (James Armstrong Richardson International).
  - This airport offers over 4,000 cargo flights a year.
  - Carriers on site include Cargojet, SkyLink Express, UPS, FedEx, DHL, Chrono Aviation, Morningstar Air Express.
3. Road: an international trucking hub.
  - Includes two of Canada's largest companies—Bison Transport and TransX.

=== Development Approach ===
CentrePort Canada Inc. maintains a “live, work, play and learn” approach to development.

Live: A new 500-acre residential community in CentrePort South in the Winnipeg lands will support up to 12,000 employees.

Work: CentrePort Canada also offers greenfield investment opportunities for a wide variety of business operations, including distribution, warehousing, and manufacturing. Over 1,000 companies are growing and expanding in modern industrial spaces.

Play: Green space, trails and recreation opportunities in CentrePort promote active, healthy living for those who live in, work in and visit the area.

Learn: CentrePort Canada is home to two Red River College Polytechnic (RRC Polytech) campuses and the National Research Council of Canada's (NRC) advanced manufacturing research facility.

Planned as a complete community, the vision for the area is to: encourage sustainable and innovative building practices; protect ecological areas; implement sustainable transportation options; establish a residential area; and, form partnerships with educational institutions to support a local workforce.

=== Developments to Date ===
Two significant developments include Phase 1A water and wastewater servicing in CentrePort South, and the Inland Port Special Planning Area (IPSPA) in CentrePort North: wherein land use is regulated by the Development Plan and Zoning By-law, helping to expedite planning and the land-development approval process.

==== Industrial Parks ====
Developers have also created the following industrial parks:

1. Brookport Business Park - Whiteland Developers, 280 acres
2. Brookside Business Park - Olexa Developers, 150 acres
3. Brookside Industrial Park West - Crystal Properties, 244 acres
4. InksPort Business Park - Whiteland Developers, 43.5 acres
5. CentrePort Canada Rail Park - Focus Equities, 665 acres
6. Keystone Industrial Park - Exemplar Developments, 184 acres
7. North Crossing Business Park - Exemplar Developments, 41 acres
8. Steele Business Park - MMI Asset Management Ltd., 17 acres
9. West Creek Industrial Park - Hopewell Development, 24.5 acres

=== Location ===
CentrePort serves as a hub for national and international trading corridors, as well as attracting new transportation logistics development to the city area. Winnipeg has connections to both of Canada's only major Pacific ports, Port of Vancouver and the Port of Prince Rupert, in addition to a direct connection to Churchill, Manitoba, a major grain export facility and the only Canadian deep-water Arctic port.

CentrePort Canada is therefore located at the hub of key economic gateways.

==== CentrePort connections to key gateways ====
| Gateway to the | Corridor | International Access |
|---|---|---|
| North | Staging area for northern Canada | to Europe, the Middle East, North Africa, and the Mediterranean |
| East | Ports of Thunder Bay, Montreal, & Halifax Atlantic Gateway | to Europe, the Middle East, and Asia |
| West | Asia-Pacific Gateway Port Metro Vancouver & Port of Prince Rupert | to China and the Pacific Rim |
| South | Mid-Continent Trade & Transportation Corridor Ports of Houston & New Orleans Ports of Manzanillo & Lázaro Cárdenas | to the United States, Mexico, and Latin America |

=== Industry sectors and companies ===
CentrePort's 20,000 acres (81 km^{2}) is principal for any degree of development and is particularly beneficial for the following industry sectors: advanced & composites manufacturing, aerospace, agribusiness and food processing, life sciences (biomedical/biotechnology), energy and the environment and transportation, logistics, and distribution.

CentrePort has 2,300 acres in active development, with more than 250 new companies choosing to locate to the inland port since its inception. Representing each sector, these companies include, but are not limited to:

| Transportation & Distribution | Aerospace | Agribusiness | Life Sciences | Energy & Environment |
|---|---|---|---|---|
| 4Tracks; Air Canada Cargo; Bison Transport; Canada Post; CentrePort Canada Rail Park; Fastfrate Group; FedEx; Groupe Touchette; Purolator; TransX; UPS; Winnipeg Richardson International Airport | Boeing; GE Aerospace; Magellan Aerospace; StandardAero | Imperial Seed; Manitoba Harvest Hemp Foods; Nutrien; O Foods; Paterson GlobalFoods | Conviron; Medline; Stericycle | Ampjack Industries; Major Drilling |

== CentrePort Canada Way ==
CentrePort Canada Way is a four-lane, 10 km (6.2 mi) expressway that links Winnipeg's Inkster Boulevard to the Perimeter Highway, and allows for 5 minutes to 90 km/h (56 mph). As Winnipeg is located near the geographic centre of North America, it serves as a hub for national and international trading corridors, as well as attracting new transportation logistics development to the city area.

Plans to build CentrePort Canada Way was announced on 14 April 2009, when Prime Minister Stephen Harper with Manitoba Premier Gary Doer declared at James Richardson Airport that both the federal and provincial governments would contribute CA$212.5 million towards a divided four-lane expressway. The expressway opened in November 2013.

The expressway is also situated within about $1 billion in supporting highway infrastructure.

== CentrePort Canada Rail Park ==
Winnipeg is the only major Canadian city on the prairies served by three continental class I railways: Canadian Pacific Kansas City (CPKC), Canadian National (CN), and BNSF Railway.

In March of 2022, Focus Equities was named the developer of CentrePort Canada Rail Park, an industrial park on 665 acres (2.69 km^{2}) of CentrePort's 20,000 acres (81 km^{2}) of land, located west of the Winnipeg Airport. The Rail Park is intended to further enhance access to the three Class I rail carriers that are already provided by CentrePort, and will provide rail serviced industrial land for companies engaged in global supply chain activities. CentrePort Canada Rail Park is currently selling custom, fully serviced lots from five to 100+ acres of zoned 13 (Heavy Industrial).
