= Rural Municipality of West St. Paul =

Rural municipality in Manitoba

West St. Paul
- Rural Municipality
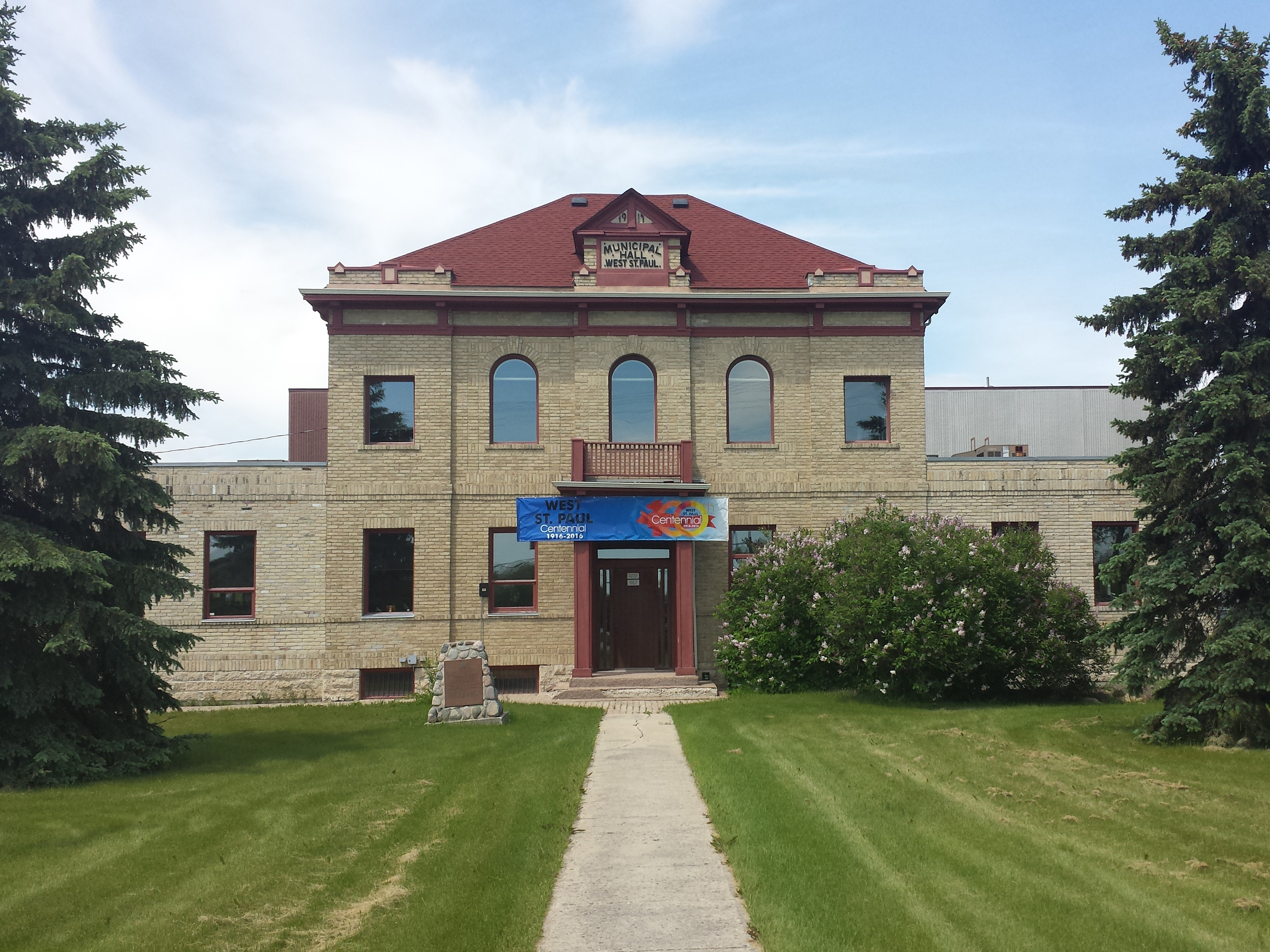
- RM of West St. Paul Municipal Hall

- Location of the RM of West St. Paul in Manitoba
- Coordinates: 50°00′43″N 97°06′54″W
- Country: Canada
- Province: Manitoba
- Region: Winnipeg Metro
- Founded: 1888
- Established: 1915

Government
  - Mayor: Peter Truijen
  - MLA: Jasdeep Devgan
  - MP: Raquel Dancho

Area
  - Total: 87.49 km^{2} (33.78 sq mi)
- Elevation: 229 m (751 ft)

Population (2021)
  - Total: 6,682
  - Density: 76.37/km^{2} (197.8/sq mi)
- Time zone: UTC−6 (CST)
  - Summer (DST): UTC−5 (CDT)
- Forward Sortation Area: R4A
- Area codes: Area codes 204 and 431
- Website: weststpaul.com

West St. Paul is a rural municipality (RM) in Manitoba, Canada. It lies adjacent to the north side of Winnipeg, and directly west of the Red River. It is part of the Winnipeg Metro Region, and had a population of 5,368 at the 2016 census.

It contains two communities, Middlechurch and Rivercrest. Middlechurch is the larger of the two communities and includes the municipal hall, cemetery, curling club, fire station, St. Paul's church, the Middlechurch Home of Winnipeg (established by the Christian Women's Union of Winnipeg), and Grassmere Creek all lie at the southern portion of the municipality.

The community of Rivercrest lies to the north and contains the West St. Paul School and Royal Manitoba Yacht Club.

== History ==
West St. Paul was formed on 3 November 1915 when the municipality of St. Paul (1888-1914) was subdivided into West St. Paul and East St. Paul.

== Demographics ==
In the 2021 Census of Population conducted by Statistics Canada, West St. Paul had a population of 6,682 living in 2,228 of its 2,270 total private dwellings, a change of 24.5% from its 2016 population of 5,368. With a land area of 87.49 km^{2} (33.78 sq mi), it had a population density of 76.4/km^{2} (197.8/sq mi) in 2021.

Panethnic groups in the Rural Municipality of West St. Paul (2001−2021)
Panethnic group	2021		2016		2011		2006		2001	
Panethnic group	Pop.	%	Pop.	%	Pop.	%	Pop.	%	Pop.	%
European (Note: Statistic includes all persons that did not make up part of a visible minority or an indigenous identity.)	4,825	74.4%	4,245	82.51%	4,045	86.34%	3,810	91.48%	3,625	93.19%
Indigenous	685	10.56%	470	9.14%	370	7.9%	160	3.84%	130	3.34%
South Asian	495	7.63%	215	4.18%	100	2.13%	95	2.28%	30	0.77%
Southeast Asian (Note: Statistic includes total responses of "Filipino" and "Southeast Asian" under visible minority section on census.)	250	3.86%	145	2.82%	85	1.81%	20	0.48%	50	1.29%
African	105	1.62%	35	0.68%	40	0.85%	30	0.72%	45	1.16%
Latin American	35	0.54%	0	0%	0	0%	0	0%	20	0.51%
East Asian (Note: Statistic includes total responses of "Chinese", "Korean", and "Japanese" under visible minority section on census.)	20	0.31%	20	0.39%	15	0.32%	50	1.2%	0	0%
Middle Eastern (Note: Statistic includes total responses of "West Asian" and "Arab" under visible minority section on census.)	20	0.31%	0	0%	25	0.53%	0	0%	0	0%
Other/multiracial (Note: Statistic includes total responses of "Visible minority, n.i.e." and "Multiple visible minorities" under visible minority section on census.)	60	0.93%	25	0.49%	0	0%	0	0%	0	0%
Total responses	6,485	97.05%	5,145	95.85%	4,685	94.99%	4,165	95.59%	3,890	95.23%
Total population	6,682	100%	5,368	100%	4,932	100%	4,357	100%	4,085	100%
Note: Totals greater than 100% due to multiple origin responses

== Municipal Hall ==
The two-story municipal hall was built in 1917 and expanded with a North and South addition in 1989. It is considered a municipally-designated historic landmark of Manitoba and currently the only official historic site within West St. Paul.

== Municipal services ==
=== Water ===
Water services are provided by the Cartier Regional Water Co-Op via the Headingley Water Treatment Plant. From there the CentrePort distribution line serves Rosser Reservoir, the Rural Municipality of Rosser and the CentrePort development. Further northeast is the West St. Paul Reservoir which serves the RM.

=== Fire Department ===
The West St. Paul Fire Department is not a full-time fire department, but rather a paid-on-call department, meaning firefighters are paid only for the emergency calls and training that they attend. The department's fire coverage area encompasses the entire municipality of West St. Paul or 87.66 km^{2} (33.85 mi^{2}). The department responds to a variety of emergency situations including but not limited to fire response, medical response, motor vehicle collisions, Carbon Monoxide alarms, downed power lines and water rescue response. The department responded to a total of 264 calls for service in 2013.

The West St. Paul Fire Department's current organizational structure consists of 1 Fire Chief, 1 Deputy Fire Chief, 3 Captains, 2 Lieutenants, 1 training officer, and 24 firefighters. The department has a total of 32 members.

The department currently has seven vehicles and one boat it uses to respond to calls for service including two pumper engines, two water tankers, one rescue/command truck, two squad and one zodiac boat for water rescue response.

== Curling Club ==
The West St. Paul curling club was built and has been in operation since 1963. It received some notoriety in 2015, when team Reid Carruthers, from the West St. Paul club, won the Men's Manitoba Curling Provincials and placed third in the Men's National Brier

== St. Paul's Anglican Church ==
Established in January 1825, St. Paul's Anglican Church was built in order to keep up with the growing population along the Red River. The structure of the church was rebuilt in 1844 and again in 1878 as result of damage due to flooding. The Historic Sites Advisory Board of Manitoba erected a plaque in 1975 owing to its historical importance, however it is not yet listed as a historic site in Manitoba. Prior to becoming a municipality, the region surrounding the church was known as the parish of St. Paul's or parish of the middle church (middle owing to its being situated between the older St. John's Cathedral ("upper church") and St. Andrews-on-the-Red ("lower church")). Thus the church and parish provided a name to both the municipality as well as the nearby community.

== West St. Paul School ==
West St. Paul has one school, a kindergarten to grade 8 school that was built in 1947, expanded in 1953 and expanded again in 1959. Prior to building the school, classes were held at a local church (K to 3) as well as the municipal hall (grades 4 and up). In 1959, it joined the newly formed Seven Oaks School Division. Its current capacity is 600 students.
