= Kildonan Place =

Regional shopping centre in Manitoba, Canada

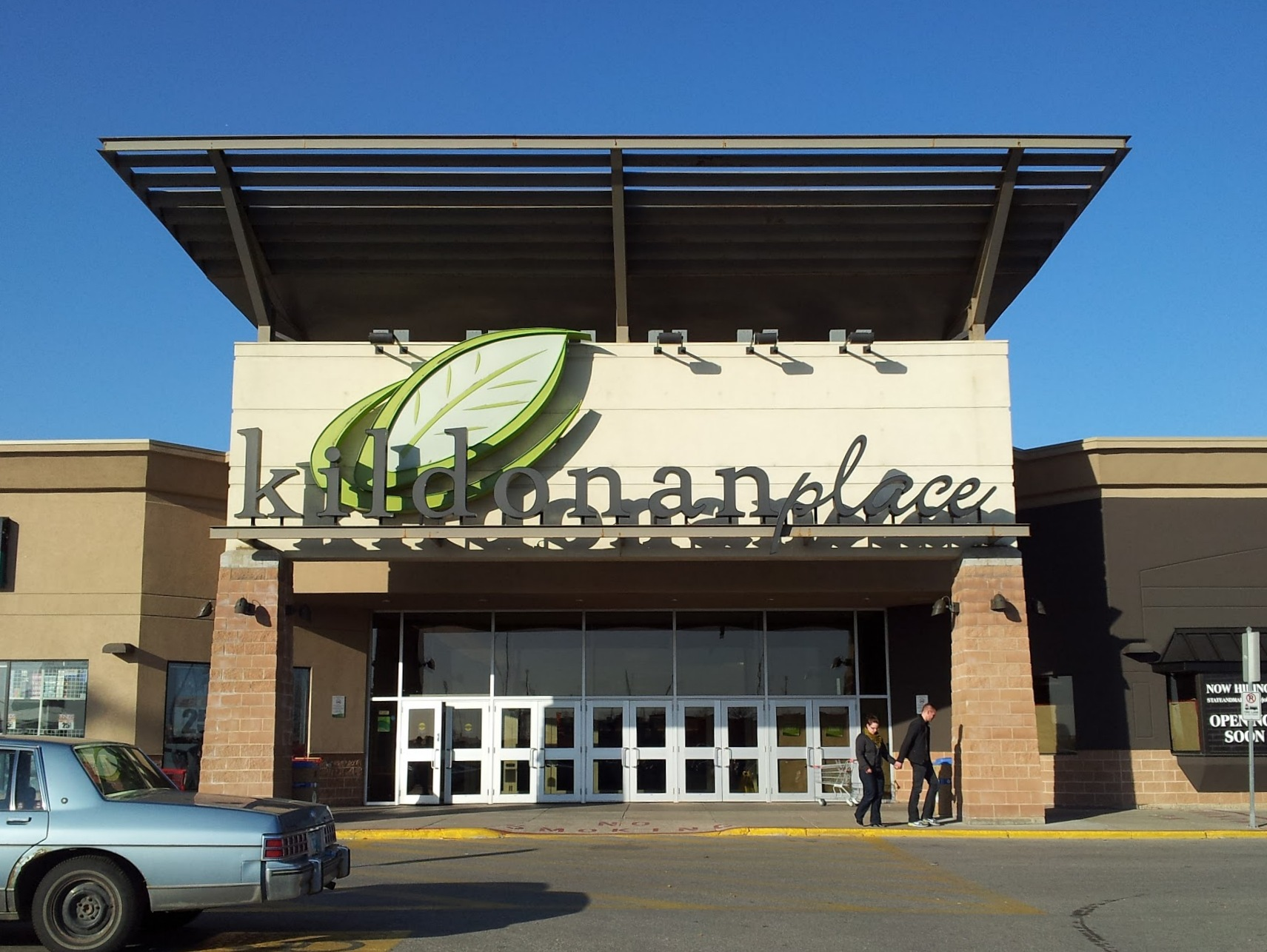
- Coordinates: 49.8982°N 97.0601°W
- Address: 1555 Regent Avenue West
- Opened: September 24, 1980; 46 years ago
- Manager: Primaris (owned by H&R REIT)
- Num. of stores: 119
- Public transit: Winnipeg Transit
- Website: www.kildonanplace.com

Kildonan Place is a shopping centre in Winnipeg, Manitoba, Canada, located in the neighbourhood of East Kildonan at 1555 Regent Avenue West.

The mall has 119 stores and services, a 6-screen theatre, and food court. It has 460,498 square feet (42,781.7 m^{2}) of gross leaseable area.

== History ==
Kildonan Place opened on September 24, 1980, with anchors Sears, Hudson's Bay, and Dominion Foods.

At the opening, the Hudson's Bay store was the largest single-floor Bay store in Canada.

An additional 100,000 sq ft (9,300 m^{2}) of large format stores and in-line stores is planned. In spring 2013, the location of the former Zellers store (closed in November 2012) opened as one of the first Target stores in the city.

In October 2016, crews started demolishing the inside of the former Target store and converting it into smaller sections. The new stores will be accessed from inside the mall, with HomeSense taking up 21,000 square feet and Marshalls at 24,000 square feet. Up to 11 new stores will be joining the mall starting with a mid-May opening followed by a second grand opening event later in summer of 2017.

The addition includes HomeSense, Marshalls, H&M, Urban Planet, Hakim Optical, Skechers, CAA & HUB Insurance. In addition, Mastermind Toys, Qdoba, Coal Fired by Carbone, and Almond Nail Bar were added as free standing units.

In June 2019, it was announced that a new 35,000 sq ft (3,300 m^{2}), six-screen Cineplex Cinemas location would be built in a portion of the former Sears space, replacing the existing Famous Players cinema. It was originally expected to open in late-2021. In November 2019, Cineplex announced that the location would be part of a new Cineplex banner known as Junxion, which will feature a family entertainment centre concept combined with a cinema.

In April 2021, Save-On-Foods opened a grocery store in another portion of the former Sears space. Cineplex Junxion opened in December 2022.

== Anchors ==
- Marshalls / HomeSense
- Cineplex Junxion
- Shoppers Drug Mart
- H&M
- Save-On-Foods
- Dollarama

== Former anchors ==
- Target, 123,256 sq ft (11,450.9 m^{2})
- Hudson's Bay, 120,000 sq ft - closed March 25, 2000
- Zellers, 123,256 sq ft
- Dominion Foods, 35,000 sq ft
- Sears, 119,479 sq ft (11,100.0 m^{2}) - Last remaining Sears in Winnipeg along with St Vital, closed January 8, 2018.

== Bus routes ==
The mall is served by a designated bus hub that accommodates several Winnipeg Transit routes, with surface lots available for park-and-ride use. The following stop/platform assignments are as follows:

Platform	Stop	Route		Destination
1	40784	442	North Kildonan	Springfield
1	40784	444	Redonda	Summerlea
1	40784	105	Meadows North On-Request	
2	40785	38	Mountain	Garden City Centre
2	40785	446	Donwood	Whellams
3	40786	48	McMeans	Redonda/Pandora
3	40786	440	Plessis	Lakeside Meadows
4	40787	D17	Selkirk	RRC Polytech
5	40788	D10	Adsum	Waterford Green
6	40789	F9	Abinojii Mikanah	University of Manitoba
On-street	40186	FX3	Grant	Sturgeon/Murray Park
On-street	40186	440	Rougeau	Crossroads Station
On-street	40186	105	Meadows North On-Request	
On-street	47020	FX3	Regent	Redonda/Pandora
