= List of Winnipeg Transit bus routes =

This is a list of bus routes in Winnipeg, Manitoba, Canada.

Winnipeg Transit provides public bus service to the city of Winnipeg, operating 71 bus routes, 12 On-Request services and 3,872 bus stops as of June 2025.

In June 2025, Winnipeg Transit overhauled its transit system with a refreshed "Primary Transit Network," which uses a spine-and-feeder model instead of the old hub-and-spoke model, and was intended to provide more reliable, efficient bus service across the city.

All routes are wheelchair accessible.

== Route types ==
Winnipeg Transit classifies its bus routes into the following eight categories:

Route Type	Route Description	Notes
Rapid Transit ("Blue" route)	Operates on a Transitway	Currently only the Southwest Transitway has been built. Plans for an Eastern Transitway have begun.
Frequent Express ("FX" prefix)	Frequent Express Lines have the highest service frequencies and longest distances between stops. Frequent Express Lines are located where rapid transit infrastructure will be built in the future.	Uses articulated buses and 40ft buses. Will be upgraded to Rapid Transit in the future.
Frequent ("F" prefix)	Frequent Lines have the next most frequent service, followed by Direct Lines. In the future, as Winnipeg continues to invest in transit, Lines may move up in service classes.	Uses articulated buses and 40ft buses. Buses run along major streets to help people travel across the city
Direct ("D" prefix)	Buses run along main streets to help people travel between neighbourhoods.	Uses 40ft buses. Possible route to Birds Hill Provincial Park, subject to agreement with the Province of Manitoba.
Connector Routes	Connect people to the Primary network and help them move around the city.	Uses 40ft buses.
Community Routes	Help people travel within their neighbourhoods, to nearby services, to connector routes and the Primary Network.	Uses 40ft buses.
Limited Span	Limited span routes operate only at certain times of the day. This may include express routes.	Uses 40ft and 30ft buses.
On-Request	Serves new and developing areas and other areas with low demand. Connects people to nearby destinations and other transit services.	Uses 40ft and 30ft buses.

== List of bus routes ==
=== Current routes ===
Below is the list of all Winnipeg Transit bus routes.

Route ID	Route name	Destinations	Notes
BLUE		Unicity Mall	Some buses terminate at the University of Winnipeg (Portage/Spence) during weekday rush hours.
BLUE		University of Manitoba or St. Norbert	Some buses terminate at the University of Winnipeg (Portage/Spence) during weekday rush hours.
FX2	Main	Garden City Centre	Some buses begin and terminate at Downtown (Portage/Main) during weekday rush hours.
FX2	St. Mary's	St. Vital Centre	Some buses begin and terminate at Downtown (Portage/Main) during weekday rush hours.
FX3	Regent	Redonda/Pandora	Some buses terminate at Downtown (Portage/Main and Main/James at Centennial Concert Hall), and at Kildonan Place during weekday rush hours.
FX3	Grant	Sturgeon/Murray Park	Some buses terminate at Downtown (Portage/Main and Main/James at Centennial Concert Hall), and at Kildonan Place during weekday rush hours.
FX4	Gateway	Raleigh/Knowles	Some buses terminate at Gateway/McLeod during weekday afternoon rush hours, and Downtown (Portage/Fort and Portage/Garry).
FX4	Portage	Polo Park	Some buses terminate at Gateway/McLeod during weekday afternoon rush hours, and Downtown (Portage/Fort and Portage/Garry).
F5	McPhillips	Garden City Centre	
F5	Donald	Fort Rouge Station	
F6	McGregor	Templeton/Salter (Southall)	
F6	Osborne	South St. Vital (John Forsyth/Glenham)	Travels via Dakota.
F7	St. Anne's	Creek Bend	
F7	Provencher	Broadway/Portage	Terminates at Gordon Bell High School.
F8	Henderson	Glenway	Some buses terminate at Downtown (King/William at City Hall).
F8	Pembina	University of Manitoba	Some buses terminate at Downtown (King/William at City Hall).
F9	Lagimodiere	Kildonan Place	Replaced the old Route 75 Crosstown East. Some buses terminate at Southdale Centre (Lakewood/Vermillion) during weekday rush hours.
F9	Abinojii Mikanah	University of Manitoba	Replaced the old Route 75 Crosstown East. Some buses terminate at Southdale Centre (Lakewood/Vermillion) during weekday rush hours.
D10	Panet	Kildonan Place	
D10	Adsum	Waterford Green (Old Commonwealth/Dr. Jose Rizal)	
D11	Salter	Templeton/Salter (Southall)	Proposed seasonal routing to Birds Hill Provincial Park subject to agreement with the Province of Manitoba. Some buses terminate at Downtown (Maryland/Portage at Gordon Bell High School and Sherbrook/Portage) during weekday rush hours.
D11	Stafford	Beaumont Station	Proposed seasonal routing to Birds Hill Provincial Park subject to agreement with the Province of Manitoba. Some buses terminate at Downtown (Maryland/Portage at Gordon Bell High School and Sherbrook/Portage) during weekday rush hours.
D12	Ellice	Airport	
D12	Ellice	The Forks	Terminates at the Canadian Museum for Human Rights, near The Forks Market terminal.
D13	Sargent	Airport	
D13	Sargent	The Forks	Terminates at the Canadian Museum for Human Rights, near The Forks Market terminal.
D14	Dugald	Redonda/Pandora	Travels via Ravenhurst before reaching Redonda Loop. Some buses terminate at Plessis/Regent during weekday rush hours.
D14	Broadway	Wall Street (Erin/Wolever)	
D15	Archibald	Sage Creek	Some buses terminate at Downtown (Broadway/Osborne at Legislature and Main/Broadway at Union Station) during weekday rush hours.
D15	Ness	Unicity Mall	Some buses terminate at Downtown (Broadway/Osborne at Legislature and Main/Broadway at Union Station) during weekday rush hours.
D16	Academy	Polo Park	Northern half of route became D18 in June 2026.
D16	Academy	City Hall	Northern half of route became D18 in June 2026.
D17	Talbot	Kildonan Place	Some buses terminate at Selkirk/McPhillips.
D17	Selkirk	RRC Polytech	Some buses terminate at Selkirk/McPhillips.
D18	Notre Dame	RRC Polytech	Split from northern half of route D16 in June 2026.
D18	William	City Hall	Split from northern half of route D16 in June 2026.
D19	Corydon	Assiniboine Park Zoo	Downtown terminal formerly at Webb & Vaughan until June 2026.
D19	Corydon	Downtown (Kennedy & Portage)	Downtown terminal formerly at Webb & Vaughan until June 2026.
22	Portage	Unicity Mall	
22	Portage	Polo Park	
28	Arlington	McPhillips Walmart via Garden City Centre	Some buses begin and end at Garden City Centre.
28	Stafford	Seel Station	Some buses begin and end at Garden City Centre.
31	Waterfront	The Forks	Follows the same routing as the old 32 North Main through Rivergrove and Riverbend.
31	North Main	Riverbend (Red River/Main)	Follows the same routing as the old 32 North Main through Rivergrove and Riverbend.
37	Jefferson	Cathedral/Main	After reaching terminal, buses continue as Route 39.
37	Jefferson	Waterford Green (Old Commonwealth/Dr. Jose Rizal)	After reaching terminal, buses continue as Route 39.
38	Mountain	Garden City Centre	
38	Munroe	Kildonan Place	
39	Inkster	Cathedral/Main	After reaching terminal, buses continue as Route 37.
39	Inkster	Waterford Green (Old Commonwealth/Dr. Jose Rizal)	After reaching terminal, buses continue as Route 37.
43	Watt	Gateway (Brunswick/Red Oak)	Some buses terminate at Downtown (King/William at City Hall).
43	Logan	RRC Polytech	Some buses terminate at Downtown (King/William at City Hall).
48	Transcona Blvd	Crossroads Station	
48	McMeans	Redonda/Pandora	
70	Roblin	Unicity Mall	
70	Roblin	Polo Park	
74	Kenaston	University of Manitoba	Some buses terminate at Polo Park (Portage/Tylehurst).
74	Keewatin	Waterford Green (Old Commonwealth/Dr. Jose Rizal)	Some buses terminate at Polo Park (Portage/Tylehurst).
91	St. Norbert	Baylor/Killarney	
91	St. Norbert	St. Norbert (Pembina/Station)	
101	South St. Vital On-Request	Victoria Crescent, Pulberry, Worthington, Minnetonka, St. Vital Centre, Vista, Meadowood, Normand Park, River Park South, Dakota Crossing, Royalwood	Serves St. Vital Centre, St. Vital Park, Bois-des-Esprits and major thoroughfares, Abinojii Mikanah (west), St. Mary's Rd, Dunkirk Dr, Dakota St and St. Anne's Rd.
102	Sage Creek–Windsor Park On-Request	Windsor Park, Niakwa Place, Southdale, The Mint, Southland Park, Island Lakes, Fraipont, Sage Creek	Serves Royal Canadian Mint, Southdale Centre, Sage Creek Village and major thoroughfares, Fermor Ave, Abinojii Mikanah (east) and Lagimodiere Blvd (south).
103	Northwest On-Request	Amber Trails, Leila North, West Kildonan Industrial, Templeton-Sinclair, Riverbend, Margaret Park, North Inkster Industrial, Inkster Gardens, Mandalay West, Tyndall Park, Inkster Industrial, Burrows-Keewatin, Shaughnessy Park	Serves Garden City Centre, Waterford Green Commons and major thoroughfares, Inkster Blvd (west), Oak Point Hwy, Keewatin St, McPhillips St (north) and Main St (north).
104	St. Boniface Industrial Park–South Transcona On-Request	Chalmers, Tyne-Tees, Mission Industrial, Holden, Regent, Mission Gardens, Dugald, St. Boniface Industrial, Transcona Yards, Transcona South	Serves Kildonan Place and major thoroughfares, Archibald St, Lagimodiere Blvd, Dugald Rd and Plessis Rd.
105	Meadows North On-Request	Valley Gardens, Eaglemere, Grassie, Peguis, Regent, Meadows	Serves Concordia Hospital, Kildonan Place, Crossroads Station and major thoroughfares, Gateway Rd, McLeod Ave, Concordia Ave, Molson St, Lagimodiere Blvd (north), Grassie Blvd and Plessis Rd.
106	Northeast On-Request	Valhalla, Kildonan Drive, River East, Rossmere-A, Springfield North	Serves McIvor Mall, River East Plaza and major thoroughfares, Henderson Hwy (north), Chief Peguis Trl, Raleigh St, Gateway Rd and Lagimodiere Blvd (north).
107	Riverview–Fort Garry On-Request	Lord Roberts, Riverview, Point Road, Wildwood, Crescent Park	Connects to Fort Rouge and Jubilee stations. Serves major thoroughfare, Pembina Hwy (north).
108	Westwood–Murray Park On-Request	Buchanan, Glendale, Crestview, Westwood, Sturgeon Creek, Heritage Park, Kirkfield, Murray Industrial, Booth, Jameswood, Silver Heights	Serves Grace Hospital, Unicity Mall, Crestview Centre, Westwood Village Centre, Living Prairie Museum and major thoroughfares, Portage Ave (west), Sturgeon Rd, Ness Ave and Moray St.
109	Charleswood On-Request	River West Park, Westdale, Ridgewood South, Southboine, Betsworth, Ridgedale, Roblin Park, Marlton, Eric Coy, Vialoux, Varsity View, Elmhurst	Serves Charleswood Centre, Park West Centre and major thoroughfares, Roblin Blvd, Grant Ave and William R. Clement Pkwy.
110	St. Boniface On-Request	North St. Boniface, Central St. Boniface, Norwood West, Norwood East, Glenwood	Serves St. Boniface Hospital, Dominion Centre and major thoroughfares, Provencher Blvd, Tache Ave, Des Meurons St, Marion St, Goulet St, St. Mary's Rd (north) and St. Anne's Rd.
111	Waverley West On-Request	Bridgwater Lakes, Bridgwater Trails, Prairie Pointe, Bridgwater Centre, Bridgwater Forest, Bison Run, South Pointe, Waverley Heights, Montcalm, Fairfield Park, Richmond West, Fort Richmond, Richmond Lakes, Parc La Salle, St. Norbert	Connects to Chancellor, Southpark, Markham and St. Norbert stations. Serves Victoria General Hospital, North Town Centre and major thoroughfares, Kenaston Blvd (south), Waverley St (south) and Pembina Hwy (south).
112	Whyte Ridge–West Fort Garry On-Request	Lindenwoods, Whyte Ridge, West Fort Garry Industrial, Linden Ridge, Buffalo, Chevrier, Maybank	Connects to Seel, Clarence, Chevrier and Plaza stations. Serves Kenaston Common, Linden Ridge Centre, Fort Whyte Alive and major thoroughfares, Sterling Lyon Pkwy, Kenaston Blvd (south), McGillivray Blvd, Abinojii Mikanah (west) and Waverley St (south).
220	Crestview	St. Charles	Also serves Unicity Mall and Grace Hospital. No weekend service.
220	Westwood	Rouge/Assiniboine	Also serves Unicity Mall and Grace Hospital. No weekend service.
223	Charleswood	Westdale (Dale/Windmill)	Also serves Unicity Mall. No weekend service.
223	Cavalier	Lumsden	Also serves Unicity Mall. No weekend service.
224	Sherwin	RRC Polytech	Also serves the Airport and the Health Sciences Centre. Sherwin portion of the route does not operate on Sundays & Holidays. Some buses begin and terminate at Polo Park (Portage/Tylehurst).
224	Valour	Tecumseh	Also serves the Airport and the Health Sciences Centre. Sherwin portion of the route does not operate on Sundays & Holidays. Some buses begin and terminate at Polo Park (Portage/Tylehurst).
330	Murray	Garden City Centre	After reaching Garden City, buses continue as Route 336 on Sundays & Holidays. Grey portion of the route does not operate on Sundays & Holidays; instead, buses terminate at McLeod/Louelda. Some buses begin and terminate at Walmart McPhillips instead of Garden City Centre.
330	Grey	Levis/Nairn	After reaching Garden City, buses continue as Route 336 on Sundays & Holidays. Grey portion of the route does not operate on Sundays & Holidays; instead, buses terminate at McLeod/Louelda. Some buses begin and terminate at Walmart McPhillips instead of Garden City Centre.
332	Amber Trails	Garden City Centre	No weekend service.
332	Church	Selkirk/McPhillips	No weekend service.
334	Watson	Garden City Centre	No weekend service.
334	Dr. Jose Rizal	Waterford Green (Dr. Jose Rizal/Adsum)	No weekend service.
336	Templeton	Garden City Centre	After reaching Garden City, buses continue as Route 330 on Sundays & Holidays. Tyndall Park portion of the route does not operate on Sundays & Holidays; instead, buses terminate at Waterford Green (Old Commonwealth/Dr. Jose Rizal). Some buses begin and terminate at Walmart McPhillips instead of Garden City Centre.
336	Tyndall Park	Fife	After reaching Garden City, buses continue as Route 330 on Sundays & Holidays. Tyndall Park portion of the route does not operate on Sundays & Holidays; instead, buses terminate at Waterford Green (Old Commonwealth/Dr. Jose Rizal). Some buses begin and terminate at Walmart McPhillips instead of Garden City Centre.
440	Rougeau	Crossroads Station	Replaced old Route 92. No weekend service.
440	Plessis	Lakeside Meadows (Devonshire/Dawnville)	Replaced old Route 92. No weekend service.
442	Concordia	Kildonan Place	No weekend service. The last bus terminates at Henderson/Northdale on weekday evenings.
442	North Kildonan	Springfield	No weekend service. The last bus terminates at Henderson/Northdale on weekday evenings.
444	Devonshire	Kildonan Place	No weekend service.
444	Redonda	Summerlea	No weekend service.
446	Peguis	Kildonan Place	No weekend service.
446	Donwood	Whellams	No weekend service.
551	Watt	Watt/Leighton	No weekend service.
551	Windsor Park	Paterson/Lagimodiere	No weekend service.
552	Aldgate	South St. Vital (John Forsyth/Ashworth)	Also serves St. Vital Centre. Before 15:00, the South St. Vital terminal is John Forsyth/Aldgate; after 15:00, the terminal is John Forsyth/Ashworth. No weekend service.
552	Meadowood	Avalon	Also serves St. Vital Centre. Before 15:00, the South St. Vital terminal is John Forsyth/Aldgate; after 15:00, the terminal is John Forsyth/Ashworth. No weekend service.
556	Beliveau	Sage Creek	No weekend service.
556	Beliveau	Plaza	No weekend service.
557	Island Lakes	Sage Creek	Connects to Fort Rouge Station. No weekend service.
557	Morley	Windermere	Connects to Fort Rouge Station. No weekend service.
558	Southglen	Avalon	Connects St. Vital Centre and The Mint. No weekend service.
558	Cottonwood	East Mint	Connects St. Vital Centre and The Mint. No weekend service.
641	Lindenwoods West	Beaumont Station	Connects Lindenwoods with the Southwest Transitway. No weekend service.
641	Lindenwoods West	Commerce (Tuxedo Business Park)	Connects Lindenwoods with the Southwest Transitway. No weekend service.
642	Lindenwoods East	Seel Station	No weekend service.
642	Lindenwoods East	Henlow/Fultz (Fort Garry Industrial)	No weekend service.
649	Chevrier	Seel Station	Travels through Linden Ridge and Whyte Ridge. No weekend service.
649	Chevrier	Fort Whyte Alive	Travels through Linden Ridge and Whyte Ridge. No weekend service.
650	McGillivray	Seel Station	Travels through Kenaston Common and Whyte Ridge. No weekend service.
650	McGillivray	Fort Whyte Alive	Travels through Kenaston Common and Whyte Ridge. No weekend service.
662	Richmond	University of Manitoba	No weekend service.
662	Richmond	Markham Station	No weekend service.
664	Taylor	Stafford/Pembina	No weekend service.
664	West Taylor	Outlet Collection Mall	No weekend service.
671	Dalhousie	University of Manitoba	Bridgwater terminal at Centre/Bison to provide a connection with Route 74.
671	Dalhousie	Prairie Pointe (Centre/Bison)	Bridgwater terminal at Centre/Bison to provide a connection with Route 74.
672	Killarney	University of Manitoba	
672	Killarney	Prairie Pointe (Castlebrook/Windflower)	
676	North Town	Bridgwater	Route extended past St. Vital Centre onto St. Mary's Road into South St. Vital and to Creek Bend.
676	Burland	Creek Bend	Route extended past St. Vital Centre onto St. Mary's Road into South St. Vital and to Creek Bend.
677	Wilkes	Beaumont Station	Route no longer serves the Tuxedo Business Park; rest of route remains the same as the old 677 Wilkes.
677	Wilkes	Outlet Collection Mall	Route no longer serves the Tuxedo Business Park; rest of route remains the same as the old 677 Wilkes.
678	Waverley West	South Pointe (Ken Oblik/Waverley)	Replaced old Route 693 Waverley Heights. No weekend service.
678	Chancellor	University of Manitoba (University/Freedman)	Replaced old Route 693 Waverley Heights. No weekend service.
679	Waverley	Seel Station	Replaced the southern part of old Route 78. Runs during weekday rush hour only.
679	Waverley	University of Manitoba (University/Freedman)	Replaced the southern part of old Route 78. Runs during weekday rush hour only.
680	River Heights	Polo Park	Replaced the northern part of old Route 78. No weekend service.
680	Cambridge	Seel Station	Replaced the northern part of old Route 78. No weekend service.
690	Industrial	Kenaston (Henlow/Scurfield)	After reaching the terminal, buses continue as Route 691. Travels through Fort Garry Industrial. Morning service terminates at Kenaston, while afternoon service terminates at Seel Station.
690	Industrial	Seel Station	After reaching the terminal, buses continue as Route 691. Travels through Fort Garry Industrial. Morning service terminates at Kenaston, while afternoon service terminates at Seel Station.
691	Whyte Ridge	Seel Station	After reaching the terminal, buses continue as Route 690. Travels via Chevrier and Scurfield. Morning service terminates at Seel Station, while afternoon service terminates at Whyte Ridge.
691	Whyte Ridge	Whyte Ridge (Scurfield/Kenaston)	After reaching the terminal, buses continue as Route 690. Travels via Chevrier and Scurfield. Morning service terminates at Seel Station, while afternoon service terminates at Whyte Ridge.
694	Wildwood	Seel Station	Operates during both morning and afternoon rush hours.
694	Wildwood	Fort Garry Industrial (Hamelin/Clarence)	Operates during both morning and afternoon rush hours.
833	Burrows	Tecumseh	Operates during both morning and afternoon rush hours.
833	Burrows	Tyndall Park (Burrows/Haddon)	Operates during both morning and afternoon rush hours.
881	Brookside	RRC Polytech	Operates during both morning and afternoon rush hours.
881	Brookside	North Inkster Industrial (Discovery)	Operates during both morning and afternoon rush hours.
883	Murray Park	Grace Hospital (Ronald/Portage)	Operates during both morning and afternoon rush hours.
883	Murray Park	Saskatchewan	Operates during both morning and afternoon rush hours.
884	Keewatin	Waterford Green (Old Commonwealth/Dr. Jose Rizal)	Operates during both morning and afternoon rush hours.
884	Keewatin	Portage/Wall	Operates during both morning and afternoon rush hours.
885	Rannock	Windmill/Dale	Also serves Grace Hospital. Some buses terminate at Cathcart/Grant instead of Unicity and at Ronald/Portage instead of Windmill/Dale. Operates during both morning and afternoon rush hours.
885	Westwood	Unicity Mall	Also serves Grace Hospital. Some buses terminate at Cathcart/Grant instead of Unicity and at Ronald/Portage instead of Windmill/Dale. Operates during both morning and afternoon rush hours.
886	Dugald	Stadacona (Levis/Nairn)	After reaching the terminal, buses continue as Route 887. Morning service terminates at Stadacona, while afternoon service terminates at South Transcona.
886	Dugald	South Transcona (Taggart/McFadden)	After reaching the terminal, buses continue as Route 887. Morning service terminates at Stadacona, while afternoon service terminates at South Transcona.
887	Dugald	St. Boniface Industrial (Taggart/McFadden)	After reaching terminal, buses continue as Route 886. Morning service terminates at St. Boniface Industrial, while afternoon service terminates at Stadacona.
887	Dugald	Stadacona (Levis/Nairn)	After reaching terminal, buses continue as Route 886. Morning service terminates at St. Boniface Industrial, while afternoon service terminates at Stadacona.
888	Tache	Norwood (Pinedale/Walmer)	Operates during both morning and afternoon rush hours.
888	Tache	Whittier Park (Messager/Tache)	Operates during both morning and afternoon rush hours.
889	Sherbrook Express	Tecumseh	Connects the University of Manitoba Fort Garry and Bannatyne campuses. Replaced the old Route 36 Health Sciences Centre Express. Operates during both morning and afternoon rush hours.
889	Pembina Express	University of Manitoba	Connects the University of Manitoba Fort Garry and Bannatyne campuses. Replaced the old Route 36 Health Sciences Centre Express. Operates during both morning and afternoon rush hours.
895	Morley	Jubilee Station	Does not directly enter Jubilee Station but serves the terminal along Rathgar. Operates during both morning and afternoon rush hours.
895	Morley	Riverview (Eccles/Clare)	Does not directly enter Jubilee Station but serves the terminal along Rathgar. Operates during both morning and afternoon rush hours.

=== Future routes ===
As of June 2026, there are no planned future routes for Winnipeg Transit.
