= Southwest Transitway =

Southwest Transitway may refer to:

- Southwest Transitway (Ottawa)
- Southwest Transitway (Winnipeg)
- Metro Green Line Extension (Minnesota), also known as the Southwest LRT
