= Garden City Shopping Centre (Winnipeg) =

Regional shopping centre in West Kildonan (Winnipeg), Manitoba

- Location: 2305 McPhillips Street; Winnipeg, Manitoba; R2V 3E1
- Coordinates: 49.9508°N 97.1449°W
- Opened: August 12, 1970; 56 years ago
- Developer: James Kelly
- Manager: RioCan REIT
- Owner: RioCan REIT
- Num. of stores: 70
- Num. of anchor tenants: 3
- Floor area: 379,681 sq ft (35,273.5 m^{2})
- Floors: 1
- Parking: 2,700 vehicles
- Public transit: Winnipeg Transit
- Website: www.shopgardencity.ca

Garden City Shopping Centre is a single-level shopping centre in Winnipeg, Manitoba, Canada, located at the intersection of McPhillips Street and Leila Avenue. Built in 1970, it was opened on August 12 that year.

With an area of 379,681 ft^{2} (35,273.5 m^{2}), the mall consists of 70 stores and 10 restaurants on a single level. Anchor stores include Canadian Tire, Winners and GoodLife Fitness.

The shopping centre is managed by McCor Management. The centre was sold by Primaris REIT in 2024 to a private ownership group.

== History ==
The shopping centre was developed by James Kelly of Toronto. The centre was built in West Kildonan upon 40 acres (16 ha) of land. Upon construction in 1969–1970, at a cost of millions of dollars, 100,000 ft^{2} (9,300 m^{2}) of space. The initial plan was for 40 stores. The T. Eaton Co. Limited also purchased space in the mall.

A major expansion began in 1974, with a 181,000 ft^{2} (16,800 m^{2}) addition. Anchor stores at that time included the Simpson-Sears store and a Dominion supermarket, with plans to add an Eaton's store and a Beaver Lumber. T. Eaton Co. Limited opened an 86,000 ft^{2} (8,000 m^{2}) store in August 1976. As of that same year, Garden City was one of the four largest regional malls in the city of Winnipeg.

The Eaton's store closed in 1998, and its space was taken over by a Canadian Tire store.

In Spring 2018, Garden City completed a $10-million renovation. The centre was enhanced with revitalized interiors, new seating, new bathrooms, revamped food court, and energy-efficient lighting throughout.

With Sears Canada having closed their operations due to nationwide bankruptcy, the space formerly occupied by them at the shopping centre has been redeveloped. The 92,000 ft^{2} (8,500 m^{2}) area was divided into multiple units, and a lease has been signed with Seafood City Supermarket, a new-to-Winnipeg iconic Filipino-focused grocer, Michaels, and Bulk Barn.

== Bus routes ==
The mall is served by a designated bus hub that accommodates several Winnipeg Transit routes, with surface lots available for park-and-ride use. The following stop/platform assignments are as follows:

Platform	Stop	Route		Destination
1	30364	28	Stafford	Seel Station
1	30364	330	Grey	Levis/Nairn
1	30364	336	Tyndall Park	Fife
2	30890	38	Munroe	Kildonan Place
3	30379	F5	Donald	Fort Rouge Station
4	30779	FX2	St. Mary's	St. Vital Centre
5	30780	332	Church	Selkirk/McPhillips
6	30377	334	Dr. Jose Rizal	Waterford Green
On-street	30376	D10	Panet	Kildonan Place
On-street	30363	D10	Adsum	Waterford Green
