= Garden City Shopping Centre =

Garden City Shopping Centre may refer to:

- Garden City Shopping Centre (Winnipeg), a shopping centre in Winnipeg, Manitoba
- Westfield Booragoon, a shopping centre in Booragoon, Western Australia formerly named as Garden City
- Westfield Mt Gravatt, a shopping centre in Upper Mount Gravatt, Queensland
- Westfield Kotara, a shopping centre in Kotara, New South Wales which rebranded in 2003
