= Unicity Shopping Centre =

Former regional shopping centre in Assiniboia (Winnipeg), Manitoba

- Address: 3655 Portage Ave, Winnipeg, MB R3K 2G6
- Opened: 1975 (as Unicity Mall)
- Developer: Trizec
- Owner: SmartCentres
- Num. of stores: 28
- Public transit: Unicity Transit Terminal
- Website: https://smartcentres.com/property/1356/

Unicity Shopping Centre (formerly Unicity Mall) is a shopping centre in Winnipeg, Manitoba. It is officially classified as a big-box centre. The location was originally the site of Unicity Mall, which was an enclosed shopping mall. It was named for the 1972 unicity restructuring of city management.

Originally known as Unicity Fashion Square when it opened in September 1975, the mall was anchored by a Woolco and The Bay, and was one of only three malls in the city, along with Polo Park and Grant Park Shopping Centre. Managed by Trizec Corporation, the mall initially prospered despite one wing being almost completely empty. The food court McDonald's was the first to be placed inside a mall in western Canada. The Mall was demolished in 2000 to make way for the current shopping centre.

== History ==
Unicity Mall was opened in September 1975 as Unicity Fashion Square, and was anchored by a Woolco and The Bay, and was one of only three malls in the city, along with Polo Park and Grant Park Shopping Centre.

In the mid 1980s, the local economy was slowing down and the mall began losing tenants. By the 1990s, it was mostly empty and the vacated spaces were used for temporary flea markets. During that time, Woolco became Walmart, and extensive pressure was placed on the mall ownership for expansion of the Unicity Walmart location.

In April 1995, owner Bramalea Limited, which had 67% stake in the mall, became bankrupt after all its board of directors resigned. At that time, the mall had 86 stores and an area of 485,000 square feet (45,100 m^{2}). Markborough Properties of Toronto, which had owned a smaller portion of the mall, immediately took over management and leasing.

Despite various legal battles between store owners, local residents, and the new ownership, the mall was demolished to make way for a larger Walmart. Ownership was transferred to First Pro and the mall was subsequently demolished in 2000 and replaced with a SmartCentres big-box complex.

The Unicity Shopping Centre is now home to Walmart, Canadian Tire, Sobeys, Staples Canada, Winners, Sport Chek, Tim Hortons, KFC, Burger King, Shoppers Drug Mart, Value Village, Mark's, Quiznos, Bulk Barn and Dollar Tree among others.

== Bus routes ==
The mall is served by a designated bus hub that accommodates several Winnipeg Transit routes. The following stop/platform assignments are as follows:

Platform	Stop	Route		Destination
1	20305	D15	Archibald	Sage Creek
2	20309	22	Portage	Polo Park
3	20304	70	Roblin	Polo Park
4	20245	BLUE		University of Manitoba
4	20245	BLUE		St. Norbert
5	20605	220	Crestview	St. Charles
5	20605	220	Westwood	Rouge/Assiniboine
5	20605	223	Charleswood	Westdale
5	20605	223	Cavalier	Lumsden
5	20605	885	Rannock	Windmill/Dale
5	20605	108	Westwood–Murray Park On-Request	
