= Whyte Ridge =

- Neighbourhood
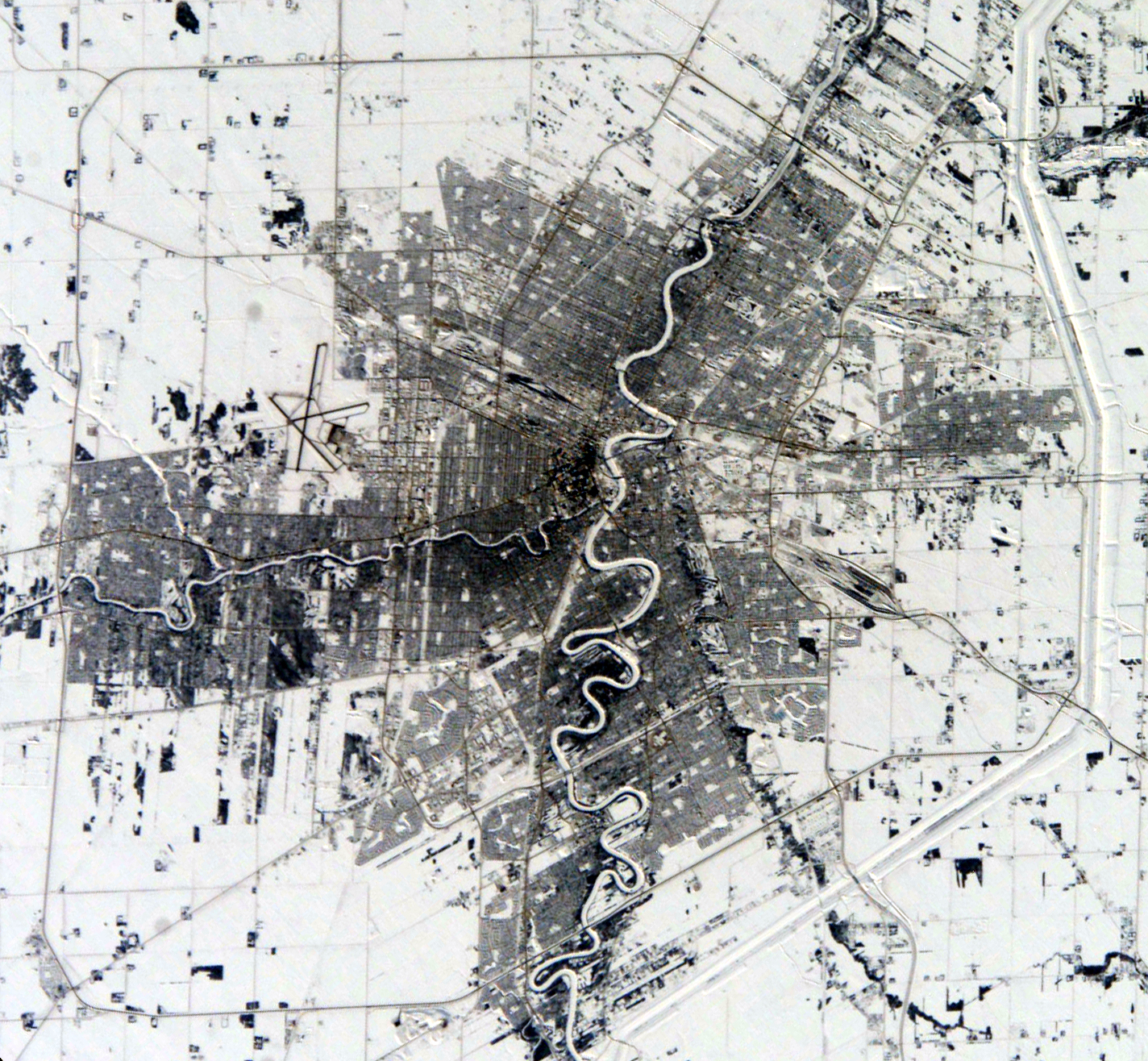
- Location within Winnipeg
- Coordinates: 49.813°N 97.207°W
- Country: Canada
- Province: Manitoba
- City: Winnipeg
- Named for: William Whyte

Government
  - Councillor: Janice Lukes (Waverley West)

Area
  - Neighbourhood: 2.8 km^{2} (1.1 sq mi)
  - Metro: 5,306.79 km^{2} (2,048.96 sq mi)
- Elevation: 232 m (761 ft)

Population (2016)
  - Neighbourhood: 7,690
  - Density: 2,700/km^{2} (7,100/sq mi)
  - Metro: 778,489
- Time zone: UTC-6 (Central Standard Time)
  - Summer (DST): UTC-5 (Central Daylight Time)
- Forward sortation area: R3Y
- Area codes: Area codes 204 and 431

Whyte Ridge is a residential area in the Waverley West ward in the southwest corner of Winnipeg, Manitoba, Canada.

The subdivision was built on former farmland, just south of a small townsite that was historically known as Fort Whyte. The first homes in the subdivision were constructed in 1986. The final homes in the subdivision were constructed in 2007, making a total of approximately 1,500 homes.

== History ==
The name of Whyte Ridge was derived from William Whyte, who led a "bloodless battle" over railway rights in 1888 on land that is adjacent to the current-day neighbourhood.

Subsequent to the battle of Fort Whyte, a small townsite called Fort Whyte appeared, which included a few dozen homes and a grain elevator. (The grain elevator burned to the ground in March 2000, but the original homes of the townsite are still found in Whyte Ridge along McGillivray Boulevard, just to the north of the newer subdivision.)

Effective October 2018, Whyte Ridge became part of the Waverley West city ward.

== Demographics ==
According to the 2016 Census, there are 7,690 people living in Whyte Ridge. Whyte Ridge is one of Winnipeg's wealthier neighbourhoods, the average household income is $86,534, which is about 1.7 times greater than the average income across the whole city.

Racial groups in Whyte Ridge, Winnipeg
Population group		Population (2006)	% of total population (2006)
White		5,925	78.3%
Visible minority group	South Asian	445	5.9%
Visible minority group	East Asian	565	7.5%
Visible minority group	Black	90	1.2%
Visible minority group	Latin American	20	0.3%
Visible minority group	Arab & West Asian	50	0.7%
Visible minority group	Southeast Asian	255	3.4%
Visible minority group	Other	10	0.1%
Visible minority group	Multiracial	50	0.7%
Total visible minority population		1,485	19.6%
Aboriginal group	First Nations	75	1%
Aboriginal group	Métis	70	0.9%
Aboriginal group	Inuit	10	0.1%
Aboriginal group	Aboriginal, n.i.e.	0	0%
Aboriginal group	Multiple Aboriginal identities	0	0%
Total Aboriginal population		155	2%
Total population		7,565	100%

== Community and amenities ==
Two large man-made lakes—simply named East Lake and West Lake—were excavated for the development and a ridge was created from the earth that was removed. While no fish have been stocked in either lake, because they drain out to the Red River through underground pipes, fish have made their way into the lakes. Brown bullhead, carp and northern pike are some of the species of fish that have been identified in the lakes. The lakes are also a popular place for Canada geese, pelicans, mallard ducks, coots, and other assorted fowl, many of which come to Whyte Ridge from the nearby FortWhyte Alive Wildlife Centre.

The neighbourhood contains an elementary school (kindergarten to grade 4) called Whyte Ridge School, and a middle school (grades 5–9) called Henry G. Izatt ("HGI") School. Both schools are found on Scurfield Boulevard, and have full-sized soccer fields and basketball hoops which are used by the community. In addition, HGI sports a softball diamond on its grounds.

Whyte Ridge Community Center, located on Fleetwood Road, currently contains a clubhouse, toboggan slide, full sized soccer field, tyke sized soccer field, outdoor basketball court and outdoor hockey rink, along with two parking lots. Further development of the community centre site is in the planning stages.

The neighbourhood has five playgrounds: one is found adjacent to the community centre on Cloverwood Road, one is found near HGI School adjacent to the softball diamond, two are found at Whyte Ridge Elementary School, and one is found to the south of the East Lake, on Columbia Drive.

The neighbourhood currently has one church, namely the Whyte Ridge Baptist Church on Scurfield Boulevard at Apple Hill Road. The church congregation has bought land north of Whyte Ridge on McGillivray Boulevard, where a larger church was planned. In addition, St. Gianna Beretta Molla Roman Catholic Parish was completed on vacant land that borders McGillivray Boulevard, Columbia Drive and Scurfield Boulevard. Lastly, a Presbityrian church was planned next door to St. Gianna's, also on McGillivray. There is no estimated time of construction for any of these churches.

Whyte Ridge residents of note include World Champion curler Cathy Overton-Clapham.

== Crime ==
All rates per 100,000

Whyte Ridge is one of Winnipeg's safest neighbourhoods. Crime rates are very low.

Whyte Ridge, Winnipeg - Crime Rates
Year	Homicide	Sexual Assault	Shooting	Robbery - Commercial	Robbery - Non-Commercial	Break and Enter - Commercial	Break and Enter - Residential	Break and Enter - Other	Motor Theft - Attempt	Motor Theft - Actual
2012	0	0	0	0	26.4	0	52.9	119.0	0	52.9

== See also ==
- FortWhyte Alive
