= Living Prairie Museum =

Tall grass prairie preserve in Assiniboia (Winnipeg), Manitoba

- Le Musée-Nature de la Prairie
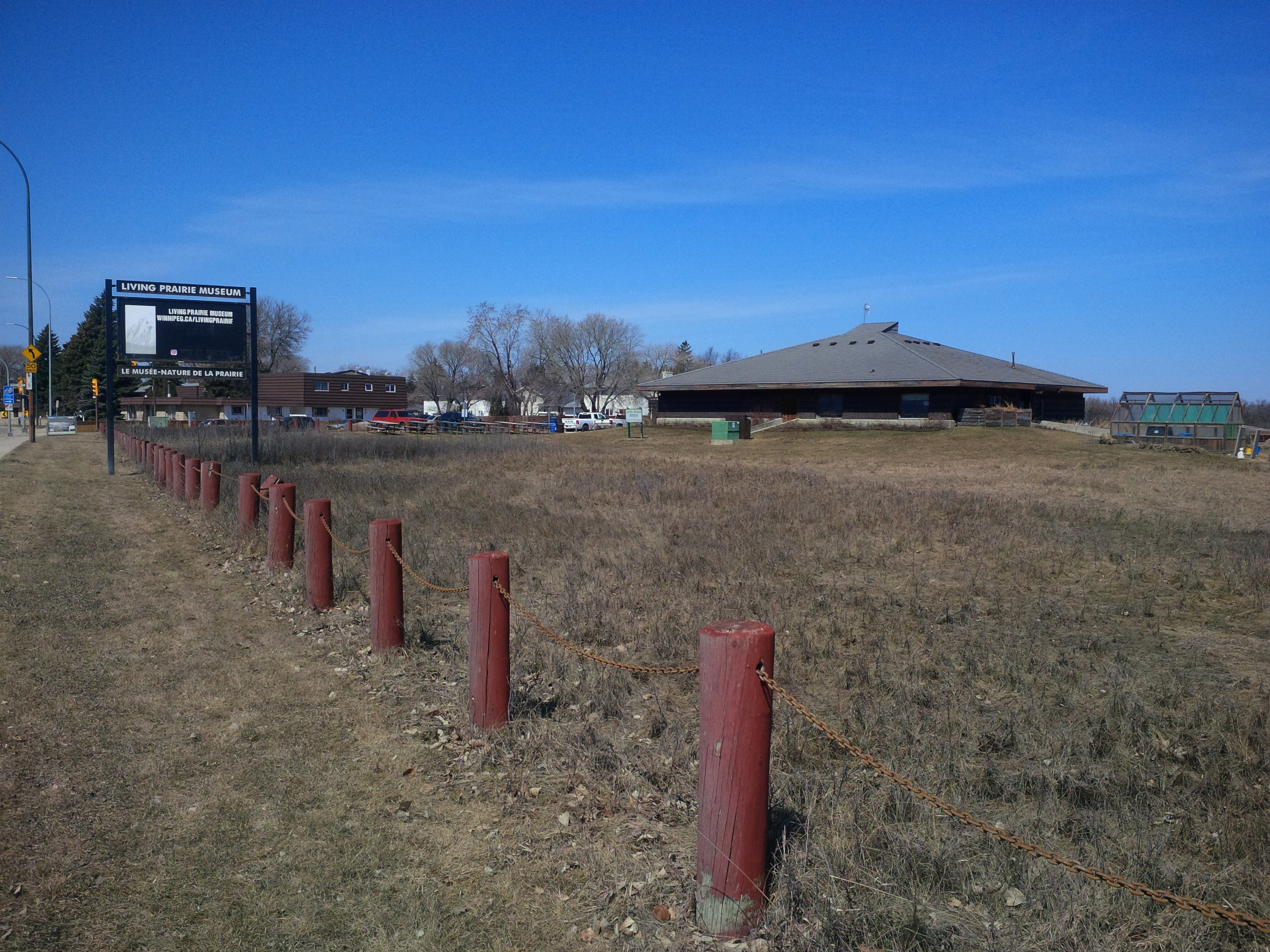
- Interactive map of Living Prairie Museum
- Type: Tall grass prairie reserve
- Location: 2795 Ness Avenue; Assiniboia, Winnipeg, Manitoba, R3J 3S4; Canada
- Coordinates: 49°53′24″N 97°16′18.12″W
- Area: 30 acres (12 hectares)
- Elevation: 777.6 feet (237.0 m)
- Created: 1968; 58 years ago
- Open: May–June (Sat. 10–4); July–Aug. (Tues. - Sun. 10–4); Sep.-Apr. (Sat. 11–4)
- Species: 160
- Public transit: Winnipeg Transit; D15 220 108
- Website: www.winnipeg.ca/recreation-leisure/parks/trails-natural-areas/living-prairie-museum

The Living Prairie Museum is a 30-acre (12 ha) tall grass prairie preserve located between Prairie View Road and Harcourt Street, north of Ness Avenue in the St. James-Assiniboia area of Winnipeg, Manitoba.

It was discovered in 1968 when two botanists from a local sub-committee of the International Biological Program surveyed Manitoba for native prairie plant communities. Of more than 60 sites that were researched, only four were found uncultivated. One of the largest undisturbed sites was discovered in a residential area of Winnipeg. Today a vestige of this original prairie community has been set aside as a City of Winnipeg Nature Park, called the Living Prairie Museum.

The Living Prairie Museum is home to over 160 species of prairie grasses and wildflowers, as well as a great array of prairie wildlife. In Manitoba only 1/20 of 1% of original tall grass prairie remains. The Living Prairie Museum is one of the few preserves of this once vast ecosystem. This museum is defined by the historical interpretation of the tall grass prairie of the Winnipeg Region.

The museum has an interpretative centre with displays on prairie history and ecology. Educational programs and events are held year-round.

== History ==
The City of St. James-Assiniboia set aside set aside 26.5 acres (10.7 ha) of virgin land untouched by urban development in Assiniboia, Manitoba, a suburb of Winnipeg to create the Living Prairie Museum in 1970. Preserving the land, it was projected to cost $90,000 over the 1970-1980/82 time period to maintain the space. The Report to St. James-Assiniboia Council at the time said:

The importance of the St. James prairie as a sample of original vegetation can hardly be over-emphasized. More than 125 plant species have already been found on the site, and it is probable that others occur.

Many of these are endangered species in Manitoba, for each year many natural areas disappear through agriculture and urbanization.

Because of its location within the city this area offers an unusual for young and old to enjoy a natural remnant of our heritage.

In 1973 an interpretive centre was approved by Winnipeg Council, who agreed to pay $50,000 (25% of the cost) of the 1.5 acres (0.61 ha) and would be counted as a Centennial project. A sod turning ceremony, attended by new Governor General Jules Leger took place in late April 1974. The Interpretive Centre was opened on June 23, 1976.

A year later, a group of residents lobbied to have an additional 50–100 acres (20–40 ha), at the time zoned as Industrial, be added to the Living Prairie Museum.

In the 1960s Metro planned the Western Freeway to cut through the Living Prairie Museum. Residents suggested it be built further north, before the project was cancelled.

== Affiliations ==
The museum is affiliated with CMA, CHIN, and Virtual Museum of Canada.
