= Winnipeg Rapid Transit =

Bus rapid transit system in Canada

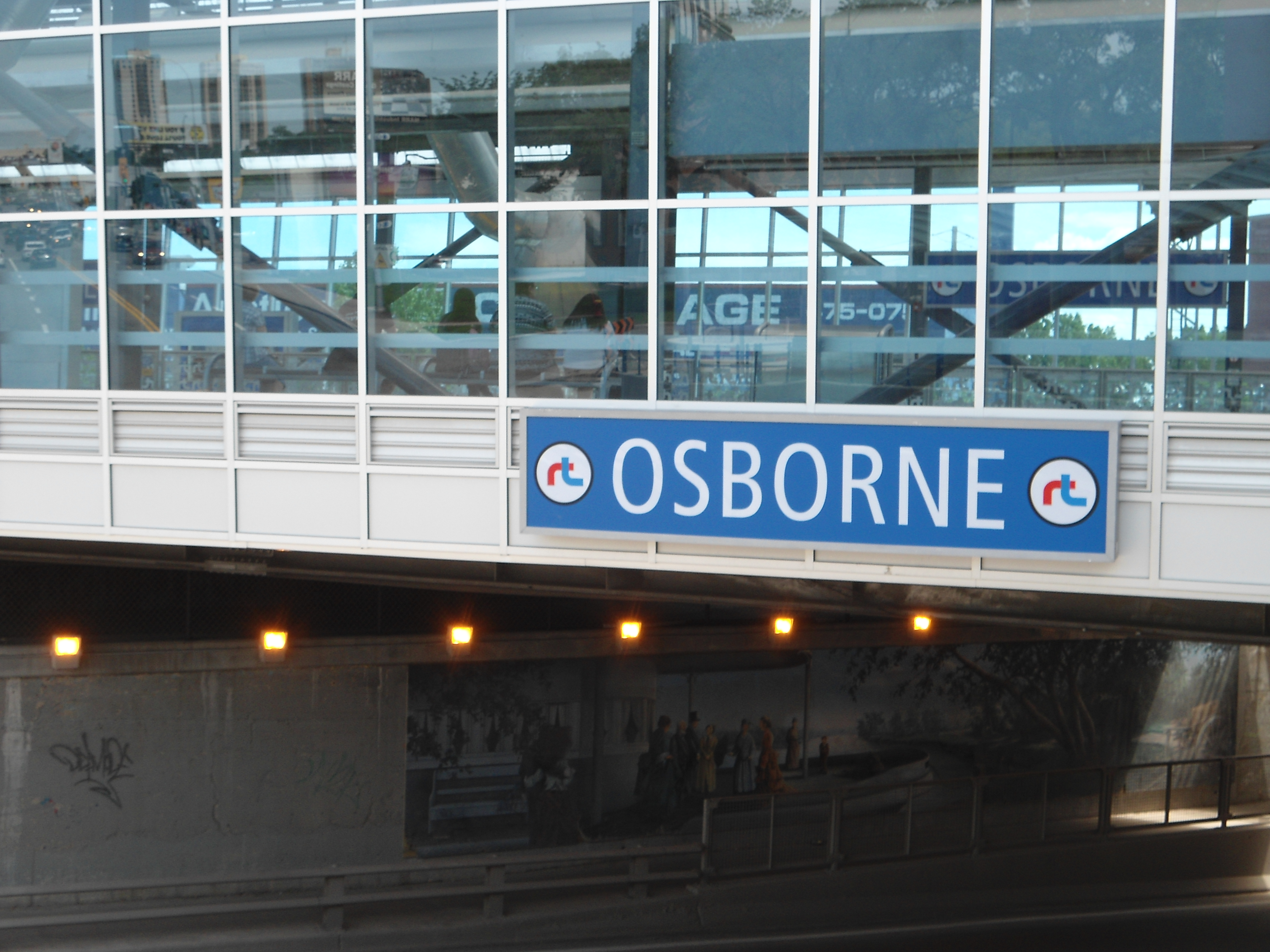
- A close-up picture on Osborne Station.

Overview
- Locale: Winnipeg, Manitoba, Canada.
- Transit type: Bus rapid transit
- Number of lines: 1
- Number of stations: 16
- Website: https://info.winnipegtransit.com/en/service/blue-rapid-transit/

Operation
- Began operation: April 2012
- Operator: Winnipeg Transit

Technical
- System length: 4 km (2.5 mi)

Winnipeg Rapid Transit is a bus rapid transit system of Winnipeg Transit in Winnipeg, Manitoba, Canada, currently consisting of the BLUE line. The system's only route runs on both dedicated transitway and arterial road in Southern Winnipeg. Future expansions are in the planning stages, consisting of an Eastern Corridor connecting downtown to Transcona and a West-North Corridor connecting St. James with Downtown and West Kildonan.

== History ==
The timeline of accomplishing some form of rapid transit in the Winnipeg area goes back to the late 1950s, when the Greater Winnipeg Transit Commission hired an urban planner from Toronto to design a subway for Winnipeg.

The Future Development of the Greater Winnipeg Transit System recommended 3 semi-circular lines intersecting at various points in the metro area. Combined, these three rapid transit lines would have cost $449 million.

During the 1960s when the Greater Winnipeg Development Plan was being written, the Metropolitan Corporation of Greater Winnipeg studied a future transit system for the region. In their report, Winnipeg Area Transportation Study: Projections & Recommendations (Vol. 3), a 5.4-mile (8.69 km) underground subway system between Polo Park Shopping Centre and Henderson and Hespeler Avenue in Elmwood was recommended. The WATS study did computerized modelling for a bus only transit system, but found it woefully inadequate for a metro population of 781,000 in 1991.

The transit system visualized in this scheme would involve the introduction of 36 different transit routes totalling 622 route miles and requiring a fleet of 1,090 buses. Such an operation would ensure that, on the average, in the peak hours, buses in the metropolitan area would be spaced at 3.38 minute intervals along their routes. This compares with 6.43 minutes under the system in operation in 1962.

In 1972, Mayor of Winnipeg Steve Juba advocated for a suspended monorail operating along Portage Avenue and later St. Vital. Juba said that it would be cheaper to construct than a subway. Cost estimates were $22 million for the completed project, or $1 million per mile. At the time, the only monorail operating in North America was the Seattle monorail. While Juba was away, City Council held a vote on the monorail, which was lost.

After the amalgamation of Winnipeg with its suburbs in 1972 and the creation of Winnipeg Transit, the newly created transit department completely changed its view on rapid transit, opting for Bus Rapid Transit (BRT) instead, and changing where it should initially go to between downtown Winnipeg and the Fort Garry campus of the University of Manitoba. Deleuuw Dillon was hired to create a plan for bus rapid transit, now the Southwest Transit Corridor. However, politicians balked at the cost of any form of rapid transit—rail or bus, due to the very high initial construction costs. Dillon Consulting remains involved in planning for Southwest BRT.

In 2002, Mayor Glen Murray pushed for BRT as the mode choice for the Southwest Transit Corridor using guided bus technology like that in the Essen, Germany. He made a deal with Premier Gary Doer that would see the construction of the Kenaston Underpass, the construction of the Manitoba Hydro headquarters downtown, and the construction of Phase I of the Corridor. All projects except the BRT were funded and constructed. Murray quit his job as Mayor to run for a seat in the 2004 Federal election, which he lost.

The next Mayor, Sam Katz, promised to cancel a $43-million federal grant for the Southwest Transit Corridor and use that for improving recreation centres. At the same day of the 29 September 2004 vote on rapid transit, 25-year (1979–2004) veteran Transit Director Rick Borland quit the position and retired over the issue when one of Katz's advisors, Bryan Gray, criticized a report by Winnipeg Transit used to request funding for the busway.

In November 2004, Katz visited Ottawa and rode the O-Train (now Line 2). Katz commented "And it's new, it's innovative -- it's the 21st century. There's no reason in my mind that we shouldn't explore this."

Instead, Katz formed an ad hoc group, chaired by Councillor Wyatt (Transcona), in the same ward that New Flyer has its manufacturing plant, to complete a study on the viability of LRT for Winnipeg, though Katz could not accomplish an LRT for Winnipeg. The Rapid Transit Task Force report was released in 2005.

Columnist Tom Brodbeck wrote in a September 2004 Winnipeg Sun article that there had been no cost-benefit analysis of the BRT project.

As a compromise, Katz allowed Phase I of BRT that "could be converted to LRT at a later date." Papers were signed in September 2008, with construction beginning during the Summer of 2009.

On April 8, 2012, Phase 1 of the Southwest Transitway opened.

On April 12, 2020, Phase 2 of the Southwest Transitway opened.

== Southwest Transitway ==
The Southwest Transitway is a dedicated bus rapid transit roadway in Winnipeg, Manitoba, Canada, which commenced operation in April 2012.

The first section was built parallel to the railway tracks running southwest from Queen Elizabeth Way at The Forks to Pembina Highway at Jubilee Avenue. An extension from Jubilee Avenue to Markham Road and the University of Manitoba was then built, which opened on April 12, 2020. Bus rapid transit services through the downtown Winnipeg area use the Graham Avenue Transit Mall and other bus priority routes.

=== Phase 1 ===
Phase 1 of the Southwest Transitway commenced operation on 8 April 2012. The first section runs parallel to the railway tracks in a southwest direction from Queen Elizabeth Way (near The Forks) to Pembina Highway at Jubilee Avenue. Bus rapid transit services through the downtown Winnipeg area used the Graham Avenue Transit Mall and other bus priority routes.

Jubilee Station was the last one to be constructed and was completed on June 21, 2015. City Council was set to vote on approval of the station's construction in late 2012. It had a construction budget of C$3.9 million, with costs shared between the city (43%) and developer Gem Equities (57%). Due to cost overruns, Jubilee Station's actual cost was C$8.8 million after construction. The City owed more than C$1.3 million back to Gem to equalize the shared costs.

Funding was approved for the planned extension of the transitway south from the Jubilee interchange to Bison Drive and the University of Manitoba. A funding announcement was made in February 2015, construction began in late 2016, project completion in Fall of 2019. Driver testing commenced in the Fall of 2019, with plans to begin service on 8 April 2020.

Winnipeg Transit tried to mitigate pigeon droppings at Osborne Station, but in 2018 it was still a problem at that location. Winnipeg Transit sought advice from Orkin Canada who recommended using OvoControl P in nearby bird feeders to control the pigeon population.

=== Phase 2 ===
Phase 2 of the Southwest Transitway commenced operation on 12 April 2020. Phase 2 of the project saw the Southwest Transitway extended from the Jubilee Overpass, through the Parker Lands and the Manitoba Hydro right of way before joining the CN Lettelier line north of Abinojii Mikanah. The Transitway then goes through Waverley Heights to Markham Road, where BLUE buses continue to the University of Manitoba or to St. Norbert.

In March 2019, Winnipeg Transit introduced a new route structure, which begun at the opening of Phase 2 (12 April 2020). Previously, the Southwest Transitway operated as an "Open Busway" design. The new "Spine & Feeder" routing is similar in functionality to rail-transit lines. Switching to "Spine & Feeder" meant that Winnipeg Transit has significantly changed its ideology since 1973, when it began promoting BRT, as the "Open Busway" ensured a "one-seat ride" and "spine & feeder may require a transfer to and from a feeder bus in the Fort Garry, Fort Richmond, and St. Norbert communities. The advantage of the spine & feeder design is there will be fewer buses entering the downtown area, being delayed by traffic congestion on downtown streets and along the Graham Avenue Transit Mall and as a result there will be less wear and tear on affected roadways.

Parker Station (now Beaumont Station) was put on hold, pending legal settlements. It will be part of a future single-family and multi-family neighbourhood, Fulton Grove, situated within the Parker lands planning area. The station will be located between the existing Jubilee and Beaumont stations.

Financing Phase 2's estimated $590-million cost will be split three ways: $225m provincially, $140m federally, and $225m municipally. Of the city's share, $19.7-million will have to be budgeted annually for the project, starting in 2020. In order to raise the revenue to pay the costs, one or a combination of "cash-to-capital funding, a property tax increase, [or] a transit fare increase" would be needed, according to the Dillon report of 2014.

=== Stations ===
Station	Routes	Amenities							Description
Station	Routes	Park and Ride	Kiss and Ride	Bike rack & locker	Heated Shelter	Electronic sign	Bench	Public Art	Description
Harkness Station	BLUE, FX3, D16			Yes	Yes	Yes	Yes		Located at the north end of the Southwest Transitway, south of the intersection of Harkness Avenue and Stradbrook Avenue. A transfer point for Route D16.
Osborne Station	BLUE, FX3					Yes	Yes		Designed by architectural and landscape company ft3, it was constructed on a bridge over Osborne Street near Osborne Junction. This station is the only fully covered station on the Southwest Transitway. There is an entry and exit point to Warsaw Avenue south of the station for Route FX3. According to City of Winnipeg documents, Osborne Station cost upwards of $30 M when completed.
Fort Rouge Station	BLUE, F5, 557		Yes	Yes	Yes	Yes	Yes		Located in the Fort Rouge Yards area off Morley Avenue.
Jubilee Station	BLUE, 557, 895			Yes	Yes	Yes	Yes		Jubliee Station is located just northeast of the Pembina Highway overpass. It opened on June 21, 2015, and includes geothermal heating to clear the platform of snow and ice. Transfers can be made to Route 895 on Station Place, with service to Osborne Street and Riverview. Directly across the tracks is a retail area comprising a Dollar Tree and the Salisbury House restaurant.
Beaumont Station	BLUE, D11, 641, 649, 677		Yes	Yes	Yes	Yes	Yes	Rooster Town Kettle	Located north of Parker Avenue, at the north end of Beaumont Street, just east of Georgina Street. Connections to/from Pembina Highway can be made with Route D11, and to/from Waverley Street with Routes 641 and 677.
Seel Station	BLUE, 28, 642, 649, 650, 679, 680, 690, 691, 694	Yes		Yes	Yes	Yes	Yes	Furrows on the Land (The Field) and Furrows in the Land (The Wheel)	Located at the east end of Seel Avenue, north of McGillivray Boulevard.
Clarence Station	BLUE, 690, 691, 694 (Nearby)	Yes		Yes	Yes	Yes	Yes	ROW ROW ROW	Located north of Clarence Avenue, between Marshall Crescent and Irene Street.
Chevrier Station	BLUE, 649 (Nearby), 691, 694 (Nearby)			Yes	Yes	Yes	Yes	Salt Fat Sugar & Your Water is Safe	Located north of Chevrier Boulevard, between French Street and Hervo Street. Connections to/from Pembina Highway can be made with Route 649.
Plaza Station	BLUE			Yes	Yes	Yes	Yes	テンサイ (Tensai)	Located at the west end of Plaza Drive, north of Abinojii Mikanah.
Chancellor Station	BLUE, 676 (Nearby), 678 (Nearby)			Yes	Yes	Yes	Yes	(Un)Still Life with Spoked Wheels	Located north and south of Chancellor Drive, between Gaylene Place and Gull Lake Road. The St. Norbert and University of Manitoba branches of route BLUE split south of this station. Connections to/from Pembina Highway can be made with Route 676 and 678.
Markham Station	BLUE (St. Norbert), 662, 678			Yes	Yes	Yes	Yes	Métis Land Use	Located at the south end of the Southwest Transitway, north of Markham Road.
Southpark Station	BLUE (U of M), 662, 678				Yes		Yes		On-street stop located on Southpark Drive, northeast of Markham Station, west of Pembina Highway.
Stadium Station	BLUE (U of M)				Yes				Located at the east end of Bohemier Trail, west of University Crescent. Terminal for extra service operating to Princess Auto Stadium on game days.
University of Manitoba Station	BLUE (U of M), F8, F9, 74, 662, 671, 672, 679, 889			Yes	Yes	Yes	Yes		Located on a short section of busway at the east end of Dafoe Road on University of Manitoba grounds. It is the terminus for all routes serving the University of Manitoba.

=== Routes ===
The following table lists all routes that travel on part or all of the Southwest Transitway, excluding routes which only enter the Transitway at a station to facilitate transfers:

Route Number & Name	Termini	Stops on the Southwest Transitway	Notes
BLUE	Unicity Hub, University of Manitoba / St. Norbert	All stops (except Markham Station on the U of M branch)	The main route on the Southwest Transitway, travelling on its entire length.
FX3 Regent - Grant	Redonda Loop, Sturgeon at Silver	Osborne, Harkness	Enters/exists the Southwest Transitway via Warsaw Avenue just south of Osborne Station.
F5 McPhillips - Donald	Garden City Hub, Fort Rouge Station	Fort Rouge	Enters/exists the Southwest Transitway via Warsaw Avenue just south of Osborne Station.
557 Island Lakes - Morley	Sage Creek, Windermere Loop	Jubilee, Fort Rouge	Enters/exists the Southwest Transitway via Jubilee Overpass just south of Jubilee Station, and at Fort Rouge Station onto Morley Avenue. Weekday service only.
649 Chevrier	Fort Whyte, Seel Station	Beaumont, Seel	Enters/exists the Southwest Transitway via Jubilee Overpass just south of Jubilee Station.
690 Industrial	West Fort Garry Industrial, Seel Station	Clarence, Seel	Enters/exists the Southwest Transitway via Clarence Avenue just south of Clarence Station. Weekday peak direction service only.
691 Whyte Ridge	Whyte Ridge, Seel Station	Chevrier, Clarence, Seel	Enters/exists the Southwest Transitway via Chevrier Avenue just south of Chevrier Station. Weekday peak direction service only.

== Eastern Transitway ==
The eastern corridor is a planned bus rapid transit line from downtown Winnipeg to Transcona.

=== Alignment Options ===
St. Boniface Option — the line would cross the Red River near Blue Cross Park and go through North St. Boniface and Whittier Park, crossing Archibald Street and going through the Mission Industrial Park terminating near Kildonan Place Shopping Centre.

Point Douglas Option — the line would see improvements to Higgins Avenue and a transit only bridge crossing the Red River, going through the Mission Industrial Park terminating near Kildonan Place.

Further public consultations on routing options will take place in October 2019, as no firm decisions have been made. However, since then further planning and decision-making on the Eastern Corridor has been put on hold, commensurate with the release of the Final Draft of the Transit Master Plan, expected Winter 2020.

== North-West Transitway ==
The north-west corridor is a proposed bus rapid transit line that would use either the median or curb lanes along Portage Avenue from Polo Park to downtown, continuing on Main Street all the way to Inkster Boulevard in West Kildonan.

The airport link is a proposed bus rapid transit link connecting Winnipeg James Armstrong Richardson International Airport to the North-West Corridor.

== Other related works ==
The City of Winnipeg used the Phase 2 project as an opportunity to rebuild and expand the Jubilee Underpass, which has a history of flooding during heavy rainfalls in the Summer. Storm drains are being upgraded to prevent flooding. The CN Portage Junction Overpass, constructed in 1948 was replaced by a modern structure in 2018.
