= Outlet Collection Winnipeg =

Outlet shopping centre in Manitoba, Canada

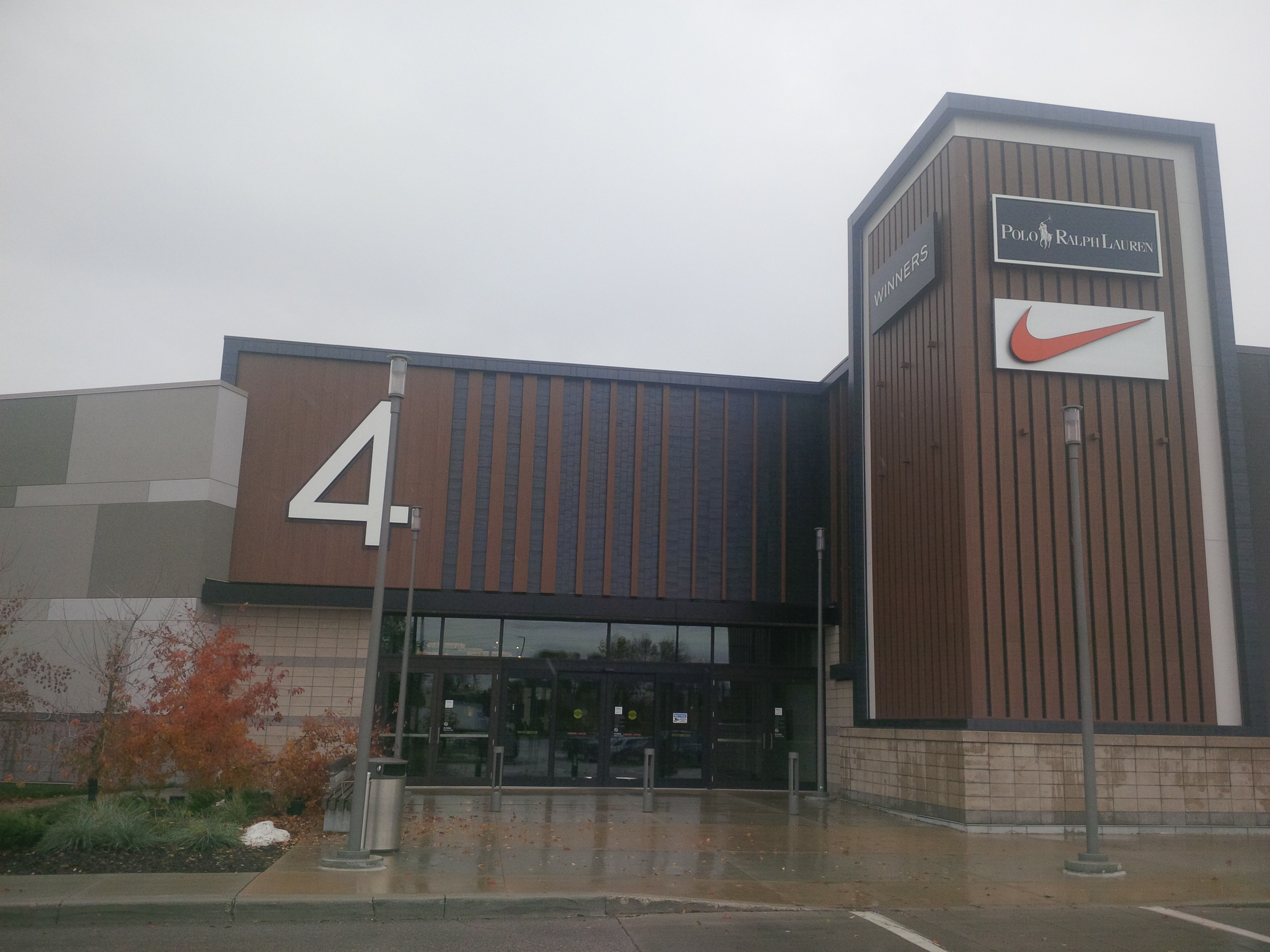
- Location: Winnipeg, Manitoba, Canada
- Coordinates: 49.845388°N 97.213175°W
- Address: 555 Sterling Lyon Parkway
- Opened: May 3, 2017
- Developer: Ivanhoé Cambridge
- Manager: Ivanhoé Cambridge (trading as La Caisse)
- Owner: La Caisse
- Num. of stores: 100
- Num. of anchor tenants: 6
- Floor area: 570,000 square feet (53,000 m^{2})
- Floors: 1
- Parking: 2,300
- Public transit: Winnipeg Transit; 74 664 677
- Website: outletcollectionwinnipeg.com

Outlet Collection Winnipeg is a fully-enclosed shopping centre development located on the intersection of Sterling Lyon Parkway and Kenaston Boulevard, in Winnipeg, Manitoba, Canada. It was developed by Ivanhoé Cambridge, a major Canadian real-estate company.

== History ==
After the opening of the first IKEA in Winnipeg on the intersection of Kenaston Boulevard and Sterling Lyon Parkway in December 2012, retail quickly began to expand starting with a Cabela's, later joined by restaurants, other small retailers, and residential properties.

Ivanhoe Cambridge decided to expand the retail development in the new expanding retail along Kenaston Boulevard just across from IKEA, breaking ground in September 2015 and costing $200 million to build.

=== Opening ===
On May 3, 2017, the mall officially opened its doors to large crowds and showcased 28 new stores to Winnipeg, being the first dedicated outlet mall in Manitoba.

== See also ==
- Vaughan Mills
- Tsawwassen Mills
- CrossIron Mills
