= Polo Park =

Shopping centre in Manitoba, Canada

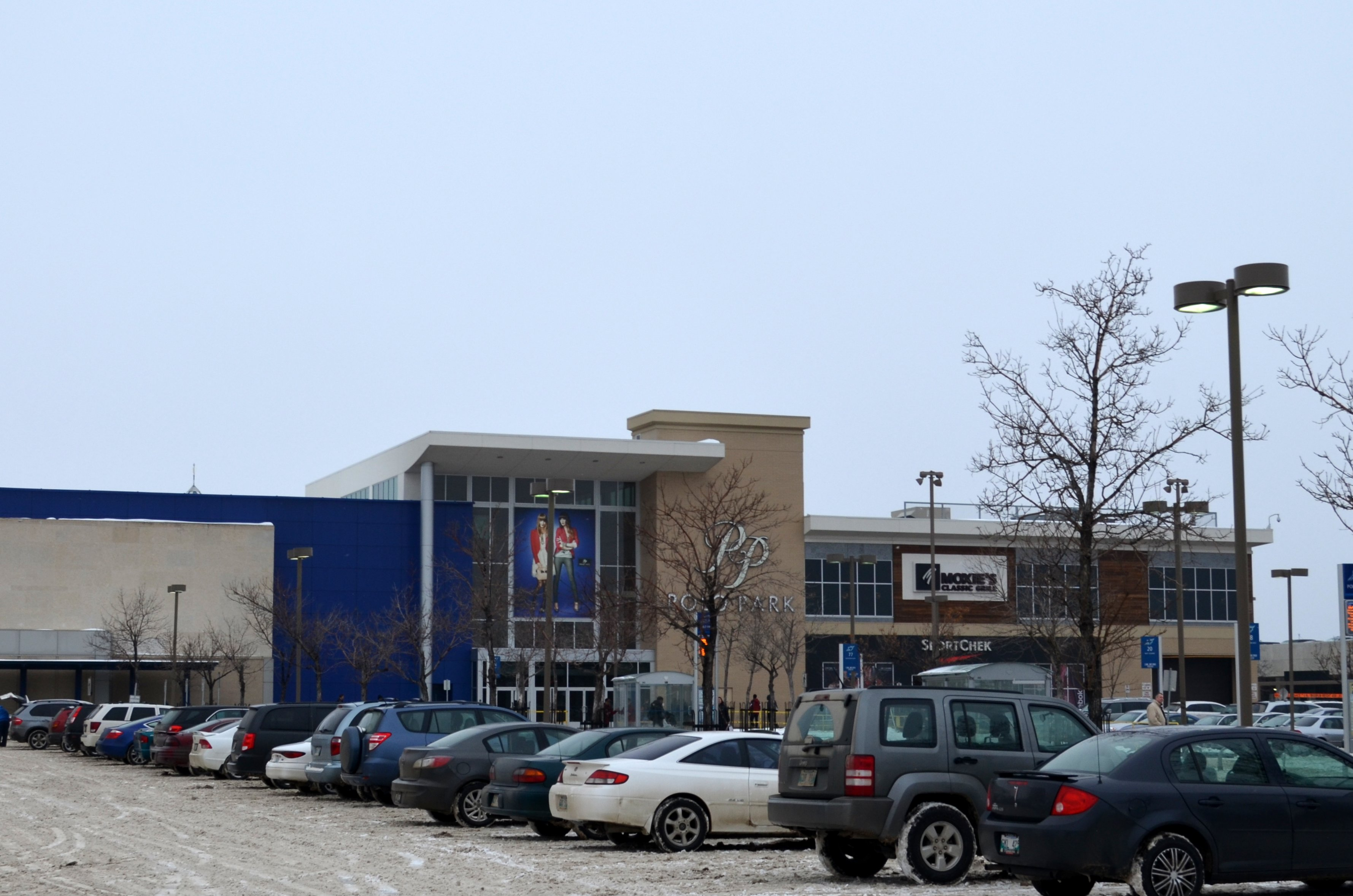
- Location: Winnipeg, Manitoba, Canada
- Coordinates: 49.8838°N 97.199°W
- Address: 1485 Portage Avenue
- Opened: August 20, 1959; 67 years ago
- Manager: Cadillac Fairview
- Owner: Cadillac Fairview (50%); Shindico Realty (50%)
- Num. of stores: 200+
- Num. of anchor tenants: 5
- Floor area: 1,202,000 square feet (111,700 m^{2})
- Floors: 2
- Public transit: Winnipeg Transit
- Website: polopark.ca

Polo Park (corporately styled as CF Polo Park) is a shopping centre in Winnipeg, Manitoba, Canada. It is situated on the former Polo Park Racetrack near the junction of Portage Avenue and St. James Street. Its grounds also includes a Scotiabank Theatre (formerly SilverCity), a Party City, and an Earls. The mall is currently anchored by Shoppers Drug Mart, Urban Planet, Sport Chek, Zara, EQ3, Uniqlo, and London Drugs . Hudson's Bay, Sears, Zellers, Target Safeway, and Forever 21 formerly anchored the mall.

It is the largest mall of the 8 malls in the city, and is the 15th largest shopping centre in Canada, ranking between Guildford Town Centre and Laurier Québec.

For census purposes, Polo Park is also the name given to the neighbourhood including and surrounding the shopping centre.

== History ==
The Polo Park Mall opened on Thursday, 20 August 1959, and became one of the first enclosed shopping malls in Canada when a roof was added in 1963, the other being the Park Royal Shopping Centre in BC.

The district was once the sports hub of Winnipeg, with the Winnipeg Arena, Canad Inns Stadium, and Winnipeg Velodrome all being located in the Polo Park neighbourhood. The Velodrome was torn down in the 1990s to make way for a strip mall that includes Home Depot and Chapters. The arena and stadium have also since been demolished and replaced by new retail and office complexes.

The former CKY building is situated next to the mall. It used to house the city's CTV Television Network affiliate, CKY-TV, CKY radio, and FM 92 CITI. It was the original home of the WTN network. Corus Radio Winnipeg then occupied the building since 2011, as part of a lease agreement between Corus Entertainment and Cadillac Fairview, with studios for CJOB 680, CFPG-FM 99.1 and CJKR-FM 97.5 are located on the second floor of the three-story building. After the Corus radio stations relocated to 201 Portage by 2021, the facilities would be taken over by the local Evanov Communications radio stations in 2022, involving CKJS-FM, CFJL-FM, and CHWE-FM.

After Sears Canada closed its location in December 2017 due to bankruptcy, the anchor was redeveloped between March 2018 and October 2021 to house new tenants. As of 2023, most of the space is occupied by EQ3 and Zara. Uniqlo will open on the second floor of the vacant Sears space in Spring 2026.

=== Expansions ===
In the spring of 1968, a $7.5-million expansion of Polo Park was completed. The addition brought a three-storey Eaton's department store to the mall, making Polo Park the second largest shopping centre in Canada at the time.

In 1986, the mall underwent a $75-million renovation that added a second level to the building. This addition was panned by downtown Winnipeg merchants, who voiced their objections to the plan at City Council meetings in 1984; Council approved the expansion nonetheless. The expanded shopping centre opened in mid-August 1986.

Another expansion took place in 2007, which added 20,000 square feet (1,900 m^{2}) and cost $30 million.

A new $49-million expansion to Polo Park opened 1 October 2014 in the former Zellers space on the mall's second level. The redeveloped space included 114,000 sq ft (10,600 m^{2}) of retail space and 17 new stores. The space was again redeveloped in late 2024 and most of 2025 to host a London Drugs location, the chain's second in Manitoba, which opened in late 2025. Some tenants in the redeveloped space were relocated to other areas of the mall, while others' leases were not renewed.

== Complexes ==
Polo Park has also added new retail complexes, which are located on properties adjacent to the north of the mall.

Polo North is located on the site of the former Winnipeg Arena and features Marshalls, Mark's, Skechers, and the new head office of Western Financial. Polo North also used to feature Winnipeg's only Bed Bath & Beyond.

The Plaza at Polo Park—located at the Canad Inns Stadium grounds, adjacent to Scotiabank Theatre—is a mixed-use development that spans over 600,000 sq ft (56,000 m^{2}). It features Winners, HomeSense, Urban Behavior, Winnipeg Metropolitan Region Inc., and the first P. F. Chang's restaurant in Winnipeg. With parking capacity for over 1,200 vehicles, The Plaza was originally built to house Target Canada, which soon after went out of business throughout Canada.

== Bus routes ==
The mall is served by a designated bus hub that accommodates several Winnipeg Transit routes. The following stop/platform assignments are as follows:

| Platform | Stop | Route | | Destination |
|---|---|---|---|---|
| 1 | 10825 | 680 | Cambridge | Seel Station |
| 2 | 10826 | 70 | Roblin | Unicity |
| 3 | 10827 | 22 | Portage | Unicity |
| 4 | 10881 | D16 | Notre Dame | RRC Polytech |
| On-street | 10561 | BLUE | | Unicity |
| On-street | 10561 | FX4 | Portage | Polo Park |
| On-street | 10561 | D15 | Ness | Unicity |
| On-street | 10561 | 74 | Kenaston | University of Manitoba |
| On-street | 10561 | 224 | Sherwin | RRC Polytech |
| On-street | 10562 | BLUE | | University of Manitoba |
| On-street | 10562 | BLUE | | St. Norbert |
| On-street | 10562 | FX4 | Gateway | Raleigh/Knowles |
| On-street | 10562 | D15 | Archibald | Sage Creek |
| On-street | 10562 | D16 | Academy | Polo Park |
| On-street | 10562 | 22 | Portage | Polo Park |
| On-street | 10562 | 70 | Roblin | Polo Park |
| On-street | 10562 | 74 | Keewatin | Waterford Green |
| On-street | 10562 | 224 | Valour | Tecumseh |
| On-street | 10562 | 680 | River Heights | Polo Park |
