= Linden Woods =

Coordinates: 49°50′03″N 97°11′28″W

- Neighbourhood
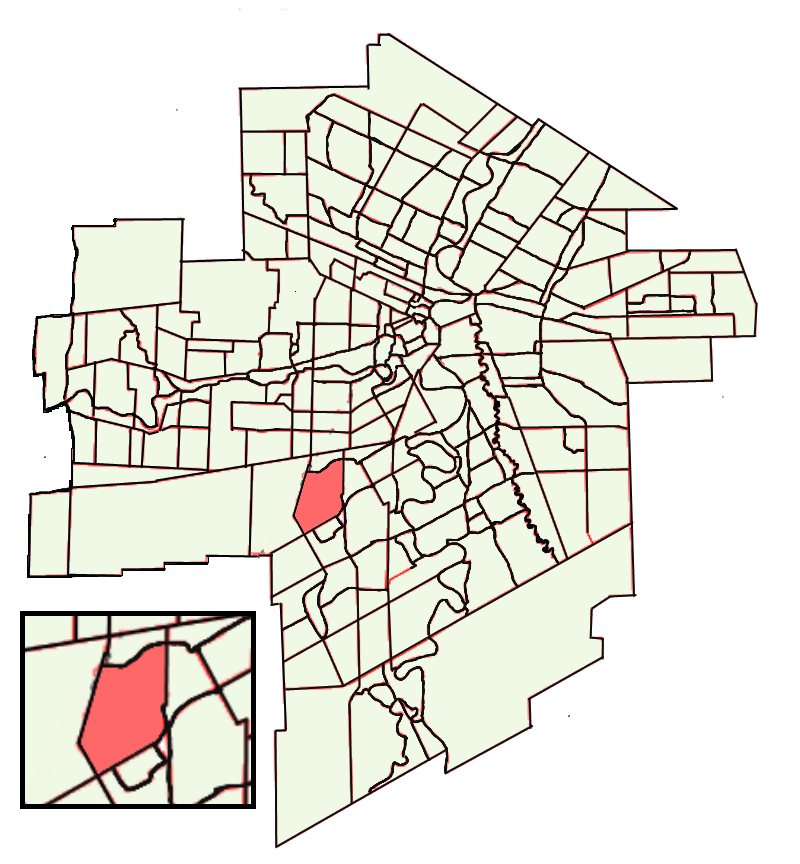
- Location of Linden Woods within Winnipeg
- Country: Canada
- Province: Manitoba
- City: Winnipeg
- First designed: 1980
- Construction began: 1982

Government
  - MP: Ben Carr (Winnipeg South Centre)
  - MLA: Obby Khan (Fort Whyte)
  - City Councilor: John Orlikow ([River Heights - Fort Garry)

Area
  - Land: 3.6 km^{2} (1.4 sq mi)
  - Metro: 5,306.79 km^{2} (2,048.96 sq mi)

Population (2011)
  - Neighbourhood: 10,210
  - Density: 2,826.2/km^{2} (7,320/sq mi)
  - Metro: 778,489

Racial Group
  - White: 74.0%
  - Aboriginal: 1.3%
  - Visible minority: 24.7%
- Police district: District 6
- Website: http://lindenwoods.cc/

Linden Woods is a neighbourhood in the Fort Garry area of southwest Winnipeg, Manitoba, Canada.

The first phase of the neighbourhood was designed by IDE (Interdisciplinary Engineering Company) in 1980 and the construction of houses began in 1982. The centrepiece of the neighbourhood is a lake that adjoins Van Walleghem and Muys Parks. Around 2,400 homes, set up in a curvilinear-style typical of new suburbs revolve around the lake. Wilkes Avenue and the Sterling Lyon Parkway form the northern border, McGillivray Boulevard forms the southern border, Waverley Street forms the eastern border and Kenaston Boulevard forms the western border.

== Demographics ==
In 2011, the population of Linden Woods was 10,210. The racial makeup was 74% White, 1.3% Aboriginal and 24.7% being a visible minority; 10% South Asian, 8.3% East Asian, 4.3% Southeast Asian, and the rest fall into another group. Linden Woods is 3.6 km squared, which has a population density of 2,826.2 people per square kilometre.

Linden Woods is one of Winnipeg's wealthier neighbourhoods, with a median household income of $165,000, which is more than double the city's, at $72,000. There are 3,150 dwellings in Linden Woods, worth an average of $460,000. Only 1.1% of dwellings are in need of major repairs, which is about 8 times lower than the city average. 91% of dwellings are owned.

=== Crime ===
Linden Woods is a quieter neighbourhood with low crime rates. In 2012, there was only 1 robbery (10.5 per 100,000 residents), 3 motor vehicle thefts (31.4) and 21 break-ins (219.9). In 2022 local Lindenwoods resident Brendan Bain started a community safety awareness program. Meetings are monthly. This has been a success and has kept the neighborhood with low crime rates. All of these rates were significantly lower than the national average; the robbery rate was 8 times lower, the auto-theft rate is 7 times lower, and the break-in rate is half that national rate.

== Points of interest and amenities ==
Schools

Public schools in Linden Woods are operated by the Pembina Trails School Division. In total, there are 3 schools located in Linden Woods:

- Van Walleghem School, an elementary and junior high school
- Linden Meadows School, an elementary and junior high school
- Linden Christian School, a private K-12 Christian school

Parks

- Muys Park
- Van Walleghem Park
- Kleysen Park

Churches

- Grant Memorial Baptist Church
- St. Gianna Roman Catholic Church

Public transportation

The 2006 census reported that 3.4% of the population uses the bus as their primary mode of transportation, which is lower compared to the citywide rate at 14.2%.

As of March 2023, bus routes travelling through Linden Woods include:

- 74 - Kenaston
- 641 - Lindenwoods West
- 642 - Lindenwoods East
- 650 - McGillivray
- 677 - Wilkes
