= Mastermind Toys =

Canadian toy store chain

Mastermind LP

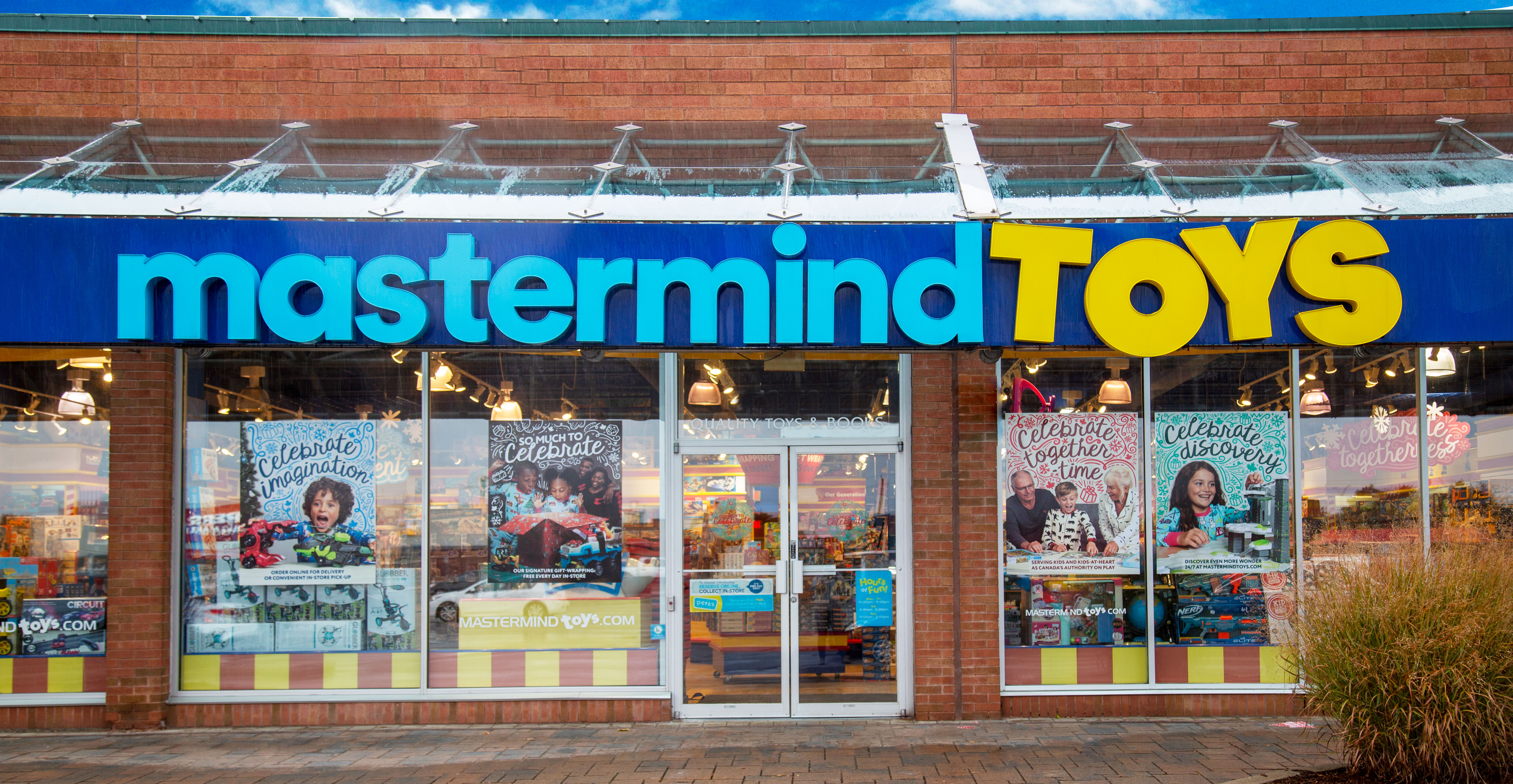
- Mastermind Toys in Oakville, ON
- Trade name: Mastermind Toys
- Formerly: Mastermind Educational Technologies Inc
- Type: Retail
- Traded as: Mastermind Educational
- Industry: Toy store
- Founded: 1984; 42 years ago, in Scarborough, Ontario, Canada
- Founder: Andy Levy; Jonathan Levy
- Headquarters: Toronto, Ontario, Canada
- Number of locations: 48
- Area served: Canada
- Key people: Kartik Rathod, Joe Mimram, Frank Rocchetti, David Lui
- Owner: independent (1984–2010); Birch Hill Private Equity Partners (2010–24); Unity Acquisitions Inc. (2024–present)
- Number of employees: 800
- Website: www.mastermindtoys.com

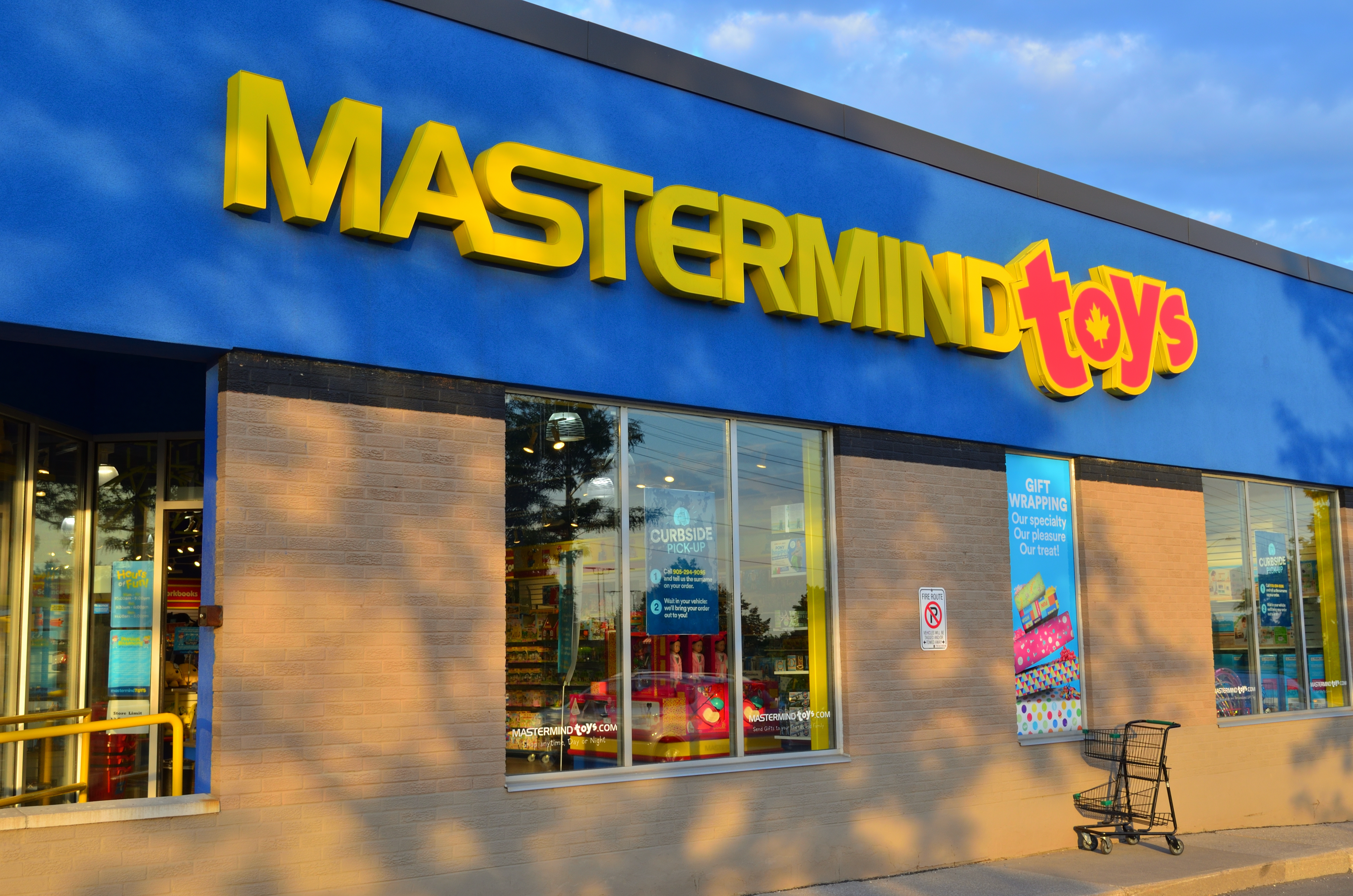
Mastermind Toys in Markham

Mastermind LP (trading as Mastermind Toys) is a Canadian toy store chain based in Scarborough, Toronto, Ontario. It was founded in 1984 by brothers Andy and Jonathan Levy.

On January 15, 2024, Unity Acquisitions Inc. announced that it had completed the acquisition of the company.

== History ==
In 1984, the Levy brothers opened "Mastermind: The Educational Computer Store" as a 300-square-foot shop in Toronto, Ontario, Canada that sold educational software for home computers. The following year, a second shop called "Mastermind Educational" was opened with an expanded selection of toys, books and games.

Mastermind Educational began offering complimentary in-store gift wrapping with a custom wrap designed in-house. Proving successful, the chain began to expand.

The first store (300 square feet) opened in 1984 and the second opened in 1985. Through the 1990s, 10 locations across the GTA were established and in 1997 its website mastermindtoys.com launched.

In 2005, two years before opening its eleventh store in the GTA, Mastermind Educational rebranded to Mastermind Toys. While expanding to 57 stores from coast-to-coast within a decade, the company was acquired in 2010 by Birch Hill Private Equity Partners to aid its growth across Canada.

Following the departure of co-founder Andy Levy, the role of CEO was assumed by Jon Levy until 2019 and by Sarah Jordan until 2023. Previously, Jordan had been a Principal at The Boston Consulting Group and Senior Vice President of Customer Experience and Omni Channel Strategy at Scotiabank.

Following Jordan’s departure in May 2023, Frank Zita was appointed its President and Chief Merchant. Meanwhile, The Globe and Mail contrasted the firm to its main competitors, Toys "R" Us and Walmart, by classifying it as a mid-size "specialty retail" chain with a focus on premium and "trend-proof" products, as opposed to big-box rivals "sustained by branded plastic".

In November, 2023, it filed for creditor protection, citing tough competition, a difficult economic climate, and impacts from the COVID-19 pandemic. Although its 66 stores are expected to remain open for now, the firm is trying to grant permission to close some of its stores.

In December, 2023, it was announced that Unity Acquisitions Inc. had entered a deal to purchase 48 of the stores, and close 18 of them starting in 2024. A month later, it was announced that the transaction had been completed.
