= St. Vital Centre =

Regional shopping centre in Manitoba, Canada

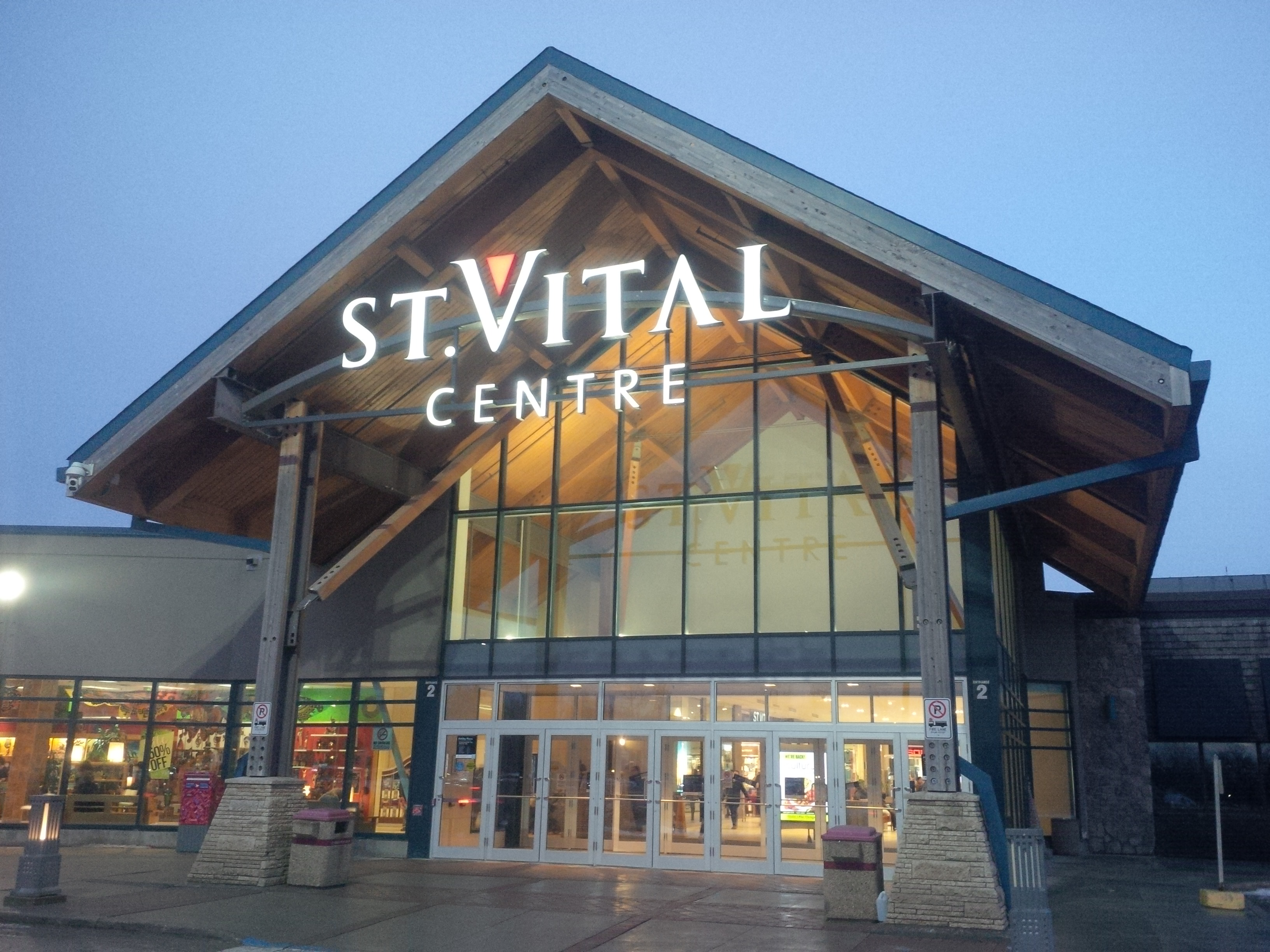
- St. Vital Centre
- Coordinates: 49.8286°N 97.1101°W
- Address: 1225 St. Mary's Road; Winnipeg, Manitoba, Canada, R2M 5L5
- Opened: October 17, 1979; 47 years ago
- Developer: Trizec
- Manager: Leyad
- Owner: Leyad
- Num. of stores: 170
- Num. of anchor tenants: 10
- Floor area: 68 acres (28 ha)
- Floors: 2
- Public transit: Winnipeg Transit
- Website: stvitalcentre.com

St. Vital Centre is a retail shopping mall located at 1225 St. Mary's Road, in Winnipeg, Manitoba, Canada.

== History ==
The 631,000 sq ft (58,600 m^{2}), built on 40 acres (160,000 m^{2}), opened 17 October 1979 and is located by the intersection of St. Mary's Road and Abinojii Mikanah. It opened with Eaton's, The Bay, Woolco and Safeway (Canada) as anchor tenants. The mall was renovated in 1986, 1998, and 2013.

The building has six anchor tenants and 160 smaller stores, and has a gross leasable area of 926,310 sq ft (86,057 m^{2}) including the freestanding Co-op grocery store, Montana's Cookhouse, Old Navy, CIBC, McDonald’s, and Earls. St. Vital Centre is owned by the Ontario Pension Board and was previously managed by 20 VIC Management Inc. to 2017 and Cushman & Wakefield Asset Services ULC to December 2020. Management of St. Vital Centre is now done by BentallGreenOak (Canada) LP.

The mall has 4,661 parking spaces, as well as a city transit bus depot positioned close to an entrance. As of 2001, the mall serves approximately 53,825 households within a 5 kilometre radius, with an average household income of $56,925. The location sees approximately 178,000 pedestrians per week.

The mall recycles plastics and aluminum in their food court, and paper in their offices, and recycles 4,315 metric tons (4,247 long tons; 4,756 short tons) of cardboard every year.

In 2012, the mall underwent a $10-million renovation, which was completed in November 2012. The renovation included new flooring, ceilings, wall coverings and energy efficient lighting.

In 2026 St. Vital Centre was sold to Leyad for $160.5 million from the Ontario Pension board.

== Current anchor tenants ==
- Indigo
- London Drugs
- Mark's
- Marshalls & HomeSense
- SilverCity
- Sport Chek
- Uniqlo
- Walmart Supercentre

== Bus routes ==
The mall is served by a designated bus hub that accommodates several Winnipeg Transit routes. The following stop/platform assignments are as follows:

Platform	Stop	Route		Destination
1	50884	FX2	St. Mary's	St. Vital Centre
2	50882	556	Beliveau	Sage Creek
2	50882	101	South St. Vital On-Request	
3	50883	552	Aldgate	South St. Vital
4	50881	676	North Town	Bridgwater
5	50880	676	Burland	Creek Bend
6	50879	556	Beliveau	Plaza
7	50878	552	Meadowood	Avalon
On-street	51109	FX2	Main	Garden City Centre
