= North Kildonan =

Suburb of Winnipeg, Canada

- Ward
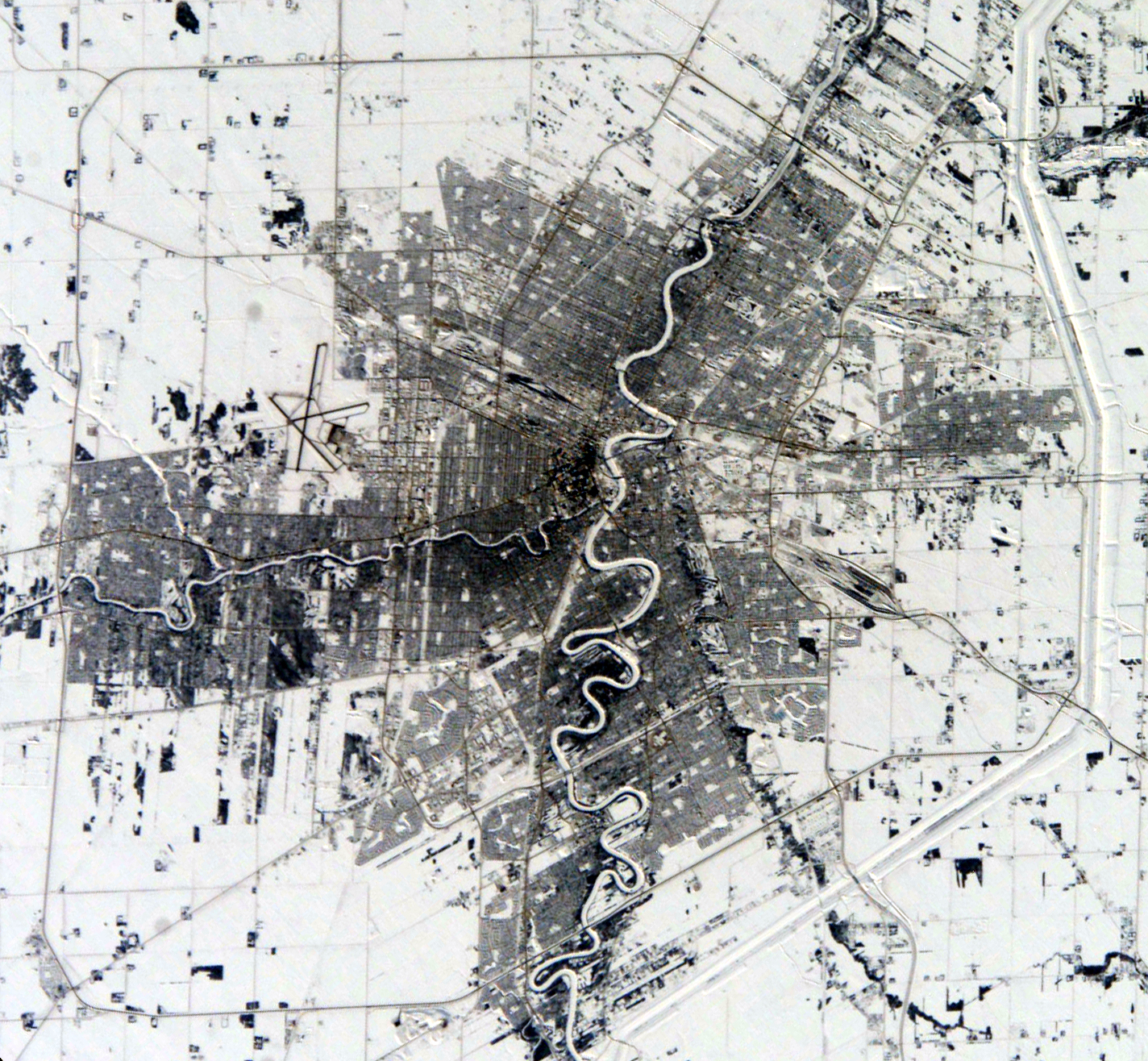
- Location within Winnipeg
- Coordinates: 49°56′27″N 97°05′19″W
- Country: Canada
- Province: Manitoba
- City: Winnipeg
- Incorporated as rural municipality: January 1, 1925

Government
  - MP: Raquel Dancho (Kildonan—St. Paul)
  - MLAs: Tracy Schmidt (Rossmere); Rachelle Schott (Kildonan-River East)
  - City Councillor: Jeff Browaty (North Kildonan)

Area
  - Metro: 5,306.79 km^{2} (2,048.96 sq mi)

Population (2016)
  - Ward: 44,664
  - Metro: 783,099
- Forward Sortation Areas: R2G, R3W
- Area codes: 204, 431

North Kildonan is a suburban neighborhood and city ward in northeastern Winnipeg, Manitoba, Canada. Formerly an independent municipality, it was amalgamated into the City of Winnipeg in 1972 as part of the Unicity restructuring. According to the 2016 Canadian census, the ward had a population of 44,664.

== History ==
Federal census population history of North Kildonan
Year	Pop.	±%
1926	1,019	—
1931	1,347	+32.2%
1936	1,449	+7.6%
1941	1,946	+34.3%
1946	2,338	+20.1%
1951	3,222	+37.8%
1956	4,451	+38.1%
1961	8,888	+99.7%
1966	11,935	+34.3%
1971	17,713	+48.4%
Source: Statistics Canada

Present-day North Kildonan was originally part of the rural municipality (RM) of Kildonan. In 1914, the area was divided into the RMs of West Kildonan and East Kildonan.

During this period, a divergence in priorities emerged within the East Kildonan community. Residents in the urbanized southern section favored significant investment in development and the expansion of civic services. Conversely, the north remained a rural enclave of approximately 1,000 people, with many farms dating back to the Selkirk Settler period. Seeking to maintain their agricultural character, the northern residents petitioned the provincial government for separation. This resulted in the incorporation of the Rural Municipality of North Kildonan on January 1, 1925. Upon incorporation, the new municipality assumed nearly $100,000 in debt, which was fully retired by 1946.

In 1927–1928, land near present-day Edison Avenue and Henderson Highway was sold to Mennonite settlers, mainly chicken farmers and gardeners.

Following the Second World War, suburban expansion led to development in North Kildonan, bringing new housing, roads, and schools.

In 1969, North Kildonan had three wards. It elected a mayor and four counselors.

Map showing the former boundaries of the R.M. of North Kildonan.

In 1972, North Kildonan was amalgamated with the City of Winnipeg, along with the other "Kildonans" and several other municipalities, bringing Winnipeg to its current size.

=== Past reeves ===
Term	Reeve
1925-1937	Herbert C. Whellams (1867-1950)
1938-1943	James Gallagher (1883-1965)
1944-1945	Cornelius Huebert (c. 1905-1973)
1946-1953	James Thomson Findlay Aitken (1900-1971)
1954-1957	Jack Lawrence Pearce (1923-2010)
1958-1961	John Dickson (1908-1961)
1961-1962	Merrill Bruce Whitehead (1913-1988) (acting)
1962-1963	Jack Lawrence Pearce
1964-1965	Stanley Copp (1915-1987)
1966-1971	David Wilfred Pekary (1926-2007)

== Geography ==
North Kildonan is a ward within Winnipeg represented by a member of Winnipeg City Council. Its neighbourhoods include: Rivergrove, Riverbend, Kildonan Drive, Rossmere-A, River East, Springfield North, Springfield South, Valhalla, Kil-Cona Park, and Mcleod Industrial.

The approximate boundary lines of the ward are as follows:

- Glenway Avenue (from Raleigh St. to Henderson Highway),
- Red River (from Glenway Ave. to west of Oakland Ave.),
- Middle of Oakland Ave. (from Henderson Hwy. to Gateway Road),
- Gateway Road (from Oakland Ave. to 100 m north of Blantyre Ave.),
- Line North of Blantyre Ave. (from Gateway Road to Panet Road),
- Panet Road (from line north of Blantyre Ave. to 250 metres south of Almey Ave.),
- Line south of Almey Ave. (from Panet Road to Owen St.),
- Owen St. to Ravelston Ave. West,
- Ravelston Ave. west to Plessis Road,
- Plessis Road to Springfield Road,
- Springfield Road to the line comprising the north boundary of the City of Winnipeg 100 metres west of Wenzel St.,
- Straight line that runs northwest from that location back to the intersection of Raleigh St. and Glenway Ave. (This line runs parallel to, and just north of, Knowles Ave.)

=== Recreation ===
==== Kil-cona Park ====
Kil-cona Park
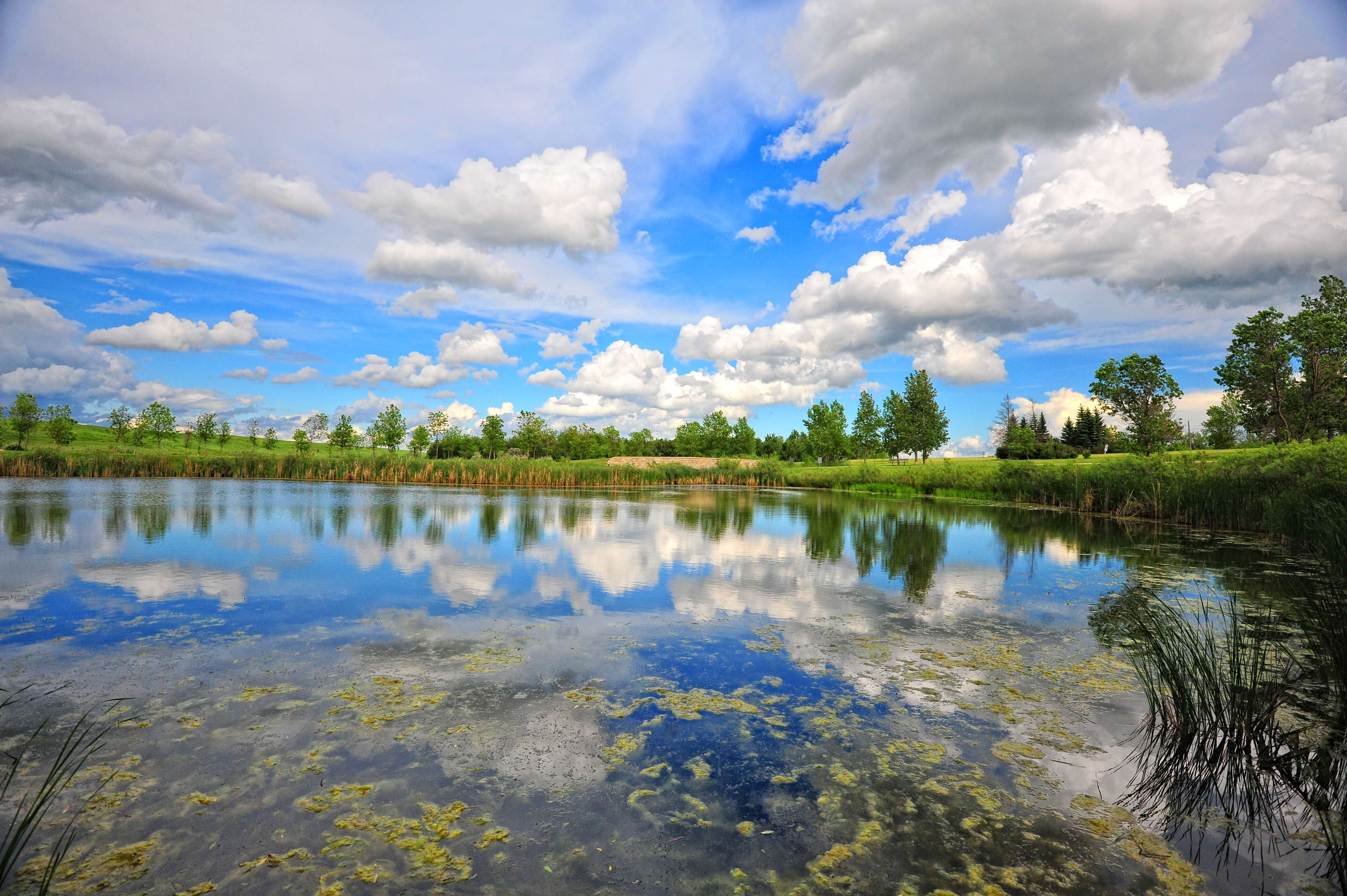
- Interactive map of Kil-cona Park
- Type: Park/open space
- Location: 1229 Springfield Road, Winnipeg, MB R2N 4G4
- Coordinates: 49.93503°N 97.02375°W
- Area: 99.16 ha (991,600 m^{2})
- Paths: 740 m^{2} (8,000 sq ft) of pathways
- Parking: 1 lot, 225 stalls
- Public transit: Winnipeg Transit; 442 106
- Website: City of Winnipeg site

North Kildonan is home to many green spaces, the largest of which is Kil-cona Park, a former landfill site, located on Springfield Avenue east of Lagimodiere Boulevard. The park offers a wide variety of recreational activities and resources, including ponds, open fields, soccer pitches, baseball diamonds, and an off-leash dog area. Located within the park is Harbour View Golf Course & Recreation Complex, with activities including tennis, lawn bowling, nine holes of golf, and pedal boat rides. Winter activities include tobogganing, skating, and cross-country skiing.

==== Bunn's Creek Trail ====
Bunn's Creek Trail is a walking trail that follows the course of Bunn's Creek through the North Kildonan neighbourhood of Winnipeg. The trail runs approximately three kilometers, extending from the Red River through residential areas to Raleigh Street. Access points are located throughout the neighbourhood, with parking and facilities located off McIvor Avenue.

Gateway Recreation Centre

Gateway Recreation Centre is a community sports facility at 1717 Gateway Road offering year-round recreational programming. Facilities include indoor and outdoor hockey rinks, an indoor soccer pitch, multiple soccer fields and ball diamonds, and supporting facilities such as a banquet hall and canteen. Fields are open to the public when not in scheduled use, and ice surfaces and the indoor soccer pitch are available for rental.

=== Crime rates ===
The table below shows the rate of various crimes in each of the North Kildonan neighbourhoods. The crime data spans 5 years from the year 2017 to the year 2021. The rates are crimes per 100,000 residents per year.

Crime Rates per 100,000 people in North Kildonan Neighbourhoods, 2017-2021
Neighbourhood	Pop.	Homicide	Rate (Note: Rate per 100,000 people per year: Figure is calculated by dividing the total instances of a crime by the neighbourhood population, then multiplying by 100,000, and then dividing by 5, as the data spans 5 years)	Robbery	Rate	Agr. Aslt. (Note: Aggravated assault: Includes assaults which cause bodily harm or utilize weapons; includes the following categories given on Winnipeg CrimeMaps: aggravated assault, aggravated sexual assault, assault against peace officer, assault with weapon or causing bodily harm, attempted murder, firearms offences, sexual assault with a weapon.)	Rate	Cmn. Aslt (Note: Common assault: Excludes assaults which cause bodily harm or utilize weapons; includes the following categories given on Winnipeg CrimeMaps: assault against peace officer, common assault, other assaults, sexual assault.)	Rate	Utt. Threat (Note: Abbreviated from: uttering threats)	Rate	Property	Rate
Kil-Cona Park	335	0	0.0	0	0.0	3	179.1	2	119.4	1	59.7	59	3522.4
McLeod Industrial	0	0	--	7	--	2	--	6	--	0	--	251	--
North Transcona Yards	0	0	--	0	--	0	--	4	--	1	--	63	--
River East	7,725	0	0	37	95.8	37	95.8	92	238.2	35	90.6	1208	3127.5
Rossmere-A	13,330	0	0	163	244.6	190	285.1	316	474.1	105	157.5	2720	4081.0
Springfield North	5,820	0	0.0	12	41.2	22	75.6	32	110.0	15	51.5	513	1762.9
Springfield South	1,495	0	0.0	1	13.4	11	147.2	5	66.9	1	13.4	231	3090.3
Valhalla	2,855	2	14.0	6	42.0	6	42.0	21	147.1	8	56.0	321	2248.7
North Kildonan	31,560	2	1.3	226	143.2	271	171.7	478	302.9	166	105.2	5366	3400.5

== Media ==
North Kildonan is referenced by name in the song "None of the Above" by Winnipeg band The Weakerthans.

== See also ==
- List of rural municipalities in Manitoba
