= Bulk Barn =

Canadian bulk foods store chain

Bulk Barn Foods Limited
- Logo since 2015

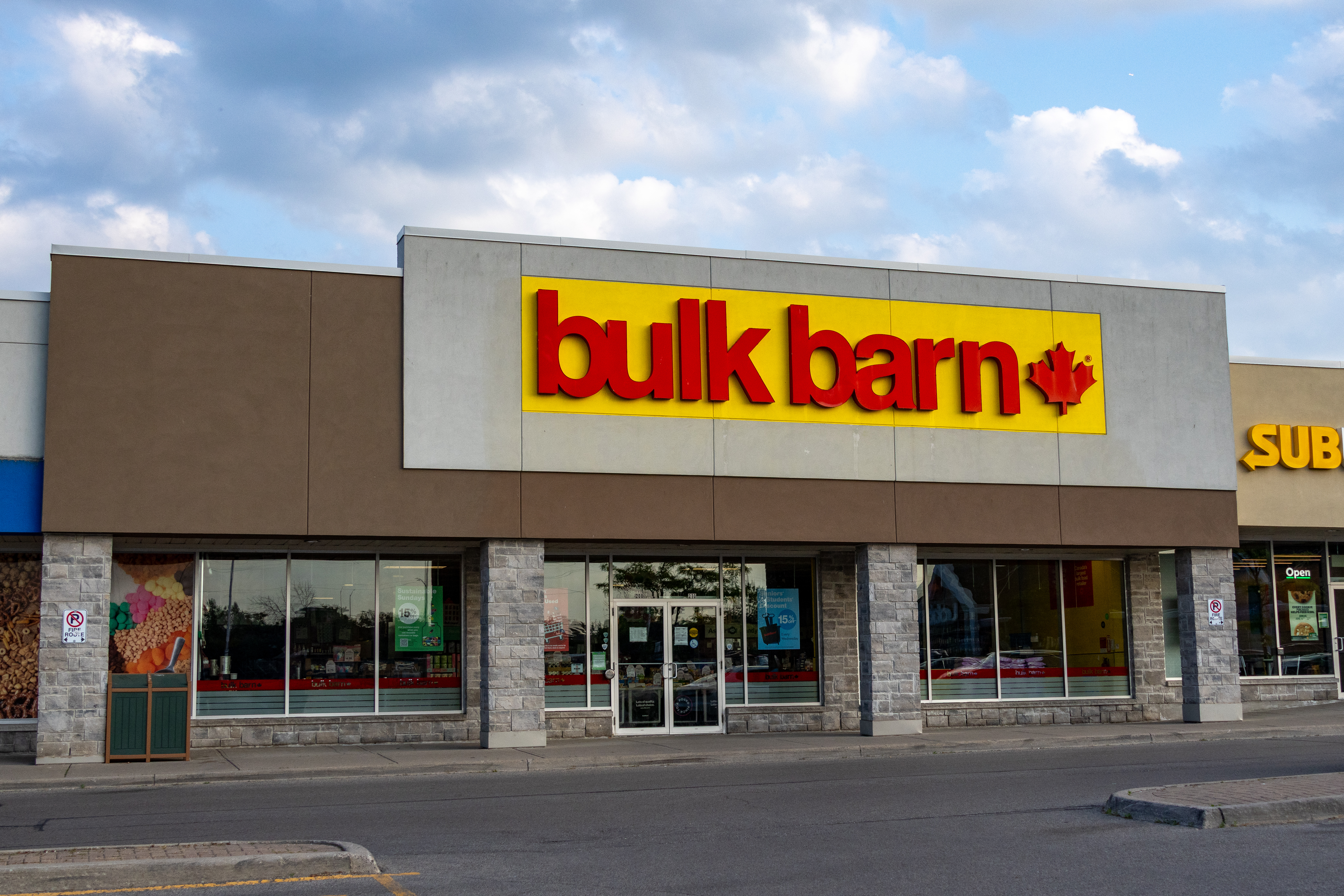
- Bulk Barn store in Bowmanville, Ontario
- Type: Private
- Industry: Retail
- Founded: September 1982; 44 years ago
- Founder: Carl Ofield
- Headquarters: 320 Don Hillock Drive, Aurora, Ontario, Canada
- Number of locations: 275+ stores (2026)
- Area served: Canada
- Key people: Jason Ofield (President and CEO); Craig Ofield (Chairman)
- Website: www.bulkbarn.ca

Bulk Barn Foods Limited is a Canadian retail company specializing in bulk foods and related grocery products. Founded by Carl Ofield in September 1982, the company operates a chain of stores under the Bulk Barn name across Canada. It is the largest bulk-foods retailer in Canada, with its corporate office being located in Aurora, Ontario.

Bulk Barn stores sell a wide variety of products, including baking ingredients, nuts, dried fruits, candy, snacks, spices, cereals, grains, and other food products. The company also sells prepackaged food and non-food products. Its retail format allows customers to purchase a wide variety of items in quantities of their choice.

== History ==
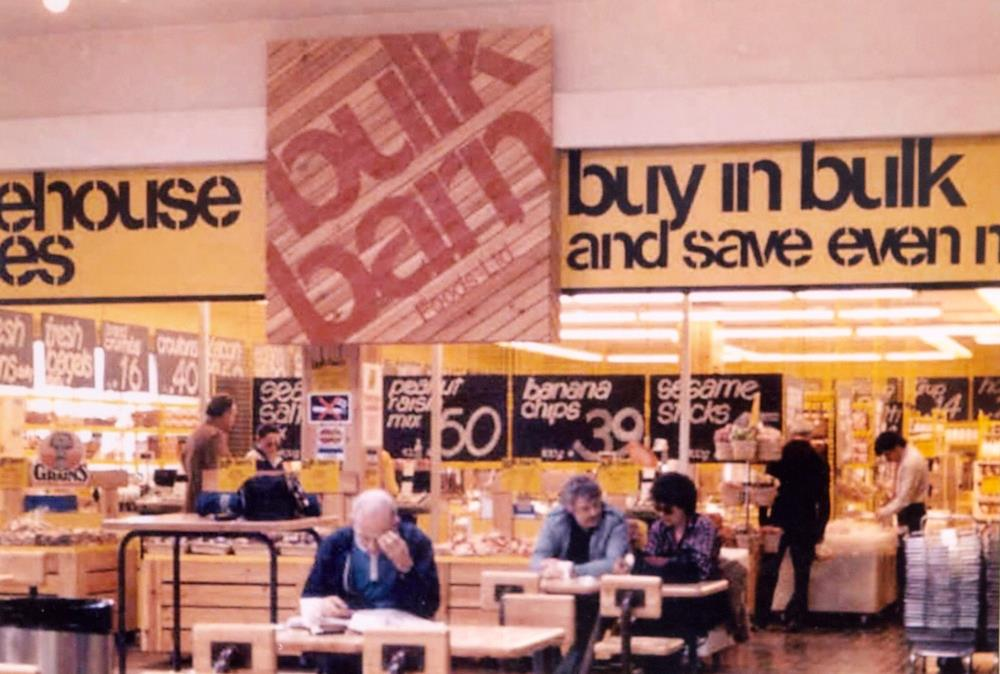
Bulk Barn's second Toronto location – Fairview Mall, c. 1984

=== Founding and expansion ===
Bulk Barn Foods Limited was founded by Carl Ofield in September 1982. The company originally operated stores in shopping malls before expanding into strip plazas and stand-alone locations.

In April 2013, Canadian Grocer reported that the chain had 190 locations across Canada, compared to 140 in 2011. The company’s website states it has grown from one store in 1982 to more than 275 locations. Its 2025 supply chain report describes a chain of more than 280 stores operating in all ten Canadian provinces.

=== Rebranding ===
In 2015, Bulk Barn undertook a rebranding initiative led by Jason Ofield in partnership with Leo Burnett Design. The project updated the company’s logo, colours, storefront design and in-store signage.

Reusable Container Program

In September 2016, Bulk Barn introduced a pilot program at their Liberty Village store in Toronto that allowed customers to shop with their own reusable containers. Customers had their containers inspected and weighed before filling them with bulk products.

The program expanded to additional test stores in 2016, with the company announcing the chain-wide launch of the program in February 2017.

In March 2020, Bulk Barn suspended the program during the COVID-19 pandemic. The company later worked with local public health authorities to resume the program.

== Reusable Container Program ==
Although Bulk Barn is not a zero-waste store, they have been moving towards more sustainable shopping methods. In February 2017, Bulk Barn introduced their Reusable Container Program; where customers could bring their own reusable containers from home, instead of using a disposable plastic bag. The program was paused over the COVID-19 pandemic due to restrictions, but was reintroduced across the chain in collaboration with local health units.

== Promotions ==
Bulk Barn regularly has in-store sales, coupons, and savings for students and seniors. Students and seniors save 15% every Wednesday at any Bulk Barn location.
