= FortWhyte Alive =

Nature preserve in Manitoba, Canada

FortWhyte Alive!
- FortWhyte Alive! Logo
- Formation: 1983; 43 years ago
- Type: Nature preserve
- Headquarters: 1961 McCreary Rd. Winnipeg, Manitoba, Canada
- Coordinates: 49.8202°N 97.2252°W
- Region served: Winnipeg Metro Region
- Official language: English
- President and CEO: Liz Wilson
- Vice-President: Ian Barnett
- Public transit: Winnipeg Transit; 649 650 112
- Website: fortwhyte.org
- Formerly called: Wildlife Foundation of Manitoba; Fort Whyte Nature Centre

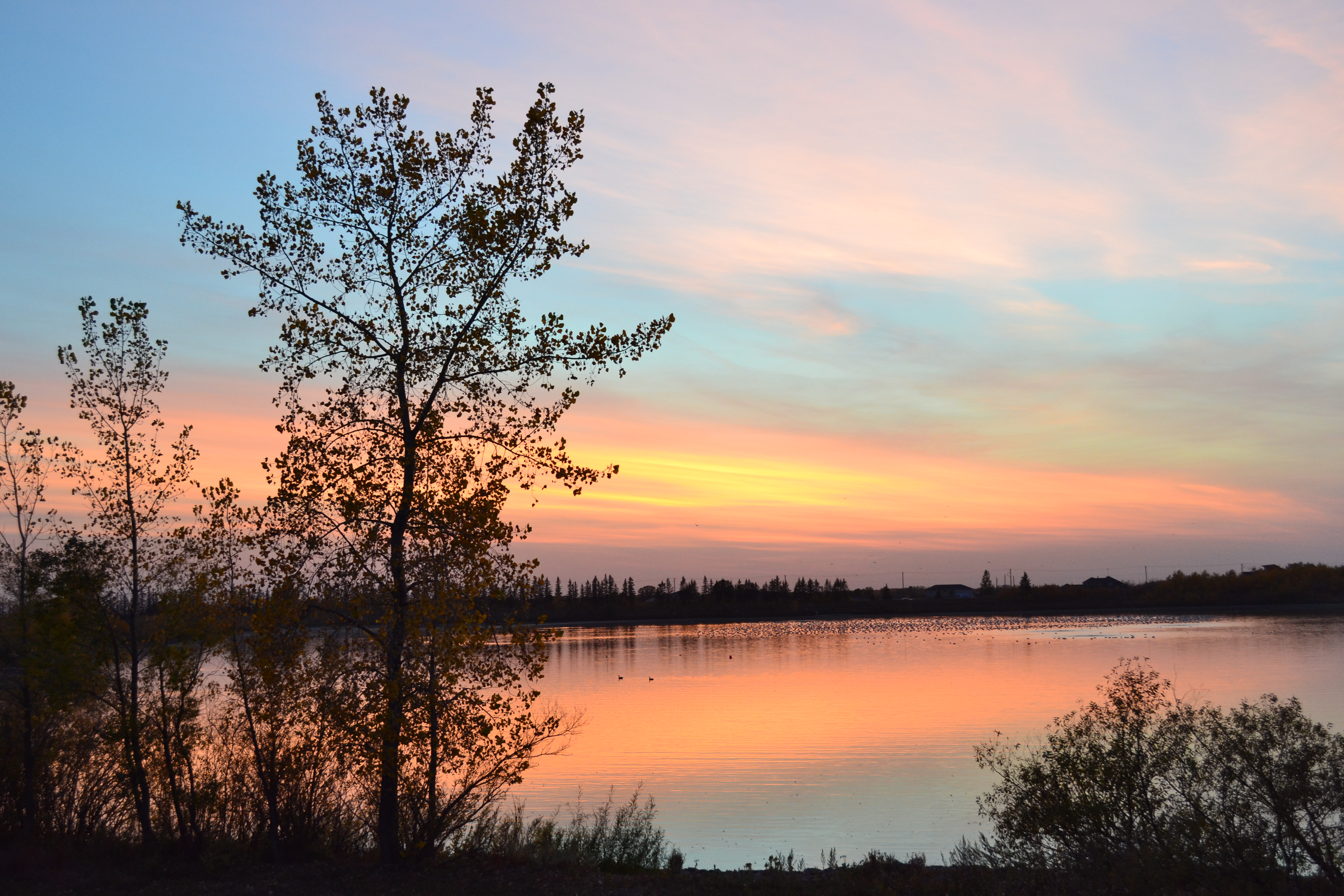
Sunset at FortWhyte in the period of geese migration

FortWhyte Alive is a reclaimed wildlife preserve, recreation area, and environmental education centre in southwest Winnipeg, Manitoba, Canada.

The 640-acre (260 ha) park is located along the migratory path of Canadian geese, and is named after the surrounding community of Fort Whyte. As of 2022, it represents 20% of Winnipeg’s urban green space.

== History ==
The area that now encompasses the present-day space was given the name of Fort Whyte in 1888 by a top official of the Canadian Pacific Railway.

Starting between 1907 and 1912, the Canada Cement Company (later Lafarge) fenced the area off to mine the area for materials. By the 1950s, however, the site became obsolete.

Around this time, the principals of six schools in the Winnipeg Metropolitan Region asked the director of the Science Center of the Winnipeg School Division for assistance in creating a nature trail for children. The Chief of the Manitoba government’s conservation education section reviewed possibilities, then selected Fort Whyte due to its proximity to Winnipeg, comparatively intact woodlands, protection from vandalism, and the presence of lakes that attracted water birds.

In 1955, employees of Canada Cement formed the Lucky 13 Rod & Gun Club to develop a nature trail. The Fort Whyte Waterfowl Sanctuary opened in 1966 and introduced Canada geese and mallards to the site.

The Province of Manitoba would incorporate the Wildlife Foundation of Manitoba that year to operate the facility and "provide facilities and financing for education in the science and art of conservation of wildlife and its habitat." Seeing potential in the old industrial site, they began reclamation work.

In 1974, the Wildlife Foundation developed the site’s first building: the Fort Whyte Nature Centre. This included the Kiwanis Reception Building, as well as a building for waterfowl.

By the 1980s, the organization was replaced by the Fort Whyte Foundation as they shifted their focus from wildlife conservation to environmental education. In the following years, they added new trails, the Fort Whyte Centre for Environmental Education (1983), floating boardwalks (1984), the Kiwanis Touch Museum (1986), beehive interpretive exhibits (1986), and an interpretive aquarium exhibit (1989).

In 2000, Fort Whyte's land base was expanded from 200 acres (81 ha) to 640 acres (260 ha).

== Natural features ==
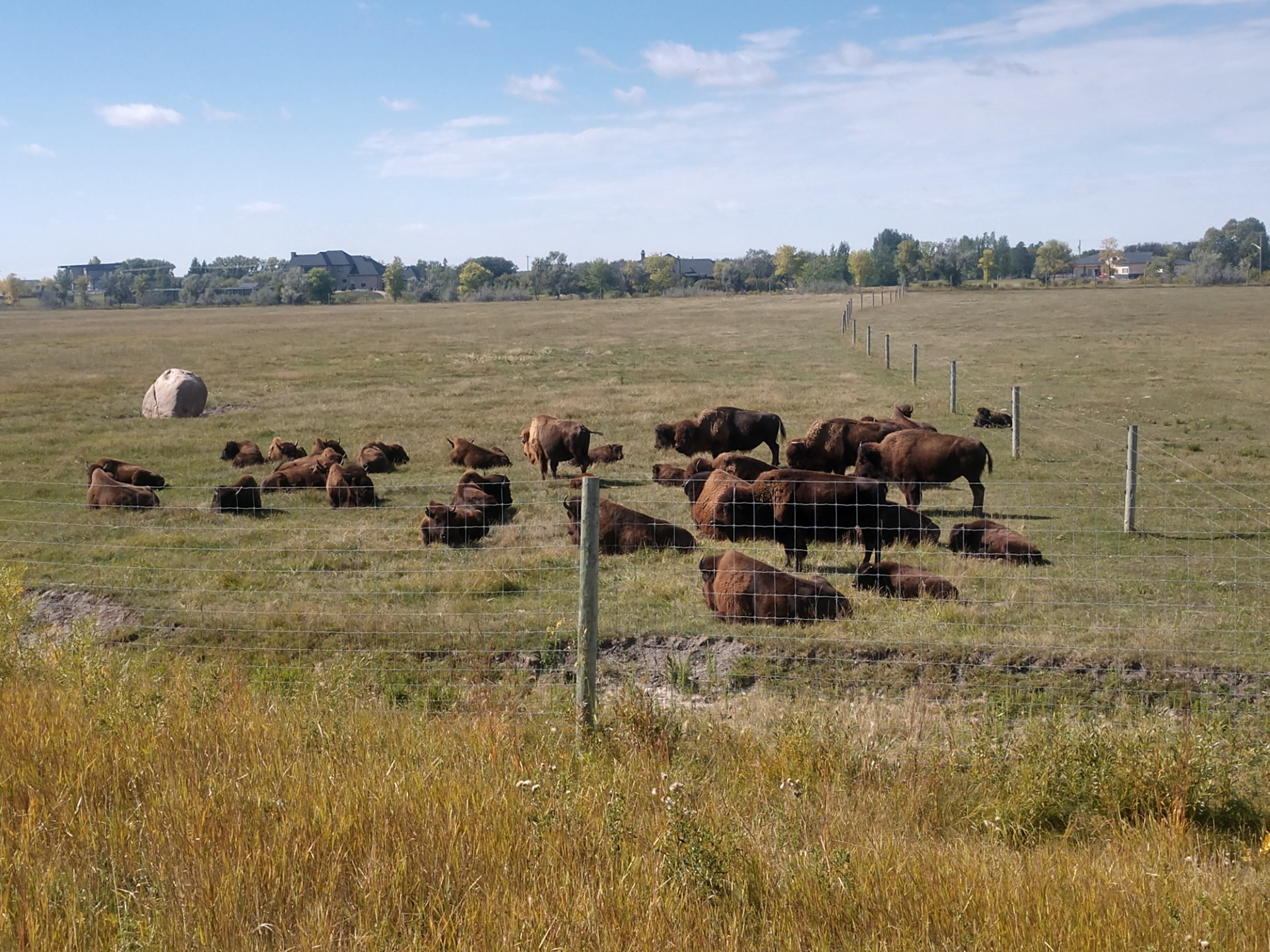
Herd of Bison at Fort Whyte Alive in Winnipeg Manitoba

FortWhyte's 660 acres (270 ha) of prairie, lakes, forest and wetlands include a 70-acre (28 ha) bison prairie and related heritage exhibits; more than 9 kilometres (5.6 miles) of interpretive nature trails; a family treehouse, floating boardwalks, and songbirds, deer and waterfowl in their natural habitat.

== Activities and amenities ==
Year-round fishing is available or visitors can enjoy more contemplative pursuits such as canoeing, hiking or bird-watching. Winter offers unique opportunities to enjoy ice fishing, snowshoeing, skating or tobogganing. FortWhyte's lakes, forest and marsh are well travelled, with over 100,000 visitors benefiting from many programs and exhibits annually.

The 6,700 ft^{2} (620 m^{2}) Alloway Reception Centre offers a broad range of visitor services including The Nature Shop and Buffalo Stone Café.

The 10,000 ft^{2} (930 m^{2}) Interpretive Centre features exhibits including the Aquarium of the Prairies (Manitoba's largest indoor aquarium), the Prairie Partners Room, the Touch Museum, the Climate Change Greenhouse and Prairie Soils dioramas among other exhibits relating to the environment and sustainable development.

=== Education ===
FortWhyte offers curriculum-based educational programs in both French and English to close to 30,000 school children each year; introducing students to the natural world and raising an awareness of their role in sustaining our planet. The FortWhyte Farms initiative allows disadvantaged youth to engage in urban agriculture-based, social and vocational skills training in FortWhyte's beautiful natural setting.
