= Leaf (surname) =

Leaf or Leafe is a surname. Notable people with the name include:

- Alexander Leaf (1920–2012), American physician and research scientist
- Andy Leaf (born 1962), English footballer
- Brad Leaf (born 1960), American-Israeli basketball player in the Israeli Premier League
- Caroline Leaf (born 1946), American filmmaker
- Caroline Leaf (born 1963), cognitive neuroscientist, author and public speaker
- Clifton Leaf, American journalist, editor of Fortune magazine
- Daniel P. Leaf, retired United States Air Force lieutenant general
- Dick Leafe (1891–1964), English footballer
- Eliza Leaf, (c1818–1908), photographer in New Zealand
- Henry Leaf (1862–1931), British 1908 Olympic silver medalist in rackets
- Herbert Leaf (1854–1936), English cricketer
- Howard W. Leaf (1923–2009), US Air Force lieutenant general and fighter pilot
- James Leaf (1900–1972), British Army officer and cricketer
- Jonathan Leaf, playwright and journalist
- Mary Leaf (1925–2004), Mohawk artist specializing in basketmaking
- Mike Leaf (1961–2019), American college basketball coach
- Murray Leaf (born 1939), American social and cultural anthropologist
- Reg Leafe (1914–2001), English FIFA referee in the 1950s and early 1960s
- Richard Leaf (born 1967), British actor
- Robert Leaf (1936–2005), American composer
- Ryan Leaf (born 1976), American former National Football League quarterback
- Lindsay Leaf (born 1985), Juneau Jumper National and Jr. Olympic jump rope champion
- T. J. Leaf (born 1997), Israel-born American NBA basketball player
- Todd Leaf (born 1968-2021), American restaurant owner of Todd's Cookhouse and 1st place holder in Kraft's 1999 Barbecue sauce contest, Todd's Southwest Recipe
- Walter Leaf (1852–1927), English banker, classical scholar and commentator on the Iliad and Odyssey

== See also ==
- Leef (disambiguation), includes list of people with surname Leef
