= Assiniboine Park =

Regional park in Winnipeg, Manitoba, Canada

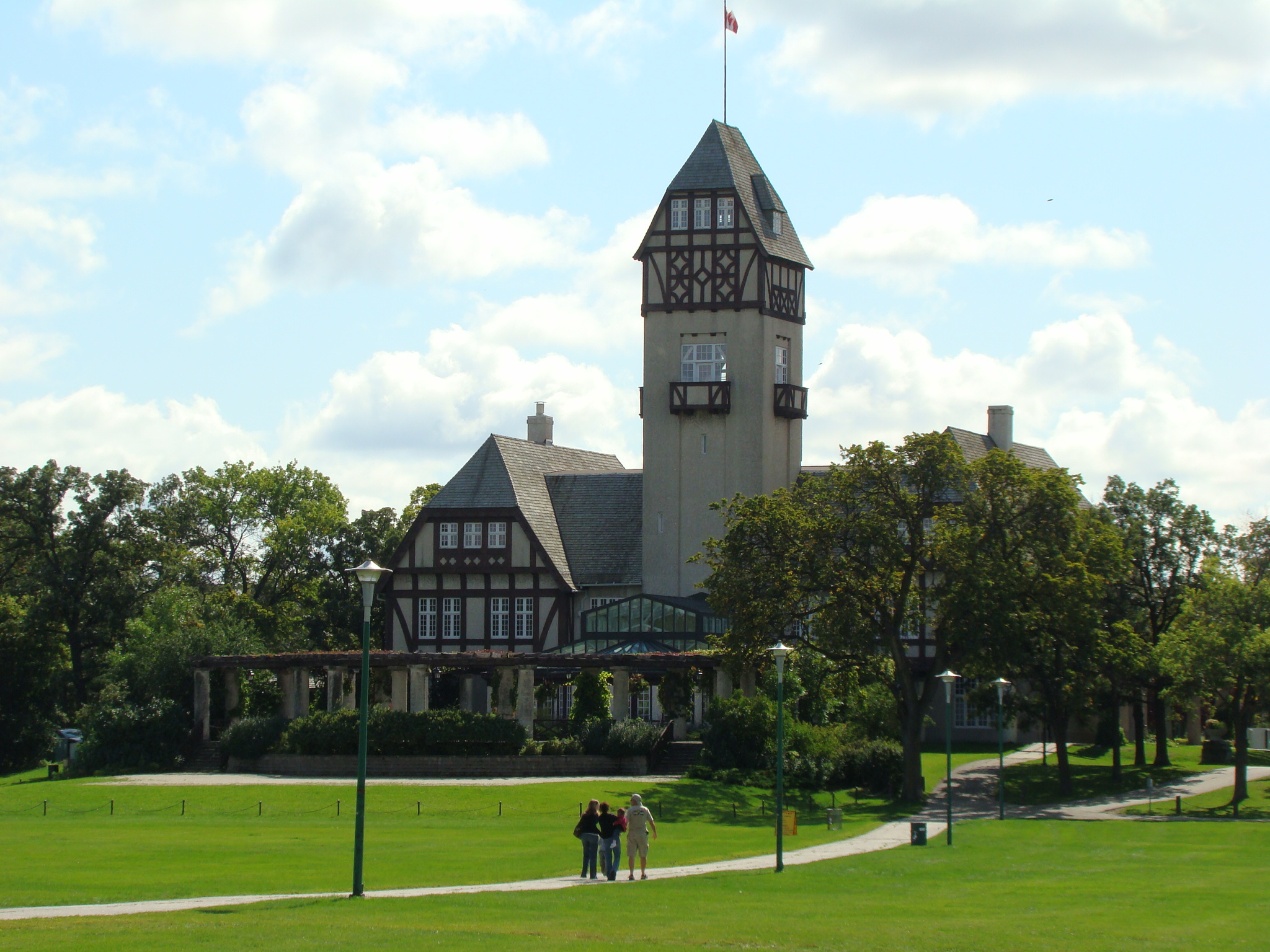
- Assiniboine Park Pavilion
- Interactive map of Assiniboine Park
- Location: 55 Pavilion Crescent; Winnipeg, Manitoba; R3P 2N6
- Coordinates: 49°51′46″N 97°14′40″W
- Area: 1,100 acres (450 ha)
- Created: 1904
- Open: July 7, 1908
- Public transit: Winnipeg Transit; BLUE D19 22 70

Assiniboine Park (formerly known as City Park) is a major urban park in Winnipeg, Manitoba, Canada, located along the Assiniboine River. The park is named for the Assiniboine people.

The Winnipeg Public Parks Board was established in 1893 and acquired the initial land for the park in 1904. Although the grounds were in use earlier, the park officially opened in 1909. Assiniboine Park covers 450 hectares (1,100 acres), of which 160 hectares (400 acres) are designed in the English landscape style.

The park includes 280 hectares (700 acres) of Assiniboine Forest, the Assiniboine Park Zoo, conservatory and garden spaces, the historic Assiniboine Park Pavilion, formal and informal gardens, performance and recreational facilities, and a range of cultural and educational attractions.

== Site ==
Assiniboine Park covers 450 hectares (1,100 acres) in the Tuxedo area of Winnipeg, Manitoba, along the south bank of the Assiniboine River. About 160 hectares (400 acres) of the park is landscaped in the English landscape style, while approximately 280 hectares (690 acres) is occupied by Assiniboine Forest, one of Canada's largest urban nature parks.

The Assiniboine River forms the park's northern edge. A small 2 hectares (4.9 acres) section lies on the north side of the river and is connected to the rest of the park by a pedestrian bridge, providing access from Portage Avenue. Roblin Boulevard borders much of the park to the south.

Within these boundaries, the park contains open lawns, wooded areas, formal gardens, recreational spaces, and the Assiniboine Park Zoo.

== History ==
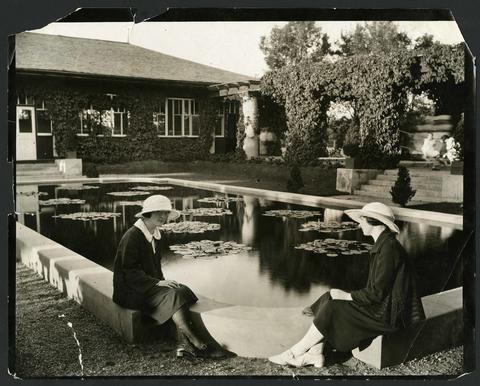
Visitors at the lily pond in the English Garden, c. 1920

In the late 19th century, Winnipeg's rapid growth led civic leaders to advocate for a system of public parks to provide recreation, improve public health, and beautify the city. Following the creation of the Winnipeg Public Parks Board in 1893, the city began acquiring land for new parks. Eleven years later, in 1904, it purchased the land that would become Assiniboine Park, which was planned as a large suburban park for Winnipeg's expanding population.

The park's design reflected the principles of the City Beautiful movement and the English landscape tradition. In 1904, Canadian landscape architect Frederick Gage Todd, a former apprentice and associate of American landscape architect Frederick Law Olmsted, prepared the original plans for the park. Todd's design featured broad open lawns, gently curving roads and pathways, natural groupings of trees and shrubs, and scenic views intended to create the appearance of a natural landscape. Three years later, in 1907, George Champion, Winnipeg's first superintendent of parks, continued developing the park according to those same landscape principles.

Located along the Assiniboine River on what was then the western edge of Winnipeg, Assiniboine Park was intended as a rural retreat where residents could escape the city while remaining within easy reach. Early descriptions promoted it as "the favourite resort of the wearied citizen," offering opportunities for picnicking, boating, bathing, scenic drives, and other outdoor recreation.

== Conservatory and gardens ==
There is evidence that Henry Sandham Griffith designed a landscape layout for the park in April 1894.

=== Conservatory ===
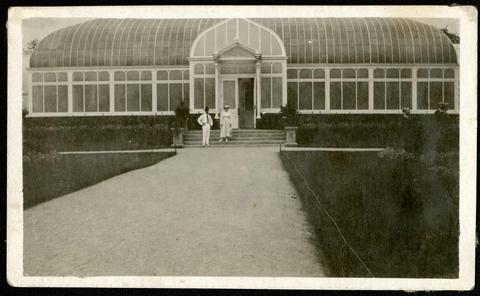
Visitors outside the Assiniboine Park Conservatory, c. 1924.

One of the park's earliest attractions, the Assiniboine Park Conservatory housed more than 8,000 flowers, plants and trees that were not native to Manitoba, but which grew under the controlled conditions of its Palm House and seasonal display garden.

The original Palm House was erected in 1914. In 1968, a modern conservatory building was constructed over and around the Palm House, enclosing the historic structure while expanding the indoor gardens.

The conservatory closed permanently in April 2018 after reaching the end of its useful life and was subsequently demolished. It was replaced by The Leaf, which opened in 2022 as the centrepiece of the Gardens at The Leaf redevelopment. The new facility contains four climate-controlled biomes showcasing tropical and Mediterranean plants, seasonal floral displays, and related horticultural attractions.

=== English Garden ===
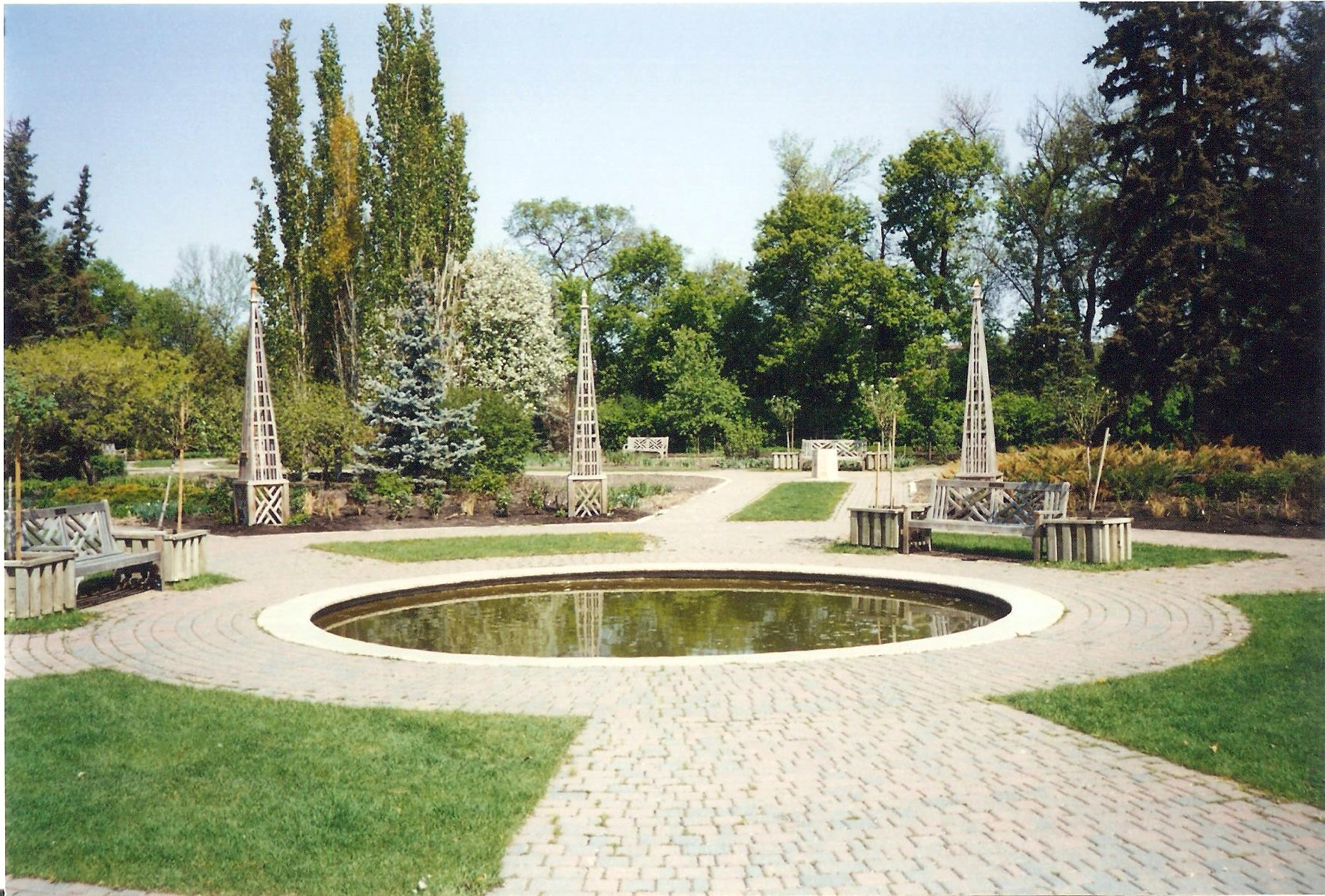
The central pond in the English Garden, 2003.

The English Garden was established between 1926 and 1927 as one of Assiniboine Park's principal horticultural attractions. Covering nearly 3 acres (1.2 ha), it features thousands of annual and perennial flowers, shrubs and trees arranged in the traditional English garden style. Winding paths lead through formal flower beds, landscaped borders and mature trees, with a circular ornamental fountain at the garden's centre.

From the outset, the English Garden was intended to serve as both a public display garden and an educational resource, demonstrating ornamental plants that could be successfully cultivated in Manitoba's prairie climate. More than a century after it was established, seasonal floral displays continue to be replanted each spring, creating a changing landscape throughout the growing season.

The garden also continues to serve its original educational purpose. Each year, staff evaluate new annual and perennial varieties under Winnipeg's growing conditions before recommending them for wider use in public landscapes. These plant trials help identify ornamental plants that are well suited to Manitoba's climate.

=== Formal garden ===
The Formal Garden, located at the southeast park entrance, was designed in 1907 by Frederick Todd as part of the original park. It features flower beds in sharply defined geometric shapes that stand out from the grassy areas. Each of the beds, as well as the overall design, is symmetrical.

=== Leo Mol Sculpture Garden ===
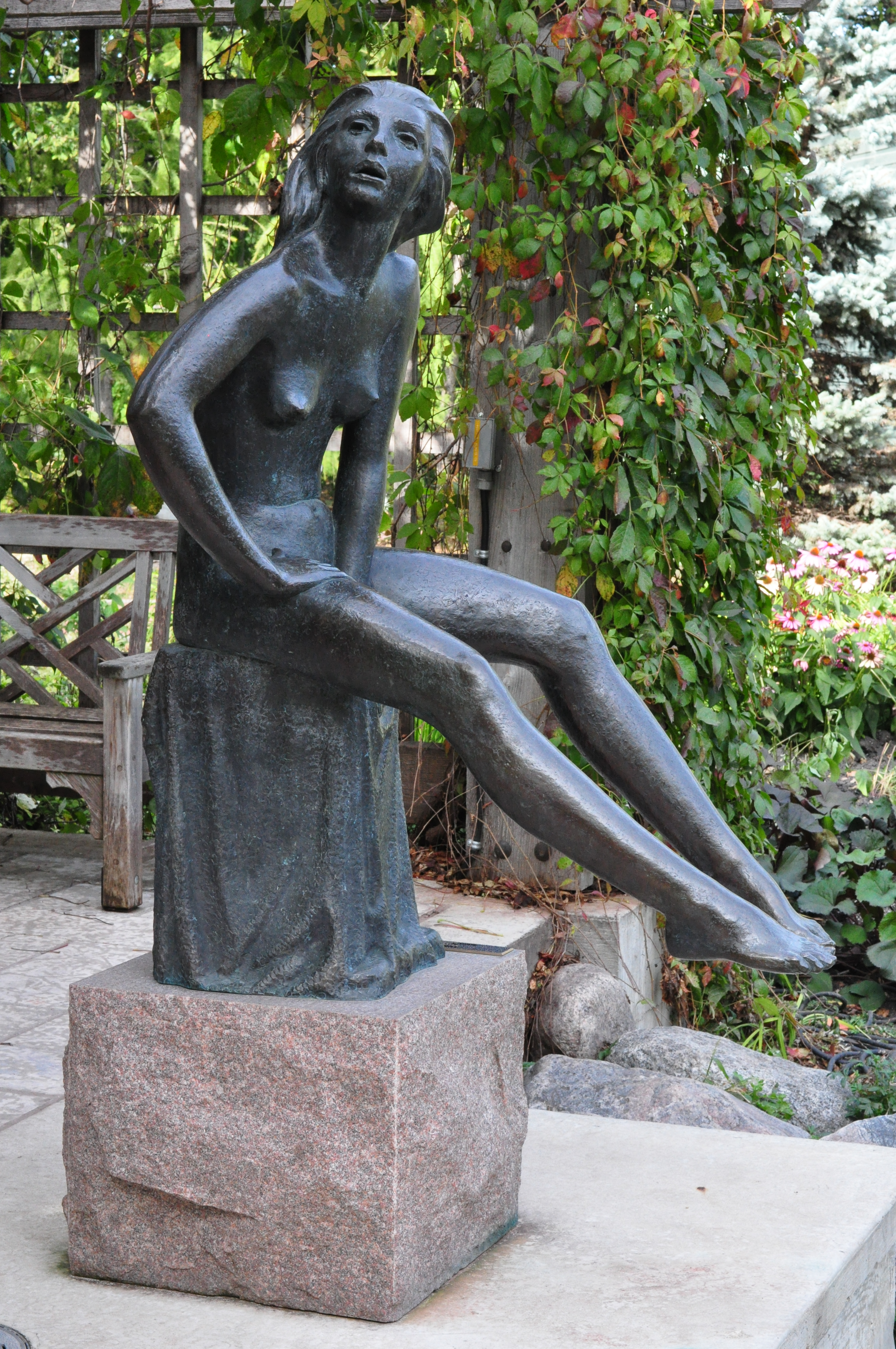
Bronze sculpture of a seated nude girl by Leo Mol in the Leo Mol Sculpture Garden

The Leo Mol Sculpture Garden opened in Assiniboine Park on June 18, 1992, following the donation of a major collection by Ukrainian Canadian sculptor Leo Mol. In 1990, Mol donated more than 300 bronze sculptures, terracottas, paintings and drawings to the City of Winnipeg, providing the basis for the garden's collection. In 1991, the Winnipeg Foundation contributed $50,000 toward the garden's creation.

Located near the Pavilion and adjacent to the park's English Garden, the sculpture garden was developed in phases by landscape architects Garry Hilderman, Heather Cram and Natasa Juck of Winnipeg-based HTFC Planning & Design, working in collaboration with Mol and the City of Winnipeg. Its design places Mol's sculptures among flowers, shrubs, walkways and seating areas. In 1994, the landscape architects received a Regional Merit Award from the Canadian Society of Landscape Architects for their work on the garden.

The garden also contains the Leo Mol Gallery and the Leo Mol Schoolhouse Studio. Mol had purchased the former Corona School District No. 1706 schoolhouse in the 1960s and used it as a studio during the 1970s and 1980s. The building was moved from Birds Hill to the sculpture garden in 1995 and restored. Its interior retains moulds and plaster casts associated with Mol's major works, illustrating stages in the creation of a bronze sculpture.

The sculpture garden has been expanded twice since its opening to accommodate further works by Mol. Its indoor and outdoor displays include bronze and ceramic sculptures, paintings and drawings, while the subjects of Mol's sculptures include human figures, portraits, animals and figures drawn from mythology. The garden is open throughout the year.

== Prominent attractions ==
This large park hosts several attractions.

=== Pavilion and theatre ===
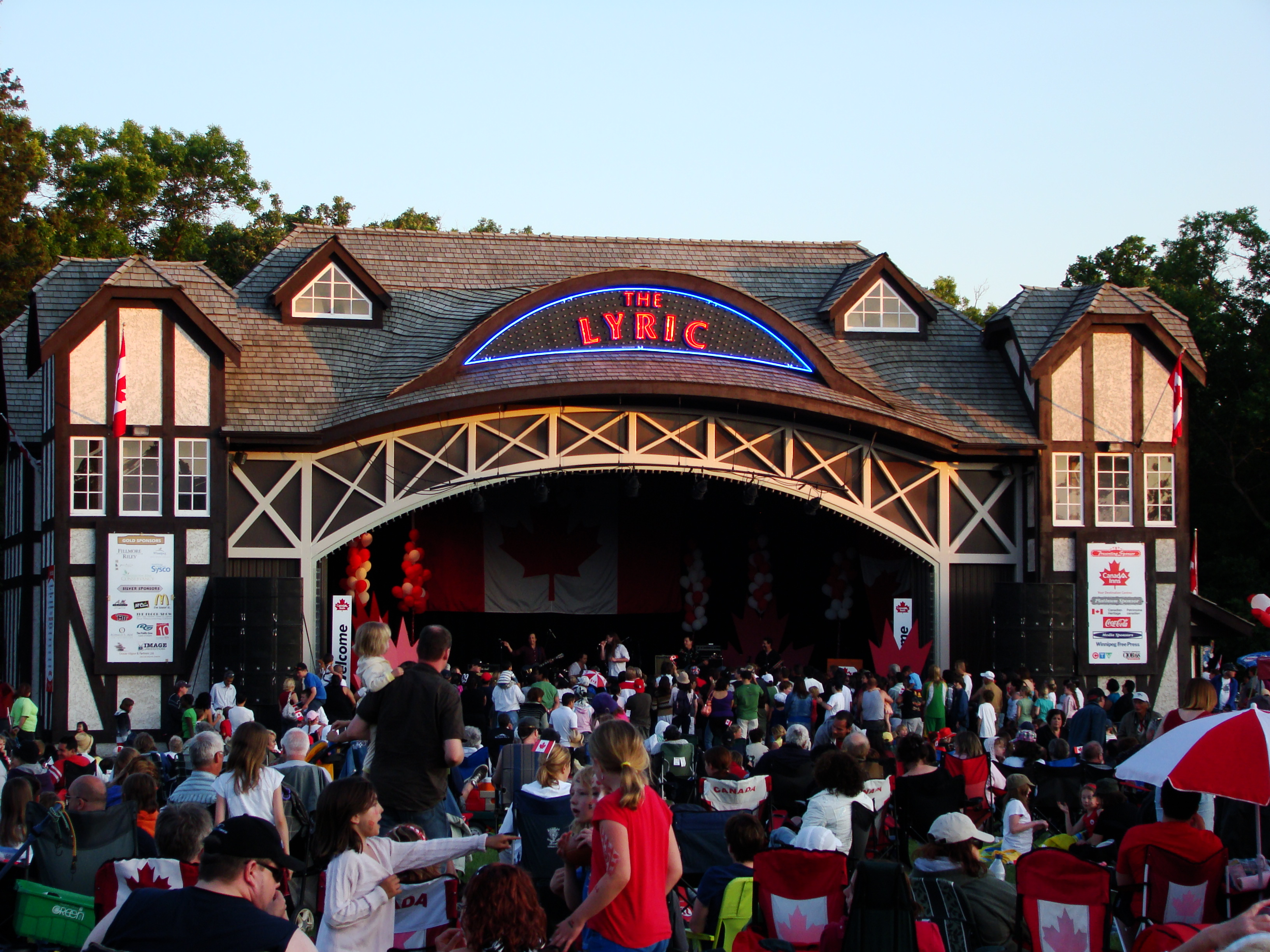
The Lyric Theatre on Canada Day

The park's signature feature, the Assiniboine Park Pavilion, was an early centre of Winnipeg's social life. Originally designed by John D. Atchison and completed in 1908, the pavilion included a dance hall, banquet hall, and lunch and catering facilities. A 27-metre (90-foot) tower housed the pump and water tower for the park's water system.

The original pavilion was destroyed by fire in May 1929. The present, larger pavilion was designed by architects Northwood and Chivers and opened in May 1930. It remains one of Winnipeg's most recognizable landmarks.

The Lyric Theatre is a large outdoor stage located next to the Pavilion. Opened in 1999, it carries on the tradition of bandshell entertainment near the Pavilion that started in the 1920s.

=== Zoo ===
The 90 acres (36 ha) Assiniboine Park Zoo is at the western end of the park just north of the main parking area, and is home to over 300 animal species. It initially opened in July 1908.

=== Foot bridge ===
The first footbridge across the Assiniboine River was built in 1908, shortly after Assiniboine Park opened. As park use increased, the bridge was later considered too narrow to safely accommodate pedestrian traffic.

A second footbridge was constructed to connect the St. James district at Overdale Street with Assiniboine Park. The pedestrian and active transportation bridge opened in May 1932 and was officially inaugurated by Winnipeg mayor Ralph Webb.

A small portion of the park, measuring 2 hectares (5 acres), lies north of the Assiniboine River. Together with the footbridge, this area provides pedestrian access to the main park grounds from Portage Avenue.

=== Children's Nature and Adventure Playground ===
Opened in May 2011 as part of the Park's redevelopment, a 0.81 ha (2-acre) Children's Nature and Adventure Playground was built as a children's play area. It is located adjacent to the Pavilion and cost $6 million. The play area features a kid-size doorway, although adult throughway is also provided.

=== Railway ===
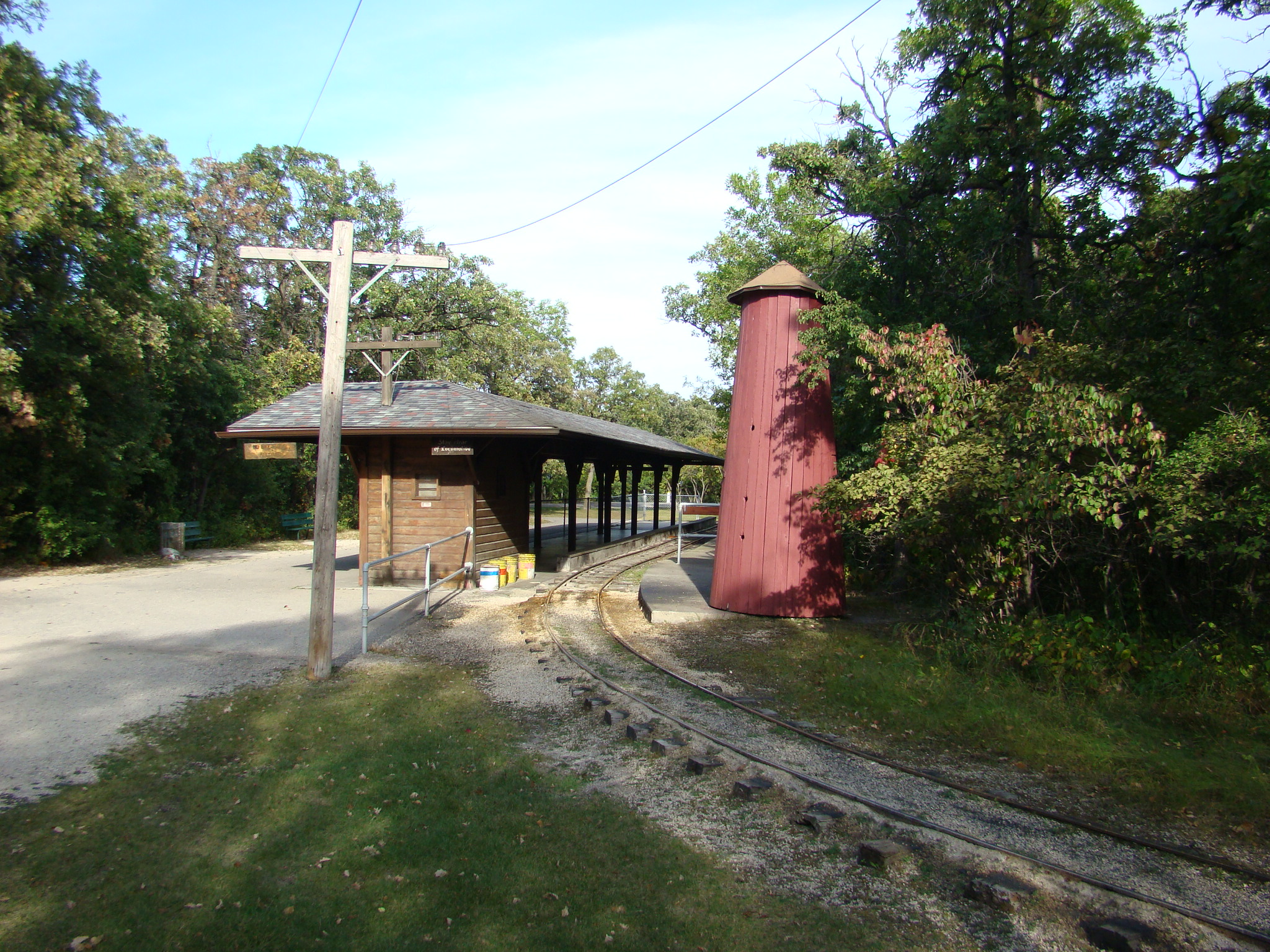
Train Station in Assiniboine Park

Assiniboine Park contains both a preserved steam locomotive and a working miniature railway. Adjacent to Roblin Boulevard, Canadian National Railway No. 6043, a CN U-1-d "Mountain" 4-8-2 steam locomotive, is on permanent display on loan from the Winnipeg Railway Museum. Built in 1944, it was the last steam locomotive to operate scheduled service in Canada before being retired in 1960. In 1983, the locomotive was designated a municipal heritage resource.

The park also contains the Assiniboine Park Railroad, a 2 ft (610 mm) narrow-gauge railway that operates through part of the park using a working steam locomotive built by Crown Metal Products.

=== Duck pond ===
The Riley Family Duck Pond is a landscaped water feature located near the northern end of Assiniboine Park beside the pedestrian footbridge from Portage Avenue. It serves as a year-round recreational area within the park.

The original duck pond was enclosed by fencing for much of its history. Between 2007 and 2010, it was redeveloped as part of the park's renewal, more than doubling in size. The redesigned pond features a naturalized shoreline, small islands, a pedestrian bridge, aquatic plantings, seating areas and improved pathways, with shoreline access for seasonal activities including canoeing and skating.

In June 2012, Winnipeg philanthropists J. Derek Riley and H. Sanford "Sandy" Riley donated $1.5 million toward the redevelopment in honour of their grandfather, Robert T. Riley, after whom the site was renamed the Riley Family Duck Pond.

A nearby pavilion, originally built in 1967 as a skating change facility and picnic shelter, was extensively renovated during the redevelopment. Approximately 75 percent of the original structure was retained while creating a larger, brighter and fully accessible public facility.

== Public art and monuments ==
Assiniboine Park contains public artworks, commemorative monuments and historic architectural features throughout its grounds.

One of the park's best-known works is a bronze sculpture of Harry Colebourn and Winnie the Bear. It commemorates the Canadian Army Veterinary Corps officer whose pet black bear, named after Winnipeg, later inspired A. A. Milne's fictional character Winnie-the-Pooh. The sculpture was unveiled at the Assiniboine Park Zoo in 1992 and moved to the Nature Playground in 2010.

The park also contains the Boy with the Boot, a fountain sculpture first displayed outside Winnipeg City Hall in 1898. It was removed from City Hall in 1913 and later placed near the duck pond before being installed at the entrance to the English Garden in 1953. The statue was added to the city's List of Historical Resources on July 4, 2024.

Near the intersection of Corydon Avenue and Conservatory Drive stands the Red River Ox Cart, a sculpture by Roman Ivan Kowal measuring approximately one and a half times life size. Presented to Winnipeg in November 1974, it depicts the Red River cart that served as a common form of land transportation in Western Canada during the 19th century.

The park also features the Winnipeg Citizens Hall of Fame, established by the Winnipeg Real Estate Board in 1986. Bronze portrait busts of its inductees are displayed together in Assiniboine Park.

Near the pedestrian footbridge, Gordon Reeve's Agassiz Ice consists of three stainless-steel sculptures inspired by the icebergs of glacial Lake Agassiz. The Nature Playground also contains DO RE MI FA SOL LA SI by Joe Fafard, which combines scenes, objects and fragments into the forms of seven running horses. The sculpture was installed in the Streuber Family Children's Garden in 2024.

== Sports ==
Assiniboine Park contains baseball diamonds, athletic fields, soccer pitches, cricket facilities, playgrounds, bicycle paths, and a clubhouse.

The park's Princess Auto Cricket Field includes two cricket pitches. The facility reopened in June 2026 following a major redevelopment, the first substantial upgrade to the cricket grounds since improvements made for the 1967 Pan American Games.

The Terry Fox Fitness Trail runs through the park's southeast corner and features outdoor exercise equipment with instructional signage.

== Assiniboine Park Riparian Forest Project ==
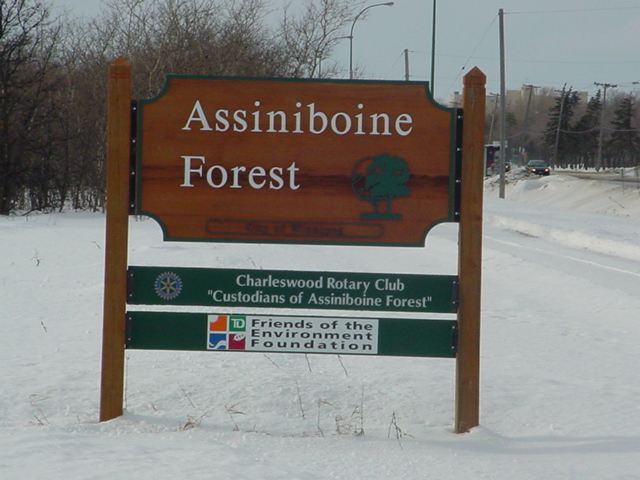
Assiniboine Forest

The Assiniboine Park Riparian Forest Project purposes to help the riparian forest recover from heavy use and enhance the recreational trail experience. The ongoing riverbank restoration project, begun in 2006, continues each summer.

The project concerns the strip of forest along the Assiniboine River within Assiniboine Park, a well-known and much-loved recreational area just east of the footbridge on the south side of Portage Avenue. Over many years, the forest has suffered a loss of vegetation due to flooding, invasive plant species that replace native species, and trampling from recreational activities such as hiking and biking. Generations of heavy usage has resulted in the creation of an extensive trail network, soil compaction and large areas of bare ground.

Restoration is underway in the forest through city planning, cooperation from trail-users and efforts such as tree planting, invasive species removal and creating a main trail. The project's aim is that by reducing the impact of recreation in the forest, this natural area will still be around for generations to visit 100 years from now.

== Gallery ==
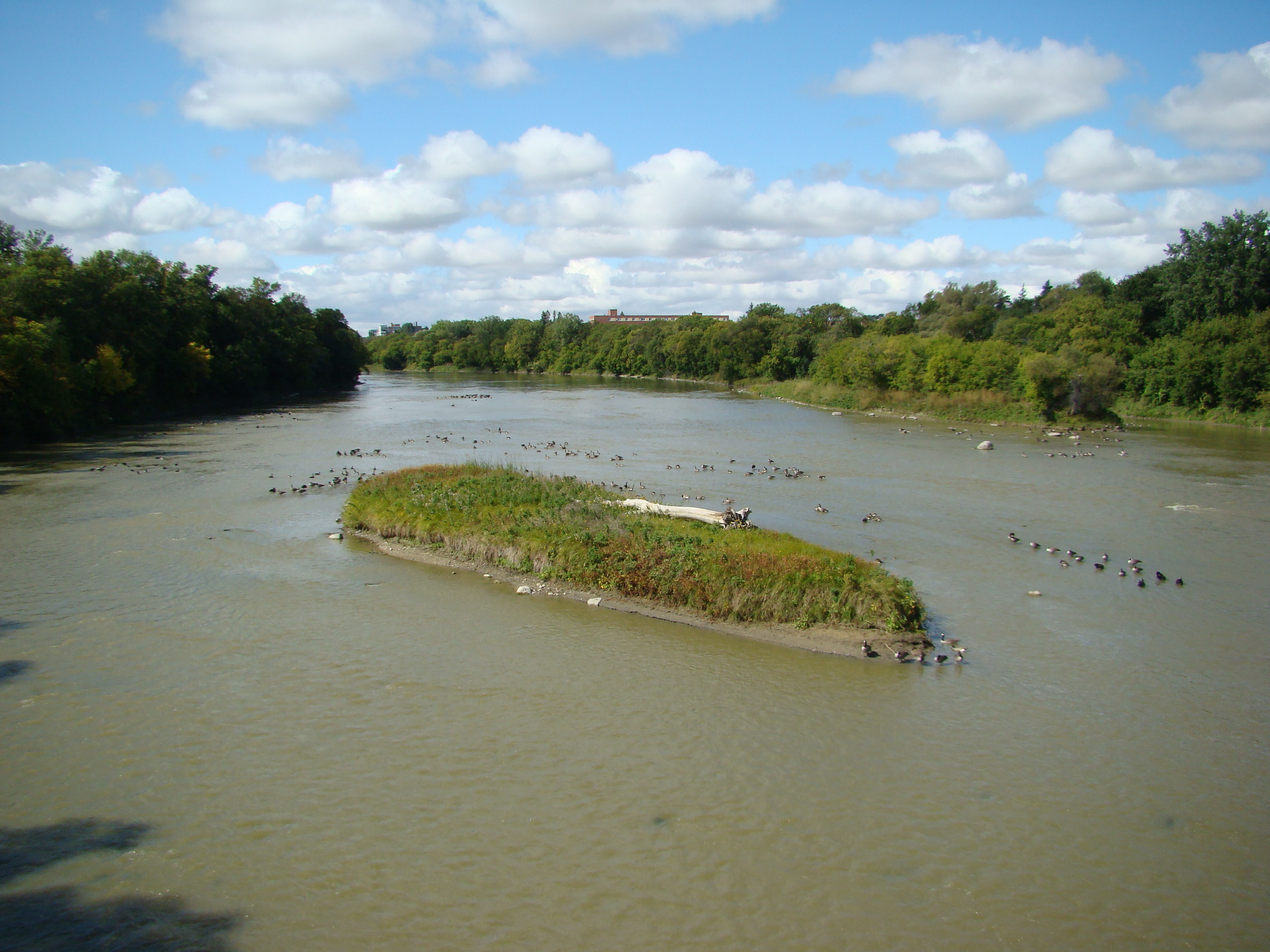
Assiniboine River

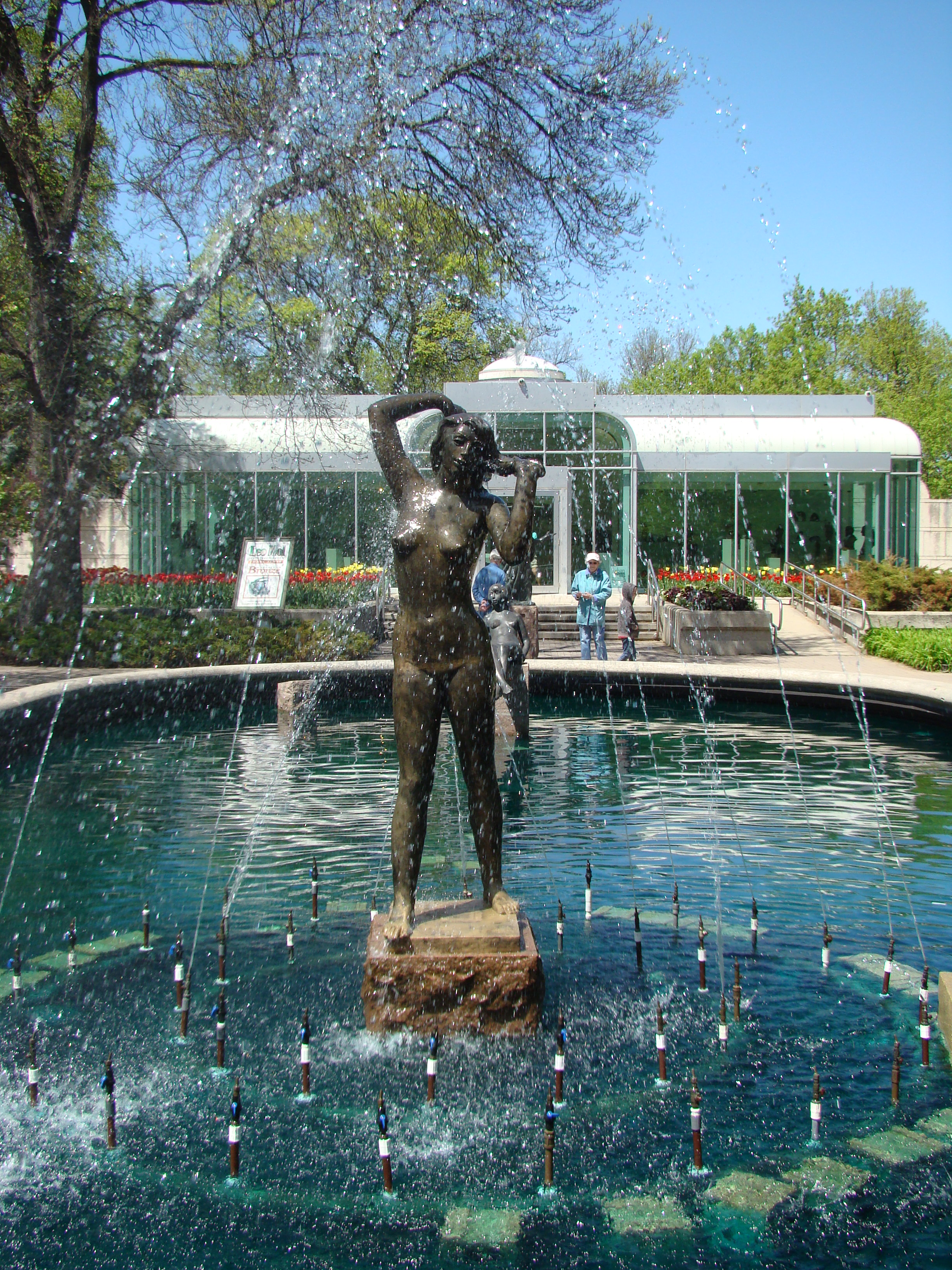
Leo Mol Sculpture Garden in Assiniboine Park

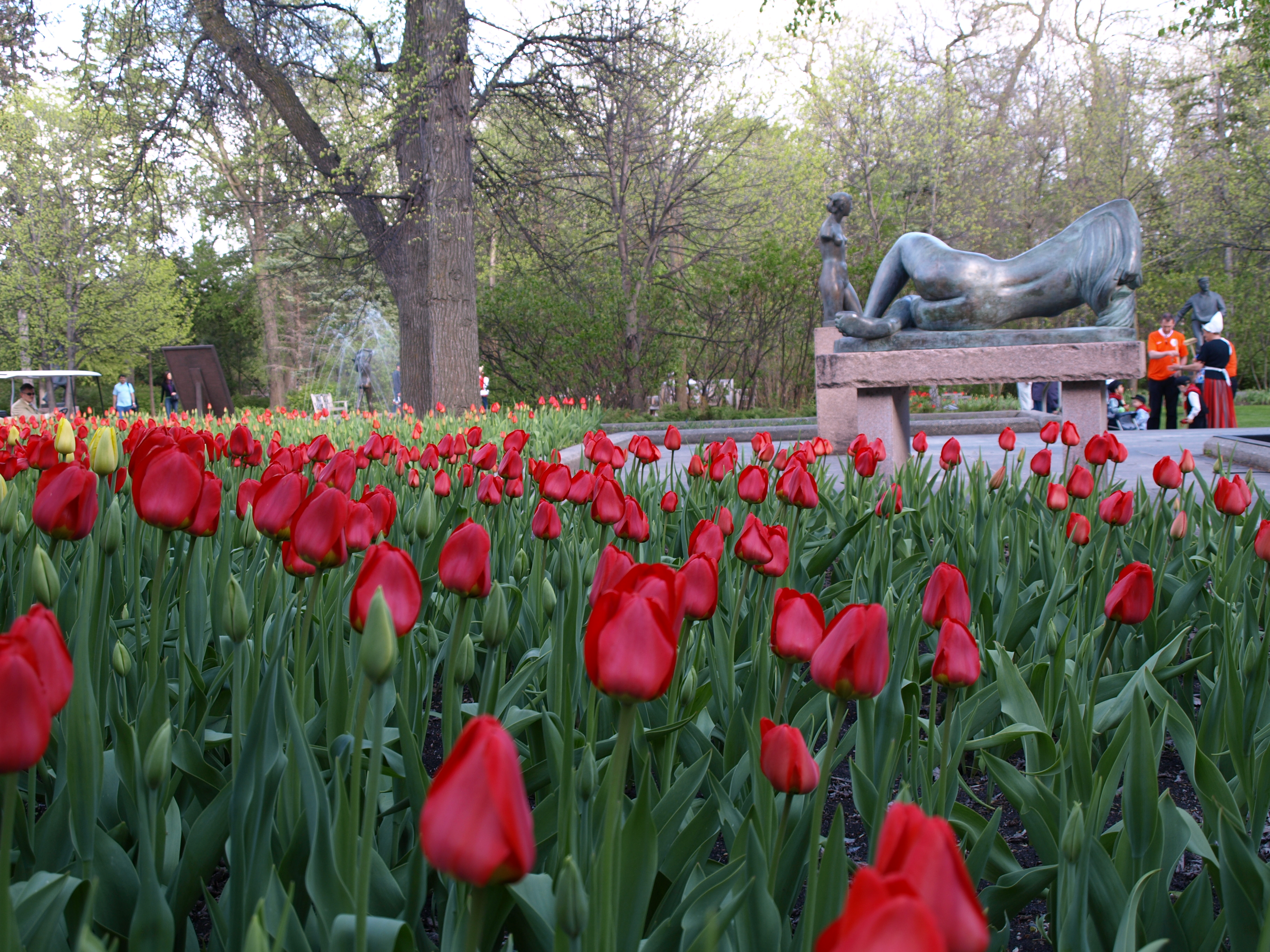
Tulip Festival 2009 in Sculpture Garden, Assiniboine Park

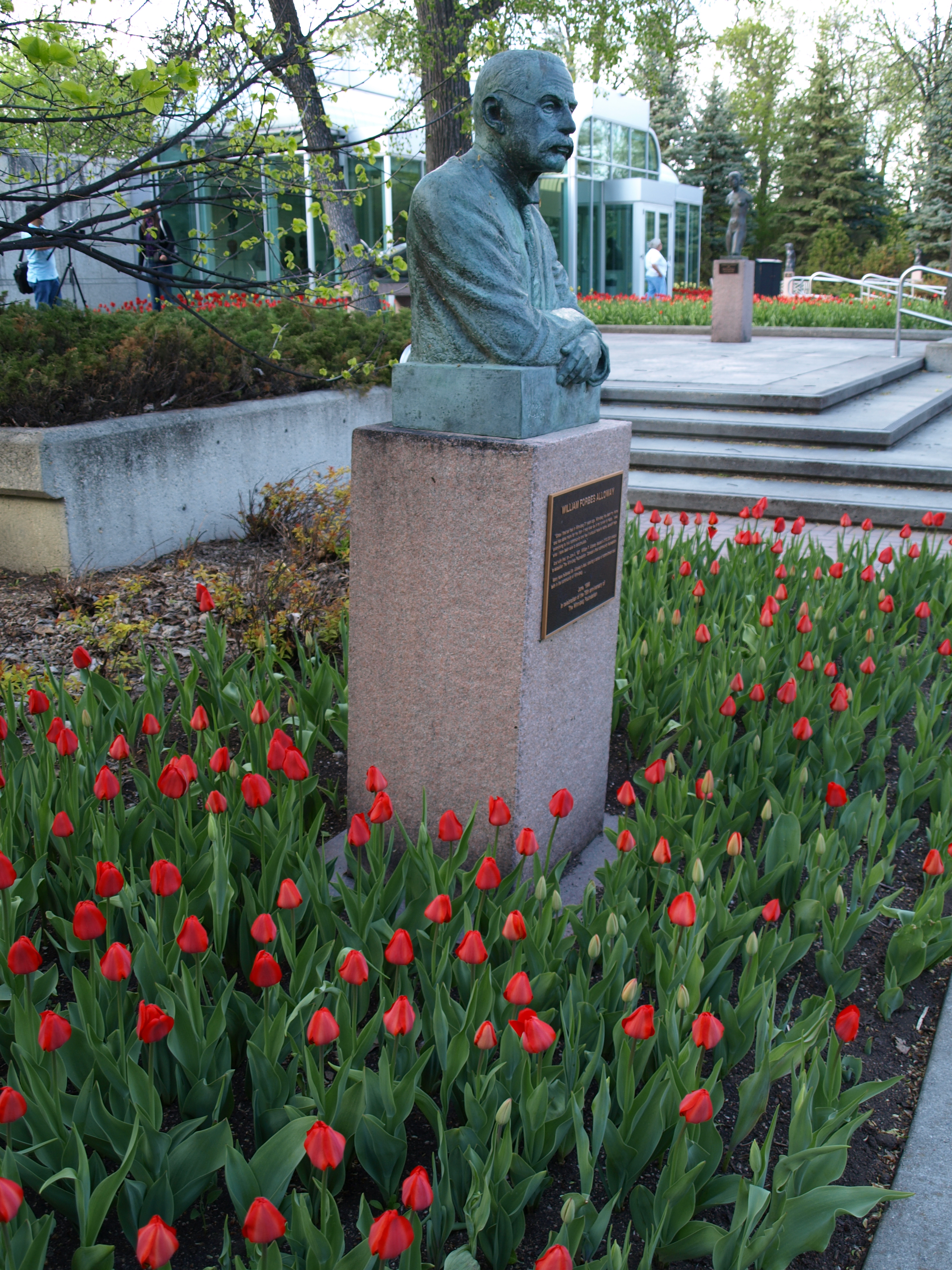
Leo Mol Sculpture Garden in Assiniboine Park

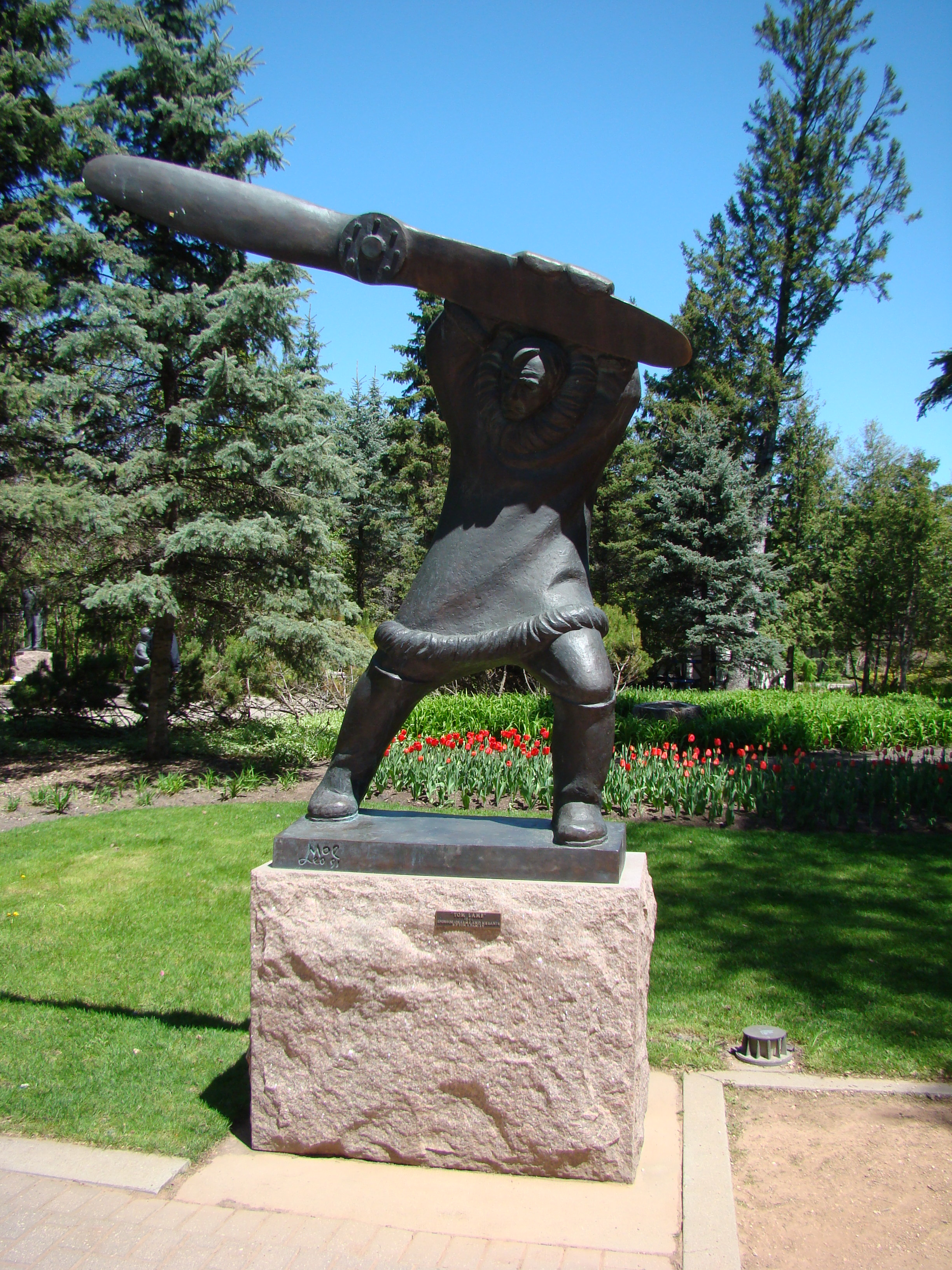
Leo Mol Sculpture Garden in Assiniboine Park

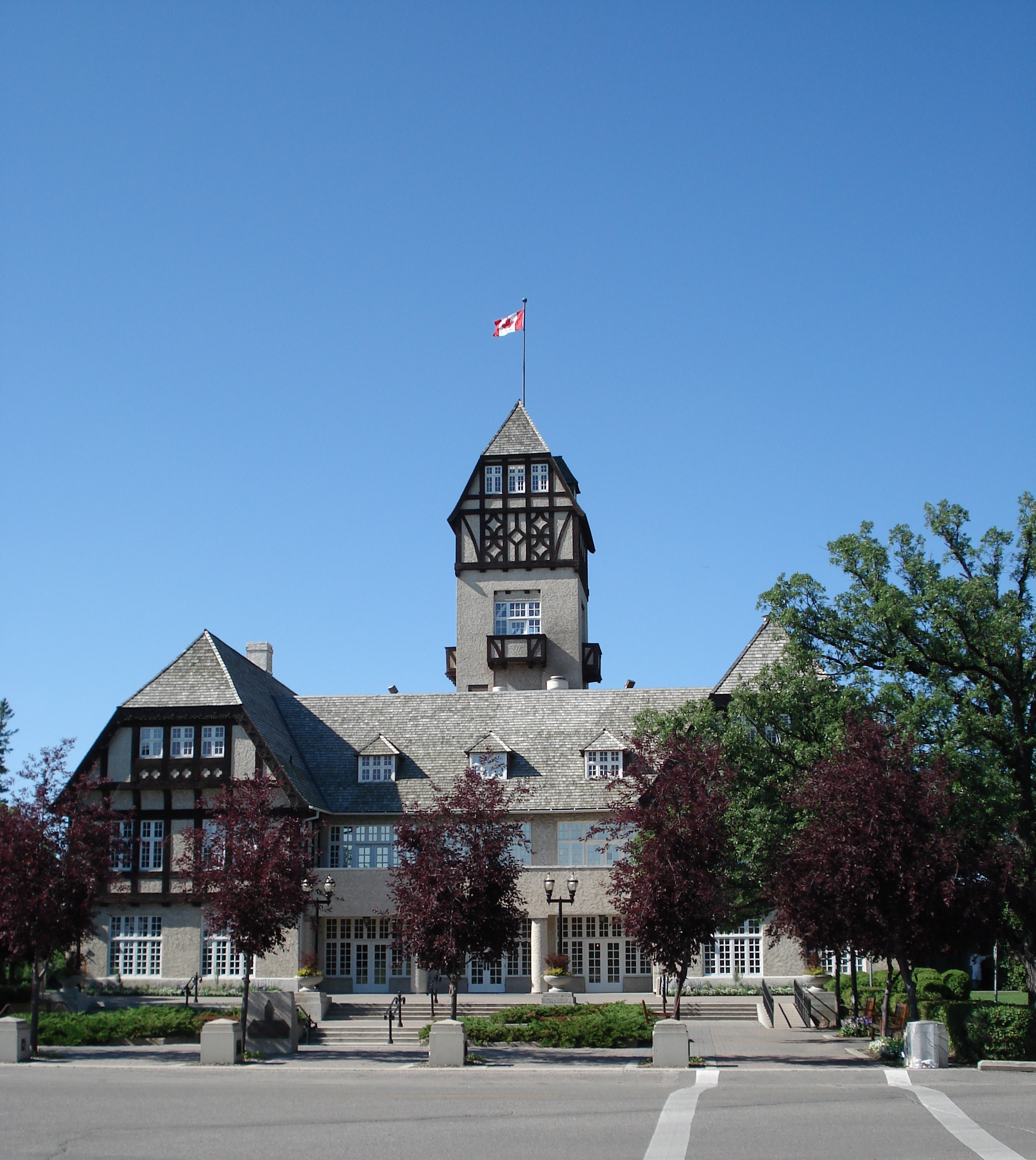
The Assiniboine Park Pavilion as seen from the south.

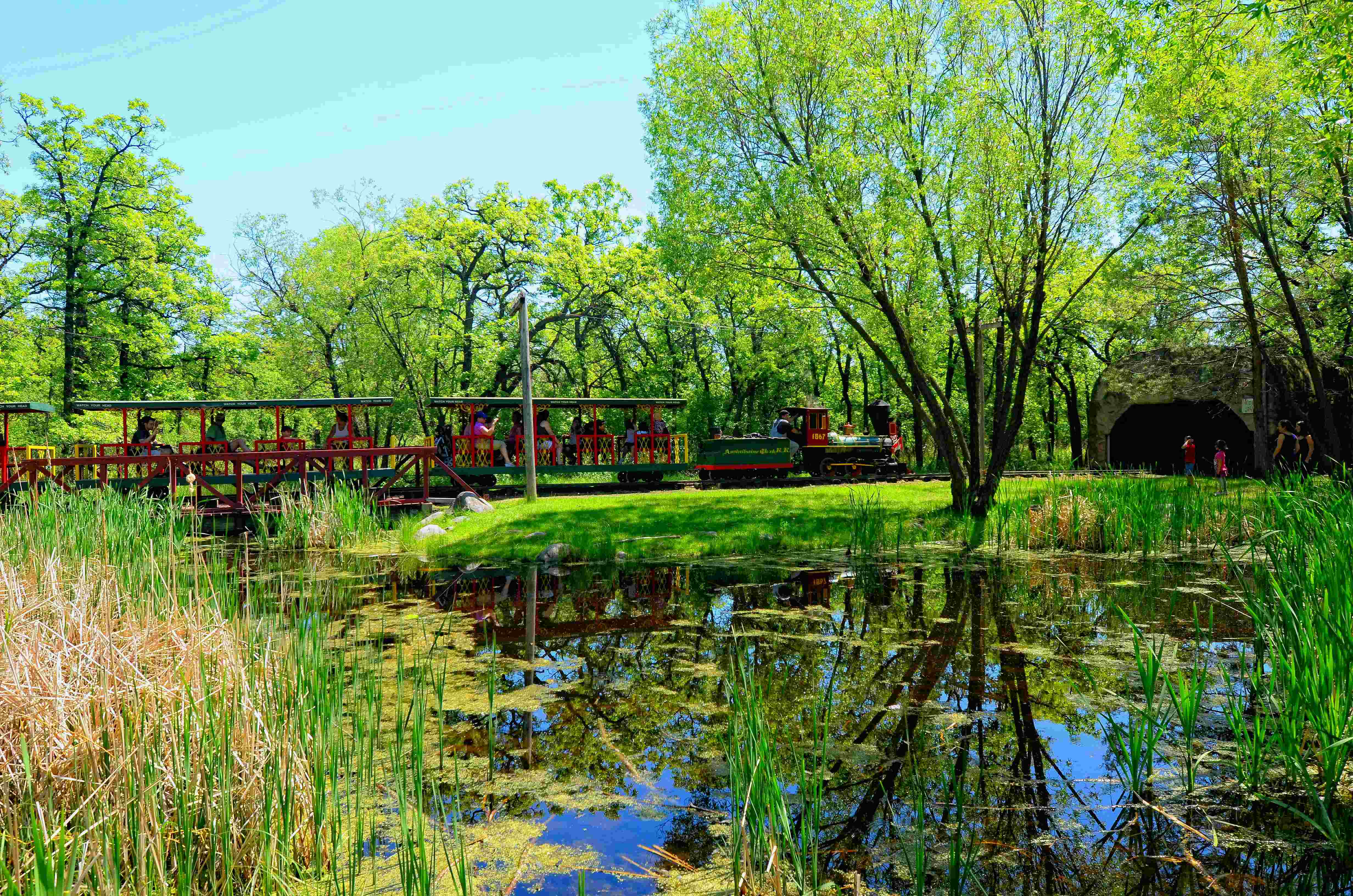
Assiniboine Park miniature train

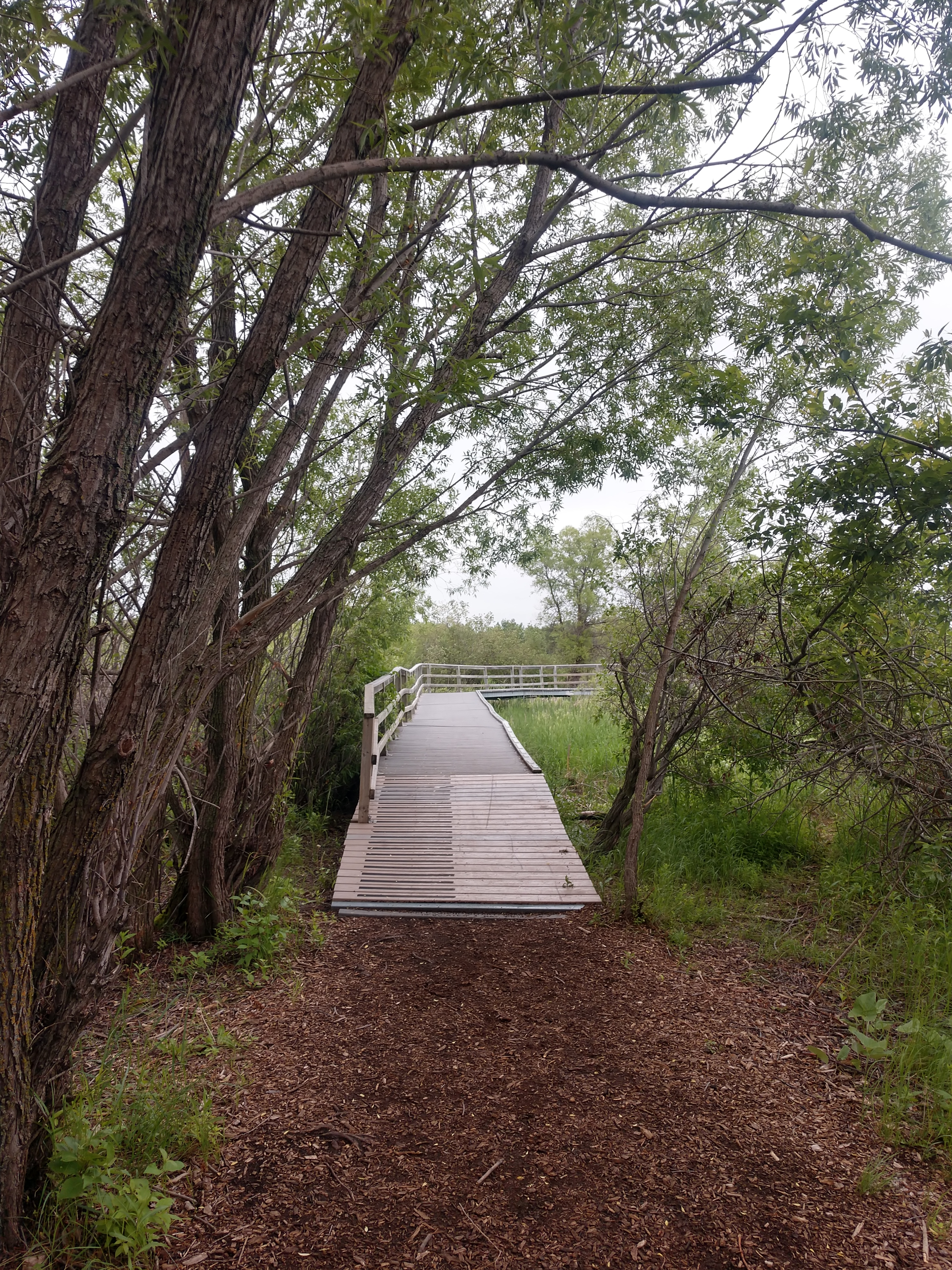
Bridge on a hiking trail in Assiniboine Park

== See also ==
- List of botanical gardens in Canada
- Winnipeg arts and culture
