= Leaf (disambiguation) =

A leaf is an organ of a vascular plant.

Leaf or Leaves may also refer to:

== Places ==
- Leaf, Georgia, United States, an unincorporated community
- Leaf, Mississippi, United States, an unincorporated community
- Leaf River (disambiguation), several rivers in North America

== People ==
- Leaf (surname), a list of people with the family name Leaf or Leafe
- Leaf Daniell (1877–1913), British fencer, silver medalist in the 1908 Olympics
- Leaf Huang, Taiwanese-born American biophysicist
- Pine Leaf, possibly the same person as Woman Chief, a female chief of the Crow tribe

== Arts, entertainment, and media ==
- Leaf (Dutch band), a pop band formed in 2005
- Leaves (Icelandic band), a five-piece alternative rock band formed in 2001
- "Leaves" (Spaced), a television episode
- The Leaves, a 1960s American garage band
- A Leaf, a classical piece written by Paul McCartney, with assistance from John Fraser
- The Leaf Label, an independent record label based in Leeds, United Kingdom
- "Leaves", a children's story from The Railway Series book Gordon the Big Engine by the Reverend Wilbert Awdry
- Leaves, a devotional magazine published by the Missionary Order of Mariannhill in the United States

== Brands and enterprises ==
- Leaf (Israeli company), a photography company
- Leaf (Japanese company), a visual novel studio
- Leaf (payment platform)
- Leading Edge Air Foils, also called "LEAF", an American aircraft parts supplier
- Leaf Books, a small Wales-based publisher
- Leaf Brands, an American candy company
- Leaf International, a Dutch-Swedish confectionery company
- Nissan Leaf, an electric car

== Material ==
- Leaf (books), half of a sheet, the sheet’s center being bound at the spine, such that each half may have a page on either or both sides
- Metal leaf, a thin metal foil, e.g.:
  - Gold leaf

== Science, engineering and technology ==
- Leaf, in foliation mathematics
- Large European Acoustic Facility, a sound facility operated by the European Space Agency
- Law Enforcement Access Field, as used in the Clipper chip encryption device
- Leaf node, part of a tree data structure in computer science
- Leaf object, an object represented by an end node in a tree structure
- LEAF Project, a collection of Linux distributions dedicated to routing
- Leaf spring, a common type of vehicle suspension
- LEAF Consortium is an association of partner entities intent on bringing interoperability to the Access Control and Identity Credentials market and beyond.

== Other uses ==
- LEAF Community Arts (LEAF), an arts organization and festival in Black Mountain, North Carolina
- Leaf-class tanker, a class of support tanker of the British Royal Fleet Auxiliary
- Women's Legal Education and Action Fund, a Canadian women's legal advocacy group
- Life Extension Advocacy Foundation, a non-profit organization supporting anti-aging research
- A nickname for a Canadian person

== See also ==
- Leave (disambiguation)
- Leef (disambiguation)
- Leif (disambiguation)
- Leafy (disambiguation)
- Leefe Robinson (1895-1918), British First World War pilot awarded the Victoria Cross
- Leaf by Niggle, a short story by J. R. R. Tolkien
