= Leo Mol =

Canadian artist

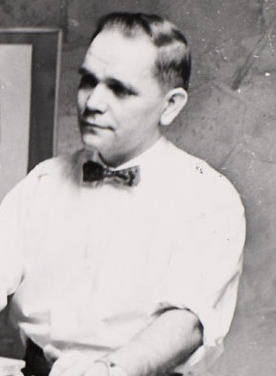
- Born: Leonid Molodozhanyn; January 15, 1915; Polonne, Russian Empire (now Ukraine)
- Died: July 4, 2009 (aged 94); Winnipeg, Manitoba, Canada
- Education: Leningrad Academy of Arts
- Known for: Sculptor, Painter, stained glass artist

Leonid Molodozhanyn OC OM RCA (January 15, 1915 – July 4, 2009), known as Leo Mol, was a Russian-born- Ukrainian Canadian stained glass artist, painter and sculptor.

== Early life ==
There are two distinct versions of Leo Mol's biography. One of them states that he was the only child and studied sculpture in Vienna from the age of 15. Another version states that he studied at the Leningrad Academy of Arts under Matvey Manizer. The first version, likely fabricated by Leo Mol himself in order to protect his family members back in the USSR, was disproven when Mol met his sister Nina in Siberia on the brink of the collapse of the Soviet Union.

Born Leonid Molodozhanyn in Polonne, Russian Empire (now Ukraine). Polonne was rich in good clay and its inhabitants were a community of potters. Mol's father, Hryhorii, came from a long line of potters.

== Education ==
Leonid Molodozhanyn received a grade five education in Nalchik. The Soviet approach to education and training around 1925, when Leonid was ten, demanded that youth from the grade five or six level cease school and move into a trade. Mol learned the art of ceramics in his father's pottery workshop. Mol studied sculpture at the Leningrad Academy of Arts from 1936 to 1940.

== Career ==
In Leningrad, Molodozhanyn's first commission, in 1939, was a sculpture of composer Alexander Borodin, which still stands in the St. Petersburg Conservatory.

Following the German invasion of the Soviet Union he was deported to Germany where he was influenced by Arno Breker. In 1945, he moved to The Hague, and in December, 1948, he and his wife, Margareth (whom he married in 1943), emigrated to Winnipeg, Manitoba. In 1949, he held his first ceramics exhibition in Winnipeg.

== Leo Mol Sculpture Garden ==
More than three hundred of Mol's works are displayed in the 1.2 hectare Leo Mol Sculpture Garden in Winnipeg's Assiniboine Park which comprises a gallery, a renovated studio, and an outdoor display. The garden was unveiled on June 18, 1992 and has been expanded twice since. It is supported by private donations, and Mol personally donated 200 bronze sculptures to the city of Winnipeg. The sculptures are of religious leaders, prominent people, the human form, and wildlife.

== Death ==
Mol died July 4, 2009, at St. Boniface Hospital in Winnipeg, Manitoba. He was 94.

== Works ==
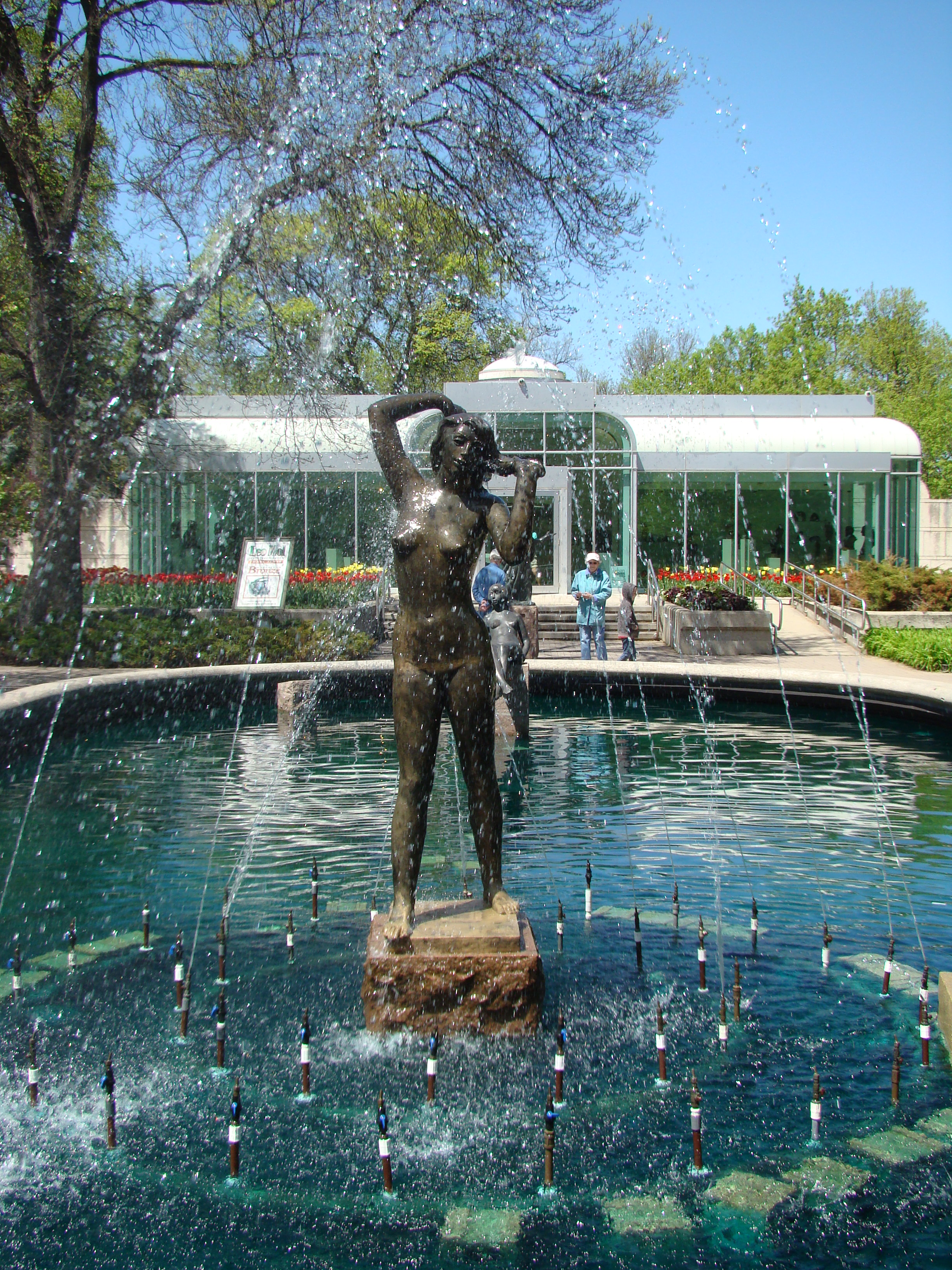
Leo Mol Sculpture Garden in Assiniboine Park Winnipeg

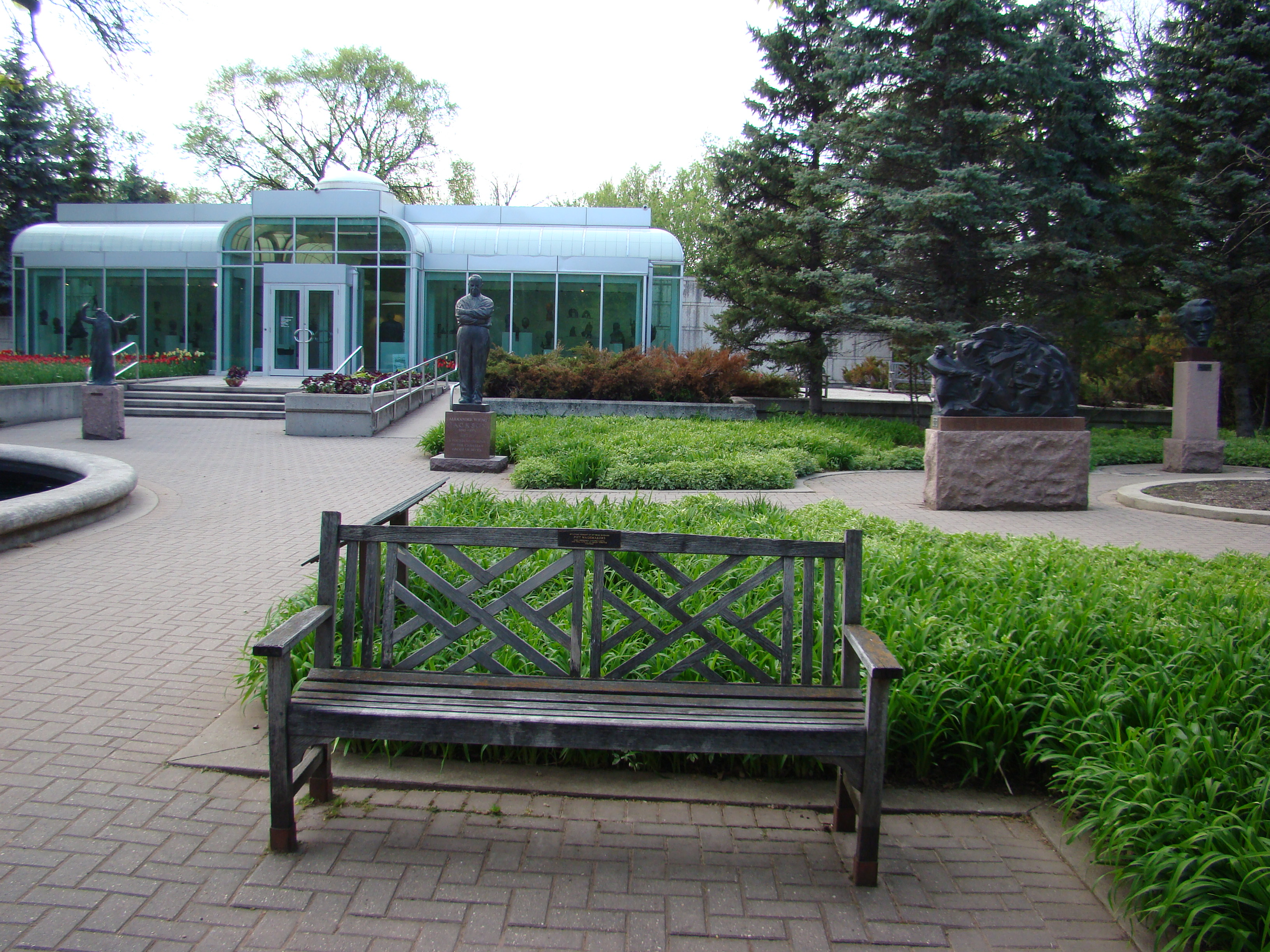
Leo Mol Sculpture Garden in Assiniboine Park Winnipeg

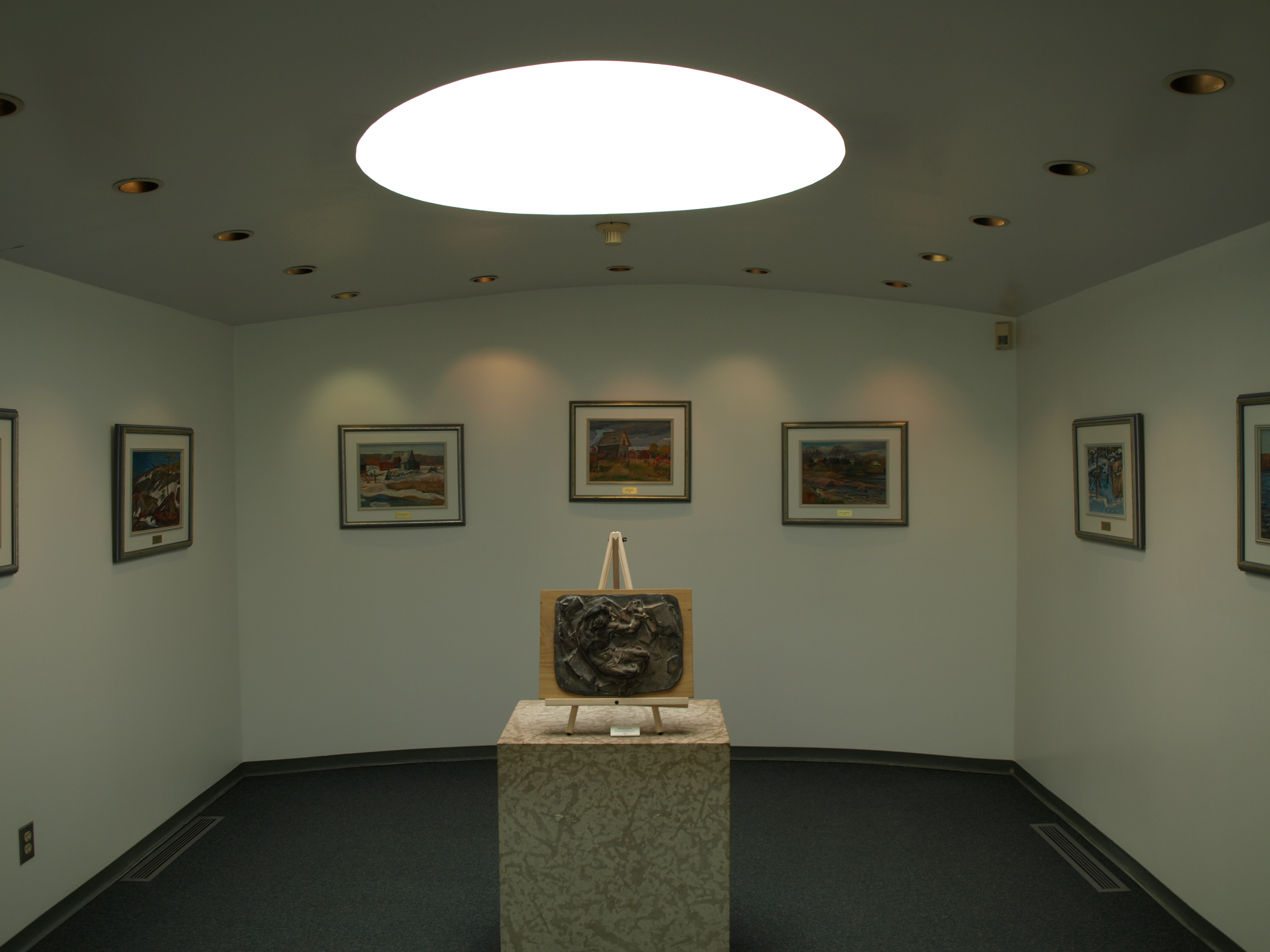
Leo Mol Sculpture Garden in Assiniboine Park Winnipeg

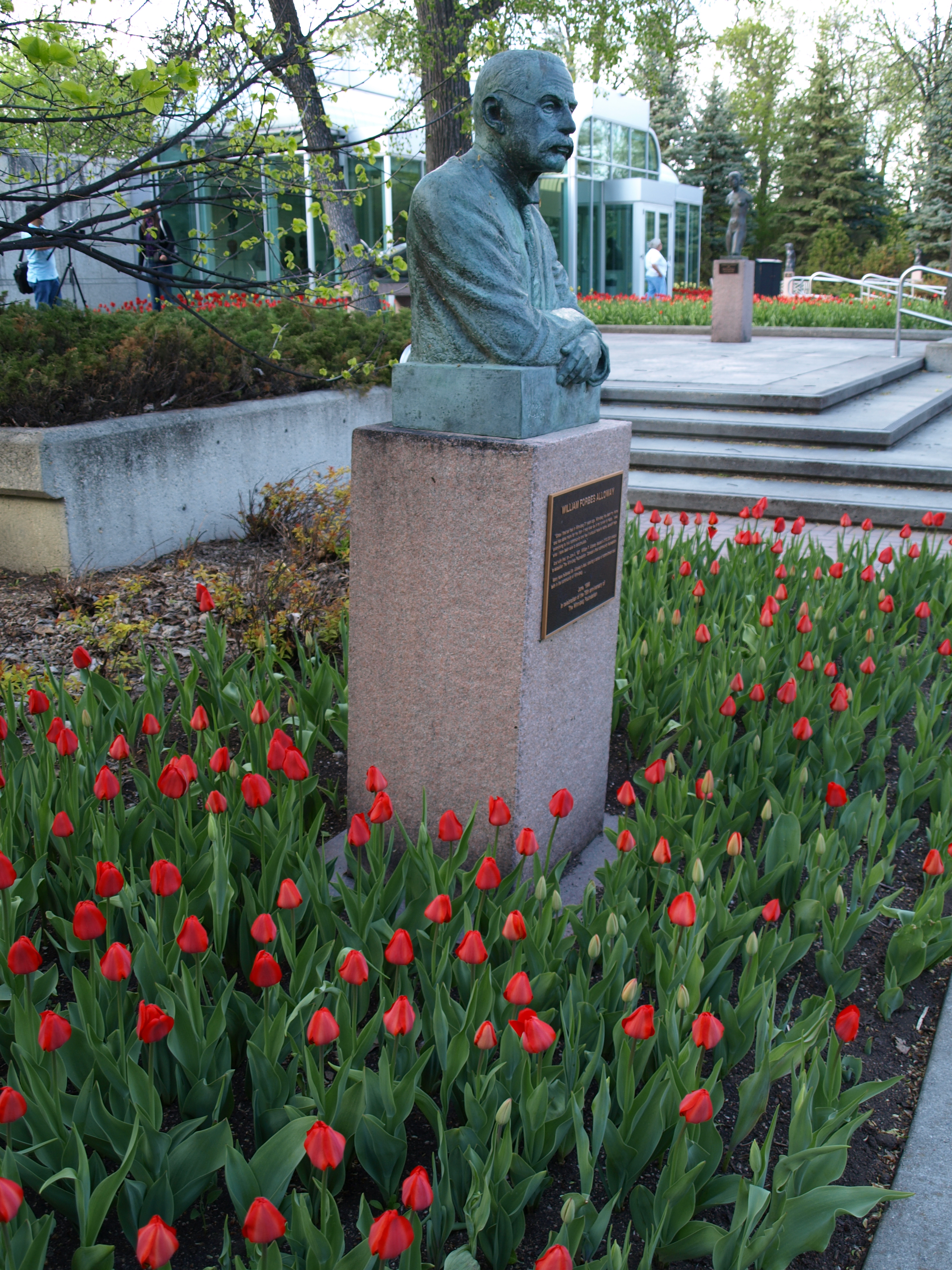
The bust of William Forbes Alloway, Leo Mol Sculpture Garden in Assiniboine Park Winnipeg

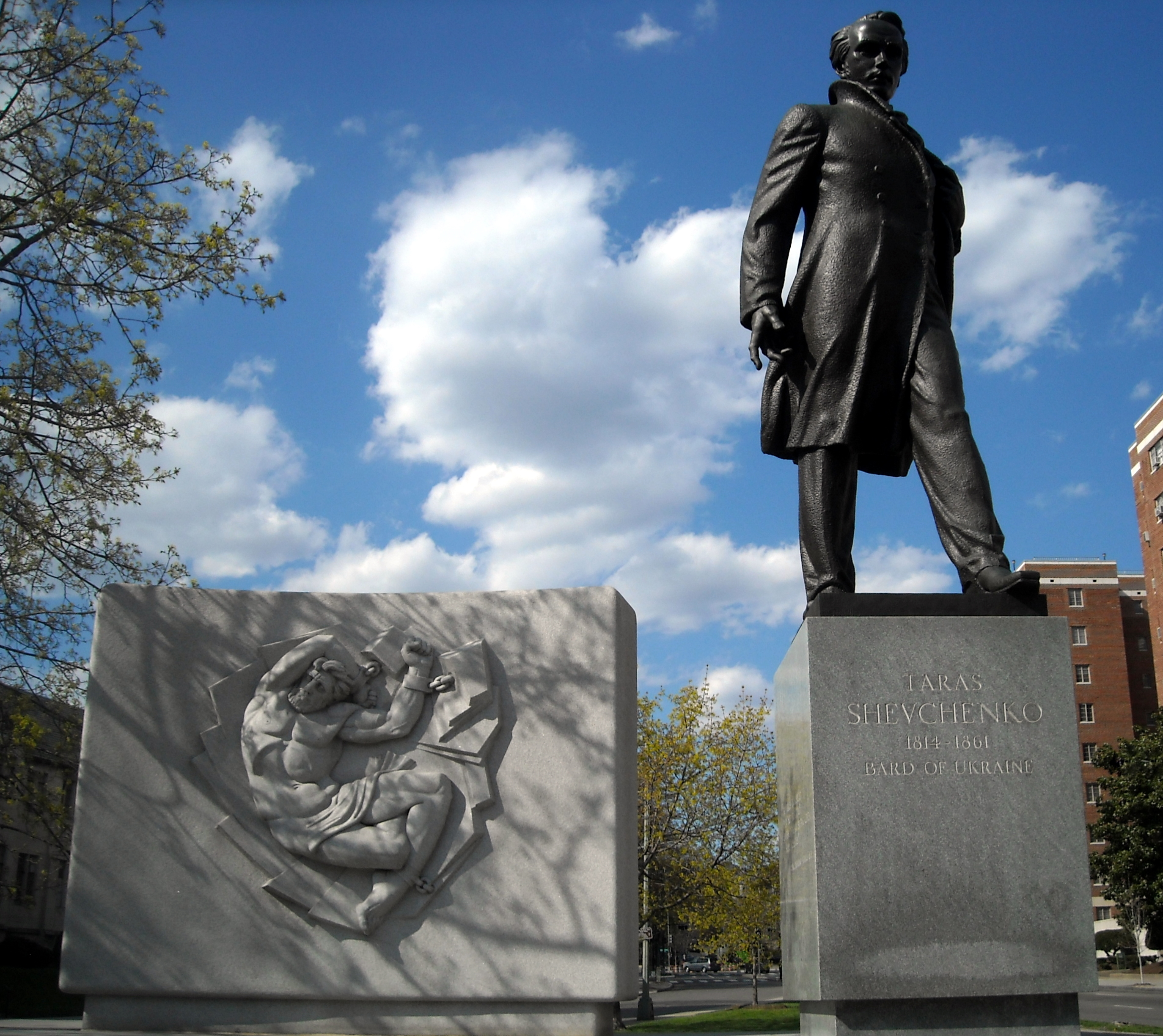
Taras Shevchenko Memorial in Washington, D.C.

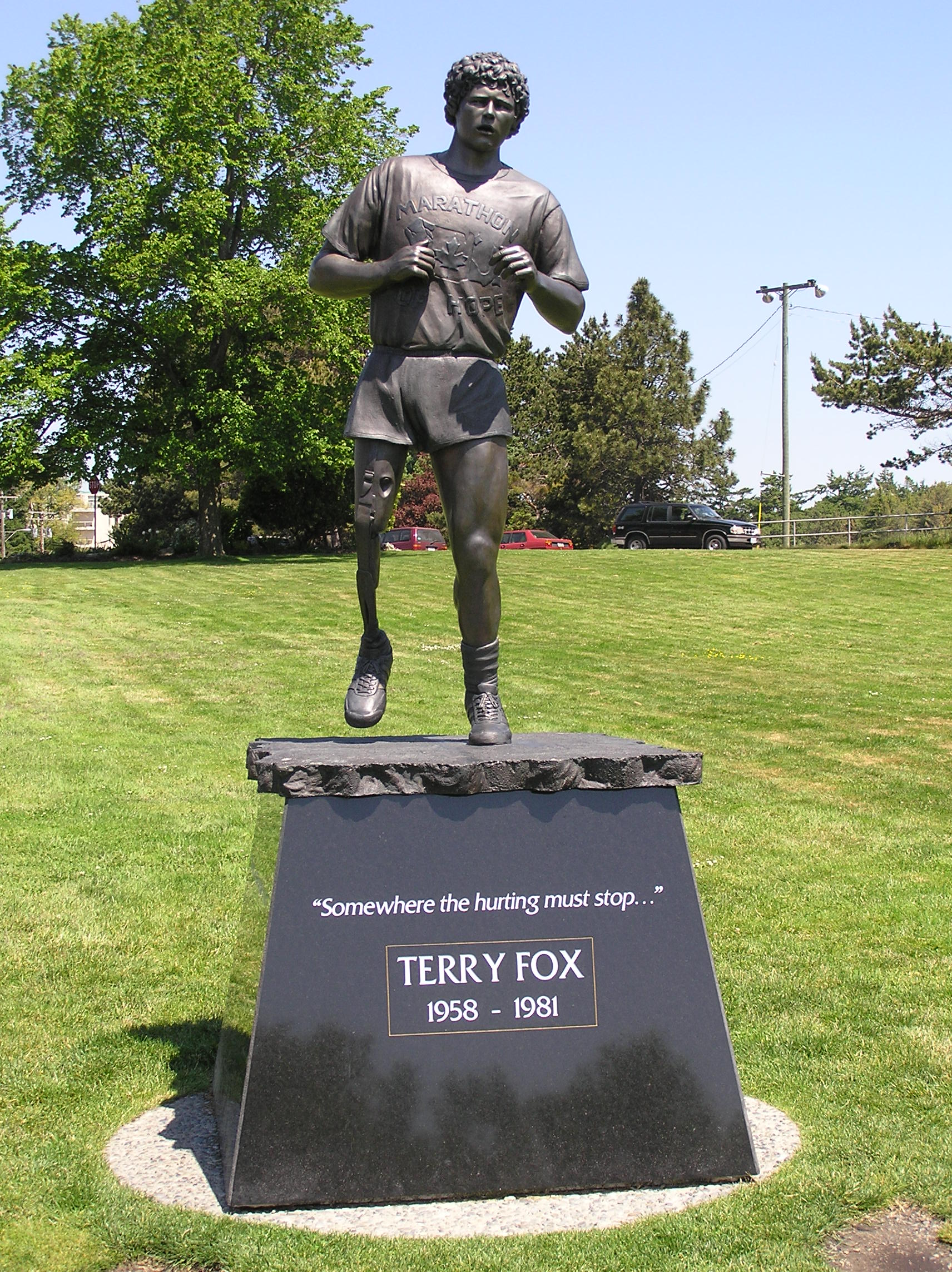
Leo Mol's statue of Terry Fox in Beacon Hill Park, Victoria, British Columbia engraved with "Somewhere the hurting must stop..."

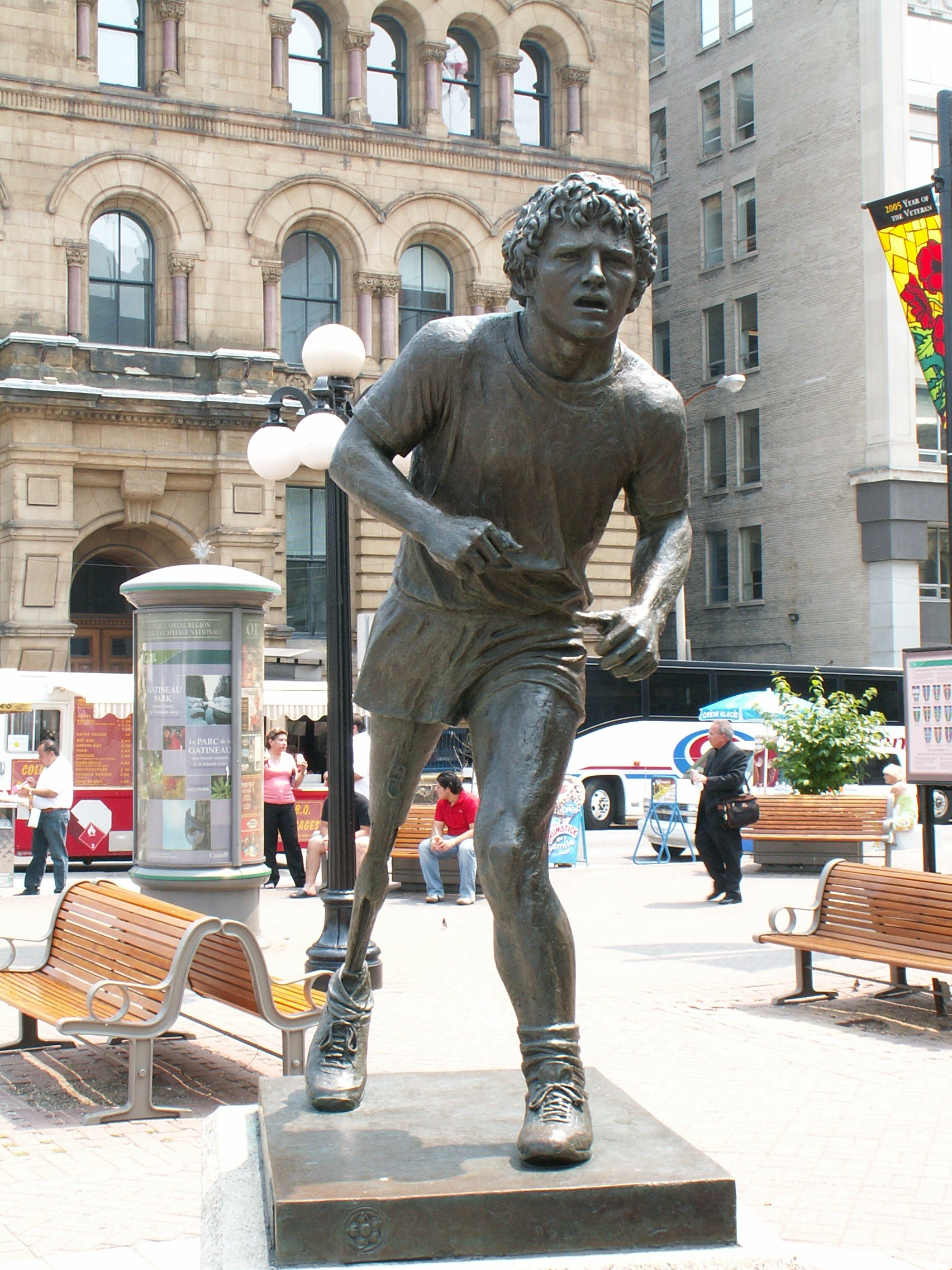
Leo Mol's statue of Terry Fox in Ottawa

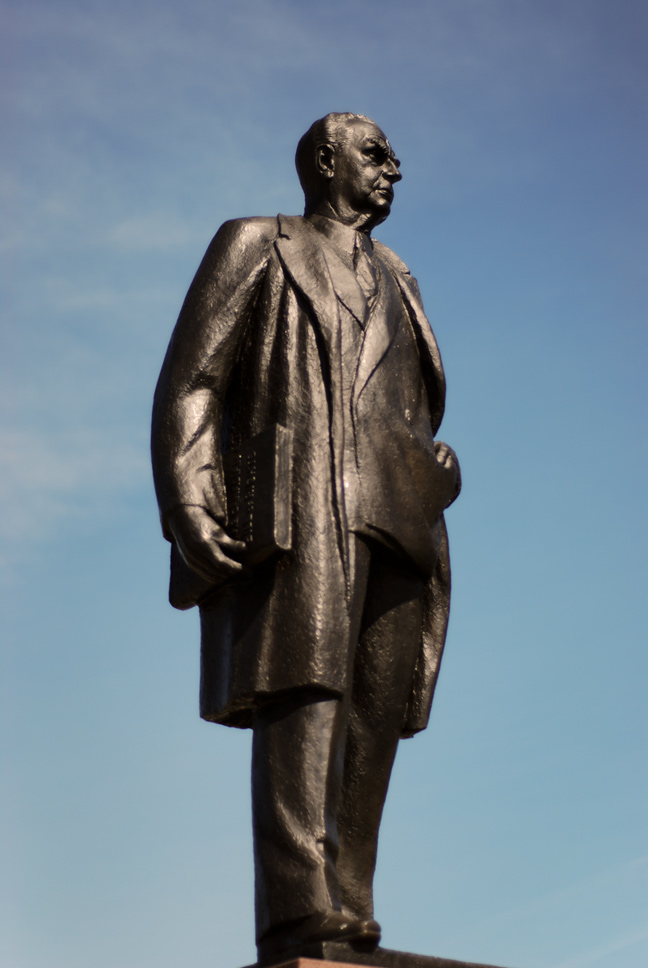
Leo Mol's Statue of John Diefenbaker on Parliament Hill, Ottawa Canada. He is depicted wearing an overcoat over a suit. He carries the Bill of Rights under his arm.

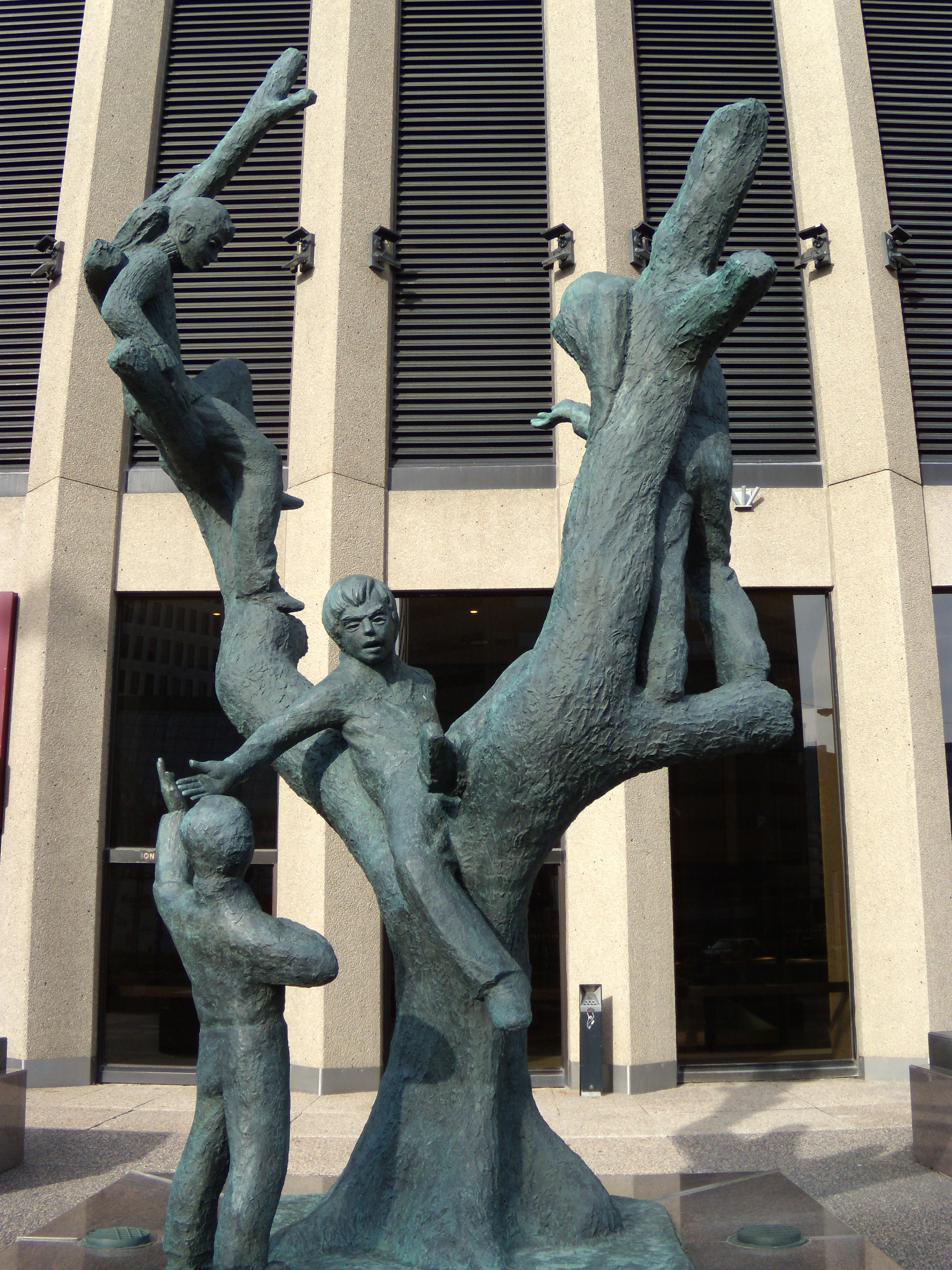
Tree Children sculpture in Winnipeg, Manitoba

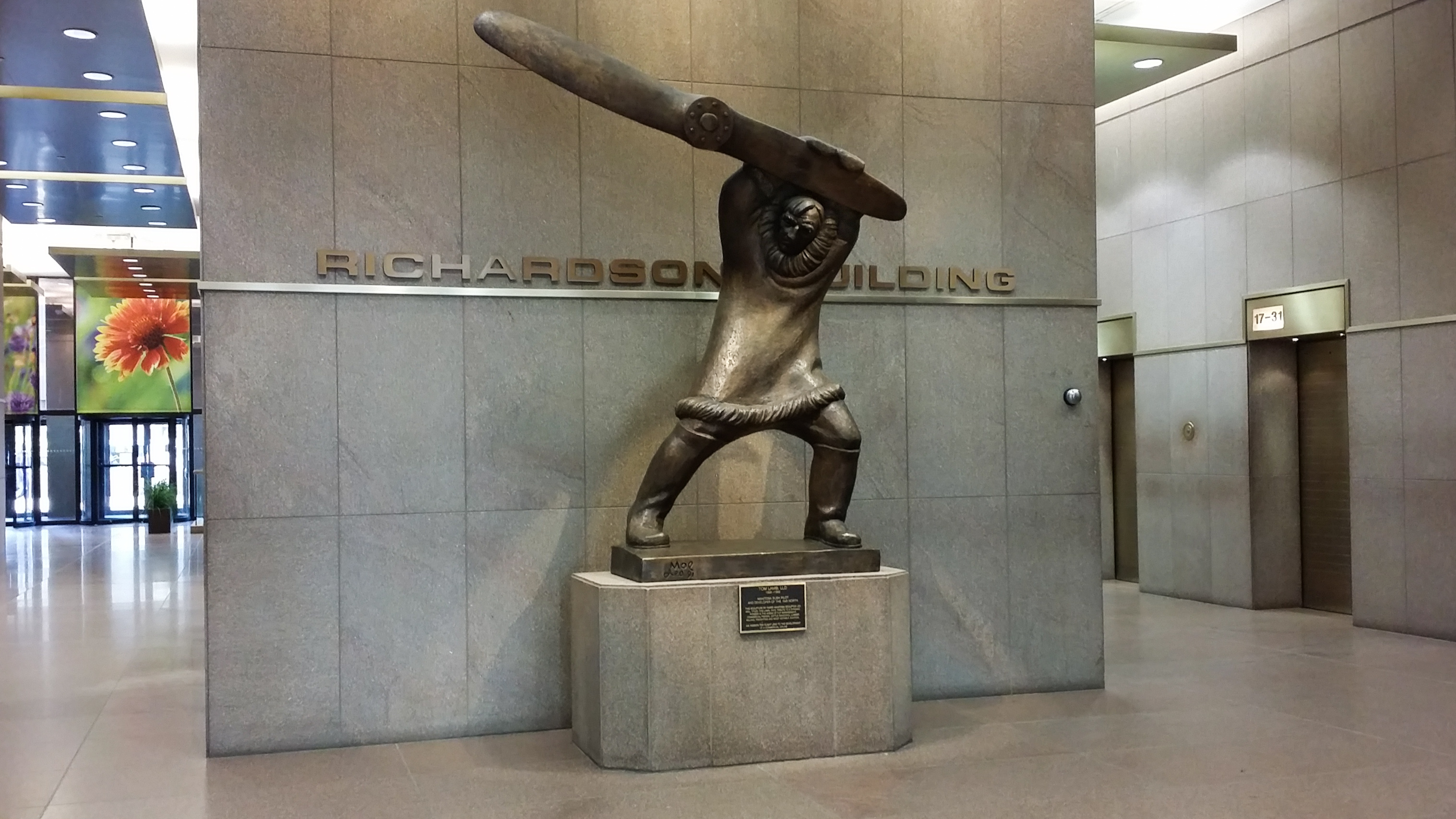
Tom Lamb, LLD in the Richardson Building lobby in Winnipeg, Manitoba

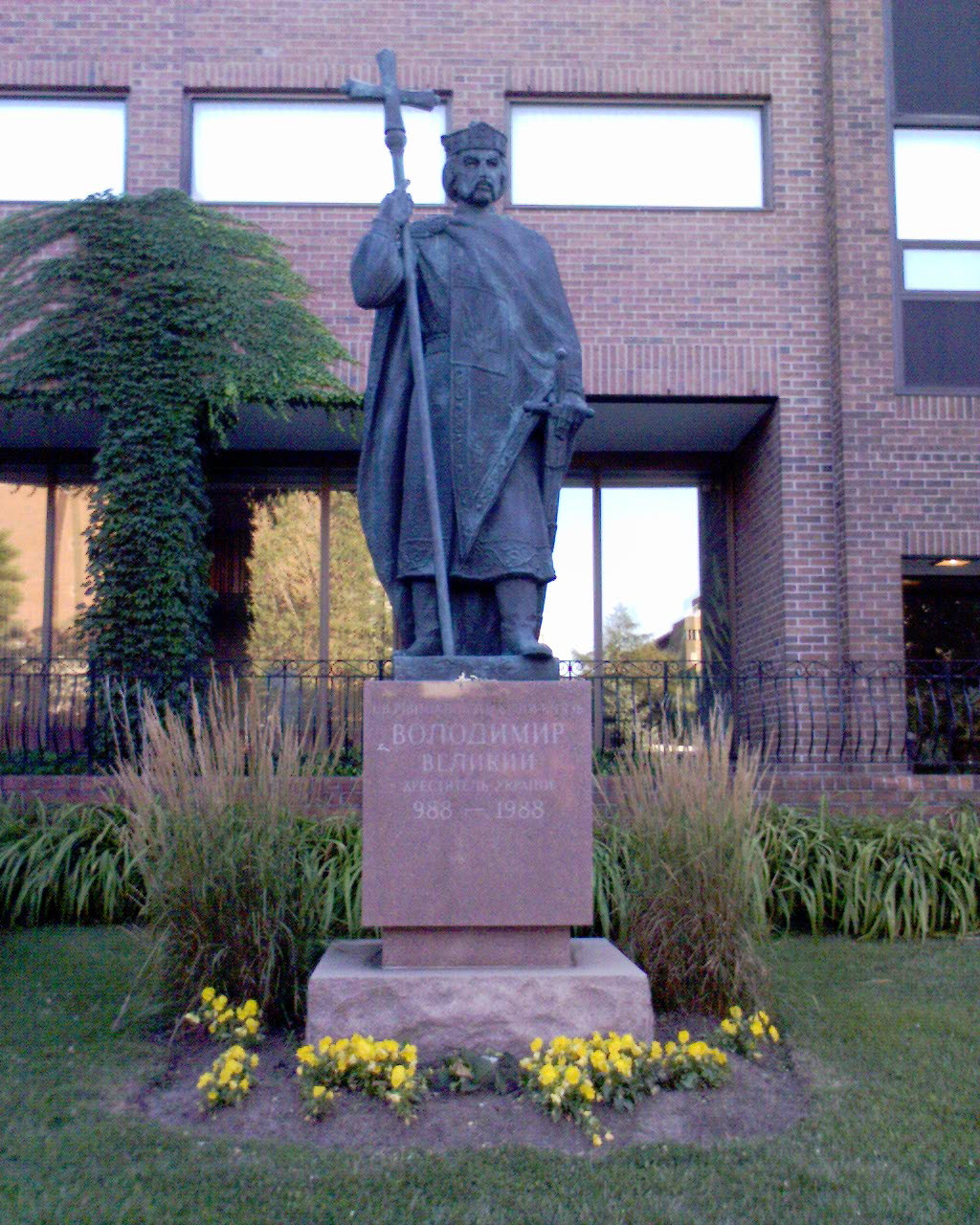
Statue of St. Volodymyr at St. Volodymyr Institute in Toronto, Ontario

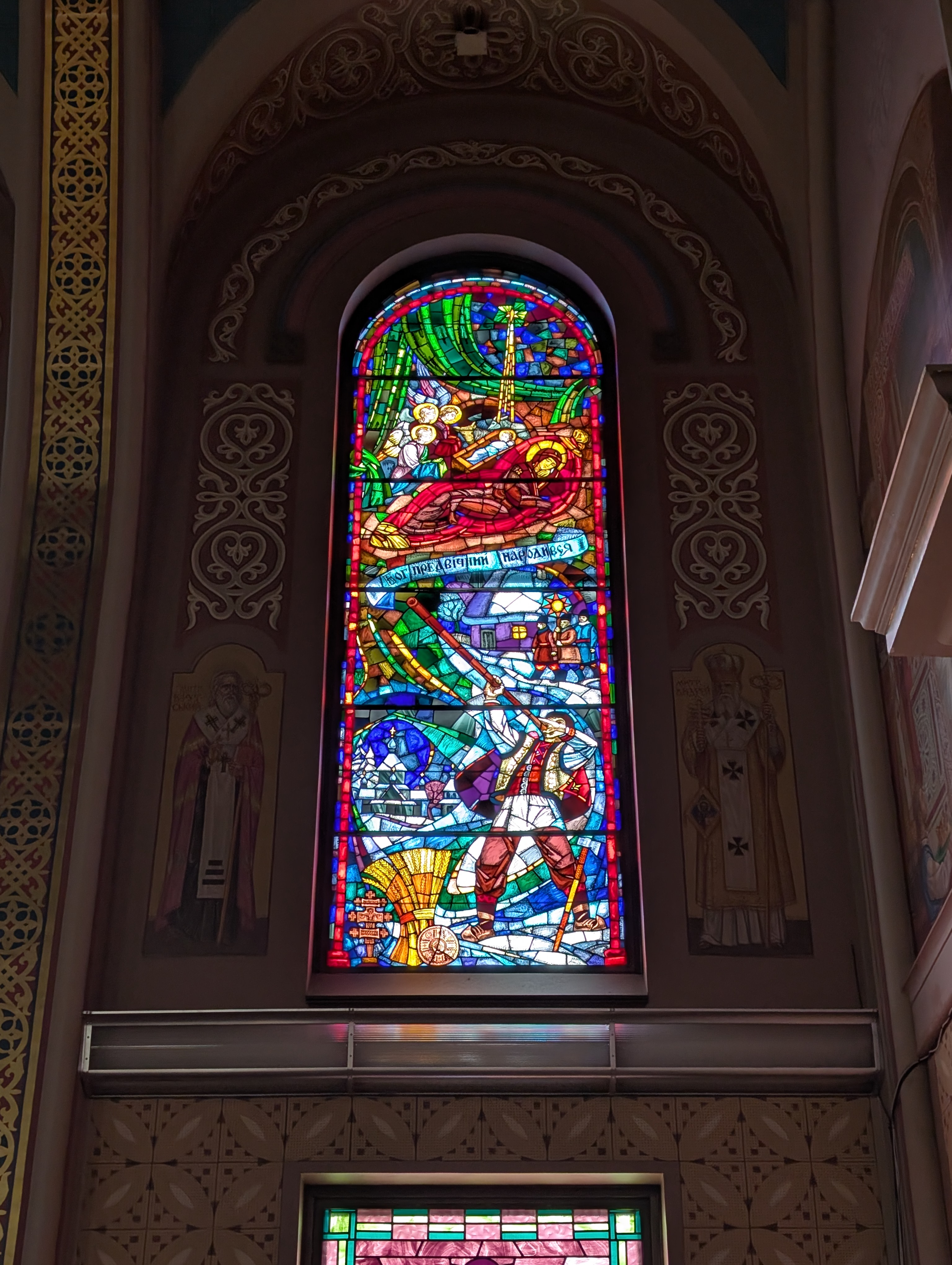
Stained-glass windows of Sts. Volodymyr and Olha Cathedral, Winnipeg

In 2002, his monumental bronze sculpture Lumberjacks (1990), which now stands in Assiniboine Park was featured on a 48¢ Canadian postage stamp in the sculptors series. Mol's small bronze sculpture of lumberjacks (1978) was his inspiration for a monumental bronze sculpture.

He was always known as a particularly prolific artist and some of his well-known works include likenesses of three different Popes which stand in museums in the Vatican. He also has a sculpture of Taras Shevchenko on display on Washington's Embassy Row.

Other important subjects who Mol sculpted include members of the Group of Seven, A. J. Casson, A.Y. Jackson and Frederick Varley. Mol also sculpted Sir Winston Churchill 1966, Winnipeg editorial cartoonist Peter Kuch (1917-1980), Dwight D. Eisenhower 1965, John F. Kennedy 1969, Elizabeth Bradford Holbrook ca. St. Volodymyr located at the St. Volodymyr Institute in Toronto. 1970, Terry Fox 1982. On Parliament Hill in Ottawa stands his impressive over life-size standing portrait figure of Prime Minister John Diefenbaker 1985. Also on Parliament Hill stands an impressive bronze statue of Elizabeth II. The maquette of Sir William Stephenson C.C. (code-named "Intrepid") is displayed in a place of honour within CIA Headquarters, Langley, VA, USA

In 2018, a church in Manitoba was raising money to protect its stained glass windows created by Leo Mol with bulletproof glass.

== Honours ==
In 1989, he was made an Officer of the Order of Canada. In 2000, he was awarded the Order of Manitoba. He was a member of the Royal Canadian Academy of Arts.

He received honorary degrees from the University of Winnipeg, the University of Alberta and the University of Manitoba.

Mol was also made an honorary academician of the Canadian Portrait Academy (Hon. CPA) in 2000.

Leo Mol's papers are held by the University of Manitoba Archives and Special Collections.
