= Assiniboine Park Pavilion =

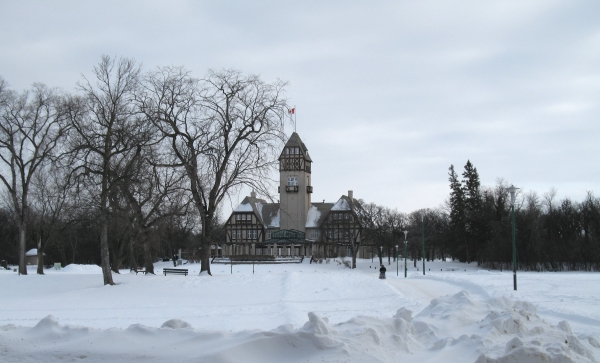
- Interactive map of the Assiniboine Park Pavilion area

General information
- Type: Pavilion
- Architectural style: Tudor, with some swiss chalet
- Location: 55 Pavilion Crescent, Winnipeg, Manitoba, Canada; R3P 2N6
- Coordinates: 49°52′20″N 97°13′49″W
- Opened: May 24, 1930
- Cost: $96,000

Height
- Observatory: 28 metres (92 ft) (tower)

Dimensions
- Diameter: 44 m × 22 m (144 ft × 72 ft)

Technical details
- Structural system: Half-timbering

Design and construction
- Architect: Cyril Chivers
- Architecture firm: Northwood & Chivers
- Main contractor: J. A. Trembly
- Pavilion Gallery Museum
- Established: 1998
- Type: museum and art gallery
- Curator: Peter Heymans
- Website: Official website

Heritage site
- Designation: Winnipeg Landmark Heritage Structure
- Recognized: April 5, 1982
- CRHP listing: November 16, 2007
- Recognition authority: City of Winnipeg
- CRHP ID: 8233

The Assiniboine Park Pavilion is a landmark building at Assiniboine Park in Winnipeg, Manitoba, Canada. It is today one of Winnipeg's most familiar landmarks.

Among other things, the building houses the Pavilion Gallery Museum, a museum and art gallery that opened in 1998.

== History ==
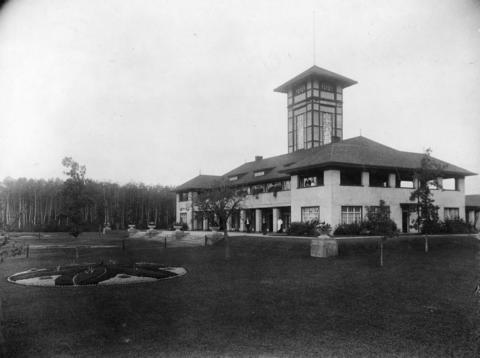
The original Assiniboine Park Pavilion c. 1920

=== Original pavilion (1908–1929) ===
The original Assiniboine Park Pavilion was completed in 1908, one year before the park's formal opening in 1909. Although Assiniboine Park had not yet officially opened, it was already in general use, and the pavilion was built as one of its first public amenities.

Designed by architect John D. Atchison, the pavilion reflected the early Prairie School architecture of Frank Lloyd Wright. Constructed at a cost of CA$19,000, it was intended for summer use. The Winnipeg Historical Buildings Committee described it as a "true pavilion" that was ornamental, visually striking, and built with light-frame construction. The pavilion housed a dance hall, banquet hall, and lunch and catering facilities. Its 90-foot (27 m) central tower contained a 16,000-US-gallon (61,000 L) water tank that drew water from the nearby Assiniboine River to supply the park's water system.

Behind the pavilion, a pergola and lily pond formed part of its landscaped setting. The pavilion remained in use for approximately 21 years before it was destroyed by fire in May 1929, following earlier structural problems.

=== Current pavilion (1930–1997) ===
The current Assiniboine Park Pavilion opened on 24 May 1930, one year after the original pavilion was destroyed by fire. Designed by the architectural firm Northwood & Chivers under principal architect Cyril Chivers, it was constructed at a cost of CA$96,000 as a permanent, year-round replacement for its predecessor. In contrast to the original pavilion's Prairie School design, Chivers drew inspiration from a variety of architectural traditions in creating the new building.

The pavilion's main floor housed a canteen and kitchens, while the second floor contained a restaurant, dining room, and a dance hall with capacity for approximately 500 people.

Nearly four decades later, in 1969, the pavilion was renovated to expand its refreshment facilities and create space for a souvenir shop and a park museum.

=== Restoration and museum (1998–present) ===
A major restoration and renovation completed in 1998 adapted the Assiniboine Park Pavilion to house the Pavilion Gallery Museum. The project also added a glazed solarium on the building's north side and created gallery space for the permanent collections of Manitoba artists Ivan Eyre, Clarence Tillenius, and Walter J. Phillips, while retaining space for a restaurant.

The pavilion subsequently housed two restaurants in succession: Tavern in the Park from 1998 to 2008, followed by Terrace Fifty-Five beginning in 2008. The pavilion no longer contains a permanent restaurant and is now used primarily for its art galleries and related cultural programming.

== Architecture ==
The Assiniboine Park Pavilion combines Tudor Revival architecture with elements of Swiss chalet style. Designed by the architectural firm Northwood & Chivers and completed in 1930, it replaced the original pavilion, which had been destroyed by fire the previous year. Principal architect Cyril Chivers drew inspiration from a variety of architectural traditions in developing the building's design.

The two-and-a-half-storey pavilion measures approximately 44 by 22 m (144 by 72 ft) and is organized around a central block with projecting wings. Its rough-cast stucco walls, decorative half-timbering, steeply pitched roofs, and multi-paned windows give the building its distinctive appearance, while a 28-metre (92 ft) observation tower rises above the roofline. Wood shingles, carved bargeboards, balconies, and pergolas extending toward a rectangular lily pond further define its exterior.

Inside, the pavilion retains a number of character-defining features, including its original H-shaped floor plan, maple flooring, mouldings, and staircases with wooden balustrades.

== Pavilion Gallery Museum ==
The Pavilion Gallery Museum, opened in 1998, is a museum and art gallery located within the Assiniboine Park Pavilion.

The gallery houses the largest collections of works by three internationally renowned Manitoba artists—Ivan Eyre, Clarence Tillenius and Walter J. Phillips—while the second floor area is dedicated to the work of emerging Manitoba artists.

The museum is affiliated with the CMA, the CHIN, and the Virtual Museum of Canada.
