= Leafy (disambiguation) =

LEAFY is a plant gene.

Leafy may also refer to:

- Leafy Anderson (1887–1927), an American religious leader
- LeafyIsHere (born 1995 or 1996), an American online personality banned from YouTube
- Paul Burnham (born 1964 or 1965), an English cricket supporter (nicknamed Leafy) and co-founder of Barmy Army
- Leafy, a character from the animated web series Battle for Dream Island
- Leafy greens, a type of vegetable

== See also ==
- Leaf (disambiguation)
