= Leif (disambiguation) =

Leif is a male given name of Scandinavian origin.

Leif may also refer to:

- Leif (film), 1987 Swedish comedy film
- Leif (rapper) (stylized Le1f, born 1989), American rapper
- Leif (album)

== See also ==
- Leaf (disambiguation)
- Leef (disambiguation)
