= Leef =

Leef may refer to:

== People ==
- Ryan Leef (born 1973), Canadian politician
- Daphni Leef (born 1986), Israeli social activist

== Other uses ==
- Leef Township, Madison County, Illinois

== See also ==
- John Ewbank Leefe (1813–1889), English botanist and Anglican priest
- Leaf (disambiguation)
- Leif (disambiguation)
