= Leaf (payment platform) =

Leaf is a platform technology by Leaf Holdings, Inc. that serves as a central hub for small business commerce. The Leaf platform consists of a tablet computer built specifically for Point of Sale (POS), and a cloud-based software tool for business management, analytics, and customer engagement. Leaf is designed to help retail stores, restaurants, and other small businesses improve the speed and ease of checkout, and to help business owners obtain better insight into, and control over their operations.

The company has no active website and is apparently defunct.

== History ==
Leaf was founded in January 2011 by Aron Schwarzkopf and Sebastian Castro and is financially backed by angel investors. Schwarzkopf graduated from Babson College with a degree in entrepreneurship in 2010 and a vague idea of how he wanted to revolutionize the way local companies do business in a world increasingly shifting to the cloud. Since then, he has led Leaf from an idea on a napkin through the introduction of its built-for-business tablet in late 2012, to a platform that processes more than $30 million a year in payments. Leaf started in the Boston metro market and recently revealed plans to move into more than 12 US markets in 2013.

== Technology ==
The Leaf platform is made up of three distinct pieces that work together to serve as the hub for small business commerce: The LeafPresenter, LeafBusiness, and the Leaf App Store.

- The LeafPresenter is an Android-based tablet built specifically for retail POS and is designed to replace traditional cash registers. With technology including a magnetic stripe card reader, near field communication (NFC), Europay MasterCard Visa (EMV), and front and rear-facing cameras, it is capable of accepting payments via traditional credit cards, gift cards, next-generation payment methods such as PayPal or LevelUp, and a number of mobile wallets. By taking an agnostic approach to payment acceptance, the company allows merchants to work with the payment processors of their choice.
- LeafBusiness is an online analytics and management portal that provides merchants with insights into their business. The portal is accessible from any device (tablet, smartphone, personal computer), and includes inventory management, employee management, analytics and reporting tools for merchants.
- The Leaf App Store is designed to supplement and extend the core features in Leaf's technology platform by allowing third-party developers to create applications that run on the LeafPresenter and integrate with LeafBusiness. For example, developers could create customized apps that cater to specific business needs or vertical markets such as payroll and inventory management, restaurant reservation systems or salon appointment tools.
