= Andy Leaf =

English footballer

Personal information
- Full name: Andrew Keith Leaf
- Date of birth: 18 January 1962 (age 64)
- Place of birth: York, England
- Height: 5 ft 10 in (1.78 m)
- Position: Defender

Youth career
- –1980: York City

Senior career*
Years	Team	Apps	(Gls)
1980–1981	York City	1	(0)
- Huby & Magnet
Total		1	(0)
- * Club domestic league appearances and goals

Andrew Keith Leaf (born 18 January 1962) is an English former professional footballer who played as a defender in the Football League for York City, and in non-League football for Huby & Magnet.
