= John Ewbank Leefe =

English amateur botanist and vicar

- Born: 13 May 1813; Richmond, Yorkshire
- Died: 8 August 1889 (aged 76); Redcar
- Scientific career
- Fields: Botany
- Author abbrev. (botany): Leefe

John Ewbank Leefe FLS (1813–1889) was an English amateur botanist and vicar in the Church of England. He was a leading expert on the British willows (Salix).

== Education and career ==
He was the son of Octavus Leefe of Richmond, Yorkshire, an alderman and magistrate, and his wife Mary Wright, daughter of Thomas Wright of Richmond. In 1831 he matriculated at Trinity College, Cambridge. He graduated there B.A. (24th Wrangler) in 1835 and M.A. in 1838. He was ordained a deacon (Oxford) in 1838 and became a priest in 1840. He became in 1841 a vicar at St Mary the Virgin, Saffron Walden (near the Audley End House and Gardens). From 1844 to 1849 he was a curate at Bishopwearmouth. From 1849 to 1882 he was the vicar of Cresswell, Northumberland. He retired to Highcliff, Coatham, Redcar.

Leefe was elected a Fellow of the Linnean Society on 19 November 1868. He was a member of the Tynesides Naturalists' Field Club (founded in 1846), became their vice-president, and president from 1873 to 1874. He collected in various locations in England, the north of Wales, the Scottish Borderlands, and the far north of Scotland. Most of his letters and botanical specimens are at Kew. He recorded rainfall and temperature data at Cresswell until 1881.

== Family ==
He married Maria Favell on 6 August 1845 in Crosthwaite. They had 5 children, James Octavian (1846–1846), Constance Maria (1848–1875), John Beckwith (1849–1922), Henry Ewbank (1851–1901), and Charles Octavius (1854–1897). John Beckwith Leefe became a general in the British Army. Charles Octavius Leefe became an executive engineer in the British Raj's Indian Civil Service and died of cholera.

== Selected publications ==
- Leefe, J. E. (1844). "XIV.Remarks on some of curious Metamorphoses of the Pistil of Salix caprea". Transactions of the Botanical Society of Edinburgh. 1 (1–4): 113–114. doi:10.1080/03746604409467518.
- Leefe, J. E. (1844). "XIX.—On the Groups of Triandræ and Fragiles of the Genus Solix". Transactions of the Botanical Society of Edinburgh. 1 (1–4): 155–163. doi:10.1080/03746604409467523.
