= Eliza Elizabeth Leaf =

New Zealand studio photographer (c. 1818 – 1908)

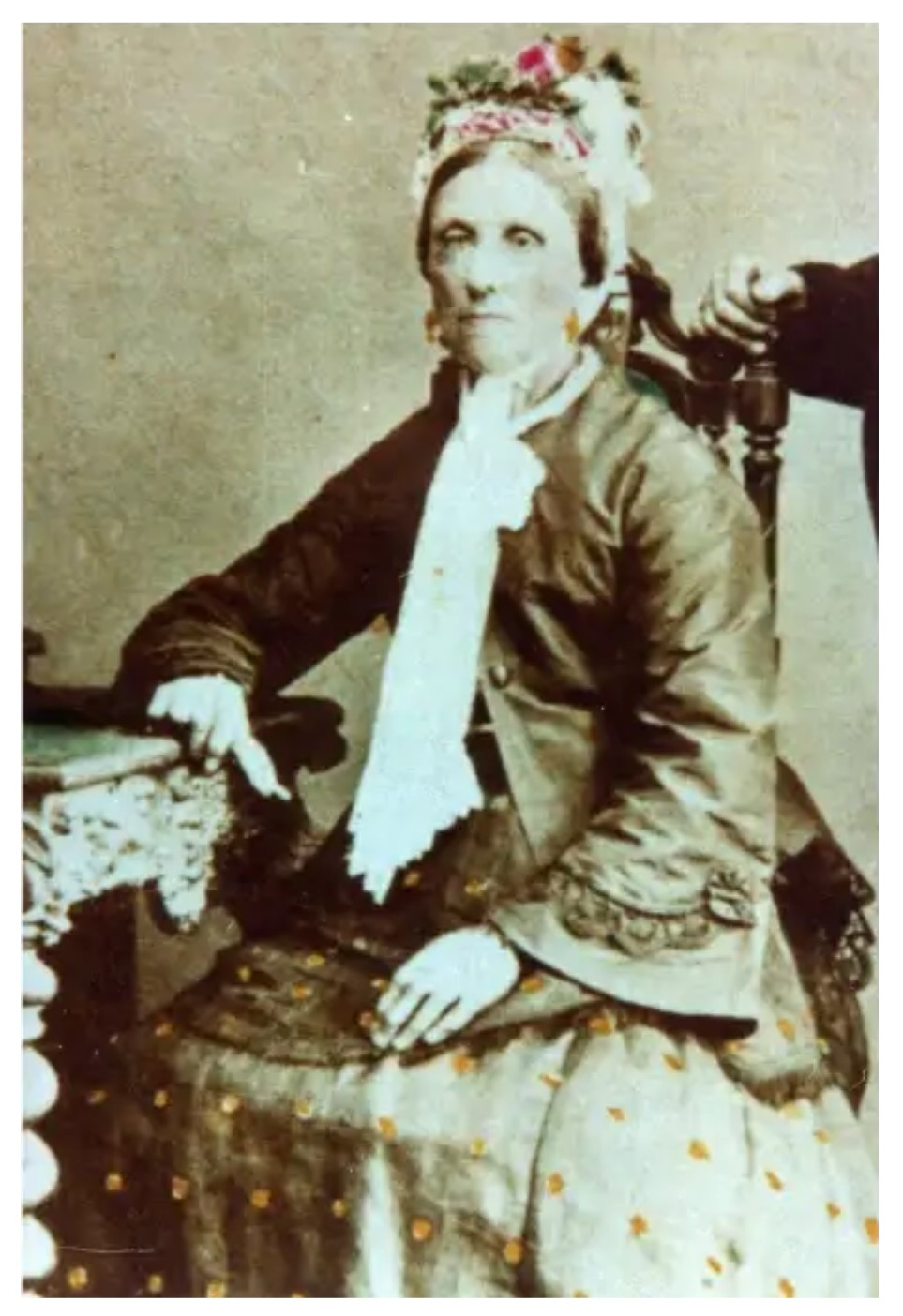
- Eliza Leaf, circa 1865
- Born: c. 1818
- Died: 1908

Eliza Elizabeth Leaf (c. 1818 – 1908) was a New Zealand studio photographer. She was born in Yorkshire, England, and emigrated to Aotearoa New Zealand with her family in 1862. She may have been New Zealand's first professional female photographer.

== Her life in England ==
Between 1851 and 1861 she started in photography, learning in the studio of the Yorkshire firm of Pickering & Piper. Here she was taught the process of making positive images on glass—commonly known as the ambrotype, or 'Zylo-Iodide of silver' by her. When her employers' partnership ended, she opened her own photography studio in her hometown, Beverly, Yorkshire. The family said they would be 'emigrating' soon, and the studio offered generous discounts for portraits. In March 1862 the studio property was for sale.

According to the 1861 British census, she and her son Robert defined themselves as 'photographers'. It is very possible that Robert Leaf learned photography from his mother.

== Photography career in Aotearoa New Zealand ==
An ad by Robert Leaf on the newspaper offering a 'portable photographic gallery' is an indicator that Eliza and Robert might have been working as photographers as early as 1865, in a studio located on the opposite of Government House. In 1868, the humble building it was described as 'a great eyesore' by the newspaper the Daily Southern Cross.

She died on 10 September 1908.
