= Leaf Books =

Welsh independent publishing house

Leaf Books was a small independent publishing house based in South Wales. It specialised in the publication of short fiction, micro-fiction and poetry by both new and established authors.

Leaf Books had links to the University of South Wales, and was launched with the help of the university's GTI project.

The company was dissolved in July 2015.
