= John D. Aitchison =

John D Aitchison
- Born: Ontario, Canada
- Occupations: Molecular cell biologist, systems cell biologist and academic

Academic background
- Education: B.Sc. Biotechnology and Genetic Engineering; Ph.D. Biochemistry
- Alma mater: McMaster University

John D Aitchison is a Canadian American molecular cell biologist, systems cell biologist, and academic. He serves as a Principal Investigator at Seattle Children's Research Institute and Professor in the Department of Pediatrics, an Affiliate/Adjunct Professor in the Department of Biochemistry, at the University of Washington (UW). Serving as an Affiliate Professor at the Institute for Systems Biology (ISB), he is also an adjunct professor at University of Alberta (UAlberta).

Aitchison's research interests include using systems biology to understand complex biological phenomena. His work has spanned from basic cell biology, using yeast as a model system, focusing on understanding molecular mechanisms of nuclear transport and peroxisome biogenesis and function to host-pathogen interactions, studying how viruses and other pathogens influence cellular function. His research lab also developed and applied systems biology approaches to reveal fundamental insights into cell biology, host-pathogen interactions, and infectious disease.

== Education ==
From 1982 to 1992, Aitchison studied at the Department of Biochemistry at McMaster University, earning his B.Sc. in Biotechnology and Genetic Engineering and his PhD in Biochemistry with Richard Rachubinski. He then served as a Medical Research Council of Canada Post-Doctoral Fellow, followed by an HHMI Post-Doctoral Associate at Rockefeller University with Günter Blobel until 1997.

== Career ==
Aitchison was a scholar for both the Medical Research Council of Canada and the Alberta Heritage Foundation for Medical Research, while also working as an assistant professor at UAlberta. In 2000, he joined ISB in Seattle, as a founding faculty member, where he progressed to director of integrative biology – a position he concurrently held at Seattle Biomedical Research Institute (SBRI), also known as the Center for Infectious Disease Research (CIDR), from 2011 to 2013. Between 2011 and 2018, he held various positions at SBRI/CIDR, including director, senior vice president, executive director, scientific director, chief science officer, and president. In 2018, SBRI/CIDR was integrated into Seattle Children's in 2018, where he codirected the Center for Global Infectious Disease Research through 2024.

== Research ==
=== Systems cell biology ===
Aitchison's research into the complex dynamics of cellular organization has focused on peroxisome biogenesis and function as well as nucleocytoplasmic transport.

Aitchison conducted research on peroxisomes which focused on their biogenesis as an integrated program from signaling through transcription, translation, and building the organelle. His group developed technologies, analysis tools and systems approaches, including 'omics, network modeling, machine learning, combined with molecular cell biology.

Aitchison's work in yeast on nuclear transport mechanisms and the nuclear pore complex has led to insights into structure of the nuclear pore complex, and the discovery of a large family of nuclear transport factors – broadly termed karyopherins (aka importins and exportins). Together with his colleagues, he introduced the "virtual gating" model, elucidating the rapid and selective transport of large macromolecules across nuclear pore complexes in eukaryotic cells. His work has also led to the discovery of a role for the nuclear pore complex in control of chromatin organization, and thereby, regulation of gene expression.

=== Host-pathogen interactions ===
Aitchison and his lab have conducted research that merges high-throughput technologies, computational biology, and systems biology to understand cellular organization, dynamics, and host-pathogen interactions, especially in global infectious diseases. He unveiled mechanisms shaping cellular dynamics and host-pathogen interactions during infections from viruses and other pathogens. Among insights into host-based immune responses using systems approaches, he proposed that upon infection, viruses induce vulnerabilities into host cells that can be exploited to kill virally infected cells. The proposal is based on the fact that viruses alter host cells in dramatic ways, including hijacking host cell proteins to support viral replication. He showed that such cells can be selectively killed to abrogate virus production using the concept of synthetic lethality.

=== Covid therapeutics ===
Aitchison and his colleagues have also developed a cohort of nanobodies from llama antibodies as potent COVID-19 therapeutics and identified effective cocktails that act synergistically to prevent infection and respiratory disease, presenting an approach to combat the respiratory infections and future pandemics.

== Selected articles ==
- Aitchison JD, Blobel G, Rout MP. (1996) Kap104p: a karyopherin involved in the nuclear transport of messenger RNA binding proteins. Science 274(5287):624-7
- Rout, M. P., Aitchison, J. D., Suprapto, A., Hjertaas, K., Zhao, Y., & Chait, B. T. (2000). The yeast nuclear pore complex: composition, architecture, and transport mechanism. The Journal of Cell Biology, 148(4), 635–652.
- Aitchison JD, Rout MP. (2001) The nuclear pore complex as a transport machine. Journal of Biological Chemistry 276 (20), 16593-16596
- Ramsey SA, Smith JJ, Orrell D, Marelli M, Petersen TW, de Atauri P, Bolouri H, Aitchison JD. (2006) Dual feedback loops in the GAL regulon suppress cellular heterogeneity in yeast. Nat Genet. 38(9):1082-7
- Smith, J. J., & Aitchison, J. D. (2013). Peroxisomes take shape. Nature Reviews Molecular Cell Biology, 14(12), 803–817.
- Van de Vosse DW, Wan Y, Lapetina DL, Chen WM, Chiang JH, Aitchison JD, Wozniak RW. (2013) A role for the nucleoporin Nup170p in chromatin structure and gene silencing. Cell.152(5):969-83
- Mast FD, Fridy PC, Ketaren NE, Wang J, Jacobs EY, Olivier JP, Sanyal T, Molloy KR, Schmidt F, Rutkowska M, Weisblum Y, Rich LM, Vanderwall ER, Dambrauskas N, Vigdorovich V, Keegan S, Jiler JB, Stein ME, Olinares PDB, Hatziioannou T, Sather DN, Debley JS, Fenyö D, Sali A, Bieniasz PD, Aitchison JD, Chait BT, Rout MP. (2021) Highly synergistic combinations of nanobodies that target SARS-CoV-2 and are resistant to escape. Elife. 2021 10:e73027.
- Mast FD, Navare AT, van der Sloot AM, Coulombe-Huntington J, Rout MP, Baliga NS, Kaushansky A, Chait BT, Aderem A, Rice CM, Sali A, Tyers M, Aitchison JD. (2020) Crippling life support for SARS-CoV-2 and other viruses through synthetic lethality. J Cell Biol. 219(10):e202006159
- Litvak V, Ratushny AV, Lampano AE, Schmitz F, Huang AC, Raman A, Rust AG, Bergthaler A, Aitchison JD, Aderem A. (2012) A FOXO3-IRF7 gene regulatory circuit limits inflammatory sequelae of antiviral responses. Nature 18;490(7420):421-5
