= Ecole Tuxedo Park School =

Location
- 2300 Corydon Ave; Winnipeg, Manitoba, R3P 0N6; Canada
- 49°51′58″N 97°13′01″W

Information
- Motto: A Little School With a Big Heart
- Established: 1927
- Educational authority: Pembina Trails School Division
- Principal: Karine Rioux
- Grades: K-4
- Enrollment: 98
- Language: English and French
- Mascot: Tux-y the Penguin

École Tuxedo Park School is a French immersion elementary school in Winnipeg, Manitoba, Canada. It teaches grades K-4 and is part of the Pembina Trails School Division.

== History ==
When the Town of Tuxedo incorporated in 1913, discussions began to be held about the construction of a school. By 1925, formal plans for a two classroom school were underway and the original structure was built in 1926. Tuxedo School No. 2 was designed to match the wealthy atmosphere of the surrounding residences, by the architecture firm Northwood and Chivers, who also designed the Assiniboine Park Pavilion. Two more classrooms were added in 1932 to make room for the growing population of Town of Tuxedo. The name of the school was later changed to Tuxedo Park School.

The school was also used as a Police Office, with the basement housing an office for Town of Tuxedo's Constable, Paul Behr and his dog Sprite. The basement also had a small cell to detain criminals before transport to Winnipeg.

In 1957–1959, a major addition of six classrooms and a gymnasium were added to the existing structure. The new additions were designed by Smith Carter and Katelnikoff.

Tuxedo Park School became a French Immersion school in 1984 and changed its name to École Tuxedo Park.

Due to changing catchment areas, enrolment dropped and the school was threatened with closures. However an active parent council petitioned to keep the school open and were ultimately successful.

In 2000, a volunteer committee of parents created an outdoor classroom and gardens in the north lawn and a massive renovation of the grounds in the west grounds.

In 2001, Ecole Tuxedo Park celebrated its 75th anniversary. To mark the 75th anniversary and to the completion of the Greenspace Project, a time capsule was installed in the sundial in the centre of the garden. The Time Capsule is due to be opened in 2026.

In 2003, the parent council hosted a one-day playground build. For this service, and for the completion of the Greenspace project and improvements to the indoor space, the Parent Council received the Premiers Volunteer Service award in the Community Category.

In 2017, École Tuxedo Park reduced its offerings, eliminating its grades 6 and 5 programs.

== Media ==
For the 75th their anniversary Garth Nosworthy wrote the song I Will Stand Forever to commemorate the history of the school.
