= Tuxedo, Winnipeg =

Suburb of Winnipeg, Canada

Tuxedo
- Suburb
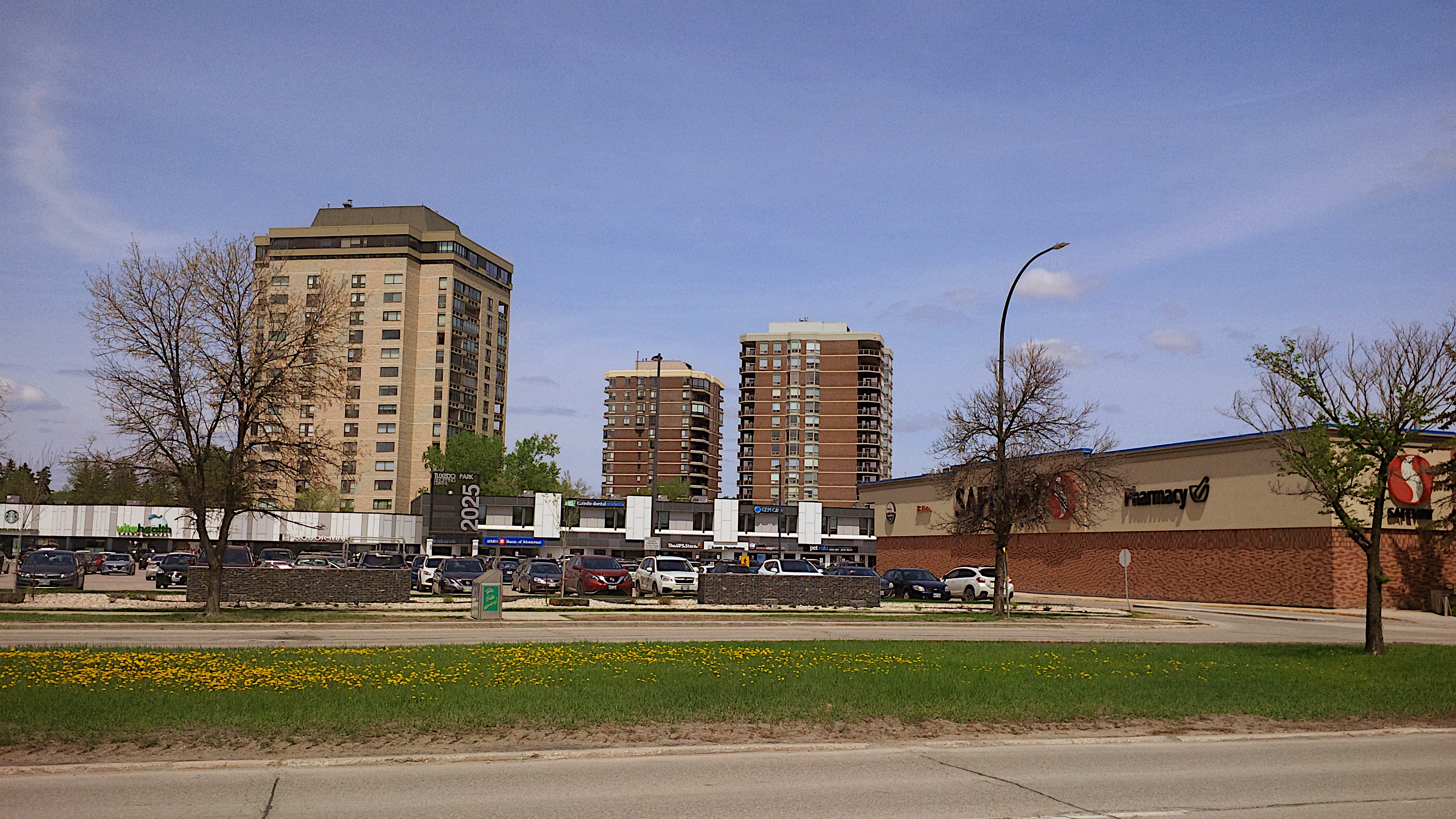
- Tuxedo skyline
- Motto: "Winnipeg's Suburb Beautiful"
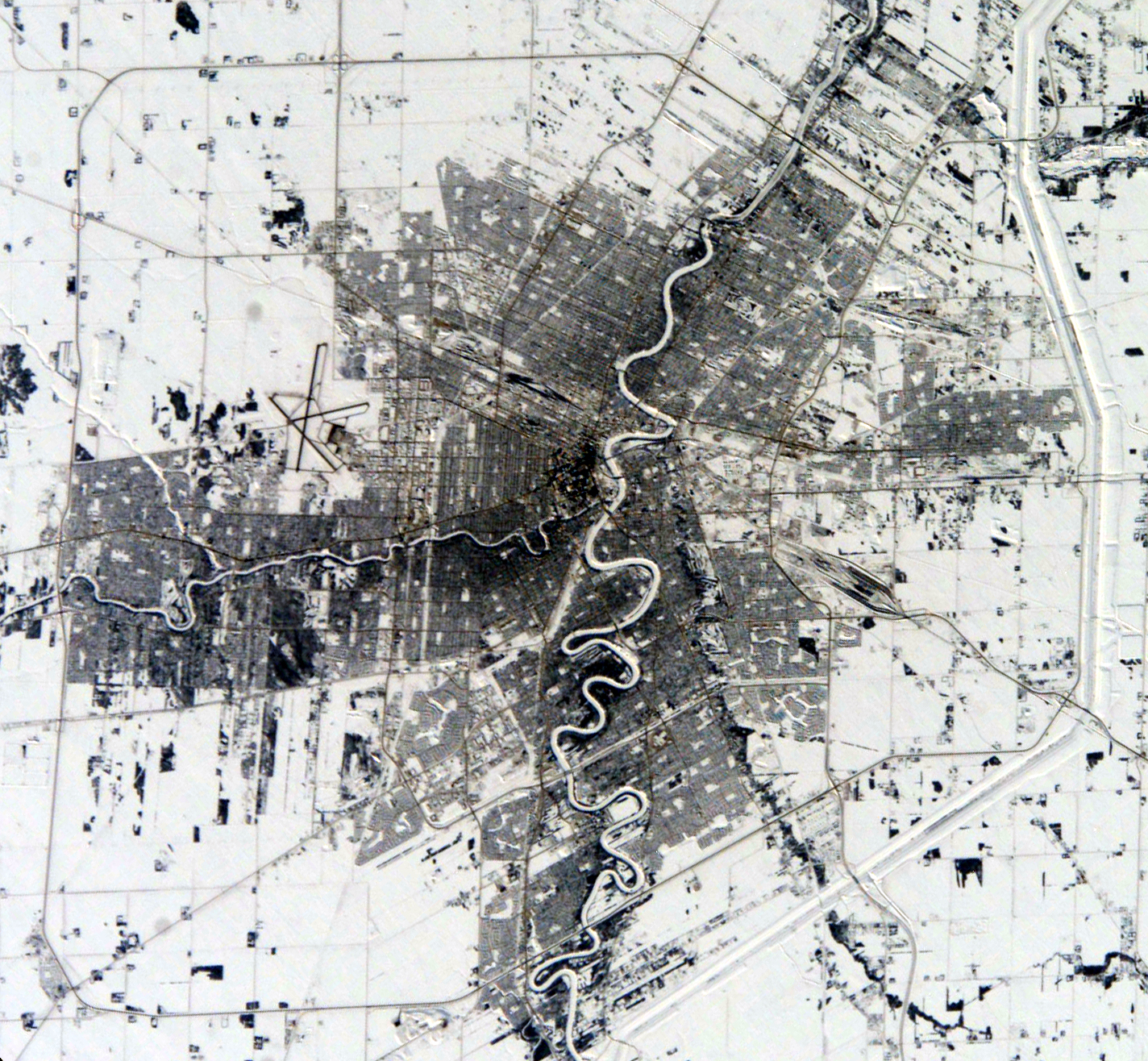
- Location within Winnipeg
- Coordinates: 49°51′43″N 97°13′19″W
- Country: Canada
- Province: Manitoba
- City: Winnipeg
- Incorporated (town): January 24, 1913
- Amalgamated (Winnipeg): January 1, 1972
- Founder: Frederick W. Heubach

Government
  - MP: Doug Eyolfson Winnipeg West
  - MLA: Carla Compton Tuxedo (electoral district)
  - Councillor: Evan Duncan

Area
  - Suburb: 11.9 km^{2} (4.6 sq mi)
  - Metro: 5,306.79 km^{2} (2,048.96 sq mi)
- Elevation: 234 m (768 ft)

Population (2016)
  - Suburb: 7,145
  - Density: 600/km^{2} (1,560/sq mi)
  - Metro: 778,489
- Forward Sortation Areas: R3P
- Area codes: 204 and 431

Tuxedo is a residential suburb of Winnipeg, Manitoba about 7 kilometres (4.3 miles) southwest of downtown Winnipeg. It borders the Assiniboine River and Assiniboine Park to its north, Shaftesbury Boulevard to its west, Route 90 to its east, and McGillivray Boulevard to its south. Before 1972, the community was incorporated as the "Town of Tuxedo". Tuxedo is part of the city ward of Charleswood-Tuxedo-Westwood. It also belongs to the provincial electoral district of Tuxedo and the federal electoral district of Winnipeg South Centre.

== Etymology ==
Tuxedo was named after Tuxedo Park, a village in Orange County, New York.

== History ==
Tuxedo was founded when land was purchased by a group of businessmen between 1903 and 1910 to establish a planned "exclusive residential-only suburban enclave." From 1903 to 1905, the Tuxedo Park Company Limited, directed by Winnipeg-based real estate agent Frederick W. Heubach on behalf of American investors Frederick E. Kenaston, E. C. Warner, and Walter D. Douglas, began to purchase land for residential development. The company acquired farmland owned by Mary and Archibald Wright, along with several smaller land purchases, bringing the total area to about 1,200 hectares (3,000 acres). To transform the native scrub vegetation into what Heubach envisioned as a "Suburb Beautiful", Heubach hired Rickson A. Outhet, an architect and engineer out of New York City, to create an appropriate plan. The Outhet plan was never implemented.

In 1910, after acquiring additional land, Heubach and his associates formed the South Winnipeg Company, which absorbed the Tuxedo Park Company, and commissioned American landscape architects Olmsted Brothers to plan the subdivision. Their plan included a site intended for the University of Manitoba, then located in downtown Winnipeg.

Although development of the area was delayed for a variety of reasons investors continued to support the venture and several companies were created to manage land transactions and investments: Tuxedo (Winnipeg) Syndicate Limited, South Winnipeg Limited (later South Winnipeg 1923 Limited), Norwood (Winnipeg) Syndicate Limited, Warner Land Company, Tuxedo Estates Limited, Kenaston Realty Company, University Estates Limited, Assiniboine Estates Limited, Assiniboine Investments Limited, South Assiniboine Estates Limited, West Rydal Limited, and The Canadian Agency.

The Town of Tuxedo was formally incorporated on 24 January 1913, with Heubach as its first mayor and a four-member council. Other mayors included David R. Finkelstein (served 1915–1951), Cecil A. R. Lamont (1952–1961), and Clive K. Tallin (1961–1971). The town had its own police department, fire department, and recreation commission, and was part of a health unit including St. James, Assiniboia, St. Vital, Fort Garry, and Charleswood. There were three public schools in the town, managed by the Assiniboine South School Division No. 3, including Tuxedo School No. 1709, opened in 1927. Also in the late 1920s, Heubach Park was established, a purely residential subdivision within Tuxedo.

The Metropolitan Planning Commission indicated as far back as 1946 that Grant Avenue would be extended through the Town of Tuxedo. In the mid-1950s, a project to extend Grant Avenue through Tuxedo and onto Charleswood, terminating at Roblin Boulevard, would lead to the bisection of Heubach Park. However, Tuxedo mayor Cecil Lamont opposed this plan and preferred that the major thoroughfare be placed southward near Eldride. The Town changed its position by 1960, making way for the $50 million project, which included an additional 1,600 homes and the westward extension of Grant Avenue over the next 10 years. The initial portion of the new subdivision would be located west of Heubach Park between Corydon Avenue and Mountbatten Road.

Map showing the former boundaries of the Town of Tuxedo.

Until the 1960s, retail locations were prohibited in Tuxedo. Rules were eased to allow the construction of an apartment complex and a small shopping mall, Tuxedo Park Shopping Centre, which opened on October 30, 1963. Liquor sales followed suit in 1969. A monument celebrating the incorporation of the Town was installed in Heubach Park in July 1970, dedicated by the Metropolitan Corporation of Greater Winnipeg. In 1972, Tuxedo amalgamated with Winnipeg and 12 other suburbs in the Unicity scheme. Records for the Tuxedo Park Company, as well as municipal records for Tuxedo, are now held at the City of Winnipeg Archives.

In the early 1990s, Larry Fleisher, who then represented Tuxedo on Winnipeg City Council, requested spending $250,000 on improving Heubach Park and for the project to commence by 1993. In the 2010s, commercial development of Tuxedo South led to the opening of several shopping areas, including an IKEA store, an Outlet Collection mall, and a Seasons of Tuxedo big-box cluster.

== Neighbourhoods ==
The suburb of Tuxedo contains multiple neighbourhoods. They all are part of the Assiniboine South Neighbourhood Cluster, the city ward of Charleswood-Tuxedo-Westwood, the provincial electoral district of Tuxedo, and the federal electoral district of Winnipeg South Centre.

=== Old Tuxedo ===
Old Tuxedo is a suburban neighbourhood in Winnipeg bounded by the Assiniboine River to the north, Park Boulevard North to the west, Roblin Boulevard to the south, Tuxedo Avenue to the southeast, and Route 90 to the east. It is one of the few areas that still reflects the Olmsted Company's original plan for the Town of Tuxedo.

Residential development began shortly after the town's incorporation in 1913. Early building covenants limited houses to occupying no more than 40 per cent of their lots and to a maximum height of 18 m (60 ft), shaping the neighbourhood's low-density character.

The first house built in Old Tuxedo was Carey House, constructed in 1915 at 121 Park Boulevard North. Designed by architect Raymond Carey, son-in-law of developer F. W. Heubach, the three-storey residence was built for Carey and his wife, Clare. The Winnipeg Architectural Society describes the house as classically inspired, with Georgian and French Classical influences expressed through its roofline, symmetry, and detailing. Carey House was still standing in 2023.

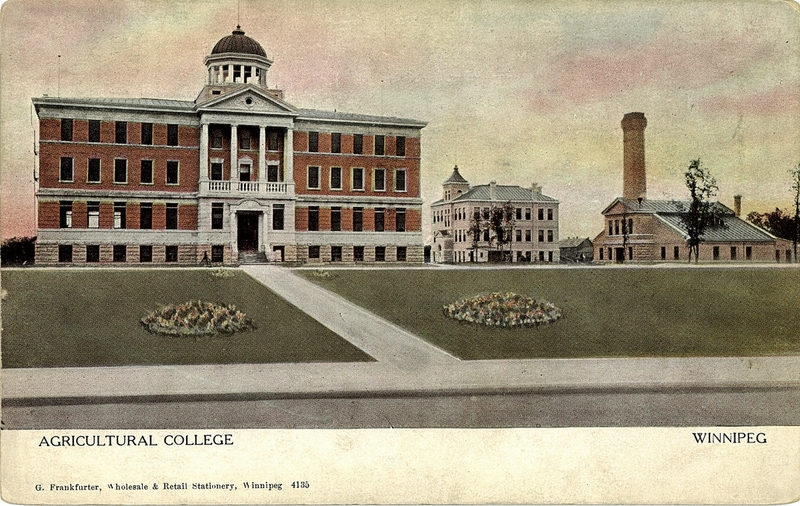
The Manitoba Agricultural College

Old Tuxedo also contains several institutional sites. The original buildings of the Manitoba Agricultural College are located in the neighbourhood and have been used as a school for the deaf, Fort Osborne Barracks, and a juvenile court. The site later became part of the Asper Jewish Community Campus, which includes the Berney Theatre, Rady Centre, and Gray Academy of Jewish Education, among other organizations. It was designated a provincial historic site in 1995.

The neighbourhood is also home to the Manitoba Youth Centre, a provincial juvenile detention facility. Nearby amenities include the Kenaston Willow Parkette.

According to the 2016 Census, Old Tuxedo is 85.4 per cent Anglophone. The largest non-white groups identified were Indigenous or Métis (10.4 per cent) and Filipino (6.6 per cent). The average household income was reported as $186,161, compared with a citywide average of $44,915.

=== Tuxedo ===
This neighbourhood is bordered by Corydon Boulevard to the north, Route 90 to the east, Grant Avenue to the south, and the Assiniboine Park to the West. According to the 2016 Census, the neighbourhood is 86.4% Anglophone with 10 exclusively Francophone residents. The neighbourhood is majority white, with the largest non-white ethnic groups being Indigenous or Métis (3.6%). The average income of the neighbourhood is $116,538, three times higher than the city average of $44,915.

=== South Tuxedo ===
South Tuxedo's borders are Grant Avenue to the north, Route 90 to the east, the Canadian National Rail lines to the south, and Shaftesbury Avenue to the west. According to the 2016 Census, the neighbourhood is 89.7% Anglophone. The neighbourhood is majority white, with the largest non-white ethnic groups being South Asian (3.6%) followed by Chinese (2.5%) and Indigenous or Métis (2.5%). The average income of the neighbourhood is $107,549, two and a half times higher than the city average of $44,915.

== Demographics ==
Federal census population history of Tuxedo
Year	Pop.	±%
1916	192	—
1921	1,062	+453.1%
1926	717	−32.5%
1931	1,173	+63.6%
1936	1,017	−13.3%
1941	735	−27.7%
1946	677	−7.9%
1951	1,627	+140.3%
1956	1,163	−28.5%
1961	1,627	+39.9%
1966	2,480	+52.4%
1971	3,258	+31.4%
Source: Statistics Canada

Tuxedo also has a large Jewish population. 33% of Winnipeg's Jewish population live in Tuxedo, with Tuxedo being home to the Asper Jewish Community Campus. 31.4% of Tuxedo's population is Jewish.

2016 Population of Tuxedo by neighbourhoods
	2016 Pop.	Area km^{2}.
Old Tuxedo	915	0.8
Tuxedo	2,245	2.4
South Tuxedo	3,440	2.1
Tuxedo Industrial	545	6.6
TOTAL	7,145	11.9

== Crime ==
Tuxedo has a low crime rate. The table below shows the crime rates of various crimes in each of the Tuxedo neighbourhoods. The crime data spans 5 years from the year 2017 to the year 2021. The rates are crimes per 100,000 residents per year. Note: The crime table includes adjacent areas (Assiniboine Park and Edgeland) not counted in the Tuxedo population figure of 7,145.

Crime rates per 100,000 people in Tuxedo neighbourhoods, 2017–2021
Neighbourhood	Pop.	Homicide	Rate (Note: Rate per 100,000 people per year: Figure is calculated by dividing the total incidents of a crime by the neighbourhood population, then multiplying by 100,000, and then dividing by 5, as the data spans 5 years)	Robbery	Rate	Agr. Aslt. (Note: Aggravated assault: Includes assaults which cause bodily harm or utilize weapons; includes the following categories given on Winnipeg CrimeMaps: aggravated assault, aggravated sexual assault, assault against peace officer, assault with weapon or causing bodily harm, attempted murder, firearms offences, sexual assault with a weapon.)	Rate	Cmn. Aslt. (Note: Common assault: Excludes assaults which cause bodily harm or utilize weapons; includes the following categories given on Winnipeg CrimeMaps: assault against peace officer, common assault, other assaults, sexual assault.)	Rate	Utt. Threat (Note: Abbreviated from: uttering threats)	Rate	Property	Rate
Assiniboine Park	0	0	--	3	--	2	--	8	--	2	--	98	--
Edgeland	1,255	0	0.0	23	366.5	24	382.5	61	972.1	25	398.4	572	9,115.5
Old Tuxedo	915	0	0.0	0	0.0	10	218.6	80	1,748.6	21	459.0	211	4,612.0
South Tuxedo	3,440	0	0.0	4	23.3	2	11.6	12	69.8	4	23.3	340	1,976.7
Tuxedo	2,245	0	0.0	13	115.8	7	62.4	39	347.4	14	124.7	277	2,467.7
Tuxedo Industrial	545	0	0.0	29	1,064.2	14	513.8	32	1,174.3	26	954.1	1,413	51,853.2
Tuxedo (including adjacent areas)	8,400	0	0.0	72	171.4	59	140.5	232	552.4	92	219.0	2,911	6,931.0

== Education ==
Tuxedo is host to one elementary school, Ecole Tuxedo Park School and one public high school, Shaftesbury High School. It is also host to two private schools: Gray Academy of Jewish Education, and St. Paul's High School.

== Points of interest ==
- Assiniboine Park and Assiniboine Park Zoo
- Outlet Collection Winnipeg
- Rady Jewish Community Centre
- Winnipeg Jewish Theatre
- Winnipeg Studio Theatre

International real estate developer, financier and former Lord Mayor of London, England, Sir Denys Lowson (via South Winnipeg Development Co. Ltd.), announced in March 1963 that Bird Construction was chosen as the company to build the Tuxedo Park Shopping Centre (2025 Corydon Avenue) designed by Smith Carter architects and opened on 30 October 1963. The new Centre included a 10-pin bowling alley and billiards. The Shopping Centre was phase 1 of 2 phases on 15 acres of land, with the second phase seeing the construction of 3 apartment towers.

Heubach Park (originally Olmsted Park) is a purely residential subdivision within Tuxedo that was created in the late 1920s. Heubach Park itself comprises 26 acres of landscaped land (trees, shrubs). At one time, there was a flower bed at the southern edge of the Park at Grant Avenue, but it was later removed. As much as possible, utility wires were buried so as not to be visually cluttering. Privately owned and run and situated south of Assiniboine Park, the Tuxedo Golf Course was constructed between 1932 and 1933 and officially opened in May 1934. It features both regular 18-hole golf as well as 18-hole miniature golf runs.
