= Winnipeg Route 105 =

Route 105
- Grant Avenue; Roblin Boulevard
- Route 105 highlighted in red

Route information
- Maintained by City of Winnipeg
- Existed: 1966–present

Major junctions
- East end: Route 42 (Pembina Hwy)
- Route 70 (Stafford St); Route 80 (Waverley St); Route 90 (Kenaston Blvd); Route 96 south (Shaftesbury Blvd); Route 96 north (W.R. Clement Pkwy); Route 95 (Roblin Blvd)
- West end: PTH 100 (Perimeter Hwy) / PR 241 west

Location
- Country: Canada
- Province: Manitoba

Highway system
- Provincial highways in Manitoba; Winnipeg City Routes
← Route 96	→ Route 115

Route 105 is a major east–west arterial route in the city of Winnipeg. It runs through the suburbs of Fort Rouge, River Heights, Tuxedo, and Charleswood. It is the eastern extension of Provincial Road 241, which runs westward to the communities of Headingley and Lido Plage. Within the city boundaries it connects the residential and light industrial areas west-southwest of downtown with the Pembina Highway and downtown.

== Route description ==
Route 105 begins at the Pembina Highway and runs westward as Grant Avenue through Fort Rouge, River Heights, and Tuxedo, then passes through the Assiniboine Forest while multiplexed with Route 96. It then becomes Roblin Boulevard, passing through central and west Charleswood before meeting the city limits at the Perimeter Highway. The road continues both as Roblin Boulevard and as Provincial Road 241 until it reaches the unincorporated community of Lido Plage, at which point it joins Provincial Road 424.

Grant Avenue was named for Cuthbert Grant, a prominent Métis leader and the Sheriff of Assiniboia in 1839. Roblin Boulevard is named for Sir Rodmond Roblin, Premier of Manitoba from 1900 to 1915.

== Major intersections ==
From east to west. The entire route is in Winnipeg.

Street Name	km	mi	Destinations	Notes
Grant Avenue	0.0	0.0	Pembina Highway (Route 42)	Route 105 eastern terminus
Grant Avenue	1.2	0.75	Stafford Street (Route 70)	
Grant Avenue	2.9	1.8	Waverly Street (Route 80 south)	
Grant Avenue	4.9	3.0	Kenaston Boulevard (Route 90)	
Grant Avenue	6.7	4.2	Shaftesbury Boulevard (Route 96 south) – Canadian Mennonite University, Assiniboine Park	East end of Route 96 concurrency
Grant Avenue	9.3	5.8	William R. Clement Parkway (Route 96 north)	West end of Route 96 concurrency
Grant Avenue	10.1	6.3	Roblin Boulevard (Route 95 east)	Route 95 western terminus; Grant Avenue west end; Roblin Boulevard east end
Roblin Boulevard	13.5	8.4	Perimeter Highway (PTH 100) PR 241 west (Roblin Boulevard) – Headingley	Interchange, PTH 100 exit 40; Route 105 western terminus; PR 241 eastern terminus; PR 241 continues west
1.000 mi = 1.609 km; 1.000 km = 0.621 mi: Concurrency terminus; Route transition
