= Charleswood, Winnipeg =

Suburb of Winnipeg, Manitoba, Canada

Charleswood
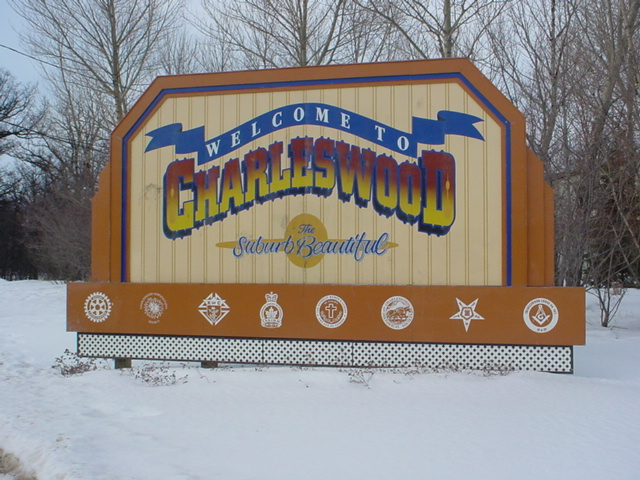
- “Welcome to Charleswood: The Suburb Beautiful,” the welcome sign located along the area's main street, Roblin Boulevard

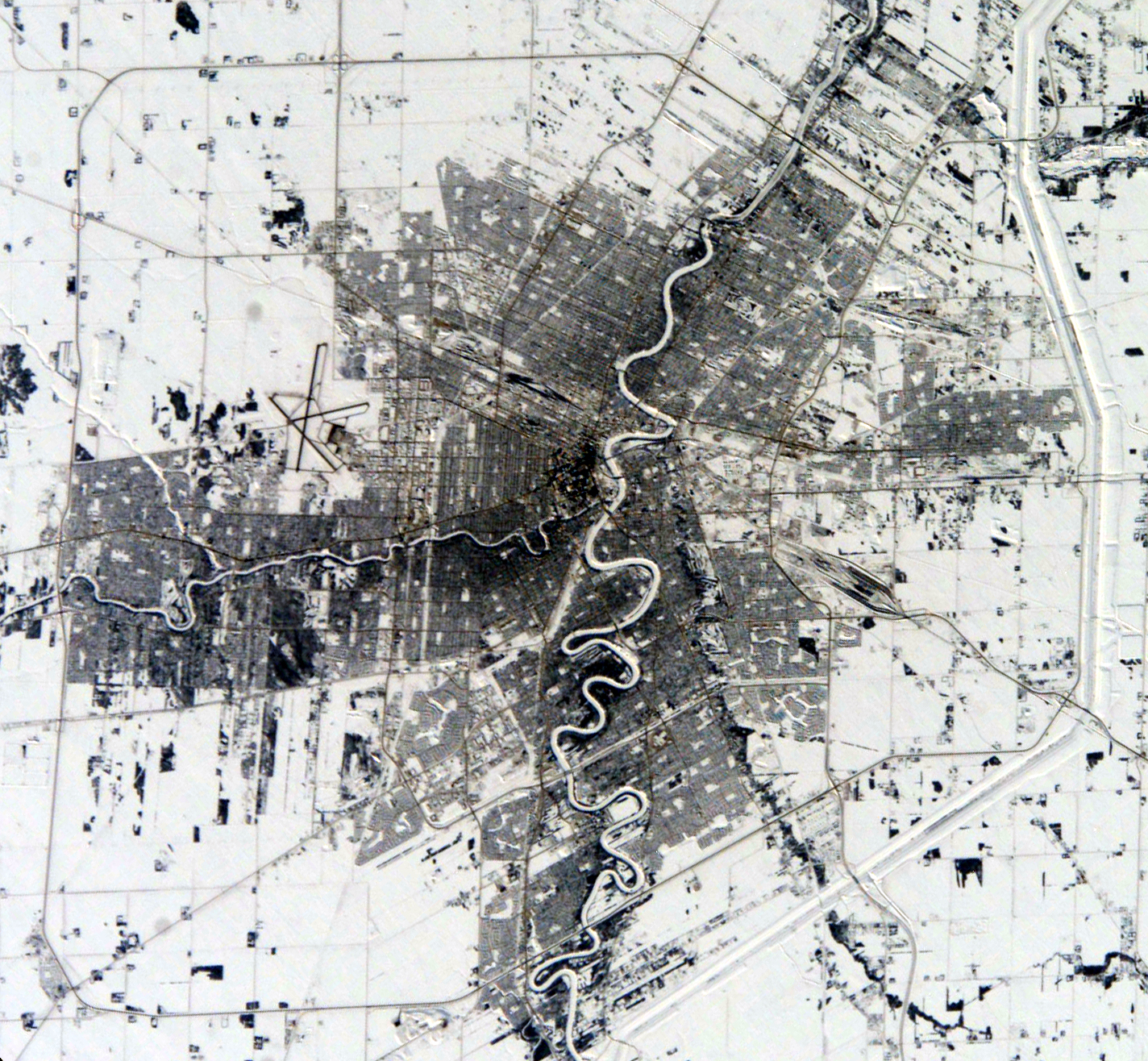
- Location within Winnipeg
- Coordinates: 49°51′09″N 97°17′03″W
- Country: Canada
- Province: Manitoba
- City: Winnipeg

Government
  - MP: Marty Morantz (Charleswood—St. James—Assiniboia—Headingley)
  - MLA: Kathleen Cook (Roblin)
  - Councillor: Evan Duncan (Charleswood-Tuxedo-Westwood)

Population
  - Total: 25,679.
- Forward Service Area: R3R

Charleswood is a residential community and neighbourhood in Winnipeg, Manitoba, Canada. Situated in the southwest of the city, it is bordered by the neighbourhoods of Tuxedo to the east, Whyte Ridge to the south, and the Rural Municipality of Headingley to the west. The area's boundaries are defined by Roblin Boulevard and the Assiniboine River to the north, Shaftesbury Boulevard to the east, Wilkes Avenue to the south, and the Perimeter Highway to the west.

Historically, the region was known for "The Passage," a ford across the Assiniboine River that served as an essential route for Indigenous and Métis traders and settlers. In 1869, the area was ceded by the Hudson's Bay Company to Canada, becoming a focal point for European settlement. Charleswood was incorporated as a Rural Municipality in 1913 and maintained its independence until 1972, when it was merged with the City of Winnipeg during the city's amalgamation. Since the 1930s, Charleswood has been recognized as "The Suburb Beautiful."

Today, Charleswood is part of the city ward of Charleswood-Tuxedo-Westwood; and is situated within the provincial electoral district of Roblin (formerly the Charleswood electoral district). The community is also served by the Pembina Trails School Division.

== Etymology ==
The origin of the name "Charleswood" is unclear, as it has at least two possibilities: it may have been named for Charles Kelly, who served on the first municipal council and was the son of early settler Patrick Kelly; or it is a combination of the Parish name "St. Charles" and the dense woodland that encompassed the area. Charleswood was briefly named Kelheau after Kelly.

== History ==
Federal census population history of Charleswood
Year	Pop.	±%
1871	385	—
1881	400	+3.9%
1891	300	−25.0%
1901	450	+50.0%
1906	569	+26.4%
1911	701	+23.2%
1916	766	+9.3%
1921	869	+13.4%
1926	971	+11.7%
1931	1,226	+26.3%
1936	1,515	+23.6%
1941	1,934	+27.7%
1946	2,688	+39.0%
1951	3,860	+43.6%
1956	4,982	+29.1%
1961	6,243	+25.3%
1966	7,373	+18.1%
1971	12,180	+65.2%
Source: Statistics Canada

Indigenous peoples have inhabited the region that is now Charleswood for at least 3,000 years. The area is home to a natural ford known as "the Passage". This was a part of the Assiniboine River that was shallow enough for people and animals to cross safely. The ford was used by American bison for thousands of years. By the 19th century, it had become the main crossing for Indigenous and Métis traders, Red River Settlers travelling to Pembina, and independent traders looking to bypass the Hudson's Bay Company at the Forks. This attracted Métis and later Red River Settlers, and was the site of Kuypers’ farm

When the Hudson's Bay Company ceded Rupert's Land to Canada in 1869, the regions south of the Assiniboine River were incorporated for further European settlement as the Rural Municipality of Assiniboia. This new R.M. combined the Parishes of Headingley, St. Charles, St. James, and a portion of St. Boniface. In 1899, a highway, now Roblin Boulevard, was surveyed along the south side of the Assiniboine River

Patrick H. Kelly (1847–1940) is widely regarded as the founder of what is now Charleswood. He was a farmer and municipal official who moved from Perth County, Ontario, in 1906 and settled in the then-Rural Municipality of Assiniboia, taking over 500 acres (2.0 km^{2}) of land. He built a general store in 1907; was key in establishing the community's first post office; and was instrumental in developing the community's school. He also convinced the Winnipeg Electric Railway Company to extend the street railway so that the community had a connection with the City of Winnipeg.

Kelly eventually came to persuade residents of the community to apply for the creation of Charleswood as a separate municipality. Kelly was successful and the Rural Municipality of Charleswood was incorporated on 15 February 1913. The municipality was formed from parts of the R.M. of Assiniboia and Parishes of Headingley and St. Charles, while excluding territories held by the Town of Tuxedo and the City of Winnipeg. The first four meetings of the new municipal council were held in a room in his store.

During the 1910s, the area was marketed as "Rydal", a prospective residential locale by the developers of Tuxedo. There was little housing in Charleswood before 1920 and only limited growth between 1920 and 1946. The local economy at the time was chiefly agricultural with dairy and poultry farms, market gardens, and mink ranchers. Following World War II, it became popular with European immigrants who wanted to avoid living too close to the centre of Winnipeg. Development of the area increased, and new houses were constructed in the Roblin Park, Marlton, and Varsity View neighbourhoods. A ferry service was in operation in the region as late as 1958, and a trail leading to the ford was visible until fairly recently. The area experienced particularly strong growth in the 1970s, with at least 7,500 homes built during that decade.

Map showing the former boundaries of the R.M. of Charleswood.

In 1972, the Rural Municipality of Charleswood was among several municipalities that amalgamated into the City of Winnipeg. With Headingley seceding in 1992, the former municipalities on the north and south sides of the Assiniboine River—Charleswood and St. James-Assiniboia, respectively—were reunited as the Assiniboia Community. In 1995, the Charleswood Bridge opened over the Assiniboine River, physically connecting the two communities.

=== Varsity View ===
Varsity View (49°51′48″N 97°15′29″W) is one of the original neighbourhoods of Charleswood and also a part of the Assiniboine South neighbourhood cluster. In 1946, there were fewer than a hundred houses in the neighbourhood, which was mostly forest and farm fields. The bulk of the construction took place after the city of Winnipeg amalgamated with the surrounding municipalities. From 1971 to 1980, nearly 390 homes were built, accounting for 35% of the total housing stock in community.

=== Roblin Park ===
Charleswood, Winnipeg
- Neighbourhood
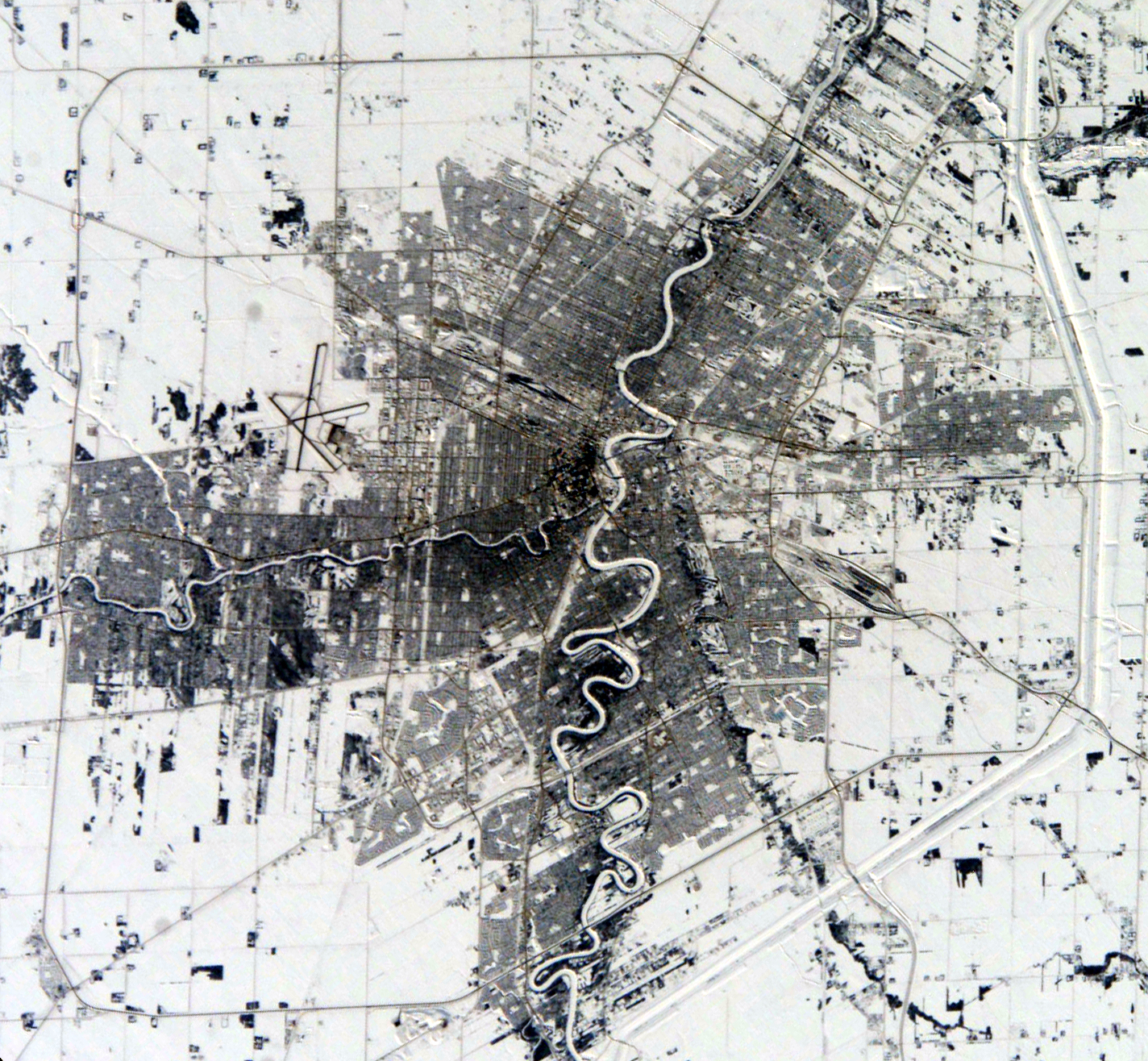
- Location within Winnipeg
- Coordinates: 49°51′10″N 97°17′21″W
- Country: Canada
- Province: Manitoba
- City: Winnipeg
- Area: Charleswood
- Initial Settlement: 1912
- Veterans Settlement Plan: 1946
- Founder: Veterans' Land Act

Population
  - Total: 945
  - Density: 1.35/km^{2} (3.5/sq mi)
- Architect: Moody and Moore
- Builder: Bird Construction Ltd.

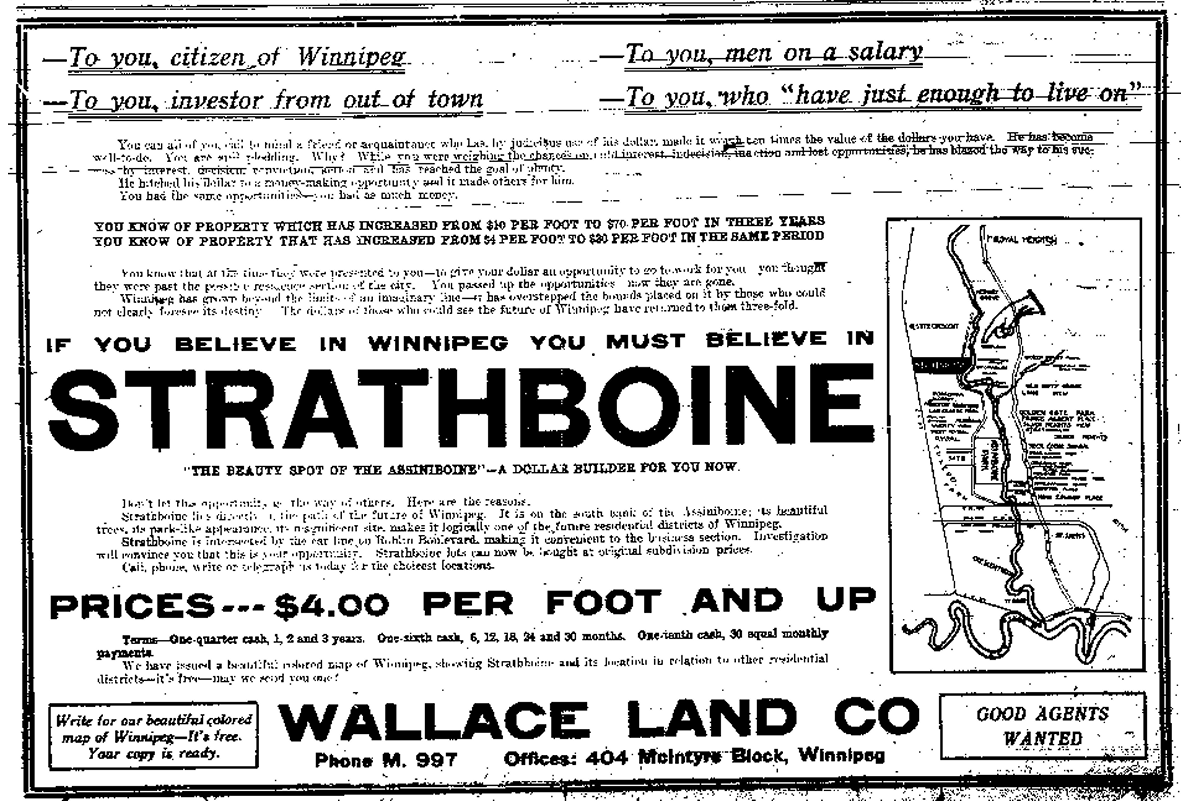
Advertisement for Strathboine Development

Roblin Park (49°51′09″N 97°17′21″W) is one of the original neighbourhoods of Charleswood, and is also part of the Assiniboine South Neighbourhood Cluster It is bounded by Roblin Boulevard to the North, Hartestone Road to the East, bisects the Harte Trail to the south and Scotswood Drive to the West.

The area was originally named Strathboine, and was slated for development in 1912. However the initial development failed to attract residents due to its remoteness and the collapse of development.

The failed settlement was purchased by the Veterans Land Act in 1945. Roblin Park was set up as a housing development for Veterans in the mid-1940s.

In 1946, Joseph and Violet Reynolds became the first to move into Roblin Park, at 105 (now 605) Pepperloaf Crescent.

== Points of interest ==
The Assiniboine Forest is a 700-acre forest in Charleswood and hosts 18 km of walking paths, which connect to Assiniboine Park and to the Harte Trail. The Harte Trail is a 6.5 km multi-use trail that follows an old railway, and forms a part of the Trans Canada Trail.

There are two designated historical structures in Charleswood. Located in Caron Park, Caron House is one of the last remaining original farmhouses in Charleswood. Odd Fellows Home is a building originally built as a home for elderly members of the Independent Order of Odd Fellows and their spouses, as well as orphanage for children of deceased members. Charleswood's former Municipal Hall has also been converted to the Charleswood Community Museum.

== Sports ==
Charleswood is home to the Charleswood Hawks hockey team playing out of the MMJHL. It is also home to the Charleswood Curling Club, home club of 6 time provincial, 2 times national, and 1996 world curling champion Jeff Stoughton.

Team	Founded	League	Arena	Championships
Charleswood Hawks	1970	MMJHL	Eric Coy Arena	12

Roblin Park has an outdoor hockey rink.

== Amenities ==
Roblin Park is home to the Roblin Park Community Centre. It also covers a portion of the Harte Trail; a multi-use trail that is part of the Trans-Canada Trail.

== Education ==
Charleswood is served by Ward 1 of the Pembina Trails School Division.

It has 9 elementary schools: Pacific Junction School, Royal School, École Charleswood School, École Dieppe, Beaumont School, Beaverlodge School, Westdale School, Westgrove School and River West Park School. It has one secondary school, École secondaire Oak Park High School.

Charleswood is host to the main campus of Canadian Mennonite University, which includes the former Manitoba School for the Deaf.

== Transportation ==
Charleswood is served by the 98, 95, 79, 67, 66, 65 and 18 Winnipeg Transit buses.

== Demographics ==
In 2006, the population of Varsity View was 2,600 people. The area is 92.5% White, 4.4% Aboriginal and 3.1% is made up of visible minorities. Varsity View is a middle-class neighbourhood, with a median household income of $60,206, which is a bit higher than the cities at $49,790. There are 1,150 dwellings, 70.9% which are owned and the average dwelling is worth $185,484. 7% of these dwellings are in need of major repairs.

Roblin Park is predominantly white, middle class and anglophone. According to the 2016 Census, the neighbourhood is 89.5% Anglophone. The neighbourhood is majority white, with the largest non-white ethnic groups being Indigenous or Metis (7.4%) and the remaining 4.2% of residents belonging to other visible minorities. The average income of the neighbourhood is $58,661, higher than the city average of $44,915.

== Crime ==
Charleswood has very low crime rates. The table below shows the crime rates of various crimes in each of the Charleswood neighbourhoods. The crime data spans 5 years from the year 2017 to the year 2021. The rates are crimes per 100,000 residents per year.

Crime Rates per 100,000 people in Charleswood Neighborhoods, 2017-2021
Neighborhood	Pop.	Homicide	Rate (Note: Rate per 100,000 people per year: Figure is calculated by dividing the total incidents of a crime by the neighborhood population, then multiplying by 100,000, and then dividing by 5, as the data spans 5 years)	Robbery	Rate	Agr. Aslt. (Note: Aggravated assault: Includes assaults which cause bodily harm or utilize weapons; includes the following categories given on Winnipeg CrimeMaps: aggravated assault, aggravated sexual assault, assault against peace officer, assault with weapon or causing bodily harm, attempted murder, firearms offences, sexual assault with a weapon.)	Rate	Cmn. Aslt. (Note: Common assault: Excludes assaults which cause bodily harm or utilize weapons; includes the following categories given on Winnipeg CrimeMaps: assault against peace officer, common assault, other assaults, sexual assault.)	Rate	Utt. Threat (Note: Abbreviated from: uttering threats)	Rate	Property	Rate
Betsworth	4,040	0	0.0	1	5.0	7	34.7	17	84.2	6	29.7	228	1,128.7
Elmhurst	4,400	0	0.0	5	22.7	5	22.7	24	109.1	7	31.8	474	2,154.5
Eric Coy	2,440	1	8.2	2	16.4	4	32.8	12	98.4	5	41.0	154	1,262.3
Marlton	635	0	0.0	0	0.0	0	0.0	6	189.0	1	31.5	70	2,204.7
Ridgedale	715	0	0.0		0.0	5	139.9	1	28.0	0	0.0	46	1,286.7
Ridgewood South	190	0	0.0	0	0.0	4	421.1	5	526.3	3	315.8	102	10,736.8
River West Park	1,480	0	0.0	2	27.0	3	40.5	8	108.1	9	121.6	109	1,473.0
Roblin Park	945	0	0.0	2	42.3	6	127.0	6	127.0	0	0.0	105	2,222.2
Southboine	1,360	0	0.0	0	0.0	1	14.7	11	161.8	4	58.8	113	1,661.8
Varsity View	2,685	0	0.0	2	14.9	12	89.4	12	89.4	7	52.1	277	2,063.3
Vialoux	950	0	0.0	6	126.3	23	484.2	42	884.2	19	400.0	177	3,726.3
Westdale	4,540	0	0.0	33	145.4	31	136.6	84	370.0	23	101.3	707	3,114.5
Wilkes South	610	0	0.0	0	0.0	3	98.4	9	295.1	0	0.0	115	3,770.5
Charleswood	24,990	1	0.8	53	42.4	104	83.2	237	189.7	84	67.2	2,677	2,142.5

== Notable people ==
- Brian Bowman, Mayor of Winnipeg 2014–2022
- William Ralph (Bill) Clement (June 3, 1948 – May 3, 2010), Winnipeg City Council 1983–2010, Deputy Mayor of Winnipeg 1993

== See also ==
- List of rural municipalities in Manitoba
- Subdivisions of Winnipeg
- List of Neighbourhoods in Winnipeg
