= Shaftesbury High School =

Location
- 2240 Grant Ave. Winnipeg Metro Region; Winnipeg, Manitoba, R3P 0P7; Canada; 49.8571°N 97.2296°W

Information
- School type: High school
- Motto: As stewards of our communities, we lead and contribute with excellence, imagination and drive
- Established: 1968
- School district: Pembina Trails School Division
- Superintendent: Shelley Amos
- Principal: Mike Weekes
- Grades: 9-12
- Enrollment: 814 (2024)
- International students: 40
- Language: English
- Colours: Red, White & Blue
- Team name: Titans
- Communities served: Tuxedo, Charleswood
- Website: www.pembinatrails.ca/shaftesbury

Shaftesbury High School is a public high school located in the Tuxedo neighbourhood of Winnipeg, Manitoba, Canada. It has a population of over 750 students from Tuxedo, Charleswood, and Linden Woods. They are included in the Pembina Trails School Division's International Student Program (ISP) and recently acquired the RHA Nationals Boys Hockey Team. Shaftesbury High School is the only high school within the Pembina Trails School Division that cooks food on the spot for students.

The school opened in September 1968.

== International Student Program ==
Shaftesbury High participates in the Pembina Trails School Division (PTSD) International student Program (ISP). Typically they host up to international 40 students.

== Scholarships and awards ==
Various awards and scholarships are available at Shaftesbury High School. These awards are certified by universities and the PTSD.

- Pembina Trails School Division Academic Award of Excellence
- Pembina Trails School Division Citizenship Awards
- Chown Centennial Scholarship
- Shaftesbury Titans Award
- Governor General's Award

(Note: Awards are exact names of the award handed out yearly)

== Graduation requirements ==
The Manitoba Government requires students to meet these requirements in order to graduate.

- Minimum 30 Credits
- Completed All Compulsory Courses
- Minimum one Grade 11 Optional course credit and two Grade 12 Optional course credits.

== Sports ==
The school competes in the following sports.

- Badminton
- Basketball (females and males)
- Bowling (females and males)
- Cross country running
- Curling
- Golf
- Hockey (females and males)
- Rugby (females and males)
- Soccer (indoor and outdoor, females and males)
- Track and field (indoor, outdoor, and Manitoba Marathon)
- Ultimate Frisbee
- Volleyball (females and males)

=== Hockey teams and programs ===
Shaftesbury offers a wide variety of hockey. There is a hockey skills academy run by Hockey Canada. The boys' hockey team participates in the Winnipeg High School Hockey League (WHSHL). The girls' hockey team participates in the female high school league.

The RHA Nationals Boy Prep team is run by the Rink Hockey Academy. They do not follow the same schedule as normal students would nor do they follow the average hockey player schedule. They typically practice four-five times a week and games taking place on the weekends.

The school also offers a R1 Nationals Prep Female team.

=== Championships won ===
- 2025 – Boys Hockey Winnipeg Free Press Division
- 2024 – Girls Hockey MWHSHL Division I
- 2020 – Boys Hockey Platinum Promotions Division Tier II
- 2019 – Boys Hockey Winnipeg Free Press Division
- 2011 – Boys Indoor Soccer Division B
- 2011 – Boys Hockey Winnipeg Free Press Division
- 2011 – Girls Junior Varsity Tier 2 Basketball
- 2010 – Boys Varsity Basketball Division 2
- 2010 – Girls Varsity Tier 2 Basketball

== Notable alumni ==
- Madison Bowey – Professional Hockey player for the Vancouver Canucks and Stanley Cup Champion with the Washington Capitals in 2018.
- Brian Bowman – 43rd Mayor of Winnipeg
- Cody Eakin – Professional hockey player for the Buffalo Sabres
- Steven Fletcher – Politician
- Scott Glennie – Former professional ice hockey player
- Seth Jarvis – Professional hockey player for the Carolina Hurricanes 2026 Stanley Cup Champion, 2026 Olympic Silver Medalist with Team Canada
- Kaitlyn Lawes – Curler – Gold medalist with Team Canada, 2014 Sochi Olympic games
- Todd MacCulloch – Former NBA center for the Philadelphia 76ers and the New Jersey Nets
- Sara Orlesky – TSN news reporter
- Leanne Spencer – Supermodel of the World Titleholder of 1996
- Nia Vardalos – Actress
