= Vincent Massey Collegiate =

Vincent Massey Collegiate may refer to one of several schools in Canada named for Vincent Massey, the 18th Governor General of Canada:

- Vincent Massey Collegiate (Montreal), a high school in Montreal, Quebec
- Institut collegial Vincent Massey Collegiate, a senior high school in Winnipeg, Manitoba
- Vincent Massey Collegiate Institute, now Vincent Massey Secondary School, a secondary school in Windsor, Ontario
- Vincent Massey Collegiate Institute, a former secondary school in Etobicoke, Ontario (now a part of Toronto)
- Vincent Massey is a high school in Brandon, Manitoba
