= Assiniboine Forest =

Park in Winnipeg, Canada

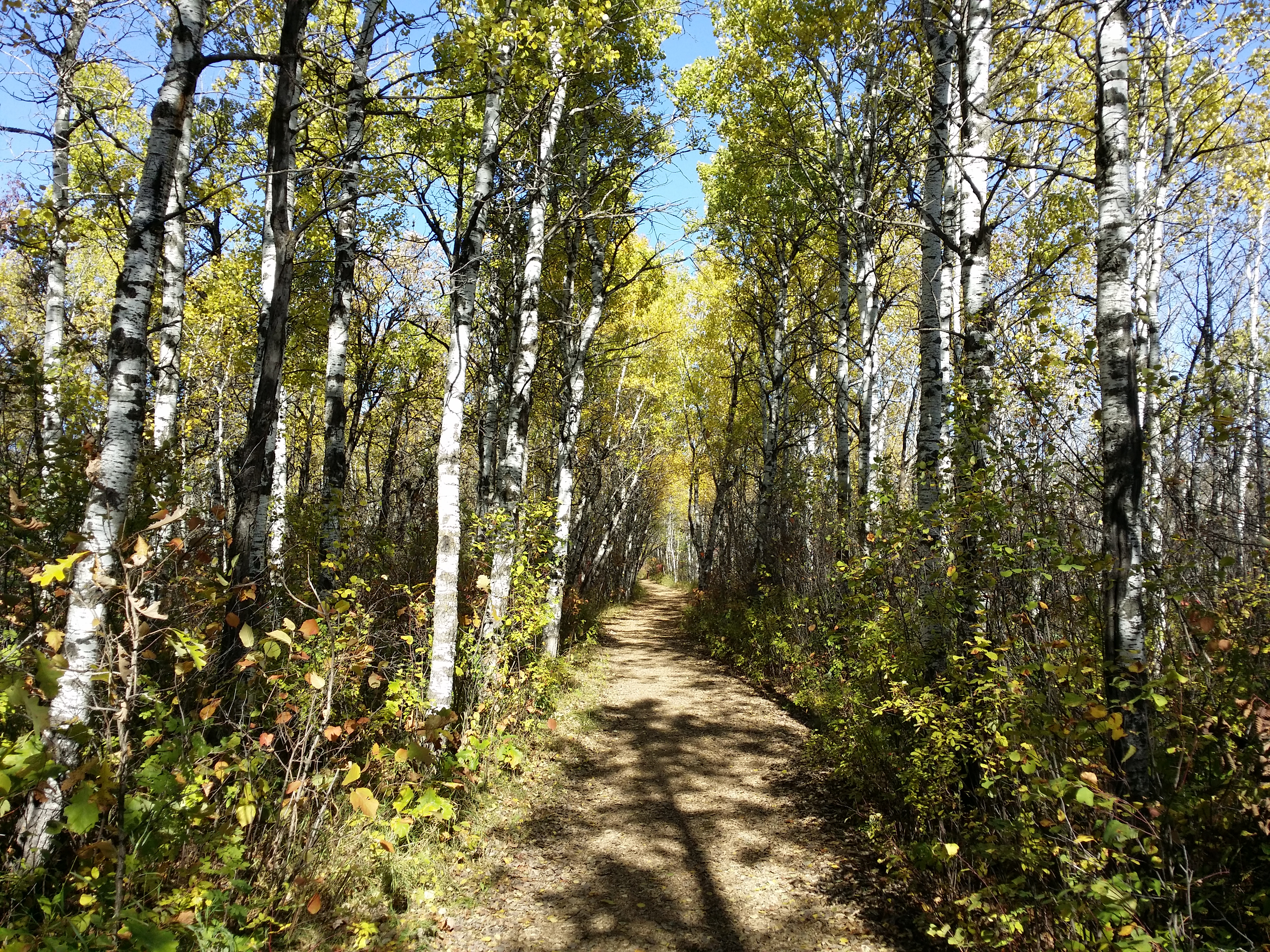
- The Aspen trail in Assiniboine Forest
- Interactive map of Assiniboine Forest
- Location: Winnipeg, Manitoba
- Coordinates: 49°52′N 97°14′W
- Area: 285 hectares (700 acres)
- Opened: 1973
- Public transit: Winnipeg Transit; FX3 D19 70 664

Assiniboine Forest is a regional park in Winnipeg, Manitoba and the largest urban forest in Canada, comprising an area of over 285 hectares. It's located within the suburban area of Charleswood and is surrounded by Roblin Blvd, Chalfont Road, Wilkes Avenue, and Shaftesbury Boulevard.

The Forest consists of old growth aspen and oak trees, as well as wetlands; open meadows of tall-grass prairie; and a 12-acre pond. These habitats collectively include various species of plants and animals, including a resident population of white-tailed deer and nesting waterfowl. The Forest also contains 18 kilometres of maintained (paved, woodchip, and crushed limestone) multi-use trails that are accessed year-round by walkers; runners; cyclists; and in the winter; cross-country skiers. A surrounding system of paved trails connects these pathways northward to Assiniboine Park and southward to the Harte Trail.

Since 1990, the Assiniboine Forest has been maintained by the Winnipeg Charleswood Rotary Club.

== History ==
The Assiniboine Forest was originally going to be razed as part of a suburban development of what was originally the Town of Tuxedo. By 1920, a development plan was in place and road cuts were made. However, due to the stock market crash of 1929 and subsequent economic depression, plans for its development were stopped.

In the 1960s, local residents and City of Winnipeg Councillor Bernie R. Wolfe became interested in protecting the forest and the wildlife within. Although the Town of Tuxedo was not interested in this idea, it joined the City of Winnipeg in 1971, making the possibility of preserving the Forest more likely.

In 1973, after persistent efforts by individuals and concerned citizen groups, particularly the Assiniboine Park Centennial Committee, Assiniboine Forest was preserved as a municipal nature park.

Today, the Charleswood Rotary Club acts as the Forest's custodian, maintaining and increasing the Forest's amenities for city residents.https://www.assiniboineforest.ca

== See also ==
- Assiniboine Park
