= Fort Richmond Collegiate =

Location
- 99 Killarney Avenue; Winnipeg, Manitoba, R3T 3B3; Canada; 49.791485°N 97.152712°W

Information
- Type: High school
- Established: 1967; 59 years ago
- School board: Pembina Trails School Division
- Superintendent: Ted Fransen
- Principal: Stan Hall
- Grades: 9-12
- Enrollment: 1397 (2024)
- Team name: Centurions
- Website: www.pembinatrails.ca/fortrichmond

Fort Richmond Collegiate (Commonly known as FRC or Fort Richmond) is a public high school located in Winnipeg, Manitoba, Canada. Fort Richmond Collegiate is one of 36 schools in the Pembina Trails School Division. The school offers instruction in English, from grades 9–12.

== Achievements ==
- In the school year of 2005–2006, 3 National Scholars out of 16 in Manitoba came from FRC. They achieved a score of 4 or 5 on the 5 point AP grading scale on a minimum of 5 AP exams.
- In 2008, 63 students received a Centurion Pin. These pins are handed out to students who participated in at least 240 hours of extra curricular activities.
- Both the Concert Band and Jazz Band have participated in the MusicFest Canada Festival (one of the 2 Canadian national level festivals) every year for the past 45 years.
- The Senior Improv Team made Provincial Finals at the Manitoba Improv League. Four FRC students were invited to perform at Rainbow Stage's Musical "Strike".
- Out of 6500 students who participated in the University of Toronto National Biology Competition, two students from FRC were placed 2nd and 7th. FRC placed 3rd in the Competition out of over 450 schools across Canada.
- 1991/92 - Fort Richmond Centurions boys hockey team won the 1st ever MHSAA provincial hockey championship
- in 2019/20 - Fort Richmond Centurions Boys hockey team won their 2nd MHSAA hockey championship

== Notable alumni ==
- Arash Abizadeh
- Chimwemwe Undi
- Taylor Wilson (volleyball)
