= Little Italy, Winnipeg =

Little Italy Corydon Village
- Neighbourhood
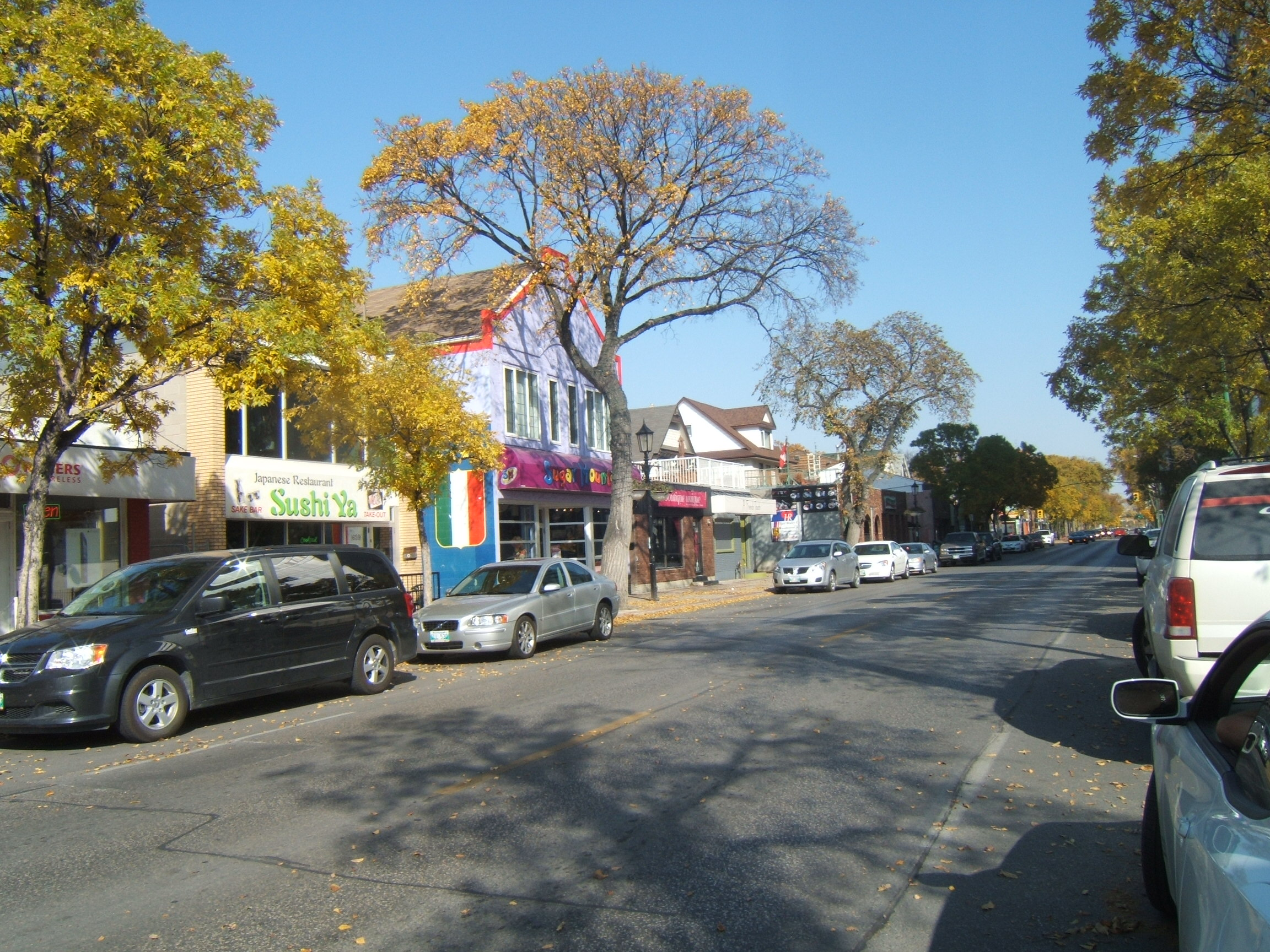
- Corydon Avenue in Little Italy
- Nickname: Corydon Village
- Interactive map of Little Italy
- Coordinates: 49.8716°N 97.1506°W
- Country: Canada
- Province: Manitoba
- City: Winnipeg
- Established: 1991
- Postal code: R3L
- Area codes: 204, 431
- Website: www.corydonbiz.com

Little Italy, also known as Corydon Village, is a neighbourhood in Winnipeg, Manitoba, Canada. It is located on Corydon Avenue between Stafford Street on the west, and Pembina Highway on the east. The district has many boutiques and restaurants.

== Background ==
There are a variety of Italian businesses in the Little Italy/Corydon Village neighbourhood, including small cafes, Mediterranean restaurants, ice cream/gelato parlours, beauty salons, and offices. Also there are a variety of small and medium-sized apartments and condominium buildings both on Corydon Avenue and nearby streets.

During the summer months on weekend evenings some north-south streets are closed off to make way for live entertainment.

In the early 2010s, the representatives of the city met with residents and stakeholders to plan the neighbourhood's future development. The Corydon-Osborne Area Plan was released in 2014 with community consultation going on during the decade. It was adopted by Council in 2017.

The term "Little Italy" has become less common due to the closure of some Italian restaurants, and an influx of new non-Italian restaurants and shops. Today, many residents of Winnipeg mainly refer to the area as the "Corydon Village."
