= Corydon Partlow Brown =

Canadian politician

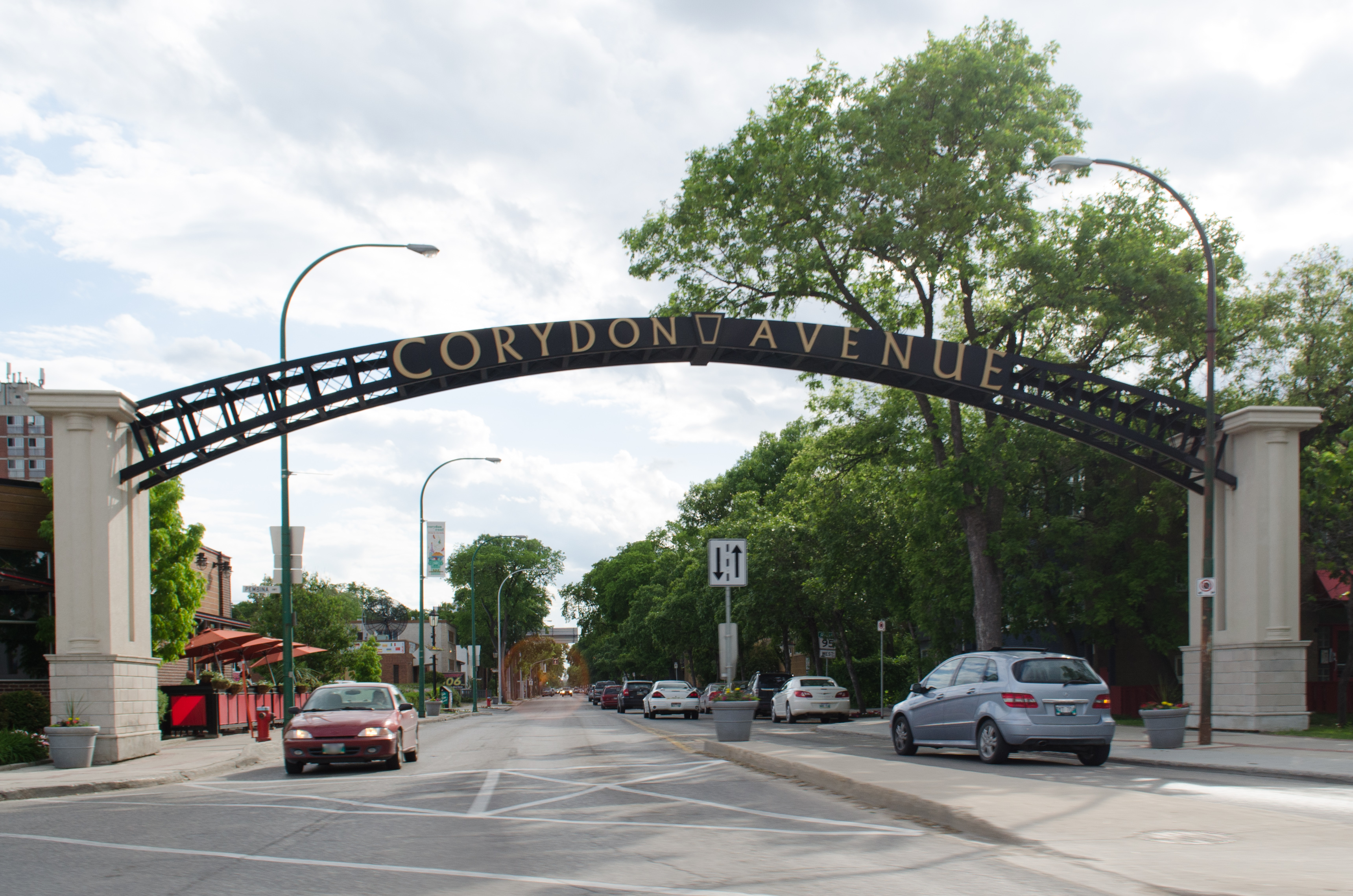
Corydon Avenue in Winnipeg, Manitoba was named for Corydon Partlow Brown

Corydon Partlow Brown (November 14, 1848 – December 17, 1891) was a Canadian politician. He was a member of the Legislative Assembly of Manitoba and a member of the provincial cabinet under Premier John Norquay.

Brown was born in Southampton, New Brunswick in 1848, training as a civil engineer before moving west and homesteading 320 acres (two quarter-sections) in the area of what is now Gladstone, Manitoba. He worked as a surveyor, then opened a number of businesses and became a railroad director. In 1874 he ran for the Legislative Assembly of Manitoba in the riding of Westbourne. Following his election he found himself allied with Norquay, a non-partisan moderate. When Norquay became premier of a coalition government in 1878, Brown was offered a cabinet position as Provincial Secretary; two years later, he was named Minister of Public Works.

One of Brown's most important tasks during his time at Public Works was to convince the serving prime minister of Canada, Sir John A. Macdonald, that the future of Manitoba depended on the issuing of railway charters (disallowed by Ottawa). He also presided over the construction of roads and the drainage of much of Manitoba's swampland. His duties were hampered by attacks by Liberal partisans and the Winnipeg Free Press, both of which called him a "boodle politician", and by lack of support on the part of Norquay and his other allies. Brown was eventually demoted back to Provincial Secretary before retiring from the cabinet. In 1888, he failed to secure the nomination for Westbourne for the Conservative party. He died in Winnipeg in 1891 at the age of 43 of pneumonia.

Brown was married twice, first to Emma Davidson of Gladstone, then to Jennie Davidson (Emma's younger sister). He had six children.

Corydon Avenue in Winnipeg was named after Corydon Partlow Brown.
