= Winnipeg Route 96 =

City route in Winnipeg

Route 96
- Moray Street; William R. Clement Parkway; Shaftesbury Boulevard
- Route 96 highlighted in red

Route information
- Maintained by City of Winnipeg
- Length: 5.9 km (3.7 mi)
- Existed: 1995–present

Major junctions
- North end: PTH 1 (TCH) / Route 85 (Portage Ave)
- Route 95 (Roblin Blvd); Route 105 (Grant Ave)
- South end: Route 145 (Wilkes Ave)

Location
- Country: Canada
- Province: Manitoba

Highway system
- Provincial highways in Manitoba; Winnipeg City Routes
← Route 95	→ Route 105

Route 96 is a city route in Winnipeg, Manitoba, Canada. The route commences at Portage Avenue (Route 85) and ends at Wilkes Avenue (Route 145).

== Route description ==
Route 96 begins as Moray Street at Portage Avenue and heads south, becoming the William R. Clement Parkway as it reaches the bridge over the Assiniboine River. The Parkway ends at Grant Avenue (Route 105), at which point Route 96 turns east and runs concurrently with Route 105 through the Assiniboine Forest. It turns south again at the Canadian Mennonite University campus and follows Shaftesbury Boulevard to its end at Wilkes Avenue.

== History ==
The Moray Street south extension and Charleswood Bridge, the original part of Route 96, were built in 1995. The William R. Clement Parkway, originally known as the Charleswood Parkway, opened in 2002. The Charleswood Bridge and Parkway were renamed after the late Charleswood city councillor Bill Clement in 2010.

=== Future ===
The City of Winnipeg is currently planning to reroute City Route 96 by extending the William Clement Parkway to Wilkes Avenue. This project was originally expected to be completed by 2016; however, that was put on hold in 2017 pending a new precinct plan by Winnipeg city council.

== Major intersections ==
From north to south. The entire route is in Winnipeg.

Street Name	km	mi	Destinations	Notes
Moray Street	0.0	0.0	Moray Street	Northern continuation
Moray Street	0.0	0.0	PTH 1 (TCH) / Portage Avenue (Route 85) / YH	Route 96 northern terminus
Assiniboine River	0.3– 0.5	0.19– 0.31	Charleswood Bridge Morey Street south end • William R. Clement Parkway north end	
William R. Clement Parkway	0.9	0.56	Roblin Boulevard (Route 95)	
Grant Avenue	1.8	1.1	Grant Avenue (Route 105 west)	Route 42 turns onto Grant Avenue; north end of Route 105 concurrency
Shaftesbury Boulevard	4.5	2.8	Grant Avenue (Route 105 east) / Shaftesbury Boulevard	Route 42 turns onto Shaftesbury Boulevard; south end of Route 105 concurrency
Shaftesbury Boulevard	5.9	3.7	Sterling Lyon Parkway (Route 145)	Route 96 southern terminus
Shaftesbury Boulevard	5.9	3.7	McCreary Road	Southern continuation
1.000 mi = 1.609 km; 1.000 km = 0.621 mi: Concurrency terminus; Route transition
