= Confusion Corner =

Street intersection in Winnipeg, Manitoba, Canada

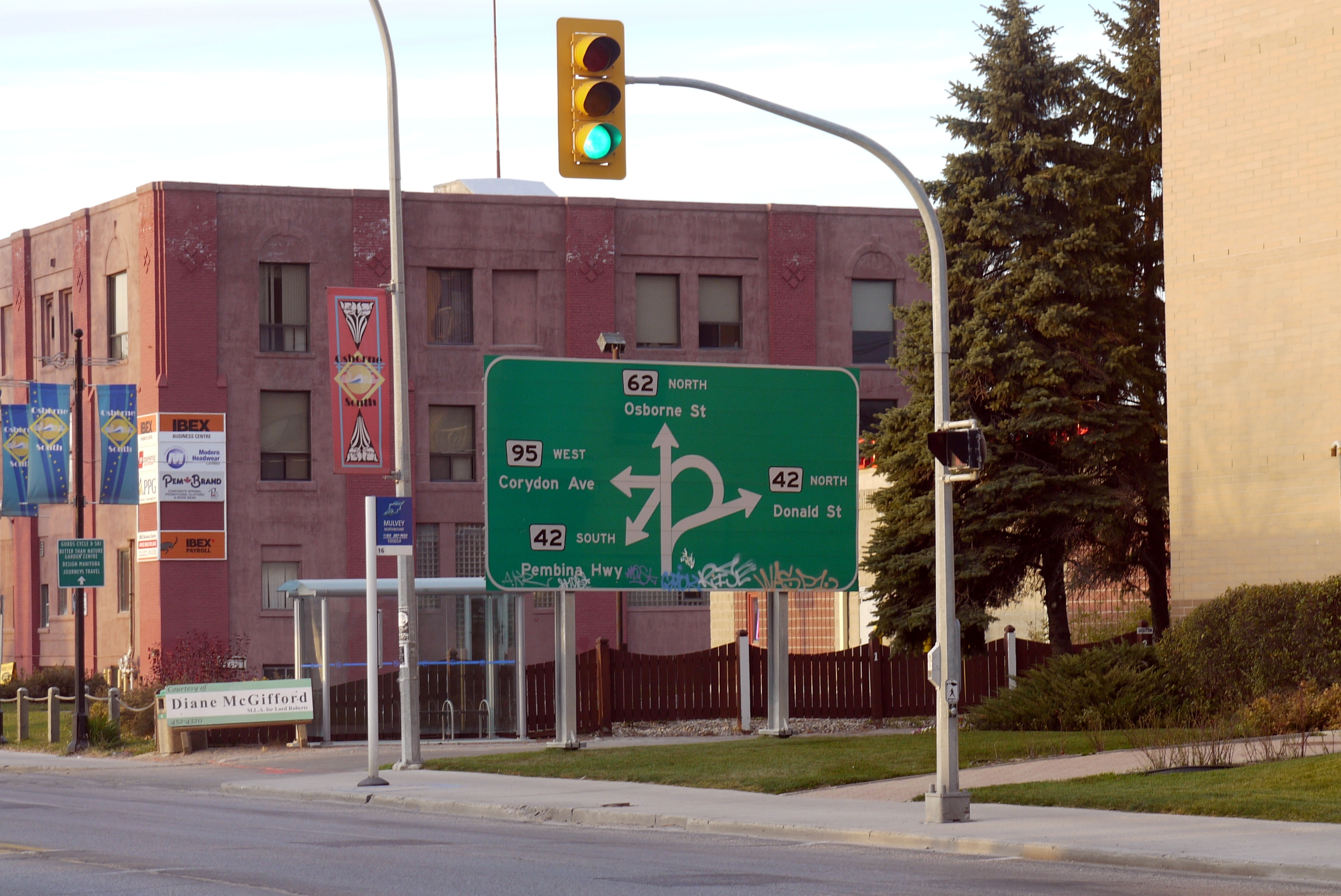
- Road sign for northbound traffic approaching Confusion Corner
- Interactive map of Confusion Corner

Location
- Winnipeg, Manitoba, Canada
- Coordinates: 49.8747°N 97.1425°W
- Roads at junction: Route 42 north (Donald St); Route 42 south (Pembina Hwy); Route 62 (Osborne St); Route 95 west (Corydon Ave)

Construction
- Type: at-grade intersection
- Maintained by: City of Winnipeg Public Works

Osborne Junction, more commonly known as Confusion Corner, is a street intersection in Winnipeg, Manitoba. Located at the junction of City Route 62 and City Route 42 in the city's Fort Rouge neighbourhood, the intersection is a major traffic hub through which most traffic between downtown and the southwest quadrant of the city must pass, but is infamous for being complex and difficult for unfamiliar or distracted drivers to navigate correctly.

The intersection is defined by two one-way segments of Route 42, which has the street names Pembina Highway west of the intersection, and Donald Street and McMillan Avenue east of the intersection, intersecting Route 62 (Osborne Street) in a rhomboid shape. City Route 95 (Corydon Avenue) does not directly enter the junction of the two routes, instead beginning at the southwestern corner of the rhomboid, although traffic to and from the terminus of Corydon Avenue also funnels through the junction.

An interchange for the Osborne-Pembina-Corydon intersection was proposed by the Metro Winnipeg council during the 1960s, however this was abandoned due to the high cost.

== Traffic flow ==
=== Route 42 ===
Southbound traffic on Route 42 enters the intersection along McMillan Avenue, a one-way westbound street which begins at the northeast corner of the rhomboid, taking southbound traffic from Donald Street. At the intersection with Route 62, the main traffic lanes lead onto Pembina Highway southbound; however, traffic in the rightmost lane can also switch onto a short cul-de-sac segment of McMillan Avenue.

Northbound traffic on Route 42 must filter into one of three lanes. The leftmost lane, which is separated from the other two by a median strip, instead merges with an eastbound lane coming from Corydon Avenue. Traffic in this lane may head straight through the intersection onto Donald or may turn north onto Osborne; traffic in the other two lanes may head straight through the intersection or turn south onto Osborne.

The triangle created by the separation of Pembina Highway's northbound and southbound lanes at Osborne is also bisected by a dedicated lane reserved for Winnipeg Transit buses. The rightmost lane of Osborne along the side of the triangle is also reserved for buses; in 2007, the city of Winnipeg repaved the bus-only lanes in a different colour of pavement than the rest of the roadway.

=== Route 62 ===
Southbound traffic on Osborne Street must use the McMillan/Pembina intersection to turn west onto Corydon Avenue or south onto Pembina Highway, and the Donald/Pembina intersection to turn east onto Donald Street.

Northbound traffic on Osborne must turn right onto Donald to access any of the cross streets, and drivers seeking to head west on Corydon or south on Pembina must then loop back along McMillan. Northbound cars cannot turn directly onto Pembina at the McMillan/Pembina intersection. Drivers approaching the intersection from this direction see the intersection's most iconic traffic sign.

=== Route 95 ===
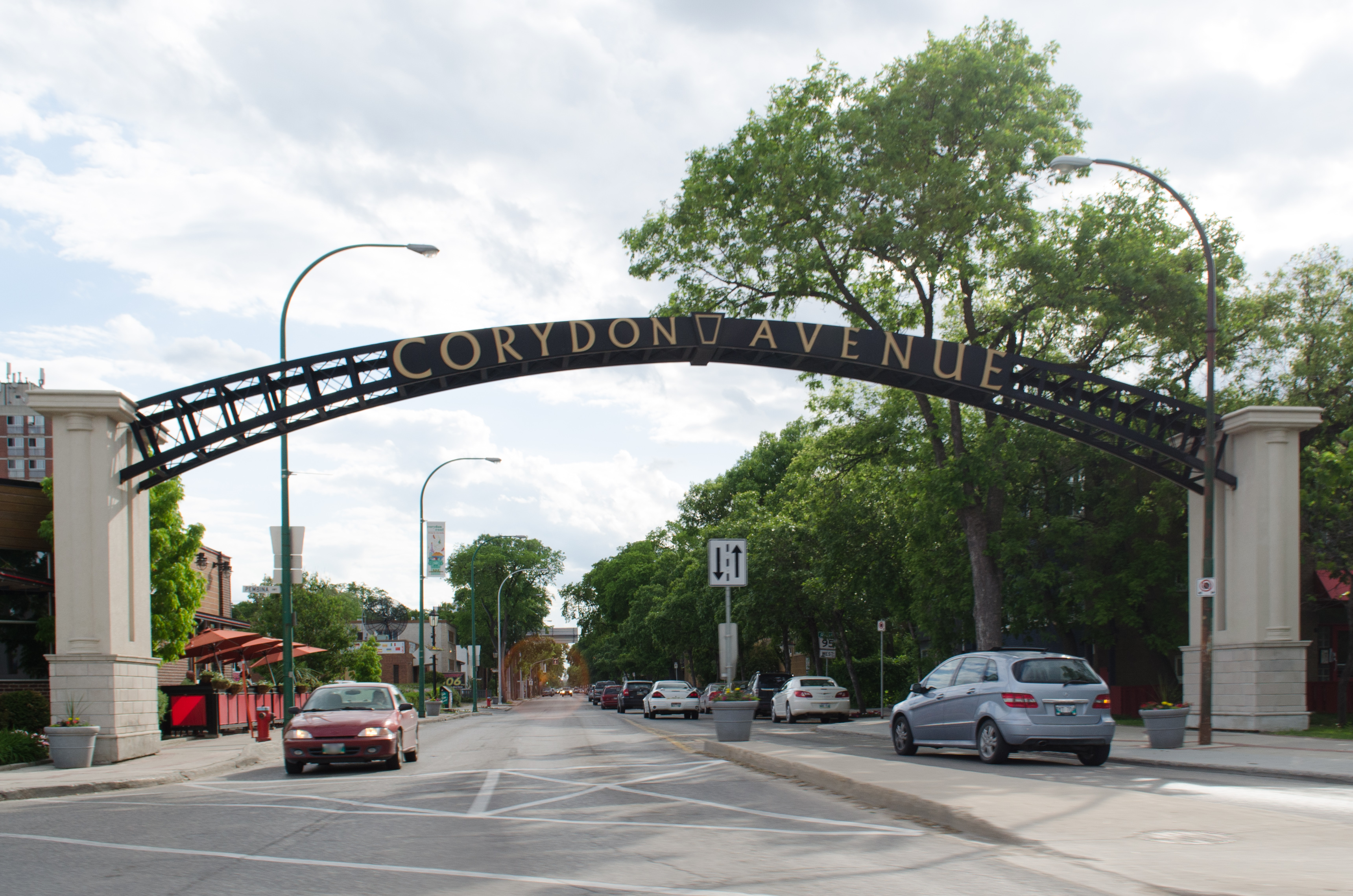
Corydon Avenue arch

Westbound traffic entering Corydon Avenue from any direction must use the McMillan/Pembina intersection, inclusive of the Donald/McMillan loop if necessary, and then turn onto Corydon. Eastbound traffic coming off Corydon may travel southbound onto Pembina, north onto Osborne or through the intersection. However, due to the median separating Pembina's northbound turning lane from its other lanes, this traffic cannot access the lanes which are permitted to turn southbound onto Osborne; a driver who wishes to make this turn must either take the Donald/McMillan loop or turn southbound onto Pembina and take a Michigan left via Jessie Street to return to Pembina's other set of northbound lanes.

== Neighbourhood ==
The larger neighbourhood surrounding the intersection to the west is officially called Little Italy, although the Confusion Corner nickname may also be extended to it. The area north of the intersection is called Osborne Village, the highest-density neighbourhood in Winnipeg. South of the intersection are the South Osborne, Riverview, and Lord Roberts neighbourhoods. Heading east from the intersection takes you to Downtown Winnipeg.

A restaurant located on Corydon Avenue, on the southwest corner of the junction, is named Confusion Corner Drinks & Food.

== Popular culture ==
The intersection is referenced in The Weakerthans' song "Civil Twilight", from their 2007 album Reunion Tour. The song is written from the perspective of a Winnipeg Transit driver.

The television series Less Than Kind, set in Winnipeg, based its title logo on the sign approaching the intersection northbound along Osborne Street.
