= Winnipeg Route 95 =

City route in Winnipeg, Manitoba, Canada

Route 95
- Roblin Boulevard; Corydon Avenue
- Route 95 highlighted in red
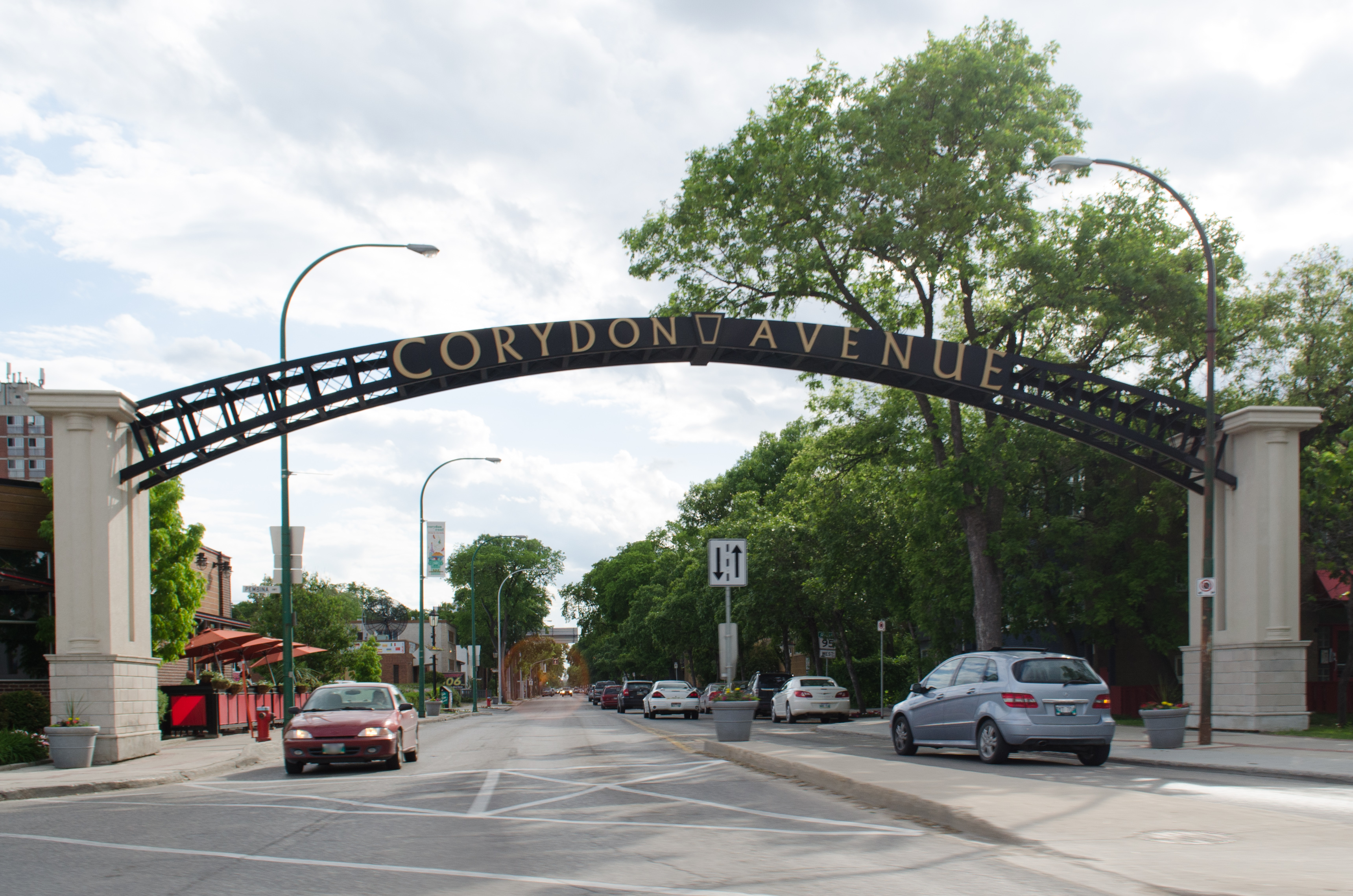
- Corydon Avenue arch near Confusion Corner

Route information
- Maintained by City of Winnipeg
- Length: 10.8 km (6.7 mi)
- Existed: 1966–present
- Known for: Confusion Corner, Little Italy

Major junctions
- West end: Route 105 (Grant Ave)
- Route 96 (W.R. Clement Pkwy); Route 90 (Kenaston Blvd); Route 70 (Stafford St)
- East end: Route 42 (Pembina Highway) / Route 62 (Osborne Street)

Location
- Country: Canada
- Province: Manitoba

Highway system
- Provincial highways in Manitoba; Winnipeg City Routes
← Route 90	→ Route 96

Route 95 is a city route located in Winnipeg, Manitoba, Canada. It runs in the southwest part of the city from Route 105 east to Route 42, near the Confusion Corner intersection. It is named Roblin Boulevard west of Assiniboine Park, where it then becomes Corydon Avenue for the remainder of its route.

== Corydon and Roblin ==
The Corydon Avenue segment of the route is home to Winnipeg's Little Italy District, and is, as of June 29, 2025, served by the D19 Corydon Winnipeg Transit bus route. The avenue was named after Corydon Partlow Brown, a member of the Legislative Assembly of Manitoba from 1878 to 1888.

The more westerly Roblin Boulevard segment serves as the main street for the area of Charleswood. It was named for former Manitoba premier Rodmond Roblin, grandfather of Duff Roblin.

== Major intersections ==
From west to east, all intersections are at-grade unless otherwise indicated. The entire route is in Winnipeg.

Street Name	km	mi	Destinations	Notes
Roblin Boulevard	0.00	0.00	Roblin Boulevard / Grant Avenue (Route 105)	Route 95 western terminus
Roblin Boulevard	1.55	0.96	William R. Clement Parkway (Route 96)	
Roblin Boulevard	1.79	1.11	Alcrest Drive	
Roblin Boulevard	4.15	2.58	Conservatory Drive / Shaftesbury Boulevard	Access to Assiniboine Park; Roblin Boulevard east end; Corydon Avenue west end
Corydon Avenue	5.15	3.20	Tuxedo Avenue	
Corydon Avenue	5.94	3.69	Kenaston Boulevard (Route 90)	
Corydon Avenue	7.96	4.95	Waverley Street	One-way southbound
Corydon Avenue	8.17	5.08	Cambridge Street	
Corydon Avenue	8.19	5.09	East end of divided section	
Corydon Avenue	8.79	5.46	Wilton Street	
Corydon Avenue	9.13	5.67	Harrow Street	
Corydon Avenue	9.30	5.78	Stafford Street (Route 70)	
Corydon Avenue	9.65	6.00	Lilac Street	
Corydon Avenue	10.34	6.42	Daly Street	
Corydon Avenue	10.79– 10.87	6.70– 6.75	Pembina Highway (Route 42); Osborne Street (Route 62)	Confusion Corner; Route 95 eastern terminus
1.000 mi = 1.609 km; 1.000 km = 0.621 mi: Closed/former; Incomplete access; Route transition
