= Institut collegial Vincent Massey Collegiate =

Institut Collégial Vincent Massey Collegiate

Location
- 975 Dowker Avenue; Winnipeg, Manitoba, R3T 1R7; Canada; 49.8399°N 97.1503°W

Information
- School type: Public
- Founded: 1960
- School board: Pembina Trails School Division
- Principal: Sharon Labossiere
- Grades: 9-12
- Enrollment: 4167 (2024)
- Language: English and French
- Campus: Suburban
- Area: Fort Garry
- Colours: Green and Black
- Mascot: Troy The Trojan
- Team name: Massey Trojans
- Website: www.pembinatrails.ca/vincentmassey/

Vincent Massey Collegiate (more commonly referred to as VMC or Massey) is a suburban, English and French Immersion high school. Named after Vincent Massey, the eighteenth Governor General of Canada. The school is located in the neighbourhood of Fort Garry in Winnipeg, Manitoba. It has approximately 1300 students from grades 9 to 12 enrolled in over 100 courses. The school offers core subjects in English and French, but offers the opportunity to take beginner-level Spanish, and Japanese. The school has an English as an Additional Language Programme, which helps integrate students whose first language is not English.

They offer extracurricular activities including music, drama and international exchange programmes. Vincent Massey also offers online courses. The school was also one of the first National UNESCO ASPnet schools in Canada.
