= Winnipeg West =

Winnipeg West could refer to

- Winnipeg West (federal electoral district), created as a result of the 2022 Canadian federal electoral redistribution
- Winnipeg West (provincial electoral district) 1907–1914
