= Pembina Trails School Division =

School Division in Manitoba

Location
- 181 Henlow Bay, Winnipeg, MB R3Y 1M7 Canada
- Coordinates: 49.814°N 97.191°W

District information
- Superintendent: Shelley Amos
- Chair of the board: Cindy Nachtigall
- Schools: 36

Students and staff
- Students: 18.065 (September 2024)

Other information
- Elected trustees: 9
- Website: www.pembinatrails.ca

Pembina Trails School Division is a school division serving the southwest communities of Winnipeg, Manitoba, with 36 schools.

The Pembina Trails Teachers' Association represents approximately 1,200 professional staff employed by the Pembina Trails School Division.

== Schools ==
As of 2023, there are 36 schools in total, including elementary, middle schools, and high schools.

In February 2023, the Government of Manitoba announced that two new K–8 schools in the school division will be built and operating by September 2027, increasing the total number of schools to 38.

School	Language	Grades
Acadia School	English	6-8
Aniibiminan School	English	K-5
Arthur A. Leach School	English	5-8
Bairdmore School	English	K-5
Beaumont School	English	K-5
Beaverlodge School	English	K-5
Bison Run School	English	K-8
École R.H.G. Bonnycastle School	English/French	K-4
Chancellor School	English	K-5
École Charleswood School	English/French	6-8 / 5-8
École Crane	French	K-4
École Dieppe	French	K-4
Fort Richmond Collegiate	English	9-12
General Byng School	English	K-8
Henry G. Izatt Middle School	English	5-8
Laidlaw School	English	K-8
Linden Meadows School	English	K-8
École secondaire Oak Park High School	English/French	9-12
Oakenwald School	English	K-5
Pacific Junction School	English	K-5
Pembina Trails Alternative High School	English	11-12
Pembina Trails Collegiate	English	9-12
Prairie Sunrise School (formerly Ryerson School)	English	K-5
Ralph Maybank School	English	K-5
River West Park School	English	K-8
Royal School	English	K-5
École St-Avila	French	K-6
Shaftesbury High School	English	9-12
École South Pointe School	English/French	K-8
École Tuxedo Park	French	K-4
École Van Walleghem School	English/French	K-8
Institut collégial Vincent Massey Collegiate	English/French	9-12
École Viscount Alexander	French	5-8
Westdale School	English	6-8
Westgrove School	English	K-5
Whyte Ridge School	English	K-4

=== Bison Run School ===
Bison Run School is a K–8 English-language school in Pembina Trails School Division, located in the Waverley West neighbourhood of Winnipeg.

Construction on the school began in August 2021 with a total cost of $32 million, and it opened its doors on January 30, 2023. The school is a two-storey, 7,560 m^{2} (81,400 sq ft) building that is set to be part of a larger campus, with a high school currently under construction near the K–8 school.

=== Pembina Trails Collegiate ===
Pembina Trails Collegiate is a high school in Pembina Trails School Division, located next to Bison Run School, In the Waverley West/Bridgewater neighbourhood of Winnipeg.
