= Winnipeg Route 145 =

City route in Winnipeg, Canada

Route 145
- Wilkes Avenue; Sterling Lyon Parkway
- Route 145 highlighted in red

Route information
- Maintained by City of Winnipeg
- Length: 11 km (6.8 mi)
- Existed: 1966–present

Major junctions
- West end: PTH 100 (Perimeter Hwy) / PR 427 west
- Route 96 north (Shaftesbury Blvd); Route 90 (Kenaston Blvd)
- East end: Route 80 (Waverley St)

Location
- Country: Canada
- Province: Manitoba

Highway system
- Provincial highways in Manitoba; Winnipeg City Routes
← Route 135	→ Route 150

Route 145 is an arterial road in Winnipeg, Manitoba, Canada.

It follows Wilkes Avenue and the Sterling Lyon Parkway, running east from an interchange at the Perimeter Highway (PTH 100) to Waverley Street (Route 80). Heading west from Winnipeg, it continues as Provincial Road 427 into the Rural Municipality of Headingley. Wilkes Avenue runs parallel to the main Canadian National Railway line.

Route 145 previously followed Wilkes Avenue in its entirety; however, a segment of Wilkes near Kenaston Boulevard (Route 90) was demolished as part of the Kenaston Underpass project in 2005. The Sterling Lyon Parkway was constructed in its place and now makes up the route between Victor Lewis Drive and Shaftesbury Boulevard (Route 96).

Wilkes Avenue was named after Charles R. Wilkes (1825–1910), a prospector, lawyer, newsman, businessman, and repeat candidate for mayor who came to Winnipeg in 1882 from Owen Sound, Ontario. He was a strong advocate for residential development south of Portage Avenue (Route 85).

== Major intersections ==
From east to west: The entire route is in Winnipeg.

Street Name	km	mi	Destinations	Notes
Wilkes Avenue	0.0	0.0	PR 427 west (Wilkes Avenue) Perimeter Highway (PTH 100)	Interchange, Route 145 western terminus; PR 427 eastern terminus; PR 427 continues west
Wilkes Avenue	6.7	4.2	Shaftesbury Boulevard (Route 96 north) / McCreary Road – Assiniboine Park	Wilkes Avenue east end; Sterling Lyon Parkway west end
Sterling Lyon Parkway	8.4	5.2	Kenaston Boulevard (Route 90)	
Sterling Lyon Parkway	10.2	6.3	Wilkes Avenue / Victor Lewis Drive	Sterling Lyon Parkway east end; Wilkes Avenue west end
Wilkes Avenue	10.7	6.6	Waverly Street (Route 80) Hurst Way	Route 145 eastern terminus; Hurst Way continues east
1.000 mi = 1.609 km; 1.000 km = 0.621 mi: Route transition
