= William Cecil Ross =

Canadian communist politician (1911–1998)

Leader of the Communist Party of Canada – Manitoba
- In office December 12, 1948 – 1981
- Preceded by: Bill Kardash
- Succeeded by: Paula Fletcher

Personal details
- Born: Cecil Zuken; May 11, 1911
- Died: June 4, 1998 (aged 87)
- Spouse: Anne Ross
- Relatives: Joseph Zuken (brother)

William Cecil Ross (May 11, 1911 – June 4, 1998) was a politician in Manitoba, Canada, the leader of the Young Communist League and later the leader of that province's Communist Party from 1948 until his retirement in 1981.

Ross was raised in a secular Jewish family that moved from Ukraine to Winnipeg, Manitoba, in 1917. He was originally named Cecil Zuken, but legally changed his name in 1936 (in part to protect his family from anti-Communist harassment). His brother Joseph Zuken also became a Communist politician, and was for many years a prominent alderman from Winnipeg's working-class North End.

With the editorial backing of Dos Yiddishe Vort (a local Jewish newspaper), Ross was elected to the Winnipeg school board in 1936 and served in that capacity until 1939. He was also active in labour organization outside the city, and was imprisoned for six months on sedition charges after leading a strike in Flin Flon. In 1940, Ross campaigned for Leslie Morris in the federal riding of Winnipeg North, and thereby contributed to the defeat of Co-operative Commonwealth Federation incumbent Abraham Albert Heaps, the most prominent Jewish politician in the city.

Ross first ran for provincial office in the 1945 election, campaigning for the "Labor-Progressive Party" (as the Communist Party had renamed itself) in the riding of Assiniboia. He finished well behind the winner, Ernest Draffin of the Manitoba CCF.

Ross became leader of the provincial LPP on December 12, 1948, being elected by acclamation after former leader Bill Kardash resigned due to health concerns. Ross did not run in the election of 1949 because of a decision by the party to concentrate its resources—the LPP ran only two candidates, one of whom was elected. Ross continued to lead the LPP (which was renamed the Communist Party in 1959) for thirty-three years, though he was unable to prevent it from declining to a marginal political force.

Ross and Joseph Zuken had a strained relationship in the 1970s, due to Zuken's frequent criticisms of the Soviet Union and official Communist Party policy. While Zuken voiced concerns about anti-Semitism in the Soviet Union and restrictions on Jewish travel, Ross was unwilling to make public statements which violated the principle of party unity. Ross defended the Communist government of Czechoslovakia against accusations of anti-Semitism in 1952, following the trials of Rudolf Slánský and others.

Despite their differences, the brothers remained close throughout their lives. Ross played a prominent role at Zuken's funeral in 1986.

During the 1980s, Ross wrote in opposition to the Winnipeg School Board's education policy concerning the Ukrainian famine of the early 1930s. Ross acknowledged the death of millions, but denied that the government of Joseph Stalin had consciously planned an act of genocide against the Ukrainian people. (Mary Kardash, a Winnipeg school trustee of Ukrainian background, made essentially the same arguments as Ross during the course of these debates).

Ross's wife, Anne Ross, was also a public figure, serving as an administrator at the Mount Carmel Clinic in Winnipeg. In the early 1970s, this clinic became involved in a public controversy over its decision to offer abortion referral services.

Ross campaigned for federal and provincial office a total of fourteen times. Aside from the 1945 campaign mentioned above, he was a candidate in:

- Winnipeg Ward Two (municipal), 1953 Winnipeg election, (635 votes)
- Winnipeg North Centre (federal), 1953 (1606 votes), winner: Stanley Knowles (CCF)
- Winnipeg North (federal), 1957 (1579 votes), winner: Alistair Stewart (CCF)
- Winnipeg North (federal), 1958 (1503 votes), winner: Murray Smith (PC)
- Burrows (provincial), 1959 (675 votes), winner: John Hawryluk (CCF)
- Winnipeg North (federal), 1962 (1504 votes), winner: David Orlikow (NDP)
- Inkster (provincial), 1966 (312 votes), winner: Sidney Green (NDP)
- Winnipeg North (federal), 1968 (869 votes), winner: David Orlikow (NDP)
- Winnipeg North (federal), 1972 (587 votes), winner: David Orlikow (NDP)
- St. Johns (provincial), 1973 (66 votes), winner: Saul Cherniack (NDP)
- Winnipeg North (federal), 1974 (390 votes), winner: David Orlikow (NDP)
- Winnipeg North (federal), 1979 (242 votes), winner: David Orlikow (NDP)
- Winnipeg North (federal), 1980 (195 votes), winner: David Orlikow (NDP)
- St. Johns (provincial), 1981 (117 votes), winner: Donald Malinowski (NDP)
