= List of members of the Canadian House of Commons with military service (B) =

Name	Elected party	Constituency	Elected date	Military service
André Bachand	Liberal	Missisquoi	February 18, 1980	Canadian Army (1956-1958)
Edgar Crow Baker	Conservative	Victoria	June 20, 1882	Royal Navy (1860-1878)
George Harold Baker	Conservative	Brome	September 21, 1911	Canadian Army (1913-1916)
Loran Ellis Baker	Liberal	Shelburne—Yarmouth—Clare	June 11, 1945	Canadian Army (1939-1945)
Léon Balcer	Progressive Conservative	Trois-Rivières	June 27, 1949	Royal Canadian Navy (1941-1945)
Samuel Rosborough Balcom	Liberal	Halifax	June 19, 1950	Canadian Army (1942-1945)
Ged Baldwin	Progressive Conservative	Peace River	March 31, 1958	Canadian Army
James Balfour	Progressive Conservative	Regina East	October 30, 1972	Canadian Army
Charles Colquhoun Ballantyne	Unionist	St. Lawrence—St. George	December 17, 1917	Canadian Army (1916-)
Frederick Eustace Barker	Conservative	City of St. John	November 24, 1885	Canadian Army
Rex Barnes	Progressive Conservative	Gander—Grand Falls	May 13, 2002	Canadian Forces Land Force Command (1974-1978)
H. Gordon Barrett	Liberal	Lincoln	June 25, 1968	Canadian Army (1942-1945)
Theobald Butler Barrett	Progressive Conservative	Norfolk	June 11, 1945	Canadian Army (1942-1943)
Merrill Edwin Barrington	Progressive Conservative	Châteauguay—Huntingdon—Laprairie	March 31, 1958	Canadian Army (1941-1946)
John Augustus Barron	Liberal	Victoria North	February 22, 1887	Militia
James William Baskin	Progressive Conservative	Renfrew South	June 10, 1975	Royal Canadian Air Force
John Babington Macaulay Baxter	Conservative	St. John—Albert	December 6, 1921	Canadian Army (1907-1912)
Thomas Beattie	Conservative	London	June 23, 1896	Militia
Joseph-Octave Beaubien	Conservative	Montmagny	September 20, 1867	Militia
David Wilson Beaubier	Conservative	Brandon	July 28, 1930	Canadian Army (1916-)
Pierre-Clovis Beauchesne	Conservative	Bonaventure	August 26, 1879	Canadian Army (1916-)
William George Beech	Progressive Conservative	York South	June 10, 1957	Canadian Army (1914-)
Henri Sévérin Béland	Liberal	Beauce	January 8, 1902	Canadian Army
Thomas Miller Bell	Progressive Conservative	St. John—Albert	August 10, 1953	Merchant Navy
Joseph Hyacinthe Bellerose	Conservative	Laval	September 20, 1867	Militia (1858-1866)
William Moore Benidickson	Liberal	Kenora—Rainy River	June 11, 1945	Royal Canadian Air Force (1940-1945)
Les Benjamin	New Democrat	Regina—Lake Centre	June 25, 1968	Canadian Army, Royal Canadian Air Force
Colin Emerson Bennett	Liberal	Grey North	June 27, 1949	Royal Canadian Air Force (1941-1945)
Edgar Benson	Liberal	Kingston	June 18, 1962	Canadian Army (1941-1946)
Thomas John Bentley	Co-operative Commonwealth Federation	Swift Current	June 11, 1945	Canadian Army (1915-)
Stéphane Bergeron	Bloc Québécois	Verchères	October 25, 1993	Canadian Forces Maritime Command (1984-1993)
Darby Bergin	Liberal-Conservative	Cornwall	October 12, 1872	Militia (1861-)
Ernest Bertrand	Liberal	Laurier	October 14, 1935	Canadian Army
John Lemuel Bethune	Conservative	Victoria	June 23, 1896	Canadian Army
Frederick Cronyn Betts	Conservative	London	October 14, 1935	Canadian Army
Jack Bigg	Progressive Conservative	Athabaska	March 31, 1958	Canadian Army (1947-)
George Black	Conservative	Yukon	December 6, 1921	Canadian Army (1916-)
Bill Blaikie	New Democrat	Winnipeg—Birds Hill	May 22, 1979	Canadian Army (1967-1968), Canadian Forces Land Force Command (1968-1972)
Gordon Blair	Liberal	Grenville—Carleton	June 25, 1968	Canadian Army (-1945)
William Gourlay Blair	Progressive Conservative	Lanark	June 11, 1945	Canadian Army (1916-1919)
Matthew Robert Blake	Unionist	Winnipeg North	December 17, 1917	Canadian Army
Joseph-Goderic Blanchet	Liberal-Conservative	Lévis	September 20, 1867	Canadian Army
Joseph-Adéodat Blanchette	Liberal	Compton	October 14, 1935	United States Army (1917-1919)
Pierre Édouard Blondin	Conservative	Champlain	October 26, 1908	Canadian Army (1917-1918)
Gustave Blouin	Liberal	Saguenay	April 8, 1963	Canadian Army (1943-1944)
Saul Bonnell	Unionist	Kootenay East	December 17, 1917	Canadian Army (1915-1917)
Charles Stephen Booth	Liberal	Winnipeg North	March 26, 1940	Canadian Army (1916-1945), Royal Air Force (1920-1921), Royal Canadian Air Force (1921-1924)
Frederick William Borden	Liberal	Kings	January 22, 1874	Canadian Army (1969-)
Robert James Borrie	Liberal	Prince George—Peace River	June 25, 1968	Canadian Army (1945)
Prosper Boulanger	Liberal	Mercier	June 18, 1962	Royal Canadian Air Force (1939-1946)
Alfred Boultbee	Conservative	York East	September 17, 1878	Militia (1861-)
François Bourassa	Liberal	St. John's	September 20, 1867	Militia (1847-1859)
Mackenzie Bowell	Conservative	Hastings North	September 20, 1867	Militia (1867-1872)
Gerald Hugh Brabazon	Conservative	Pontiac	November 3, 1904	Militia (1885)
George Henry Bradbury	Conservative	Selkirk	October 26, 1908	Militia (1885), Canadian Army (1915-1916)
Bud Bradley	Progressive Conservative	Haldimand—Norfolk	May 22, 1979	Canadian Army (1957-1968), Canadian Forces Land Force Command (1968-1975)
Lewis Brand	Progressive Conservative	Saskatoon	November 8, 1965	Royal Canadian Navy (1950-1956)
Andrew Brewin	New Democrat	Greenwood	June 18, 1962	Canadian Army
John Brewin	New Democrat	Victoria	November 21, 1988	Royal Canadian Navy (1955-1958)
Hedley Francis Gregory Bridges	Liberal	York—Sunbury	June 11, 1945	Canadian Army (1942-)
John Wesley Brien	Unionist	Essex South	December 17, 1917	Canadian Army (1915-1921)
Ed Broadbent	New Democrat	Oshawa—Whitby	June 25, 1968	Royal Canadian Air Force
Alfred Johnson Brooks	Conservative	Royal	October 14, 1935	Canadian Army (1914-1944)
James Brown	Conservative	Hastings West	September 20, 1867	Militia
John Ferguson Browne	Progressive Conservative	Vancouver Kingsway	March 31, 1958	Canadian Army (1940-1945)
Herbert Alexander Bruce	National Government	Parkdale	March 26, 1940	Canadian Army (1914-1918)
Edwin William Brunsden	Progressive Conservative	Medicine Hat	March 31, 1985	Canadian Army (1915-1918)
William Scottie Bryce	Co-operative Commonwealth Federation	Selkirk	August 9, 1943	Canadian Army
John Francis Buckley	Liberal	Athabaska	July 28, 1930	Canadian Army (1915-1918)
Jacob Dockstader Buell	Liberal	Brockville	October 12, 1872	Militia
John Wesley Burgess	Liberal	Lambton—Kent	June 18, 1962	Canadian Army (-1946)
John Burnham	Conservative	Peterborough East	September 17, 1878	Militia
John Hampden Burnham	Conservative	Peterborough West	September 21, 1911	Canadian Army (1916-1918)
