= Roland Penner =

Canadian politician (1924–2018)

Member of the Manitoba Legislative Assembly for Fort Rouge
- In office November 17, 1981 – April 26, 1988
- Preceded by: June Westbury
- Succeeded by: Jim Carr

President of the Canadian Association of University Teachers
- In office 1979–1980
- Preceded by: Gordon Jones
- Succeeded by: Israel Unger

Personal details
- Born: July 30, 1924 Winnipeg, Manitoba, Canada
- Died: May 31, 2018 (aged 93) Winnipeg, Manitoba, Canada
- Party: New Democratic Party of Manitoba
- Other political affiliations: Communist Party of Canada (–1961); Labor-Progressive Party of Canada
- Parent: Jacob Penner
- Relatives: Norman Penner (brother)
- Education: University of Manitoba
- Profession: Lawyer
- Awards: Order of Manitoba (2014); Order of Canada (2000)
- Military Service
- Branch: Canadian Army
- Conflicts: Second World War

Roland Penner CM OM QC (July 30, 1924 – May 31, 2018) was a Canadian political activist and lawyer who became a cabinet minister in the Manitoba provincial government and dean of law at the University of Manitoba.

== Education and early career ==
Penner was born in Winnipeg, Manitoba, the son of Winnipeg alderman Jacob Penner (d. 1965) and Rose Shapack (d. 1970). His father was from a Mennonite background, and his mother was Jewish. He served in Europe during World War II in the Canadian artillery. At the end of the war, he earned credits at the Khaki University of Canada. He continued his education at the University of Manitoba, where he received a Bachelor of Arts degree in 1949 and an LL.B. in 1961. He began working at the University of Manitoba in 1967, and became a professor in 1972. From 1972 to 1978, he was the president of Legal Aid Manitoba, and from 1979 to 1980, he was president of the Canadian Association of University Teachers. In 1949, he married Adeline ("Addie") Wdoviak, and in 1982, he married Janet Kay Baldwin.

== Political career ==
Penner's parents and his older brother Norman were active in the communist Labor-Progressive Party. In the federal election of 1953, he ran as a candidate of the party in the predominantly middle-class riding of Winnipeg South Centre. He finished a poor fourth with only 504 votes. He also ran as an LPP candidate for school trustee in the Winnipeg municipal election of 1953.

Penner left the Labour-Progressive Party in 1961, part of a mass exodus in the years following the Soviet invasion of Hungary and Nikita Khrushchev's secret speech on Joseph Stalin's crimes. His brother Norman had left in 1957, while his father Jacob remained a party member. Penner completed law school and practised criminal law for several years before becoming a law professor.

In 1980, he announced that he would seek the nomination of the New Democratic Party in the riding of St. Johns in the 1981 election. There was some speculation that Penner's communist past would damage his political ambitions, especially as Winnipeg alderman Joe Zuken had lost a mayoral election the previous year when his communist politics became an issue. Penner rejected this suggestion, however, saying, "There's a fundamental difference between Joe and myself in that I'm not a member of the Communist Party. I'm a member of the NDP. [...] I was a member of the Communist Party at one time, but that's ancient history. That was twenty years ago. It may be raised but it's not relevant. It would ignore what I've been doing the last two decades." He later chose not to run in St. Johns, and sought another riding. The party wanted him to run against Progressive Party leader Sid Green in the riding of Inkster. He declined and ran instead in Fort Rouge, where he defeated incumbent Liberal June Westbury.

On November 30, 1981, Premier Howard Pawley appointed Penner to be Government House Leader, chair of the Treasury Board, and attorney general. He was also given ministerial responsibility for the Liquor Control Act on March 4, 1982, and stood down as Treasury Board Chair on July 28 of the same year. On November 4, 1983, he stood down as house leader and received the additional portfolio of Consumer and Corporate Affairs.

Penner was easily re-elected in the 1986 election. He was retained as attorney general and given responsibility for Constitutional Affairs and the Liquor Control Act. Following a cabinet shuffle on September 21, 1987, Penner was named Minister of Education, while retaining responsibility for constitutional matters.

The New Democratic Party experienced a significant decline in its popularity between 1986 and 1988, and Penner lost his seat to Liberal challenger Jim Carr in the 1988 provincial election.

As attorney-general, Penner introduced Manitoba's first human rights legislation. He also introduced freedom of information legislation and was responsible for implementing legislation requiring French language services after the Supreme Court of Canada ruled that the province was violating its constitutional obligations. (The latter action resulted in a backlash in some parts of the province, leading to the rise of anti-bilingualism groups such as the Confederation of Regions Party.) As minister responsible for constitutional affairs, Penner also participated in negotiations for what became the Meech Lake Accord.

Although he supported abortion rights, Penner was required to uphold a decision by the Manitoba courts which prevented Henry Morgentaler from opening a private clinic in the province. Penner was also an early champion of including sexual orientation in Canada's human rights code.

Because of his background in communist politics, Penner was for many years forbidden from entering the United States of America under the McCarran-Walter Act. Special provisions had to be made allowing him to enter America as a cabinet minister.

== After politics ==
Following his loss, Penner returned to teaching at the University of Manitoba. He taught courses in constitutional law, criminal law, labour law, evidence, and the Canadian Charter of Rights and Freedoms. He served as a University Dean between 1989 and 1994. He wrote several works, including a number on the privacy rights of Canadians. In 1993, he openly questioned the attempts of Bob Rae's New Democratic Party government in Ontario to restrict tenure to professors deemed to hold socially unacceptable views. He retired from teaching in 2009.

In 2010, it was revealed that Penner's name was on a secret list of Communist sympathizers kept during the Cold War; these persons were to be watched by the RCMP and could have been detained at internment camps in the event of a national security crisis.

In 2007, Penner published A Glowing Dream: A Memoir (Winnipeg: J. Gordon Shillingford Publishing, 2007). In 2011, he co-wrote They Shoot Doctors Don't They: A Memoir with Jack Fainman. He died on May 31, 2018 in Winnipeg.

== Honours ==
In 2000, he was named to the Order of Canada. In 2014, he was made a member of the Order of Manitoba.

== Electoral record ==
1988 Manitoba general election: Fort Rouge
Party	Candidate	Votes	%	±%
Liberal	Jim Carr	5,127	48.91	29.44
New Democratic	Roland Penner	2,912	27.78	-21.08
Progressive Conservative	Robert Haier	2,303	21.97	-8.00
Progressive	Gordon Pratt	75	0.72	–
Libertarian	Dennis Owens	66	0.63	-0.54
Total valid votes		10,483	–	–
Rejected		50	–	
Eligible voters / turnout		15,057	69.95	5.62
Liberal gain from New Democratic		Swing		+25.22
Source(s) Source: Manitoba. Chief Electoral Officer (1999). Statement of Votes for the 37th Provincial General Election, September 21, 1999 (PDF) (Report). Winnipeg: Elections Manitoba.

1986 Manitoba general election: Fort Rouge
Party	Candidate	Votes	%	±%
New Democratic	Roland Penner	4,223	48.86	4.30
Progressive Conservative	Robert P. Haier	2,590	29.97	0.79
Liberal	Lionel Ditz	1,683	19.47	-5.31
Libertarian	Clancy Smith	101	1.17	–
Communist	Nigel Hanrahan	46	0.53	–
Total valid votes		8,643	–	–
Rejected		53	–	
Eligible voters / Turnout		13,517	64.33	-7.50
Source(s) Source: Manitoba. Chief Electoral Officer (1999). Statement of Votes for the 37th Provincial General Election, September 21, 1999 (PDF) (Report). Winnipeg: Elections Manitoba.

1981 Manitoba general election: Fort Rouge
Party	Candidate	Votes	%	±%
New Democratic	Roland Penner	4,342	44.57	10.77
Progressive Conservative	Perry Schulman	2,843	29.18	2.19
Liberal	June Westbury	2,415	24.79	-14.43
Progressive	Bud Boyce	143	1.47	–
Total valid votes		9,743	–	–
Rejected		77	–	
Eligible voters / Turnout		13,671	71.83	–
Source(s) Source: Manitoba. Chief Electoral Officer (1999). Statement of Votes for the 37th Provincial General Election, September 21, 1999 (PDF) (Report). Winnipeg: Elections Manitoba.

1953 Canadian federal election: Winnipeg South Centre
Party	Candidate	Votes	%	±%
Progressive Conservative	Gordon Churchill	12,489	42.7	−0.9
Liberal	A.W. Hanks	9,752	33.3	−4.9
Co-operative Commonwealth	Gordon R. Fines	6,506	22.2	+4.1
Labor–Progressive	Roland Penner	504	1.7	–
Total valid votes		29,251	100.0	
