= 1953 Winnipeg municipal election =

The 1953 Winnipeg municipal election was held on October 28, 1953, to elect councillors and school trustees in the Manitoba city of Winnipeg. There was no mayoral election; mayors were elected for two-year terms in this period, and 1953 was an off year.

There was a total of 18 councillors and 15 trustees in this period, with members elected in alternate years. The councillors and trustees were elected by single transferable vote, with three members elected in each of three wards. Electors cast ranked ballots where first, second and third choices were marked for the appropriate candidate.

Three political parties contested this election. The Civic Election Committee (CEC) was a pro-business alliance of Progressive Conservatives and Liberals, and was the dominant party in Winnipeg's predominantly middle-class first ward. The CEC claimed not to be a political party as such, but held nomination meetings and ran organized campaigns in a partisan manner. The socialist Cooperative Commonwealth Federation (CCF) and the communist Labour Progressive Party (LLP) also contested the election. Both parties were strongest in Ward Three, covering the city's working-class north end.

The CEC won five of the nine contested council seats, down two from their pre-election total. The CCF gained one council seat for a total of three, while the LPP regained a foothold on council by winning a seat in Ward Three. The CEC won six trustee seats, the CCF two, and the LPP one.

== Council Results ==
=== Ward One ===
The CCF attempted to break the CEC's hold over Ward One by fielding only one candidate, in an effort to avoid vote-splitting among supporters (although vote transfers under STV usually address vote splitting). This tactic had proven successful the previous year, when CCF candidate David Mulligan was elected to the second position. Ernest Draffin was not able to repeat this success, however, and all three CEC incumbents were re-elected. The quota for election was 5,322 votes (25%).

Party Totals

Party	Votes	%	Number of members elected
Citizen's Election Committee	16,703	78.47	3
Cooperative Commonwealth Federation	4,582	21.53	

First Count

Party	Candidate	Votes	%	
Citizen's Election Committee	(incumbent)C.E. Simonite	6,616	31.08	1
Citizen's Election Committee	(incumbent)Gordon Chown	5,505	25.86	2
Cooperative Commonwealth Federation	Ernest Draffin	4,582	21.53	
Citizen's Election Committee	(incumbent)Maude McCreery	4,582	21.53	

Quota being 25 percent plus 1, Simonite and Chown were declared elected on first count. In the second round of counting, Simonite's surplus 1,294 votes were distributed as follows: McCreery 1177, Draffin 117. McCreery, now with 27 percent of the vote, was declared elected to fill the last open seat.

Second Count

Party	Candidate	Votes	%	
Citizen's Election Committee	(incumbent)C.E. Simonite	5,322	25.00	1
Citizen's Election Committee	(incumbent)Gordon Chown	5,505	25.86	2
Citizen's Election Committee	(incumbent)Maude McCreery	5,759	27.06	3
Cooperative Commonwealth Federation	Ernest Draffin	4,699	22.08	

=== Ward Two ===
Veteran CCF alderman V.B. Anderson was the only incumbent seeking re-election in this ward, as the two CEC incumbents had both announced their retirement. The CEC and CCF both ran two candidates, effectively giving each party a bye for one of the positions. Former Member of the Legislative Assembly (MLA) Gordon Fines finished second, and gave the CCF a second seat in the ward. LPP candidate William Cecil Ross, the leader of the provincial party, fared poorly outside of his party's north-end base. The quota for election was 3,783 votes (25%).

Party Totals

Party	Votes	%	Number of members elected
Citizen's Election Committee	7,408	48.96	1
Cooperative Commonwealth Federation	7,087	46.84	2
Labor-Progressive	635	4.20	

First Count

Party	Candidate	Votes	%	
Citizen's Election Committee	Paul Goodman	3,968	26.23	1
Cooperative Commonwealth Federation	Gordon Fines	3,567	23.58	
Cooperative Commonwealth Federation	(incumbent)V.B. Anderson	3,520	23.27	
Citizen's Election Committee	Albert E. Bennett	3,440	22.74	
Labor-Progressive	William Cecil Ross	635	4.20	

Second Count

Ross, being the least-popular candidate, was eliminated. His 635 votes were distributed as follows: Fines 134, Anderson 134, Bennett 88. 279 of his votes were non-transferable.

Party	Candidate	Votes	%	
Citizen's Election Committee	Paul Goodman	3,968	26.23	1
Cooperative Commonwealth Federation	Gordon Fines	3,701	24.46	
Cooperative Commonwealth Federation	(incumbent)V.B. Anderson	3,654	24.15	
Citizen's Election Committee	Albert E. Bennett	3,528	23.32	
Votes not transferred		279	1.84	

Goodman exceeded quota and was declared elected.

Third Count

Goodman's surplus 185 votes were distributed as follows: Bennett 121, Anderson 41, Fines 23.

Bennett remaining the lowest-ranking candidate, he was to be eliminated. this would leave only two candidates remaining and two open seats. Fines and Anderson were declared elected after the third count.

Party	Candidate	Votes	%	
Citizen's Election Committee	Paul Goodman	3,783	25.00	1
Cooperative Commonwealth Federation	Gordon Fines	3,724	24.61	2
Cooperative Commonwealth Federation	(incumbent)V.B. Anderson	3,695	24.42	3
Citizen's Election Committee	Albert E. Bennett	3,649	24.12	
Votes not transferred		279	1.84	

=== Ward Three ===
The CEC fielded a full slate of three candidates in this ward, with the intention of re-electing both of their incumbents. They succeeded in with Slaw Rebchuk, but lost their other seat to longtime LPP politician Jacob Penner. Penner, himself a veteran member of the council, had been defeated by CEC candidate Stan Carrick in the 1952 election; his victory in 1953 returned the LPP to council representation after a year's absence. The CCF retained their seat without difficulty, as council incumbent Jack Blumberg finished in first place. The CCF's decision to field only two candidates likely benefited Penner's campaign. The quota for election was 4,715 votes (25%).

Party Totals

Party	Votes	%	Number of members elected
Citizen's Election Committee	8,206	43.52	1
Cooperative Commonwealth Federation	6,547	34.72	1
Labor-Progressive	4,103	21.76	1

First Count

Party	Candidate	Votes	%	
Cooperative Commonwealth Federation	(incumbent)Jack Blumberg	5,106	27.08	1
Labor-Progressive	Jacob Penner	4,103	21.76	
Citizen's Election Committee	(incumbent)Slaw Rebchuk	3,697	19.61	
Citizen's Election Committee	(incumbent)Frank Wagner	2,683	14.23	
Citizen's Election Committee	Walter Mazapa	1,826	9.68	
Cooperative Commonwealth Federation	H.L. Stevens	1,441	7.64	

Blumberg was declared elected to the first position, and his 391 surplus votes were distributed as follows: Stevens 184, Penner 80, Wagner 75, Rebchuk 36, Mazapa 16.

Second Count

Party	Candidate	Votes	%	
Cooperative Commonwealth Federation	(incumbent)Jack Blumberg	4,715	25.00	1
Labor-Progressive	Jacob Penner	4,183	22.18	
Citizen's Election Committee	(incumbent)Slaw Rebchuk	3,733	19.80	
Citizen's Election Committee	(incumbent)Frank Wagner	2,758	14.63	
Citizen's Election Committee	Walter Mazapa	1,842	9.77	
Cooperative Commonwealth Federation	H.L. Stevens	1,625	8.62	

Stevens was eliminated, and his 1,625 votes were distributed as follows: Wagner 441, Penner 238, Rebchuk 158, Mazapa 91. 697 votes were non-transferable.

Third Count

Party	Candidate	Votes	%	
Cooperative Commonwealth Federation	(incumbent)Jack Blumberg	4,715	25.00	1
Labor-Progressive	Jacob Penner	4,421	23.45	
Citizen's Election Committee	(incumbent)Slaw Rebchuk	3,891	20.64	
Citizen's Election Committee	(incumbent)Frank Wagner	3,199	16.97	
Citizen's Election Committee	Walter Mazapa	1,933	10.25	
Votes not transferred		697	3.70	

Fourth Count

Mazapa was eliminated, and his 1,933 votes were transferred as follows: Rebchuk 938, Wagner 285, Penner 125. 585 votes were non-transferable.

Party	Candidate	Votes	%	
Cooperative Commonwealth Federation	(incumbent)Jack Blumberg	4,715	25.00	1
Citizen's Election Committee	(incumbent)Slaw Rebchuk	4,829	25.61	2
Labor-Progressive	Jacob Penner	4,546	24.11	
Citizen's Election Committee	(incumbent)Frank Wagner	3,484	18.48	
Votes not transferred		1,282	6.80	

Rebchuk (2nd) was declared elected as he has quota.

Penner (3rd) was declared elected after the fourth count as Wagner's elimination would leave only one candidate remaining and one open seat.

Rebchuk's 114 surplus votes were not transferred, as they could not possibly have put Wagner ahead of Penner.

Wagner's votes were not transferred because with his elimination, the last seat was filled.

== Trustee results ==
=== Ward One ===
The school trustee election in Ward One yielded essentially the same result as the council election. The CCF ran a single candidate to prevent vote splitting, but the CEC nevertheless retained all three positions. The quota for election was 5,278 votes (25%).

Party Totals

Party	Votes	%	Elected
Citizen's Election Committee	17,379	82.33	3
Cooperative Commonwealth Federation	3,729	17.67	

First Count

Party	Candidate	Votes	%	
Citizen's Election Committee	(incumbent)Edith I. Tennant	7,277	34.48	1
Citizen's Election Committee	(incumbent)Hugh B. Parker	5,799	27.47	2
Citizen's Election Committee	Ken E. McAskill	4,303	20.39	
Cooperative Commonwealth Federation	J.B. Gladstone	3,729	17.67	

Tennant's surplus 1,999 votes were distributed as follows: McAskill 1483, Gladstone 516. McAskill was declared elected to the third position.

First Count

Party	Candidate	Votes	%	
Citizen's Election Committee	(incumbent)Edith I. Tennant	5,278	25.00	1
Citizen's Election Committee	(incumbent)Hugh B. Parker	5,799	27.47	2
Citizen's Election Committee	Ken E. McAskill	5,786	27.41	3
Cooperative Commonwealth Federation	J.B. Gladstone	4,245	20.11	

=== Ward Two ===
The CEC and CCF each fielded two candidates, effectively giving both parties a bye for one of the seats. The CEC's two incumbents were re-elected without difficulty, while CCF candidate Walter Seaberg finally won a seat after a number of failed attempts. The LPP again fared poorly outside of their Ward Three base. It is notable that the LPP candidate was Roland Penner, who later left the Communist movement and served as Manitoba's Attorney-General in the 1980s. The quota for election was 3,752 votes (25%).

Party Totals

Party	Votes	%	Elected
Citizen's Election Committee	9,588	63.90	2
Cooperative Commonwealth Federation	4,662	31.07	1
Labor-Progressive	754	5.03	

First Count

Party	Candidate	Votes	%	
Citizen's Election Committee	(incumbent)Nan Murphy	5,871	39.13	1
Citizen's Election Committee	(incumbent)Campbell Malcolm	3,717	24.77	
Cooperative Commonwealth Federation	Walter Seaberg	3,685	24.56	
Cooperative Commonwealth Federation	A.E. Frank Vandurme	977	6.51	
Labor-Progressive	Roland Penner	754	5.03	

Murphy's surplus 2,119 votes were distributed as follows: Malcolm 1745, Seaberg 192, Vandurme 99, Penner 83. Malcolm and Seaberg were both declared elected.

Second Count

Party	Candidate	Votes	%	
Citizen's Election Committee	(incumbent)Nan Murphy	3,752	25.00	1
Citizen's Election Committee	(incumbent)Campbell Malcolm	5,462	36.40	2
Cooperative Commonwealth Federation	Walter Seaberg	3,877	25.84	3
Cooperative Commonwealth Federation	A.E. Frank Vandurme	1,076	7.17	
Labor-Progressive	Roland Penner	837	5.58	

=== Ward Three ===
LPP candidate Joseph Zuken topped the polls to win the first trustee position in north-end Winnipeg. The CEC and CCF both fielded two candidates, and won one seat apiece. Zuken's victory may be credited to his personal popularity and reputation as a diligent worker, as well as to the LPP's general base of support. The quota for election was 4,658 votes (25%).

Party Totals

Party	Votes	%	Elected
Citizen's Election Committee	7,850	42.14	1
Cooperative Commonwealth Federation	5,743	30.83	1
Labor-Progressive	5,035	27.03	1

First Count

Party	Candidate	Votes	%	
Labor-Progressive	(incumbent)Joseph Zuken	5,035	27.03	1
Citizen's Election Committee	(incumbent)Andrew Zaharychuk	4,464	23.96	
Citizen's Election Committee	Edward Bachynski	3,386	18.18	
Cooperative Commonwealth Federation	Walter Hatcher	3,082	16.54	
Cooperative Commonwealth Federation	Sam Luginsky	2,661	14.28	

Luginsky was eliminated, and his 2661 votes were distributed as follows: Hatcher 1198, Zaharychuk 262, Bachynski 240. 961 votes were not transferred. Zaharychuk and Hatcher were declared elected. Zuken's surplus was not transferred, as it would not have made a difference to the outcome.

Party	Candidate	Votes	%	
Labor-Progressive	(incumbent)Joseph Zuken	5,035	27.03	1
Citizen's Election Committee	(incumbent)Andrew Zaharychuk	4,726	25.37	2
Cooperative Commonwealth Federation	Walter Hatcher	4,280	22.98	3
Citizen's Election Committee	Edward Bachynski	3,626	19.47	
Votes not transferred		961	5.16	
