= Rey Pagtakhan =

Filipino Canadian politician

The Honourable Rey D. Pagtakhan PC

Minister of Western Economic Diversification
- In office 12 December 2003 – 19 July 2004
- Prime Minister: Paul Martin

Secretary of State (Science, Research and Development)
- In office 26 May 2002 – 11 December 2003
- Prime Minister: Jean Chrétien

Minister of Veterans Affairs
- In office 15 January 2002 – 11 December 2003
- Prime Minister: Jean Chrétien

Secretary of State (Asia-Pacific)
- In office 9 January 2001 – 14 January 2002
- Prime Minister: Jean Chrétien

Parliamentary Secretary to the Prime Minister
- In office 10 July 1997 – 16 July 1998
- Prime Minister: Jean Chrétien

Member of Parliament for Winnipeg North—St. Paul
- In office November 21, 1988 – June 28, 2004
- Preceded by: David Orlikow
- Succeeded by: Judy Wasylycia-Leis

Personal details
- Born: Reynaldo Daluz Pagtakhan; 7 January 1935 (age 91) Manila, Philippines
- Party: Liberal
- Spouse: Gloria L.L. Visarra (m. 1964)
- Children: 4
- Education: University of the Philippines (BSc, MD); University of Manitoba (MSc)

Reynaldo Daluz Pagtakhan, PC (born 7 January 1935) is a Canadian physician, professor and politician. He was a cabinet minister in the governments of Jean Chrétien and Paul Martin, and served as a Member of Parliament from 1988 until his defeat in the 2004 election.

== Early life and education ==
Born at the Mary Johnston Hospital in Manila and raised in Bacoor, Cavite in the Philippines, Pagtakhan received his Doctor of Medicine from the University of the Philippines. He is a brother of the Mu Sigma Phi, the first, the largest, and the most acclaimed medical fraternity in Asia. He completed his pediatric residency and cardiology fellowship at the Washington University Medical Center/St. Louis Children's Hospital and his Master of Science from the University of Manitoba and respirology fellowship at the Children's Hospital of Winnipeg. The degree of Doctor of Laws (honoris causa) was conferred on Pagtakhan by the University of the Philippines. In 2010, the degree of Doctor of Science (honoris causa) conferred by the University of Perpetual Help Rizal Jonelta Foundation-School of Medicine

== Medical career and community involvement ==
Prior to his political career, Pagtakhan was a Full Professor of Pediatrics and Child Health at the University of Manitoba Faculty of Medicine. He joined the medical faculty at the University of Manitoba in 1971 as a lecturer and became a professor in 1985. He also worked as a pediatric respirologist at the Winnipeg Children's Hospital between 1971 and 1988.

In addition to the above responsibilities, Pagtakhan also served as Director of the Manitoba Cystic Fibrosis Centre, President of the Manitoba Pediatric Society, member of the Winnipeg Police Commission, the first chair of the Board of Presidents of the Canadian Ethnocultural Council, and National President of the United Council of Filipino Canadian Associations in Canada.

In 1986, he was elected as a Winnipeg school trustee in the St. Vital district and served in that capacity until 1988.

== Political career ==
Pagtakhan was first elected to the House of Commons of Canada in the 1988 federal election in the riding of Winnipeg North, defeating incumbent New Democrat David Orlikow who had held the riding since 1962. He became the first Filipino-born Canadian to be elected to the House of Commons. He was easily re-elected in the 1993 election, defeating New Democratic challenger Judy Wasylycia-Leis. In the elections of 1997 and 2000, he was elected for the redistributed riding of Winnipeg North-St. Paul.

Pagtakhan served as parliamentary secretary to Prime Minister Jean Chrétien from 23 February 1996, to 15 July 1998. He was appointed to cabinet on 9 January 2001, and served as Secretary of State (Asia-Pacific) until 15 January 2002. His appointment to cabinet marked the first time in over 75 years that an M.P. from north Winnipeg became a member of the federal cabinet. As Secretary of State (Asia-Pacific), Pagtakhan took on a number of tasks including representing Canada as Head of its delegation to the United Nations Conference on the Illicit Trade in Small Arms and Light Weapons in All Its Aspects.

On 15 January 2002, he was promoted to Minister of Veterans Affairs and Minister responsible for Manitoba. In this capacity, he served on the Cabinet Committees on Economic Union, Social Union and Government Communications.

During his tenure as Minister responsible for Manitoba (also known as the Senior Minister for Manitoba), Pagtakhan was part of the government that funded major projects in Manitoba such as the expansion of the Red River Floodway and the Canadian Museum for Human Rights. Pagtakhan also served as Secretary of State (Science, Research and Development) from 26 May 2002, to 12 December 2003.

On 12 December 2003, new prime minister Paul Martin appointed him as Minister of Western Economic Diversification. In this capacity he served on the Cabinet Committees on Domestic Affairs and Aboriginal Affairs. During his tenure in this position, Pagtakhan, amongst other things, announced funding for the Winnipeg-based International Centre for Infectious Diseases.

Further redistribution pushed Pagtakhan back into the riding of Winnipeg North for the election of 2004. He lost to Judy Wasylycia-Leis, who had been elected for Winnipeg North Centre in 1997 and 2000.

== Life after politics ==
Since returning to private life in 2004, Pagtakhan has been actively involved in numerous ventures. In 2005 and 2006, he served as the Founding Director of the Global College at the University of Winnipeg and Chair of the college's advisory board. He is currently co-chair of its Global Advisors. In addition, Pagtakhan serves as a Public Adjudicator of the Prairie Regional Panel of the Canadian Broadcast Standards Council, Governor of the Canadian International Peace Project and Chair of the Manitoba Liberal Party's Election Readiness Committee. In 2017, he was made a Member of the Order of Manitoba.

27th Canadian Ministry (2003–2006) – Cabinet of Paul Martin
Cabinet post (1)
Predecessor	Office	Successor
Allan Rock	Minister of Western Economic Diversification; 2003–2004	Stephen Owen
26th Canadian Ministry (1993–2003) – Cabinet of Jean Chrétien
Cabinet post (1)
Predecessor	Office	Successor
Ron Duhamel	Minister of Veterans Affairs; 2002–2003	John McCallum
Sub-Cabinet Posts (2)
Predecessor	Title	Successor
Maurizio Bevilacqua	Secretary of State (Science, Research and Technology) (2002–2003)	
Raymond Chan	Secretary of State (Asia-Pacific) (2001–2002)	David Kilgour
