= David Orlikow =

Canadian politician (1918–1998)

- Official 1984 portrait

Member of the House of Commons of Canada for Winnipeg North
- In office June 18, 1962 – November 21, 1988
- Preceded by: Murray Smith
- Succeeded by: Rey Pagtakhan

Member of the Legislative Assembly of Manitoba for St. Johns
- In office June 16, 1958 – May 1962
- Preceded by: new constituency
- Succeeded by: Saul Cherniack

Member of the Winnipeg City Council
- In office 1951–1958

Winnipeg School Trustee
- In office 1945–1950

Personal details
- Born: April 18, 1918 Winnipeg, Manitoba
- Died: January 19, 1998 (aged 79) Winnipeg, Manitoba
- Party: New Democratic Party
- Other political affiliations: Co-operative Commonwealth Federation
- Relations: Saul Cherniack (cousin); Gordon Orlikow (nephew); John Orlikow (nephew)
- Education: University of Manitoba
- Occupation: Labour educator, pharmacist

David Orlikow (April 20, 1918 – January 19, 1998) was a Canadian politician, and a long-serving member of the House of Commons of Canada. He represented the riding of Winnipeg North from 1962 to 1988 as a member of the New Democratic Party.

== Family ==
Orlikow was the son of Louis Orlikow (d. 1965) and Sarah Cherniack (d. 1927). He was half-brother of Lionel Orlikow (1932-2008), who was the son of Louis Orlikow and Sylverta “Sylvia” Anderson (d. 1971), and who married Elizabeth Anne Slavin (1932-2021) with whom he had five sons and two daughters (twin brothers David and John, Gord, Dan, Peter, Nancy, and Kate).

His first cousin was Saul Cherniack, also a prominent Manitoba politician and a cabinet minister in the provincial government of Edward Schreyer. His nephew Gordon Orlikow is a former decathlon, heptathlon, and hurdles competitor who won medals in the 73rd Drake Relays, the 1981 Maccabiah Games and 1985 Maccabiah Games in Israel, and the 1987 Pan American Games, is a former Chairman of the Board of Directors of Athletics Canada, a member of the Canadian Olympic Committee, and a Senior Client Partner at Korn/Ferry International.

He was educated at the University of Manitoba, and worked as a labour educator and pharmacist. Orlikow married Velma (Val) Kane on June 1, 1946. They had one daughter, Leslie.

His mother, Sarah, was first elected to the Winnipeg School Board as the school trustee for Ward 3 in 1925. Orlikow's cousin, Mindel Cherniak Sheps, succeeded her in the seat when she retired, and held it until 1950 when her brother, Saul Cherniak, was elected.

Orlikow's brother, Lionel, was also a trustee on the Winnipeg school board from 1988 to 1998. When Lionel Orlikow retired, he was succeeded by his son John, now a Winnipeg City Councillor.

== Municipal politics ==
He served as a trustee on the Winnipeg School Board from 1945 to 1951, and was an alderman in the city of Winnipeg from 1951 to 1959. He also served on the board of directors for Winnipeg's John Howard & Elizabeth Fry Society from 1958 to 1961, and was a board member of the Welfare Council of Greater Winnipeg in 1958.

Orlikow was also involved with the Jewish Labour Society and the Canadian Labour Congress. He helped to organize a steelworkers' union in the northern Manitoba town of Thompson, after INCO set up operations in the area. Other organizations of which Orlikow was involved included the Union Centre and the Manitoba Society of Seniors.

Orlikow was a founding member of the NDP and a lifetime member of the CCF/NDP. In 1961, Orlikow took part in Manitoba CCF's transition to the New Democratic Party.

== Manitoba Legislature ==
In the provincial election of 1958, Orlikow was elected to the Legislative Assembly of Manitoba for the Cooperative Commonwealth Federation in the north-end Winnipeg constituency of St. John's. He defeated his Progressive Conservative and Liberal-Progressive opponents by a significant margin. He was re-elected in the 1959 election, by the reduced margin of 251 votes over Progressive Conservative opponent Dan Zaharia. David Orlikow was an NDP MLA from June 16, 1958 to May 1962.

Orlikow maintained an interest in the Manitoba NDP after switching to federal politics. In 1968-69, he helped facilitate the party's transition of leadership from Russell Paulley to Edward Schreyer.

The Manitoba Legislature paid tribute to Orlikow on Thursday June 25, 1998.

Judy Wasylycia-Leis, whose riding, both as an MLA and an MP included much of the area earlier represented by Orlikow, recalled the advice and information she used to receive from Orlikow and his many phone calls. Wasylycia-Leis's provincial counterparts NDP MLAs Dave Chomiak and Doug Martindale also admitted to being among those on the receiving end of those phone calls.

According to Doug Martindale, Orlikow "never really retired" from politics in that Orlikow was always researching various issues and providing the information he gathered to various Manitoba NDP MLAs and MPs. Orlikow was a frequent visiter to the Manitoba Legislature's library and, even when hospitalized, he managed to transform his hospital room into a mini office. During the last week of his life, Orlikow was researching the financial impact of smoking on the health care system, and what types of lawsuits he figured the Federal and Provincial governments should launch against the tobacco industry to recover some of the cost.

== Federal politics ==
Orlikow resigned his legislative seat in May 1962 to run for the Canadian House of Commons. He was elected in Winnipeg North in the federal election of 1962, defeating Liberal Paul Parashin by just under 4,000 votes. He defeated Parashin again by a narrower margin in the 1963 election, but increased his majority to nearly 10,000 votes in the election of 1965.

He came close to losing his seat in the "Trudeaumania" election of 1968, defeating Liberal Cecil Semchyshyn by only 963 votes. After this, he was returned by safe majorities in the elections of 1972 and 1974, 1979, 1980 and 1984.

There was a provincial swing against the NDP in the federal election of 1988, and Orlikow unexpectedly lost the Winnipeg North riding to Liberal Rey Pagtakhan by fewer than 2,000 votes. After a 26-year career in the Commons, Orlikow was genuinely surprised by the result. Orlikow was an NDP MP from June 18, 1962 to November 21, 1988.

Throughout his career, Orlikow fought for progressive policies in fields such as immigration, refugees, social justice and labour. During the 1980s, he sought reforms to Canada's Bank Act which would have required banks to invest a portion of their money in local development projects. In the very last week of his life, he was researching ways for the federal and provincial governments to recover monies from tobacco companies for the social costs of cigarette use.

After his death in January 1998, former staffer Dan O'Connor wrote the following eulogy:

"David was always on the side of the ordinary person. He was relentless in the pursuit of justice from big government or big business. The most important job in his office was the individual case work, and he didn't trust it to anyone else. He made every phone call and wrote every letter."

The Canadian House of Commons paid tribute to Orlikow on February 4, 1998.

== Suing the CIA ==
During the 1950s, Velma Orlikow was a patient at the Allan Memorial Institute in Montreal at a time when the American Central Intelligence Agency was conducting its MKULTRA brainwashing experiments at the facility. She was unwittingly dosed with LSD and was exposed to brainwashing tapes. Along with eight other former patients, she later sued the CIA for mistreatment and won.

Early in 1979, Orlikow called office of lawyers Joseph Rauh and Jim Turner after reading New York Times story concerning CIA involvement in Ewen Cameron’s research. The Tuesday, August 2, 1977 story, written by Nicholas Horrock, was entitled "Private Institutions Used In CIA Effort To Control Behavior". Horrock's article referred to the work of John Marks, whose documentation of CIA activities, obtained under the Freedom of Information Act, was used in what was to be referred to as the Orlikow, et al. v. United States case. The other plaintiffs eventually included Jean-Charles Page, Robert Logie, Rita Zimmerman, Louis Weinstein, Janine Huard, Lyvia Stadler, Mary Morrow, and Mrs. Florence Langleben. The CIA settled in 1988. Velma died in 1990.

Near the end of his life, David Orlikow encouraged NDP MPs such as Svend Robinson to seek government compensation for the Allan Institute's victims, and for their families.
