= Judy Wasylycia-Leis =

Canadian politician (born 1951)

Member of Parliament
- In office June 28, 2004 – April 30, 2010
- Preceded by: Riding established
- Succeeded by: Kevin Lamoureux
- Constituency: Winnipeg North
- In office June 2, 1997 – June 28, 2004
- Preceded by: David Walker
- Succeeded by: Riding dissolved
- Constituency: Winnipeg North Centre

Manitoba Minister of Culture, Heritage and Recreation
- In office April 17, 1986 – May 9, 1988
- Premier: Howard Pawley
- Preceded by: Eugene Kostyra
- Succeeded by: Bonnie Mitchelson

Member of the Legislative Assembly of Manitoba for St. Johns
- In office March 18, 1986 – August 12, 1993
- Preceded by: Don Malinowski
- Succeeded by: Gord Mackintosh

Personal details
- Born: Klazina Judith Wasylycia; August 10, 1951 (age 75) Winterbourne, Ontario, Canada
- Party: New Democratic Party
- Spouse: Ron Leis
- Education: University of Waterloo; Carleton University
- Profession: Organizer; policy advisor

Klazina Judith Wasylycia-Leis (/ˌwɑːʃəˈliːʃə ˈliːs/; born 1951) is a Canadian politician. She was a Manitoba cabinet minister in the government of Howard Pawley from 1986 to 1988, and was a member of the House of Commons of Canada from September 22, 1997, to April 30, 2010. In 2010 and 2014 she was an unsuccessful candidate for Mayor of Winnipeg.

== Early life ==
She was born Klazina Judith Wasylycia, the daughter of Harry Wasylycia and Klazina Nielson, in Winterbourne, Ontario, a small town near Kitchener, on August 10, 1951. She graduated from Elmira District Secondary School in 1970. Wasylycia-Leis was educated at the University of Waterloo, where she received a Bachelor of Arts in political science and French in 1974, and Carleton University, where she received a Master of Arts in political science in 1976. She worked as a policy planning consultant for the New Democratic Party following her graduation, and served as an executive assistant to party leader Ed Broadbent. She also served as women's organizer for the federal NDP during this period.

In 1972, she married Ronald Wayne Leis.

Wasylycia-Leis ran for office three times while living in Ontario, though she was not elected on any of these occasions. In 1977, she ran for the Legislative Assembly of Ontario for the provincial NDP in the riding of Carleton, and received 6,837 votes for a third-place finish. She ran for the seat again in a 1980 by-election and the 1981 general election, and again placed third on each occasion.

== Manitoba legislature ==
Wasylycia-Leis moved to Manitoba during the 1980s, where she worked as an executive assistant to Premier Howard Pawley and coordinated the Women's Directorate in the Manitoba government.

In the mid 1980s, she decided to challenge longtime incumbent NDP MLA Donald Malinowski for the nomination in the North End Winnipeg riding of St. Johns, which was generally considered a safe seat for the party. "Everyone said it was impossible to beat Father Malinowski," she said. Wasylycia-Leis' campaign for the nomination gained so much momentum that it led Malinowski to drop out of the race. In the end, she won the 1986 provincial election, defeating Progressive Conservative John Baluta by almost two thousand votes.

On April 17, 1986, Wasylycia-Leis was appointed to the Manitoba cabinet as Minister of Culture, Heritage and Recreation with responsibility for Status of Women and the administration of the Manitoba Lotteries Foundation Act. She was relieved of the Status of Women responsibility on September 21, 1987, but retained the other two positions until the Pawley government was defeated in the 1988 provincial election.

Wasylycia-Leis was re-elected in 1988, although by a narrower margin; she defeated Liberal Ruth Oberman, 3,092 votes to 2,480. In the 1990 provincial election, she was re-elected again by a wider margin, defeating Mark Minenko, the incumbent from Seven Oaks, which was eliminated due to redistribution.

== Federal politics ==
Wasylycia-Leis resigned her seat on August 12, 1993, to seek (and win) the federal NDP nomination in the riding of Winnipeg North. The NDP fared poorly in the 1993 election, however, and Wasylycia-Leis lost to Liberal Rey Pagtakhan by almost 10,000 votes. She subsequently became a co-chair of Cho!ces, a Manitoba social-justice coalition. In the 1997 federal election, Wasylycia-Leis ran in the riding of Winnipeg North Centre, and defeated Liberal Judith Optiz Silver, 13,663 votes to 7,801. She was re-elected by a wider margin in the 2000 election. In 2003, she supported Bill Blaikie's campaign to become leader of the federal NDP. Redistribution placed Wasylycia-Leis against Pagtakhan again for the 2004 federal election, in the altered riding of Winnipeg North. On this occasion, Wasylycia-Leis defeated Pagtakhan 12,507 votes to 9,491.

In Parliament, Wasylycia-Leis has focused primarily on issues relating to women (including women's health concerns) and general human rights. She has served as her party's health critic, and was made critic for women's and senior's issues in 2001. She is also an advocate for Israel, and in recent years has been critical of some of her party's foreign policy positions as regards Israel and the Middle East.

Wasylycia-Leis was named Deputy Caucus Chair of the parliamentary NDP on January 30, 2003. On August 2, 2004, she was promoted to caucus chair. In 2003 Wasylycia-Leis was also named the finance critic. In November 2004, Wasylycia-Leis traveled to Ukraine to monitor developments in that country's disputed presidential election.

=== Finance critic ===
She became the centre of a national controversy during the 2006 election campaign. She had contacted the Royal Canadian Mounted Police (RCMP) requesting an investigation into whether or not Liberal Finance Minister Ralph Goodale had illegally leaked information regarding a government announcement on income trusts, so as to benefit certain insiders. Following her request, RCMP Commissioner Giuliano Zaccardelli wrote to Wasylycia-Leis to inform her that the RCMP had commenced a criminal probe into the matter. The letter was delivered to her offices, which were closed for the holidays. When she did not respond to the letter, Zaccardelli called her personally to ask whether or not she had read his letter. Wasylycia-Leis then proceeded to call a press conference to announce that the Liberals were the subject of an RCMP investigation. The effects of this announcement were an almost immediate drop in Liberal popularity and surge in Conservative momentum, as indicated by public-opinion polls. The letter from Zaccardelli to Wasylycia-Leis remains controversial, as it went against standard RCMP policy by publicly announcing that a criminal investigation is being conducted. The controversy is deepened by the timing of the announcement to coincide with a federal election campaign. On February 15, 2007, the RCMP announced the conclusion of the income trust investigation and laid a charge of 'Breach of Trust' against Serge Nadeau, an official in the Department of Finance. Goodale was cleared of any wrongdoing. Nevertheless, Wasylycia-Leis called for an apology from Goodale.

Wasylycia-Leis also played a central role in the debate surrounding the introduction of additional tax on Income Trusts in the 'Tax Fairness Plan' introduced by Finance Minister Jim Flaherty on October 31, 2006.

On September 27, 2007, Jack Layton replaced Wasylycia-Leis with Thomas Mulcair as the NDP finance critic. Wasylycia-Leis became caucus chair, and her critic portfolios included health and persons with disabilities. She was re-elected again in the 2008 federal election.

== Race for mayor of Winnipeg ==
On April 27, 2010, Wasylycia-Leis announced her retirement from federal politics, effective May 1, without announcing her future plans. On May 3, she filed papers to run as Mayor of Winnipeg in the October 2010 municipal elections. Sharon Carstairs, a Liberal Senator and the former leader of the Manitoba Liberal Party was announced to be her campaign co-chair and Nicole Campbell, a national representative of the Canadian Union of Public Employees, was enlisted as her campaign manager.

Even before she announced her candidacy, she pledged that if she won, she would donate her MP's pension to charity; she would have preferred to simply return it, but this is not possible. During her term as a federal MP, she similarly declined her pension as a provincial MLA.

Wasylycia-Leis lost to the incumbent, Sam Katz, by 25,395 votes.

In 2014, Wasylycia-Leis came second in the mayoral race, losing to Brian Bowman.

Wasylycia-Leis endorsed Alberta MP Heather McPherson in the 2026 New Democratic Party leadership election.

== Electoral record ==
=== Federal ===
1993 Canadian federal election
Party	Candidate	Votes	%	±%
Liberal	Rey Pagtakhan	22,180	51.2%	+12.9%
New Democratic	Judy Wasylycia-Leis	13,706	31.7%	-2.5%
Reform	Mike Wiens	4,124	9.5%	+7.7%
Progressive Conservative	Lynn Filbert	1,992	4.6%	-20.0%
National	Anna Polonyi	767	1.8%	
Natural Law	Federico Papetti	211	0.5%	
Independent	Mary Stanley	184	0.4%	
Canada Party	Joe Lynch	135	0.3%	
Total valid votes		43,299	100.0%	

1997 Canadian federal election
Party	Candidate	Votes
New Democratic	WASYLYCIA-LEIS, Judy	13,663
Liberal	SILVER, Judy	7,801
Reform	WIENS, Mike	3,678
Progressive Conservative	LARKIN, Marni	1,742
Natural Law	INNES, Elizabeth	169
Marxist–Leninist	SEGAL, Sharon	128

2000 Canadian federal election
Party	Candidate	Votes
New Democratic	WASYLYCIA-LEIS, Judy	14,356
Liberal	RICHARD, Mary	6,755
Progressive Conservative	TRONIAK, Myron	2,950
Communist	RANKIN, Darrell	525

2004 Canadian federal election
Party	Candidate	Votes	%	±%	Expenditures
New Democratic	Judy Wasylycia-Leis	12,507	48.2%	–	$49,921
Liberal	Rey Pagtakhan	9,491	36.6%	–	$66,996
Conservative	Kris Stevenson	3,186	12.3%	–	$10,733
Green	Alon Weinberg	531	2.0%	–	$2,287
Christian Heritage	Eric Truijen	141	0.5%	–	$1,000
Communist	Darrell Rankin	111	0.4%	–	$654
Total valid votes		25,967	100.0%		
Total rejected ballots		128	0.5%		
Turnout		26,095	47.1%		

2006 Canadian federal election
Party	Candidate	Votes	%	±%	Expenditures
New Democratic	Judy Wasylycia-Leis	15,582	57.2%	+9.0%	$52,916
Liberal	Parmjeet Gill	5,752	21.1%	-15.5%	$64,979
Conservative	Garreth McDonald	4,810	17.6%	5.3%	N/A
Green	David Carey	779	2.9%	+0.9%	$398
Christian Heritage	Eric Truijen	207	0.8%	+0.3%	N/A
Communist	Darrell Rankin	123	0.5%	+0.1%	$295
Total valid votes		27,253	100.0%		
Total rejected ballots		137			
Turnout		27,390			

2008 Canadian federal election: Winnipeg North
Party	Candidate	Votes	%	±%	Expenditures
New Democratic	Judy Wasylycia-Leis	14,097	62.6	+5.4	$55,724
Conservative	Ray Larkin	5,033	22.4	+4.8	$6,136
Liberal	Marcelle Marion	2,075	9.2	−11.9	$13,525
Green	Catharine Johannson	1,077	4.8	+1.9	$491
Communist	Frank Komarniski	151	0.7	+0.2	$622
People's Political Power	Roger F. Poisson	90	0.4	N/A	$4,416
Total valid votes/expense limit		22,523	100.0%	$75,935	
Total rejected ballots		–	–		
Turnout		–	%		

=== Municipal ===
2010 Winnipeg Mayoral
Candidate	Votes	%
(x) Sam Katz	116,308	54.8
Judy Wasylycia-Leis	90,913	42.8
Brad Gross	3,398	1.68
Rav Gill	1,775	0.8

2014 Winnipeg Mayoral
Candidate	Votes	%
(x) Brian Bowman	111,504	47.54
Judy Wasylycia-Leis	58,440	24.29
Robert-Falcon Ouellette	36,823	15.70
Gord Steeves	21,080	8.99
David Sanders	3,718	1.59
Paula Havixbeck	2,083	0.89
Michel Fillion	898	0.38

== See also ==
- List of University of Waterloo people

Political offices
Preceded by Muriel Smith	Manitoba Minister responsible for Status of Women; April 17, 1986 – September 21, 1987	Succeeded by Muriel Smith
Preceded by Eugene Kostyra	Manitoba Minister of Culture, Heritage and Recreation; April 17, 1986 – May 9, 1988	Succeeded by Bonnie Mitchelson
Preceded by Eugene Kostyra as Minister responsible for Manitoba Lotteries Foundation	Manitoba Minister charged with the administration of the Manitoba Lotteries Foundation Act; April 17, 1986 – May 9, 1988	Succeeded by Bonnie Mitchelson as Minister responsible for Manitoba Lotteries Foundation Act
Parliament of Canada
Preceded by Rey Pagtakhan	Member of Parliament for Winnipeg North Centre; September 22, 1997 – June 28, 2004	Constituency dissolved
New constituency	Member of Parliament for Winnipeg North; June 28, 2004 – April 30, 2010	Succeeded by Kevin Lamoureux
Preceded by Paul Macklin	Vice-Chair of the Standing Joint; Committee for the Scrutiny of Regulations; November 4, 2004 – November 29, 2005; Served alongside: Lynn Myers	Succeeded by Trevor Eyton; Paul Szabo
Preceded by Christiane Gagnon	Second Vice-Chair of the House of Commons; Standing Committee on Health; February 3, 2009 – April 30, 2010	Succeeded by Luc Malo
Legislative Assembly of Manitoba
Preceded by Don Malinowski	Member of the Legislative Assembly for St. Johns; 1986–1993	Succeeded by Gord Mackintosh
Party political offices
Preceded by Dick Proctor	New Democratic Party Caucus Chair; August 2004 – January 19, 2009	Succeeded by Jean Crowder
