= Saul Cherniack =

Canadian politician (1917–2018)

The Honourable Saul Cherniack PC CM OM QC

Manitoba Minister of Finance
- In office May 2, 1973 – January 8, 1975
- Premier: Edward Schreyer
- Preceded by: Edward Schreyer
- Succeeded by: Edward Schreyer
- In office July 17, 1969 – November 13, 1972
- Premier: Edward Schreyer
- Preceded by: Gurney Evans
- Succeeded by: Edward Schreyer

Member of the Legislative Assembly of Manitoba for St. Johns
- In office December 14, 1962 – November 17, 1981
- Preceded by: David Orlikow
- Succeeded by: Donald Malinowski

Metro Winnipeg Councillor
- In office 1960–1962

Member of the Winnipeg City Council
- In office 1959–1960

Personal details
- Born: January 10, 1917 Winnipeg, Manitoba, Canada
- Died: March 30, 2018 (aged 101) Winnipeg, Manitoba, Canada
- Party: New Democratic Party
- Other political affiliations: Co-operative Commonwealth Federation
- Spouse: Sybil Claire Zeal (m. 1938; died 1997)
- Domestic partner: Myra Wolch (ca. 2007–2018)
- Relations: David Orlikow (cousin)
- Children: 2 sons
- Education: University of Manitoba
- Profession: Lawyer

Military service
- Allegiance: Canada
- Branch/service: Canadian Army
- Years of service: 1943–1946
- Rank: Captain

Saul Mark Cherniack, PC CM OM QC (January 10, 1917 – March 30, 2018) was a Canadian lawyer and politician. He was a member of the Legislative Assembly of Manitoba from 1962 to 1981, and served as a cabinet minister in the government of Edward Schreyer. He was also a member of the Privy Council, the Order of Canada and the Order of Manitoba.

== Early life and career ==
Cherniack's grandfather, who was a dealer of Judaica, emigrated to Canada from Russia and then brought over Cherniack's grandmother, father, and aunt in 1905; Cherniack was politician David Orlikow's first cousin.

Cherniack was born in Winnipeg, Manitoba. His parents, Joseph Alter Cherniack and Fanya Golden, had been revolutionaries in Russia and had been briefly imprisoned before coming to Canada in 1905. Alter Cherniack became a prominent member of Winnipeg's Jewish community and leading supporter of the Independent Labour Party and Co-operative Commonwealth Federation in the city's north end. Alter Cherniack was a watchmaker by training but eventually earned his BA and law degree in Canada and became law partners with Malick Spivak whose son, Sidney Spivak, would go on to be Leader of the Opposition as leader of the Progressive Conservative Party of Manitoba in the 1970s while Cherniack was in government.

Cherniack's parents helped found the I.L. Peretz School, the first Yiddish day school in North America and were also involved with Yiddish theatre.

Cherniack himself was involved with a left-wing theatre group in the 1930s. He was educated at the University of Manitoba (receiving a law degree in 1939), and was active in the Cooperative Commonwealth Federation and in the Jewish community of Winnipeg. He began practising law in 1940. From 1943 to 1946, he served in the Royal Canadian Artillery and then in the Intelligence Corps of the Canadian Army as a Japanese language specialist, reaching the rank of captain.

After World War II, Cherniack resumed his law practice and was one of three lawyers in Canada who worked on behalf of Japanese Canadians who had been interned during the war years in an attempt to have them paid compensation for property seized from them by the government.

He was elected as a trustee on the Winnipeg School Board in 1950, serving until 1954, and then served as a councillor in the town of Winnipeg Beach in 1958-59, a Winnipeg alderman in 1959-60, and a councillor on the Metropolitan Corporation of Greater Winnipeg from 1960 to 1962. In 1938, he married Sybil Claire Zeal.

In the late 1950s, he served as president of both the Jewish Welfare Fund of Winnipeg and the western branch of the Canadian Jewish Congress.

== Provincial politics ==
He was first elected to the Manitoba legislature in the 1962 provincial election, in the north-end Winnipeg riding of St. Johns. He was re-elected in the elections of 1966, 1969, 1973 and 1977, each time by a significant margin.

In 1968-69, Cherniack was a key figure in the provincial NDP calling for Edward Schreyer to replace Russell Paulley as party leader. He initially considered challenging Paulley himself, but declined, reportedly on the advice of NDP research adviser Doug Rowland. Those who supported Sidney Green contended that Cherniack did not run because of concerns that a Jewish party leader would not have been acceptable to the general public in the late 1960s; they later attributed his lack of support for Green to the same reason. (Russell Doern once quoted Cherniack as saying "I do not believe that Manitoba is ready for a Jewish Premier" in announcing his decision to others in the party.) Cherniack denied that, saying that his decision not to run himself was based on his lack of ambition for power, and his support of Schreyer was based on Schreyer's leadership qualities.

When Sidney Green challenged Paulley for the party leadership in late 1968, Cherniack and seven other MLAs supported Paulley on condition that he stand down the following year in favour of Schreyer. Paulley was confirmed as leader and resigned the following year, at which time Schreyer defeated Green for the party leadership. The NDP under Schreyer formed a minority government following the 1969 election.

== Cabinet minister ==
On July 17, 1969, Cherniack was appointed provincial Minister of Finance. He was also given the Urban Affairs portfolio for a brief period in 1970, and was responsible for amalgamating the suburbs and inner city of Winnipeg into one large municipality, the first such unification in North America. He remained one of Schreyer's most trusted confidantes throughout the 1970s.

During his time in office, Cherniack was respected for his intellectual rigour and integrity, and was known as one of the most dignified members of the Manitoba Assembly. He resigned the finance portfolio on November 13, 1972, returned to office on May 2, 1973, and resigned a second time in January 1975.

When Edward Schreyer resigned as party leader in 1979, Cherniack offered to serve as interim leader until a party convention could be held. He set a number of conditions to this offer, however; those who supported Green contended that he was trying to secure the leadership for either himself or Wilson Parasiuk. At a caucus vote Green and Howard Pawley contested Cherniack's interim leadership, and he received only three votes for the position of interim leader. Howard Pawley, the successful candidate, subsequently named him as the party's deputy leader.

Cherniack announced his retirement from political life in October 1980, saying "I am selfish enough to want a little more private life and have for some time [...] There comes a time in a person's life when he has a right to say I want to be relieved of the burden". Cherniack criticized the Manitoba New Democratic Party's recent leadership divisions in making his announcement, arguing that personality questions were obscuring substantive issues. He remained a member of the legislature until the 1981 election.

== Post-political career ==
After his retirement from politics, Cherniack became chair of Manitoba Hydro, and served as a member of the Security Intelligence Review Committee overseeing the Canadian Security Intelligence Service from 1984 to 1992. Accordingly, he was sworn into the Queen's Privy Council for Canada on November 30, 1984, to enable him access to information restricted under the Official Secrets Act.

Cherniack has also served as national vice-president of the Canadian Jewish Congress. He retired from his legal practice in 2000.

In 1963, his son Howard Cherniack was part of the group that founded the Reformed Druids of North America.

In the 1999 provincial election, his son Lawrie Cherniack ran for the NDP in Fort Garry against Joy Smith, and lost by only 30 votes.

In 2003, he supported Bill Blaikie's campaign to lead the federal New Democratic Party.

Cherniack was a member of both the Order of Canada and the Order of Manitoba.

He turned 100 in January 2017 and died on March 30, 2018, at the age of 101.

== See also ==
=== Archives ===
There is a Saul Mark Cherniack fonds at Library and Archives Canada. The archival reference number is R2112.
