= Jacob Penner =

Canadian politician (1880–1965)

- Penner as a young man
- Born: August 12, 1880; Ekaterinoslav, Ukraine, Russian Empire
- Died: August 28, 1965 (aged 85)
- Occupation: Politician
- Known for: Co-founder of the Social Democratic Party of Canada and Communist Party of Canada
- Children: Roland Penner; Norman Penner

Jacob Penner (August 12, 1880 – August 28, 1965) was a popular international socialist politician in Canada. A founder of the Social Democratic Party of Canada and the Communist Party of Canada, Penner was elected to the Winnipeg city council in 1933. He would remain at that post until 1960, becoming the longest serving elected Communist city council member in North America.

During World War II, Penner would become the first Canadian Communist interned for political security reasons. He would be incarcerated from June 1940 until being granted his release in July 1942.

== Biography ==
=== Early years ===
Jacob Penner was born August 12, 1880, in or near Ekaterinoslav (today's Dnipropetrovsk), Ukraine, then part of the Russian Empire, to a German-speaking Mennonite family. Appalled by the poverty among the peasantry in the Tsarist regime, Penner became a revolutionary socialist at an early age — political activity which forced him to emigrate to Canada in 1904.

Upon arriving in Canada, Penner worked for a time in the fruit orchards of British Columbia. He then moved east to the prairie city of Winnipeg, Manitoba in 1906, where he worked as a clerk and floral designer in a florist firm. It was there that he met his future wife, Rose Shapack, a Jewish Russian immigrant, in 1906 during an address by Emma Goldman at the Winnipeg Radical Club. The pair married in 1912.

Penner would continue to work as a florist until 1917. He then moved to a position as a bookkeeper for the Workers' and Farmers' Cooperative Company in Winnipeg, where he would remain until the early 1930s.

A Marxist, he helped found the Social Democratic Party of Canada and was an opponent of conscription during the Conscription crisis of 1917. Penner was active in the Canadian One Big Union movement (OBU), and played a role as an organiser of the Winnipeg General Strike in 1919.

=== First electoral campaigns ===
In 1921, he participated in the founding of the Communist Party of Canada and was the party's western organiser. That fall he ran as the candidate of the Workers' Alliance, the "legal political party" associated with the underground Communist Party at that time for the House of Commons of Canada in Winnipeg North.

With little hope of winning office in the election, Penner made use of the campaign to advocate for world revolution, not hesitating to declare his allegiance to the Communist International and appealing for the overthrow of capitalism. He declared in a published election statement during the 1921 federal campaign that

"The Communist Revolution can triumph only as a world revolution.... In the years 1917, 1918, 1919, all the powers sought to overthrow Soviet Russia; in 1919 they throttled Soviet Hungary.... The existence of the proletarian dictatorship is in constant danger if the workers of other countries do not rally to its support.... The international solidarity of the proletariat is not merely a toy or a fine phrase for the workers, but a vital necessity, without which the cause of the working class is doomed to destruction."

In the 1921 race, Penner drew a total of 565 votes in the urban Winnipeg North electoral district in a losing campaign.

Penner also stood as a Communist in the 1927 Manitoba provincial election, garnering 2,015 votes on the first count in another losing effort.

=== Communist city council member ===
Penner first ran in a Winnipeg city political race in 1931 when he was selected as the Communist candidate for Mayor of Winnipeg. He would garner 3,954 votes out of 52,572 cast (7.5%), finishing in fourth place in a five candidate race.

Penner would run again in the annual election of 1932. In his second effort at election as Winnipeg Mayor, Penner captured 3,495 votes out of 49,387 ballots cast (7.1%), finishing in last place in a four-person race.

In 1933, after Communist Party Political Committee member Leslie Morris was stricken from the ballot on a legal technicality, Penner was tapped as a Communist candidate for Winnipeg's city council. In the November 1933 election Penner topped all vote-getters in the city's North End to win election, assuming his seat on January 2, 1934. Penner would be regularly re-elected as a Winnipeg alderman, holding the position until 1960, excepting a time during WWII when he was put in a concentration camp for being a Communist. Penner thereby became the longest serving elected Communist alderman in North America.

Penner was very popular among his constituents in the city's impoverished north end and attracted support from across party lines. He was an early advocate of a minimum wage and unemployment insurance and used his political position to campaign for these reforms.

In addition to his service in municipal politics, Penner stood for higher electoral office at least two more times, running again for the provincial legislature in the election of 1932, picking up 1,106 votes in a losing effort, and in the 1958 Manitoba election, in which he received 588 votes running in the St. Johns riding.

When he retired in 1960, fellow Communist Joseph Zuken was elected to succeed him on the Winnipeg City Council. Zuken would serve into the 1980s.

=== Wartime internment ===
September 1942 ad for a public program of the "Communist-Labor Total War Committee" advocating speedy opening of a second front in Europe, featuring a speech by Jacob Penner.

During World War II, Penner became the first Canadian Communist interned for security reasons, being arrested on June 11, 1940 under Regulation 21 of the Defence of Canada Regulations. This allowed for the Minister of Justice, in this case Ernest Lapointe, to order the arrest and detention of individuals deemed dangerous to public safety as prisoners of war. Penner was just beginning his third term of office as an elected member of the Winnipeg City Council at the time of his arrest.

Arrested together with John Naviziwsky as "active and dangerous Communists," Penner was interred in a camp for political prisoners located at Kananaskis, Alberta, outside of Calgary. The pair were held at the Kananaskis internment camp with several hundred Germans suspected of Nazi sympathies.

Penner was unseated from the Winnipeg City Council as a result of his incarceration in a concentration camp, only to be replaced in a by-election by former Communist member of the Winnipeg City Council Martin "Joe" Forkin, who ran of necessity as an "Independent."

Following Soviet entry into the war on the side of the British Empire, France, and the United States in the summer of 1941, Penner's incarceration became a cause célèbre, with Winnipeg politicians from across the political spectrum advocating for his pardon, culminating in Penner's release in July 1942. Following his release, Penner joined his Communist Party associates in advocating publicly for the immediate opening of a second front in Europe to take military pressure off the Soviet Union, which was fighting for its survival in the aftermath of Nazi Germany's Operation Barbarossa.

=== Death and legacy ===
Penner died on August 28, 1965. He was 85 years old at the time of his death.

One son, Roland Penner, joined the Manitoba New Democratic Party and served as the province's Attorney-General in the 1980s. Another son, Norman Penner, was a professor at York University and historian of Canadian radicalism.

== Works ==
- "First Campaign Statement," Winnipeg Tribune, vol. 32, no. 286 (Dec. 2, 1921), pg. 16.
- "Second Campaign Statement," Winnipeg Tribune, vol. 32, no. 287 (Dec. 3, 1921), pg. 9.
- The Crisis in Municipal Government. Toronto: Progress Books, 1960.
