= June Westbury =

Canadian politician (1921–2004)

June Alwyn Westbury (née Cantwell; July 26, 1921 – February 11, 2004) was a politician in Manitoba, Canada. She was a member of the Legislative Assembly of Manitoba from 1979 to 1981, sitting as a Liberal.

Westbury was born, in Hamilton, New Zealand. The daughter of Philip William Cantwell and Doris Myrtle "Dolly" Halcrow, Westbury was educated at Brian's College in Auckland, New Zealand, worked for the Auckland Savings Bank and moved to Canada in 1947. In 1949, she married Peter Westbury. She served as a Winnipeg city councillor from 1971 to 1979, and was associated with the Independent Citizens' Election Committee. She served as Vice-President of the Liberal Party of Canada from 1970 to 1973, and was a member of the regional and national executives of the Canadian Council of Christians and Jews.

She first ran for election to the Manitoba legislature in the provincial election of 1973, but lost to New Democrat Ian Turnbull by over 1,500 votes in the central Winnipeg riding of Osborne.

When Lloyd Axworthy resigned his seat in 1979, Westbury ran to succeed him in the riding of Fort Rouge, and defeating New Democrat Vic Savino by 368 votes. For the next two years, Westbury was the only Liberal MLA in the legislature. She was chosen Woman of the Year in Political and Government Affairs in 1979.

The Manitoba Liberal Party saw its support decline to historic lows in the early 1980s, and Westbury was defeated by New Democrat Roland Penner by almost 2,000 votes in the provincial election of 1981. She did not seek a return to elected office after this time, but assisted Liberal leader Sharon Carstairs in the election of 1988.

Westbury was known as a supporter of the arts within Winnipeg, and worked to make the Legislative Building of Manitoba fully accessible to female members. She was a supporter of the Manitoba Opera Association, as well as the Royal Winnipeg Ballet.

When Videon applied to the Community Committee in 1977 to request television recording equipment be allowed, Westbury was quoted as saying "I support the idea because the more coverage we have, the more community involvement we can hope for."

She died at the Convalescent Home of Winnipeg at the age of 82.
