= Edward James McMurray =

Canadian politician

The Honourable Edward James McMurray PC QC
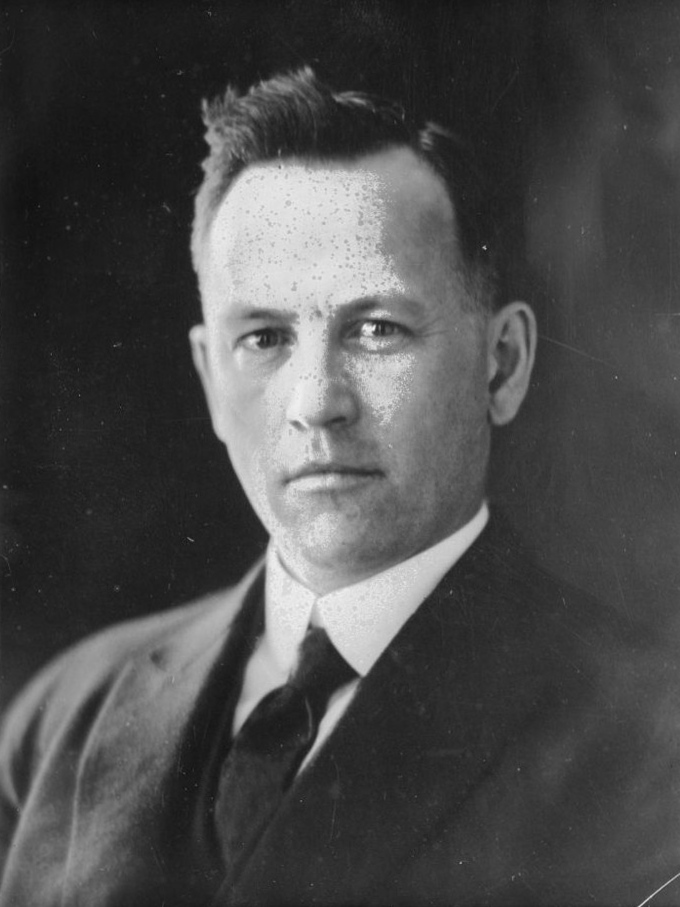
- McMurray, c. 1925

Member of the Canadian Parliament for Winnipeg North
- In office 1921–1925
- Preceded by: Matthew Robert Blake
- Succeeded by: Abraham Albert Heaps

Personal details
- Born: June 4, 1878 Thorndale, Ontario
- Died: April 20, 1969 (aged 90)
- Party: Liberal
- Cabinet: Solicitor General of Canada (1923–1925)

Edward James McMurray PC QC (June 4, 1878 – April 20, 1969) was a Canadian politician.

Born in Thorndale, Ontario, he was elected to the House of Commons of Canada in the Manitoba riding of Winnipeg North in the 1921 federal election. A Liberal, he was defeated in 1925. From 1923 to 1925, he was the Solicitor General of Canada.
