= Gord Mackintosh =

Canadian politician (born 1955)

Minister of Conservation and Water Stewardship
- In office January 13, 2012 – May 3, 2016
- Premier: Greg Selinger
- Preceded by: Dave Chomiak

Manitoba Minister of Family Services and Consumer Affairs
- In office November 3, 2009 – January 13, 2012
- Premier: Greg Selinger
- Preceded by: new portfolio
- Succeeded by: portfolio abolished

Manitoba Minister of Family Services and Housing
- In office September 21, 2006 – November 3, 2009
- Premier: Gary Doer
- Preceded by: Christine Melnick
- Succeeded by: Kerri Irvin-Ross Portfolio renamed Minister of Housing and Community Development

Manitoba Minister of Justice and Attorney General
- In office October 5, 1999 – September 21, 2006
- Premier: Gary Doer
- Preceded by: Vic Toews
- Succeeded by: David Chomiak
- In office April 29, 2015 – May 3, 2016
- Premier: Greg Selinger
- Preceded by: James Allum
- Succeeded by: Heather Stefanson

Manitoba Government House Leader
- In office October 5, 1999 – September 21, 2006
- Premier: Gary Doer
- Preceded by: Darren Praznik
- Succeeded by: David Chomiak

Member of the Legislative Assembly of Manitoba for St. Johns
- In office September 21, 1993 – April 19, 2016
- Preceded by: Judy Wasylycia-Leis
- Succeeded by: Nahanni Fontaine

Personal details
- Born: Gordon Henry Alexander Mackintosh; July 7, 1955 (age 71) Fort Frances, Ontario
- Party: New Democratic Party
- Education: University of Manitoba

Gordon Henry Alexander Mackintosh (born July 7, 1955) is a former Canadian politician who represented the riding of St. Johns in the Legislative Assembly of Manitoba from 1993 to 2016. He served as a cabinet minister in the New Democratic Party governments of Gary Doer and Greg Selinger.

== Early life and career ==
Mackintosh was born in Fort Frances, Ontario, and was educated at the University of Manitoba. Before entering politics, Mackintosh worked for the Canadian Human Rights Commission and the Manitoba Human Rights Commission between 1979 and 1984, and also worked as Deputy Clerk of the Manitoba Legislature from 1980 to 1984. He was called to the bar in 1988, served as chair of the Patient's Rights Committee from 1986 to 1992, and was a member of the Rainbow Society and the Manitoba Anti-Poverty Organization. In his legal career, he specialized in environmental issues, and was also an assistant to Elijah Harper during the Meech Lake constitutional debates of 1990.

== Political career ==
Mackintosh entered provincial politics in September 1993, winning a by-election in the north Winnipeg riding of St. Johns (replacing Judy Wasylycia-Leis, who resigned to run for the federal House of Commons). Mackintosh won 3232 votes, compared to 878 for his nearest opponent, Liberal Naty Yenkech. In the provincial election of 1995, Mackintosh was re-elected in St. Johns with 4513 votes, against 1610 for Liberal Bron Gorski. The general election was won by Gary Filmon's Progressive Conservatives, and Mackintosh joined 22 other New Democrats in the official opposition.

The New Democrats won the election of 1999, and Mackintosh was re-elected in his own riding. On October 5, he was appointed Minister of Justice and Attorney General and Keeper of the Great Seal with responsibility for Constitutional Affairs, and was also named NDP House Leader. On January 17, 2001, he was charged with responsibility for the Manitoba Public Insurance Corporation Act.

As Attorney General, Mackintosh oversaw the extension of children's rights in the legal system, and supported the creation of Cybertip.ca by Child Find Manitoba to report on online predators and child pornography. In addition, Mackintosh oversaw new initiatives in aboriginal and community justice, and made efforts to target organized crime in Manitoba. On November 1, 2004, Mackintosh's department announced that it would introduce tough anti-gang legislation, which would permit the province to confiscate the assets of suspected gang members even if no criminal convictions have occurred.

In 2003, Mackintosh supported Bill Blaikie's candidacy to become leader of the federal New Democratic Party. The New Democrats were re-elected, and Mackintosh was returned in St. Johns with over 72% of the vote. In September 2006, Mackintosh became Minister of Family Services and Housing, replacing Christine Melnick. Mackintosh was re-elected in the 2007 and 2011 provincial elections.

== Post-political career ==
Mackintosh now teaches political science at the University of Winnipeg.

== Electoral history ==
2011 Manitoba general election: St. Johns
| Party | Candidate | Votes | % | ±% | Expenditures |
|---|---|---|---|---|---|
| New Democratic | Gord Mackintosh | 4,157 | 65.55 | −3.04 | $21,376.44 |
| Progressive Conservative | Ray Larkin | 1,405 | 22.15 | +5.62 | $6,754.40 |
| Green | Alon David Weinberg | 392 | 6.18 | +1.46 | $454.35 |
| Liberal | Trevor Mueller | 348 | 5.49 | −4.32 | $3,058.48 |
| Total valid votes | | 6,302 | | | |
| Rejected and declined votes | | 40 | | | |
| Turnout | | 6,342 | 48.34 | | |
| Registered voters | | 13,119 | | | |
Source: Elections Manitoba

2007 Manitoba general election: St. Johns
| Party | Candidate | Votes | % | ±% | Expenditures |
|---|---|---|---|---|---|
| New Democratic | Gord Mackintosh | 4,223 | 68.59 | −3.81 | $22,084.23 |
| Progressive Conservative | Tim Hooper | 1,018 | 16.53 | +6.04 | $7,896.80 |
| Liberal | Selina Sapong-Beiber | 604 | 9.81 | −2.96 | $4,981.08 |
| Green | Dawn Carey | 291 | 4.72 | −0.93 | $39.55 |
| Total valid votes | | 6,136 | 99.67 | | |
| Rejected and declined votes | | 21 | | | |
| Turnout | | 6,157 | 51.44 | +3.72 | |
| Registered voters | | 11,969 | | | |

2003 Manitoba general election: St. Johns
| Party | Candidate | Votes | % | ±% | Expenditures |
|---|---|---|---|---|---|
| New Democratic | Gord Mackintosh | 4,224 | 72.40 | +0.83 | $13,571.43 |
| Liberal | Ed Kolodziej | 745 | 12.77 | +5.24 | $4041.92 |
| Progressive Conservative | E. Ray Garnett | 612 | 10.49 | −9.81 | $967.69 |
| Green | Alon Weinberg | 221 | 3.79 | +3.79 | $532.73 |
| Libertarian | Chris Buors | 32 | 0.55 | +0.55 | $0.00 |
| Total valid votes | | 5,834 | 100.00 | | |
| Rejected and declined votes | | 43 | | | |
| Turnout | | 5,877 | 47.72 | | |
| Registered voters | | 12,315 | | | |

1999 Manitoba general election: St. Johns
| Party | Candidate | Votes | % | ±% | Expenditures |
|---|---|---|---|---|---|
| New Democratic | Gord Mackintosh | 5,776 | 71.57 | | $22,442.00 |
| Progressive Conservative | Ray Larkin | 1,635 | 20.3 | | $14,847.38 |
| Liberal | Patrick Fontaine | 607 | 7.53 | – | $5,400.00 |
| Total valid votes | | 8,008 | 100.00 | | |
| Rejected and declined votes | | 43 | | | |
| Turnout | | 8,056 | 65.1 | | |
| Registered voters | | 12,374 | | | |

Manitoba provincial by-election, September 21, 1993: St. Johns Resignation of Judy Wasylycia-Leis
| Party | Candidate | Votes | % |
|---|---|---|---|
| New Democratic | Gord Mackintosh | 3,232 | 67.11 |
| Liberal | Naty Yankech | 878 | 18.23 |
| Progressive Conservative | June Robertson | 465 | 9.66 |
| Progressive | Neil Schipper | 241 | 5.00 |
| Total valid votes | | 4,816 | 100 |
| Rejected and declined ballots | | 34 | |
| Turnout | | 4,850 | 44.48 |
| Electors on the lists | | 10,903 | |

Political offices
| Preceded by Himself as Manitoba Minister of Family Services and Housing | Manitoba Minister of Family Services and Consumer Affairs; November 3, 2009 – May 3, 2016 | |
| Preceded by Christine Melnick | Manitoba Minister of Family Services and Housing; September 21, 2006 – November 3, 2009 | Succeeded by Himself as Manitoba Minister of Family Services and Consumer Affairs |
| Preceded by Christine Melnick | Manitoba Minister of Family Services and Housing; September 21, 2006 – November 3, 2009 | Succeeded by Kerri Irvin-Ross as Manitoba Minister of Housing and Community Development |
| Preceded by Vic Toews | Manitoba Minister of Justice and Attorney General; October 5, 1999 – September 21, 2006 | Succeeded by Dave Chomiak |
| Preceded by Darren Praznik | Manitoba Government House Leader; October 5, 1999 – September 21, 2006 | Succeeded by Dave Chomiak |
Legislative Assembly of Manitoba
| Preceded by Judy Wasylycia-Leis | Member of the Legislative Assembly for St. Johns; September 21, 1993 – April 19, 2016 | Succeeded by Nahanni Fontaine |
