= Alistair Stewart =

Canadian politician

Alistair McLeod Stewart
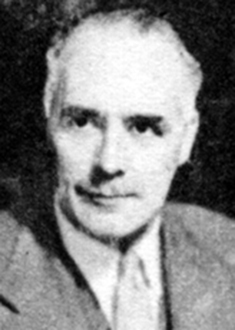

Member of Parliament for Winnipeg North
- In office June 1945 – March 1958
- Preceded by: Charles Stephen Booth
- Succeeded by: Murray Smith

Personal details
- Born: 2 October 1905 Buckhaven, Scotland, United Kingdom
- Died: 3 April 1970 (aged 64)
- Party: New Democratic; Co-operative Commonwealth Federation
- Profession: chartered accountant

Alistair McLeod Stewart (2 October 1905 – 3 April 1970) was a Co-operative Commonwealth Federation member of the House of Commons of Canada. He was born in Buckhaven, Scotland and became a chartered accountant by career.

He was first elected at the Winnipeg North riding in the 1945 general election, then re-elected for successive terms in 1949, 1953 and 1957. After his final federal term, the 23rd Canadian Parliament, he was defeated at Winnipeg North by Murray Smith in the 1958 Progressive Conservative landslide. In an attempted return to the Commons in 1963 as the New Democratic Party candidate for Winnipeg South Centre, Stewart lost to PC incumbent Gordon Churchill.
