= Winnipeg North—St. Paul =

Former federal electoral district in Manitoba, Canada

Winnipeg North—St. Paul (also known as Winnipeg—St. Paul) was a federal electoral district (or riding) in Manitoba, Canada, that was represented in the House of Commons of Canada from 1997 to 2004.

This riding was created in 1996 as "Winnipeg—St. Paul" from parts of Selkirk—Red River, Winnipeg North and Winnipeg Transcona ridings. It was renamed "Winnipeg North—St. Paul" in 1997. It was abolished in 2003 when it was redistributed into Kildonan—St. Paul and Winnipeg North ridings.

== Election results ==
1997 Canadian federal election
Party	Candidate	Votes
Liberal	PAGTAKHAN, Rey D.	13,524
New Democratic	YERENIUK, Roman	9,487
Reform	LEWIS, Terry	7,108
Progressive Conservative	WALL, George	5,430
Christian Heritage	REIMER, David	442
Marxist–Leninist	SINGH, Gurdeep	92

2000 Canadian federal election
Party	Candidate	Votes
Liberal	PAGTAKHAN, Rey D.	14,556
Alliance	SPRAGUE, Trevor	11,412
New Democratic	YERENIUK, Roman	7,931
Progressive Conservative	VUST, Dave	2,959
Green	RHÉAUME, Georgina	232
Canadian Action	COOKE, Cynthia	208
Not affiliated	TRUIJEN, Eric	126
Communist	SIDON, Paul	110

== See also ==
- List of Canadian electoral districts
- Historical federal electoral districts of Canada
