= Charles Stephen Booth =

Canadian politician

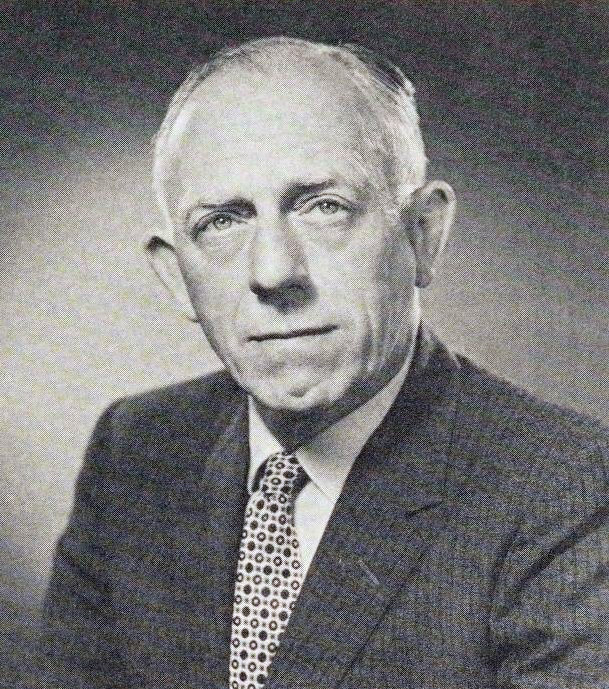

Member of the Canadian Parliament for Winnipeg North
- In office 1940–1945
- Preceded by: Abraham Albert Heaps
- Succeeded by: Alistair Stewart

Personal details
- Born: January 27, 1897 Malvern, Worcestershire, England
- Died: August 30, 1988 (aged 91) Ottawa, Ontario, Canada
- Party: Liberal
- Occupation: Barrister

Charles Stephen Booth CBE ED (January 27, 1897 – August 30, 1988) was a Canadian politician and barrister. He was elected to the House of Commons of Canada as a member of the Liberal Party in 1940 to represent the riding of Winnipeg North. Prior to his federal political experience, he served overseas in the Western University Battalion, Canadian Expeditionary Force then in northern Russia with the Royal Air Force as a pilot and in 1936 he became a lieutenant colonel and commander of the Winnipeg Light Infantry. From there he moved to London, England, where he was placed with the I Canadian Corps Headquarters, and promoted to colonel and assistant deputy adjutant general, then brigadier and deputy adjutant-general.
