= Winnipeg North =

Federal electoral district in Manitoba, Canada

Coordinates: 49.926°N 97.174°W

Manitoba electoral district
- Interactive map of riding boundaries from the 2025 federal election

Federal electoral district
- Legislature: House of Commons
MP
Kevin Lamoureux
Liberal
- District created: 1914
- First contested: 1917
- Last contested: 2025
- District webpage: profile, map

Demographics
- Population (2021): 101,221
- Electors (2021): 62,419
- Area (km²): 37.40
- Pop. density (per km²): 2,706.4
- Census division: Division No. 11
- Census subdivision: Winnipeg (part)

Winnipeg North (French: Winnipeg-Nord) is a federal electoral district in Canada that has been represented in the House of Commons of Canada since 1917. It covers the northern portion of Winnipeg, Manitoba.

== Geography ==
The riding includes the neighbourhoods of Jefferson North, Mandalay West, Maple Glen, Garden City, Jefferson, St. John's, Inkster Faraday, William Whyte, Dufferin, North End, Burrows Central, Robertson, Selkirk, Mynarski, Northwood, Shaughnessy Heights, Lord, Tyndall Park, Garden Grove, Oak Point, Inkster Gardens, Luxton, the south part of The Maples and the north part of Logan CPR in the Winnipeg.

== Demographics ==
Panethnic groups in Winnipeg North (2011−2021)
| Panethnic group | 2021 | | 2016 | | 2011 | |
| Panethnic group | Pop. | % | Pop. | % | Pop. | % |
|---|---|---|---|---|---|---|
| Southeast Asian (Note: Statistic includes total responses of "Filipino" and "Southeast Asian" under visible minority section on census.) | 35,175 | 35.21% | 32,575 | 34.4% | 26,615 | 30.48% |
| European (Note: Statistic includes all persons that did not make up part of a visible minority or an indigenous identity.) | 24,855 | 24.88% | 28,640 | 30.24% | 34,190 | 39.15% |
| South Asian | 17,080 | 17.1% | 10,460 | 11.05% | 5,700 | 6.53% |
| Indigenous | 16,855 | 16.87% | 16,940 | 17.89% | 15,905 | 18.21% |
| African | 2,580 | 2.58% | 2,085 | 2.2% | 1,665 | 1.91% |
| East Asian (Note: Statistic includes total responses of "Chinese", "Korean", and "Japanese" under visible minority section on census.) | 925 | 0.93% | 1,160 | 1.22% | 1,400 | 1.6% |
| Latin American | 585 | 0.59% | 685 | 0.72% | 625 | 0.72% |
| Middle Eastern (Note: Statistic includes total responses of "West Asian" and "Arab" under visible minority section on census.) | 235 | 0.24% | 325 | 0.34% | 270 | 0.31% |
| Other/multiracial (Note: Statistic includes total responses of "Visible minority, n.i.e." and "Multiple visible minorities" under visible minority section on census.) | 1,625 | 1.63% | 1,830 | 1.93% | 970 | 1.11% |
| Total responses | 99,910 | 98.7% | 94,700 | 98.98% | 87,325 | 98.54% |
| Total population | 101,221 | 100% | 95,676 | 100% | 88,616 | 100% |
Notes: Totals greater than 100% due to multiple origin responses. Demographics based on 2012 Canadian federal electoral redistribution riding boundaries.

According to the 2021 Canadian census; 2013 representation

Languages: 49.4% English, 18.1% Tagalog, 12.9% Punjabi, 1.2% Portuguese
Religions: 56.2% Christian (37.8% Catholic, 1.6% Anglican, 1.5% United Church, 1.3% Pentecostal, 1% Baptist), 24.3% No religion, 14.2% Sikh, 2% Hindu, 1.2% Buddhist
Median income (2020): $34,800
Average income (2010): $38,760

Winnipeg North is the riding with:

- The highest % of people of Filipino ethnic origin (31.1%)
- The highest % of people belonging to the Filipino visible minority group (33.1%)
- The highest % of native speakers of Tagalog (Pilipino, Filipino) (18.1%)
- The highest % of immigrants from Philippines in the overall population (24.9%)

== History ==
This riding was originally created in 1914 from Winnipeg and Selkirk ridings.

In 1997, it was renamed "Winnipeg North—St. Paul".

In 2003, Winnipeg North—St. Paul was abolished with parts transferred to Winnipeg North, Winnipeg Centre and Kildonan—St. Paul ridings. Winnipeg North was re-created from parts of Winnipeg North—St. Paul and Winnipeg North Centre.

Historically a safe seat for the New Democratic Party, in 2011 Winnipeg North was narrowly retained by Liberal incumbent Kevin Lamoureux in an otherwise dismal performance by the party nationwide. It also holds the distinction of being the only seat flipped by the Liberals in 2011, compared to 2008, when the seat was held by the New Democratic Party. Along with Wascana around Regina, Saskatchewan, Winnipeg North was one of only two seats won by the Liberals in the Prairie Provinces.

This riding gained territory from Kildonan—St. Paul during the 2012 Canadian federal electoral redistribution.

Kevin Lamoureux was re-elected to represent Winnipeg North in the 2015 Canadian federal election, as the Liberals formed a majority government. In 2015, he was the only incumbent MP from Winnipeg to be re-elected. He was re-elected as the Liberals won minority governments in 2019 and 2021.

=== Members of Parliament ===
This riding has elected the following members of Parliament:

| Parliament | Years | Member | Party |
|---|---|---|---|
Winnipeg North; Riding created from Winnipeg and Selkirk
| 13th | 1917–1921 | Matthew Robert Blake | Government (Unionist) |
| 14th | 1921–1925 | Edward James McMurray | Liberal |
| 15th | 1925–1926 | Abraham Albert Heaps | Labour |
| 16th | 1926–1930 | Abraham Albert Heaps | Labour |
| 17th | 1930–1935 | Abraham Albert Heaps | Labour |
| 18th | 1935–1940 | Abraham Albert Heaps | Co-operative Commonwealth |
| 19th | 1940–1945 | Charles Stephen Booth | Liberal |
| 20th | 1945–1949 | Alistair Stewart | Co-operative Commonwealth |
| 21st | 1949–1953 | Alistair Stewart | Co-operative Commonwealth |
| 22nd | 1953–1957 | Alistair Stewart | Co-operative Commonwealth |
| 23rd | 1957–1958 | Alistair Stewart | Co-operative Commonwealth |
| 24th | 1958–1962 | Murray Smith | Progressive Conservative |
| 25th | 1962–1963 | David Orlikow | New Democratic |
| 26th | 1963–1965 | David Orlikow | New Democratic |
| 27th | 1965–1968 | David Orlikow | New Democratic |
| 28th | 1968–1972 | David Orlikow | New Democratic |
| 29th | 1972–1974 | David Orlikow | New Democratic |
| 30th | 1974–1979 | David Orlikow | New Democratic |
| 31st | 1979–1980 | David Orlikow | New Democratic |
| 32nd | 1980–1984 | David Orlikow | New Democratic |
| 33rd | 1984–1988 | David Orlikow | New Democratic |
| 34th | 1988–1993 | Rey Pagtakhan | Liberal |
| 35th | 1993–1997 | Rey Pagtakhan | Liberal |
Riding dissolved into Winnipeg North—St. Paul
Riding re-created from Winnipeg North—St. Paul and Winnipeg North Centre
| 38th | 2004–2006 | Judy Wasylycia-Leis | New Democratic |
| 39th | 2006–2008 | Judy Wasylycia-Leis | New Democratic |
| 40th | 2008–2010 | Judy Wasylycia-Leis | New Democratic |
| 40th | 2010–2011 | Kevin Lamoureux | Liberal |
| 41st | 2011–2015 | Kevin Lamoureux | Liberal |
| 42nd | 2015–2019 | Kevin Lamoureux | Liberal |
| 43rd | 2019–2021 | Kevin Lamoureux | Liberal |
| 44th | 2021–2025 | Kevin Lamoureux | Liberal |
| 45th | 2025–present | Kevin Lamoureux | Liberal |

== Election results ==
=== Winnipeg North, 2004–present ===
Graph of election results in Winnipeg North (minor parties that never got 2% of the vote or didn't run consistently are omitted) View source data.

2025 Canadian federal election
** Preliminary results — Not yet official **
| Party | Candidate | Votes | % | ±% | Expenditures |
|---|---|---|---|---|---|
| Liberal | Kevin Lamoureux | 19,326 | 57.79 | +4.58 | |
| Conservative | Rachel Punzalan | 11,508 | 34.41 | +20.92 | |
| New Democratic | Adebayo Akinrogunde | 2,037 | 6.09 | –21.66 | |
| People's | Jessica Bailon | 265 | 0.79 | –3.25 | |
| Green | Angela Brydges | 193 | 0.58 | –0.65 | |
| Communist | Sarah Borbridge | 112 | 0.33 | +0.04 | |
| Total valid votes/expense limit | | | | | |
| Total rejected ballots | | | | | |
| Turnout | | 33,441 | 57.26 | | |
| Eligible voters | | 58,402 | | | |
| Liberal notional hold | | Swing | | –8.17 | |
Source: Elections Canada

2021 federal election redistributed results
| Party | Vote | % |
|---|---|---|
| Liberal | 16,040 | 53.21 |
| New Democratic | 8,365 | 27.75 |
| Conservative | 4,066 | 13.49 |
| People's | 1,219 | 4.04 |
| Green | 370 | 1.23 |
| Others | 87 | 0.29 |

2021 Canadian federal election
| Party | Candidate | Votes | % | ±% | Expenditures |
|---|---|---|---|---|---|
| Liberal | Kevin Lamoureux | 16,442 | 52.3 | +4.7 | $59,209.35 |
| New Democratic | Melissa Chung-Mowat | 8,998 | 28.6 | +2.7 | $55,328.22 |
| Conservative | Anas Kassem | 4,126 | 13.1 | -7.7 | $4,770.97 |
| People's | Patrick Neilan | 1,315 | 4.2 | +3.2 | $0.00 |
| Green | Angela Brydges | 418 | 1.3 | -1.5 | $0.00 |
| Communist | Robert Crooks | 109 | 0.3 | -0.1 | $0.00 |
| Total valid votes/expense limit | | 31,408 | 99.1 | – | $103,513.27 |
| Total rejected ballots | | 287 | 0.9 | | |
| Turnout | | 31,695 | 50.8 | | |
| Eligible voters | | 62,419 | | | |
| Liberal hold | | Swing | | +1.0 | |
Source: Elections Canada

2019 Canadian federal election
| Party | Candidate | Votes | % | ±% | Expenditures |
|---|---|---|---|---|---|
| Liberal | Kevin Lamoureux | 15,581 | 47.60 | -21.30 | $58,222.18 |
| New Democratic | Kyle Mason | 8,469 | 25.87 | +12.50 | none listed |
| Conservative | Jordyn Ham | 6,820 | 20.83 | +5.54 | $1,264.48 |
| Green | Sai Shanthanand Rajagopal | 906 | 2.77 | +0.34 | $503.13 |
| People's | ~~Victor Ong~~ | 324 | 0.99 | -- | $0.00 |
| Christian Heritage | Henry Hizon | 279 | 0.85 | -- | none listed |
| Independent | Kathy Doyle | 231 | 0.71 | -- | none listed |
| Communist | Andrew Taylor | 125 | 0.38 | -- | none listed |
| Total valid votes/expense limit | | 32,735 | 99.26 | | |
| Total rejected ballots | | 243 | 0.74 | -0.05 | |
| Turnout | | 32,978 | 51.79 | -6.66 | |
| Eligible voters | | 63,681 | | | |
| Liberal hold | | Swing | | -16.90 | |
Source: Elections Canada
Victor Ong was nominated by the People's Party, but resigned on 8 October. As the deadline had passed, his name remained on the ballot.

2015 Canadian federal election
| Party | Candidate | Votes | % | ±% | Expenditures |
|---|---|---|---|---|---|
| Liberal | Kevin Lamoureux | 23,402 | 68.90 | +33.91 | $83,435.85 |
| Conservative | Harpreet Turka | 5,193 | 15.29 | -12.07 | $35,641.92 |
| New Democratic | Levy Abad | 4,543 | 13.38 | -22.02 | $25,774.97 |
| Green | John Redekopp | 826 | 2.43 | +0.65 | $833.17 |
| Total valid votes/expense limit | | 33,964 | 99.21 | | $193,725.29 |
| Total rejected ballots | | 269 | 0.79 | – | |
| Turnout | | 34,233 | 58.45 | | |
| Eligible voters | | 58,573 | | | |
| Liberal notional gain from New Democratic | | Swing | | +27.97 | |
Source: Elections Canada

2011 federal election redistributed results
| Party | Vote | % |
|---|---|---|
| New Democratic | 9,440 | 35.40 |
| Liberal | 9,331 | 34.99 |
| Conservative | 7,295 | 27.36 |
| Green | 475 | 1.78 |
| Others | 126 | 0.47 |

2011 Canadian federal election
| Party | Candidate | Votes | % | ±% | Expenditures |
|---|---|---|---|---|---|
| Liberal | Kevin Lamoureux | 9,097 | 35.78 | -10.54 | $75,214.57 |
| New Democratic | Rebecca Blaikie | 9,053 | 35.60 | -5.57 | $71,243.32 |
| Conservative | Ann Matejicka | 6,701 | 26.35 | +15.9 | $40,787.18 |
| Green | John Harvie | 458 | 1.80 | +1.08 | $0.00 |
| Communist | Frank Komarniski | 118 | 0.46 | +0.01 | $502.42 |
| Total valid votes/expense limit | | 25,427 | 100.00 | – | |
| Total rejected ballots | | 136 | 0.53 | -0.04 | |
| Turnout | | 25,563 | 50.01 | +19.2 | |
| Eligible voters | | 51,115 | – | | |
| Liberal hold | | Swing | | -4.97 | |

Canadian federal by-election, 29 November 2010
| Party | Candidate | Votes | % | ±% | Expenditures |
|---|---|---|---|---|---|
| Liberal | Kevin Lamoureux | 7,303 | 46.32 | +37.10 | $74,020.45 |
| New Democratic | Kevin Chief | 6,490 | 41.17 | -21.44 | $64,585.69 |
| Conservative | Julie Javier | 1,647 | 10.45 | -11.90 | $53,166.90 |
| Green | John Harvie | 114 | 0.72 | -4.03 | $1,410.65 |
| Pirate | Jeff Coleman | 94 | 0.60 | – | $62.08 |
| Communist | Frank Komarniski | 71 | 0.45 | -0.22 | $192.32 |
| Christian Heritage | Eric Truijen | 46 | 0.29 | – | $1,790 |
| Total valid votes/Expense limit | | 15,765 | 100.00 | | $77,132 |
| Total rejected ballots | | 91 | 0.57 | +0.07 | |
| Turnout | | 15,856 | 30.8 | -12 | |
| Eligible voters | | N/A | – | | |
Due to the resignation of Judy Wasylycia-Leis on 30 April 2010
| Liberal gain from New Democratic | | Swing | | +29.27 | |

2008 Canadian federal election
| Party | Candidate | Votes | % | ±% | Expenditures |
|---|---|---|---|---|---|
| New Democratic | Judy Wasylycia-Leis | 14,097 | 62.6 | +5.4 | $55,724 |
| Conservative | Ray Larkin | 5,033 | 22.4 | +4.8 | $6,136 |
| Liberal | Marcelle Marion | 2,075 | 9.2 | −11.9 | $13,525 |
| Green | Catharine Johannson | 1,077 | 4.8 | +1.9 | $491 |
| Communist | Frank Komarniski | 151 | 0.7 | +0.2 | $622 |
| People's Political Power | Roger F. Poisson | 90 | 0.4 | N/A | $4,416 |
| Total valid votes/expense limit | | 22,523 | 100.0% | $75,935 | |
| Total rejected ballots | | – | – | | |
| Turnout | | – | % | | |

2006 Canadian federal election
| Party | Candidate | Votes | % | ±% | Expenditures |
|---|---|---|---|---|---|
| New Democratic | Judy Wasylycia-Leis | 15,582 | 57.18 | +9.02 | $53,357.55 |
| Liberal | Parmjeet Gill | 5,752 | 21.11 | −15.44 | $64,979.49 |
| Conservative | Garreth McDonald | 4,810 | 17.65 | +5.38 | $5,321.33 |
| Green | David Carey | 779 | 2.86 | +0.82 | $397.50 |
| Christian Heritage | Eric Truijen | 207 | 0.76 | +0.22 | |
| Communist | Darrell Rankin | 123 | 0.45 | +0.02 | $295.28 |
| Total valid votes | | 27,253 | 100.00 | | |
| Rejected ballots | | 137 | | | |
| Turnout | | 27,390 | 50.91 | +3.78 | |
| Electors on the lists | | 53,805 | | | |
Sources: Official Results, Elections Canada and Financial Returns, Elections Canada.

2004 Canadian federal election
| Party | Candidate | Votes | % | ±% | Expenditures |
|---|---|---|---|---|---|
| New Democratic | Judy Wasylycia-Leis | 12,507 | 48.16 | +1.53 | $34,948.23 |
| Liberal | Rey Pagtakhan | 9,491 | 36.55 | +0.04 | $61,961.93 |
| Conservative | Kris Stevenson | 3,186 | 12.27 | −2.56 | $9,148.61 |
| Green | Alon Weinberg | 531 | 2.04 | | $2,287.45 |
| Christian Heritage | Eric Truijen | 141 | 0.54 | | $1,000.00 |
| Communist | Darrell Rankin | 111 | 0.43 | | $654.58 |
| Total valid votes | | 25,967 | 100.00 | | |
| Rejected ballots | | 128 | | | |
| Turnout | | 26,095 | 47.13 | | |
| Electors on the lists | | 55,372 | | | |
Percentage change figures are factored for redistribution. Conservative Party percentages are contrasted with the combined Canadian Alliance and Progressive Conservative percentages from 2000.
Sources: Official Results, Elections Canada and Financial Returns, Elections Canada.

=== Winnipeg North, 1917–1993 ===
Graph of election results in Winnipeg North (1917-1993, minor parties that never got 2% of the vote or didn't run consistently are omitted) View source data.

1993 Canadian federal election
| Party | Candidate | Votes | % | ±% |
|---|---|---|---|---|
| Liberal | Rey Pagtakhan | 22,180 | 51.2 | +12.9 |
| New Democratic | Judy Wasylycia-Leis | 13,706 | 31.7 | -2.5 |
| Reform | Mike Wiens | 4,124 | 9.5 | +7.7 |
| Progressive Conservative | Lynn Filbert | 1,992 | 4.6 | -20.0 |
| National | Anna Polonyi | 767 | 1.8 | |
| Natural Law | Federico Papetti | 211 | 0.5 | |
| Independent | Mary Stanley | 184 | 0.4 | |
| Canada Party | Joe Lynch | 135 | 0.3 | |
| Total valid votes | | 43,299 | 100.0 | |

1988 Canadian federal election
| Party | Candidate | Votes | % | ±% |
|---|---|---|---|---|
| Liberal | Rey Pagtakhan | 16,375 | 38.3 | +13.5 |
| New Democratic | David Orlikow | 14,612 | 34.2 | -9.1 |
| Progressive Conservative | Norman Perry Isler | 10,527 | 24.6 | -5.6 |
| Reform | Ritchie W. Gural | 793 | 1.9 | |
| Independent | Stephen Keki | 214 | 0.5 | |
| Communist | Frank Goldspink | 150 | 0.4 | -0.3 |
| Independent | Gurdeep Singh | 79 | 0.2 | |
| Total valid votes | | 42,750 | 100.0 | |

1984 Canadian federal election
| Party | Candidate | Votes | % | ±% |
|---|---|---|---|---|
| New Democratic | David Orlikow | 18,209 | 43.3 | -7.2 |
| Progressive Conservative | Luba Fedorkiw | 12,705 | 30.2 | +7.6 |
| Liberal | Chris Lorenc | 10,421 | 24.8 | -1.1 |
| Communist | Paula Fletcher | 283 | 0.7 | +0.1 |
| Independent | William Hawryluk | 243 | 0.6 | |
| Independent | E.T. Dolski | 180 | 0.4 | |
| Total valid votes | | 42,041 | 100.0 | |

1980 Canadian federal election
| Party | Candidate | Votes | % | ±% |
|---|---|---|---|---|
| New Democratic | David Orlikow | 18,561 | 50.5 | -2.2 |
| Liberal | Walter Hlady | 9,517 | 25.9 | +7.1 |
| Progressive Conservative | Roy Koniuk | 8,313 | 22.6 | -5.0 |
| Communist | William C. Ross | 195 | 0.5 | 0.0 |
| Marxist–Leninist | Brian Ostrow | 149 | 0.4 | +0.1 |
| Total valid votes | | 36,735 | 100.0 | |

1979 Canadian federal election
| Party | Candidate | Votes | % | ±% |
|---|---|---|---|---|
| New Democratic | David Orlikow | 22,417 | 52.7 | +11.8 |
| Progressive Conservative | Anne Steen | 11,749 | 27.6 | -5.5 |
| Liberal | Walter Hlady | 8,002 | 18.8 | -4.8 |
| Communist | William C. Ross | 242 | 0.6 | -0.5 |
| Marxist–Leninist | Brian Ostrow | 141 | 0.3 | +0.1 |
| Total valid votes | | 42,551 | 100.0 | |

1974 Canadian federal election
| Party | Candidate | Votes | % | ±% |
|---|---|---|---|---|
| New Democratic | David Orlikow | 15,026 | 40.9 | -1.9 |
| Progressive Conservative | Anne Steen | 12,196 | 33.2 | +7.8 |
| Liberal | Robert Parashin | 8,677 | 23.6 | -6.4 |
| Social Credit | William Hawryluk | 410 | 1.1 | |
| Communist | William C. Ross | 390 | 1.1 | -0.5 |
| Marxist–Leninist | Avrum Rosner | 80 | 0.2 | |
| Total valid votes | | 36,779 | 100.0 | |

1972 Canadian federal election
| Party | Candidate | Votes | % | ±% |
|---|---|---|---|---|
| New Democratic | David Orlikow | 15,931 | 42.8 | -2.7 |
| Liberal | Serge Radchuk | 11,150 | 30.0 | -12.7 |
| Progressive Conservative | Anne Steen | 9,446 | 25.4 | +16.0 |
| Independent | W.C. Ross | 587 | 1.6 | -1.0 |
| Independent | C. Aili Waldman | 114 | 0.3 | |
| Total valid votes | | 37,228 | 100.0 | |

1968 Canadian federal election
| Party | Candidate | Votes | % | ±% |
|---|---|---|---|---|
| New Democratic | David Orlikow | 15,608 | 45.5 | -2.2 |
| Liberal | Cecil W. Semchyshyn | 14,645 | 42.7 | +14.8 |
| Progressive Conservative | Gary Raymond Scherbain | 3,206 | 9.3 | -13.5 |
| Communist | W.C. Ross | 869 | 2.5 | |
| Total valid votes | | 34,328 | 100.0 | |

1965 Canadian federal election
| Party | Candidate | Votes | % | ±% |
|---|---|---|---|---|
| New Democratic | David Orlikow | 22,950 | 47.7 | +11.2 |
| Liberal | Robert Taft | 13,420 | 27.9 | -3.8 |
| Progressive Conservative | Walter Paschak | 10,992 | 22.8 | -5.5 |
| Social Credit | Jacob Willms | 771 | 1.6 | -1.8 |
| Total valid votes | | 48,133 | 100.0 | |

1963 Canadian federal election
| Party | Candidate | Votes | % | ±% |
|---|---|---|---|---|
| New Democratic | David Orlikow | 18,512 | 36.5 | -0.2 |
| Liberal | Paul Parashin | 16,081 | 31.7 | +3.0 |
| Progressive Conservative | Don Thompson | 14,391 | 28.4 | +0.2 |
| Social Credit | Nick Halas | 1,729 | 3.4 | -0.1 |
| Total valid votes | | 50,713 | 100.0 | |

1962 Canadian federal election
| Party | Candidate | Votes | % | ±% |
|---|---|---|---|---|
| New Democratic | David Orlikow | 18,236 | 36.7 | -5.3 |
| Liberal | Paul Parashin | 14,270 | 28.7 | +16.4 |
| Progressive Conservative | Murray Smith | 14,000 | 28.1 | -14.3 |
| Social Credit | John De Fehr | 1,733 | 3.5 | |
| Communist | W.C. Ross | 1,504 | 3.0 | -0.2 |
| Total valid votes | | 49,743 | 100.0 | |

Note: NDP vote is compared to CCF vote in 1958 election. Communist vote is compared to Labour-Progressive vote in 1958 election.

1958 Canadian federal election
| Party | Candidate | Votes | % | ±% |
|---|---|---|---|---|
| Progressive Conservative | Murray Smith | 19,629 | 42.4 | +25.9 |
| Co-operative Commonwealth | Alistair Stewart | 19,414 | 42.0 | -6.7 |
| Liberal | Nina Partrick | 5,700 | 12.3 | -11.1 |
| Labor–Progressive | William Cecil Ross | 1,503 | 3.3 | -0.5 |
| Total valid votes | | 46,246 | 100.0 | |

1957 Canadian federal election
| Party | Candidate | Votes | % | ±% |
|---|---|---|---|---|
| Co-operative Commonwealth | Alistair Stewart | 20,354 | 48.7 | -0.5 |
| Liberal | Peter Taraska | 9,806 | 23.5 | -6.4 |
| Progressive Conservative | Murray Smith | 6,905 | 16.5 | +3.8 |
| Social Credit | Nick Halas | 3,161 | 7.6 | |
| Labor–Progressive | William Cecil Ross | 1,579 | 3.8 | -4.5 |
| Total valid votes | | 41,805 | 100.0 | |

1953 Canadian federal election
| Party | Candidate | Votes | % | ±% |
|---|---|---|---|---|
| Co-operative Commonwealth | Alistair Stewart | 15,005 | 49.2 | +9.9 |
| Liberal | Frank Chester | 9,094 | 29.8 | -8.0 |
| Progressive Conservative | John Kereluk | 3,876 | 12.7 | +7.0 |
| Labor–Progressive | Joseph Zuken | 2,515 | 8.2 | -8.9 |
| Total valid votes | | 30,490 | 100.0 | |

1949 Canadian federal election
| Party | Candidate | Votes | % | ±% |
|---|---|---|---|---|
| Co-operative Commonwealth | Alistair Stewart | 12,432 | 39.3 | +1.4 |
| Liberal | Peter Taraska | 11,962 | 37.8 | +12.2 |
| Labor–Progressive | Joseph Zuken | 5,406 | 17.1 | -9.4 |
| Progressive Conservative | John Hunter Restall | 1,816 | 5.7 | -1.8 |
| Total valid votes | | 31,616 | 100.0 | |

1945 Canadian federal election
| Party | Candidate | Votes | % | ±% |
|---|---|---|---|---|
| Co-operative Commonwealth | Alistair Stewart | 13,055 | 37.9 | +2.6 |
| Labor–Progressive | Joseph Zuken | 9,116 | 26.5 | +9.8 |
| Liberal | Peter Taraska | 8,839 | 25.7 | -15.2 |
| Progressive Conservative | William John English | 2,584 | 7.5 | +0.4 |
| Social Credit | Henry Lambert Yonker | 864 | 2.5 | |
| Total valid votes | | 34,458 | 100.0 | |

Note: Labour-Progressive vote is compared to Communist vote in 1940 election. Progressive Conservative vote is compared to "National Government" vote in 1940 election.

1940 Canadian federal election
| Party | Candidate | Votes | % | ±% |
|---|---|---|---|---|
| Liberal | Charles Stephen Booth | 13,015 | 40.9 | +11.6 |
| Co-operative Commonwealth | Abraham Albert Heaps | 11,249 | 35.3 | -6.8 |
| Communist | Leslie Tom Morris | 5,315 | 16.7 | -8.7 |
| National Government | Percy Ellor | 2,255 | 7.1 | |
| Total valid votes | | 31,834 | 100.0 | |

1935 Canadian federal election
| Party | Candidate | Votes | % | ±% |
|---|---|---|---|---|
| Co-operative Commonwealth | Abraham Albert Heaps | 12,093 | 42.2 | -6.9 |
| Liberal | C.S. Booth | 8,412 | 29.3 | +14.0 |
| Communist | Tim Buck | 7,276 | 25.4 | |
| Social Credit | Fred John Welwood | 905 | 3.2 | |
| Total valid votes | | 28,686 | 100.0 | |

1930 Canadian federal election
| Party | Candidate | Votes | % | ±% |
|---|---|---|---|---|
| Labour | Abraham Albert Heaps | 6,907 | 49.0 | -0.1 |
| Conservative | Matthew Robert Blake | 5,011 | 35.6 | +7.3 |
| Liberal | Leslie Morris | 2,164 | 15.4 | -7.1 |
| Total valid votes | | 14,082 | 100.0 | |

1926 Canadian federal election
| Party | Candidate | Votes | % | ±% |
|---|---|---|---|---|
| Labour | Abraham Albert Heaps | 6,171 | 49.2 | +10.1 |
| Conservative | Richard R. Knox | 3,555 | 28.3 | -3.4 |
| Liberal | George Boyd McTavish | 2,821 | 22.5 | -6.7 |
| Total valid votes | | 12,547 | 100.0 | |

1925 Canadian federal election
| Party | Candidate | Votes | % | ±% |
|---|---|---|---|---|
| Labour | Abraham Albert Heaps | 4,781 | 39.1 | +6.5 |
| Conservative | Matthew Robert Blake | 3,882 | 31.7 | |
| Liberal | Edward James McMurray | 3,573 | 29.2 | -35.5 |
| Total valid votes | | 12,236 | 100.0 | |

Canadian federal by-election, 24 October 1923
| Party | Candidate | Votes | % | ±% |
|---|---|---|---|---|
Due to McMurray's appointment to an "office of emolument"
| Liberal | Edward James McMurray | 5,628 | 64.7 | +35.3 |
| Labour | Abraham Albert Heaps | 2,835 | 32.6 | +27.2 |
| Unknown | Paul Gigejczuc | 199 | 2.3 | |
| Unknown | Joseph Martin | 39 | 0.4 | |
| Total valid votes | | 8,701 | 100.0 | |

1921 Canadian federal election
| Party | Candidate | Votes | % | ±% |
|---|---|---|---|---|
| Liberal | Edward James McMurray | 3,809 | 36.2 | +9.8 |
| Socialist | Robert Boyd Russell | 3,094 | 29.4 | |
| Conservative | Matthew Robert Blake | 3,045 | 29.0 | -44.6 |
| Labour | Jacob Penner | 565 | 5.4 | |
| Total valid votes | | 10,513 | 100.0 | |

Note: Conservative vote is compared to Government vote in 1917 election. Liberal vote is compared to Opposition vote in 1711 election.

1917 Canadian federal election
| Party | Candidate | Votes | % |
|---|---|---|---|
| Government (Unionist) | Matthew Robert Blake | 9,656 | 73.6 |
| Opposition (Laurier Liberals) | Richard Arthur Rigg | 3,472 | 26.4 |
| Total valid votes | | 13,128 | 100.0 |

== See also ==
- List of Canadian electoral districts
- Historical federal electoral districts of Canada

== Sources ==
- "Winnipeg North (Code 46012) Census Profile". 2011 census. Government of Canada - Statistics Canada.
- Riding history for Winnipeg North (1914–1997) from the Library of Parliament
- Riding history for Winnipeg North (2003– ) from the Library of Parliament
- Expenditures - 2008
- Expenditures - 2004
