= Matthew Robert Blake =

Canadian politician (1876–1937)

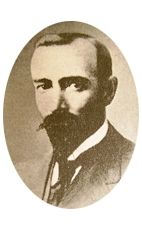

Member of Parliament for Winnipeg North
- In office 1917–1921
- Preceded by: Riding created from Winnipeg and Selkirk merger
- Succeeded by: Edward James McMurray

Personal details
- Born: January 8, 1876 Ashfield, Ontario, Canada
- Died: November 21, 1937 (aged 61) Winnipeg, Manitoba
- Resting place: Elmwood Cemetery, Winnipeg
- Party: Unionist (1917-1921); Conservative Party
- Spouse: Hattie F. Jackson (m. 1906; died 1914)
- Children: 2
- Education: Trinity College; Rotunda Hospital; University College London; King's College London
- Occupation: physician

Matthew Robert Blake (January 8, 1876 – November 21, 1937) was a Canadian politician and soldier.

== Early life ==
Matthew Robert Blake was born on January 8, 1876, in Ashfield, Ontario, Canada. He attended public schools in Belfast and Goderich District Collegiate Institute. He graduated from Trinity College. He then studied medicine and surgery at Rotunda Hospital in Dublin, University College London and King's College London.

== Career ==
Blake practiced medicine in Fort Frances before moving to Winnipeg. Blake was elected as a member of the Unionist Party in the 1917 election. He was defeated in the 1921 election as a candidate for the historical Conservative Party then defeated again in 1925 and in 1930 in the riding of Winnipeg North.

In 1912, Blake helped Colonel Dan McLean raise the 106th Winnipeg Light Infantry Regiment. He received training in CFB Valcartier. He was a captain and medical officer of the regiment. He retired in 1932. In September 1932, he was made an honorary lieutenant colonel of the Winnipeg Light Infantry and received the Canadian efficiency medal for his service as an officer. He practiced medicine in North Winnipeg for 35 years. He was a member of the Royal College of Surgeons of London and was a licentiate of the Royal College of Physicians of London. He was an executive of the Dominion Medical Association.

== Personal life ==
Blake married Hattie F. Jackson in 1906. She died in 1914. They had one son and daughter, Daniel and Margaret Elizabeth. He lived on Burrows Avenue in Winnipeg. He attended St. Giles United Church.

Blake had a stroke at the Garrison officers' ball on November 12, 1937. He moved to St. Boniface Hospital and died there on November 21. He was buried in Elmwood Cemetery.
