= A. A. Heaps =

Canadian politician and labour leader (1885–1954)

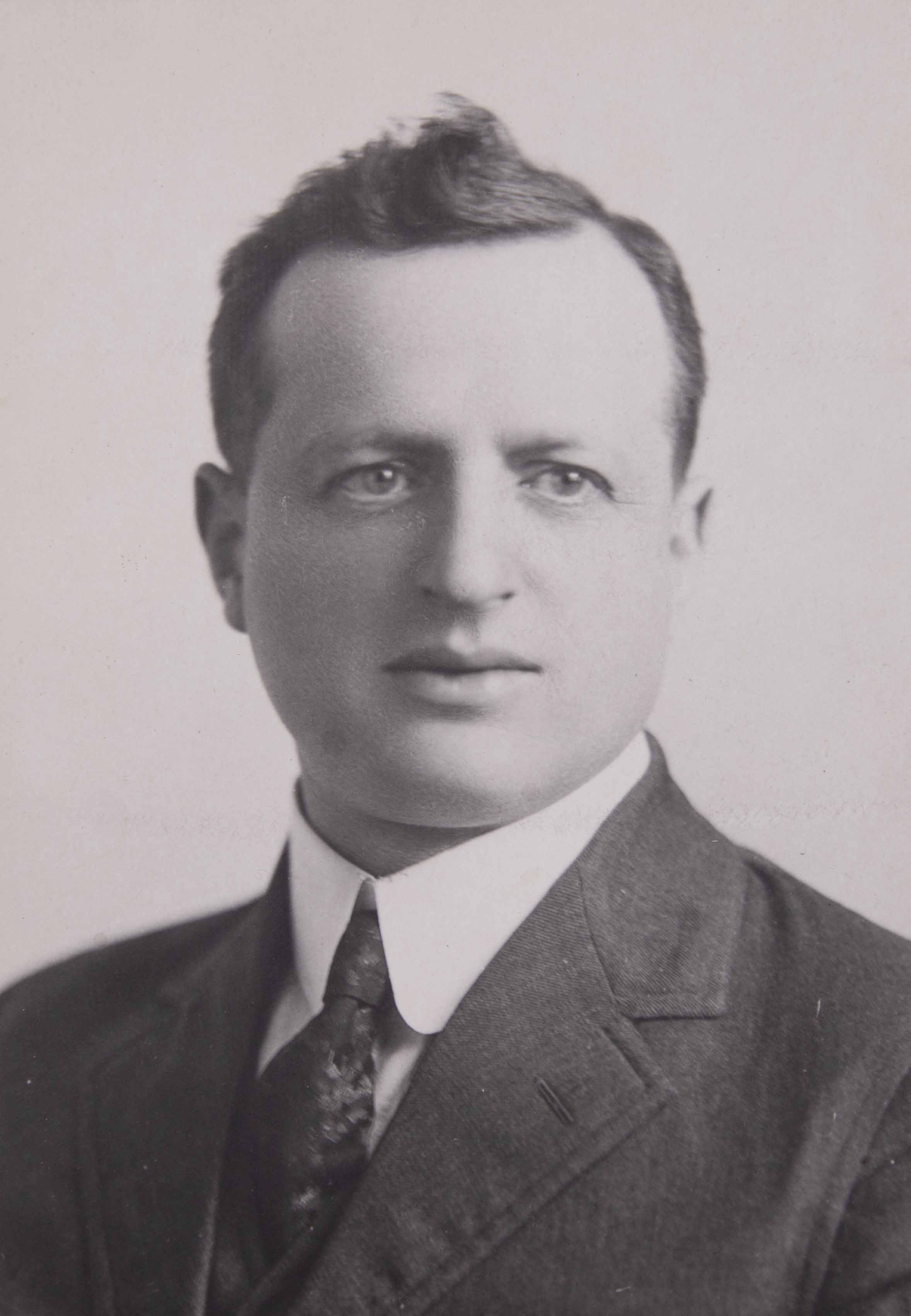
- Heaps in 1921

Member of the Canadian Parliament for Winnipeg North
- In office 1925–1940
- Preceded by: Edward James McMurray
- Succeeded by: Charles Stephen Booth

Member of the Winnipeg City Council
- In office 1917–1925

Personal details
- Born: Abraham Albert Heaps; 24 December 1885 Leeds, England
- Died: 4 April 1954 (aged 68) Bournemouth, England
- Party: Co-operative Commonwealth Federation

Abraham Albert Heaps (1885–1954), known as A. A. Heaps, was a Canadian politician and labour leader. A strong labourite, he served as MP for Winnipeg North from 1925 to 1940.

Born on 24 December 1885 in Leeds, England, Heaps emigrated to Canada in 1911 and worked in Winnipeg as an upholsterer. He was one of the leaders of the Winnipeg general strike of 1919 and was a Labour alderman on the Winnipeg City Council from 1917 to 1925.

He ran for the House of Commons of Canada as a Labour candidate in 1923 in the riding of Winnipeg North but was defeated.

He was elected in the 1925 election and joined J. S. Woodsworth as the only Labour MPs in Parliament. The Liberal government of William Lyon Mackenzie King was elected with a minority government. Heaps and Woodsworth agreed to support the Liberals in exchange for the government creating Canada's first old age pension. Heaps and Woodsworth joined other left-wing MPs to form the Ginger Group.

He was a founding member of the Co-operative Commonwealth Federation in 1932, and was a charter member of the CCF's caucus.

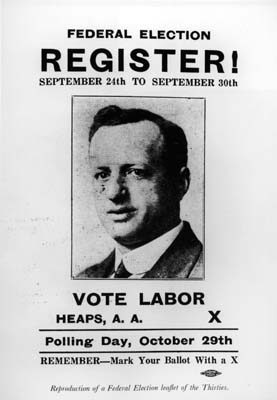
1930 election leaflet

One of the few Jews in Parliament, Heaps pushed the government to allow Jewish refugees from the Nazis into Canada, but with little success.

He was defeated in the 1940 election by Charles Stephen Booth from the Liberal Party due to a strong candidacy in Winnipeg North by the Communist Party's candidate.

Heaps died in Bournemouth, England, on 4 April 1954 while visiting family and was buried in his birthplace of Leeds.

His son, Leo Heaps, wrote a 1984 biography about him called The Rebel in the House: The Life and Times of A.A. Heaps MP and was an unsuccessful New Democratic Party candidate in the 1979 federal election for the riding of Eglinton—Lawrence. His grandson, Adrian Heaps, was elected to Toronto City Council in 2006.

== Electoral record ==
1940 Canadian federal election
Party	Candidate	Votes	%	±%
Liberal	Charles Stephen Booth	13,015	40.9	+11.6
Co-operative Commonwealth	Abraham Albert Heaps	11,249	35.3	-6.8
Communist	Leslie Tom Morris	5,315	16.7	-8.7
National Government	Percy Ellor	2,255	7.1	
Total valid votes		31,834	100.0	

1935 Canadian federal election
Party	Candidate	Votes	%	±%
Co-operative Commonwealth	Abraham Albert Heaps	12,093	42.2	-6.9
Liberal	C.S. Booth	8,412	29.3	+14.0
Communist	Tim Buck	7,276	25.4	
Social Credit	Fred John Welwood	905	3.2	
Total valid votes		28,686	100.0	

1930 Canadian federal election
Party	Candidate	Votes	%	±%
Labour	Abraham Albert Heaps	6,907	49.0	-0.1
Conservative	Matthew Robert Blake	5,011	35.6	+7.3
Liberal	Leslie Morris	2,164	15.4	-7.1
Total valid votes		14,082	100.0	

1926 Canadian federal election
Party	Candidate	Votes	%	±%
Labour	Abraham Albert Heaps	6,171	49.2	+10.1
Conservative	Richard R. Knox	3,555	28.3	-3.4
Liberal	George Boyd McTavish	2,821	22.5	-6.7
Total valid votes		12,547	100.0	

1925 Canadian federal election
Party	Candidate	Votes	%	±%
Labour	Abraham Albert Heaps	4,781	39.1	+6.5
Conservative	Matthew Robert Blake	3,882	31.7	
Liberal	Edward James McMurray	3,573	29.2	-35.5
Total valid votes		12,236	100.0	

Canadian federal by-election, 24 October 1923
Party	Candidate	Votes	%	±%
Due to McMurray's appointment to an "office of emolument"
Liberal	Edward James McMurray	5,628	64.7	+35.3
Labour	Abraham Albert Heaps	2,835	32.6	+27.2
Unknown	Paul Gigejczuc	199	2.3	
Unknown	Joseph Martin	39	0.4	
Total valid votes		8,701	100.0	
