= Donald Malinowski (politician) =

Canadian politician

Donald Marto Malinowski CM (March 14, 1924 in Lwow, Poland – May 16, 2003) was a priest of the Polish National Catholic Church and politician in Manitoba, Canada. He served as a New Democratic member of the Legislative Assembly of Manitoba from 1969 to 1986.

The son of Stanley Malinowski and Marlyn Gajewska, he was educated in Poland, Scranton, Pennsylvania, and St. John's College. During World War II, Malinowski fought against the Nazis in the Armia Krajowa, who supported Poland's government-in-exile in London. He was wounded on three occasions, and was sentenced to death for refusing to sign an oath of allegiance to the communist government that came to power at the war's end. He escaped from his prison to Sweden, where he remained for three years, gaining an appreciation for its principles of social democracy. He came to Canada in 1950.

In 1952, Malinowski entered a Polish National Catholic Church seminary in Scranton, Pennsylvania. He was later ordained as a priest, and married a nurse named Anna Glazer (the PNCC is a separate denomination from the Roman Catholic church, and does not require priestly celibacy). The couple worked in New York State before moving to Winnipeg, Manitoba in 1959.

Malinowski served as a chaplain at the Royal Canadian Legion, and was named the parish priest at St. Mary's National Catholic Church in north-end Winnipeg. By 1972, he had been given authority over all churches in western Canada. In addition to his religious work, he was involved in developing a number of housing projects in north-end Winnipeg.

He first ran for the legislature in the provincial election of 1966, but finished a distant third in the riding of Winnipeg Centre. In the 1969 election, he won an easy victory in the north-end Winnipeg riding of Point Douglas, and became a backbench supporter of the NDP government of Edward Schreyer.

In the provincial election of 1973, Malinowski faced an unusual challenge from independent candidate Joseph Borowski, who had served in Schreyer's cabinet before leaving the NDP in 1972. Borowski ran as a social conservative, criticizing the NDP government's toleration of abortion services and suggesting that Malinowski was guilty of hypocrisy in this regard. Notwithstanding these attacks, Malinowski scored a fairly easily victory, defeating Borowski by over 2,500 votes. He was re-elected again by a greater margin in the 1977 election.

Malinowski supported Howard Pawley's successful bid to become the NDP's interim leader in early 1979, following Schreyer's resignation. In the provincial election of 1981, he was re-elected in the redistributed riding of St. Johns. He retired from the legislature in 1986. Despite his long tenure, he was never appointed to cabinet (he once joked, "cabinet ministers come and go, but I am always a minister").

A social democrat by conviction, Malinowski was an opponent of communism for his entire life. During the 1980s, Malinowski provided aid to Lech Wałęsa's Solidarity movement in Poland via the Polish Relief Program, and also provided financial support to Polish refugees living in Austria. In 1988, he was made a Member of the Order of Canada for being "instrumental in organizing the Polish Relief Fund during the early 1980s".

He died of cancer in Calgary in 2003. The Manitoba legislature held a moment of silence in his honour in 2003.

== Electoral record ==
1981 Manitoba general election: St. Johns
Party	Candidate	Votes	%
New Democratic	Donald Malinowski	4,004	56.99
Progressive Conservative	Don Cilinsky	1,785	25.41
Liberal	Henry Kowlowski	674	9.59
Progressive	Bernie Bellan	446	6.35
Communist	William Cecil Ross	117	1.67
Total valid votes		7,026	
Rejected ballots		70	
Turnout		7,096	67.18
Electors on the lists		10,562	
