= St. Johns (electoral district) =

Provincial electoral district in Manitoba, Canada

Coordinates: 49.932°N 97.124°W

Manitoba electoral district
- Location in Winnipeg

Provincial electoral district
- Legislature: Legislative Assembly of Manitoba
MLA
Nahanni Fontaine
New Democratic
- District created: 1957
- First contested: 1958
- Last contested: 2019

St. Johns is a provincial electoral district of Manitoba, Canada. It was created by redistribution in 1957, and has formally existed since 1958. It is located in the north-end of Winnipeg. The constituency is bordered by Kildonan to the north and west, Burrows to the west, Elmwood to the east, and Point Douglas to the south.

The riding's population in 1996 was 20,023. The average family income in 1999 was $40,443, with an unemployment rate of 10.90%. Over 35% of the riding's residents are categorized as low-income.

St. Johns has a diverse population. Ten per cent of the riding's residents listed Ukrainian as their ethnic origin in 1999, with a further 6% Polish and 5% Jewish. Twelve per cent of the riding's residents are aboriginal. Manufacturing jobs accounted for 18% of the riding's industry, with a further 15% in services.

Since its creation, St. Johns has been represented by members of the Manitoba Co-operative Commonwealth Federation (CCF) and its successor, the New Democratic Party (NDP). It is considered safe for the party. The current MLA is Nahanni Fontaine, who was elected in the Manitoba general election, 2016.

== Members of the Legislative Assembly ==
This riding has elected the following MLAs:

Parliament	Years	Member	Party
Riding created from Winnipeg North
22nd	1958–1959	David Orlikow	CCF
23rd	1959–1961	David Orlikow	CCF
23rd	1961–1962	David Orlikow	New Democratic Party
24th	1962–1966	Saul Cherniack	New Democratic Party
25th	1966–1969	Saul Cherniack	New Democratic Party
26th	1969–1973	Saul Cherniack	New Democratic Party
27th	1973–1977	Saul Cherniack	New Democratic Party
28th	1977–1981	Saul Cherniack	New Democratic Party
29th	1981–1986	Don Malinowski	New Democratic Party
30th	1986–1988	Judy Wasylycia-Leis	New Democratic Party
31st	1988–1990	Judy Wasylycia-Leis	New Democratic Party
32nd	1990–1993	Judy Wasylycia-Leis	New Democratic Party
32nd	1993–1995	Gord Mackintosh	New Democratic Party
33rd	1995–1999	Gord Mackintosh	New Democratic Party
34th	1999–2003	Gord Mackintosh	New Democratic Party
35th	2003–2007	Gord Mackintosh	New Democratic Party
36th	2007–2011	Gord Mackintosh	New Democratic Party
37th	2011–2016	Gord Mackintosh	New Democratic Party
38th	2016–2019	Nahanni Fontaine	New Democratic Party
39th	2019–present	Nahanni Fontaine	New Democratic Party

== Electoral history ==
1981 Manitoba general election
Party	Candidate	Votes	%
New Democratic	Donald Malinowski	4,004	56.99
Progressive Conservative	Don Cilinsky	1,785	25.41
Liberal	Henry Kowlowski	674	9.59
Progressive	Bernie Bellan	446	6.35
Communist	William Cecil Ross	117	1.67
Total valid votes		7,026	
Rejected ballots		70	
Turnout		7,096	67.18
Electors on the lists		10,562	

Manitoba provincial by-election, September 21, 1993 Resignation of Judy Wasylycia-Leis
Party	Candidate	Votes	%
New Democratic	Gord Mackintosh	3,232	67.11
Liberal	Naty Yankech	878	18.23
Progressive Conservative	June Robertson	465	9.66
Progressive	Neil Schipper	241	5.00
Total valid votes		4,816	100
Rejected and declined ballots		34	
Turnout		4,850	44.48
Electors on the lists		10,903	

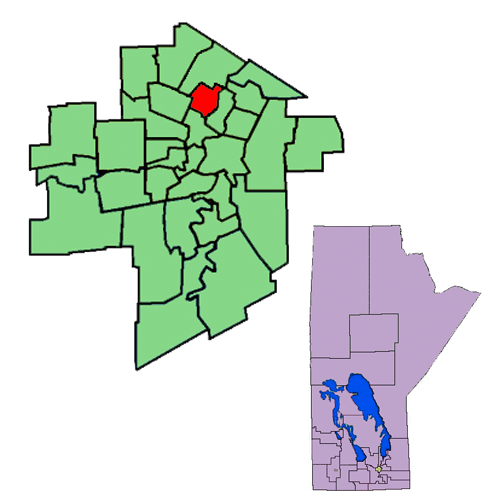
The 1999-2011 boundaries for St. Johns highlighted in red

1999 Manitoba general election
Party	Candidate	Votes	%	±%	Expenditures
New Democratic	Gord Mackintosh	5,776	71.57		$22,442.00
Progressive Conservative	Ray Larkin	1,635	20.3		$14,847.38
Liberal	Patrick Fontaine	607	7.53	–	$5,400.00
Total valid votes		8,008	100.00		
Rejected and declined votes		43			
Turnout		8,056	65.1		
Registered voters		12,374			

2003 Manitoba general election
Party	Candidate	Votes	%	±%	Expenditures
New Democratic	Gord Mackintosh	4,224	72.40	+0.83	$13,571.43
Liberal	Ed Kolodziej	745	12.77	+5.24	$4041.92
Progressive Conservative	E. Ray Garnett	612	10.49	−9.81	$967.69
Green	Alon Weinberg	221	3.79	+3.79	$532.73
Libertarian	Chris Buors	32	0.55	+0.55	$0.00
Total valid votes		5,834	100.00		
Rejected and declined votes		43			
Turnout		5,877	47.72		
Registered voters		12,315			

2007 Manitoba general election
Party	Candidate	Votes	%	±%	Expenditures
New Democratic	Gord Mackintosh	4,223	68.59	−3.81	$22,084.23
Progressive Conservative	Tim Hooper	1,018	16.53	+6.04	$7,896.80
Liberal	Selina Sapong-Beiber	604	9.81	−2.96	$4,981.08
Green	Dawn Carey	291	4.72	−0.93	$39.55
Total valid votes		6,136	99.67		
Rejected and declined votes		21			
Turnout		6,157	51.44	+3.72	
Registered voters		11,969			

2011 Manitoba general election
Party	Candidate	Votes	%	±%	Expenditures
New Democratic	Gord Mackintosh	4,157	65.55	−3.04	$21,376.44
Progressive Conservative	Ray Larkin	1,405	22.15	+5.62	$6,754.40
Green	Alon David Weinberg	392	6.18	+1.46	$454.35
Liberal	Trevor Mueller	348	5.49	−4.32	$3,058.48
Total valid votes		6,302			
Rejected and declined votes		40			
Turnout		6,342	48.34		
Registered voters		13,119			
Source: Elections Manitoba

2016 Manitoba general election
Party	Candidate	Votes	%	±%	Expenditures
New Democratic	Nahanni Fontaine	2,358	37.05	-28.05	$28,122.25
Progressive Conservative	Barbara Judt	1,869	29.37	+7.22	$9,267.93
Liberal	Noel Bernier	1,465	23.02	+17.53	$19,281.67
Green	Elizabeth Puchailo	671	10.54	+4.36	$0.00
Total valid votes/expense limit		6,363	100.0		$40,783.00
Declined and rejected ballots		93	–	–	
Turnout		6,456	51.43	–	
Eligible voters		12,554			
Source: Elections Manitoba

2019 Manitoba general election
Party	Candidate	Votes	%	±%	Expenditures
New Democratic	Nahanni Fontaine	3,526	51.2	+14.15	$10,974.72
Progressive Conservative	Ray Larkin	1,665	24.2	-5.17	$521.28
Liberal	Eddie Calisto-Tavares	1,092	15.9	-7.12	$518.13
Green	Joshua McNeil	601	8.7	-1.84	$0.00
Total valid votes			100.0		
Total rejected ballots					
Turnout					
Eligible voters					

2023 Manitoba general election
Party	Candidate	Votes	%	±%	Expenditures
New Democratic	Nahanni Fontaine	4,262	60.76	+8.88	$19,847.75
Independent	Patrick Allard	1,117	15.92	–	$17,543.47
Progressive Conservative	Teddy Rubenstein	1,101	15.69	-8.78	$0.00
Liberal	Dennis Yaeger	535	7.63	-8.62	$0.00
Total valid votes/expense limit		7,015	99.53	–	$58,447.00
Total rejected, unmarked and declined ballots		33	0.47	–	
Turnout		7,048	46.98	-0.36	
Eligible voters		15,003			
New Democratic hold		Swing		-3.52	
Source(s) Source: Elections Manitoba

== See also ==
- List of Manitoba provincial electoral districts
- Canadian provincial electoral districts
