= Joseph Zuken =

Canadian communist politician (1912–1986)

Winnipeg City Councillor for Ward 3
- In office 1962–1983

Winnipeg School Board Trustee for Ward 3
- In office 1942–1962

Personal details
- Born: 12 December 1912 Ukraine
- Died: 25 March 1986 (aged 73) Winnipeg, Manitoba, Canada
- Party: Communist Party of Canada
- Relations: William Ross
- Education: University of Manitoba
- Profession: Lawyer, Politician

Joseph Zuken (December 12, 1912 – March 24, 1986) was a popular communist politician in Winnipeg and the longest serving elected Communist party politician in North America. He served on the Winnipeg city council from 1961 to 1983.

Joe Zuken's family immigrated to Canada from Ukraine when he was still an infant. Raised in a secular Jewish environment in Winnipeg's working class North End he was educated at a secular Yiddish school in a socialist environment. He joined the Communist Party of Canada as a young lawyer and intervened in struggles for workers rights and in anti-fascist movements during the Great Depression.

Prior to the Second World War Zuken was connected with theatre in the city, both on-stage as an actor and off-stage, including an attempt to put on Eight Men Speak in a Winnipeg theatre.

As a lawyer he defended the party and left wing trade unions in court against state repression and later established a legal clinic to give poor people access to legal representation.

In 1941 Zuken was elected to Winnipeg's school board and was one of the few Communists to win re-election through the Cold War. He fought for the establishment of kindergartens, free textbooks, and higher salaries for teachers.

After serving on the school board for twenty years he was elected, in 1961, to Winnipeg's city council on behalf of the North End ward which had been represented since the 1930s by fellow Communist Jacob Penner. As an alderman he fought for public housing, public hospitals and rights for the poor.

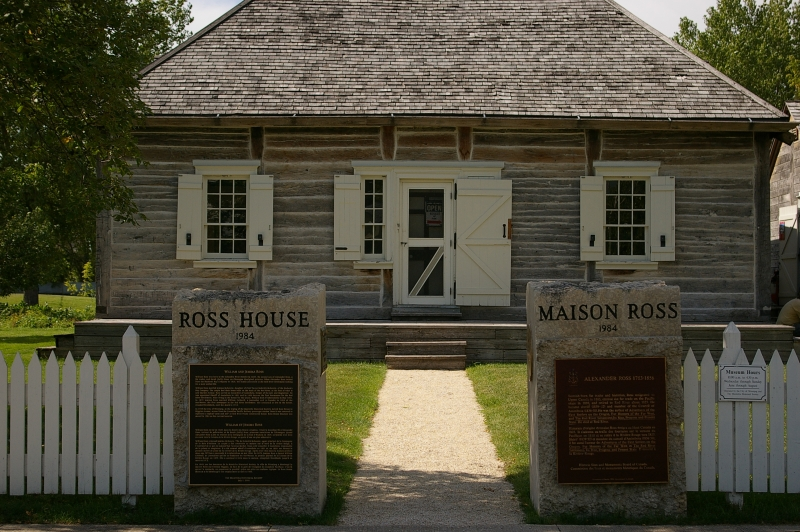
Ross House Museum in Joe Zuken Park, Winnipeg

Although Zuken's membership in the Communist Party was controversial, he was respected by politicians across the political spectrum for both his intelligence and his political commitment. In early 1969, he won the unanimous support of his colleagues on city council for changes to Winnipeg's Tenant Act. The reforms included the establishment of a landlord/tenant review board, restrictions on eviction notices, and improvements to the privacy rights of tenants.

In 1979 Zuken unsuccessfully ran for Mayor of Winnipeg and won 18% of the vote.

He remained an alderman until his retirement in 1983 due to poor health.

Though a loyal member of the Communist Party he expressed public criticisms of the Soviet Union in the 1970s for its restrictions on Jewish emigration and official antisemitism in Poland in the late 1960s.

Zuken's older brother, William Ross (Cecil Zuken), was also an active Communist politician, and served as leader of the Communist Party in Manitoba from 1948 to 1981.
