= Murray Smith (Canadian politician) =

Canadian politician

William Murray Smith

Member of Parliament for Winnipeg North
- In office March 1958 – June 1962

Personal details
- Born: 23 October 1930 Cardale, Manitoba, Canada
- Died: 1 October 2010 (aged 79) Calgary, Alberta, Canada
- Party: Progressive Conservative
- Profession: barrister

William Murray Smith (23 October 1930 – 1 October 2010) was a Progressive Conservative party member of the House of Commons of Canada. He was born at Cardale, Manitoba and became a barrister by career.

After an unsuccessful attempt in the 1957 election, Smith was elected at the Winnipeg North riding in the 1958 general election and served one term, the 24th Canadian Parliament, before his defeat at Winnipeg North in the 1962 election. He was also unsuccessful in his campaign at Winnipeg North Centre in the 1974 election.

During the 1990s, Murray Smith became a key player in Royal Club International and then Chateau World where he was named as the President of that corporation.

Smith died at the Agape Hospice in Calgary from cancer, aged 79.
