= Libertarian Party of Manitoba candidates in the 2003 Manitoba provincial election =

Listing of candidates

The Libertarian Party of Manitoba fielded five candidates in the 2003 provincial election, none of whom were elected. Information about these candidates may be found on this page. The party received a total of 248 votes.

== Gavin Whittaker (Elmwood) ==
Whittaker received 67 votes (1.1%), finishing fourth against New Democratic Party incumbent Jim Maloway.

== Jim Weidman (Fort Rouge) ==
Weidman is a perennial candidate for the Libertarian Party, having campaigned under its banner three times at the provincial level. He was also a candidate of the Libertarian Party of Canada in the 1988 federal election. Weidman was 43 years old during the 1990 election, and listed himself as the executive director of a private Jewish men's club. He supports traditional libertarian principles, including smaller government.

Electoral record
| Election | Division | Party | Votes | % | Place | Winner |
|---|---|---|---|---|---|---|
| 1988 provincial | River Heights | Libertarian | 62 | 0.6 | 4/4 | Sharon Carstairs, Liberal |
| 1988 federal | Winnipeg South | Libertarian | 168 | 0.3 | 5/5 | Dorothy Dobbie, Progressive Conservative |
| 1990 provincial | Osborne | Libertarian | 139 | 1.4 | 4/4 | Reg Alcock, Liberal |
| 2003 provincial | Fort Rouge | Libertarian | 51 | 0.7 | 5/5 | Tim Sale, New Democratic Party |

== Andy Caisse (Lord Roberts) ==
Caisse received 66 votes (0.9%), finishing fifth against New Democratic Party incumbent Diane McGifford.

== Clancy Smith (River Heights) ==
Smith received 32 votes (0.3%), finishing fifth against Liberal Party leader Jon Gerrard.

== Chris Buors (St. Johns) ==
Buors, who was chosen as party leader two days into the election, received 32 votes (0.6%) for a fifth-place finish against New Democratic Party incumbent Gord Mackintosh.
