= George W. Allen =

George W. Allen may refer to:

- George W. Allen (judge) (1844–1928), associate justice and chief justice of the Colorado Supreme Court
- George Wigram Allen (1824–1885), Australian politician
- George Warner Allen (1916–1988), British artist

== See also ==
- George W. G. Allen (1891–1940), pioneered aerial photography for archaeological research
- W. George Allen (1936–2019), first African-American to graduate from the University of Florida School of Law
- George William Allan (1822–1901), Canadian politician
- George William Allan (Manitoba politician) (1860–1940), Canadian politician
