= John Angus (politician) =

Canadian politician (1943–2026)

John Campbell Angus (March 3, 1943 – October 13, 2026) was a Canadian businessman and politician in Manitoba. He was a city councillor in Winnipeg from 1977 to 1988, and a member of the Legislative Assembly of Manitoba from 1988 to 1990. Angus returned to the Winnipeg City Council in 1992, and continued to serve on that body until 2004.

== Life and career ==
John Campbell Angus was born on March 3, 1943, and was educated at the University of Winnipeg and the Manitoba Institute of Technology. He served as an executive member of the Winnipeg Business Development Corporation, and was for a time the vice president of Comcheq, a national Canadian company providing computerized payroll services. Angus owned an international software company and a real estate firm, and held a broker's license.

He was elected to the Winnipeg council for St. Norbert ward (at the city's southern tip) in 1977, and reached the office of deputy mayor in 1986. During his early years on the city council, he was associated with the now-defunct Independent Citizens' Election Committee, a right-wing organization which generally represented the interests of the city's developers and suburban residents. In the provincial election of 1988, he was elected to the provincial legislature for St. Norbert as a Liberal, defeating incumbent Progressive Conservative Gerry Mercier by 388 votes.

The Liberals increased their parliamentary representation from one to twenty in this election, and Angus sat as a member of the official opposition for the next two years. During his time in parliament, he argued that the Public Utilities Board of Manitoba should be granted greater review powers over Manitoba Hydro.

In the provincial election of 1990, he lost to Tory candidate Marcel Laurendeau by 117 votes, amid a general decline in support of the Liberal Party.

Angus was re-elected to the city council in 1992. He supported the gradual elimination of the city's business tax, and the immediate elimination of city taxes on arts and amusement. He entered the race for Mayor of Winnipeg in 1998, but withdrew before election day. Reg Alcock, then the federal MP for Winnipeg South, endorsed Angus in 2002.

On January 12, 2004, Angus resigned from the city's Executive Policy Committee, one of the most important bodies in the city's governing structure.

In 2008 Winnipeg named a major street in the Waverley West neighbourhood in his honour.

Angus died on October 13, 2026, at the age of 83.

== Election results ==
1988 Manitoba general election: St. Norbert
Party	Candidate	Votes	%	±%
Liberal	John Angus	6,073	45.91	+
Progressive Conservative	Gerry Mercier	5,695	43.05	-
New Democratic	Bennetta Benson	1,460	11.04	-
Total valid votes		13,228	100.00	-
Rejected ballots		36	–	–
Turnout		13,264	76.95	
Eligible voters		17,237		
Source: Elections Manitoba
