= Waverley (electoral district) =

Provincial electoral district in Manitoba, Canada

Manitoba electoral district
- Location in Winnipeg

Provincial electoral district
- Legislature: Legislative Assembly of Manitoba
MLA
David Pankratz
New Democratic
- District created: 2018
- First contested: 2019
- Last contested: 2023

Demographics
- Population (2016): 20,820
- Census division: Division No. 11
- Census subdivision: Winnipeg

Waverley is a provincial electoral district of Manitoba, Canada, that came into effect at the 2019 Manitoba general election. It elects one member to the Legislative Assembly of Manitoba.

Created by the decennial provincial electoral redistribution of 2018, from parts of St. Norbert and Fort Whyte, the riding contains the southwest Winnipeg neighbourhoods of Waverley West, Waverley Heights, and part of Montcalm. It is bordered by the ridings of Fort Whyte to the north, Fort Garry to the northeast, Fort Richmond to the east, Seine River to the south, and Midland to the west. All adjacent ridings except for Midland are also in Winnipeg.

== Members of the Legislative Assembly ==
Assembly	Years	Member	Party
42nd	2019–2023	Jon Reyes	Progressive Conservative
43rd	2023–present	David Pankratz	New Democratic

== Election results ==
2023 Manitoba general election
Party	Candidate	Votes	%	±%	Expenditures
New Democratic	David Pankratz	4,063	44.10	+15.50	$23,387.66
Progressive Conservative	Jon Reyes	3,948	42.85	-7.19	$52,161.10
Liberal	Uche Nwankwo	1,001	10.87	-5.53	$25,709.48
Green	Manjit Kaur	201	2.18	-2.78	$4,926.00
Total valid votes/expense limit		9,213	99.76	–	$66,689.00
Total rejected and declined ballots		22	0.24	–	
Turnout		9,235	53.97	+2.02	
Eligible voters		17,111			
New Democratic gain from Progressive Conservative		Swing		+11.35	
Source(s) Source: Elections Manitoba

2019 Manitoba general election
Party	Candidate	Votes	%	±%	Expenditures
Progressive Conservative	Jon Reyes	3,267	50.05	-4.9	$17,708.08
New Democratic	Dashi Zargani	1,867	28.60	+1.2	$8,866.80
Liberal	Fiona Haftani	1,070	16.39	+2.7	$5,425.87
Green	James Ducas	324	4.96	+2.5	$0.00
Total valid votes		6,528	99.47		
Total rejected ballots		35	0.53		
Turnout		6,563	51.95		
Eligible voters		12,634			
Progressive Conservative hold		Swing		-3.0	

2016 provincial election redistributed results
Party	%
Progressive Conservative	54.9
New Democratic	27.4
Liberal	13.7
Green	2.5
Others	1.4

== See also ==
- List of Manitoba provincial electoral districts
- Canadian provincial electoral districts
