= Owen Trainor =

Canadian politician

Member of Parliament for Winnipeg South
- In office August 1953 – November 1956
- Preceded by: Leslie Alexander Mutch
- Succeeded by: Gordon Chown

Personal details
- Born: Owen C. Trainor; 16 October 1894 Moncton, New Brunswick, Canada
- Died: 28 November 1956 (aged 62) Ottawa, Ontario, Canada
- Party: Progressive Conservative
- Spouse: Mabel Edna Creban (m. 1926)
- Profession: physician

Owen C. Trainor (16 October 1894 – 28 November 1956) was a Progressive Conservative member of the House of Commons of Canada.

He was born in Moncton, New Brunswick, and studied medicine at Saint Dunstan's College in Charlottetown, then at McGill University in Montreal. From there, Trainor became a physician in Winnipeg.

He was elected to represent the Winnipeg South riding in the 1953 general election, which had become open following the retirement of MP Leslie Mutch. Trainor served as an opposition member of Parliament. He died of a heart attack at his House of Commons office before the end of the 22nd Canadian Parliament.
