= Libertarian Party of Manitoba candidates in the 1988 Manitoba provincial election =

Listing of candidates

The Libertarian Party of Manitoba fielded six candidates in the 1988 provincial election, none of whom were elected.

== Candidates ==
- Elmwood: Russ Letkeman
- Fort Rouge: Dennis Owens
- Osborne: Clancy Smith
- River Heights: Jim Weidman
- St. James: Dennis Rice
- St. Vital: Trevor Wiebe
