= Gordon Giesbrecht =

Canadian physiologist

Gordon Grant Giesbrecht is a Canadian physiologist who operates the Laboratory for Exercise and Environmental Medicine at the University of Manitoba in Manitoba, Canada. He studies the effects of extreme environments, including cold, heat, hypoxia, and hypobaria on the human body. His laboratory motto is vitas salvantas (saving lives). He was dubbed "Professor Popsicle" in a feature article in Outside Magazine.

Dr. Giesbrecht ran unsuccessfully as the Conservative Party of Canada's candidate for Winnipeg South in the 2015 Canadian federal election.

== Academic career ==
Giesbrecht is a Canadian academic and public educator. Giesbrecht earned a PhD in physiology from the University of Manitoba in 1990 and has been a professor of thermophysiology in the Faculty of Kinesiology and Recreation Management since 1991. He is best known for his work on cold physiology and the co-creation of Cold Water Boot Camp and Beyond Cold Water Boot Camp; two public/professional educational programs. He has also spearheaded a research and education program dedicated to reduce the incidence of vehicle submersion drownings, which account for up to 10% of all drownings.

=== Cold physiology and survival ===
Through publications, media appearances and educational programs, Giesbrecht has championed the fact that most cold-water immersion deaths are not caused by hypothermia (which takes more than an hour for most adults), but rather occur earlier due to either the cold shock response (gasping and hyperventilation), or cold incapacitation (due to cooling of muscle and nerve fibres). In order to clarify and publicize the four phases of cold water immersion

1. Cold shock response
2. Cold incapacitation
3. Hypothermia
4. Circum-rescue collapse

Giesbrecht coined the 1-10-1 Principle which was introduced on February 19, 2004 on Late Night With David Letterman. "If you fall in ice water, do not panic and remember you have 1 MINUTE to get control of your breathing, 10 MINUTES of meaningful movement, and 1 HOUR before you become unconscious due to hypothermia."

=== Vehicle submersion ===
After testifying as an expert witness in an inquest regarding the death of the driver of a snowplow that broke through the ice on a winter road, Giesbrecht realized that up to 10% of all drownings occurred in vehicles and that there was virtually no organized research into vehicle submersion, especially with people in the test vehicles. Operation ALIVE (Automobile submersion: Lessons In Vehicle Escape) has resulted in a series of scientific publications and the following public advice for occupants of a sinking car: "Don't panic, do not touch your cell phone and remember 4 words, 'SEATBELTS off; WINDOWS open; CHILDREN released from their constraints; and OUT'". This work has also resulted in rewriting of the "Sinking Vehicle Protocol", and creation of a new "Vehicle Stranded in Floodwater Protocol" used by the National Academies of Emergency Dispatch for 9-1-1 emergency dispatch operators throughout the world.

=== Media communications ===
Giesbrecht has appeared in a number of interviews and documentaries relating to his work in environmental medicine, including Discovery Channel Canada, twice on the Rick Mercer Report, the National Geographic Channel, Canadian and US network news, and The Nature of Things.

=== Publications ===
Giesbrecht is the author/coauthor of over 90 publications in the scientific literature, has coauthored one book, Hypothermia, Frostbite and Other Cold Injuries, and written a dozen book chapters.

=== Awards and honours ===
- 2015 Elected as a Fellow of the Aerospace Medical Association
- 2012 Blair Erb World Congress Award for worldwide impact on wilderness medicine, from the Wilderness Medical Society.
- 2012 The Ellingson Award for Scientific Writing Achievement within the Associate Fellows Group of the Aerospace Medical Association.
- 2011 Education and Training Award of the National Search and Rescue Program Awards of Excellence (Canada)
- 2010 Elected as an Associate Fellow of the Aerospace Medical Association
- 2008 Canadian Safe Boating Association, Special Recognition Award
- 2005 Elected to the Explorer's Club

== Political career ==
After incumbent Conservative MP Rod Bruinooge declined to run in the 2015 Canadian federal election, Giesbrecht won the nomination race to replace him as candidate for Winnipeg South. During the campaign Giesbrecht highlighted Canada’s number one ranking in the G7 in both economic growth and job creation. He also described the 24% increase in combined science funding for four federal funding organizations (NSERC, SSHRC, CIHR and NRC) during the Conservative mandate.

In September 2015, Giesbrecht faced criticism from his political opponents for a 2009 video in which he described abortion rates as "a 9/11 every day for the past 35 years." The video was made when Giesbrecht was president of Horizon College and Seminary, a Saskatoon Christian Bible College. These comments came from a message in which Giesbrecht encouraged future community and church leaders to meet people in their greatest times of need (in this case, women with unwanted pregnancies or who had an abortion) not with condemnation but with Christian love, compassion and support.

=== Election results ===
2015 Canadian federal election: Winnipeg South
Party	Candidate	Votes	%	±%	Expenditures
Liberal	Terry Duguid	28,096	58.29	+26.30	$131,358.55
Conservative	Gordon Giesbrecht	16,709	34.67	-17.07	$130,109.13
New Democratic	Brianne Goertzen	2,404	4.99	-9.15	$2,235.01
Green	Adam Smith	990	2.05	-0.08	$837.96
Total valid votes/expense limit		48,199	100.00		$198,589.24
Total rejected ballots		203	0.42	–	
Turnout		48,402	75.87	–	
Eligible voters		63,798			
Liberal gain from Conservative		Swing		+21.68	
Source: Elections Canada
