= Dave Gaudreau =

Canadian politician

Dave Gaudreau MLA

Member of the Legislative Assembly of Manitoba for St. Norbert
- In office October 4, 2011 – April 19, 2016
- Preceded by: Marilyn Brick
- Succeeded by: Jon Reyes

Personal details
- Party: New Democrat

Dave Gaudreau, MLA is a former Canadian politician, who served in the Legislative Assembly of Manitoba from 2011 to 2016. He represented the electoral district of St. Norbert as a member of the Manitoba New Democratic Party caucus.

== Electoral results ==
=== Provincial ===
2016 Manitoba general election: St. Norbert
Party	Candidate	Votes	%	±%	Expenditures
Progressive Conservative	Jon Reyes	4,673	51.02	6.22	$36,660.34
New Democratic	Dave Gaudreau	3,062	33.43	-11.72	$24,532.06
Liberal	James Bloomfield	1,251	13.66	3.60	$38,985.78
Independent	Narinder Kaur Johar	174	1.90	–	$5,367.70
Total valid votes / expense limit		9,160	–	–	$44,386.00
Rejected		134	–		
Eligible voters / turnout		14,278	65.09	0.85	
Source(s) Source: Manitoba. Chief Electoral Officer (2016). Statement of Votes for the 41st Provincial General Election, April 19, 2016 (PDF) (Report). Winnipeg: Elections Manitoba. "Election Returns: 41st General Election". Elections Manitoba. 2016.

2011 Manitoba general election: St. Norbert
Party	Candidate	Votes	%	±%	Expenditures
New Democratic	Dave Gaudreau	3,966	45.15	-8.59	$25,959.60
Progressive Conservative	Karen Velthuys	3,935	44.80	12.85	$32,439.47
Liberal	Marcel Laurendeau	883	10.05	-4.26	$31,742.60
Total valid votes		8,784	–	–	
Rejected		41	–		
Eligible voters / turnout		13,736	64.25	-1.22	
Source(s) Source: Manitoba. Chief Electoral Officer (2011). Statement of Votes for the 40th Provincial General Election, October 4, 2011 (PDF) (Report). Winnipeg: Elections Manitoba. "Election Returns: 40th General Election". Elections Manitoba. 2011.

=== Federal ===
2011 Canadian federal election: Winnipeg South
Party	Candidate	Votes	%	±%	Expenditures
Conservative	Rod Bruinooge	22,840	52.24	+3.41	$74,282.37
Liberal	Terry Duguid	14,296	32.70	-2.10	$65,648.93
New Democratic	Dave Gaudreau	5,693	13.02	+1.59	$8,116.60
Green	Caitlin McIntyre	889	2.03	-2.47	$564.35
Total valid votes/expense limit		43,718	100.00		–
Total rejected ballots		187	0.43	-0.01	
Turnout		43,905	69.80	+4.17	
Eligible voters		62,902	–	–	
