= Ian Turnbull (politician) =

Canadian politician (1935–2025)

Ian Denys Turnbull

Member of the Manitoba Legislative Assembly for Osborne
- In office 1969–1977
- Preceded by: Obie Baizley
- Succeeded by: Gerald Mercier

Personal details
- Born: July 1, 1935 Winnipeg, Manitoba, Canada
- Died: November 21, 2025 (aged 90)
- Party: New Democratic

Ian Denys Turnbull (July 1, 1935 – November 21, 2025) was a politician in Manitoba, Canada. He was a New Democratic member of the Legislative Assembly of Manitoba from 1969 to 1977, and a member of Edward Schreyer's cabinet from 1973 to 1977.

The son of Matthew Turnbull, he received his B.A. and M.A from the University of Manitoba. In 1961, Turnbull married Aleda Winnifred Woodworth. In his career, he did research at the University of Manitoba, taught high school, and with his wife developed a consulting partnership with contracts mostly in Asia in addition to his involvement in politics. He was first elected to the Manitoba legislature in the provincial election of 1969, defeating Progressive Conservative incumbent Obie Baizley who was then Minister of Labour by 623 votes in the central Winnipeg riding of Osborne. He was appointed to the Board of the Manitoba Telephone System in 1970 and as the Legislative Assistant to the Minister of business development. He was a strong advocate of increasing the responsibilities of legislative committees and served on many of them being Chair of the Economic Development Committee and the Public Utilities Committee.

He was re-elected in the 1973 election, defeating Liberal June Westbury by 1598 votes. He was named Minister of Consumer, Corporate and Internal Services with responsibility for the Manitoba Telephone System and the Public Utilities Commission. He was also appointed Chair of the Management Committee of Cabinet. Following a cabinet shuffle on September 22, 1976, he was promoted to Minister of Education.

In the 1977 election, he lost to Tory candidate Gerald Mercier by 96 votes. After politics, he taught for a number of years and then went with his wife to Asia, where she managed a CIDA project and he worked as a consultant in Pakistan. After several years overseas, they moved to Victoria, British Columbia.
