= Bud Sherman =

Canadian politician (1926–2015)

- Official 1966 portrait

Member of the Legislative Assembly of Manitoba for Fort Garry
- In office 1969–1984
- Preceded by: Sterling Lyon
- Succeeded by: Charlie Birt

Member of the Canadian Parliament for Winnipeg South
- In office November 8, 1965 – June 25, 1968
- Preceded by: Margaret Konantz
- Succeeded by: James Armstrong Richardson

Personal details
- Born: Louis Ralph Sherman; December 24, 1926 Quebec City, Quebec, Canada
- Died: January 9, 2015 (aged 88) Winnipeg, Manitoba, Canada
- Party: Progressive Conservative Party of Manitoba
- Spouse: Elizabeth Ann Beaton (m. 1955)
- Education: University of Manitoba
- Profession: broadcaster, journalist, newspaper editor

Louis Ralph "Bud" Sherman (December 24, 1926 – January 9, 2015) was a politician in Manitoba, Canada. He served in the House of Commons of Canada during the 1960s and was a Progressive Conservative member of the Legislative Assembly of Manitoba from 1969 to 1984, serving as a cabinet minister in the government of Sterling Lyon.

== Early life and education ==
The son of Louis Ralph Sherman, archbishop of Rupert's Land, and Caroline Zerelda Gillmor, Sherman was born in Quebec City, Quebec. He was educated at the University of Manitoba. He served with the Canadian Officers' Training Corps in 1947–49, graduating as a first lieutenant. Subsequently, he worked as a broadcaster, journalist, and newspaper editor. In 1955, Sherman married Elizabeth Ann Beaton.

== Career ==
In the 1965 Canadian federal election, Sherman was elected to the House of Commons for the riding of Winnipeg South as a Progressive Conservative, defeating Liberal incumbent Margaret Konantz by about 3,000 votes (Sidney Green of the New Democratic Party came a strong third). Sherman served as an opposition MP for the two and a half years of the 27th Canadian Parliament, under leaders John Diefenbaker, Michael Starr and Robert Stanfield, before losing his seat to high-profile Liberal candidate James Richardson by over 8,000 votes in the 1968 federal election. Following his defeat, he wrote a regular column in the Winnipeg Tribune.

He was first elected to the Manitoba Legislature in the provincial election of 1969, defeating his NDP opponent by more than 1,500 votes in the riding of Fort Garry, which was then just south of Winnipeg. The NDP formed a minority government after the election, and Sherman again sat as an opposition member. In 1973, he was narrowly re-elected over Liberal candidate Henry Janzen.

Sherman was re-elected by a much greater margin in the 1977 election, in which the Progressive Conservatives won a majority government under Sterling Lyon (who, coincidentally, had represented Fort Garry before Sherman). On October 24, 1977, Sherman was appointed Minister of Health and Social Development, with responsibility for corrections and rehabilitation. In October 1978, the name of his portfolio was changed to Health and Community Services. On November 15, 1979, Sherman's title was again changed to "Minister of Health", and he retained the position for the remainder of the Lyon government's time in office. Sherman also served as chairman of the Community Services Committee of cabinet from October 20, 1978 to the resignation of the Lyon government on November 30, 1981.

The NDP under Howard Pawley formed a majority in the provincial election of 1981, although Sherman was easily re-elected in his own riding. He served as deputy leader of the provincial Conservatives until he resigned his seat to run for the Canadian House of Commons again in the 1984 federal election. Earlier in 1984, federal Progressive Conservative leader Brian Mulroney warned Sherman and other Tories that they must support French language rights of minorities outside Quebec to run as PC candidates. Sherman had previously questioned French-language rights in Manitoba. In the 1984 federal election, he lost to Liberal incumbent Lloyd Axworthy in the riding of Winnipeg—Fort Garry by just over 2,000 votes. At the time of the election, Sherman listed his profession as "health-care consultant".

Sherman did not seek a return to politics since this time. He later served as vice chairman of the Canadian Radio-Television and Telecommunications Commission (CRTC), and was partly responsible for developing CRTC policy concerning changes in Canadian telecommunications with the growth of the Internet and broadband services. He retired from the position in 1995.

== Later life and death ==
Sherman supported Conservative candidate Raj Joshi in the riding of Winnipeg South Centre in the 2004 federal election.

In December 2004, he was elected to the board of directors of the Manitoba Major Soccer League. He died at the age of 88 on January 9, 2015, in Winnipeg.
