= Norma McCormick =

Canadian politician

Member of the Legislative Assembly of Manitoba for Osborne
- In office September 21, 1993 – April 25, 1995
- Preceded by: Reg Alcock
- Succeeded by: Diane McGifford

Personal details
- Born: Norma Kester; July 5, 1944 (age 80); Dauphin, Manitoba, Canada
- Political party: Liberal Party of Manitoba

Norma McCormick (born July 5, 1944 in Dauphin, Manitoba) is a Canadian politician. She was a member of the Legislative Assembly of Manitoba from 1993 to 1995, and a member of the Liberal Party of Manitoba.

She was born Norma Kester, the daughter of Norman McDonald Kester and Margaret Evelyn Strang. Before entering public life, McCormick was a health-care business owner. She is the founder, and from 1987 to 1993, the president of Corporate Health Works, Inc.

== Political career ==
She first ran for the Manitoba legislature in the provincial election of 1977, finishing third in the central-Winnipeg riding of Wolseley. She did not run for office again until 1993, when she was elected for the nearby riding of Osborne, replacing Reg Alcock, who had resigned to run in that year's federal election. McCormick defeated her nearest opponent, New Democrat Irene Haigh, by over 500 votes. Her time in the legislature was brief. In the 1995 provincial election, she lost to NDP candidate Diane McGifford by almost 1,000 votes. She has not sought a return to office since that time.

=== Electoral record ===
1977 Manitoba general election: Wolseley
Party	Candidate	Votes	%	±%
Progressive Conservative	Robert Wilson	2,763	41.01	+18.63
New Democratic	Murdoch MacKay	2,689	39.90	+1.12
Liberal	Norma McCormick	1,286	19.09	-19.74
Turnout		6,873	74.98	
Progressive Conservative gain from Liberal		Swing		+19.18
Source: Elections Manitoba

Manitoba provincial by-election, 1993: Osborne (electoral district)
Party	Candidate	Votes	%	±%
Liberal	Norma McCormick	2,966	43.10	+2.89
New Democratic	Irene Haigh	2,420	35.16	+5.97
Progressive Conservative	Roger Young	1,496	21.74	-7.43
Turnout				
Liberal hold		Swing		-1.54
Source: Elections Manitoba

1995 Manitoba general election: Osborne
Party	Candidate	Votes	%	±%
New Democratic	Diane McGifford	3,969	40.86	+5.7
Liberal	Norma McCormick	2,978	30.66	-12.44
Progressive Conservative	Shelley Mitchell	2,766	28.48	+6.74
Turnout		7,226	67.72	
Eligible voters		10,670		
New Democratic gain from Liberal		Swing		+9.07
Source: Elections Manitoba

After her defeat, McCormick returned to the leadership of Corporate Health Works, Inc. She has also taught courses in occupational safety at the University of Manitoba.

She has served as the chair of the Standards Council of Canada's Consumer and Public Interest Committee. In 2009, she was named chairperson of the International Organization for Standardization's Committee on Consumer Policy for 2010–2011.
