= Gerry Mercier =

Canadian politician

Member of the Manitoba Legislative Assembly for Osborne
- In office 1981–1988
- Succeeded by: Muriel Smith

Personal details
- Born: November 7, 1942 (age 83) Claresholm, Alberta, Canada
- Party: Progressive Conservative Party of Manitoba
- Education: University of Manitoba
- Profession: lawyer

Gerald Wayne Joseph Mercier (born November 7, 1942) is a politician in Manitoba, Canada. He was a member of the Legislative Assembly of Manitoba from 1977 to 1988, and was a cabinet minister in the Progressive Conservative government of Sterling Lyon.

The son of Gerard Mercier, he was born in Claresholm, Alberta, in 1942. Mercier was educated at St. Paul's College and the University of Manitoba Law School, and practiced as a lawyer before entering political life. He served on the Winnipeg City Council from 1971 to 1977, when he shifted to the provincial scene. On one occasion, he served as Chair of the city's Works and Operation Committee. In 1966, he married Merryl-Lee Wood.

In the 1977 provincial election, Mercier was elected in the central Winnipeg riding of Osborne over incumbent New Democrat Ian Turnbull by 96 votes. The Progressive Conservatives won a majority government in this election, and on October 24, 1977, Mercier was appointed Attorney General, Minister of Municipal Affairs and Minister of Urban Affairs. The latter two positions were merged as one ministry on October 20, 1978, and were separated again on November 15, 1979, when Mercier was named Urban Affairs minister and Government House Leader. He also had responsibility for the Liquor Control Act between October 20, 1978, and 1981. Notwithstanding the changes in name, Mercier had essentially the same responsibilities through the entirety of the Lyon government.

Lyon's government was defeated in the 1981 election, although Mercier successfully sought re-election in the safe Tory seat of St. Norbert rather than in the marginal Osborne riding. He was re-elected in the 1986 election. Mercier held a unique position in caucus for the next few years, being one of the few individuals who was on friendly terms with supporters of party leader Gary Filmon and potential challengers Clayton Manness and Don Orchard.

Mercier lost a narrow contest against Liberal candidate John Angus in the 1988 election, in which the Progressive Conservatives formed a minority government under Gary Filmon.

He has not sought a return to provincial politics since his defeat. He was named to the Family Division of the Court of Queen's Bench of Manitoba in 1989. From 1993 to 2009, Mercier served as Associate Chief Justice in the Family Division. In 2009, he elected to become a supernumerary judge.
