= Margaret Konantz =

Canadian politician

Margaret Konantz OBE

Member of Parliament for Winnipeg South
- In office 8 April 1963 – 7 November 1965
- Preceded by: Gordon Chown
- Succeeded by: Bud Sherman

Personal details
- Born: Margaret McTavish Rogers; 30 April 1899 Winnipeg, Manitoba, Canada
- Died: 11 May 1967 (aged 68) Fredericton, New Brunswick, Canada
- Party: Liberal
- Spouse: Gordon Konantz (m. 1922; died 1954)
- Children: 3
- Relatives: Edith Rogers (mother)
- Profession: Humanitarian

Margaret McTavish Konantz OBE (née Rogers; 30 April 1899 – 11 May 1967) was a Canadian politician of Métis ancestry, who represented the electoral district of Winnipeg South in the House of Commons of Canada from 1963 to 1965. She was the first woman from Manitoba elected to the House of Commons.

Konantz was the daughter of Edith Rogers, the first woman ever elected to the Legislative Assembly of Manitoba, and Robert Arthur Rogers, a businessman. In 1922, Margaret married Gordon Konantz, the president of the North American Lumber Company, with whom she had three children: Barbara, Gordon, and William.

Konantz was a founding member of the Junior League of Winnipeg and became a major fundraiser - specifically with organizing the JL Thrift Shop. She served as the President of the Junior League of Winnipeg from 1928 to 1930.

During World War II, Margaret Konantz was an active volunteer for the Patriotic Salvage Corps, Bundles for Britain and the Women's Volunteer Services. In 1944, she was one of four women sent to Great Britain by the Canadian government to work with the Women's Voluntary Service. She was appointed an Officer of the Order of the British Empire for her volunteer work in the war effort. Following the death of her husband in 1954, she volunteered for UNICEF, travelling to Japan, Taiwan, Hong Kong, the Philippines, Thailand, Cambodia, India, Pakistan, Iraq, Lebanon, Jordan, Israel, Ghana, Nigeria, South Africa, Rhodesia, Tanzania, Kenya, Uganda, Ethiopia and the United Arab Republic on behalf of the organization.

She originally stood as the Liberal candidate for Winnipeg South in the 1962 election, but lost to Progressive Conservative incumbent Gordon Chown. When John Diefenbaker's minority government fell the following year, however, Konantz defeated Chown in the 1963 election. As the Liberals replaced the Tories as the governing party, she also served as a backbench supporter of the new Prime Minister Lester B. Pearson's government in the 26th Canadian Parliament. In 1964, she was the only woman on a committee of 15 MPs selected by Prime Minister Pearson to choose a new flag for Canada. She served as an MP until the 1965 election, when she was defeated by new Progressive Conservative candidate Bud Sherman.

Also in 1963, she was a delegate to the United Nations Third Committee on Social, Economic and Humanitarian Problems. In this capacity, she toured several Indian reserves in Canada to study economic and health conditions.

She became national chair for UNICEF Canada in 1965, and undertook several further international tours with the organization after leaving elected politics. She died on May 11, 1967, after collapsing of a heart attack at a radio station while preparing to conduct an interview about her UNICEF work.
