= Jon Reyes =

Canadian politician (born 1971 or 1972)

Minister of Labour and Immigration
- In office January 30, 2023 – October 18, 2023
- Premier: Heather Stefanson
- Preceded by: Portfolio re-established
- Succeeded by: Malaya Marcelino

Minister of Advanced Education, Skills and Immigration
- In office January 18, 2022 – January 30, 2023
- Premier: Heather Stefanson
- Preceded by: Wayne Ewasko
- Succeeded by: Sarah Guillemard

Minister of Economic Development and Jobs
- In office July 15, 2021 – January 18, 2022
- Premier: Brian Pallister; Kelvin Goertzen; Heather Stefanson
- Preceded by: Ralph Eichler
- Succeeded by: Cliff Cullen

Member of the Legislative Assembly of Manitoba for Waverley
- In office September 10, 2019 – September 5, 2023
- Preceded by: first member
- Succeeded by: David Pankratz

Member of the Legislative Assembly of Manitoba for St. Norbert
- In office April 19, 2016 – August 12, 2019
- Preceded by: Dave Gaudreau
- Succeeded by: Riding dissolved

Personal details
- Born: 1971 or 1972 (age 54–55) Winnipeg, Manitoba, Canada
- Party: Progressive Conservative
- Spouse: Cynthia
- Children: 2
- Education: Royal Roads University (BCom)

Military service
- Branch/service: Royal Canadian Navy

Jon Reyes (born 1971 or 1972) is a Canadian politician and former member of the Legislative Assembly of Manitoba.

He mostly recently served as Minister of Labour and Immigration from January to October, 2023, and was previously the Minister of Advanced Education, Skills and Immigration, Minister of Economic Development and Jobs. From 2016 to 2021, Reyes also served as Special Envoy for Military Affairs for Manitoba.

A member of the Progressive Conservative Party of Manitoba, he was first elected in the 2016 provincial election as MLA for St. Norbert, and was re-elected in 2019 as MLA for Waverley. Running for re-election for Waverely in 2023, Reyes was unseated by NDP candidate David Pankratz.

Reyes is the first Canadian-born person of Filipino descent to serve in the Manitoba legislature.

== Early life and career ==
Jon Reyes was born and raised in Winnipeg, Manitoba, around 1972.

Reyes served 10 years in the Canadian Forces in both the Communication Reserves and the regular force with the Royal Canadian Navy (RCN), including 5 years stationed on HMCS Winnipeg. As a reservist, he was awarded the Special Service Medal (NATO) while serving at CFB Lahr in Germany. Reyes served with the RCN until 2000 as a Naval Combat Information Operator and then as an instructor at Canadian Forces Fleet School Pacific, located at CFB Esquimalt on Vancouver Island.

Reyes received a Bachelor of Commerce in Entrepreneurial Management at Royal Roads University. After a brief career as a civil servant in the federal government, Reyes opened two small businesses with his wife Cynthia, which they owned and operated for 16 years.

In 2010, Reyes founded the Manitoba Filipino Business Council (MFBC) and served as the organization's first president until 2015. During his tenure as President of MFBC, he helped develop stronger trade ties between Canada and the Philippines. He has also served as a former member of the Manitoba Football Officials Association and as a support crew member for the Canadian Football League.

Reyes was a director of the Kidney Foundation of Canada - Manitoba Branch from 2013 until 2016, where he initiated the Filipino Kidney Health Initiative. He was also named to the Royal Canadian Mounted Police (RCMP) Commanding Officer's Cultural Diversity Advisory Committee in 2015.

== Political career ==
In the 2016 election, Reyes defeated incumbent NDP MLA Dave Gaudreau for the St. Norbert constituency, and was subsequently appointed the Special Envoy for Military Affairs (SEMA) by Premier Brian Pallister.

On May 10, 2017, Reyes was named to the Fiscal Responsibility Committee of Cabinet, a committee tasked to examine priority matters of the Government of Manitoba related to fiscal and budgetary responsibility, which included strategic transformation priorities, providing oversight for key transformation projects identified in the Fiscal Performance Review and assuming responsibility for other strategic initiatives as directed by Treasury Board or Cabinet.

Reyes was appointed President of the Manitoba Branch of the Assemblée parlementaire de la Francophonie (APF) in March 2018 and met with provincial and territorial representatives to address the state of Francophone affairs in Manitoba, at the 34th Session of the APF Regional Assembly in Quebec City on July 10, 2018.

He has also represented the Province of Manitoba at the inaugural Seamless Canada Meeting at the Canadian Forces Staff College in Toronto held on June 27, 2018, and the second Seamless Canada Meeting in Ottawa on December 5, 2018, where he met with other provincial/territorial representatives to share a compilation of initiatives and services already in place for Manitoba's military community.

On, December 6, 2018, Reyes was named to the Economic Growth Committee of Cabinet, a committee which oversees a whole-of-government approach to growing the provincial economy.

The St. Norbert constituency was abolished leading up to the 2019 provincial election, and Reyes sought election in the newly formed constituency of Waverley. He won with approximately 50% of the vote.

In the 2023 provincial election, Reyes again sought re-election in his constituency of Waverley. Reyes faced NDP candidate David Pankratz, a former paramedic and firefighter, who ran his campaign primarily on healthcare, a key issue in the election campaign. During the campaign, Reyes received the endorsement of former NDP candidate and prior opponent Dashi Zargani. Pankratz ultimately narrowly defeated Reyes by 119 votes.

== Personal life ==
Reyes is married and has two children.

He has been a member of the Knights of Columbus since 2013.

On January 8, 2022, Reyes was heavily criticized and made international headlines for posting a photo of his wife on Twitter shoveling their driveway after she finished a 12-hour shift as a nurse working during the COVID-19 pandemic. His wife later defended him.

== Electoral record ==
2023 Manitoba general election: Waverley
Party	Candidate	Votes	%	±%	Expenditures
New Democratic	David Pankratz	4,063	44.10	+15.50	$23,387.66
Progressive Conservative	Jon Reyes	3,948	42.85	-7.19	$52,161.10
Liberal	Uche Nwankwo	1,001	10.87	-5.53	$25,709.48
Green	Manjit Kaur	201	2.18	-2.78	$4,926.00
Total valid votes/expense limit		9,213	99.76	–	$66,689.00
Total rejected and declined ballots		22	0.24	–	
Turnout		9,235	53.97	+2.02	
Eligible voters		17,111			
New Democratic gain from Progressive Conservative		Swing		+11.35	
Source(s) Source: Elections Manitoba

2019 Manitoba general election: Waverley
Party	Candidate	Votes	%	±%	Expenditures
Progressive Conservative	Jon Reyes	3,267	50.05	-4.9	$17,708.08
New Democratic	Dashi Zargani	1,867	28.60	+1.2	$8,866.80
Liberal	Fiona Haftani	1,070	16.39	+2.7	$5,425.87
Green	James Ducas	324	4.96	+2.5	$0.00
Total valid votes		6,528	99.47		
Total rejected ballots		35	0.53		
Turnout		6,563	51.95		
Eligible voters		12,634			
Progressive Conservative hold		Swing		-3.0	

2016 Manitoba general election: St. Norbert
Party	Candidate	Votes	%	±%	Expenditures
Progressive Conservative	Jon Reyes	4,673	51.02	6.22	$36,660.34
New Democratic	Dave Gaudreau	3,062	33.43	-11.72	$24,532.06
Liberal	James Bloomfield	1,251	13.66	3.60	$38,985.78
Independent	Narinder Kaur Johar	174	1.90	–	$5,367.70
Total valid votes / expense limit		9,160	–	–	$44,386.00
Rejected		134	–		
Eligible voters / turnout		14,278	65.09	0.85	
Source(s) Source: Manitoba. Chief Electoral Officer (2016). Statement of Votes for the 41st Provincial General Election, April 19, 2016 (PDF) (Report). Winnipeg: Elections Manitoba. "Election Returns: 41st General Election". Elections Manitoba. 2016.
