= Marcel Laurendeau =

Canadian politician

Marcel Laurendeau is a politician in Manitoba, Canada. He was a member of the Manitoba legislature from 1990 to 2003, representing the Progressive Conservative Party of Manitoba in the south-end Winnipeg riding of St. Norbert.

== Political career ==
Laurendeau began his political career at the municipal level, having been elected to the Winnipeg City Council in 1988 (replacing John Angus, who had been elected to the provincial legislature). He was himself elected to the provincial legislature in the provincial election of 1990, defeating Liberal Angus by 117 votes. For the next five years, Laurendeau was a backbench supporter of Premier Gary Filmon.

He was briefly kidnapped in his car in 1992, and subsequently called for greater security on the legislative grounds. In 1993, he supported Jean Charest's bid for the leadership of the Progressive Conservative Party of Canada.

Laurendeau was re-elected in the provincial election of 1995, defeating Liberal challenger Val Thompson by 527 votes. He was named Deputy Speaker on May 23, 1995, and held this position for the entirety of the parliament which followed.

The Progressive Conservatives were defeated in the provincial election of 1999, although Laurendeau himself was re-elected with an increased majority. The social-democratic New Democratic Party overtook the Liberals for second place in this cycle, as Marilyn Brick came within 670 votes of defeating Laurendeau. Laurendeau served as opposition House Leader in the following parliament.

The NDP's strong showing in 1999 was regarded as surprising in some circles, as the party has not traditionally had a strong electoral base in south Winnipeg. The NDP targeted St. Norbert in the 2003 election, with the result that Brick beat Laurendeau in a rematch, 3355 votes to 2610. After his defeat, he joined the Arbitration and Mediation Institute of Manitoba.

Laurendeau supported Stockwell Day for the leadership of the Canadian Alliance party in 2000. He ran unsuccessfully for the St. Norbert seat on Winnipeg City council in 2005.

In 2010, he left the Conservatives claiming that the party had become too right wing. He switched to the Liberal Party and ran as that party's candidate in the 2011 provincial election for his old riding of St. Norbert. Laurendeau finished third with 883 votes behind Dave Gaudreau of the NDP and Karen Velthuys of the Progressive Conservatives.
