= Obie Baizley =

Canadian politician

Personal details
- Born: May 25, 1917 Montreal, Quebec Canada
- Died: May 3, 2000 (aged 82) Winnipeg, Manitoba Canada
- Party: Progressive Conservative

William Obadiah Baizley (May 25, 1917 – May 3, 2000) was a politician in Manitoba, Canada. He was a Progressive Conservative member of the Legislative Assembly of Manitoba from 1959 to 1969, and served as a cabinet minister in the governments of Dufferin Roblin and Walter Weir.

Born in Montreal, Quebec, the son of William Daniel Baizley and Esther May Tanner, Baizley was educated at Glenlawn Collegiate in St. Vital, Manitoba and the Lincoln Chiropractic College in Indiana. He returned to Manitoba in 1937 and worked as a chiropractor, also serving as president of the Manitoba Chiropractors' Association before entering political life. During World War II, he was a member of the Royal Canadian Air Force. In 1939, he married Jessie Anne MacDonald.

He was first elected to the Manitoba legislature in the 1959 provincial election, unexpectedly defeating CCF leader Lloyd Stinson by 326 votes in the south-central Winnipeg riding of Osborne. He served as a backbench supporter of Roblin's government for the next four years.

Re-elected without difficulty in the 1962 provincial election, Baizley was appointed to cabinet on February 27, 1963 as Minister of Labour. He held this position until September 24, 1968, when he was named Minister of Municipal Affairs. He endorsed Walter Weir to succeed Roblin as Progressive Conservative leader in 1967.

Baizley was re-elected easily in the 1966 election, but lost to Ian Turnbull of the Manitoba New Democratic Party by 623 votes in 1969. He did not seek a return to office after this time.

During the 1970s, Baizley was chair of the Manitoba Labour Board. He also served as president of Riverview United Church.

He died at the Meadowood Manor Personal Care Home in Winnipeg at the age of 82.
