= David Pankratz =

Canadian politician

David Pankratz MLA

Minister responsible for First Responder Initiatives
- Incumbent
- Assumed office September 28, 2026
- Preceded by: Position established

Member of the Legislative Assembly of Manitoba for Waverley
- Incumbent
- Assumed office October 3, 2023
- Preceded by: Jon Reyes

Personal details
- Born: November 11, 1982 (age 44) Winnipeg, Manitoba, Canada
- Party: New Democratic
- Children: 3

David Pankratz is a Canadian politician, who was elected to the Legislative Assembly of Manitoba in the 2023 Manitoba general election. He is The Military Envoy and represents the district of Waverley as a member of the Manitoba New Democratic Party.

Prior to his election, Pankratz was a firefighter, and is a former paramedic. He also played drums in the indie rock band, Quinzy from Winnipeg.

== Electoral history ==
2023 Manitoba general election: Waverley
Party	Candidate	Votes	%	±%	Expenditures
New Democratic	David Pankratz	4,063	44.10	+15.50	$23,387.66
Progressive Conservative	Jon Reyes	3,948	42.85	-7.19	$52,161.10
Liberal	Uche Nwankwo	1,001	10.87	-5.53	$25,709.48
Green	Manjit Kaur	201	2.18	-2.78	$4,926.00
Total valid votes/expense limit		9,213	99.76	–	$66,689.00
Total rejected and declined ballots		22	0.24	–	
Turnout		9,235	53.97	+2.02	
Eligible voters		17,111			
New Democratic gain from Progressive Conservative		Swing		+11.35	
Source(s) Source: Elections Manitoba
