= Gordon Chown =

Canadian politician (1922–2002)

Gordon Campbell Chown

Alderman, City of Winnipeg
- In office 1952–1955

Member of Parliament for Winnipeg South
- In office 10 June 1957 – 8 April 1963
- Preceded by: Owen Trainor
- Succeeded by: Margaret Konantz

Personal details
- Born: 15 August 1922 Winnipeg, Manitoba, Canada
- Died: 31 July 2002 (aged 79) Brantford, Ontario, Canada
- Party: Progressive Conservative
- Spouse: Catherine Oliver Barton (m. 1959)
- Profession: Barrister, lawyer

Gordon Campbell Chown (15 August 1922 – 31 July 2002) was a Progressive Conservative member of the House of Commons of Canada. He was born in Winnipeg, Manitoba, the son of physician (Stanley) Gordon Chown and his wife Penelope Millen, and became a lawyer.

He served overseas in the army during the Second World War and attained the rank of captain. He served as president of the Young Conservatives of Manitoba (1951) and as an alderman of Winnipeg (1952 to 1955).

He was elected to represent the Winnipeg South riding in the upset 1957 general election, then re-elected in the landslide 1958 election and in the minority 1962 election. He lost his seat to Liberal challenger Margaret Konantz in the 1963 election, which also saw a Liberal minority government replace the Conservative one. Chown served in the 23rd to 25th Canadian Parliaments. During his last term in the House of Commons, he served as Deputy Speaker and chairman of the Committee of the Whole.

After leaving federal politics, Chown moved to Toronto. He helped to found the York County Legal Aid Plan. In 1972 he was appointed as an Ontario provincial judge, acting in this capacity in Toronto and Hamilton until his retirement in 1992.

On 29 December 1959, he married Catherine Oliver Barton, and adopted her three children. He was a lifelong member of the Anglican Church of Canada, as well as a life member of the Royal Canadian Military Institute, Toronto, and of the University of Manitoba Alumni Association. As a past member of the Royal Lake of the Woods Yacht Club and Winnipeg Winter Club, he was an avid sailor and figure skater.

He died in Brantford, Ontario on 31 July 2002, fifteen days before his eightieth birthday.
