= Marilyn Brick =

Canadian politician

Member of the Legislative Assembly of Manitoba for St. Norbert
- In office June 3, 2003 – October 4, 2011
- Preceded by: Marcel Laurendeau
- Succeeded by: Dave Gaudreau

Personal details
- Education: University of Manitoba (BPE)

Marilyn Brick is a former politician in Manitoba, Canada. She served in the Manitoba legislature from 2003 to 2011, representing St. Norbert.

== Biography ==
Brick was educated at the University of Manitoba, graduating from the university's Bachelor of Physical Education program and receiving a Continuing Education Division Certificate in Human Resource Management. She has been involved in a number of community programs, serving as President of the Richmond Kings Community Centre and as a member of the Manitoba Parks and Recreation Association Board of Governors. Brick has also founded a day care advocacy group, received a Citation Award for volunteer service to the Red Cross, and served on the Canadian Union of Public Employees Local 500.

Prior to her election, Brick worked in the Community Services Department of the City of Winnipeg. She had previously held several other positions in the city, working in the field of Recreation Services and Marketing.

In the 1999 Manitoba general election, Brick ran as a New Democrat in the south-end Winnipeg riding of St. Norbert. She lost to Progressive Conservative incumbent Marcel Laurendeau, 4,152 votes to 3,482.

In the 2003 election, the NDP made a number of historic breakthroughs in south Winnipeg. Brick defeated Laurendeau, 3,355 votes to 2,610, and became the first social democrat ever to represent the riding. She was re-elected in the 2007 provincial election.

In early 2011, Brick announced that she would not run for reelection in the election to be held later that year.
