= Quinzy (band) =

Quinzy are a Canadian indie rock band from Winnipeg, Manitoba. They have released one album and several EPs. Many of the band's songs are about Winnipeg. The band includes lead singer and guitarist Sandy Taronno, keyboardist and vocalist Jamie Taronno, bassist and vocalist Jason Pankratz, and drummer David Pankratz. Sandy and Jamie are brothers, as are Jason and David, and the Taronnos and Pankratzes are cousins.

The band originated in 2002, and were called The Good Fight, and then Sharp House Candy, before changing their name to Quinzy. Their 2006 album, Please Baby Please Baby Baby Baby Please, received a positive review in Exclaim!, noting "Riding right on the line between both American and British indie rock sounds, Quinzy find themselves with that distinctly Canadian approach to music that manages to incorporate the best of both worlds." Their 2008 EP, One Boy’s Guide To The Moon, was produced by Michael Phillip Wojewoda who is known for his work with Barenaked Ladies.

Each year from 2003 until 2012, the band had mounted a Christmas party called Quinzmas.

== Discography ==
=== Albums ===
- Please Baby Please Baby Baby Baby Please (2005)

=== EPs ===
- We Were Here
- One Boy’s Guide To The Moon (2008)
- Self Defense
- These Nautical Miles
- Feast!: Quinzmas Live at the WECC (2010)
- The Flats (2011)
