= The Stone (video game) =

1997 video game

- Developer: Abject Modernity Internet Creations Inc.
- Publisher: Abject Modernity Internet Creations Inc.
- Release: 1996

The Stone is an online game developed by web company Abject Modernity Internet Creations Inc. in 1995. The mystery game was created in 1996 but launched as a consumer product in 1997. People had to buy a physical stone containing the login credentials to the website, which was unheard of at the time. In 1999, The Stone was profiled by Forbes magazine.

"Stoners", a film about The Stone, was released by Rod Bruinooge and Scott Jaworski in September 2004. It covered the activities of the internet/online gaming community that emerged around The Stone. Pink Floyd provided the soundtrack to the film, with all music taken from The Division Bell Album.

== Gameplay ==
Puzzles of The Stone are located in a place called The Immediate. There are a total of 216 Stone puzzles, grouped into 6 categories, each category having 6 different levels of difficulty. Once all the puzzles are solved, The Stone is said to unlock an ancient mystery called the Enigma. The secret of The Stone is kept by the Stonekeepers.

A player of The Stone is often referred to as a stoner. When trying to solve a certain Stone puzzle, a stoner may go to a place called The Commons and ask for a nudge (i.e., a hint) from other stoners who have already solved that particular puzzle. Once a stoner has solved all available Stone puzzles, he or she is allowed into the Sisyphus Lodge.

== Championship tournament ==
The Stone Championship Tournament, also known as the Final Six Tournament, began September 30, 2005. The first Stone player to solve all of the six final puzzles would be crowned Champion of The Stone and would immediately be granted the status of Stonekeeper. The tournament was won August 11, 2007 by the Stone players "Gary_" and "cinnabar." The solution to the Enigma was discovered August 22, 2007 by Stone player "grissy".

Subsequent to the completion of the Final Six Tournament, the tournament puzzles were opened to all the remaining Stone players as the Final Six Redux, featuring slightly different answers for some of the puzzles. The Redux was won by the Stone players "BlindSide" and "morgana".

Following the Redux, a set of eight final puzzles (including the last ever Stone puzzle "Essence") was released as a mini-tournament known as "Outside the Immediate". This mini-tournament was won by the Stone players "Ultraspx", "morgana", "irisbb", "enobarbus" and "BlindSide".

== Shutdown ==
On April 3, 2008 at Midnight PST The Stone shut down for good. The puzzles from The Stone can be found at The Stone Monument (now hosted at Scarecrow's Field), although no user data was preserved so users must re-solve the puzzles of the Immediate. Stoners can still get nudges through the Scarecrow's Field forums.

== Legacy ==
Other internet/mystery games such as The Stone Unturned and Scarecrow's Field were inspired by The Stone.
