= St. Norbert (electoral district) =

Defunct provincial electoral district in Manitoba, Canada

Coordinates: 49.784°N 97.180°W

Manitoba electoral district
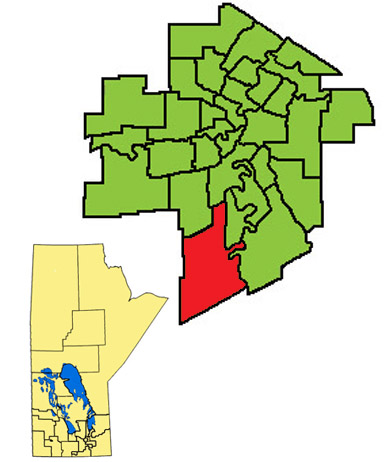

Defunct provincial electoral district
- Legislature: Legislative Assembly of Manitoba
- District created: 1979
- First contested: 1981
- Last contested: 2016

St. Norbert is a former provincial electoral district of Manitoba, Canada.

== Historical ridings ==
The original riding of St. Norbert was established at the time of the province's creation in 1870. For the 1870 provincial election, it was divided into two separate ridings: St. Norbert North and St. Norbert South. Subsequently, it was reduced to a single riding.

St. Norbert was a francophone-majority riding. It was eliminated in 1879, at a time when francophone representation in the province was being reduced.

=== St. Norbert North ===
Name	Party	Took office	Left office
Joseph Lemay	Government/French Party	1870	1874

=== St. Norbert South ===
Name	Party	Took office	Left office
Pierre Delorme	Government/French Party	1870	1874

=== St. Norbert ===
Name	Party	Took office	Left office
Joseph Dubuc	Government/French Party	1874	1878
Pierre Delorme	Government/French Party	1878	1879
Pierre Delorme	Opposition/French Party	1879	1879

== Most recent riding ==
It was recreated by redistribution in 1979, and was contested at the 1981 Manitoba general election. It was abolished at the redistribution of 2018 and ceased to exist under its old name effective at the 2019 Manitoba general election. The riding was located in the southernmost tip of the city of Winnipeg.

St. Norbert was bordered to the east by Seine River, to the south and west by the rural ridings of Dawson Trail and Morris (respectively), and to the north by Riel, Fort Garry (later Fort Richmond) and Fort Whyte. The riding's character is suburban.

St. Norbert's population in 1996 was 19,184. In 1999, the average family income was $59,444, and the unemployment rate was 8.20%. The riding is ethnically diverse: 5% of the riding's residents are German, 4% are Chinese, 3% are East Indian and 2% are Italian. Six per cent of the riding's residents are francophone. Almost 28% of the riding's residents have a university degree.

The service sector accounts for 16% of St. Norbert's industry, with a further 15% in the educational services.

Name	Party	Took office	Left office
Gerry Mercier	PC	1981	1988
John Angus	Lib	1988	1990
Marcel Laurendeau	PC	1990	2003
Marilyn Brick	NDP	2003	2011
Dave Gaudreau	NDP	2011	2016
Jon Reyes	PC	2016	2019

== Electoral results ==
=== 1870 ===
1870 Manitoba general election
Party	Candidate	Votes	%
Government	Joseph Lemay	35	79.55%
Undeclared	Joseph Genthan	9	20.45%
Total		44	–
Rejected		N/A	–
Eligible voters / Turnout		N/A	–
Source(s) Source: Manitoba. Chief Electoral Officer (1999). Statement of Votes for the 37th Provincial General Election, September 21, 1999 (PDF) (Report). Winnipeg: Elections Manitoba.

=== 1870 ===
1870 Manitoba general election
Party	Candidate	Votes	%
Government	Pierre Delorme	50	69.44%
Undeclared	Joseph Hamelin	22	30.56%
Total		72	–
Rejected		N/A	–
Eligible voters / Turnout		N/A	–
Source(s) Source: Manitoba. Chief Electoral Officer (1999). Statement of Votes for the 37th Provincial General Election, September 21, 1999 (PDF) (Report). Winnipeg: Elections Manitoba.

=== 1874 ===
1874 Manitoba general election
Party	Candidate	Votes	%
Government	Joseph Dubuc	51	62.20%
Undeclared	Pierre Delorme	31	37.80%
Total		82	–
Rejected		N/A	–
Eligible voters / Turnout		115	71.30%
Source(s) Source: Manitoba. Chief Electoral Officer (1999). Statement of Votes for the 37th Provincial General Election, September 21, 2000 (PDF) (Report). Winnipeg: Elections Manitoba.

=== 1878 ===
1878 Manitoba general election
Party	Candidate	Votes	%	±%
Government	Pierre Delorme	Acclaimed	–	–
Total			–	–
Rejected		N/A	–	
Eligible voters / Turnout		168	–	–
Source(s) Source: Manitoba. Chief Electoral Officer (1999). Statement of Votes for the 37th Provincial General Election, September 21, 2004 (PDF) (Report). Winnipeg: Elections Manitoba.

=== 1879 by-election ===
Manitoba provincial by-election, 1879
Party	Candidate	Votes	%	±%
Unknown	Pierre Delorme	Acclaimed	–	–
Total			–	–
Rejected		N/A	–	
Eligible voters / Turnout		N/A	–	–
Source(s) Source: Manitoba. Chief Electoral Officer (1999). Statement of Votes for the 37th Provincial General Election, September 21, 2005 (PDF) (Report). Winnipeg: Elections Manitoba.

=== 1981 ===
1981 Manitoba general election
Party	Candidate	Votes	%	±%
Progressive Conservative	Gerry Mercier	5,728	53.90%	–
New Democratic	Ruth Pear	3,826	36.00%	–
Liberal	Grant Temple	857	8.06%	–
Progressive	Allan Yap	216	2.03%	–
Total		10,627	–	–
Rejected		20	–	
Eligible voters / Turnout		14,409	73.75%	–
Source(s) Source: Manitoba. Chief Electoral Officer (1999). Statement of Votes for the 37th Provincial General Election, September 21, 2081 (PDF) (Report). Winnipeg: Elections Manitoba.

=== 1986 ===
1986 Manitoba general election
Party	Candidate	Votes	%	±%
Progressive Conservative	Gerry Mercier	5,788	50.72%	-3.18%
New Democratic	Ruth Pear	2,839	24.88%	-11.12%
Liberal	Mark O’Neill	2,784	24.40%	16.33%
Total		11,411	–	–
Rejected		15	–	
Eligible voters / Turnout		16,589	68.79%	-4.97%
Source(s) Source: Manitoba. Chief Electoral Officer (1999). Statement of Votes for the 37th Provincial General Election, September 21, 2084 (PDF) (Report). Winnipeg: Elections Manitoba.

=== 1988 ===
1988 Manitoba general election
Party	Candidate	Votes	%	±%
Liberal	John Angus	6,073	45.91%	21.51%
Progressive Conservative	Gerry Mercier	5,695	43.05%	-7.67%
New Democratic	Bennetta Benson	1,460	11.04%	-13.84%
Total		13,228	–	–
Rejected		36	–	
Eligible voters / Turnout		17,237	76.74%	7.96%
Source(s) Source: Manitoba. Chief Electoral Officer (1999). Statement of Votes for the 37th Provincial General Election, September 21, 2085 (PDF) (Report). Winnipeg: Elections Manitoba.

=== 1990 ===
1990 Manitoba general election
Party	Candidate	Votes	%	±%
Progressive Conservative	Marcel Laurendeau	4,502	45.48%	2.43%
Liberal	John Angus	4,385	44.30%	-1.61%
New Democratic	Andrew Sawatsky	1,011	10.21%	-0.82%
Total		9,898	–	–
Rejected		29	–	
Eligible voters / Turnout		13,501	73.31%	-3.43%
Source(s) Source: Manitoba. Chief Electoral Officer (1999). Statement of Votes for the 37th Provincial General Election, September 21, 2086 (PDF) (Report). Winnipeg: Elections Manitoba.

=== 1995 ===
1995 Manitoba general election
Party	Candidate	Votes	%	±%
Progressive Conservative	Marcel Laurendeau	4,699	43.90%	-1.58%
Liberal	Val Thompson	4,172	38.98%	-5.33%
New Democratic	Pat Peters	1,833	17.12%	6.91%
Total		10,704	–	–
Rejected		55	–	
Eligible voters / Turnout		14,971	71.50%	-1.81%
Source(s) Source: Manitoba. Chief Electoral Officer (1999). Statement of Votes for the 37th Provincial General Election, September 21, 2089 (PDF) (Report). Winnipeg: Elections Manitoba.

=== 1999 ===
1999 Manitoba general election
Party	Candidate	Votes	%	±%	Expenditures
Progressive Conservative	Marcel Laurendeau	4,152	46.14	+2.24	$26,724.22
New Democratic	Marilyn Brick	3,483	38.69	+21.57	$10,804.00
Liberal	Mohinder Dhillon	1,313	14.59	-25.39	$17,998.46
Total valid votes		8,947	–	–	
Rejected and declined votes		52	–	–	
Turnout		8,999	72.96	0.76%	
Registered voters		12,380	–	–	
Source(s) Source: Manitoba. Chief Electoral Officer (1999). Statement of Votes for the 37th Provincial General Election, September 21, 2092 (PDF) (Report). Winnipeg: Elections Manitoba.

=== 2003 ===
2003 Manitoba general election
Party	Candidate	Votes	%	±%	Expenditures
New Democratic	Marilyn Brick	3,355	48.68	+7.99	$12,670.25
Progressive Conservative	Marcel Laurendeau	2,610	37.87	−8.27	$24,397.23
Liberal	Jocelyn Greenwood	741	10.75	−3.84	$8,473.22
Green	Keith Barber	186	2.70	+2.70	$117.06
Total valid votes		6,892	–	–	
Rejected		28	–	–	
Eligible voters / turnout		11,911	57.86	−14.40	
Source(s) Source: Manitoba. Chief Electoral Officer (2003). Statement of Votes for the 38th Provincial General Election, June 3, 2003 (PDF) (Report). Winnipeg: Elections Manitoba.

=== 2007 ===
2007 Manitoba general election
Party	Candidate	Votes	%	±%	Expenditures
New Democratic	Marilyn Brick	4,044	53.74	+9.08	$18,993.62
Progressive Conservative	Tara Brousseau	2,404	31.94	−5.93	$28,159.72
Liberal	Wendy Bloomfield	1,077	14.31	+3.58	$19,690.78
Total		7,525	–	–	
Rejected		29	–	–	
Eligible voters / turnout		11,552	65.14	+7.28	
Source(s) Source: Manitoba. Chief Electoral Officer (2007). Statement of Votes for the 39th Provincial General Election, May 22, 2007 (PDF) (Report). Winnipeg: Elections Manitoba.

=== 2011 ===
2011 Manitoba general election
Party	Candidate	Votes	%	±%	Expenditures
New Democratic	Dave Gaudreau	3,966	45.15	-8.59	$25,959.60
Progressive Conservative	Karen Velthuys	3,935	44.80	12.85	$32,439.47
Liberal	Marcel Laurendeau	883	10.05	-4.26	$31,742.60
Total valid votes		8,784	–	–	
Rejected		41	–		
Eligible voters / turnout		13,736	64.25	-1.22	
Source(s) Source: Manitoba. Chief Electoral Officer (2011). Statement of Votes for the 40th Provincial General Election, October 4, 2011 (PDF) (Report). Winnipeg: Elections Manitoba. "Election Returns: 40th General Election". Elections Manitoba. 2011.

=== 2016 ===
2016 Manitoba general election
Party	Candidate	Votes	%	±%	Expenditures
Progressive Conservative	Jon Reyes	4,673	51.02	6.22	$36,660.34
New Democratic	Dave Gaudreau	3,062	33.43	-11.72	$24,532.06
Liberal	James Bloomfield	1,251	13.66	3.60	$38,985.78
Independent	Narinder Kaur Johar	174	1.90	–	$5,367.70
Total valid votes / expense limit		9,160	–	–	$44,386.00
Rejected		134	–		
Eligible voters / turnout		14,278	65.09	0.85	
Source(s) Source: Manitoba. Chief Electoral Officer (2016). Statement of Votes for the 41st Provincial General Election, April 19, 2016 (PDF) (Report). Winnipeg: Elections Manitoba. "Election Returns: 41st General Election". Elections Manitoba. 2016.

== Previous boundaries ==
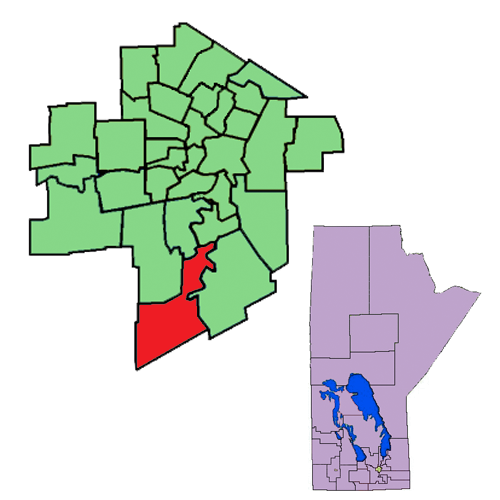
The 1999–2011 boundaries for St. Norbert highlighted in red

== See also ==
- List of Manitoba provincial electoral districts
- Canadian provincial electoral districts
