= George William Allan (Manitoba politician) =

Canadian politician (1860–1940)

George William Allan Jr.

Member of Parliament for Winnipeg South
- In office 1917–1921
- Preceded by: None - new riding created from Winnipeg
- Succeeded by: Albert Hudson

Personal details
- Born: August 13, 1860 Toronto, Province of Canada
- Died: December 6, 1940 (aged 80) Victoria, British Columbia, Canada
- Party: Unionist

George William Allan KC (August 13, 1860 – December 6, 1940) was a Canadian lawyer and politician.

== Life and career ==
Born in Toronto, his father, George William Allan Sr., served in the Senate of Canada for 35 years, including a term as Speaker of the Senate. The younger Allan moved during his adult life to Winnipeg, Manitoba, where he was elected to one term in the House of Commons of Canada in the 1917 election as the Unionist Member of Parliament for Winnipeg South.

Allan's grandfather was William Allan, member of the Home District and Legislative Council of Upper Canada.

Allan was married to Muriel Hester Wragge and had five children:

- Jocelyn Otillie Allan (1897–?)
- Enid Carlyon Allan (1899–?)
- George William Allan (1902–?)
- Arthur Carlyne "Tony" Allan (1907–?)
- Edmund Allan (1913–?)

He died in Victoria, British Columbia in 1940 and was buried in Winnipeg.
