= George William Allan =

Canadian lawyer and politician

The Honourable George William Allan PC FRGS FZS
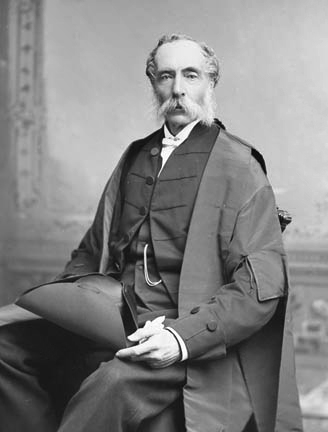
- Allan in May 1888

11th Mayor of Toronto
- In office 1855–1855
- Preceded by: Joshua George Beard
- Succeeded by: John Beverley Robinson

Canadian Senator from Ontario
- In office October 23, 1867 – July 24, 1901

Personal details
- Born: January 9, 1822 York, Upper Canada
- Died: July 24, 1901 (aged 79) Toronto, Ontario, Canada
- Party: Conservative
- Spouse(s): Louisa Maud Robinson; Adelaide Schreiber
- Children: 6, including George

George William Allan, PC, FRGS, FZS (January 9, 1822 – July 24, 1901), was a Canadian lawyer and politician. He served as the 11th Mayor of Toronto and later as Speaker of the Senate of Canada.

== Life and career ==
Born January 9, 1822, in York, Upper Canada, Allan attended Upper Canada College and served with the Bank Rifle Corps when it helped put down the 1837 Upper Canada Rebellion. He went on to study law and was called to the bar in 1846 when he also married his first wife, Louisa Maud Robinson.

Allan travelled extensively before beginning his law practice. He toured Europe, the Nile River, Syria, the Holy Land, Turkey, and Greece giving him a lifelong appreciation of travel and winning him election to the Royal Geographical Society.

He was a Toronto alderman from 1849 until 1855, when he was elected the 11th Mayor of Toronto. In 1858, he entered national politics representing York on the Legislative Council until Canadian Confederation. In 1867, he was nominated to the Senate of Canada as one of its first members and sat as a Conservative. In 1869, he was appointed government trustee for municipal bond fund of the Toronto and Nipissing Railway. He was chairman of the Standing Committee on Banking and Commerce for many years and was Speaker from 1888 until 1891. He remained in the Upper House until his death in 1901.

Allan's interests included education, science, culture and art. He was the most important patron of the artist, Paul Kane, enabling him to live a life as a professional artist, and presided over such bodies as the Royal Canadian Institute, the Ontario Society of Artists, the Toronto Conservatory of Music and the Ontario Historical Society. He served as chancellor of Trinity College. He donated to the city of Toronto a piece of land which formed the nucleus of Allan Gardens. He was also active in the Synod of the Church of England and was president of the Upper Canada Bible Society. He died on July 24, 1901, aged 79, at his residence, Moss Park, in Toronto.

== Family ==
Allan's father was William Allan, of York (Toronto). William Allan was a pioneer who settled what was then the Township of York during John Graves Simcoe's term as governor. William Allan eventually became the city's first postmaster and was appointed to the Legislative Council of Upper Canada. He was a supporter of the Family Compact and was also a member of the Orange Order in Canada.

Allan's mother was Leah Tyrer Gamble, daughter of John Gamble. She died in Toronto on October 17, 1848, aged 58.

After the death of Allan's first wife, Louisa Robinson, he married Adelaide Schreiber, with whom he had 6 children: George William Allan, Jr., Arthur, Bingham, Maye, Maude, and Audrey.

== Gallery ==
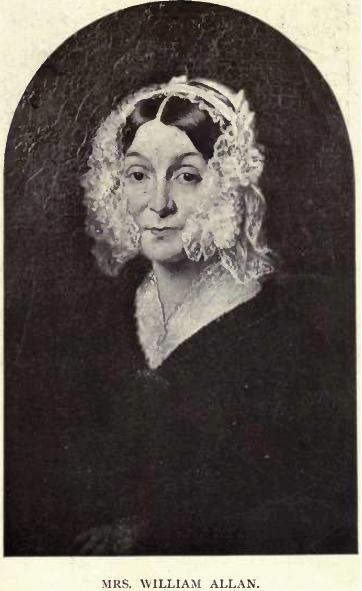
Allan's mother, Leah

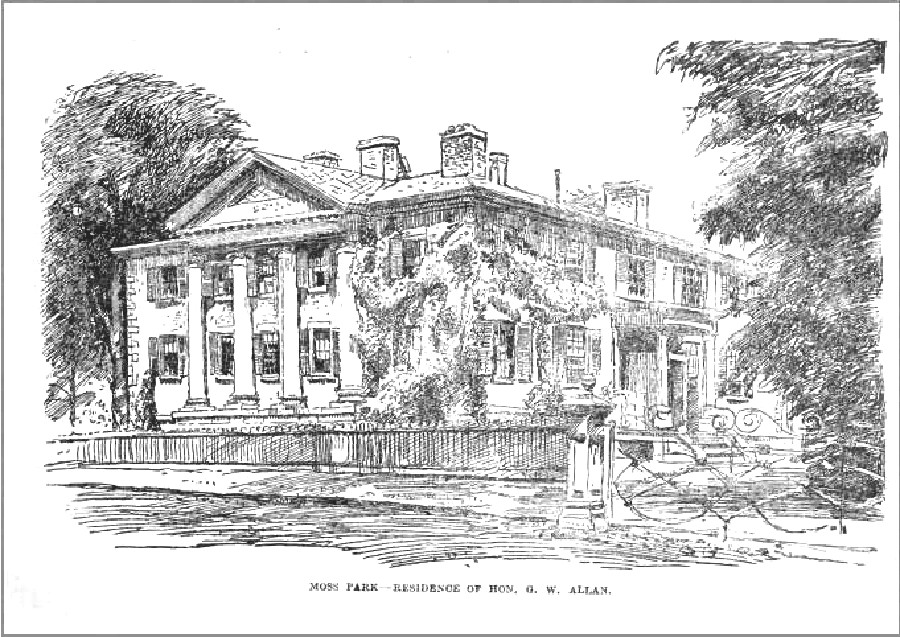
Moss Park, Allan's residence

Professional and academic associations
Preceded by Sir John Beverley Robinson	President of the Royal Canadian Institute	Succeeded by William Henry Draper

Academic offices
Preceded by The Hon. John Hillyard Cameron	Chancellor of the University of Trinity College; 1877–1901	Succeeded by Christopher Robinson
