= Dorothy Dobbie =

Canadian politician

Dorothy Dobbie CM

Member of Parliament for Winnipeg South
- In office 21 November 1988 – 24 October 1993
- Preceded by: constituency established
- Succeeded by: Reg Alcock

Personal details
- Born: 5 January 1945 (age 81)
- Party: Progressive Conservative
- Children: 1

Dorothy Ina Elgiva Dobbie CM (born 5 January 1945) is a Canadian businesswoman and former politician. She served in the House of Commons of Canada from 1988 to 1993, as a Progressive Conservative Member of Parliament (MP) for the riding of Winnipeg South.

Dobbie was a publisher before entering political life, and was a founder of Association Publications Ltd. She was the first woman to serve as president of the Winnipeg Chamber of Commerce. In 1983, she was named Outstanding Business Citizen of the Year by the Manitoba Chamber of Commerce.

In 2012, Dobbie was awarded the Queen's Diamond Jubilee Medal for her contributions and achievements as a Canadian citizen.

== Politics ==
Dobbie was elected to the House of Commons in the 1988 election, defeating Liberal candidate Allan Kaufman by 715 votes to win the federal riding of Winnipeg South, re-created by the federal electoral boundary redistribution of 1987. The Progressive Conservatives won a majority government in the election, and Dobbie entered parliament as a government backbencher.

She served as parliamentary secretary to seven different ministers between 1989 and 1993, and was a member of fifteen committees. Dobbie acted as co-chair, alongside Claude Castonguay, on the Special Joint Committee on a Renewed Canada, and the committee's recommendations on constitutional reform later formed the basis of the government's 1992 Charlottetown Accord, which was defeated in a national referendum.

Dobbie supported Jean Charest's bid to succeed Prime Minister Brian Mulroney as Progressive Conservative leader in 1993 (Winnipeg Free Press, 11 June 1993), and retained her own nomination for the next federal election over a challenge from Charles Maximilian (Winnipeg Free Press, 16 March 1993).

The PC Party was resoundingly defeated in the 1993 election, losing all but two of its House of Commons seats. Dobbie lost her candidate's deposit, receiving 6,432 votes (12.29%) for a third-place finish against Liberal Reg Alcock. During the campaign, she accused the rival Reform Party of being controlled by Christian fundamentalists and criticized her own party for running advertisements that mocked Liberal leader Jean Chrétien's facial deformity (Winnipeg Free Press, 17 October 1993). She also called for the abolition of the Senate of Canada (Winnipeg Free Press, 18 July 1993).

After Charest's resignation as Progressive Conservative Party leader in 1998, she endorsed former prime minister Joe Clark in his successful bid to succeed him (Toronto Star, 29 June 1998).

Dobbie opposed the Progressive Conservative Party's merger with the Canadian Alliance in 2003, citing concern over unclear agendas of the new party, and she later endorsed Glen Murray, the former mayor of Winnipeg who ran as a Liberal candidate in the 2004 federal election in Charleswood—St. James—Assiniboia. When Sinclair Stevens, another former Progressive Conservative MP, launched an ultimately unsuccessful lawsuit to try to block the merger, Dobbie was one of eleven other party members who openly backed the affidavit.

== Post-political work ==
Dobbie helped to found Pegasus Publications Inc. in 1996, and still serves as its president. She is now the publisher of Manitoba Gardener, Ontario Gardener and Alberta Gardener magazines, and has written several articles on gardening. With her daughter, Shauna Dobbie, she has written The Book of 10 Neat Things, a book of horticultural advice which has been published in at least two editions.

In 1997, Dobbie was appointed to the Canadian Broadcast Standards Council, Prairie Region.

In 2004, Dobbie was appointed a board member of Tree Canada. She served as chair from 2008 to 2011.

== Electoral history ==
1993 Canadian federal election: Winnipeg South
Party	Candidate	Votes	%	Expenditures
Liberal	Reg Alcock	25,950	49.60	$39,157
Reform	Mark Hughes	14,822	28.33	$49,384
Progressive Conservative	Dorothy Dobbie	6,432	12.29	$23,095
National	Shirley Loewen	2,512	4.80	$21,347
New Democratic	Rose Buss	2,180	4.17	$424
Natural Law	Richard Lepinsky	197	0.38	$231
Rhinoceros	Mike Olito	113	0.22	$728
Marxist–Leninist	Rubin Kantorovich	68	0.13	$216
Canada Party	Bill Martens	44	0.08	$140
Total valid votes		52,318	100.00	
Total rejected ballots		214		
Turnout		52,532	72.35	
Electors on lists		72,611		
Source: Thirty-fifth General Election, 1993: Official Voting Results, Published by the Chief Electoral Officer of Canada. Financial figures taken from official contributions and expenses provided by Elections Canada.

1988 Canadian federal election: Winnipeg South
Party	Candidate	Votes	%
Progressive Conservative	Dorothy Dobbie	22,865	45.9
Liberal	Allan Kaufman	22,150	44.5
New Democratic	Len Van Roon	3,151	6.3
Reform	Gary Cummings	1,428	2.9
Libertarian	Jim Weidman	168	0.3
Total valid votes		49,762	100.0
