= Lord Roberts (electoral district) =

Defunct provincial electoral district in Manitoba, Canada

Coordinates: 49.865°N 97.145°W

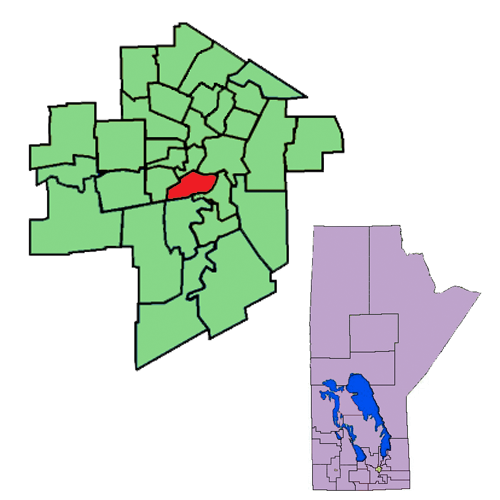
The 1999–2011 boundaries for the Lord Roberts electoral district highlighted in red.

Lord Roberts was a provincial electoral district of Manitoba, Canada, located in the south-central section of the city of Winnipeg. It was created by redistribution in 1999, and consists primarily of territory taken from the now-defunct ridings of Osborne and Crescentwood. The district is named after Field Marshal Lord Roberts.

Lord Roberts was bordered to the south by Fort Garry and St. Vital, to the west by River Heights, to the north by Fort Rouge and St. Boniface and to the east by St. Vital.

Lord Roberts' population in 1996 was 20,469. The average family income in 1999 was $44,963, with an unemployment rate of 7.70%. Thirty-one per cent of the riding's residents are listed as low income. Over 47% of the riding's dwelling houses in 1999 were rental units, and over 20% of the riding's families were single-parent.

Over 19% of the riding's population was above 65 years of age. 14% per cent of the riding's residents were immigrants, including 5% German and 4% Ukrainian. Four percent of the riding's residents were Jewish.

The service sector accounts for 19% of Lord Roberts's industry, followed by 13% in health and social services.

The riding was only ever held by the New Democratic Party of Manitoba (NDP), and was generally considered safe for the party. Its only MLA was Diane McGifford, who was re-elected in 2003 with over 60% of the riding's popular vote.

For the 2011 election, the riding was dissolved into Fort Rouge, River Heights, and the new riding of Fort Garry-Riverview

== Members of the Legislative Assembly ==
Name	Party	Took office	Left office
Diane McGifford	NDP	1999	2011

== Electoral results ==
2007 Manitoba general election
Party	Candidate	Votes	%	±%	Expenditures
New Democratic	Diane McGifford	4,499	57.86%	+4.87	$23,588.33
Progressive Conservative	Wilf Makus	1,367	17.58%	−9.50	$3,999.86
Liberal	Larry Schenkeveld	1,219	15.68%	−2.28	$2,057.12
Green	Vere Scott	655	8.42%	+7.04	$37.30
Total valid votes		7,740	99.54		
Rejected and declined votes		36			
Turnout		7,776	55.56	+1.87	
Electors on the lists		13,996			

2003 Manitoba general election
Party	Candidate	Votes	%	±%	Expenditures
New Democratic	Diane McGifford	4,352	61.69	+8.70	$13,278.88
Progressive Conservative	Andrew Hymers	1,179	16.71	−10.37	$984.54
Liberal	Ali Lamont	982	13.92	−4.04	$6,196.49
Green	Vere Scott	442	6.27	+4.92	$316.47
Libertarian	Andy Caisse	66	0.94	$0.00	
Total valid votes		7,021	99.52		
Rejected and declined votes		34			
Turnout		7,055	53.69	−15.59	
Electors on the lists		13,141			

1999 Manitoba general election
Party	Candidate	Votes	%	±%	Expenditures
New Democratic	Diane McGifford	5,240	52.99		$25,700.00
Progressive Conservative	Maggie Nishimura	2,678	27.08		$17,064.57
Liberal	Allen Mills	1,776	17.96	–	$13,560.50
Green	Lyle Ford	136	1.38	–	$127.62
Total valid votes		9,831	99.42		
Rejected and declined votes		57			
Turnout		9,888	69.28		
Electors on the lists		14,272			

== See also ==
- List of Manitoba provincial electoral districts
- Canadian provincial electoral districts
