= Leslie Mutch =

Canadian politician

Member of Parliament for Winnipeg South
- In office October 1935 – June 1953

Personal details
- Born: Leslie Alexander Mutch; 14 January 1897 Crystal City, Manitoba
- Died: 2 January 1977 (aged 79) Ottawa, Ontario
- Party: Liberal
- Spouse(s): Corra M. Travis (m. 28 June 1921)
- Profession: advertising executive, agent, teacher

Leslie Alexander Mutch (14 January 1897 – 2 January 1977) was a Liberal Party member of the House of Commons of Canada. He was born in Crystal City, Manitoba. His career included jobs as an advertising executive for Eaton's, a life insurance agent and a teacher.

Mutch graduated from the University of Manitoba in 1921 with a Bachelor of Arts and earned a Master of Arts degree there as well in 1929. He entered military service for World War I under the Queen's Own Cameron Highlanders, leaving the military in August 1945.

He was first elected to Parliament at the Winnipeg South riding in the 1935 general election then re-elected in 1940, 1945 and 1949, thus serving in the 18th through 21st Canadian Parliaments. He served as a backbench supporter of the governments led by William Lyon Mackenzie King and from 1948, Louis St. Laurent throughout his political career. He did not seek re-election in 1953.
