= Diane McGifford =

Canadian politician

Minister of Advanced Education and Literacy
- In office September 21, 2006 – March 28, 2011
- Premier: Gary Doer; Greg Selinger
- Preceded by: new portfolio
- Succeeded by: Erin Selby

Minister of Advanced Education and Training
- In office January 17, 2001 – September 21, 2006
- Premier: Gary Doer
- Preceded by: new portfolio
- Succeeded by: portfolio abolished

Minister of Culture, Heritage and Tourism
- In office October 5, 1999 – January 17, 2001
- Premier: Gary Doer
- Preceded by: Rosemary Vodrey
- Succeeded by: Ron Lemieux

Member of the Legislative Assembly of Manitoba for Lord Roberts Osborne 1995–1999
- In office September 21, 1999 – October 4, 2011
- Preceded by: new constituency
- Succeeded by: constituency abolished
- In office April 25, 1995 – September 21, 1999
- Preceded by: Norma McCormick
- Succeeded by: constituency abolished

Personal details
- Born: March 26, 1945 (age 81) Manchester, United Kingdom
- Party: New Democratic Party
- Education: University of Manitoba

Diane Ethel McGifford (born March 26, 1945) is a former Manitoba politician, and was a member of cabinet under Premiers Gary Doer and Greg Selinger.

McGifford was born in Manchester, England, and moved to Manitoba at a young age. She was educated at the University of Manitoba, receiving a Bachelor of Arts degree in 1970, a Master of Arts degree in 1974, and a Ph.D. in English in 1979. She subsequently worked as a professor at the University of Saskatchewan, the University of Manitoba and the University of Winnipeg, and has served as a director of the Fort Garry Women's Resource Centre and Kali-Shiva AIDS Services. McGifford has edited Shakti's Words: An Anthology of South Asian Canadian Women's Poetry and The Geography of Voice: Canadian Literature of the South Asian Diaspora.

McGifford was elected to the Legislative Assembly of Manitoba in the provincial election of 1995, defeating incumbent Liberal Norma McCormick by almost one thousand votes in the central Winnipeg riding of Osborne. She was easily re-elected in the 1999 election in the redistributed riding of Lord Roberts.

The New Democratic Party won the election of 1999, and McGifford was appointed to Premier Gary Doer's first cabinet as Minister of Culture, Heritage and Tourism on October 5, 1999.

On January 17, 2001, she was transferred to the Ministry of Advanced Education and Training. On her initial appointment to cabinet, she was also given responsibility for the Status of Women and Seniors, and the administration of the Manitoba Lotteries Corporation Act. She was relieved of the last responsibility on September 25, 2002, and of the first two on November 4, 2003.

In 2003, McGifford supported Bill Blaikie's campaign to become leader of the federal New Democratic Party.

McGifford was easily re-elected in the 2003 provincial election, and again in the 2007 provincial election. She was replaced as Minister of Advanced Education and Literacy by Southdale MLA Erin Selby, in a brief ceremony in March 2011. McGifford did not stand for election in the 2011 Manitoba general election.

== Works ==
- McGifford, Diane (1974). William Carlos Williams' Discovery of America: A Study of In the American Grain and Paterson (MA thesis). Winnipeg, MB: University of Manitoba. OCLC 184867836.
- — (1979). Eros and Logos: The Androgynous Vision in the Mythic Narratives of Charles Williams (PhD thesis). Winnipeg, MB: University of Manitoba. OCLC 500519966.
- — (1982). "Inference, Image and Inspiration: Three about Flannery O'Connor". Canadian Review of American Studies. 13 (3). Toronto, ON: University of Toronto Press: 389–396. doi:10.3138/CRAS-013-03-10. ISSN 0007-7720. OCLC 4796898288.
- McGifford, Diane; Kearns, Judith, eds. (1990). Shakti's Words: An Anthology of South Asian Canadian Women's Poetry. Toronto, ON: TSAR Publications. ISBN 9780920661147. OCLC 0920661149.
- Johnson, Laurie Anne (1991). McGifford, Diane (ed.). Women Recovering: A Handbook for Care Providers Working with Women Recovering from Chemical Dependency. Winnipeg, MB: Women's Health Clinic. ISBN 9780969478737. OCLC 23653365.
- —, ed. (1992). The Geography of Voice: Canadian Literature of the South Asian Diaspora. Toronto, ON: TSAR Publications. ISBN 978-0920661277. OCLC 28966685.
- Dickie, Bonnie (director); Bowen, Chantal (producer); McGifford, Diane (researcher) et al. (1993). A Web Not a Ladder (motion picture). National Film Board of Canada. OCLC 71759626.
- McGifford, Diane (1993). "Suniti Namjoshi". In Nelson, Emmanuel S. (ed.). Writers of the Indian Diaspora: A Bio-Bibliographical Critical Sourcebook. Westport, CT: Greenwood Press. ISBN 978-0313279041. OCLC 26552955.
- —; Kearns, Judith, eds. (1993) [First published 1990]. Shakti's Words: An Anthology of South Asian Canadian Women's Poetry (2nd ed.). Toronto, ON: TSAR Publications. ISBN 978-0920661291.
- Barrett, Becky; Cerelli, Marianne; Mackintosh, Gordon; McGifford, Diane (1995). Ending the Terror: Towards Zero Tolerance. Winnipeg, MB: New Democratic Party of Manitoba. ISBN 9780969478737. OCLC 237162896.71759626

Political offices
Preceded by Herself as Manitoba Minister of Advanced Education and Training	Manitoba Minister of Advanced Education and Literacy; September 21, 2006 – March 28, 2011	Succeeded by Erin Selby
Preceded by James McCrae as Manitoba Minister of Education and Training	Manitoba Minister of Advanced Education and Training; January 17, 2001 – September 21, 2006	Succeeded by Herself as Manitoba Minister of Advanced Education and Literacy
Preceded by James McCrae as Manitoba Minister of Education and Training	Manitoba Minister of Advanced Education and Training; January 17, 2001 – September 21, 2006	Succeeded by Scott Smith as Manitoba Minister of Competitiveness, Training and Trade
Preceded by Rosemary Vodrey as Manitoba Minister of Culture, Heritage and Citizenship	Manitoba Minister of Culture, Heritage and Tourism; October 5, 1999 – January 17, 2001	Succeeded by Ron Lemieux
Legislative Assembly of Manitoba
New constituency	Member of the Legislative Assembly for Lord Roberts; September 21, 1999 – October 4, 2011	Constituency abolished
Preceded by Norma McCormick	Member of the Legislative Assembly for Osborne; April 25, 1995 – September 21, 1999	Constituency abolished
