= Rod Bruinooge =

Canadian politician (born 1973)

Rod E. Bruinooge
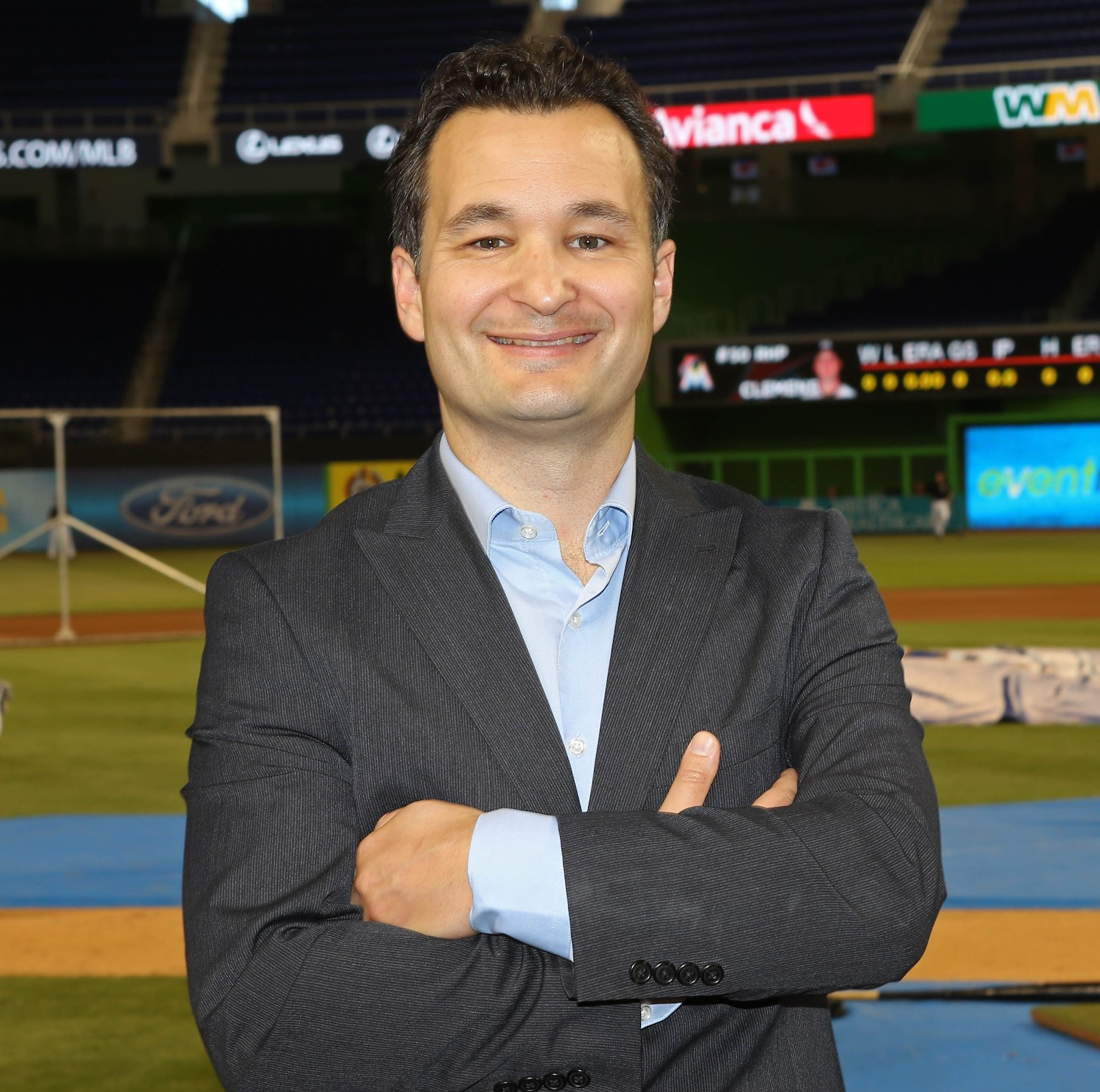
- Rod Bruinooge 2016

Member of Parliament for Winnipeg South
- In office January 23, 2006 – October 19, 2015
- Preceded by: Reg Alcock
- Succeeded by: Terry Duguid

Personal details
- Born: May 6, 1973 (age 53) Thompson, Manitoba, Canada
- Party: Conservative
- Spouse: Chantale Bruinooge
- Education: University of Manitoba (BA)
- Profession: Politician; entrepreneur; executive director; film producer

Rod E. Bruinooge (born May 6, 1973) is an Indigenous Canadian politician, businessman, and filmmaker. He was elected as the Member of Parliament (MP) for Winnipeg South in the 2006 federal election, and was the Parliamentary Secretary to the Minister of Indian Affairs and Northern Development and the Federal Interlocutor for Métis and Non-Status Indians from 2006 until the fall of 2008.

Bruinooge is a member of the Conservative Party of Canada, and is an Indigenous Canadian of Métis descent. He retired from parliament at the 2015 federal election. Bruinooge became CEO of Eventride in May 2016. Bruinooge was later appointed the first Indigenous Film Commissioner for Manitoba in 2021. Later, Bruinooge was appointed the chief executive officer of the Manitoba Research Network in 2024.

== Early life and career ==
Bruinooge's father originated from Wemeldinge, Netherlands. After moving to Canada, he married an Indigenous woman. Bruinooge himself was born in Thompson, Manitoba, and holds a Bachelor of Arts degree in political science from the University of Manitoba. He attended the Progressive Conservative Party of Canada's 1993 leadership convention as a youth delegate, supporting Kim Campbell. Bruinooge became chief executive and president of Abject Modernity Internet Creations Ltd. in the late 1990s, and worked as a consultant.

Bruinooge has served as a director of the River View Health Centre and the Manitoba Children's Museum, and has done organizational work for the Winnipeg Aboriginal Film and Video Festival and the North American Indigenous Games.

== The Stone ==
Bruinooge developed an internet game/mystery entitled The Stone in 1995, and launched it as a consumer product in 1997. The game was strongly influenced by the Publius Enigma, a conceptual mystery involving hidden messages in the cover art of Pink Floyd's The Division Bell (1994). The Stone was profiled by Forbes magazine in 1999 and has been featured in other international journals including USA Today and Entertainment weekly.

In February 1999, Bruinooge held a launch event at Time Square in New York City, where 999 copies of The Stone were handed out to guests. Significant media coverage of the launch occurred including CNN and other New York based news stations.

The Stone was completed in 2007 and Bruinooge was active in its final deployment.

== Film and television ==
In September 2004, Bruinooge and co-director Scott Jaworski released a film entitled Stoners, covering the activities of an internet gaming community that emerged around The Stone. The film features several tracks from The Division Bell in its soundtrack, used with Pink Floyd's permission.

Bruinooge started the Winnipeg International Film Festival in 2005, and was its executive director until February 2006. The festival including a screening of Stoners during its first year. Some in Winnipeg's arts community believed it was inappropriate for Bruinooge to screen his own film, although it was screened out of competition.

In 2020 Bruinooge appeared in an episode of CBC's Burden of Truth alongside Kristin Kreuk as a First Nation relative of recurring character Cody Chartrand (season 3, episode 4). Rod Bruinooge is a member of the Alliance of Canadian Cinema, Television and Radio Artists union, (ACTRA) since 2019.

Bruinooge was appointed Interim-CEO for the provincial crown agency Manitoba Film and Music in 2021 and became Canada's first Indigenous Film Commissioner at that time. During his career as Film Commissioner Bruinooge led a delegation of film industry and government officials on a mission to Los Angeles on the maiden voyage of Winnipeg's first direct flight.

== Political career ==
=== Candidate ===
Bruinooge was a frequent candidate for public office before his election in 2006. He first sought the provincial Progressive Conservative nomination for Riel in 2002, but withdrew when it became clear that the nomination date would be in flux for some time.

He later campaigned as the Conservative candidate for Winnipeg South in the 2004 federal election. One of his more creative campaign advertisements was a self-directed, fifteen-second promotional film entitled "Big Tobacco", which compared Paul Martin's efforts at government renewal to misleading tobacco advertising. The spot ran as a preview for Shrek 2 in some Winnipeg theatres.

Bruinooge was one of only three aboriginal candidates to run for the Conservative Party in the 2004 election. The Conservative Party has sometimes been depicted as hostile to aboriginal interests, and at one point in the campaign Bruinooge and party leader Stephen Harper were the targets of a protest by aboriginal activists, including David Chartrand of the Manitoba Métis Federation. Bruinooge finished second in the election against Liberal incumbent Reg Alcock.

Bruinooge sought the Conservative nomination for Winnipeg South for a second time in the spring of 2005, but lost to rival candidate Hugh McFadyen by a narrow margin. A few months later, he was defeated by McFadyen a second time in a contest for the provincial Progressive Conservative nomination in Fort Whyte. Once again, McFadyen won by a very narrow margin.

McFadyen resigned his federal nomination when he chose to run provincially, and Bruinooge was chosen as the Conservative candidate in his place. His candidacy was endorsed on January 18, 2006 by Vote Marriage Canada, a group which opposes same-sex marriage. Although Bruinooge is a member of the Manitoba Métis Federation, that organization endorsed Reg Alcock.

Bruinooge defeated Alcock by 111 votes on election day, in what most political observers described as a significant upset. Bruinooge was aided by a national trend toward his party, as well as by Alcock's decision to spend most of his time canvassing with Liberal candidates in other ridings.

=== Parliamentarian ===
The Conservatives won a minority government in the 2006 election. In early February 2006, Bruinooge was appointed parliamentary secretary to the Minister of Indian Affairs and Northern Development and the Federal Interlocutor for Métis and Non-Status Indians. He was the only Aboriginal member of the Government benches until Rob Clarke was elected on the byelections of March 17, 2008. In January 2007, he represented his government in signing a deal with Siemens that was designed to increase aboriginal employment.

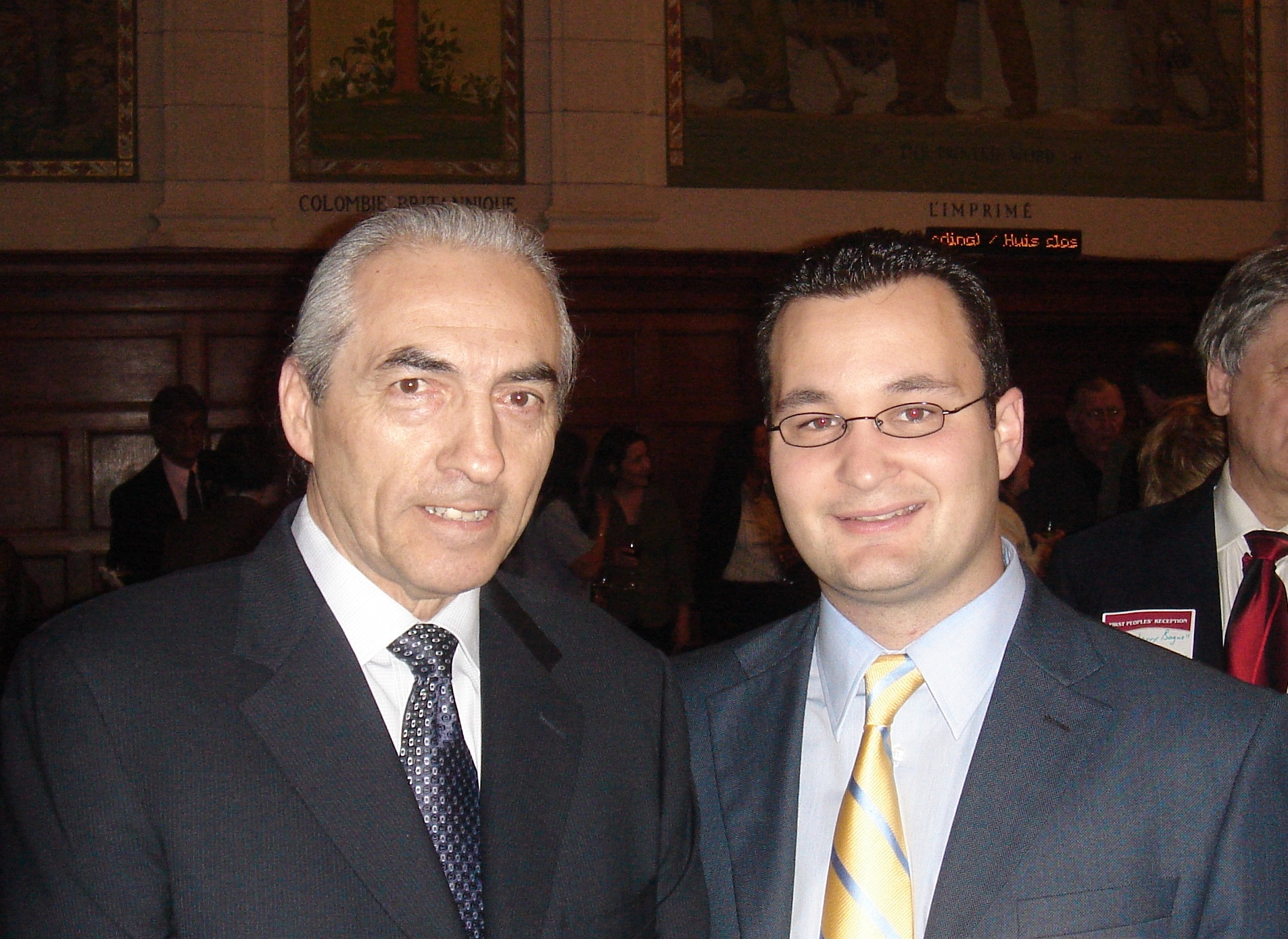
Rod Bruinooge and Phil Fontaine in the House of Commons

During his tenure as Parliamentary Secretary Bruinooge was tasked with managing the enabling legislation for both the Indian Residential Schools Settlement Agreement and the Truth and Reconciliation Commission of Canada through the House of Commons and Committee. On June 11, 2008 during Canada's official apology to the victims of Residential Schools, Bruinooge had the honour of being part of the official delegation walking into the House of Commons with the four Indigenous leaders and the prime minister.

At the Assembly of First Nations General Assembly in Nova Scotia in July 2007, Bruinooge described the Paul Martin government's Kelowna Accord on aboriginal investment as nothing more than an "expensive press release". This statement was strongly criticized by Assembly of First Nations leader Phil Fontaine. In the same month, Bruinooge vocally supported the Harper government's efforts to place Canada's Indian Act under the provisions of the Canadian Human Rights Act. Some native groups have argued that the Human Rights Act's focus on individual rights will undermine the communal rights of aboriginal communities.

Bruinooge was then tasked with managing the legislation providing First Nation reserves with access to the Canadian Human Rights Act. Though this Act started controversially, in the end Bruinooge was able to successfully negotiate with opposition parties and First Nation leaders to pass Bill C-21. First Nations child welfare advocate, Cindy Blackstock, then filed a claim on behalf of First Nations children to the Canadian Human Rights Tribunal which only became valid after the passing of C-21. On April 3, 2023, after nearly 2 decades of effort, Blackstock would settle with the federal government for 23 Billion dollars on behalf on First Nations children impacted by the child welfare system, all due to her initial claim.

In January 2008, Bruinooge said that the Harper government was considering adapting provincial funding models in British Columbia and Alberta to address education and child-welfare programs in Manitoba.

In the minutes after it was announced that the Order of Canada was being presented to abortion provider and pro-choice advocate Henry Morgentaler on Canada Day 2008, Rod Bruinooge called the award "Reprehensible".

He was re-elected over Liberal candidate John Loewen in the 2008 federal election. Immediately after the election, Bruinooge turned down an offer to become Parliamentary Secretary for INAC, citing a desire to focus his attention on the riding and spend more time with his family.

In December 2008, Rod Bruinooge was elected Chair of the Parliamentary Pro Life Caucus and was reported by the Canadian Press as stating that unborn children had less legal value in Canada than a human kidney.

In February 2009, Bruinooge founded the Conservative Post-Secondary Education Caucus to which he was elected chair. In April 2013, Bruinooge led a Post-Secondary Education Caucus Delegation to Washington D.C., to meet with American leaders in Post-Secondary Education, including a visit to Georgetown University. Bruinooge is also vice-chair of the Canada-U.S. Interparliamentary Group and the Canada-Holland Friendship Group. He is also a member of the Standing Committee on Canadian Heritage.

In May 2011, Bruinooge wrote an op-ed that ran nationally celebrating the renewal of Winnipeg in conjunction with the return of the Winnipeg Jets. Bruinooge argued that Winnipeg was North America's best kept secret with new attractions such as the Canadian Museum for Human Rights and updated infrastructure like the Winnipeg James Armstrong Richardson International Airport.

In May 2011 Bruinooge defeated his Liberal opponent in the spring election with a plurality over 50%. In the fall of 2011 there was some speculation that Bruinooge would seek the leadership of the Progressive Conservative party of Manitoba. On January 4, 2012 the Winnipeg Free Press reported that Bruinooge would remain in Ottawa and not seek the leadership.

Bruinooge held a consultation in Winnipeg with industry and business leaders from across Manitoba to discuss a renewal of the government's Global Commerce Strategy.

Bruinooge announced his plans to not seek re-election in January 2015.

== Electoral record ==
2011 Canadian federal election: Winnipeg South
Party	Candidate	Votes	%	±%	Expenditures
Conservative	Rod Bruinooge	22,840	52.24	+3.41	$74,282.37
Liberal	Terry Duguid	14,296	32.70	-2.10	$65,648.93
New Democratic	Dave Gaudreau	5,693	13.02	+1.59	$8,116.60
Green	Caitlin McIntyre	889	2.03	-2.47	$564.35
Total valid votes/expense limit		43,718	100.00		–
Total rejected ballots		187	0.43	-0.01	
Turnout		43,905	69.80	+4.17	
Eligible voters		62,902	–	–	

2008 Canadian federal election: Winnipeg South
Party	Candidate	Votes	%	±%	Expenditures
Conservative	Rod Bruinooge	19,954	48.83	+7.42	$74,312
Liberal	John Loewen	14,221	34.80	-6.35	$73,677
New Democratic	Sean Robert	4,673	11.43	-2.29	$9,507
Green	David Cosby	1,839	4.50	+1.42	$3,312
Christian Heritage	Heidi Loewen-Steffano	173	0.42	-0.19	$804
Total valid votes/expense limit		40,860	100.00		$78,463
Total rejected ballots		179	0.44	+0.1	
Turnout		41,039	65.63	-3.78	
Conservative hold		Swing		+6.9	

2006 Canadian federal election: Winnipeg South
Party	Candidate	Votes	%	Expenditures
Conservative	Rod Bruinooge	17,328	41.42	$68,461.08
Liberal	Reg Alcock	17,217	41.15	$57,453.38
New Democratic	Robert Page	5,743	13.73	$1,973.24
Green	Wesley Owen Whiteside	1,289	3.08	–
Christian Heritage	Heidi Loewen-Steffano	259	0.62	$503.33
Total valid votes		41,836	100.00	
Total rejected ballots		111		
Turnout		41,947	70.39	
Electors on the lists		59,594		
Sources: Official Results, Elections Canada and Financial Returns, Elections Canada.

2004 Canadian federal election: Winnipeg South
Party	Candidate	Votes	%	Expenditures
Liberal	Reg Alcock	19,270	51.31	$63,885.73
Conservative	Rod Bruinooge	12,770	34.00	$67,207.73
New Democratic	Catherine Green	4,217	11.23	$6,919.66
Green	Ron Cameron	1,003	2.67	$702.79
Christian Heritage	Jane MacDiarmid	296	0.79	$4,202.05
Total valid votes		37,556	100.00	
Total rejected ballots		110		
Turnout		37,666	63.23	
Electors on the lists		59,572		
Percentage change figures are factored for redistribution. Conservative Party percentages are contrasted with the combined Canadian Alliance and Progressive Conservative percentages from 2000.
Sources: Official Results, Elections Canada and Financial Returns, Elections Canada.

All electoral information is taken from Elections Canada. Italicized expenditures refer to submitted totals, and are presented when the final reviewed totals are not available.
