= Reg Alcock =

Canadian politician (1948–2011)

The Honourable Reginald B. Alcock PC
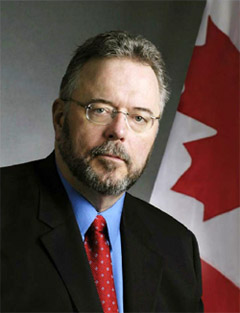

Member of Parliament for Winnipeg South
- In office October 25, 1993 – January 23, 2006
- Preceded by: Dorothy Dobbie
- Succeeded by: Rod Bruinooge

President of the Treasury Board
- In office December 12, 2003 – February 5, 2006
- Preceded by: Lucienne Robillard
- Succeeded by: John Baird

Minister responsible for the Canadian Wheat Board
- In office December 12, 2003 – February 5, 2006
- Preceded by: Ralph Goodale
- Succeeded by: Chuck Strahl

Personal details
- Born: April 16, 1948 Winnipeg, Manitoba Canada
- Died: October 14, 2011 (aged 63) Winnipeg, Manitoba, Canada
- Party: Liberal
- Spouse: Karen Taraska-Alcock
- Children: 3
- Education: Simon Fraser University (BA); Harvard University (MPA)
- Profession: Politician; businessman; consultant

Reginald B. Alcock, PC (April 16, 1948 – October 14, 2011) was a Canadian politician. He represented the riding of Winnipeg South as a Member of Parliament (MP) in the House of Commons of Canada from 1993 to 2006 and was a cabinet minister in the government of Prime Minister Paul Martin. Alcock was a member of the Liberal Party of Canada.

== Early life and career ==
Alcock was born in Winnipeg, Manitoba. He earned a bachelor's degree from Simon Fraser University and a master's degree in public administration from Harvard University. He was the director of Manitoba Child and Family Services from 1983 to 1985 and in this capacity spearheaded an effort to rewrite the province's child protection legislation. As a result of his efforts, Manitoba became the first province in Canada to introduce official protocols to deal with instances of child sex abuse. Alcock was also active with the Harvard Policy Group, which studies the effects of information technology on the public sector. He began his political career at the provincial level, working as an organizer for the Manitoba Liberal Party in the early 1980s.

Alcock was elected to the Legislative Assembly of Manitoba for the Winnipeg division of Osborne in the 1988 provincial election, in which the Manitoba Liberal Party rose from one seat to twenty under the leadership of Sharon Carstairs. He later worked as campaign manager for high-profile Liberal incumbent Lloyd Axworthy in the 1988 federal election in Winnipeg South Centre. Alcock served as official opposition house leader and finance critic and was re-elected in the 1990 provincial election despite a shift against his party. He endorsed Jean Chrétien's bid to lead the federal Liberal Party in 1990, and declared his own intention to enter federal politics in 1992.

Alcock won the Liberal nomination for Winnipeg South in early 1993, defeating rival candidate Linda Asper by only five votes on the third ballot of what proved to be a divisive contest. He won a convincing victory over incumbent Progressive Conservative incumbent Dorothy Dobbie in the 1993 federal election and entered the House as a government backbencher.

== Government backbencher ==
Alcock soon developed a reputation as one of the most technologically savvy members of parliament. In 1994, he became the first MP to coordinate his parliamentary office from his riding electronically instead of relying on permanent staff in Ottawa. At around the same time, he became the first Canadian MP to host an official website. He was appointed to the House's standing committee on Foreign Affairs and International Trade in 1995, and was named chair of the standing committee on Transport in 1997.

The Chrétien government called a new federal election for June 2, 1997, only three and a half years into its five-year mandate. The election timing was controversial in Manitoba, as it coincided with significant flooding from the Red River into Winnipeg. Alcock, along with other Manitoba Liberal MPs, requested a delay until the flooding was under control. When Chrétien called the election anyway, Alcock transformed his campaign office into a volunteer relief centre. He was personally involved in sandbagging and evacuation efforts and did not actively campaign in the first period of the election. He was nonetheless returned by a significant margin. From 1998 to 2000, he served as parliamentary secretary to the President of the Queen's Privy Council for Canada and Minister of Intergovernmental Affairs. In 1998, he brought forward a private member's bill to overturn Louis Riel's conviction for high treason and recognize him as a Father of Confederation.

Alcock was never appointed to the Chrétien Cabinet. His professional relationship with Chrétien deteriorated after 2000, and in 2002 he became the primary Manitoba organizer for Paul Martin's bid to replace Chrétien as party leader. In the same year, he became one of the first Liberal MPs to call openly for Chrétien's resignation. Alcock increased his public profile in 2003, after chairing a committee which forced privacy commissioner George Radwanski to resign from office after revelations of lax spending habits.

== Cabinet minister ==
When Paul Martin became Prime Minister of Canada on December 12, 2003, he appointed Alcock to cabinet as President of the Treasury Board, Minister responsible for the Canadian Wheat Board, and political minister responsible for Manitoba. He was also named to the government's priorities and planning committee, described as the "inner circle" of cabinet, and was appointed chair of a cabinet committee that conducted a comprehensive review of government spending.

=== Policy ===
As president of the Treasury Board, Alcock was responsible for overseeing the Canadian civil service and the spending details of government agencies. He also played a leading role in coordinating the Martin government's response to the federal sponsorship scandal, in which some bureaucrats and advertising agents in Quebec with ties to the Liberal Party had misappropriated public monies. Alcock announced a new appointment process for Crown corporation executives in 2004, and the following year he issued a new policy of management control for government agencies. He argued that these reforms would prevent similar scandals from occurring in the future. One of his more notable initiatives was the establishment of a chief audit executive for each government department and agency.

In total, Alcock brought forward 158 separate reforms for the public service in late 2005, and promised that another eighty would follow. Critics considered this to be excessive and some suggested that Alcock was micro-managing his department.

Alcock also released a comprehensive proposal for reforming Canada's regulatory system in March 2005. He argued that his reforms would reduce delays for patent drug approval and avoid the duplication of existing foreign research without compromising safety standards. Critics of the plan suggested that it could jeopardize Canadian sovereignty and lead to the adoption of American regulatory standards.

In February 2004, the National Post identified Alcock as a leading cabinet supporter of private-public partnerships.

=== Other ===
In early 2005, Alcock publicly criticized his government's opposition to the legalization of marijuana, saying, "If we actually wanted to break the back of organized crime, we would be better off to control it. When you have these things underground, what you end up fuelling is organized crime."

== 2006 election ==
Alcock unexpectedly lost his seat in the 2006 federal election, losing to Conservative challenger Rod Bruinooge by just 111 votes in Winnipeg South. Bruinooge had previously challenged Alcock in 2004. He took personal responsibility for the loss and acknowledged that he did not spend enough time campaigning in his own riding. Alcock also said that being the government's point person for the sponsorship scandal did not help his electoral prospects, though he ultimately defended his government's actions.

One of Alcock's final acts in office was to approve a payment of up to $40,000 to assist Jean Pelletier with legal fees in a court challenge against the Gomery Commission. Representatives of other parties criticized this payment, saying that the government should only cover legal costs for working civil servants. Pelletier's lawyer argued that it followed a long-standing government policy for high-ranking functionaries in judicial proceedings.

== Out of parliament ==
In March 2006, Alcock announced that he would support Belinda Stronach if she entered the contest to succeed Paul Martin as Liberal leader. Stronach announced in early April that she would not be a candidate. Several of members of Alcock's political organization later worked for Ken Dryden's campaign, and Alcock himself endorsed Dryden at the leadership convention. Dryden dropped off after the second ballot and endorsed Bob Rae and then eventual winner Stéphane Dion.

In January 2007, Alcock was appointed to the faculty of the University of Manitoba as an executive in residence at the I. H. Asper School of Business. He was also appointed as a research affiliate with the Leadership Network at the Kennedy School of Government, Harvard University.

== Death ==
Alcock died on October 14, 2011, after suffering an apparent heart attack at James Richardson International Airport in Winnipeg. He was 63 years old.

== Trivia ==
- In September 2005, Alcock donated an original painting entitled, "The view from my seat in the House of Commons, May 19, 6:10 p.m.", to a charity auction in Winnipeg. The work, a parody of Edvard Munch's The Scream, depicted Alcock's impression of the opposition Conservative caucus moments after the Liberals won a crucial confidence vote that could have forced early elections. Alcock acknowledged that the painting was mostly traced. It sold for $2,200.
- Alcock suffered weight-related health problems during his political career. Facing the prospect of severe diabetes, he reduced his weight from 430 pounds to 295 pounds in the mid-2000s.

== Electoral record ==
2006 Canadian federal election: Winnipeg South
| Party | Candidate | Votes | % | Expenditures |
|---|---|---|---|---|
| Conservative | Rod Bruinooge | 17,328 | 41.42 | $68,461.08 |
| Liberal | Reg Alcock | 17,217 | 41.15 | $57,453.38 |
| New Democratic | Robert Page | 5,743 | 13.73 | $1,973.24 |
| Green | Wesley Owen Whiteside | 1,289 | 3.08 | – |
| Christian Heritage | Heidi Loewen-Steffano | 259 | 0.62 | $503.33 |
| Total valid votes | | 41,836 | 100.00 | |
| Total rejected ballots | | 111 | | |
| Turnout | | 41,947 | 70.39 | |
| Electors on the lists | | 59,594 | | |
Sources: Official Results, Elections Canada and Financial Returns, Elections Canada.

2004 Canadian federal election: Winnipeg South
| Party | Candidate | Votes | % | Expenditures |
|---|---|---|---|---|
| Liberal | Reg Alcock | 19,270 | 51.31 | $63,885.73 |
| Conservative | Rod Bruinooge | 12,770 | 34.00 | $67,207.73 |
| New Democratic | Catherine Green | 4,217 | 11.23 | $6,919.66 |
| Green | Ron Cameron | 1,003 | 2.67 | $702.79 |
| Christian Heritage | Jane MacDiarmid | 296 | 0.79 | $4,202.05 |
| Total valid votes | | 37,556 | 100.00 | |
| Total rejected ballots | | 110 | | |
| Turnout | | 37,666 | 63.23 | |
| Electors on the lists | | 59,572 | | |
Percentage change figures are factored for redistribution. Conservative Party percentages are contrasted with the combined Canadian Alliance and Progressive Conservative percentages from 2000.
Sources: Official Results, Elections Canada and Financial Returns, Elections Canada.

2000 Canadian federal election: Winnipeg South
| Party | Candidate | Votes | % | Expenditures |
|---|---|---|---|---|
| Liberal | Reg Alcock | 21,433 | 50.94 | $61,348.98 |
| Alliance | Bill Hancock | 12,638 | 30.04 | $32,684.49 |
| New Democratic | Duane Nicol | 4,224 | 10.04 | $2,006.24 |
| Progressive Conservative | Geoffrey Lambert | 3,599 | 8.55 | $4,149.75 |
| Independent | Didz Zuzens | 183 | 0.43 | $355.12 |
| Total valid votes | | 42,077 | 100.00 | |
| Total rejected ballots | | 145 | | |
| Turnout | | 42,222 | 66.43 | |
| Electors on the lists | | 63,562 | | |
Sources: Official Results, Elections Canada and Financial Returns, Elections Canada.

1997 Canadian federal election: Winnipeg South
| Party | Candidate | Votes | % | Expenditures |
|---|---|---|---|---|
| Liberal | Reg Alcock | 18,800 | 49.57 | $53,378 |
| Reform | Greg Yost | 7,510 | 19.80 | $35,545 |
| Progressive Conservative | Bill Mackness | 6,547 | 17.26 | $38,748 |
| New Democratic | Iris Taylor | 4,629 | 12.21 | $3,062 |
| Rhinoceros | M. Rhino Olito | 191 | 0.50 | $0 |
| Natural Law | Larry Decter | 153 | 0.40 | $582 |
| Marxist–Leninist | Diane Zack | 94 | 0.25 | $11 |
| Total valid votes | | 37,924 | 100.00 | |
| Total rejected ballots | | 252 | | |
| Turnout | | 38,176 | 67.37 | |
| Electors on the lists | | 56,670 | | |
Sources: Official Results, Elections Canada and Financial Returns, Elections Canada.

1993 Canadian federal election: Winnipeg South
| Party | Candidate | Votes | % | Expenditures |
|---|---|---|---|---|
| Liberal | Reg Alcock | 25,950 | 49.60 | $39,157 |
| Reform | Mark Hughes | 14,822 | 28.33 | $49,384 |
| Progressive Conservative | Dorothy Dobbie | 6,432 | 12.29 | $23,095 |
| National | Shirley Loewen | 2,512 | 4.80 | $21,347 |
| New Democratic | Rose Buss | 2,180 | 4.17 | $424 |
| Natural Law | Richard Lepinsky | 197 | 0.38 | $231 |
| Rhinoceros | Mike Olito | 113 | 0.22 | $728 |
| Marxist–Leninist | Rubin Kantorovich | 68 | 0.13 | $216 |
| Canada Party | Bill Martens | 44 | 0.08 | $140 |
| Total valid votes | | 52,318 | 100.00 | |
| Total rejected ballots | | 214 | | |
| Turnout | | 52,532 | 72.35 | |
| Electors on lists | | 72,611 | | |
Source: Thirty-fifth General Election, 1993: Official Voting Results, Published by the Chief Electoral Officer of Canada. Financial figures taken from official contributions and expenses provided by Elections Canada.

1990 Manitoba general election: Osborne
| Party | Candidate | Votes | % |
|---|---|---|---|
| Liberal | Reg Alcock | 3,941 | 40.21 |
| New Democratic | Donald Bailey | 2,861 | 29.19 |
| Progressive Conservative | Sondra Braid | 2,859 | 29.17 |
| Libertarian | Jim Weidman | 139 | 1.42 |
| Total valid votes | | 9,800 | 100.00 |
| Rejected ballots | | 41 | |
| Turnout | | 9,841 | 71.64 |
| Registered voters | | 13,737 | |

1988 Manitoba general election: Osborne
| Party | Candidate | Votes | % | ±% |
|---|---|---|---|---|
| Liberal | Reg Alcock | 4,334 | 44.90 | |
| New Democratic | Muriel Smith | 2,753 | 28.52 | |
| Progressive Conservative | Rosemary Vodrey | 2,421 | 25.08 | |
| Libertarian | Clancy Smith | 145 | 1.50 | |
| Turnout | | 9,691 | 78.85 | |
| Liberal gain | | Swing | | |
Source: Elections Manitoba

All electoral information is taken from Elections Canada and Elections Manitoba. Italicized expenditures refer to submitted totals, and are presented when the final reviewed totals are not available.

== Footnotes ==
27th Canadian Ministry (2003–2006) – Cabinet of Paul Martin
Cabinet post (1)
| Predecessor | Office | Successor |
|---|---|---|
| Lucienne Robillard | President of the Treasury Board; 2003–2006 | John Baird |
Special Cabinet Responsibilities
| Predecessor | Title | Successor |
| Ralph Goodale | Minister responsible for the Canadian Wheat Board; 2003–2006 | Chuck Strahl |
Parliament of Canada
| Preceded by Dorothy Dobbie | Member of Parliament for Winnipeg South; 1993–2006 | Succeeded by Rod Bruinooge |
Legislative Assembly of Manitoba
| Preceded by Muriel Smith | Member of the Manitoba Legislature for Osborne; 1988–1993 | Succeeded by Norma McCormick |
