= Osborne (electoral district) =

Defunct provincial electoral district in Manitoba, Canada

Osborne is a former provincial electoral district of Manitoba, Canada. It was created by redistribution in 1957, and was abolished in 1999.

The riding was located in south-central Winnipeg. When it was abolished, most of its territory was given to the new ridings of Fort Rouge and Lord Roberts.

== Members of the Legislative Assembly ==
Name	Party	Took office	Left office
Lloyd Stinson	Co-operative Commonwealth	1958	1959
Obie Baizley	Progressive Conservative	1959	1969
Ian Turnbull	New Democrat	1969	1977
Gerald Mercier	Progressive Conservative	1977	1981
Muriel Smith	New Democrat	1981	1988
Reg Alcock	Liberal	1988	1993
Norma McCormick	Liberal	1993	1995
Diane McGifford	New Democrat	1995	1999

== Election results ==
1988 Manitoba general election
Party	Candidate	Votes	%	±%
Liberal	Reg Alcock	4,334	44.90	+
New Democratic	Muriel Smith	2,753	28.52	-
Progressive Conservative	Rosemary Vodrey	2,421	25.08	+
Libertarian	Jim Weidman	145	1.50	+
Total valid votes		9,653	100.00	-
Rejected ballots		38	–	–
Turnout		9,691	78.85	
Eligible voters		12,291		
Source: Elections Manitoba

1990 Manitoba general election
Party	Candidate	Votes	%	±%
Liberal	Reg Alcock	3,941	40.21	-4.69
New Democratic	Donald Bailey	2,861	29.19	+0.67
Progressive Conservative	Sondra Braid	2,859	29.17	+4.09
Libertarian	Jim Weidman	139	1.42	-0.08
Total valid votes		9,800	100.00	-
Rejected ballots		41	–	
Turnout		9,841	71.64	
Eligible voters		13,737		
Source: Elections Manitoba

Manitoba provincial by-election, September 21, 1993 Resignation of Reg Alcock
Party	Candidate	Votes	%	±%
Liberal	Norma McCormick	2,966	43.10	+2.89
New Democratic	Irene Haigh	2,420	35.16	+5.97
Progressive Conservative	Roger Young	1,496	21.74	-7.43
Turnout				
Liberal hold		Swing		-1.54
Source: Elections Manitoba

1995 Manitoba general election
Party	Candidate	Votes	%	±%
New Democratic	Diane McGifford	3,969	40.86	+5.7
Liberal	Norma McCormick	2,978	30.66	-12.44
Progressive Conservative	Shelley Mitchell	2,766	28.48	+6.74
Turnout		7,226	67.72	
Eligible voters		10,670		
New Democratic gain from Liberal		Swing		+9.07
Source: Elections Manitoba

== See also ==
- List of Manitoba provincial electoral districts
- Canadian provincial electoral districts
