= Winnipeg South =

Federal electoral district in Manitoba, Canada

Coordinates: 49.786°N 97.128°W

Manitoba electoral district
- Interactive map of riding boundaries from the 2025 federal election

Federal electoral district
- Legislature: House of Commons
MP
Terry Duguid
Liberal
- District created: 1987
- First contested: 1988
- Last contested: 2025
- District webpage: profile, map

Demographics
- Population (2011): 85,540
- Electors (2015): 62,156
- Area (km²): 105
- Pop. density (per km²): 814.7
- Census division: Winnipeg
- Census subdivision: Winnipeg (part)

Winnipeg South (French: Winnipeg-Sud) is a Canadian federal electoral district in Manitoba, Canada, that has been represented in the House of Commons of Canada from 1917 to 1979, and since 1988. It covers the southernmost part of the city of Winnipeg.

The riding is a bellwether, electing an MP from the party that formed government nationally in every election since it was re-formed in 1988. In its earlier incarnation, it only elected opposition MPs three times, in 1925, 1953, and 1965.

== History ==
The electoral district was created in 1914 from parts of the ridings of Winnipeg, Provencher, and Macdonald. It first elected a Member of Parliament in 1917.

In 1976, it was abolished when it was redistributed into the ridings of Winnipeg—Assiniboine and Winnipeg—Fort Garry, which took effect at the election of 1979.

In 1987, it was re-created from parts of Winnipeg—Assiniboine and Winnipeg—Fort Garry, which were abolished, and has been contested since 1988.

Some observers expected Winnipeg South to be a close race in 2011, though these predictions were later proven wrong. This race was close in 2006, when Conservative challenger Rod Bruinooge defeated four-term Liberal incumbent Reg Alcock by just 111 votes. In 2008, Bruinooge improved his plurality to nearly 6,000 votes. His Liberal challenger was businessperson, party activist, and former Winnipeg City Council member Terry Duguid.

This riding lost territory to Winnipeg South Centre and Saint Boniface—Saint Vital, and gained territory from the latter, during the 2012 electoral redistribution. Bruinooge chose not to contest the 2015 election, and Duguid won the seat for the Liberal Party.

Following the 2022 Canadian federal electoral redistribution, the riding will lose the neighbourhood of Minnetonka to St. Boniface—St. Vital and the neighbourhoods of Whyte Ridge and Linden Ridge to Winnipeg South Centre. These changes will come into effect upon the calling of the 2025 Canadian federal election.

=== Members of Parliament ===
This riding has elected the following members of the House of Commons:

Parliament	Years	Member	Party
Winnipeg South; Riding created from Macdonald, Provencher and Winnipeg
13th	1917–1921	George William Allan Jr	Government (Unionist)
14th	1921–1925	Albert Hudson	Liberal
15th	1925–1926	Robert Rogers	Conservative
16th	1926–1930	John Stewart McDiarmid	Liberal
17th	1930–1935	Robert Rogers	Conservative
18th	1935–1940	Leslie Mutch	Liberal
19th	1940–1945	Leslie Mutch	Liberal
20th	1945–1949	Leslie Mutch	Liberal
21st	1949–1953	Leslie Mutch	Liberal
22nd	1953–1956	Owen Trainor	Progressive Conservative
23rd	1957–1958	Gordon Chown	Progressive Conservative
24th	1958–1962	Gordon Chown	Progressive Conservative
25th	1962–1963	Gordon Chown	Progressive Conservative
26th	1963–1965	Margaret Konantz	Liberal
27th	1965–1968	Bud Sherman	Progressive Conservative
28th	1968–1972	James Armstrong Richardson	Liberal
29th	1972–1974	James Armstrong Richardson	Liberal
30th	1974–1978	James Armstrong Richardson	Liberal
30th	1978–1979	James Armstrong Richardson	Independent
Riding dissolved into Winnipeg—Assiniboine and Winnipeg—Fort Garry
Riding re-created from Winnipeg—Assiniboine and Winnipeg—Fort Garry
34th	1988–1993	Dorothy Dobbie	Progressive Conservative
35th	1993–1997	Reg Alcock	Liberal
36th	1997–2000	Reg Alcock	Liberal
37th	2000–2004	Reg Alcock	Liberal
38th	2004–2006	Reg Alcock	Liberal
39th	2006–2008	Rod Bruinooge	Conservative
40th	2008–2011	Rod Bruinooge	Conservative
41st	2011–2015	Rod Bruinooge	Conservative
42nd	2015–2019	Terry Duguid	Liberal
43rd	2019–2021	Terry Duguid	Liberal
44th	2021–2025	Terry Duguid	Liberal
45th	2025–present	Terry Duguid	Liberal

=== Current member of Parliament ===
Terry Duguid has represented Winnipeg South since the 2015 election. He was re-elected in 2019, 2021, and 2025.

== Demographics ==
Panethnic groups in Winnipeg South (2011−2021)
Panethnic group	2021		2016		2011	
Panethnic group	Pop.	%	Pop.	%	Pop.	%
European (Note: Statistic includes all persons that did not make up part of a visible minority or an indigenous identity.)	53,420	47.59%	55,645	56.69%	57,055	67.82%
South Asian	16,365	14.58%	10,055	10.24%	6,030	7.17%
East Asian (Note: Statistic includes total responses of "Chinese", "Korean", and "Japanese" under visible minority section on census.)	14,665	13.07%	11,495	11.71%	6,655	7.91%
African	8,645	7.7%	5,725	5.83%	3,090	3.67%
Indigenous	7,430	6.62%	6,770	6.9%	5,345	6.35%
Southeast Asian (Note: Statistic includes total responses of "Filipino" and "Southeast Asian" under visible minority section on census.)	5,115	4.56%	3,630	3.7%	2,660	3.16%
Middle Eastern (Note: Statistic includes total responses of "West Asian" and "Arab" under visible minority section on census.)	3,520	3.14%	2,450	2.5%	1,335	1.59%
Latin American	1,240	1.1%	840	0.86%	975	1.16%
Other/multiracial (Note: Statistic includes total responses of "Visible minority, n.i.e." and "Multiple visible minorities" under visible minority section on census.)	1,845	1.64%	1,555	1.58%	980	1.16%
Total responses	112,245	99.01%	98,160	98.48%	84,125	98.35%
Total population	113,370	100%	99,678	100%	85,540	100%
Notes: Totals greater than 100% due to multiple origin responses. Demographics based on 2012 Canadian federal electoral redistribution riding boundaries.

According to the 2021 Canadian census

- Twenty most common ethnic origins (2021) : 12.7% English, 11.7% Chinese, 11.1% Scottish, 9.0% German, 8.9% Ukrainian, 8.7% French, 8.6% Irish, 7.1% Indian (India), 6.7% Canadian, 4.4% Polish, 3.9% Métis, 3.6% Filipino, 2.6% Dutch, 2.3% Italian, 2.3% Russian, 2.1% Pakistani, 2.1% Punjabi, 2.0% Mennonite, 1.9% British Isles, 1.7% Icelandic.
- India, China, Nigeria, Philippines, and Pakistan are the most common places of birth amongst the 43.6% that is foreign-born.
- 43.3% of Winnipeg South is Christian, while 7.9% are Muslims, and 35.8% have no religion.
- Those without Canadian citizenship make up 23.8% of Winnipeg South.

== Election results ==
=== 1988–present ===
Graph of election results in Winnipeg South (since 1988, minor parties that never got 2% of the vote or did not run consistently are omitted) View source data.

2025 Canadian federal election
Party	Candidate	Votes	%	±%	Expenditures
Liberal	Terry Duguid	27,287	58.78	+10.63	
Conservative	Janice Morley-Lecomte	16,315	35.14	+2.44	
New Democratic	Joanne Bjornson	2,093	4.51	–9.83	
People's	Johann Rempel Fehr	427	0.92	–2.42	
Green	Manjit Kaur	301	0.65	–0.83	
Total valid votes/expense limit					
Total rejected ballots					
Turnout		46,423	72.23		
Eligible voters		64,271			
Liberal notional hold		Swing		+4.10	
Source: Elections Canada

2021 federal election redistributed results
Party	Vote	%
Liberal	19,251	48.15
Conservative	13,074	32.70
New Democratic	5,733	14.34
People's	1,336	3.34
Green	590	1.48

2021 Canadian federal election
Party	Candidate	Votes	%	±%	Expenditures
Liberal	Terry Duguid	22,423	47.46	+5.32	$101,968.67
Conservative	Melanie Maher	15,967	33.79	-4.92	$70,925.37
New Democratic	Aiden Kahanovitch	6,632	14.03	+0.09	$0.00
People's	Byron Curtis Gryba	1,542	3.26	+2.36	$4,177.84
Green	Greg Boettcher	681	1.44	-2.88	$436.79
Total valid votes/expense limit		47,245	–	–	$106,465.61
Total rejected ballots		346			
Turnout		47,591	67.65		
Eligible voters		69,825			
Source: Elections Canada

2019 Canadian federal election
Party	Candidate	Votes	%	±%	Expenditures
Liberal	Terry Duguid	20,182	42.14	-16.15	$82,362.08
Conservative	Melanie Maher	18,537	38.71	+4.04	$102,498.79
New Democratic	Jean-Paul Lapointe	6,678	13.94	+8.95	$41.24
Green	Paul Bettess	2,073	4.32	+2.27	$6,744.38
People's	Mirwais Nasiri	419	0.9	+0.9	$3,076.22
Total valid votes/expense limit		47,889	100.0		
Total rejected ballots		303	0.63	–	
Turnout		48,192	69.92		
Eligible voters		68,922			
Liberal hold		Swing		-10.10	
Source: Elections Canada

2015 Canadian federal election
Party	Candidate	Votes	%	±%	Expenditures
Liberal	Terry Duguid	28,096	58.29	+26.30	$131,358.55
Conservative	Gordon Giesbrecht	16,709	34.67	-17.07	$130,109.13
New Democratic	Brianne Goertzen	2,404	4.99	-9.15	$2,235.01
Green	Adam Smith	990	2.05	-0.08	$837.96
Total valid votes/expense limit		48,199	100.00		$198,589.24
Total rejected ballots		203	0.42	–	
Turnout		48,402	75.87	–	
Eligible voters		63,798			
Liberal gain from Conservative		Swing		+21.68	
Source: Elections Canada

2011 federal election redistributed results
Party	Vote	%
Conservative	20,509	51.73
Liberal	12,684	32.00
New Democratic	5,604	14.14
Green	846	2.13

2011 Canadian federal election
Party	Candidate	Votes	%	±%	Expenditures
Conservative	Rod Bruinooge	22,840	52.24	+3.41	$74,282.37
Liberal	Terry Duguid	14,296	32.70	-2.10	$65,648.93
New Democratic	Dave Gaudreau	5,693	13.02	+1.59	$8,116.60
Green	Caitlin McIntyre	889	2.03	-2.47	$564.35
Total valid votes/expense limit		43,718	100.00		–
Total rejected ballots		187	0.43	-0.01	
Turnout		43,905	69.80	+4.17	
Eligible voters		62,902	–	–	

2008 Canadian federal election
Party	Candidate	Votes	%	±%	Expenditures
Conservative	Rod Bruinooge	19,954	48.83	+7.42	$74,312
Liberal	John Loewen	14,221	34.80	-6.35	$73,677
New Democratic	Sean Robert	4,673	11.43	-2.29	$9,507
Green	David Cosby	1,839	4.50	+1.42	$3,312
Christian Heritage	Heidi Loewen-Steffano	173	0.42	-0.19	$804
Total valid votes/expense limit		40,860	100.00		$78,463
Total rejected ballots		179	0.44	+0.1	
Turnout		41,039	65.63	-3.78	
Conservative hold		Swing		+6.9	

2006 Canadian federal election
Party	Candidate	Votes	%	Expenditures
Conservative	Rod Bruinooge	17,328	41.42	$68,461.08
Liberal	Reg Alcock	17,217	41.15	$57,453.38
New Democratic	Robert Page	5,743	13.73	$1,973.24
Green	Wesley Owen Whiteside	1,289	3.08	–
Christian Heritage	Heidi Loewen-Steffano	259	0.62	$503.33
Total valid votes		41,836	100.00	
Total rejected ballots		111		
Turnout		41,947	70.39	
Electors on the lists		59,594		
Sources: Official Results, Elections Canada and Financial Returns, Elections Canada.

2004 Canadian federal election
Party	Candidate	Votes	%	Expenditures
Liberal	Reg Alcock	19,270	51.31	$63,885.73
Conservative	Rod Bruinooge	12,770	34.00	$67,207.73
New Democratic	Catherine Green	4,217	11.23	$6,919.66
Green	Ron Cameron	1,003	2.67	$702.79
Christian Heritage	Jane MacDiarmid	296	0.79	$4,202.05
Total valid votes		37,556	100.00	
Total rejected ballots		110		
Turnout		37,666	63.23	
Electors on the lists		59,572		
Percentage change figures are factored for redistribution. Conservative Party percentages are contrasted with the combined Canadian Alliance and Progressive Conservative percentages from 2000.
Sources: Official Results, Elections Canada and Financial Returns, Elections Canada.

2000 Canadian federal election
Party	Candidate	Votes	%	Expenditures
Liberal	Reg Alcock	21,433	50.94	$61,348.98
Alliance	Bill Hancock	12,638	30.04	$32,684.49
New Democratic	Duane Nicol	4,224	10.04	$2,006.24
Progressive Conservative	Geoffrey Lambert	3,599	8.55	$4,149.75
Independent	Didz Zuzens	183	0.43	$355.12
Total valid votes		42,077	100.00	
Total rejected ballots		145		
Turnout		42,222	66.43	
Electors on the lists		63,562		
Sources: Official Results, Elections Canada and Financial Returns, Elections Canada.

1997 Canadian federal election
Party	Candidate	Votes	%	Expenditures
Liberal	Reg Alcock	18,800	49.57	$53,378
Reform	Greg Yost	7,510	19.80	$35,545
Progressive Conservative	Bill Mackness	6,547	17.26	$38,748
New Democratic	Iris Taylor	4,629	12.21	$3,062
Rhinoceros	M. Rhino Olito	191	0.50	$0
Natural Law	Larry Decter	153	0.40	$582
Marxist–Leninist	Diane Zack	94	0.25	$11
Total valid votes		37,924	100.00	
Total rejected ballots		252		
Turnout		38,176	67.37	
Electors on the lists		56,670		
Sources: Official Results, Elections Canada and Financial Returns, Elections Canada.

1993 Canadian federal election
Party	Candidate	Votes	%	Expenditures
Liberal	Reg Alcock	25,950	49.60	$39,157
Reform	Mark Hughes	14,822	28.33	$49,384
Progressive Conservative	Dorothy Dobbie	6,432	12.29	$23,095
National	Shirley Loewen	2,512	4.80	$21,347
New Democratic	Rose Buss	2,180	4.17	$424
Natural Law	Richard Lepinsky	197	0.38	$231
Rhinoceros	Mike Olito	113	0.22	$728
Marxist–Leninist	Rubin Kantorovich	68	0.13	$216
Canada Party	Bill Martens	44	0.08	$140
Total valid votes		52,318	100.00	
Total rejected ballots		214		
Turnout		52,532	72.35	
Electors on lists		72,611		
Source: Thirty-fifth General Election, 1993: Official Voting Results, Published by the Chief Electoral Officer of Canada. Financial figures taken from official contributions and expenses provided by Elections Canada.

1988 Canadian federal election
Party	Candidate	Votes	%
Progressive Conservative	Dorothy Dobbie	22,865	45.9
Liberal	Allan Kaufman	22,150	44.5
New Democratic	Len Van Roon	3,151	6.3
Reform	Gary Cummings	1,428	2.9
Libertarian	Jim Weidman	168	0.3
Total valid votes		49,762	100.0

=== 1917–1979 ===
Graph of election results in Winnipeg South (1917-1974, minor parties that never got 2% of the vote or did not run consistently are omitted) View source data.

Location of Winnipeg South within Winnipeg between the 1966 and 1976 representation orders

1974 Canadian federal election
Party	Candidate	Votes	%	±%
Liberal	James Armstrong Richardson	23,297	45.9	-5.0
Progressive Conservative	Sterling Lyon	22,031	43.4	+9.5
New Democratic	Jill Oliver	5,016	9.9	-4.9
Social Credit	William Frank Zemianski	141	0.3	
Independent	Ross F. Clancy Smith	86	0.2	
Marxist–Leninist	Glen A. Brown	80	0.2	
Communist	Harold James Dyck	79	0.2	
Total valid votes		50,730	100.0	

1972 Canadian federal election
Party	Candidate	Votes	%	±%
Liberal	James Armstrong Richardson	25,534	50.9	-2.2
Progressive Conservative	Boyd Robertson	17,022	33.9	-0.5
New Democratic	James Gilbert Burrows	7,413	14.8	+2.3
Independent	Diane Lynne Waldman	205	0.4	
Total valid votes		50,174	100.0	

1968 Canadian federal election
Party	Candidate	Votes	%	±%
Liberal	James Armstrong Richardson	23,457	53.1	+15.6
Progressive Conservative	Bud Sherman	15,209	34.4	-8.9
New Democratic	William John Hutton	5,499	12.5	-6.6
Total valid votes		44,165	100.0	

Location of Winnipeg South within Winnipeg between the 1952 and 1966 representation orders

1965 Canadian federal election
Party	Candidate	Votes	%	±%
Progressive Conservative	Bud Sherman	23,576	43.4	+3.7
Liberal	Margaret Konantz	20,396	37.5	-6.0
New Democratic	Sidney Green	10,371	19.1	+5.1
Total valid votes		54,343	100.0	

1963 Canadian federal election
Party	Candidate	Votes	%	±%
Liberal	Margaret Konantz	24,467	43.6	+3.2
Progressive Conservative	Gordon Chown	22,316	39.7	-1.4
New Democratic	Lloyd Stinson	7,867	14.0	-1.1
Social Credit	James C. MacPherson	1,515	2.7	-0.8
Total valid votes		56,165	100.0	

1962 Canadian federal election
Party	Candidate	Votes	%	±%
Progressive Conservative	Gordon Chown	21,743	41.1	-22.1
Liberal	Margaret Konantz	21,351	40.3	+15.9
New Democratic	Sidney Green	7,993	15.1	+2.8
Social Credit	James C. MacPherson	1,834	3.5	
Total valid votes		52,921	100.0	

Note: NDP vote is compared to CCF vote in 1958 election.

1958 Canadian federal election
Party	Candidate	Votes	%	±%
Progressive Conservative	Gordon Chown	32,308	63.2	+11.3
Liberal	Charlie Avery	12,524	24.5	-3.1
Co-operative Commonwealth	Fred Paulley	6,305	12.3	-3.1
Total valid votes		51,137	100.0	

1957 Canadian federal election
Party	Candidate	Votes	%	±%
Progressive Conservative	Gordon Chown	23,855	51.8	+12.0
Liberal	Edward H. Crawford	12,713	27.6	-11.2
Co-operative Commonwealth	David A. Mulligan	7,112	15.5	-4.3
Social Credit	Gordon Charles Smith	2,332	5.1	
Total valid votes		46,012	100.0	

Location of Winnipeg South within Winnipeg between the 1947 and 1952 representation orders

1953 Canadian federal election
Party	Candidate	Votes	%	±%
Progressive Conservative	Owen C. Trainor	12,597	39.9	+10.6
Liberal	Charles Russell Simonite	12,277	38.9	-9.0
Co-operative Commonwealth	Ernest R. Draffin	6,247	19.8	-3.1
Labor–Progressive	Martin Joseph Forkin	470	1.5	
Total valid votes		31,591	100.0	

1949 Canadian federal election
Party	Candidate	Votes	%	±%
Liberal	Leslie Alexander Mutch	16,235	47.8	+8.8
Progressive Conservative	Gunnar Solmundur Thorvaldson	9,942	29.3	-2.1
Co-operative Commonwealth	Frederick George Tipping	7,765	22.9	-6.7
Total valid votes		33,942	100.0	

Location of Winnipeg South within Winnipeg between the 1933 and 1947 representation orders

1945 Canadian federal election
Party	Candidate	Votes	%	±%
Liberal	Leslie Alexander Mutch	11,921	39.0	-16.5
Progressive Conservative	Frederick George Thompson	9,589	31.4	+1.0
Co-operative Commonwealth	Frederick George Tipping	9,033	29.6	+15.5
Total valid votes		30,543	100.0	

Note: Progressive Conservative vote is compared to "National Government" vote in 1940 election.

1940 Canadian federal election
Party	Candidate	Votes	%	±%
Liberal	Leslie Alexander Mutch	15,461	55.6	+11.6
National Government	Phipps Baker	8,445	30.4	+1.4
Co-operative Commonwealth	Dave Mulligan	3,912	14.1	-0.9
Total valid votes		27,818	100.0	

Note: "National Government" vote is compared to Conservative vote in 1935 election.

1935 Canadian federal election
Party	Candidate	Votes	%	±%
Liberal	Leslie Alexander Mutch	10,871	43.9	-4.6
Conservative	Edwin Godfrey Phipps Baker	7,158	28.9	-21.3
Co-operative Commonwealth	William Campbell	3,690	14.9	
Reconstruction	Robert Alexander Gillespie	2,216	9.0	
Social Credit	Percy Black Hayward	800	3.2	
Total valid votes		24,735	100.0	

Location of Winnipeg South within Winnipeg between the 1924 and 1933 representation orders

1930 Canadian federal election
Party	Candidate	Votes	%	±%
Conservative	Robert Rogers	10,117	50.2	+3.8
Liberal	John Stewart McDiarmid	9,774	48.5	-5.0
Independent Labour	Charles Albert Tanner	256	1.3	
Total valid votes		20,147	100.0	

1926 Canadian federal election
Party	Candidate	Votes	%	±%
Liberal	John Stewart McDiarmid	8,809	53.6	+19.0
Conservative	Robert Rogers	7,638	46.4	+1.5
Total valid votes		16,447	100.0	

1925 Canadian federal election
Party	Candidate	Votes	%	±%
Conservative	Robert Rogers	7,017	44.9	+5.3
Liberal	Tobias Crawford Norris	5,400	34.6	-25.8
Labour	John Kelly	3,206	20.5	
Total valid votes		15,623	100.0	

Location of Winnipeg South within Winnipeg between the 1914 and 1924 representation orders

1921 Canadian federal election
Party	Candidate	Votes	%	±%
Liberal	Albert Hudson	10,570	54.3	+42.6
Conservative	George Nelson Jackson	7,704	39.6	-48.7
Liberal	William Robert Hogarth	1,185	6.1	
Total valid votes		19,459	100.0	

Note: Conservative vote is compared to Government vote in 1917 election. Liberal vote is compared to Opposition vote in 1917 election.

1917 Canadian federal election
Party	Candidate	Votes	%
Government (Unionist)	George William Allan	19,031	88.3
Opposition (Laurier Liberals)	Neil Thomas MacMillan	2,516	11.7
Total valid votes		21,547	100.0

== See also ==
- List of Canadian electoral districts
- Historical federal electoral districts of Canada
