= List of members of the Canadian House of Commons with military service (L) =

Name	Elected party	Constituency	Elected date	Military service
Sévérin Lachapelle	Conservative	Hochelaga	October 21, 1892	Papal Army (1868-1870)
Léo La Flèche	Liberal	Outremont	November 30, 1942	Canadian Army (1914-1919)
Marcel Joseph Aimé Lambert	Progressive Conservative	Edmonton West	June 10, 1957	Canadian Army (1941-1945)
J. Gilles Lamontagne	Liberal	Langelier	May 24, 1977	Royal Canadian Air Force (1941-1945)
Auguste-C.P.R. Landry	Conservative	Montmagny	September 17, 1878	Militia
Bob Lane	Progressive Conservative	Winnipeg—St. James	May 22, 1979	Royal Canadian Navy (1946-1949)
Norman Lang	Unionist	Humboldt	December 17, 1917	Canadian Army
Léopold Langlois	Liberal	Gaspé	June 11, 1945	Royal Canadian Navy (1940-1945)
Gérald Laniel	Liberal	Beauharnois—Salaberry	June 18, 1962	Royal Canadian Air Force (1942-1958)
Arthur-Joseph Lapointe	Liberal	Matapédia—Matane	October 14, 1935	Canadian Army
Hugues Lapointe	Liberal	Lotbinière	March 26, 1940	Canadian Army
A.A.C. Larivière	Conservative	Provencher	January 24, 1889	Militia (1871-)
Fred Larson	Liberal	Kindersley	June 27, 1949	Royal Canadian Air Force
John Wimburne Laurie	Conservative	Shelburne	December 15, 1887	British Army (1853-)
Armand Lavergne	Liberal	Montmagny	February 16, 1904	Militia
Allan Frederick Lawrence	Progressive Conservative	Northumberland—Durham	October 30, 1972	Royal Canadian Navy
Harry Leader	Progressive	Portage la Prairie	December 6, 1921	Canadian Army
Jean-Louis Leduc	Liberal	Richelieu	May 22, 1979	Canadian Army (1940-1941)
Carl Legault	Liberal	Nipissing	June 22, 1964	Royal Canadian Air Force (1943-1945)
Joseph-Hormidas Legris	Liberal	Maskinongé	March 5, 1891	Militia
Pierre Lemieux	Conservative	Glengarry—Prescott—Russell	January 23, 2006	Canadian Forces
Thomas Herbert Lennox	Conservative	York North	October 29, 1925	Canadian Army
Jean Lesage	Liberal	Montmagny—L'Islet	June 11, 1945	Canadian Army (1933-1945)
William Lesick	Progressive Conservative	Edmonton East	September 4, 1984	Canadian Army
William Carruthers Little	Liberal-Conservative	Simcoe South	September 20, 1867	Royal Navy (1839-1844)
