= Woodsworth =

Woodsworth may refer to:

- Ellen Woodsworth
- J. S. Woodsworth
- James Woodsworth
- Judith Woodsworth
- Woodsworth College, Toronto
