= Salem Bland =

Canadian Methodist theologian and activist (1859–1950)

The Reverend Salem Bland
- 1925 painting of Bland by Lawren Harris
- Born: Salem Goldworth Bland; 25 August 1859; Lachute, Quebec, Canada
- Died: 7 February 1950 (aged 90); Toronto, Ontario, Canada
- Political party: Co-operative Commonwealth Federation
- Spouse: Emma Levell (m. 1926)
- Parents: Emma Bland; Henry Flesher Bland

Ecclesiastical career
- Religion: Christianity (Methodist)
- Church: Methodist Church; United Church of Canada
- Ordained: 1884

Academic background
- Education: Morrin College
- Influences: Sir John William Dawson; Henry George; George Monro Grant; Benjamin Kidd; Albrecht Ritschl; William Morley Punshon; Herbert Spencer; John Watson

Academic work
- Discipline: History; theology
- Sub-discipline: Ecclesiastical history
- School or tradition: Christian socialism; Social Gospel
- Institutions: Wesley College
- Notable works: The New Christianity (1920)
- Influenced: William Irvine; William Ivens; A. E. Smith; J. S. Woodsworth

Salem Goldworth Bland (1859–1950) was a Canadian Methodist theologian, Georgist, and one of Canada's most important Social Gospel thinkers.

== Biography ==
He was born on 25 August 1859 in Lachute, Quebec, the son of Emma Bland and Henry Flesher Bland, a Methodist preacher. As a child he lost the use of one of his legs, likely due to polio. He had the useless leg amputated at age thirty and replaced it with an artificial limb. He obtained a Bachelor of Arts degree at Morrin College in 1877, and later studied at McGill University. He was ordained a Methodist minister in 1884 and served as a preacher in a series of churches in Ontario and Quebec. In 1903, he accepted a position at Wesley College in Winnipeg, Manitoba, as Professor of Church History and New Testament Exegesis.

Originally a relatively conservative Methodist, at Wesley he embraced higher criticism. It was also in Winnipeg that he became committed to activist Christianity and the Social Gospel movement. He became a popular guest preacher across western Canada. At Wesley he tutored a number of students including J. S. Woodsworth, William Irvine, and William Ivens who became early leaders of the social-democratic Co-operative Commonwealth Federation. Bland, a longtime advocate for the creation of a third party alternative to the Liberals and Conservatives, helped found the Ontario CCF.

Bland also became a regular writer for The Grain Growers' Guide, then the main organ of the progressive farmers' movement, from 1917 to 1919. This activism led him into conflict with the leaders of Wesley College and he was dismissed in 1917 after a long battle with principal Eber Crummy.

Bland moved to Toronto in 1919 where he became the minister at the Broadway Methodist Tabernacle, one of the largest Methodist churches in the city and one serving the large working-class community of western Toronto. He remained there until 1923, when he moved to the smaller Western Methodist Church. He became a prominent figure in the new United Church of Canada. In 1935, he convinced the general assembly to pass a motion condemning capitalism. He also led the campaign in favour of the ordination of women and succeeded in 1936.

He also remained deeply involved in social activism. He was a supporter of the Republican side in the Spanish Civil War and a leader of the Canadian Committee to Aid Spanish Democracy. Firmly anti-war, he refused to encourage Canadians to enlist in the Republican cause. Rather he focused on raising humanitarian aid for those affected by the conflict. Most notably the committee supported a home for some 100 war orphans in Barcelona that was named Salem Bland Home. He became close friends with the exiled American activist Emma Goldman, and when she died in Toronto in 1940 it was Bland who delivered the eulogy at her funeral. He also wrote a column for the Toronto Star called "The Observer" from 1924 to 1950. A well-known figure in Toronto, he had his portrait painted by the Group of Seven artist Lawren S. Harris in 1926. The painting is today in the collection of the Art Gallery of Ontario.

Bland died in Toronto on 7 February 1950 and was buried at Mount Pleasant Cemetery.

== Works ==
- The New Christianity, or the Religion of the New Age. Toronto: McClelland & Stewart, 1920.
- James Henderson, D.D. Toronto: McClelland & Stewart, 1926.
