= Winnipeg Centre (disambiguation) =

Winnipeg Centre or Winnipeg Center may refer to:

- Winnipeg Centre (federal riding)
- Winnipeg Centre (provincial electoral division)
- Downtown Winnipeg
- Winnipeg North Centre
- Winnipeg South Centre
- Winnipeg Area Control Centre (CZWG), see Nav Canada
