= Cyril Keeper =

Canadian politician (born 1943)

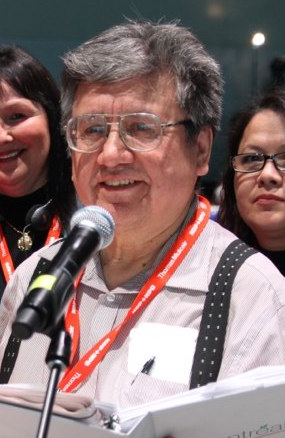

Member of Parliament for Winnipeg North Centre
- In office 1984–1988
- Preceded by: Stanley Knowles
- Succeeded by: David Walker

Member of Parliament for Winnipeg—St. James
- In office 1980–1984
- Preceded by: Bob Lane
- Succeeded by: George Minaker

Winnipeg City Councillor
- In office 1977–unknown
- Preceded by: Robert Steen
- Constituency: unknown

Personal details
- Born: July 17, 1943 (age 83) Berens River, Manitoba, Canada
- Party: New Democratic Party
- Education: University of Winnipeg; Carleton University

Cyril Keeper (born July 17, 1943) is a politician in Manitoba, Canada. He was a member of the House of Commons of Canada from 1980 to 1988, serving as a member of the New Democratic Party.

== Life ==
Keeper was born in Berens River, Manitoba. He is an aboriginal Canadian, of Métis background. He holds a Bachelor of Arts degree from the University of Winnipeg and a Master of Arts degree from Carleton University. He worked for the government of Manitoba from 1970 to 1975 and was director of the Native Family Life Counselling Program in Winnipeg from 1975 to 1977.

Keeper was elected to the Winnipeg City Council in 1977, defeating incumbent councillor Robert Steen (ironically, Steen was elected Mayor of Winnipeg on the same night). He served on council for just over two years, before moving to federal politics.

Keeper was first elected to the House of Commons in the 1980 federal election, narrowly defeating incumbent Progressive Conservative Bob Lane in Winnipeg—St. James. The Liberal Party won a majority government under Pierre Trudeau, and Keeper entered the House of Commons as an opposition member. Originally appointed as NDP critic for urban affairs and public works, he attained greater recognition in a later role as critic for manpower, the Unemployment Insurance Commission, and the Public Service Commission. Throughout 1982 and 1983, he made frequent calls for the Trudeau government to place a greater focus on Canada's worsening unemployment situation.

Keeper left Winnipeg—St. James to seek the NDP nomination for Winnipeg North Centre in the 1984 federal election, under somewhat controversial circumstances. It was generally assumed that Winnipeg—St. James would become more favourable to the Progressive Conservative Party after redistribution; Winnipeg North Centre, by contrast, was one of the safest NDP seats in the country. Keeper's candidacy was said to have annoyed other New Democrats, who wanted to recruit a star candidate for the seat. Keeper nonetheless won the nomination, and rejected charges that he moved from "a sure loser to a safe riding". He was re-elected without difficulty, as the Progressive Conservatives won a majority government.

Keeper served as his party's postal critic in the next parliament, and was a vocal opponent of Canada Post's plans to reduce rural mail delivery after 1986. He also announced his support for the Meech Lake Accord in 1987.

He lost to Liberal challenger David Walker in 1988. Two years later, he argued that many poor residents of his riding had been denied the right to vote because enumerators were reluctant to enter their neighbourhoods. However, he did not blame his defeat on flawed enumeration methods.

Keeper sought the NDP's Winnipeg North Centre nomination again for the 1993 federal election but lost to Maureen Hemphill. He campaigned for re-election to Winnipeg City Council in 1995 as a candidate of Winnipeg in the Nineties, but lost to incumbent councillor Amaro Silva in the Daniel McIntyre ward. He identified public safety as one of his main concerns.

In May 2005, Keeper, Jim Silver and Michael MacKenzie published a Canadian Centre for Policy Alternatives study addressing low turnout rates among aboriginal voters.
