= Darrell Rankin =

Canadian communist politician (born 1957)

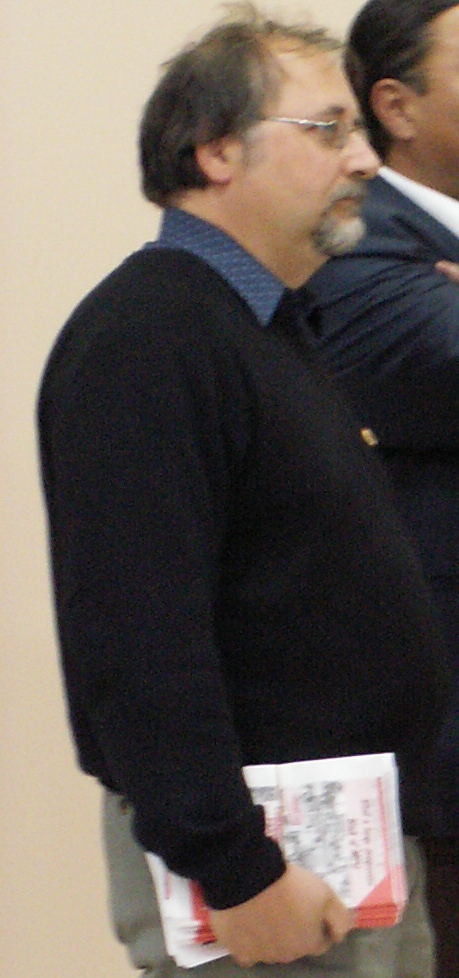
- Rankin in 2008

Leader of the Communist Party of Canada (Manitoba)
- In office 1996–2019
- Preceded by: Frank Goldspink
- Succeeded by: Frank Komarniski

Leader of the Communist Party of Canada (Ontario)
- Interim
- In office 1995–1995
- Preceded by: Elizabeth Rowley
- Succeeded by: Hassan Husseini

Personal details
- Born: February 14, 1957 (age 69) Edmonton, Alberta, Canada
- Party: Communist (1978–2019)
- Spouse: Cheryl-Anne Carr

Darrell T. Rankin (born February 14, 1957) is a Canadian peace activist and former communist politician. He was briefly the leader of the Communist Party of Canada (Ontario) in 1995, and formerly led the Communist Party of Canada (Manitoba) from 1996 to 2019. His partner, Cheryl-Anne Carr, was also active with the Communist Party. Rankin left the Communist Party in 2019.

== Early life and career ==
Rankin was born and raised in Edmonton, Alberta, and became involved in radical left politics through an early opposition to the Vietnam War. His grandparents were active in the Communist Party of Canada, which Rankin joined in 1978. He holds a Bachelor of Arts degree in political science from the University of Alberta.

He lived in Ottawa, Ontario, from 1983 to 1995, and was a leading figure in the Canadian Peace Alliance and the Ottawa Disarmament Coalition. A newspaper report from 1986 listed him as an articling lawyer, although it is not clear if he continued in this direction. He participated in protests against the Gulf War in 1991.

== CPC-Ontario leader ==
In 1992, a majority of delegates at the Communist Party's national convention voted to abandon Marxism-Leninism and pursue a social democratic alternative. Rankin was a part of the minority group led by Miguel Figueroa that opposed the change, and continued to support traditional communist principles. The party split, and the minority group won the rights to the Communist Party name through an out-of-court settlement.

Rankin was appointed as interim leader of the Communist Party of Canada (Ontario) in April 1995, and led the party in the 1995 provincial election. The national party had fallen to only 500 members in this period, and the Ontario party ran a low-profile campaign with only five candidates and an $8,000 budget. Rankin challenged New Democratic Party Premier Bob Rae in York South, and focused on issues such as health, education, social programs and full employment.

In June 1995, Rankin contributed an article entitled "Observations on the Setbacks to Socialism" to the Communist Party discussion journal The Spark! (not to be confused with the Trotskyist organization of the same name). The piece examined then-recent events in Eastern Europe, including the fall of the Soviet Union.

== CPC-Manitoba leader ==
Rankin moved to Winnipeg, Manitoba, in 1995 following the Ontario election. The Communist Party of Canada (Manitoba) had been without effective leadership for several years, and Rankin was chosen as the party's provincial organizer before the year was over. He coordinated the CPC-M's 75th anniversary banquet in early 1996, and was elected party leader later in the year. He subsequently led the party in the 1999, 2003 and 2007 provincial elections.

In January 2004, Rankin was challenged for the CPC-M leadership by Paul Sidon. He received 79 per cent of delegate support, against 21 per cent for Sidon.

Rankin is a founding member of Peace Alliance Winnipeg and a member of the No War Coalition (Manitoba). He helped organize protests against the 1999 Kosovo Conflict, the 2001 NATO invasion of Afghanistan and the 2003 invasion of Iraq. He wrote an article for the People's Voice, the newspaper of the Communist Party, supporting Slobodan Milošević's policies in Kosovo in order to protect Serbians from Albanians in the region whom Rankin labelled as "Fascists". He continued to write occasional articles for People's Voice. In November 2007, he organized a party at Winnipeg's Ukrainian Labour Temple to celebrate the 90th anniversary of the Russian Revolution.

Rankin has campaigned for public office several times, although he has never been elected. In March 2006, he was the leader of Communist Party of Canada's Peace and Disarmament Coalition. He is not related to Naomi Rankin, the leader of the Communist Party of Canada - Alberta. Rankin ran in Winnipeg Centre during the 2015 federal election.

== Electoral record ==
2015 Canadian federal election: Winnipeg Centre
| Party | Candidate | Votes | % | ±% | Expenditures |
|---|---|---|---|---|---|
| Liberal | Robert-Falcon Ouellette | 18,471 | 54.51 | +43.44 | $78,138.26 |
| New Democratic | Pat Martin | 9,490 | 28.01 | -25.65 | $104,378.44 |
| Conservative | Allie Szarkiewicz | 4,189 | 12.36 | -15.28 | $32,966.82 |
| Green | Don Woodstock | 1,379 | 4.07 | -2.98 | $38,782.49 |
| Christian Heritage | Scott Miller | 221 | 0.65 | – | $1,210.15 |
| Communist | Darrell Rankin | 135 | 0.40 | -0.19 | – |
| Total valid votes/expense limit | | 33,885 | 100.00 | | $192,170.62 |
| Total rejected ballots | | 281 | 0.82 | – | |
| Turnout | | 34,166 | 61.41 | – | |
| Eligible voters | | 55,633 | | | |
| Liberal gain from New Democratic | | Swing | | +34.59 | |
Source: Elections Canada

2007 Manitoba general election: Point Douglas
| Party | Candidate | Votes | % | ±% | Expenditures |
|---|---|---|---|---|---|
| New Democratic | George Hickes | 2,665 | 66.36 | −8.50 | $12,892.59 |
| Liberal | Mary Lou Bourgeois | 591 | 14.72 | +0.48 | $11,443.44 |
| Progressive Conservative | Alexa Rosentreter | 481 | 11.98 | +3.21 | $1,180.30 |
| Green | Kristen Andrews | 213 | 5.30 | – | $84.55 |
| Communist | Darrell Rankin | 66 | 1.64 | −0.49 | $373.89 |
| Total valid votes | | 4,016 | 100.00 | | |
| Rejected and declined ballots | | 29 | 0.72 | -0.69 | |
| Turnout | | 4,045 | 40.14 | −0.10 | |
| Electors on the lists | | 10,077 | | | |
| New Democratic hold | | Swing | | -4.49 | |

2006 Canadian federal election: Winnipeg North
| Party | Candidate | Votes | % | ±% | Expenditures |
|---|---|---|---|---|---|
| New Democratic | Judy Wasylycia-Leis | 15,582 | 57.18 | +9.02 | $53,357.55 |
| Liberal | Parmjeet Gill | 5,752 | 21.11 | −15.44 | $64,979.49 |
| Conservative | Garreth McDonald | 4,810 | 17.65 | +5.38 | $5,321.33 |
| Green | David Carey | 779 | 2.86 | +0.82 | $397.50 |
| Christian Heritage | Eric Truijen | 207 | 0.76 | +0.22 | |
| Communist | Darrell Rankin | 123 | 0.45 | +0.02 | $295.28 |
| Total valid votes | | 27,253 | 100.00 | | |
| Rejected ballots | | 137 | | | |
| Turnout | | 27,390 | 50.91 | +3.78 | |
| Electors on the lists | | 53,805 | | | |
Sources: Official Results, Elections Canada and Financial Returns, Elections Canada.

2004 Canadian federal election: Winnipeg North
| Party | Candidate | Votes | % | ±% | Expenditures |
|---|---|---|---|---|---|
| New Democratic | Judy Wasylycia-Leis | 12,507 | 48.16 | +1.53 | $34,948.23 |
| Liberal | Rey Pagtakhan | 9,491 | 36.55 | +0.04 | $61,961.93 |
| Conservative | Kris Stevenson | 3,186 | 12.27 | −2.56 | $9,148.61 |
| Green | Alon Weinberg | 531 | 2.04 | | $2,287.45 |
| Christian Heritage | Eric Truijen | 141 | 0.54 | | $1,000.00 |
| Communist | Darrell Rankin | 111 | 0.43 | | $654.58 |
| Total valid votes | | 25,967 | 100.00 | | |
| Rejected ballots | | 128 | | | |
| Turnout | | 26,095 | 47.13 | | |
| Electors on the lists | | 55,372 | | | |
Percentage change figures are factored for redistribution. Conservative Party percentages are contrasted with the combined Canadian Alliance and Progressive Conservative percentages from 2000.
Sources: Official Results, Elections Canada and Financial Returns, Elections Canada.

2003 Manitoba general election: Point Douglas
| Party | Candidate | Votes | % | ±% | Expenditures |
|---|---|---|---|---|---|
| New Democratic | George Hickes | 2,877 | 74.86 | +21.52 | $10,189.54 |
| Liberal | Mary Lou Bourgeois | 547 | 14.23 | −7.12 | $7,991.06 |
| Progressive Conservative | Wyatt McIntyre | 337 | 8.77 | −10.79 | $10.68 |
| Communist | Darrell Rankin | 82 | 2.13 | | $376.06 |
| Total valid votes | | 3,843 | 100.00 | | |
| Rejected and declined ballots | | 55 | 1.41 | +0.48 | |
| Turnout | | 3,898 | 40.24 | −18.84 | |
| Electors on the lists | | 9,687 | | | |
| New Democratic hold | | Swing | | +14.32 | |

2000 Canadian federal election: Winnipeg North Centre
| Party | Candidate | Votes | % | Expenditures |
|---|---|---|---|---|
| New Democratic | Judy Wasylycia-Leis | 14,356 | 58.39 | $54,041.14 |
| Liberal | Mary Richard | 6,755 | 27.47 | $48,194.97 |
| Progressive Conservative | Myron Troniak | 2,950 | 12.00 | $4,320.59 |
| Communist | Darrell Rankin | 525 | 2.14 | $263.77 |
| Total valid votes | | 24,586 | 100.00 | |
| Rejected ballots | | 481 | | |
| Turnout | | 25,067 | 51.95 | |
| Electors on the lists | | 48,254 | | |
Sources: Official Results, Elections Canada and Financial Returns, Elections Canada.

1999 Manitoba general election: Burrows
| Party | Candidate | Votes | % | ±% | Expenditures |
|---|---|---|---|---|---|
| New Democratic | Doug Martindale | 5,151 | 66.34 | -1.13 | $21,056.00 |
| Liberal | Mike Babinsky | 1,849 | 23.81 | 9.26 | $24,553.70 |
| Progressive Conservative | Cheryl Clark | 724 | 9.32 | -8.66 | $11,879.28 |
| Communist | Darrell Rankin | 41 | 0.53 | – | $0.00 |
| Total valid votes | | 7,765 | – | – | |
| Rejected | | 55 | – | | |
| Eligible voters / turnout | | 11,914 | 65.64 | 1.73 | |
Source(s) Source: Manitoba. Chief Electoral Officer (1999). Statement of Votes for the 37th Provincial General Election, September 21, 1999 (PDF) (Report). Winnipeg: Elections Manitoba.

1997 Canadian federal election: Winnipeg Centre
| Party | Candidate | Votes | % | Expenditures |
|---|---|---|---|---|
| New Democratic | Pat Martin | 10,979 | 40.89 | $48,662 |
| Liberal | David Walker | 9,895 | 36.86 | $47,283 |
| Reform | Reginald A. Smith | 3,095 | 11.53 | $3,175 |
| Progressive Conservative | Campbell Alexander | 2,442 | 9.10 | $6,171 |
| Independent | Greg Krawchuk | 148 | 0.55 | $163 |
| Marxist–Leninist | Glenn Michalchuk | 136 | 0.51 | $11 |
| Communist | Darrell Rankin | 108 | 0.40 | $1,913 |
| Libertarian | Didz Zuzens | 44 | 0.16 | $0 |
| Total valid votes | | 26,847 | 100.00 | |
| Rejected ballots | | 374 | | |
| Turnout | | 27,221 | 57.00 | |
| Electors on the lists | | 47,753 | | |
Sources: Official Results, Elections Canada and Financial Returns, Elections Canada.

1995 Ontario general election: York South
| Party | Candidate | Votes | % | Expenditures |
|---|---|---|---|---|
| New Democratic | Bob Rae | 10,442 | 41.24 | $39,100.07 |
| Progressive Conservative | Larry Edwards | 7,726 | 30.51 | $28,482.21 |
| Liberal | Hagood Hardy | 6,025 | 23.79 | $42,578.22 |
| Family Coalition | Don Pennell | 305 | 1.20 | $4,210.68 |
| Green | David James Cooper | 219 | 0.86 | $1,046.57 |
| Natural Law | Bob Hyman | 176 | 0.70 | $0.00 |
| Independent | Kevin Clarke | 170 | 0.67 | $1,164.66 |
| Libertarian | Roma Kelembet | 153 | 0.60 | $819.58 |
| Communist | Darrell Rankin | 105 | 0.41 | $59.00 |
| Total valid votes | | 25,321 | 100.00 | |
| Rejected, unmarked and declined ballots | | 388 | | |
| Turnout | | 25,709 | 69.13 | |
| Electors on the lists | | 37,192 | | |

1993 Canadian federal election: Calgary Southwest
| Party | Candidate | Votes | % | ±% | Expenditures |
|---|---|---|---|---|---|
| Reform | Preston Manning | 41,630 | 61.22 | +47.80 | $59,445 |
| Progressive Conservative | Bobbie Sparrow | 12,642 | 18.59 | –46.57 | $61,978 |
| Liberal | Bill Richards | 11,087 | 16.30 | +4.77 | $60,511 |
| New Democratic | Catherine Rose | 1,099 | 1.62 | –6.49 | $4,791 |
| National | Lea Russell | 910 | 1.34 | – | $2,580 |
| Green | Sol Candel | 301 | 0.44 | – | $6,216 |
| Natural Law | Ida Bugmann | 249 | 0.37 | – | none listed |
| Independent | Miel S.R. Gabriel | 57 | 0.08 | – | $218 |
| Communist | Darrell Rankin | 28 | 0.04 | – | $1,422 |
| Total valid votes | | 68,003 | 99.80 | | |
| Total rejected ballots | | 137 | 0.20 | +0.03 | |
| Turnout | | 68,140 | 70.82 | –9.62 | |
| Eligible voters | | 96,213 | | | |
| Reform gain from Progressive Conservative | | Swing | | +47.19 | |
Source: Elections Canada

All electoral information is taken from Elections Canada, Elections Ontario, and Elections Manitoba. Provincial election expenditures in Manitoba refer to individual candidate expenses. Italicized expenditures refer to submitted totals, and are presented when the final reviewed totals are not available.

== See also ==
- List of peace activists
