= David Walker (Canadian politician) =

Canadian politician (born 1947)

Member of Parliament for Winnipeg North Centre
- In office November 21, 1988 – June 2, 1997
- Preceded by: Cyril Keeper
- Succeeded by: Judy Wasylycia-Leis

Personal details
- Born: August 1, 1947 (age 78) Sudbury, Ontario, Canada
- Party: Liberal

David Walker (born August 1, 1947) is a Canadian politician. A member of the Liberal Party of Canada, he was first elected to the House of Commons of Canada in the 1988 Canadian federal election, serving as the member of Parliament (MP) for Winnipeg North Centre until 1997.

Walker was born in Sudbury, Ontario. He earned the following academic credentials: a Bachelor of Arts degree from Carleton University (1970), a Master of Arts from Queen's University (1974), and a Ph.D. from McMaster University (1976). He was a professor of political science at the University of Winnipeg in Manitoba from 1974 to 1988, and was also an adjunct professor at the University of Manitoba from 1977 to 1988. Walker was a partner in Walker-Zimmerman Consultants from 1978 to 1985, and served as president of West-Can Consultants Ltd. from 1978 to 1993. From 1985 to 1987, he was research director for the Angus Reid polling firm.

== Books ==
Walker is the author of Great Winnipeg Dream (1979), and the co-author of Livable Winter Cities (1986), Living Within Our Means: The Role of Voluntary Associations (1986) and Canadian Municipalities and Conditions of Fiscal Austerity in International Perspective (1987) and most recently his first novel Wild World. He chaired a Task Force of Native Employment in Manitoba in 1980, and a Via Rail task force in 1983–84.

== Political career ==
He campaigned for the Legislative Assembly of Manitoba in the 1977 provincial election, finishing second against former Progressive Conservative leader Sidney Spivak in the upscale constituency of River Heights. Walker worked as campaign manager to Liberal candidate Lloyd Axworthy in the 1979 and 1984 federal elections in Winnipeg—Fort Garry (Globe and Mail, 30 April 1979 and 24 August 1984), and worked as an adviser to Axworthy on Via Rail issues in the early 1980s (Globe and Mail, 10 January 1985).

He was elected to the Canadian House of Commons in the 1988 federal election, defeating New Democratic Party incumbent Cyril Keeper in Winnipeg North Centre. Walker was the first Liberal candidate ever to win this riding, as the democratic socialist Co-operative Commonwealth Federation and NDP had represented it for fifty-nine of the previous sixty-three years. The Progressive Conservative Party won a majority government in this election, and Walker served for the five years of the 34th Canadian Parliament as a member of the Official Opposition.

Walker was the co-leader of Paul Martin's bid to become Liberal Party leader in 1990 (Toronto Star, 3 June 1990). He also managed the Manitoba Liberal Party's campaign in the 1990 provincial election (Globe and Mail, 12 September 1990).

The Liberals won a majority government in the 1993 federal election, and Walker was re-elected with a convincing victory over former provincial cabinet minister Maureen Hemphill. He served as parliamentary secretary to Finance Minister Paul Martin from 1993 to 1996, when he became chairman of the standing committee on industry (Winnipeg Free Press, 5 March 1996). He was defeated in 1997, narrowly losing to NDP candidate Pat Martin when he ran in the re-established district of Winnipeg Centre.

Walker returned to his consulting business after leaving the House of Commons (Globe and Mail, 20 March 1999). He also worked on Paul Martin's second leadership bid in the early 2000s (National Post, 16 July 2001).

In 2000, he was appointed as chief federal negotiator for a Framework Agreement Initiative with the Assembly of Manitoba Chiefs concerning issues of aboriginal self-government.

== Electoral record ==
1997 Canadian federal election: Winnipeg Centre
Party	Candidate	Votes	%	Expenditures
New Democratic	Pat Martin	10,979	40.89	$48,662
Liberal	David Walker	9,895	36.86	$47,283
Reform	Reginald A. Smith	3,095	11.53	$3,175
Progressive Conservative	Campbell Alexander	2,442	9.10	$6,171
Independent	Greg Krawchuk	148	0.55	$163
Marxist–Leninist	Glenn Michalchuk	136	0.51	$11
Communist	Darrell Rankin	108	0.40	$1,913
Libertarian	Didz Zuzens	44	0.16	$0
Total valid votes		26,847	100.00	
Rejected ballots		374		
Turnout		27,221	57.00	
Electors on the lists		47,753		
Sources: Official Results, Elections Canada and Financial Returns, Elections Canada.
