= Bob Lane (Canadian politician) =

Canadian politician (1927–2025)

Member of the Canadian Parliament for Winnipeg—St. James
- In office May 22, 1979 – December 13, 1979
- Succeeded by: Cyril Keeper

Personal details
- Born: November 29, 1927 Winnipeg, Manitoba, Canada
- Died: January 13, 2025 (aged 97) Winnipeg, Manitoba, Canada
- Party: Progressive Conservative Party of Canada
- Spouse: Violet Cabel (m. 1950; died 2021)
- Profession: Insurance executive

Robert Edward Lane (November 29, 1927 – January 13, 2025) was a Canadian insurance executive and politician from Winnipeg, Manitoba. Lane served as a Progressive Conservative member of the House of Commons of Canada.

He represented the Winnipeg—St. James electoral district in Manitoba, which he won in the 1979 federal election. He did not serve in the cabinet led by Prime Minister Joe Clark. After serving his only term, the 31st Canadian Parliament, he was defeated in the 1980 federal election by Cyril Keeper of the New Democratic Party. Lane married Violet Cabel in November 1950, during which time he resided in Medicine Hat, Alberta. She died in 2021.
