= Winnipeg Centre =

Federal electoral district in Manitoba, Canada

Coordinates: 49.895°N 97.167°W

Manitoba electoral district
- Interactive map of riding boundaries from the 2025 federal election

Federal electoral district
- Legislature: House of Commons
MP
Leah Gazan
New Democratic
- District created: 1996
- First contested: 1997
- Last contested: 2025
- District webpage: profile, map

Demographics
- Population (2021): 87,499
- Electors (2015): 54,719
- Area (km²): 28.42
- Pop. density (per km²): 3,078.8
- Census division: Division No. 11
- Census subdivision: Winnipeg (part)

Winnipeg Centre (French: Winnipeg-Centre) is a federal electoral district in Manitoba, Canada, that has been represented in the House of Commons of Canada from 1917 to 1925 and since 1997.

== History ==
This riding was originally created in 1914 from Winnipeg and Selkirk ridings.

In 1924, it was abolished, and parts transferred to Winnipeg North Centre and Winnipeg South Centre ridings.

In 1997, it was re-created from Winnipeg North Centre and Winnipeg South Centre.

This riding was left unchanged after the 2012 electoral redistribution.

=== Historical boundaries ===
1914 representation order

1996 representation order

=== Members of Parliament ===
This riding has elected the following members of Parliament:

Parliament	Years	Member	Party
Winnipeg Centre; Riding created from Winnipeg and Selkirk
13th	1917–1921	George William Andrews	Government (Unionist)
14th	1921–1925	J.S. Woodsworth	Independent Labour
Riding dissolved into Winnipeg North Centre and Winnipeg South Centre
Riding re-created from Winnipeg North Centre, Winnipeg St. James, Winnipeg North and Winnipeg South Centre
36th	1997–2000	Pat Martin	New Democratic
37th	2000–2004	Pat Martin	New Democratic
38th	2004–2006	Pat Martin	New Democratic
39th	2006–2008	Pat Martin	New Democratic
40th	2008–2011	Pat Martin	New Democratic
41st	2011–2015	Pat Martin	New Democratic
42nd	2015–2019	Robert-Falcon Ouellette	Liberal
43rd	2019–2021	Leah Gazan	New Democratic
44th	2021–2025	Leah Gazan	New Democratic
45th	2025–present	Leah Gazan	New Democratic

== Demographics ==
Panethnic groups in Winnipeg Centre (2011−2021)
Panethnic group	2021		2016		2011	
Panethnic group	Pop.	%	Pop.	%	Pop.	%
European (Note: Statistic includes all persons that did not make up part of a visible minority or an indigenous identity.)	32,320	38.19%	34,365	41.66%	36,720	46.75%
Southeast Asian (Note: Statistic includes total responses of "Filipino" and "Southeast Asian" under visible minority section on census.)	18,855	22.28%	18,765	22.75%	17,555	22.35%
Indigenous	15,475	18.29%	15,265	18.51%	13,720	17.47%
African	8,340	9.86%	6,225	7.55%	4,110	5.23%
South Asian	3,600	4.25%	2,210	2.68%	1,425	1.81%
East Asian (Note: Statistic includes total responses of "Chinese", "Korean", and "Japanese" under visible minority section on census.)	1,935	2.29%	2,395	2.9%	2,560	3.26%
Middle Eastern (Note: Statistic includes total responses of "West Asian" and "Arab" under visible minority section on census.)	1,305	1.54%	905	1.1%	540	0.69%
Latin American	1,290	1.52%	840	1.02%	925	1.18%
Other/multiracial (Note: Statistic includes total responses of "Visible minority, n.i.e." and "Multiple visible minorities" under visible minority section on census.)	1,500	1.77%	1,495	1.81%	985	1.25%
Total responses	84,620	96.71%	82,480	95.96%	78,545	95.76%
Total population	87,499	100%	85,949	100%	82,026	100%
Notes: Totals greater than 100% due to multiple origin responses. Demographics based on 2012 Canadian federal electoral redistribution riding boundaries.

== Election results ==
=== 1997–present ===
Graph of election results in Winnipeg Centre (Since 1997, minor parties that never got 2% of the vote or didn't run consistently are omitted) View source data.

2025 Canadian federal election
Party	Candidate	Votes	%	±%	Expenditures
New Democratic	Leah Gazan	13,524	39.48	–10.17	
Liberal	Rahul Walia	12,108	35.34	+6.39	
Conservative	Tom Bambrick	7,658	22.35	+9.55	
Green	Gary Gervais	389	1.14	–1.25	
People's	Donald Grant	367	1.07	–3.21	
Animal Protection	Debra Wall	213	0.62	-0.05	
Total valid votes/expense limit					
Total rejected ballots					
Turnout		34,259	53.55		
Eligible voters		63,978			
New Democratic notional hold		Swing		–8.28	
Source: Elections Canada

2021 Canadian federal election
Party	Candidate	Votes	%	±%	Expenditures
New Democratic	Leah Gazan	14,962	50.29	+9.08	$95,075.71
Liberal	Paul Ong	8,446	28.39	-5.35	$34,450.58
Conservative	Sabrina Brenot	3,818	12.83	-4.70	none listed
People's	Bhavni Bhakoo	1,229	4.13	+2.64	$3,735.84
Green	Andrew Brown	708	2.38	-2.86	$0.00
Libertarian	Jamie Buhler	373	1.25	N/A	none listed
Animal Protection	Debra Wall	213	0.72	N/A	$4,055.48
Total valid votes/expense limit		29,749	98.8	–	$101,566.38
Total rejected ballots		365	1.2		
Turnout		30,114	52.2		
Eligible voters		57,672			
New Democratic hold		Swing		+7.22	
Source: Elections Canada

2021 federal election redistributed results
Party	Vote	%
New Democratic	15,726	49.65
Liberal	9,170	28.95
Conservative	4,055	12.80
People's	1,356	4.28
Green	756	2.39
Others	608	1.92

2019 Canadian federal election
Party	Candidate	Votes	%	±%	Expenditures
New Democratic	Leah Gazan	13,073	41.21	+13.20	$81,565.86
Liberal	Robert-Falcon Ouellette	10,704	33.74	-20.77	$93,870.93
Conservative	Ryan Dyck	5,561	17.53	+5.17	$16,427.27
Green	Andrea Shalay	1,661	5.24	+1.17	none listed
People's	Yogi Henderson	474	1.49	–	none listed
Christian Heritage	Stephanie Hein	251	0.79	+0.14	none listed
Total valid votes/expense limit		31,724	100.0		
Total rejected ballots		274			
Turnout		31,998	54.2		
Eligible voters		59,012			
New Democratic gain from Liberal		Swing		+16.99	
Source: Elections Canada

2015 Canadian federal election
Party	Candidate	Votes	%	±%	Expenditures
Liberal	Robert-Falcon Ouellette	18,471	54.51	+43.44	$78,138.26
New Democratic	Pat Martin	9,490	28.01	-25.65	$104,378.44
Conservative	Allie Szarkiewicz	4,189	12.36	-15.28	$32,966.82
Green	Don Woodstock	1,379	4.07	-2.98	$38,782.49
Christian Heritage	Scott Miller	221	0.65	–	$1,210.15
Communist	Darrell Rankin	135	0.40	-0.19	–
Total valid votes/expense limit		33,885	100.00		$192,170.62
Total rejected ballots		281	0.82	–	
Turnout		34,166	61.41	–	
Eligible voters		55,633			
Liberal gain from New Democratic		Swing		+34.59	
Source: Elections Canada

2011 Canadian federal election
Party	Candidate	Votes	%	±%	Expenditures
New Democratic	Pat Martin	13,928	53.66	+4.74	–
Conservative	Bev Pitura	7,173	27.64	+5.99	–
Liberal	Allan Wise	2,872	11.07	-4.55	–
Green	Jacqueline Romanow	1,830	7.05	-4.01	–
Communist	Darrell Rankin	152	0.59	+0.12	–
Total valid votes/expense limit		25,955	100.00		–
Total rejected ballots		248	0.95	+0.05	
Turnout		26,203	49.02	+6	
Eligible voters		53,452	–	–	

2008 Canadian federal election
Party	Candidate	Votes	%	±%	Expenditures
New Democratic	Pat Martin	12,285	48.92	+0.5	$42,608
Conservative	Kenny Daodu	5,437	21.65	+2.1	$20,177
Liberal	Daniel Hurley	3,922	15.62	-8.7	$37,980
Green	Jessie Klassen	2,777	11.06	+4.0	$2,733
Independent	Joe Chan	226	0.90	–	–
First Peoples National	Lyle Morrisseau	212	0.84	–	–
Independent	Ed Ackerman	135	0.54	–	–
Communist	Darrell Rankin	119	0.47	-0.2	–
Total valid votes/expense limit		25,113	100.00		$77,206
Total rejected ballots		227	0.90	+0.1	
Turnout		25,340	43	-6	

2006 Canadian federal election
Party	Candidate	Votes	%	±%	Expenditures
New Democratic	Pat Martin	13,805	48.4	+3.0	$58,778
Liberal	Ray St. Germain	6,940	24.3	-10.4	$27,375
Conservative	Helen Sterzer	5,554	19.5	+5.9	$37,740
Green	Gary Gervais	2,010	7.1	+2.8	$2,651
Communist	Anna-Celestrya Carr	199	0.7	+0.3	$295
Total valid votes		28,508	100.0		–
Total rejected ballots		231	0.8	+0.1	
Turnout		28,739	49	+4	

2004 Canadian federal election
Party	Candidate	Votes	%	±%	Expenditures
New Democratic	Pat Martin	12,149	45.4	+4.1	$51,914
Liberal	David Northcott	9,285	34.7	+0.6	$67,134
Conservative	Robert Eng	3,631	13.6	-8.0	$7,572
Green	Robin (Pilar) Faye	1,151	4.3	+1.7	$2,087
Marijuana	John M. Siedleski	346	1.3	–	–
Communist	Anna-Celestrya Carr	114	0.4	-0.1	$654
Independent	Douglas Edward Schweitzer	92	0.3	–	–
Total valid votes		26,768	100.0		–
Total rejected ballots		188	0.7		
Turnout		26,956	45.1		

Note: Conservative vote is compared to the total of the Canadian Alliance vote and Progressive Conservative vote in 2000 election.

2000 Canadian federal election
Party	Candidate	Votes	%	Expenditures
New Democratic	Pat Martin	11,263	41.26	$55,756.93
Liberal	Kevin Lamoureux	9,310	34.11	$55,979.28
Alliance	Reg Smith	3,975	14.56	$8,032.54
Progressive Conservative	Michel Allard	1,915	7.02	$1,460.02
Green	Mikel Magnusson	698	2.56	$1,572.64
Communist	Harold Dyck	134	0.49	$288.78
Total valid votes		27,295	100.00	
Total rejected ballots		236		
Turnout		27,531	52.56	
Electors on the lists		52,383		
Sources: Official Results, Elections Canada and Financial Returns, Elections Canada.

1997 Canadian federal election
Party	Candidate	Votes	%	Expenditures
New Democratic	Pat Martin	10,979	40.89	$48,662
Liberal	David Walker	9,895	36.86	$47,283
Reform	Reginald A. Smith	3,095	11.53	$3,175
Progressive Conservative	Campbell Alexander	2,442	9.10	$6,171
Independent	Greg Krawchuk	148	0.55	$163
Marxist–Leninist	Glenn Michalchuk	136	0.51	$11
Communist	Darrell Rankin	108	0.40	$1,913
Libertarian	Didz Zuzens	44	0.16	$0
Total valid votes		26,847	100.00	
Rejected ballots		374		
Turnout		27,221	57.00	
Electors on the lists		47,753		
Sources: Official Results, Elections Canada and Financial Returns, Elections Canada.

=== 1917–1925 ===
1921 Canadian federal election
Party	Candidate	Votes	%	±%
Labour	James Shaver Woodsworth	7,774	40.1	–
Conservative	Norman Kitson McIvor	4,034	20.8	-63.8
Liberal	John W. Wilton	4,032	20.8	+5.4
Independent	Harriet S. Dick	2,314	11.9	–
Independent	George William Andrews	1,220	6.3	–
Total valid votes		19,374	100.0	
Labour gain from Conservative		Swing		–
Note: Conservative vote is compared to Unionist vote in 1917 election.

1917 Canadian federal election
Party	Candidate	Votes	%
Government (Unionist)	George William Andrews	25,580	84.6
Opposition (Laurier Liberals)	Robert Sinclair Ward	4,650	15.4
Total valid votes		30,230	100.0

== See also ==
- List of Canadian electoral districts
- Historical federal electoral districts of Canada
