= Broadway Methodist Tabernacle =

Coordinates: 43.6583°N 79.3997°W

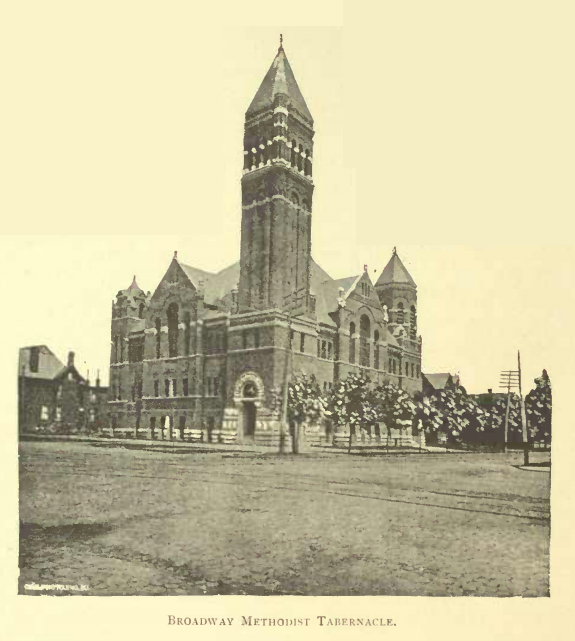
Broadway Methodist Tabernacle

Broadway Methodist Tabernacle was a prominent Methodist church in Toronto, Ontario, Canada, that existed from 1872 to 1924. The congregation was originally housed in a wood chapel at the intersection of Spadina Avenue and Dundas Street, which at that time was known as St. Patrick Street. It was originally named the Spadina Avenue Methodist Church. Rapid growth in the congregation saw it seek a new home, and in 1876 a larger lot was purchased at the northeast corner of Spadina and College Street. The wooden church was transported on rollers north to the new location. The old site eventually became the location of the Standard Theatre.

== History ==
In 1879 work began on a new brick church that would be able to seat 900. The church was also renamed Broadway Methodist Church, as at that time the wide stretch of Spadina from College to Bloor was often known as Broadway. That church also became too small, and in 1887 it was almost completely demolished and replaced by a third structure. This building was designed by E. J. Lennox, the most prominent architect then practicing in Toronto. At the request of the congregation he copied the basic floor plan and design of his earlier Bond Street Congregational Church, but at a larger scale. Rather than employing the neo-Gothic style, as he had with Bond Street, Lennox designed the church in the Romanesque Revival style. The building thus had many similarities in style of the City Hall that Lennox was working on simultaneously.

The new Tabernacle opened in 1889; near to the large working-class population of west Toronto and the textile mills of Spadina, it became an important social centre. This was especially true under the leadership of Salem Bland, one of the leading Social Gospel advocates in Canada, and who led the church from 1919 to 1923. However, the nature of the neighbourhood was changing. New immigrants from Southern and Eastern Europe, most notably a large Jewish population, were moving into the working-class area and the Methodist English were moving north to other neighbourhoods. The merger of churches that created the United Church of Canada in 1924 led to the eventual closing of the Tabernacle. The building was demolished by 1930, and replaced by the four storey office building that stands on the site today.
