= George William Andrews (Canadian politician) =

Canadian politician

Member of Parliament for Winnipeg Centre
- In office 1917–1921
- Preceded by: riding created from former Winnipeg and Selkirk ridings
- Succeeded by: J. S. Woodsworth

Personal details
- Born: September 9, 1869 Stanton Harcourt, Oxfordshire, England, UK
- Died: November 5, 1943 (aged 74)
- Party: Liberal
- Profession: real estate agent

George William Andrews (September 9, 1869 in Stanton Harcourt, Oxfordshire, England – November 5, 1943) was a Canadian politician and real estate agent. He served as Winnipeg MP from 1917 to 1921.

He was elected as a Liberal Unionist to the House of Commons of Canada in 1917 to represent the riding of Winnipeg Centre. He became an independent on June 2, 1919 when he withdrew from the Unionist government due to its handling of the Winnipeg General strike. He was defeated in the 1921 election.

During World War I, he served overseas as a major for the 90th Rifles.

== Electoral history ==
1921 Canadian federal election: Winnipeg Centre
Party	Candidate	Votes	%	±%
Labour	James Shaver Woodsworth	7,774	40.1	–
Conservative	Norman Kitson McIvor	4,034	20.8	-63.8
Liberal	John W. Wilton	4,032	20.8	+5.4
Independent	Harriet S. Dick	2,314	11.9	–
Independent	George William Andrews	1,220	6.3	–
Total valid votes		19,374	100.0	
Labour gain from Conservative		Swing		–
Note: Conservative vote is compared to Unionist vote in 1917 election.

1917 Canadian federal election: Winnipeg Centre
Party	Candidate	Votes	%
Government (Unionist)	George William Andrews	25,580	84.6
Opposition (Laurier Liberals)	Robert Sinclair Ward	4,650	15.4
Total valid votes		30,230	100.0
