= Stanley Knowles =

Canadian politician (1908–1997)

The Reverend and Honourable Stanley Knowles PC OC
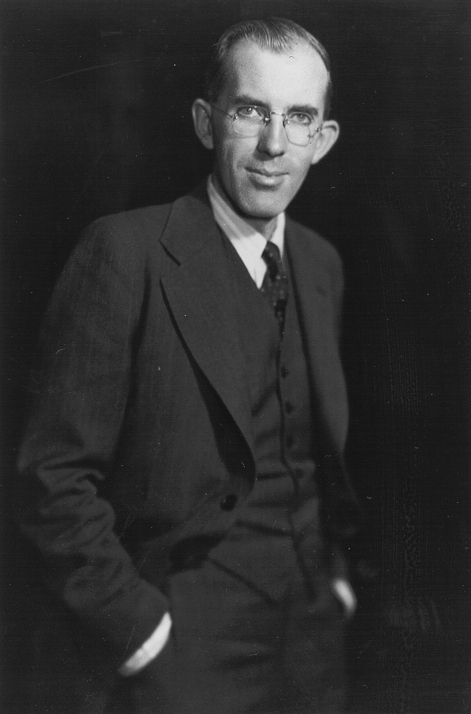
- Knowles in the 1940s

New Democratic Party House Leader
- In office 1962–1981
- Leader: Tommy Douglas; David Lewis; Ed Broadbent
- Succeeded by: Ian Deans

New Democratic Party Whip
- In office 1962–1972
- Leader: Tommy Douglas; David Lewis

Co-operative Commonwealth Federation Whip
- In office 1944–1958
- Leader: M. J. Coldwell; Hazen Argue
- Preceded by: Tommy Douglas
- Succeeded by: Tommy Douglas

Member of Parliament for Winnipeg North Centre
- In office June 18, 1962 – September 3, 1984
- Preceded by: John MacLean
- Succeeded by: Cyril Keeper
- In office November 30, 1942 – March 30, 1958
- Preceded by: J. S. Woodsworth
- Succeeded by: John MacLean

Executive Vice President of the Canadian Labour Congress
- In office 1958–1962 Serving with William Dodge
- President: Claude Jodoin
- Preceded by: Gordon G. Cushing
- Succeeded by: Joe Morris

Member of the Winnipeg City Council
- In office 1941–1942

Personal details
- Born: Stanley Howard Knowles; June 18, 1908 Los Angeles, California, U.S.
- Died: June 9, 1997 (aged 88) Ottawa, Ontario, Canada
- Party: New Democratic Party (1961–1997); Co-operative Commonwealth Federation (1935–1961)
- Spouse: Vida Claire Cruikshank (m. 1936; died 1978)
- Education: Brandon College; United College; University of Manitoba
- Profession: Clergyman

Stanley Howard Knowles PC OC (June 18, 1908 – June 9, 1997) was a Canadian parliamentarian. Knowles represented the riding of Winnipeg North Centre from 1942 to 1958 on behalf of the Co-operative Commonwealth Federation (CCF) and again from 1962 to 1984 representing the CCF's successor, the New Democratic Party (NDP).

Knowles was widely regarded and respected as the foremost expert on parliamentary procedure in Canada, and served as the CCF and NDP House Leader for decades. He was also a leading advocate of social justice, and was largely responsible for persuading the governments to increase Old Age Security benefits and for the introduction of the Canada Pension Plan, as well as other features of the welfare state.

== Early life and career ==
Born in Los Angeles, California, Knowles was the third child of Margaret (née Murdock) and Stanley Ernest Knowles of Canada. His father was a machinist from Nova Scotia and his mother was the daughter of a domestic servant from New Brunswick. The couple married in Nova Scotia and emigrated to the United States in 1904, four years before Stanley's birth. He visited relatives on the Canadian Prairie when he was 16 and decided to stay and enrolled at Brandon College in 1927. Knowles was brought up as a fundamentalist Methodist but was won over to the social gospel movement, and became a United Church minister after meeting J. S. Woodsworth at the annual conference of the Student Christian Movement of Canada, a fledgling ecumenical social justice movement founded in 1921. Knowles was ordained in 1933 after graduating from theological college.

== Political career ==
Knowles joined the CCF in 1934, during the Great Depression, and ran unsuccessfully for election to the House of Commons of Canada in the 1935 in Winnipeg South Centre and 1940 federal elections in Springfield and for the Legislative Assembly of Manitoba in the 1941 provincial election. He was first elected to the House of Commons in a 1942 by-election in Winnipeg North Centre that was held on the death of former CCF leader J. S. Woodsworth. He became an expert on parliamentary procedure, and used his skills to humiliate the Liberal government of Louis St. Laurent during the 1956 Pipeline Debate. This helped contribute to the government's electoral defeat in the 1957 election.

Progressive Conservative Party leader John Diefenbaker was so impressed by Knowles's skill that when he became prime minister as a result of that election, he asked Knowles to become Speaker of the House of Commons of Canada. Knowles declined. In 1958, Knowles was narrowly defeated by John MacLean, his Tory challenger in 1957, in an election that almost wiped out the CCF. His defeat in that election has been attributed both to the landslide victory won by Diefenbaker's Tories, and to the fact that Knowles spent much of the campaign travelling across Canada as a surrogate for ailing leader M.J. Coldwell rather than campaigning in his own riding. He subsequently went to work for the Canadian Labour Congress (CLC) as its executive vice-president, and worked with David Lewis to devise a strategy to create a new party that would bring the old CCF together with the labour movement by partnering the party with the CLC. This new party was launched as the New Democratic Party in 1961. Knowles ran as the new party's candidate for his old seat in the 1962 election, and won. He played a crucial role through minority governments of the 1960s and 1970s using the NDP's position holding the balance of power to persuade successive Liberal governments to introduce progressive measures.

Knowles was also known for his refusal to partake in many of the financial perks and entitlements available to a Member of Parliament. For the entirety of his career in politics, he boarded with the family of Susan Mann when in Ottawa rather than purchasing a residence of his own. Mann herself later published a biography of Knowles, Stanley Knowles: The Man from Winnipeg North Centre, in 1982.

In 1979, he became a member of the Queen's Privy Council for Canada on the advice of Prime Minister Joe Clark.

== Retirement ==
Knowles battled multiple sclerosis from 1946, but it was his 1981 stroke that ultimately removed him from public life. He retired from politics in 1984, but was given the unprecedented distinction of being made an honorary table officer of the House of Commons by Prime Minister Pierre Trudeau. This allowed him to spend his retirement viewing parliamentary debates from the floor of the House, and he was often seen to do so until further strokes left him bedridden.

In 1984, he was made an Officer of the Order of Canada. From 1970 to 1990, he was the chancellor of Brandon University, and today has the school's student union building named after himself and Tommy Douglas. He also has an elementary / junior high school in northwest Winnipeg named after him. He died in 1997.

== Electoral history ==
1935 Canadian federal election: Winnipeg South Centre
| Party | Candidate | Votes | % | ±% |
|---|---|---|---|---|
| Liberal | Ralph Maybank | 11,264 | 36.4 | −7.6 |
| Conservative | William Walker Kennedy | 9,382 | 30.3 | −25.7 |
| Co-operative Commonwealth | Stanley Knowles | 6,573 | 21.2 | |
| Reconstruction | Alfred James Susans | 2,642 | 8.5 | |
| Social Credit | Arthur Brown | 1,114 | 3.6 | |
| Total valid votes | | 30,975 | 100.0 | |

Canadian federal by-election, November 30, 1942: Winnipeg North Centre Death of J. S. Woodsworth
| Party | Candidate | Votes | % | ±% |
|---|---|---|---|---|
| Co-operative Commonwealth | Stanley Knowles | 11,639 | 70.21 | +29.68 |
| Liberal | Konrad Johannesson | 4,718 | 28.46 | -11.63 |
| Unknown | Cyril E. Rice | 220 | 1.33 | – |
| Valid votes cast | | 16,577 | | |
| Co-operative Commonwealth hold | | Swing | | +20.66 |

== Publications ==
- Knowles, Stanley (1957). "Some Thoughts on Parliamentary Procedure". Queen's Quarterly. 63 (4). Kingston: 525–527. ISSN 0033-6041.
- — (1959). "Business, Labour and Politics". In Greenslade, John Gareth (ed.). Canadian Politics: Speeches by F. M. Watkins, Stanley Knowles, J. R. Mallory and H. D. Hicks. Mount Allison University Publication. Vol. 4. Sackville | Mount Allison University Summer Institute conference: Mount Allison University.
- — (1961). The New Party. Toronto: McClelland & Stewart. OCLC 2187463.
- — (1965). How Parliament Works. Education Conference of the Ontario Federation of Labour, Niagara Falls, Ontario, February 13, 1965.

== Archives ==
There is a Stanley Knowles fonds at Library and Archives Canada. Archival reference number is R6931.

Parliament of Canada
| Preceded by John MacLean | Member of Parliament for Winnipeg North Centre; 1962–1984 | Succeeded by Cyril Keeper |
| Preceded by J. S. Woodsworth | Member of Parliament for Winnipeg North Centre; 1942–1958 | Succeeded by John MacLean |
Academic offices
| Preceded by Maitland Steinkopf | Chancellor of Brandon University; 1970–1990 | Succeeded by Ronald D. Bell |
