= Mary Kardash =

Canadian communist and feminist (1913–1994)

- Born: Mary Kostaniuk; 1913; Winnipeg, Canada
- Died: 1994 (aged 80–81)
- Political party: Communist Party of Canada
- Other political affiliations: Labor-Progressive Party
- Spouse: Bill Kardash (m. 1940)
- Children: 2

Mary Kardash (born Mary Kostaniuk; 1913 – 1994) was a Canadian communist and feminist activist.

== Biography ==
Kardash was born in Winnipeg and was of Ukrainian Canadian background. Her parents were both active in the Ukrainian Labour-Farmer Temple Association (ULFTA, a left-wing organization within the Ukrainian Canadian community) and her father was a communist organiser. Mary herself was active in the ULFTA's youth movement and worked as an organiser for the Young Communist League. She was active in the Communist Party's predecessor, the Labor-Progressive Party, before becoming "an important [Communist] Party worker in Manitoba". Kardash became secretary of the Winnipeg branch of the Canadian-Soviet Friendship Society. She travelled to Moscow in 1949 as part of the Canadian delegation from the Congress of Canadian Women to the Women's International Democratic Federation (WIDF), a post-war international for women's organizations from the Communist bloc.

As one of a group of long-lived Winnipeg communist municipal politicians, after several attempts, Kardash was first elected to the Winnipeg school board in 1960, and she served as a member intermittently until 1986, being elected as a Communist Party of Canada candidate. She supported radical reform and particularly programs to support aboriginal children, notably during a period of Conservative rule in Manitoba from the late 1970s. Her retirement from the school board in the late 1980s that ended several decades of Communist representation in Winnipeg.

Mary met her future husband, Bill Kardash, in 1939 and they married in March 1940, later having two children, Ted and Nancy. Bill was also a Communist leader and represented the party in the Legislative Assembly of Manitoba from 1941 until 1958. He was one of ten MLAs for the Winnipeg district until 1949 and subsequently one of four MLAs for Winnipeg North. Mary ran in north Winnipeg as a Communist candidate for the Legislative Assembly of Manitoba in the 1973 provincial election (in Burrows), and for the House of Commons of Canada in the 1974 federal election (in Winnipeg North Centre), but won under 200 votes in both attempts. In both cases the more moderate socialist provincial and federal New Democratic Party's candidates won.

In the 1980s, Mary Kardash courted controversy by questioning the generally accepted account of the 1932–33 Ukrainian famine and opposing a proposal that the history of the famine be included in the educational curriculum. The Communist Party acknowledged that many Ukrainians died by famine in the early 1930s, but they and she denied that Joseph Stalin's government was responsible for an act of genocide.

Mary and Bill Kardash resisted efforts to dissolve the Communist Party of Canada after the dissolution of the Soviet Union in 1991. Mary died in 1994. The St. Cross Child Care Centre of Winnipeg was renamed the Mary Kardash Child Care Centre in her honour in 1995.
