= John MacLean (Manitoba politician) =

Canadian politician

John Douglas Campbell MacLean

Member of Parliament for Winnipeg North Centre
- In office 31 March 1958 – 17 June 1962
- Preceded by: Stanley Knowles
- Succeeded by: Stanley Knowles

Personal details
- Born: 24 March 1929 Winnipeg, Manitoba, Canada
- Died: 9 November 1987 (aged 58) Yellowknife, Northwest Territories, Canada
- Party: Progressive Conservative
- Profession: Barrister

John Douglas Campbell MacLean (24 March 1929 - 9 November 1987) was a Progressive Conservative party member of the House of Commons of Canada. He was a barrister by career.

After an initial unsuccessful attempt in the 1957 federal election, MacLean was elected at the Winnipeg North Centre riding in the 1958 election. After serving his only term, the 24th Canadian Parliament, MacLean was defeated in the 1962 election.

Prior to his professional career in law and politics, MacLean was a hockey player for the Brandon Wheat Kings, including in the 1949 Memorial Cup, and later a coach and referee for teams in the Manitoba Junior Hockey League.
