= J. S. Woodsworth =

Canadian cleric, politician, and labour activist (1874–1942)

The Reverend J. S. Woodsworth
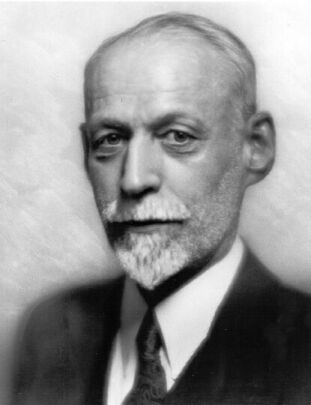

1st Leader of the Co-operative Commonwealth Federation
- In office August 1, 1932 – March 21, 1942
- Preceded by: new party
- Succeeded by: M. J. Coldwell

1st National Chairman of the Co-operative Commonwealth Federation
- In office 1932–1938
- Preceded by: new party
- Succeeded by: M. J. Coldwell

Member of Parliament
- In office October 29, 1925 – March 21, 1942
- Preceded by: new constituency
- Succeeded by: Stanley Knowles
- Constituency: Winnipeg North Centre
- In office December 6, 1921 – October 29, 1925
- Preceded by: George William Andrews
- Succeeded by: constituency abolished
- Constituency: Winnipeg Centre

Personal details
- Born: James Shaver Charleston Woodsworth; July 29, 1874 Etobicoke, Ontario, Canada
- Died: March 21, 1942 (aged 67) Vancouver, British Columbia, Canada
- Party: Labour Party (1921–1932); Co-operative Commonwealth Federation (1932–1942)
- Spouse: Lucy Staples (m. 1903)
- Children: Grace MacInnis
- Education: Victoria College, Toronto; University of Oxford
- Occupation: Politician; lecturer; social activist; teacher; author

James Shaver Charleston Woodsworth (July 29, 1874 – March 21, 1942) was a Canadian Methodist minister, politician, and labour activist. He was a pioneer of the Canadian Social Gospel, a Christian religious movement with social democratic values and links to organized labour. A long-time leader and publicist in the movement, Woodsworth served as a member of Parliament (MP) for Winnipeg Centre and Winnipeg North Centre from 1921 until his death in 1942. In 1932, he helped to found the Co-operative Commonwealth Federation (CCF), a socialist political party which was the predecessor to the New Democratic Party (NDP).

While studying at Oxford, he became interested in social welfare, and upon his return to Canada as a minister of the Methodist Church he preached the Social Gospel to the poor and the working classes of Manitoba. As the superintendent of the All People's Mission in Winnipeg and the secretary of the Canadian Welfare League, he focused on investigating social conditions, worked with immigrants, and campaigned for social welfare.

Woodsworth's focus on social issues and inequality led him to become active in the political labour movement in Canada. He led the protest campaign following the brutal police action which caused one person to be killed during the Winnipeg General Strike in 1919 and helped to organize the Manitoba Independent Labour Party (ILP). He ran and was elected to the House of Commons as a member of the ILP in 1921. In 1932 during the Great Depression, Woodsworth and the ILP along with other socialist and labour groups founded the Co-operative Commonwealth Federation (CCF), with Woodsworth as its leader. The CCF, Canada's first widely successful socialist party, evolved into today's New Democratic Party. Woodsworth influenced many of Canada's contemporary social programs including social assistance, pensions and medicare.

== Childhood and early ministry ==
The oldest of six children, Woodsworth was born on Applewood Farm in Etobicoke, Ontario, to Esther Josephine Shaver and James Woodsworth. His father was a Methodist minister, and his strong faith was a powerful factor in shaping his later life. His grandfather, Harold Richard Woodsworth, had opposed William Lyon Mackenzie in the 1837 Rebellions. The Woodsworth family moved to Brandon, Manitoba, in 1882, where his father became a Superintendent of Methodist Missions in western Canada. Following in his father's footsteps, Woodsworth was ordained as a Methodist minister in 1896 and spent two years as a circuit preacher in Manitoba before going to study at Victoria College in the University of Toronto and at Oxford University in England. While studying at Oxford University in 1899, he became interested in social welfare work. During his stay, the Second Boer War broke out, and Woodsworth was immersed in discussions about the moral values of imperialism. In 1902, following his return to Canada, he took a position as minister at Grace Church in Winnipeg, and, in 1903, he married Lucy Staples.

In this role, he worked with the poor immigrants in Winnipeg and preached the social gospel that called for the Kingdom of God "here and now" and was concerned with "... the welfare and behaviour of the individual in this world." It was not long, however, before Woodsworth became restless as a minister. He had difficulty accepting Methodist dogma, and questioned the wisdom of the Church's emphasis on individual salvation without considering the social context in which an individual lived. In a statement of explanation presented to the Manitoba Methodist Church Conference in 1907, he cited concerns with matters such as baptism, tests for those entering the Church, and fasting as a religious exercise. He tendered his resignation, but it was refused and he was offered the opportunity to assume the Superintendency of All People's Mission in Winnipeg's North End. For six years he worked with the poor and immigrant families, and during this time, he wrote and campaigned for compulsory education, juvenile courts, the construction of playgrounds, and other initiatives in support of social welfare.

== Social activism ==
As a mission worker, Woodsworth had the opportunity to see first hand the appalling circumstances in which many of his fellow citizens lived, and began writing the first of several books decrying the failure to provide workers with a living wage and arguing for the need to create a more egalitarian and compassionate social order.

In 1909, his Strangers Within Our Gates was published, followed in 1911 by My Neighbour. In Strangers Within Our Gates, Woodsworth elaborated on concerns related to immigration, and expressed sympathy for the difficulties new immigrants to Canada faced but also offered eugenic interpretations of human abilities and worth based on race. The organization of the book reflects Woodsworth's "hierarchy," with early chapters focusing on Great Britain, the United States, Scandinavians, Germans, and later chapters focusing on Italians, "Levantine races," and "Orientals," concluding with a chapter entitled "The Negro and the Indian."

In 1913, Woodsworth left All People's to accept an appointment as Secretary of the Canadian Welfare League. During this time, he travelled extensively throughout the three Canadian prairie provinces, investigating social conditions, and writing and speaking on his findings. By 1914, he had become a socialist and an admirer of the British Labour Party.

In 1916, during World War I, he was asked to support the National Services Registration, better known as conscription. As church ministers were being asked to preach about the duty of men to serve in the military, Woodsworth decided to publish his objections. As a pacifist, he was morally opposed to the Church being used as a vehicle of recruitment, and was fired from his position with the Bureau of Social Research, where he was working at the time. In 1917, he received his final pastoral posting to Gibson's Landing, British Columbia. Woodsworth resigned from the Church in 1918 because of its support of the war. "I thought that as a Christian minister, I was a messenger of the Prince of Peace", he is quoted as saying. His resignation was accepted.

== Political career ==
=== Political involvement in BC ===
Woodsworth and his family remained in British Columbia, where, despite his slight stature, he took work as a stevedore. He joined the International Longshore and Warehouse Union, helped organize the Federated Labour Party of British Columbia, and wrote for a labour newspaper.

=== Winnipeg General Strike ===
In 1919, he set out on a tour of Western Canada, arriving in Winnipeg just as the Winnipeg General Strike was happening. He immediately began presenting addresses at strike meetings.

The Royal Canadian Mounted Police and Winnipeg "special constables" charged into a crowd of strikers demonstrating in the centre of Winnipeg, killing two people and injuring 30, on Bloody Saturday, June 21, 1919. Woodsworth led the campaign of protest against this action.

The editor of the strike bulletin Western Labour News was arrested and charged with seditious libel. Woodsworth took over the duties and after just a week he too was arrested and charged with the same thing. Oddly, his seditious libel took the form of quoting from the Bible Isaiah 10:1 "Woe unto them that decree unrighteous decrees..." and from Isaiah 65:21,22 (KJV). He was released on bail after five days' imprisonment, and the charges were never filed. (Other strike leaders served a year's imprisonment for their activities.)

His involvement in the strike further established Woodsworth's credentials with the labour movement and propelled him to a twenty-year tenure in the House of Commons as a Winnipeg MP. They also affirmed his belief in the importance of social activism.

=== Political activism in BC, then in Winnipeg ===
Woodsworth briefly returned to British Columbia in 1920 to run as a Federated Labour Party candidate in Vancouver in the provincial election. He received 7444 votes but was not elected. He then returned to Winnipeg.

He became involved in organizing the Manitoba Independent Labour Party (ILP), a replacement for the locally based moderate Dominion Labour Party. The ILP had a platform modelled on that of the British Labour Party, with the slogan "Human Needs before Property Rights."

In December 1921, Woodsworth was elected to the House of Commons in the riding of Winnipeg Centre under the banner of the Independent Labour Party. This district was abolished before the next election, being rolled into the new Winnipeg North Centre. He served in the House of Commons for the next 20 years, until his death.

The first bill he proposed concerned unemployment insurance. Even though he was informed by the Clerk of the House of Commons that bills involving federal spending had to be presented by the government, he nonetheless continued to press his case for better labour legislation.

He also pursued constitutional reform but was unsuccessful in attempt to have Single Transferable Vote system adopted for federal elections. In 1936, the government set up a committee to discuss constitutional reforms (but the First-past-the-post voting system was not replaced).

Woodsworth was an unflagging advocate for the worker, the farmer, and the immigrant.

In 1929, Woodsworth was a keynote speaker at the annual conference of the Student Christian Movement of Canada, a fledgling social justice movement founded in 1921, and inspired Stanley Knowles, then 21, who later became ordained and helped found the New Democratic Party.

Rejecting violent revolution and any association with the new Communist Party of Canada, Woodsworth became a master of parliamentary procedure and used the House of Commons as a public platform. He at first sat beside the Progressive Party of Canada. He was a leader of the radical farmer-and-labour Ginger Group. This group's activities led to the 1932 founding of the first country-wide democratic socialist party, the CCF.

When the Canadian Liberal Party only had minority government following the 1925 election, Woodsworth bargained his vote in the House for a promise from the Liberal government to enact an old age pension plan. Introduced in 1927, the plan is the cornerstone of Canada's social security system.

In 1932, Woodsworth toured Europe as a member of the League of Nations Assembly in Geneva.

=== Formation of the CCF ===
After most of the world went into the Great Depression, Woodsworth and the ILP joined with various provincial farmer, labour and socialist groups in 1932 to found a new socialist party, the Co-operative Commonwealth Federation (CCF). Woodsworth was its first leader. Woodsworth said: "I am convinced that we may develop in Canada a distinctive type of Socialism. I refuse to follow slavishly the British model or the American model or the Russian model. We in Canada will solve our problems along our own lines."

In 1933, the CCF became the official opposition in British Columbia. In 1934, the party achieved the same result in Saskatchewan. One of its founding groups, the UFA, was government in Alberta.

In the 1935 election, seven CCF Members of Parliament were elected to the House of Commons. (None of the UFA MPs were re-elected.) The CCF received 8.9 percent of the popular vote. The CCF, however, was never able to seriously challenge Canada's party system, which was then dominated by the Liberals and Conservatives. In particular, the enormous prestige of the long-time Liberal Prime Minister, William Lyon Mackenzie King, prevented the CCF from displacing the Liberals as the main party of the left, as had happened with the socialist parties in Britain, Australia and New Zealand.

In 1939, the CCF was divided on the question of Canadian entry into World War II; the majority was in favour, but Woodsworth was against. During the debate on the declaration of war, Mackenzie King said: "There are few men in this Parliament for whom I have greater respect than the leader of the Co-operative Commonwealth Federation. I admire him in my heart, because time and again he has had the courage to say what lays on his conscience, regardless of what the world might think of him. A man of that calibre is an ornament to any Parliament."

I would ask, did the last war settle anything? I venture to say that it settled nothing; and the next war into which we are asked to enter, however big and bloody it may be, is not going to settle anything either. That is not the way in which settlements are brought about. While we are urged to fight for freedom and democracy, it should be remembered that war is the very negation of both. The victor may win; but if he does, it is by adopting the selfsame tactics which he condemns in his enemy. […]

I am among a considerable number in this country who believe, and we hold it as a mature conviction, that war is the inevitable outcome of the present economic and international system with its injustices, exploitations, and class interests. I suggest that the common people of the country gain nothing by slaughtering the common people of any other country. As one who has tried for a good many years to take a stand for the common people, personally I cannot give my consent to anything that will drag us into another war.

— J. S. Woodsworth, 8 September 1939

Nevertheless, Woodsworth was almost alone in his opposition to the war. He was the only Member of Parliament to vote against the bill, and his days as a party leader were, for all intents and purposes, over. Woodsworth was still widely popular and respected enough that no movement to formally remove him ever materialized, and he remained the party's official leader until his death, but fellow MP M.J. Coldwell largely assumed Woodsworth's duties as party leader.

He was re-elected to the House on 26 March 1940, but suffered a stroke in the fall and, over the next 18 months, his health deteriorated. He died in Vancouver, British Columbia in early 1942, and his ashes were scattered in the Strait of Georgia.

Woodsworth's daughter, Grace MacInnis, followed in his footsteps as a CCF politician.

== Woodsworth's legacy ==
Woodsworth strongly influenced Canadian social policy, and many of the social concepts he pioneered are represented in contemporary programs such as social assistance, pensions, and medicare, which are deemed to be fundamentally important in Canadian society today. While the party for which he was central founder, today called the New Democratic Party, has largely abandoned Woodsworth's vision of a socialist Canada, Woodsworth's memory is still held in great respect within the party as well as across Canada.

Woodsworth College of the University of Toronto, and J. S. Woodsworth Secondary School in Ottawa, Ontario (closed in 2005), are named after him. The 18-storey Woodsworth condominiums in downtown Toronto are named after him. Tredway Woodsworth Public School in Scarborough, Toronto is also named after him. In Winnipeg a chrome coloured sixteen-story Manitoba provincial office building built in 1973 is named after him, with a sculptured bronze bust honoring revealed in 1974 to honor his 100th birthday. The Ontario Woodsworth Memorial Foundation merged with the Douglas-Coldwell Foundation in 1987.

The Woodsworth home at 60 Maryland Street in Winnipeg, Manitoba, is now the location of the Centre for Christian Studies. CCS purchased Woodsworth House from the Woodsworth Historical Society in 1998, with a commitment to keep the Woodsworth name and to continue to display photographs of Woodsworth and reminders of his commitment to the social gospel and social justice.

In 2004, a CBC contest rated Woodsworth as the 100th Greatest Canadian of all time.

In October 2010, the town of Gibsons, British Columbia announced that it would be naming a street in a new subdivision after Woodsworth. Woodsworth lived in Gibsons for a short time, beginning in 1917. A Woodsworth street exists in Burnaby, but not in Gibsons.

== Electoral history ==
1921 Canadian federal election: Winnipeg Centre
Party	Candidate	Votes	%	±%
Labour	James Shaver Woodsworth	7,774	40.1	–
Conservative	Norman Kitson McIvor	4,034	20.8	-63.8
Liberal	John W. Wilton	4,032	20.8	+5.4
Independent	Harriet S. Dick	2,314	11.9	–
Independent	George William Andrews	1,220	6.3	–
Total valid votes		19,374	100.0	
Labour gain from Conservative		Swing		–
Note: Conservative vote is compared to Unionist vote in 1917 election.

1925 Canadian federal election: Winnipeg North Centre
Party	Candidate	Votes
Labour	J. S. Woodsworth	4,794
Conservative	Joseph Edwin Braid	3,578
Liberal	Edward Wesley Lowery	1,689

1926 Canadian federal election: Winnipeg North Centre
Party	Candidate	Votes
Labour	James Shaver Woodsworth	7,221
Conservative	Jose Alexander Banfield	4,220

1930 Canadian federal election: Winnipeg North Centre
Party	Candidate	Votes
Labour	James Shaver Woodsworth	8,265
Independent Conservative	Thomas Gargan	2,028
Communist	Martin Joseph Forkin	492
Source: lop.parl.ca

1935 Canadian federal election: Winnipeg North Centre
Party	Candidate	Votes
Co-operative Commonwealth	James Shaver Woodsworth	10,052
Liberal	H.P. Albert Hermanson	6,025
Conservative	Richard Randolph Pattinson	4,657
Reconstruction	Thomas William Kilshaw	2,490
Social Credit	Charles Wesley Huffman	1,035

1940 Canadian federal election: Winnipeg North Centre
Party	Candidate	Votes
Co-operative Commonwealth	J. S. Woodsworth	11,324
Liberal	Ambrose Roy McDonnell	11,199
National Government	Bjorn Stefansson	5,412

== Archives ==
There is a J.S. Woodsworth fonds at Library and Archives Canada. Archival reference number is R5904.
