= Winnipeg North Centre =

Former federal electoral district in Manitoba, Canada

Winnipeg North Centre was a federal electoral district in Manitoba, Canada, that was represented by a Member of Parliament (MP) in the House of Commons of Canada from 1925 to 2004. It is a largely working class riding in Winnipeg and has traditionally had a large Jewish and immigrant population.

The riding was created in 1924 and was first used for the 1925 federal election when it elected J.S. Woodsworth of the Independent Labour Party as its first MP. Woodsworth had previously represented Winnipeg Centre since the 1921 election. Woodsworth was re-elected there in 1926 and 1930. He held the seat for the party through the 1935 election and 1940 elections until his death in 1942. In 1932, Woodsworth helped found the Co-operative Commonwealth Federation (CCF) in 1932 and was named its first leader.

After Woodsworth's death in 1942, a by-election held that year was won by Stanley Knowles of the CCF. Knowles held the seat until the 1958 election that returned a landslide for John Diefenbaker's Progressive Conservative Party of Canada and elected Tory John MacLean in Winnipeg North Centre.

Out of parliament, Knowles went to work for the Canadian Labour Congress, and played a leading role in creating the alliance between the CLC and the CCF that led to the creation of the New Democratic Party (NDP) in 1961. Knowles won Winnipeg North Centre for the NDP in the 1962 election, and held the riding until his retirement in 1984.

In the 1984 election, the riding stayed in NDP hands with the election of Cyril Keeper. The NDP lost the riding in the 1988 election, however, when David Walker of the Liberal Party of Canada took the seat. Walker was re-elected in the 1993 election.

In the 1997 election, the NDP retook the riding (which since had its name changed to Winnipeg Centre) with Pat Martin becoming the MP. Martin retained the seat in the 2000 election.

The electoral district was abolished in 2003 when it was redistributed between Winnipeg North, Winnipeg Centre and Kildonan—St. Paul ridings.

Martin was re-elected to Parliament in Winnipeg Centre riding in the 2004 election.

This riding elected the following members of Parliament:

| Parliament | Years | Member | Party |
|---|---|---|---|
| 15th | 1925–1926 | J. S. Woodsworth | Independent Labour |
| 16th | 1926–1930 | J. S. Woodsworth | Independent Labour |
| 17th | 1930–1932 | J. S. Woodsworth | Independent Labour |
| 17th | 1932–1935 | J. S. Woodsworth | Co-operative Commonwealth |
| 18th | 1935–1940 | J. S. Woodsworth | Co-operative Commonwealth |
| 19th | 1940–1942 | J. S. Woodsworth | Co-operative Commonwealth |
| 19th | 1942–1945 | Stanley Knowles | Co-operative Commonwealth |
| 20th | 1945–1949 | Stanley Knowles | Co-operative Commonwealth |
| 21st | 1949–1953 | Stanley Knowles | Co-operative Commonwealth |
| 22nd | 1953–1957 | Stanley Knowles | Co-operative Commonwealth |
| 23rd | 1957–1958 | Stanley Knowles | Co-operative Commonwealth |
| 24th | 1958–1962 | John MacLean | Progressive Conservative |
| 25th | 1962–1963 | Stanley Knowles | New Democratic |
| 26th | 1963–1965 | Stanley Knowles | New Democratic |
| 27th | 1965–1968 | Stanley Knowles | New Democratic |
| 28th | 1968–1971 | Stanley Knowles | New Democratic |
| 29th | 1972–1974 | Stanley Knowles | New Democratic |
| 30th | 1974–1979 | Stanley Knowles | New Democratic |
| 31st | 1979–1980 | Stanley Knowles | New Democratic |
| 32nd | 1980–1984 | Stanley Knowles | New Democratic |
| 33rd | 1984–1988 | Cyril Keeper | New Democratic |
| 34th | 1988–1993 | David Walker | Liberal |
| 35th | 1993–1997 | David Walker | Liberal |
| 36th | 1997–2000 | Judy Wasylycia-Leis | New Democratic |
| 37th | 2000–2004 | Judy Wasylycia-Leis | New Democratic |

== Election results ==
2000 Canadian federal election
| Party | Candidate | Votes |
|---|---|---|
| New Democratic | Judy Wasylycia-Leis | 14,356 |
| Liberal | Mary Richard | 6,755 |
| Progressive Conservative | Myron Troniak | 2,950 |
| Communist | Darrell Rankin | 525 |

1997 Canadian federal election
| Party | Candidate | Votes |
|---|---|---|
| New Democratic | Judy Wasylycia-Leis | 13,663 |
| Liberal | Judy Silver | 7,801 |
| Reform | Mike Wiens | 3,678 |
| Progressive Conservative | Marni Larkin | 1,742 |
| Natural Law | Elizabeth Innes | 169 |
| Marxist–Leninist | Sharon Segal | 128 |

1993 Canadian federal election
| Party | Candidate | Votes |
|---|---|---|
| Liberal | David Walker | 13,308 |
| New Democratic | Maureen Hemphill | 8,506 |
| Reform | Reg Smith | 2,171 |
| Progressive Conservative | Leslie Zegalski | 1,219 |
| National | Gene Domine | 852 |
| Natural Law | Deborah Shelton | 171 |
| Independent | James Plewak | 113 |
| Canada Party | Cliff Besson | 89 |

1988 Canadian federal election
| Party | Candidate | Votes |
|---|---|---|
| Liberal | David Walker | 12,104 |
| New Democratic | Cyril Keeper | 10,580 |
| Progressive Conservative | Paul Taylor | 5,334 |
| Reform | Dennis Atamanchuk | 417 |
| Libertarian | John R. Talarico | 409 |
| Independent | William Hawryluk | 242 |
| Communist | Lorne Robson | 179 |
| Not affiliated | Glen Michalchuk | 97 |

1984 Canadian federal election
| Party | Candidate | Votes |
|---|---|---|
| New Democratic | Cyril Keeper | 10,559 |
| Progressive Conservative | Joe Du | 6,470 |
| Liberal | Frank Bueti | 5,144 |
| Independent | Monty A. McDonald | 484 |
| Independent | Don Hogan | 234 |

1980 Canadian federal election
| Party | Candidate | Votes |
|---|---|---|
| New Democratic | Stanley Knowles | 12,637 |
| Liberal | A.G.J. Harold Davis | 5,176 |
| Progressive Conservative | Joe Kerr | 4,113 |
| Communist | Paula Fletcher | 176 |
| Marxist–Leninist | Manjit Singh | 69 |

1979 Canadian federal election
| Party | Candidate | Votes |
|---|---|---|
| New Democratic | Stanley Knowles | 15,121 |
| Liberal | Frank Johnson | 5,428 |
| Progressive Conservative | Joe Kerr | 5,408 |
| Communist | Paula Fletcher | 182 |
| Marxist–Leninist | Marnie Frain | 97 |

1974 Canadian federal election
| Party | Candidate | Votes |
|---|---|---|
| New Democratic | Stanley Knowles | 12,023 |
| Progressive Conservative | Frank W. Crockett | 8,521 |
| Liberal | Alan Travers Sweatman | 5,883 |
| Social Credit | Ed Storozuk | 225 |
| Communist | Mary Kardash | 198 |
| Not affiliated | Murry Smith | 79 |
| Marxist–Leninist | Aili C. Waldman | 67 |

1972 Canadian federal election
| Party | Candidate | Votes |
|---|---|---|
| New Democratic | Stanley Knowles | 13,263 |
| Progressive Conservative | Frank W. Crockett | 7,050 |
| Liberal | Norman Frederick Turner | 6,984 |
| Social Credit | Don Hawryluk | 440 |
| Not affiliated | Don Currie | 186 |
| Not affiliated | Barry John Carlson | 134 |

1968 Canadian federal election
| Party | Candidate | Votes |
|---|---|---|
| New Democratic | Stanley Knowles | 14,880 |
| Liberal | Lloyd Axworthy | 11,323 |
| Progressive Conservative | Joe Kerr | 4,124 |

1965 Canadian federal election
| Party | Candidate | Votes |
|---|---|---|
| New Democratic | Stanley Knowles | 14,056 |
| Progressive Conservative | M.M. Wocks | 6,085 |
| Liberal | Leo Cholakis | 5,384 |

1963 Canadian federal election
| Party | Candidate | Votes |
|---|---|---|
| New Democratic | Stanley Knowles | 13,619 |
| Progressive Conservative | HARTMAN, Erna | 7,814 |
| Liberal | KRAWCHUK, Barry E. | 7,077 |
| Social Credit | WILLMS, Val. Paul | 1,026 |

1962 Canadian federal election
| Party | Candidate | Votes |
|---|---|---|
| New Democratic | Stanley Knowles | 12,797 |
| Progressive Conservative | John Maclean | 9,231 |
| Liberal | Barry Eugene Krawchuk | 5,443 |
| Social Credit | WEBSTER, David C. | 864 |
| Communist | Don Currie | 649 |

1958 Canadian federal election
| Party | Candidate | Votes |
|---|---|---|
| Progressive Conservative | John Maclean | 14,911 |
| Co-operative Commonwealth | Stanley Knowles | 13,536 |
| Liberal | Thomas R. Blaine | 3,552 |

1957 Canadian federal election
| Party | Candidate | Votes |
|---|---|---|
| Co-operative Commonwealth | Stanley Knowles | 15,229 |
| Progressive Conservative | John Maclean | 5,821 |
| Liberal | Harold St. George Stubbs | 4,813 |
| Social Credit | Gideon D. Mankey | 1,880 |

1953 Canadian federal election
| Party | Candidate | Votes |
|---|---|---|
| Co-operative Commonwealth | Stanley Knowles | 12,713 |
| Liberal | Peter Taraska | 7,535 |
| Progressive Conservative | Charles D. Lee | 1,760 |
| Labor–Progressive | William Cecil Ross | 1,606 |

1949 Canadian federal election
| Party | Candidate | Votes |
|---|---|---|
| Co-operative Commonwealth | Stanley Knowles | 15,389 |
| Liberal | William A. Molloy | 9,010 |
| Progressive Conservative | Richard R. Pattinson | 3,434 |
| Independent | Stephen Juba | 694 |

1945 Canadian federal election
| Party | Candidate | Votes |
|---|---|---|
| Co-operative Commonwealth | Stanley Knowles | 15,971 |
| Liberal | David M. Graham | 5,728 |
| Progressive Conservative | Mark J. Long | 4,711 |
| Labor–Progressive | John McNeil | 1,283 |
| Social Credit | Gordon C. Dodds | 1,077 |

Canadian federal by-election, November 30, 1942 Death of J. S. Woodsworth
| Party | Candidate | Votes | % | ±% |
|---|---|---|---|---|
| Co-operative Commonwealth | Stanley Knowles | 11,639 | 70.21 | +29.68 |
| Liberal | Konrad Johannesson | 4,718 | 28.46 | -11.63 |
| Unknown | Cyril E. Rice | 220 | 1.33 | – |
| Valid votes cast | | 16,577 | | |
| Co-operative Commonwealth hold | | Swing | | +20.66 |

1940 Canadian federal election
| Party | Candidate | Votes |
|---|---|---|
| Co-operative Commonwealth | J. S. Woodsworth | 11,324 |
| Liberal | Ambrose Roy McDonnell | 11,199 |
| National Government | Bjorn Stefansson | 5,412 |

1935 Canadian federal election
| Party | Candidate | Votes |
|---|---|---|
| Co-operative Commonwealth | James Shaver Woodsworth | 10,052 |
| Liberal | H.P. Albert Hermanson | 6,025 |
| Conservative | Richard Randolph Pattinson | 4,657 |
| Reconstruction | Thomas William Kilshaw | 2,490 |
| Social Credit | Charles Wesley Huffman | 1,035 |

1930 Canadian federal election
| Party | Candidate | Votes |
|---|---|---|
| Labour | James Shaver Woodsworth | 8,265 |
| Independent Conservative | Thomas Gargan | 2,028 |
| Communist | Martin Joseph Forkin | 492 |
Source: lop.parl.ca

1926 Canadian federal election
| Party | Candidate | Votes |
|---|---|---|
| Labour | James Shaver Woodsworth | 7,221 |
| Conservative | Jose Alexander Banfield | 4,220 |

1925 Canadian federal election
| Party | Candidate | Votes |
|---|---|---|
| Labour | J. S. Woodsworth | 4,794 |
| Conservative | Joseph Edwin Braid | 3,578 |
| Liberal | Edward Wesley Lowery | 1,689 |

== See also ==
- List of Canadian electoral districts
- Historical federal electoral districts of Canada
