= Pat Martin =

Canadian politician (born 1955)

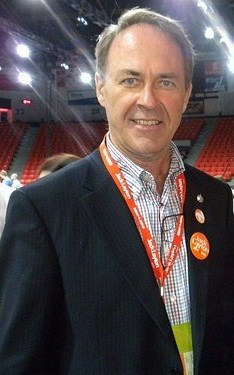
- Martin at the 2009 federal NDP convention

Member of Parliament for Winnipeg Centre
- In office June 2, 1997 – October 19, 2015
- Preceded by: David Walker
- Succeeded by: Robert-Falcon Ouellette

Chairman of the Standing Committee on Government Operations and Estimates
- In office 5 February 2015 – 4 August 2015
- Minister: Diane Finley
- Preceded by: Pierre-Luc Dusseault
- Succeeded by: Tom Lukiwski
- In office 9 June 2011 – 24 October 2013
- Minister: Rona Ambrose; Diane Finley
- Preceded by: John McKay
- Succeeded by: Pierre-Luc Dusseault

Personal details
- Born: December 13, 1955 (age 70) Winnipeg, Manitoba, Canada
- Party: New Democratic Party
- Spouse: Jennifer Prince
- Profession: Carpenter; trade unionist
- Website: patmartin.ca

Patrick D. "Pat" Martin (born December 13, 1955) is a Canadian politician. A member of the New Democratic Party (NDP), he was first elected to the House of Commons of Canada in the 1997 Canadian federal election, serving as the member of Parliament (MP) for Winnipeg Centre until his defeat in 2015.

== Career ==
Martin graduated from Argyle High School in 1974. He worked as a journeyman carpenter for several years, and was employed in forest service, mines and construction. Martin also served as business manager of the Manitoba Carpenters Union from 1989 to 1997, and was vice-president of the Manitoba Federation of Labour for a time. He has been a member of the executive of the Manitoba Building Trades Council, and was part of the Winnipeg 2000 Economic Development Committee.

Martin was first elected to the Canadian House of Commons in the 1997 federal election, defeating Liberal incumbent David Walker by a margin of 10,979 votes to 9,895. Martin was re-elected in the 2000 federal election, defeating Liberal Kevin Lamoureux by 11,263 votes to 9,310. He increased his margin of victory in the 2004 election, defeating Liberal candidate David Northcott by about 3,000 votes.

He supported Bill Blaikie for the NDP leadership in 2002–03.

He called for Svend Robinson to be removed from the NDP's foreign affairs portfolio in 2002, after Robinson's controversial visit to the Palestinian Authority.

Martin is an outspoken critic of the Canadian monarchy, both in parliament and in the media, citing the marriage of the Prince of Wales to the Duchess of Cornwall as a reason to abolish the institution.

In his book, Speaking Out Louder: Ideas That Work For Canadians, Jack Layton, then the Leader of the NDP, thanked Martin and his wife for loaning their Saltspring Island farmhouse for secluded writing."

When Liberal leadership candidate Joe Volpe received donations totalling $108,000 from Apotex executives and their wives and children, Martin suggested that these donations had the appearance of fraud. He filed an official complaint on May 29, asking elections commissioner Raymond Landry to investigate whether an attempt had been made to circumvent the Elections Act which banned corporate donations. Volpe responded by promising to return any donations that contravened the letter or spirit of the law.

In June 2008, Martin introduced a motion into the House of Commons calling on the government to amend the royal arms of Canada to incorporate symbols representing Canada's First Nations, Inuit and Métis peoples.

Martin introduced a private member's bill, C-248, in parliament to exonerate Louis Riel On May 5, 2011 at the Royal Ontario Museum Martin debated Tom Flanagan on the topic "Louis Riel deserved to Hang". In a National Post article he argued that Riel was a hero, not a traitor and, in reference to George R. D. Goulet's 1999 book on Riel, that Riel's execution was a "case of both justice and mercy denied".

Maclean's ranked him as runner up for best orator in parliament in 2011 behind John Baird.

On February 5, 2015, Martin stated that he would file a lawsuit against anyone who claimed he lived on Salt Spring Island. "They're going to get their asses sued," said Martin adding "I know a thing or two about libel," referring to his issue with a defamation suit, which he settled for an undisclosed sum with an Edmonton telemarketer. Martin owns a hobby farm on Salt Spring Island that he bought with his former wife and currently resides in Osborne Village in the riding of Winnipeg South Centre. When asked about a Salt Spring community event calendar from the local NDP association inviting people to "Come by and hear an Ottawa update from Salt Spring's unoffical [sic] MP Pat Martin," by Winnipeg Free Press journalist Mia Rabson, Martin stated that the Riding Association President "was being funny by calling him that."

Within a day of the writ drop for the 2015 federal election, Martin was endorsed by the United Fire Fighters of Winnipeg president Alex Forrest. Martin lost re-election in 2015.

Martin endorsed Alberta MP Heather McPherson in the 2026 New Democratic Party leadership election.

== Controversy ==
=== Youth For Christ ===
In 2010, while Youth For Christ was in the development stages of building a youth centre at the corner of Higgins and Main that would include a multi-sport gym, dance studio, fitness centre, skate-and-BMX park, drop-in centre, theatre, classroom, counselling facilities and a job-training centre, Martin stated that the social-service organization were "evangelical fundamentalists" who were "preying on vulnerable kids" and that the organization "offering much-needed sports opportunities is just their way of luring in young prospects." Martin also stated that the Federal government and City of Winnipeg providing funding to the inner city development equated to "taxpayer-funded proselytization." An article by the Winnipeg Free Press Editorial Board stated that if "the MP believes [Youth For Christ] should not receive any taxpayer money because he faithfully believes the organization is trying to convert "vulnerable, impressionable kids" to fundamentalist Christian views. If the good parliamentarian has any evidence to support his allegations, he should produce it immediately, or withdraw his comments." One week after criticising the organization and facing mounting criticism, Martin said he supported the development at Higgins and Main by stating that "Anything happening in the inner city is better than nothing."

=== Twitter ===
On November 17, 2011, Martin was criticized for using profane language on his Twitter account expressing anger over the Conservative government's use of closure in limiting debate in the House of Commons tweeting: "This is a fucking disgrace" and "There’s not a democracy in the world that would tolerate this jackboot shit." He also used profane language to criticize those on Twitter that had challenged his use of profanity tweeting "Fuck you" to one Twitter user. Martin refused to apologize. On December 20, 2012, Pat Martin tweeted: I'm not 'worked up' so much as 'fed up' with the rat faced whores in the [Conservative Party of Canada] who neglect to invite me to ancemnts [sic] in my riding" and "Look...Given the parliamentary session we've just endured, the term 'rat faced whores' is using a great deal of restraint..." after not receiving an invitation to an event in his riding.

After a heated exchange, Martin swore off Twitter and tweeted "I apologize for my regrettable and inappropriate language", and "It seems some people shouldn’t tweet so with this, I sign off." An NDP spokesperson confirmed Martin's decision stating "these comments were simply inappropriate and unacceptable," and that "Mr. Martin agrees and we understand that he has decided to stop using his Twitter account."

=== Defamation lawsuit and donations ===
Upon revelations about the robocall scandal in February, Martin publicly accused Racknine of being behind the automated calls that saw voters misdirected to non-existent polling locations during the May 2011 federal election. Racknine filed a defamation lawsuit for $5 million in damages. Martin ended up settling the defamation lawsuit against him and publicly apologized and stated that Racknine was "merely an innocent intermediary not a participant in electoral fraud". Due to the costs awarded to Racknine, Martin received a loan from the NDP and accepted donations from unions to help fund his defamation suit and pay for the settlement. Documents filed with the federal ethics commissioner showed Martin accepted contributions to a legal defence fund from the Canadian Labour Congress, the United Steelworkers and the Canadian Union of Public Employees, and 14 other unions or locals.

Duff Conacher, founder of Democracy Watch, asked Martin to disclose the exact amount each of the two dozen organizations has donated to the trust fund set up to pay off his legal bill. "You're not allowed to be in the appearance of a conflict of interest, even if the gift does not change your mind from what you already believed. You can't have it. If you have that, you don't have democracy. You have a system of where the dollar wins and that's not democracy," said Conacher. Martin said it would be "ludicrous" to think the donations would influence his position on labour issues saying that "If anybody thinks I could become more friendly to trade unions, then they don’t know me very well," adding "I’m a socialist and trade unionist and former head of the carpenters’ union in Manitoba." In two instances, the ethics commissioner directed Martin to return more than $20,000 involving donations from two unions that he had dealings with as an MP.

=== Underwear comments in House of Commons ===
After standing in the House of Commons during a procedural vote, which is against protocol, Martin said that his tight underwear required him to stand. The comments trended across Twitter and made international headlines including CNN’s Ridiculist. Martin later admitted that the story was fabricated.

=== Comments during 2015 federal election ===
During the 2015 Canadian federal election, Martin called Don Woodstock, the Green Party candidate, a "son of a bitch" and at a later time was caught calling him a "fucking prick" during a debate on issues affecting downtown Winnipeg in which Woodstock questioned Martin's record on mental health issues. Martin also called Robert-Falcon Ouellette, the Liberal candidate, "full of shit" and a "political slut" for considering other parties before choosing to run for the Liberals. Martin then targeted Ouellette's wife and accused her of being afraid to venture into the riding because of fear of theft. Martin later apologized for his comments.

== Electoral record ==
2015 Canadian federal election: Winnipeg Centre
| Party | Candidate | Votes | % | ±% | Expenditures |
|---|---|---|---|---|---|
| Liberal | Robert-Falcon Ouellette | 18,471 | 54.51 | +43.44 | $78,138.26 |
| New Democratic | Pat Martin | 9,490 | 28.01 | -25.65 | $104,378.44 |
| Conservative | Allie Szarkiewicz | 4,189 | 12.36 | -15.28 | $32,966.82 |
| Green | Don Woodstock | 1,379 | 4.07 | -2.98 | $38,782.49 |
| Christian Heritage | Scott Miller | 221 | 0.65 | – | $1,210.15 |
| Communist | Darrell Rankin | 135 | 0.40 | -0.19 | – |
| Total valid votes/expense limit | | 33,885 | 100.00 | | $192,170.62 |
| Total rejected ballots | | 281 | 0.82 | – | |
| Turnout | | 34,166 | 61.41 | – | |
| Eligible voters | | 55,633 | | | |
| Liberal gain from New Democratic | | Swing | | +34.59 | |
Source: Elections Canada

2011 Canadian federal election: Winnipeg Centre
| Party | Candidate | Votes | % | ±% | Expenditures |
|---|---|---|---|---|---|
| New Democratic | Pat Martin | 13,928 | 53.66 | +4.74 | – |
| Conservative | Bev Pitura | 7,173 | 27.64 | +5.99 | – |
| Liberal | Allan Wise | 2,872 | 11.07 | -4.55 | – |
| Green | Jacqueline Romanow | 1,830 | 7.05 | -4.01 | – |
| Communist | Darrell Rankin | 152 | 0.59 | +0.12 | – |
| Total valid votes/expense limit | | 25,955 | 100.00 | | – |
| Total rejected ballots | | 248 | 0.95 | +0.05 | |
| Turnout | | 26,203 | 49.02 | +6 | |
| Eligible voters | | 53,452 | – | – | |

2008 Canadian federal election: Winnipeg Centre
| Party | Candidate | Votes | % | ±% | Expenditures |
|---|---|---|---|---|---|
| New Democratic | Pat Martin | 12,285 | 48.92 | +0.5 | $42,608 |
| Conservative | Kenny Daodu | 5,437 | 21.65 | +2.1 | $20,177 |
| Liberal | Daniel Hurley | 3,922 | 15.62 | -8.7 | $37,980 |
| Green | Jessie Klassen | 2,777 | 11.06 | +4.0 | $2,733 |
| Independent | Joe Chan | 226 | 0.90 | – | – |
| First Peoples National | Lyle Morrisseau | 212 | 0.84 | – | – |
| Independent | Ed Ackerman | 135 | 0.54 | – | – |
| Communist | Darrell Rankin | 119 | 0.47 | -0.2 | – |
| Total valid votes/expense limit | | 25,113 | 100.00 | | $77,206 |
| Total rejected ballots | | 227 | 0.90 | +0.1 | |
| Turnout | | 25,340 | 43 | -6 | |

2006 Canadian federal election: Winnipeg Centre
| Party | Candidate | Votes | % | ±% | Expenditures |
|---|---|---|---|---|---|
| New Democratic | Pat Martin | 13,805 | 48.4 | +3.0 | $58,778 |
| Liberal | Ray St. Germain | 6,940 | 24.3 | -10.4 | $27,375 |
| Conservative | Helen Sterzer | 5,554 | 19.5 | +5.9 | $37,740 |
| Green | Gary Gervais | 2,010 | 7.1 | +2.8 | $2,651 |
| Communist | Anna-Celestrya Carr | 199 | 0.7 | +0.3 | $295 |
| Total valid votes | | 28,508 | 100.0 | | – |
| Total rejected ballots | | 231 | 0.8 | +0.1 | |
| Turnout | | 28,739 | 49 | +4 | |

2004 Canadian federal election: Winnipeg Centre
| Party | Candidate | Votes | % | ±% | Expenditures |
|---|---|---|---|---|---|
| New Democratic | Pat Martin | 12,149 | 45.4 | +4.1 | $51,914 |
| Liberal | David Northcott | 9,285 | 34.7 | +0.6 | $67,134 |
| Conservative | Robert Eng | 3,631 | 13.6 | -8.0 | $7,572 |
| Green | Robin (Pilar) Faye | 1,151 | 4.3 | +1.7 | $2,087 |
| Marijuana | John M. Siedleski | 346 | 1.3 | – | – |
| Communist | Anna-Celestrya Carr | 114 | 0.4 | -0.1 | $654 |
| Independent | Douglas Edward Schweitzer | 92 | 0.3 | – | – |
| Total valid votes | | 26,768 | 100.0 | | – |
| Total rejected ballots | | 188 | 0.7 | | |
| Turnout | | 26,956 | 45.1 | | |

Note: Conservative vote is compared to the total of the Canadian Alliance vote and Progressive Conservative vote in 2000 election.

2000 Canadian federal election: Winnipeg Centre
| Party | Candidate | Votes | % | Expenditures |
|---|---|---|---|---|
| New Democratic | Pat Martin | 11,263 | 41.26 | $55,756.93 |
| Liberal | Kevin Lamoureux | 9,310 | 34.11 | $55,979.28 |
| Alliance | Reg Smith | 3,975 | 14.56 | $8,032.54 |
| Progressive Conservative | Michel Allard | 1,915 | 7.02 | $1,460.02 |
| Green | Mikel Magnusson | 698 | 2.56 | $1,572.64 |
| Communist | Harold Dyck | 134 | 0.49 | $288.78 |
| Total valid votes | | 27,295 | 100.00 | |
| Total rejected ballots | | 236 | | |
| Turnout | | 27,531 | 52.56 | |
| Electors on the lists | | 52,383 | | |
Sources: Official Results, Elections Canada and Financial Returns, Elections Canada.

1997 Canadian federal election: Winnipeg Centre
| Party | Candidate | Votes | % | Expenditures |
|---|---|---|---|---|
| New Democratic | Pat Martin | 10,979 | 40.89 | $48,662 |
| Liberal | David Walker | 9,895 | 36.86 | $47,283 |
| Reform | Reginald A. Smith | 3,095 | 11.53 | $3,175 |
| Progressive Conservative | Campbell Alexander | 2,442 | 9.10 | $6,171 |
| Independent | Greg Krawchuk | 148 | 0.55 | $163 |
| Marxist–Leninist | Glenn Michalchuk | 136 | 0.51 | $11 |
| Communist | Darrell Rankin | 108 | 0.40 | $1,913 |
| Libertarian | Didz Zuzens | 44 | 0.16 | $0 |
| Total valid votes | | 26,847 | 100.00 | |
| Rejected ballots | | 374 | | |
| Turnout | | 27,221 | 57.00 | |
| Electors on the lists | | 47,753 | | |
Sources: Official Results, Elections Canada and Financial Returns, Elections Canada.
