= Methodist Church (Canada) =

Former Methodist Church in Canada

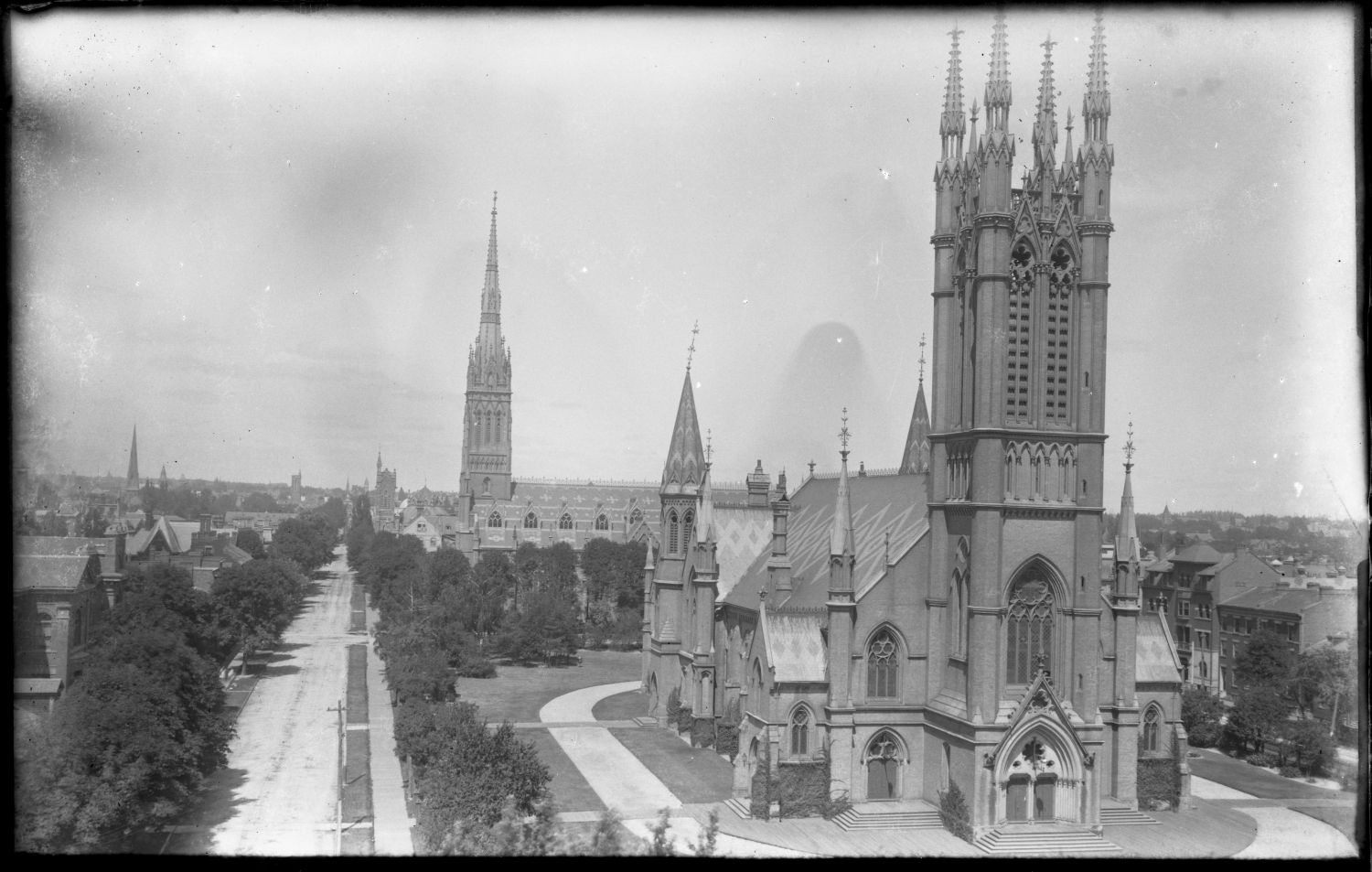
- Metropolitan Methodist Church in 1896
- Classification: Protestant
- Orientation: Methodist
- Polity: Connectional
- Associations: World Methodist Council
- Region: Canada, Bermuda
- Origin: 1884
- Merger of: Methodist Church of Canada; Methodist Episcopal Church in Canada; Bible Christian Church of Canada; Primitive Methodist Church in Canada
- Merged into: United Church of Canada (1925)

The Methodist Church was the major Methodist denomination in Canada from its founding in 1884 until it merged with two other denominations to form the United Church of Canada in 1925. The Methodist Church was itself formed from the merger of four smaller Methodist denominations with ties to British and US Methodist denominations.

== History ==
Laurence Coughlan was a lay preacher of the British Methodist movement. He arrived in Newfoundland in 1766 and began working among Protestant English and Irish settlers. In 1779 William Black, born in England but raised in Nova Scotia was converted to Methodism and commenced evangelizing in the Maritimes, his work falling under the supervision of the British Wesleyan Methodist Church in 1800. In 1855 this body formed the Wesleyan Methodist Conference of Eastern British America.

Under the leadership of William Losee, meanwhile, the Methodist Episcopal Church in the US, established on Christmas Day in 1784, began work in 1791 among British immigrants to Upper Canada. By 1828 the Methodist Episcopal work in Canada had formally severed ties with the US. In 1833 most of it joined with the British Wesleyans to form the Wesleyan Methodist Church in Canada, adding to itself the Methodist people of Lower Canada in 1854. That part of it which absented itself from the union re-formed into the Methodist Episcopal Church of Canada in 1834, eventually growing into the second largest Methodist body in Canada.

In turn the Wesleyan Methodist Church in Canada and the Wesleyan Methodist Conference of Eastern British America united in 1874, annexing as well the Methodist New Connexion Church in Canada (itself an amalgam of several small groups), thereby forming the Methodist Church of Canada.

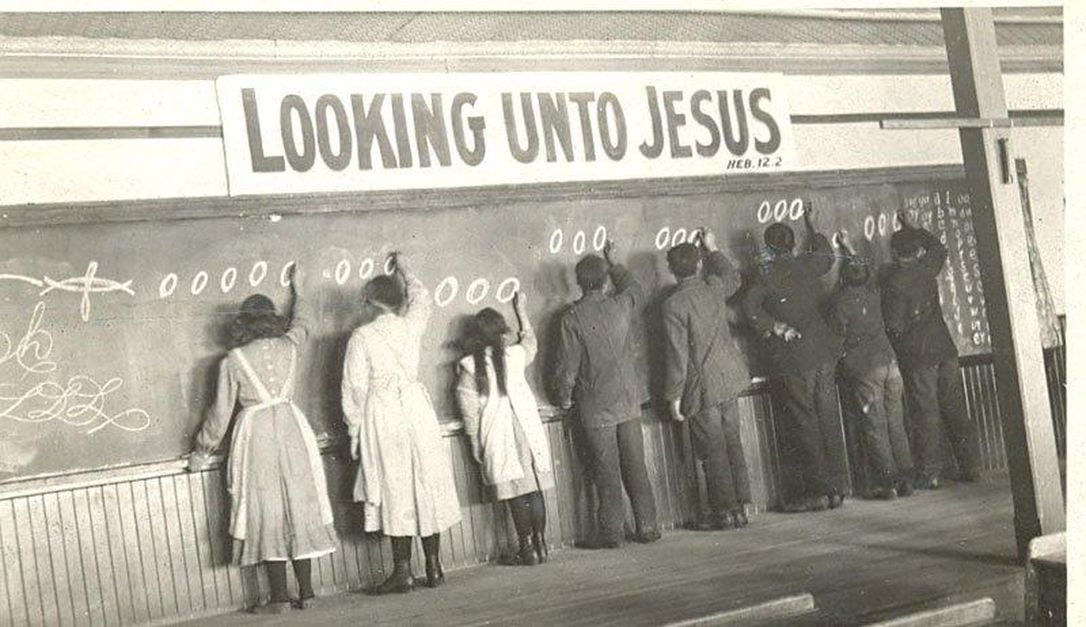
The Red Deer Industrial School, operated by the Methodist Church, had one of the highest residential school mortality rates in Canada. Photo circa 1914.

In 1884 this body joined with the Methodist Episcopal Church in Canada, together with the Bible Christian Church of Canada and the Primitive Methodist Church in Canada, bringing to birth the Methodist Church, with churches in Canada, Newfoundland (which at the time was not part of the Canadian Confederation) and Bermuda. This lattermost union made the Methodist Church the largest Protestant denomination in Canada. It now included all Canadian Methodists with the exception of several very small groups: the British Methodist Episcopal Church (a development of the African Methodist Episcopal Church serving chiefly people of colour), two German-speaking bodies (the Evangelical Association and the United Brethren in Christ), and the Free Methodist Church (a body that had begun in New York State in 1860 and extended itself into Canada.) The church influenced the establishment of public education and residential schools in Canada through the works of Egerton Ryerson. Indigenous figures such as Peter Jones were instrumental in the establishment of early residential schools in the 19th century, but support waned among Indigenous leaders after their involvement was sidelined later on.

== Merger to form the United Church of Canada ==
In 1925, the Methodist Church united with 70% of the Presbyterian Church in Canada and 96% of the Congregational Union of Canada to form The United Church of Canada. The Methodist Church with its notable benefactors the Eaton and Massey families was the sponsor of Victoria College at the University of Toronto, once and still a mainstay of intellectual rigour at that university, and the alma mater of many of Canada's leaders and most famous thinkers.

Although Methodists were never a majority of anglophone Canadians or even Torontonians, they exerted significant political and social influence in southern Ontario, particularly in Toronto. Many of the causes espoused by and associated with the United Church in the 20th century were, although also associated with other Evangelical Protestant denominations, especially Methodist ones, in particular Sabbatarianism, temperance, the rights of women and missions to the aboriginal peoples of Canada.

Although Methodism in Canada abandoned that label in 1925, (Note: Unlike the label Presbyterian, as to which the United Church contended with the continuing or "non-concurring" Presbyterians for many years after Church Union.) many United Church people in Canada are entirely unaware of the term. The foremost Canadian Methodist, Egerton Ryerson, is commemorated by the numerous Ryerson United Churches across the country.

== See also ==
- Henry Flesher Bland
- Albert Carman
- Samuel Dwight Chown
- James Woodsworth
- Canadian Methodist Mission
