= Maureen Hemphill =

Canadian politician (1937–2026)

Member of the Manitoba Legislative Assembly for Logan
- In office 1981–1990
- Preceded by: William Jenkins
- Succeeded by: Flor Marcelino

Personal details
- Born: Maureen Lucille Miller; January 26, 1937 Grand Forks, British Columbia, Canada
- Died: February 22, 2026 (aged 89) Winnipeg, Manitoba, Canada
- Party: New Democratic Party of Manitoba
- Spouse: H. David Hemphill (divorced)
- Children: 4

Maureen Lucille Hemphill (née Miller; January 26, 1937 – February 22, 2026) was a Canadian politician from the province of Manitoba. She served in the cabinet of NDP Premier Howard Pawley, and was an unsuccessful candidate for the party's leadership in 1988.

== Life and career ==
Hemphill was the daughter of James Leroy Miller and Elaine Agnes McParlor, born in Grand Forks, British Columbia, and was educated at Bralorne. She served on the Assiniboine South School Board in 1969, 1970 and 1973. She married H. David Hemphill but they had divorced by the 1980s.

She first ran for the provincial legislature in 1977, in the southwest Winnipeg riding of Charleswood. She came a distant second behind Progressive Conservative leader Sterling Lyon, whose party defeated Edward Schreyer's New Democratic Party to win the election.

The Manitoba NDP regained power under Howard Pawley's leadership in 1981, and Hemphill was easily elected for the north-central Winnipeg riding of Logan (former Mayor of Winnipeg Stephen Juba came a distant second behind her running as an independent candidate). Hemphill was appointed Minister of Education on November 30, 1981, and retained this position for the entirety of the Pawley government's first mandate. She increased state support for private and parochial schools while holding this portfolio, despite the NDP's historical objections to such funding.

Hemphill was re-elected without difficulty in 1986 (defeating future Liberal MLA Kevin Lamoureux) and was appointed Minister of Business Development and Tourism on April 17, 1986. On September 21, 1987, a cabinet shuffle made her the Minister of Community Services.

After the Pawley government lost a parliamentary vote of non-confidence in 1988, Hemphill became a candidate to serve as the party's new leader. She placed fourth on the first ballot, and gave her support to third-place candidate Andy Anstett, who was eliminated on the second ballot. Afterward, she supported Len Harapiak, who lost to Gary Doer.

Hemphill was re-elected in the 1988 Manitoba general election, albeit by a reduced margin. She was not a candidate in 1990.

In 1993, Hemphill ran for the national New Democratic Party in the riding of Winnipeg North Centre, but placed second to incumbent Liberal David Walker.

Hemphill died on February 22, 2026, at the age of 89.
