= Henry Flesher Bland =

The Reverend Henry Flesher Bland
- Born: 23 August 1818; Addingham, England
- Died: 29 December 1898 (aged 80); Smiths Falls, Ontario, Canada
- Spouse: Emma Levell (m. 1846)
- Children: Salem Bland
- Religion: Christianity (Methodist)
- Ordained: 1862

Henry Flesher Bland (1818–1898) was a Methodist minister of the Wesleyan tradition.

Bland was born on 23 August 1818 in Addingham, England, to a family long rooted in the Methodist faith. He spent his early adulthood in England and participated in church work as a lay preacher. He married Emma Levell in 1846. Bland and his family emigrated to Lower Canada in 1858 and took up residence in Montreal. A lack of church funds made his permanent employment there unlikely. However, he was appointed to the Lachute mission and was ordained there in 1862.

Bland became an important person in the Methodist Church growth during his career. His reputation as a forceful preacher and church builder earned him a place of honor in the history of Methodism in Canada.

Henry Flesher Bland was the father of Salem Bland, who was also a Methodist minister and a significant figure in the Canadian Social Gospel movement.

Bland died on 29 December 1898 in Smiths Falls, Ontario.
