= James Woodsworth =

Canadian Methodist minister and missionary

James Woodsworth (1843–1917) was a late-19th-century Superintendent of Methodist Missions in Western Canada. He fathered James Shaver Woodsworth, who was the first leader of the Co-operative Commonwealth Federation (which became the New Democratic Party).

Woodsworth was born in Toronto and son of Harold Richard Woodsworth and ordained a Methodist minister in 1868.

He married E. Josephine Shaver in 1868 and was minister in various towns in Ontario before heading west:

- 1867–1869 Vespra (Simcoe County)
- 1871 Nottawasaga, Ontario (Simcoe County)
- 1880 Chairman Bracebridge District
- 1882–1887 Portage la Prairie
- 1891 Superintendent of Methodist Missions in Manitoba and the North-West

He was very passionate about the importance of the church for the first settlers for educational, moral and religious purposes in their lives and believed that the Canadian west would some day become one of the most important places in the world from travel between Europe and Asia, and the sheer amount of grain producing power it held.

During his time in the west he travelled to First Nations communities in Northern Manitoba and Southern Alberta, and visited settlers in Alberta, Saskatchewan, Manitoba and British Columbia. In his trip to Northern Manitoba he visited the community of Norway House and many more on the northern end of lake Winnipeg. He made mention of the beauty of the Spider Islands, an Icelandic farm on an island in lake Winnipeg and the general state of the church in northern Manitoba.

On his trip to the Blackfoot in Alberta he saw several graves and mentioned how they left the deceased's belongings on his grave since he would need them where he went. He also wrote an account of a medicine wheel dance. On his first trip through settler towns in Alberta he wrote of how that in one community of First Nations between Edmonton and Calgary he saw that of 180 residents a few years ago 100 had died of disease and the 15 school age children dropped to 5 and were mostly orphans after the disease swept the village. A similar story was told to him in northern Manitoba when a man came across a whole village of dead from disease.

He made several trips to Alberta and was convinced that it would grow to be the heart of Canada, specifically the Peace River Valley, and was focused on getting as many men to preach for the communities as possible, most of the land was reliant on a handful of men for Methodism.

On his trip to British Columbia he went to Port Simpson and the communities around it, talking with both the white and indigenous residents of the town. He also visited Sitka in Alaska due to the ship he was travelling on going there on its journey before heading south again. One enigma he talked of was that some totem poles had what appeared to be writing on the top.

Once he returned to Manitoba he was very invested in methodism in Winnipeg, specifically the school for the poor children in the north end started by a young Irish woman, both his son James and Nellie McClung wrote about the school and the good it did.

Before he retired he travelled to Ireland and England several times in search of new men to come to the west, with his efforts bearing fruit with around 300 men going west. Some of the places he visited were Belfast, Leeds and Cardiff, though he visited many more.

His book was written in 1913 at the request of the methodist church for an account of expansion in the west, but wasn't published until late 1917, a few months after he died. He book is dedicated: "To My Wife and Children who though not always journeying with me have been my fellow-travelers."

Woodsworth died in 1917 in Winnipeg at his home on 60 Maryland Street, which still stands today.

He had 5 children including James Shaver Woodsworth and Joseph Francis Woodsworth.

== Works by ==
- Thirty Years in the Canadian North-West James Woodsworth (1917) McClelland, Goodchild & Stewart, Limited, Toronto, Ontario

== See also ==
- Methodist Church of Canada
- Egerton Ryerson
