= Winnipeg—St. James =

Former federal electoral district in Manitoba, Canada

Winnipeg—St. James was a federal electoral district in the province of Manitoba, Canada, that was represented in the House of Commons of Canada from 1979 to 1997. It was in the north end of the city of Winnipeg. This riding was created in 1976 from parts of Winnipeg North Centre and Winnipeg South Centre ridings.

The electoral district was abolished in 1996, when it was re-distributed between Charleswood—Assiniboine and Winnipeg North Centre ridings.

== Electoral history ==
1979 Canadian federal election
| Party | Candidate | Votes | % | ±% |
|---|---|---|---|---|
| Progressive Conservative | LANE, Bob | 12,640 | | |
| New Democratic Party | SYMS, J. Frank | 11,747 | | |
| Liberal | MERCIER, Richard | 7,636 | | |
| Marxist–Leninist | LLOYD, Linda | 135 | | |

1980 Canadian federal election
| Party | Candidate | Votes | % | ±% |
|---|---|---|---|---|
| New Democratic Party | KEEPER, Cyril | 11,078 | | |
| Progressive Conservative | LANE, Bob | 10,640 | | |
| Liberal | MERCIER, Richard | 7,531 | | |
| Rhinoceros | SIMMONS, Al Jukebox | 236 | | |
| Marxist–Leninist | LLOYD, Linda | 77 | | |

1984 Canadian federal election
| Party | Candidate | Votes | % | ±% |
|---|---|---|---|---|
| Progressive Conservative | MINAKER, George | 12,523 | | |
| New Democratic Party | DONNER, Lissa | 9,843 | | |
| Liberal | RYBACK, Diana | 6,007 | | |
| Confederation of Regions | DEBRECEN, Fred | 830 | | |
| Libertarian | TALARICO, John R. | 164 | | |
| Communist | PUGH, Paul | 86 | | |

1988 Canadian federal election
| Party | Candidate | Votes | % | ±% |
|---|---|---|---|---|
| Liberal | HARVARD, John | 18,695 | | |
| Progressive Conservative | MINAKER, George | 16,993 | | |
| New Democratic Party | SAWATSKY, Len | 4,258 | | |
| Reform | KIRKHAM, Lloyd E. | 1,549 | | |
| No affiliation | LLOYD, Linda | 106 | | |
| Communist | HANRAHAN, Nigel | 92 | | |

1993 Canadian federal election
| Party | Candidate | Votes |
|---|---|---|
| Liberal | John Harvard | 21,628 |
| Reform | Peter Blumenschein | 8,249 |
| Progressive Conservative | Dave Schioler | 5,096 |
| New Democratic | John Hutton | 2,598 |
| National | Paul Reid | 1,542 |
| Natural Law | Ron Decter | 155 |
| Independent | Guy Pickell | 58 |
| Marxist–Leninist | Glenn Michalchuk | 45 |
| Canada Party | Bjarne Aasland | 38 |

== See also ==
- List of Canadian electoral districts
- Historical federal electoral districts of Canada
