= Canadian federal election results in Winnipeg =

Seats obtained by party in Winnipeg

Liberal
Conservative
New Democratic
Progressive Conservative (defunct)
Co-operative Commonwealth (defunct)
Labour (defunct)
Independents

This is page shows results of Canadian federal elections in the Winnipeg area.

== Regional profile ==
The city of Winnipeg has traditionally been a mixed bag, in which all three major parties have bases of support. The northern part of the city is a very left-leaning area which has some of the strongest New Democratic Party support in all of Canada. The south end (with many Jewish and Franco-Manitoban voters) is one of the few areas in the Prairies where the Liberals have been successful since the 1990s. The outer suburban areas tilt rightward, but this was obscured for most of the 1990s by massive vote-splitting.

The end of vote-splitting on the right allowed the Conservatives to win two seats in 2004, in one case defeating a star candidate. The Conservatives picked up another seat in 2006, one more in 2008 and two additional seats in 2011—including Elmwood—Transcona, the former seat of longtime NDP MP and former deputy leader Bill Blaikie. In 2015, however, the Liberals took all but one seat in Winnipeg en route to their second-largest seat count ever. The only seat that didn't get swept up in the Liberal tide was Elmwood—Transcona, where Blaikie's son Daniel Blaikie narrowly retook the seat for the NDP. It was the first time since 1968, and only the second time since the end of World War II, that the centre-right was completely shut out of Winnipeg in the absence of vote-splitting. The Tories picked up the outer suburban seats of Charleswood—St. James—Assiniboia—Headingley and Kildonan—St. Paul in 2019.

=== Votes by party throughout time ===
Election	Liberal	Conservative	New Democratic	Green	People's	PC	Reform / Alliance	Others
1979	78,982; 26.7%	—N/a	102,357; 34.6%	—N/a	—N/a	112,849; 38.1%	—N/a	1,675; 0.5%
1980	83,438; 31.6%	—N/a	92,736; 35.2%	—N/a	—N/a	85,509; 32.4%	—N/a	2,082; 0.8%
1984	81,268; 27.5%	—	86,792; 29.4%	No candidate	—	118,389; 40.1%	—	8,579; 2.9%
1988	133,092; 44.8%	—	59,611; 20.1%	No candidate	—	94,968; 32.0%	6,245; 2.1%	3,238; 1.1%
1993	154,843; 53.0%	—	49,930; 17.1%	No candidate	—	24,158; 8.3%	48,442; 16.6%	14,976; 5.1%
1997	112,004; 41.3%	—	71,701; 26.5%	No candidate	—	37,359; 13.8%	46,607; 17.2%	3,324; 1.2%
2000	107,400; 38.5%	—	68,767; 24.7%	1,159; 0.4%	—	38,727; 13.9%	60,102; 21.5%	2,798; 1.0%
2004	110,349; 40.1%	81,973; 29.8%	71,803; 26.1%	7,053; 2.6%	—	Merged into Conservative Party		3,974; 1.4%
2006	96,426; 32.2%	104,697; 34.9%	84,325; 28.1%	11,578; 3.9%	—	Merged into Conservative Party		2,895; 1.0%
2008	64,986; 23.4%	118,082; 42.5%	75,685; 27.3%	16,806; 6.1%	—	Merged into Conservative Party		2,067; 0.7%
2011	66,655; 22.9%	135,189; 46.5%	78,413; 27.0%	9,429; 3.2%	—	Merged into Conservative Party		954; 0.3%
2015	186,453; 52.9%	105,732; 30.0%	50,226; 14.2%	9,166; 2.6%	—	Merged into Conservative Party		983; 0.3%
2019	123,666; 35.9%	116,316; 33.8%	80,951; 23.5%	15,919; 4.6%	5,374; 1.6%	Merged into Conservative Party		2,011; 0.6%
2021	126,187; 37.8%	98,480; 29.5%	88,501; 26.5%	5,447; 1.6%	13,770; 4.1%	Merged into Conservative Party		1,320; 0.4%
2025	190,716; 50.2%	136,352; 35.9%	47,131; 12.4%	2,098; 0.6%	2,736; 0.7%	Merged into Conservative Party		738; 0.2%

Votes by party in Winnipeg

Liberal
Conservative
New Democratic
Green
People's
Reform (defunct)
Alliance (defunct)
Progressive Conservative (defunct)

== Detailed results ==
=== 2021 ===
Electoral district	Candidates						Incumbent
Electoral district	Liberal	Conservative	NDP	Green	PPC	Other	Incumbent
Charleswood—St. James—Assiniboia—Headingley	Doug Eyolfson; 17,651; 38.98%	Marty Morantz; 18,111; 40.00%	Madelaine Dwyer; 6,974; 15.40%	Vanessa Parks; 947; 2.09%	Angela Van Hussen; 1,594; 3.52%		Marty Morantz
Elmwood—Transcona	Sara Mirwaldt; 6,169; 14.74%	Rejeanne Caron; 11,768; 28.13%	Daniel Blaikie; 20,791; 49.69%	Devlin Hinchey; 676; 1.62%	Jamie Cumming; 2,435; 5.82%		Daniel Blaikie
Kildonan—St. Paul	Mary-Jane Bennett; 12,934; 29.43%	Raquel Dancho; 18,375; 41.81%	Emily Clark; 10,313; 23.47%		Sean Howe; 2,325; 5.29%		Raquel Dancho
Saint Boniface—Saint Vital	Dan Vandal; 19,908; 43.78%	Shola Agboola; 12,749; 28.04%	Meghan Waters; 9,767; 21.48%	Laurent Poliquin; 676; 1.49%	Jane MacDiarmid; 1,978; 4.35%	Sébastien CoRhino (Rhino.); 80 0.18%	Dan Vandal
Saint Boniface—Saint Vital	Dan Vandal; 19,908; 43.78%	Shola Agboola; 12,749; 28.04%	Meghan Waters; 9,767; 21.48%	Laurent Poliquin; 676; 1.49%	Jane MacDiarmid; 1,978; 4.35%	Matthew Correia (VCP); 17 0.04%	Dan Vandal
Saint Boniface—Saint Vital	Dan Vandal; 19,908; 43.78%	Shola Agboola; 12,749; 28.04%	Meghan Waters; 9,767; 21.48%	Laurent Poliquin; 676; 1.49%	Jane MacDiarmid; 1,978; 4.35%	14 independents (Note: Independents of Saint Boniface—Saint Vital (number of votes, percentage): Scott A A Anderson (58, 0.13%); Denis Berthiaume (16, 0.04%); Jean-Denis Boudreault (24, 0.05%); Naomi Crisostomo (31, 0.07%); Charles Currie (25, 0.05%); Manon Lili Desbiens (11, 0.02%); Alexandra Engering (14, 0.03%); Scott Falkingham (14, 0.03%); Kerri Hildebrandt (31, 0.07%); Ryan Huard (14, 0.03%); Conrad Lukawski (7, 0.02%); Eliana Rosenblum (13, 0.03%); Patrick Strzalkowski (21, 0.05%); Tomas Szuchewycz (15, 0.03%))	Dan Vandal
Winnipeg Centre	Paul Ong; 8,446; 28.39%	Sabrina Brenot; 3,818; 12.83%	Leah Gazan; 14,962; 50.29%	Andrew Brown; 708; 2.38%	Bhavni Bhakoo; 1,229; 4.13%	Jamie Buhler (Libert.); 373 1.25%	Leah Gazan
Winnipeg Centre	Paul Ong; 8,446; 28.39%	Sabrina Brenot; 3,818; 12.83%	Leah Gazan; 14,962; 50.29%	Andrew Brown; 708; 2.38%	Bhavni Bhakoo; 1,229; 4.13%	Debra Wall (Animal); 213 0.72%	Leah Gazan
Winnipeg North	Kevin Lamoureux; 16,442; 52.35%	Anas Kassem; 4,126; 13.14%	Melissa Chung-Mowat; 8,998; 28.65%	Angela Brydges; 418; 1.33%	Patrick Neilan; 1,315; 4.19%	Robert Crooks (Comm.); 109; 0.35%	Kevin Lamoureux
Winnipeg South	Terry Duguid; 22,423; 47.46%	Melanie Maher; 15,967; 33.80%	Aiden Kahanovitch; 6,632; 14.04%	Greg Boettcher; 681; 1.44%	Byron Curtis Gryba; 1,542; 3.26%		Terry Duguid
Winnipeg South Centre	Jim Carr; 22,214; 45.55%	Joyce Bateman; 13,566; 27.82%	Julia Riddell; 10,064; 20.64%	Douglas Hemmerling; 1,341; 2.75%	Chase Wells; 1,352; 2.77%	Cam Scott (Comm.); 234; 0.48%	Jim Carr

=== 2019 ===
Electoral district	Candidates							Incumbent
Electoral district	Liberal	Conservative	NDP	Green	PPC	Christian Heritage	Other	Incumbent
Charleswood—St. James—Assiniboia—Headingley	Doug Eyolfson; 16,398; 35.47%	Marty Morantz; 18,815; 40.70%	Ken St. George; 6,556; 14.18%	Kristin Lauhn-Jensen; 2,178; 4.71%	Steven Fletcher; 1,975; 4.27%	Melissa Penner; 166; 0.36%	Brian Ho (Ind.); 140; 0.30%	Doug Eyolfson
Elmwood—Transcona	Jennifer Malabar; 5,346; 12.33%	Lawrence Toet; 16,240; 37.45%	Daniel Blaikie; 19,786; 45.63%	Kelly Manweiler; 1,480; 3.41%	Noel Gautron; 512; 1.18%			Daniel Blaikie
Kildonan—St. Paul	MaryAnn Mihychuk; 12,356; 27.89%	Raquel Dancho; 19,856; 44.82%	Evan Krosney; 9,387; 21.19%	Rylan Reed; 1,777; 4.01%	Martin Deck; 510; 1.15%	Spencer Katerynuk; 304; 0.69%	Eduard Hiebert (Ind.); 108; 0.24%	MaryAnn Mihychuk
Saint Boniface—Saint Vital	Dan Vandal; 20,300; 42.88%	Rejeanne Caron; 15,436; 32.61%	Billie Cross; 8,037; 16.98%	Ben Linnick; 2,671; 5.64%	Adam McAllister; 591; 1.25%		Sharma Baljeet (Ind.); 303; 0.64%	Dan Vandal
Winnipeg Centre	Robert-Falcon Ouellette; 10,704; 33.74%	Ryan Dyck; 5,561; 17.53%	Leah Gazan; 13,073; 41.21%	Andrea Shalay; 1,661; 5.24%	Yogi Henderson; 474; 1.49%	Stephanie Hein; 251; 0.79%		Robert-Falcon Ouellette
Winnipeg North	Kevin Lamoureux; 15,581; 47.60%	Jordyn Ham; 6,820; 20.83%	Kyle Mason; 8,469; 25.87%	Sai Shanthanand Rajagopal; 906; 2.77%	Victor Ong; 324; 0.99%	Henry Hizon; 279; 0.85%	Kathy Doyle (Ind.); 231 0.71%	Kevin Lamoureux
Winnipeg North	Kevin Lamoureux; 15,581; 47.60%	Jordyn Ham; 6,820; 20.83%	Kyle Mason; 8,469; 25.87%	Sai Shanthanand Rajagopal; 906; 2.77%	Victor Ong; 324; 0.99%	Henry Hizon; 279; 0.85%	Andrew Taylor (Comm.); 125 0.38%	Kevin Lamoureux
Winnipeg South	Terry Duguid; 20,182; 42.14%	Melanie Maher; 18,537; 38.71%	Jean-Paul Lapointe; 6,678; 13.94%	Paul Bettess; 2,073; 4.33%	Mirwais Nasiri; 419; 0.87%			Terry Duguid
Winnipeg South Centre	Jim Carr; 22,799; 45.00%	Joyce Bateman; 15,051; 29.71%	Elizabeth Shearer; 8,965; 17.70%	James Beddome; 3,173; 6.26%	Jane MacDiarmid; 569; 1.12%	Linda Marynuk; 104; 0.21%		Jim Carr

=== 2015 ===
Electoral district	Candidates					Incumbent
Electoral district	Conservative	NDP	Liberal	Green	Other	Incumbent
Charleswood—St. James—Assiniboia— Headingley	Steven Fletcher; 18,408; 39.04%	Tom Paulley; 2,842; 6.03%	Doug Eyolfson; 24,531; 52.02%	Kevin Nichols; 1,376; 2.92%		Steven Fletcher; Charleswood—St. James—Assiniboia
Elmwood—Transcona	Lawrence Toet; 14,648; 34.00%	Daniel Blaikie; 14,709; 34.14%	Andrea Richardson-Lipon; 12,713; 29.35%	Kim Parke; 1,016; 2.36%		Lawrence Toet
Kildonan—St. Paul	Jim Bell; 17,478; 39.84%	Suzanne Hrynyk; 6,270; 14.29%	MaryAnn Mihychuk; 18,717; 42.66%	Steven Stairs; 783; 1.78%	Eduard Walter Hiebert (Ind.); 142 0.32%	Joy Smith†
Kildonan—St. Paul	Jim Bell; 17,478; 39.84%	Suzanne Hrynyk; 6,270; 14.29%	MaryAnn Mihychuk; 18,717; 42.66%	Steven Stairs; 783; 1.78%	David Reimer (CHP); 485 1.11%	Joy Smith†
Saint Boniface—Saint Vital	François Catellier; 14,005; 28.69%	Erin Selby; 5,169; 10.59%	Dan Vandal; 28,530; 58.44%	Glenn Zaretski; 1,119; 2.29%		Shelly Glover†; Saint Boniface
Winnipeg Centre	Allie Szarkiewicz; 4,189; 12.36%	Pat Martin; 9,490; 28.01%	Robert-Falcon Ouellette; 18,471; 54.51%	Don Woodstock; 1,379; 4.07%	Scott Miller (CHP); 221 0.65%	Pat Martin
Winnipeg Centre	Allie Szarkiewicz; 4,189; 12.36%	Pat Martin; 9,490; 28.01%	Robert-Falcon Ouellette; 18,471; 54.51%	Don Woodstock; 1,379; 4.07%	Darrell Rankin (Comm.); 135 0.40%	Pat Martin
Winnipeg North	Harpreet Turka; 5,193; 15.29%	Levy Abad; 4,543; 13.38%	Kevin Lamoureux; 23,402; 68.90%	John Redekopp; 826; 2.43%		Kevin Lamoureux
Winnipeg South	Gordon Giesbrecht; 16,709; 34.67%	Brianne Goertzen; 2,404; 4.99%	Terry Duguid; 28,096; 58.29%	Adam Smith; 990; 2.05%		Rod Bruinooge†
Winnipeg South Centre	Joyce Bateman; 15,102; 28.19%	Matt Henderson; 4,799; 8.96%	Jim Carr; 31,993; 59.72%	Andrew Park; 1,677; 3.13%		Joyce Bateman

=== 2011 ===
Electoral district	Candidates					Incumbent
Electoral district	Conservative	Liberal	NDP	Green	Other	Incumbent
Charleswood—St. James— Assiniboia	Steven Fletcher; 23,264; 57.56%	Rob Clement; 7,433; 18.39%	Tom Paulley; 8,134; 20.12%	Denali Enns; 1,587; 3.93%		Steven Fletcher
Elmwood—Transcona	Lawrence Toet; 15,298; 46.40%	Ilona Niemczyk; 1,660; 5.03%	Jim Maloway; 14,998; 45.49%	Ellen Young; 1,017; 3.08%		Jim Maloway
Kildonan—St. Paul	Joy Smith; 22,670; 58.16%	Victor Andres; 3,199; 8.21%	Rachelle Devine; 11,727; 30.09%	Alon David Weinberg; 1,020; 2.62%	Eduard Hiebert (Ind.); 145 0.37%	Joy Smith
Kildonan—St. Paul	Joy Smith; 22,670; 58.16%	Victor Andres; 3,199; 8.21%	Rachelle Devine; 11,727; 30.09%	Alon David Weinberg; 1,020; 2.62%	Brett Ryall (Ind.); 218 0.56%	Joy Smith
Saint Boniface	Shelly Glover; 21,737; 50.28%	Raymond Simard; 13,314; 30.80%	Patrice Miniely; 6,935; 16.04%	Marc Payette; 1,245; 2.88%		Shelly Glover
Winnipeg Centre	Bev Pitura; 7,173; 27.64%	Allan Wise; 2,872; 11.07%	Pat Martin; 13,928; 53.66%	Jacqueline Romanow; 1,830; 7.05%	Darrell Rankin (Comm.); 152; 0.59%	Pat Martin
Winnipeg North	Ann Matejicka; 6,701; 26.35%	Kevin Lamoureux; 9,097; 35.78%	Rebecca Blaikie; 9,053; 35.60%	John Harvie; 458; 1.80%	Frank Komarniski (Comm.); 118; 0.46%	Kevin Lamoureux
Winnipeg South	Rod Bruinooge; 22,840; 52.24%	Terry Duguid; 14,296; 32.70%	Dave Gaudreau; 5,693; 13.02%	Caitlyn McIntyre; 889; 2.03%		Rod Bruinooge
Winnipeg South Centre	Joyce Bateman; 15,506; 38.82%	Anita Neville; 14,784; 37.02%	Dennis Lewycky; 7,945; 19.89%	Joshua McNeil; 1,383; 3.46%	Lyndon B. Froese (Ind.); 103 0.26%	Anita Neville
Winnipeg South Centre	Joyce Bateman; 15,506; 38.82%	Anita Neville; 14,784; 37.02%	Dennis Lewycky; 7,945; 19.89%	Joshua McNeil; 1,383; 3.46%	Matt Henderson (Ind.); 218 0.55%	Anita Neville

=== 2008 ===
Electoral district	Candidates						Incumbent
Electoral district	Conservative	Liberal	NDP	Green	Christian Heritage	Other	Incumbent
Charleswood— St. James— Assiniboia	Steven Fletcher; 21,588; 53.83%	Bob Friesen; 8,514; 21.23%	Fiona Shiells; 7,190; 17.93%	Brian Timlick; 2,632; 6.56%	Mark Price; 180; 0.45%		Steven Fletcher
Elmwood—Transcona	Thomas Steen; 12,776; 40.74%	Wes Penner; 2,079; 6.63%	Jim Maloway; 14,355; 45.77%	Chris Hrynkow; 1,839; 5.86%	Robert Scott; 312; 0.99%		Bill Blaikie†
Kildonan— St. Paul	Joy Smith; 19,751; 53.40%	Lesley Hughes (Note: Lesley Hughes was on the ballot as a Liberal candidate, but was disavowed by the party.); 3,009; 8.14%	Ross Eadie; 12,093; 32.70%	Kevan Bowkett; 1,685; 4.56%	Jordan Loewen; 233; 0.63%	Eduard Hiebert (Ind.); 214; 0.58%	Joy Smith
Saint Boniface	Shelly Glover; 19,440; 46.32%	Raymond Simard; 14,728; 35.09%	Matt Schaubroeck; 5,502; 13.11%	Marc Payette; 2,104; 5.01%	Justin Gregoire; 195; 0.46%		Raymond Simard
Winnipeg Centre	Kenny Daodu; 5,437; 21.65%	Dan Hurley; 3,922; 15.62%	Pat Martin; 12,285; 48.92%	Jessie Klassen; 2,777; 11.06%		Ed Ackerman (Ind.); 135 0.54%	Pat Martin
Winnipeg Centre	Kenny Daodu; 5,437; 21.65%	Dan Hurley; 3,922; 15.62%	Pat Martin; 12,285; 48.92%	Jessie Klassen; 2,777; 11.06%		Joe Chan (Ind.); 226 0.90%	Pat Martin
Winnipeg Centre	Kenny Daodu; 5,437; 21.65%	Dan Hurley; 3,922; 15.62%	Pat Martin; 12,285; 48.92%	Jessie Klassen; 2,777; 11.06%		Lyle Morrisseau (FPNP); 212 0.84%	Pat Martin
Winnipeg Centre	Kenny Daodu; 5,437; 21.65%	Dan Hurley; 3,922; 15.62%	Pat Martin; 12,285; 48.92%	Jessie Klassen; 2,777; 11.06%		Darrell Rankin (Comm.); 119 0.47%	Pat Martin
Winnipeg North	Ray Larkin; 5,033; 22.35%	Marcelle Marion; 2,075; 9.22%	Judy Wasylycia-Leis; 14,097; 62.61%	Catherine Johannson; 1,070; 4.75%		Frank Komarniski (Comm.); 151 0.67%	Judy Wasylycia-Leis
Winnipeg North	Ray Larkin; 5,033; 22.35%	Marcelle Marion; 2,075; 9.22%	Judy Wasylycia-Leis; 14,097; 62.61%	Catherine Johannson; 1,070; 4.75%		Roger F. Poisson (PPP); 90 0.40%	Judy Wasylycia-Leis
Winnipeg South	Rod Bruinooge; 19,954; 48.84%	John Loewen; 14,221; 34.80%	Sean Robert; 4,673; 11.44%	David Cosby; 1,839; 4.50%	Heidi Loewen-Steffano; 173; 0.42%		Rod Bruinooge
Winnipeg South Centre	Trevor Kennerd; 14,103; 36.26%	Anita Neville; 16,438; 42.27%	Rachel Heinrichs; 5,490; 14.12%	Vere Scott; 2,860; 7.35%			Anita Neville

=== 2006 ===
Electoral district	Candidates					Incumbent
Electoral district	Liberal	Conservative	NDP	Green	Other	Incumbent
Charleswood—St. James— Assiniboia	John Loewen; 16,099; 36.37%	Steven Fletcher; 20,791; 46.98%	Dennis Kshyk; 5,669; 12.81%	Mike Johannson; 1,700; 3.84%		Steven Fletcher
Elmwood—Transcona	Tanya Parks; 4,108; 12.31%	Linda West; 10,720; 32.13%	Bill Blaikie; 16,967; 50.85%	Tanja Hutter; 1,211; 3.63%	Robert Scott (CHP); 363; 1.09%	Bill Blaikie
Kildonan—St. Paul	Terry Duguid; 13,597; 33.47%	Joy Smith; 17,524; 43.13%	Evelyn Myskiw; 8,193; 20.17%	Colleen Zobel; 1,101; 2.71%	Eduard Hiebert (Ind.); 213; 0.52%	Joy Smith
Saint Boniface	Raymond Simard; 16,417; 38.59%	Ken Cooper; 14,893; 35.00%	Mathieu Allard; 9,311; 21.88%	Marc Payette; 1,640; 3.85%	Jane MacDiarmid (CHP); 285; 0.67%	Raymond Simard
Winnipeg Centre	Ray St. Germain; 6,940; 24.34%	Helen Sterzer; 5,554; 19.48%	Pat Martin; 13,805; 48.43%	Gary Gervais; 2,010; 7.05%	Anna-Celestrya Carr (Comm.); 199; 0.70%	Pat Martin
Winnipeg North	Parmjeet Gill; 5,752; 21.11%	Garreth McDonald; 4,810; 17.65%	Judy Wasylycia-Leis; 15,582; 57.18%	David Carey; 779; 2.86%	Darrell Rankin (Comm.); 123 0.45%	Judy Wasylycia-Leis
Winnipeg North	Parmjeet Gill; 5,752; 21.11%	Garreth McDonald; 4,810; 17.65%	Judy Wasylycia-Leis; 15,582; 57.18%	David Carey; 779; 2.86%	Eric Truijen (CHP); 207 0.76%	Judy Wasylycia-Leis
Winnipeg South	Reg Alcock; 17,217; 41.15%	Rod Bruinooge; 17,328; 41.42%	Robert Page; 5,743; 13.73%	Wesley Owen Whiteside; 1,289; 3.08%	Heidi Loewen-Steffano (CHP); 259; 0.62%	Reg Alcock
Winnipeg South Centre	Anita Neville; 16,296; 39.25%	Michael Richards; 13,077; 31.49%	Mark Wasyliw; 9,055; 21.81%	Vere H. Scott; 1,848; 4.45%	Jeffrey Anderson (Ind.); 246 0.59%	Anita Neville
Winnipeg South Centre	Anita Neville; 16,296; 39.25%	Michael Richards; 13,077; 31.49%	Mark Wasyliw; 9,055; 21.81%	Vere H. Scott; 1,848; 4.45%	Dale Swirsky (PC); 934 2.25%	Anita Neville
Winnipeg South Centre	Anita Neville; 16,296; 39.25%	Michael Richards; 13,077; 31.49%	Mark Wasyliw; 9,055; 21.81%	Vere H. Scott; 1,848; 4.45%	Magnus Thompson (CAP); 66 0.16%	Anita Neville

=== 2004 ===
Electoral district	Candidates							Incumbent
Electoral district	Liberal	Conservative	NDP	Green	Communist	Marijuana	Other	Incumbent
Charleswood—St. James	Glen Murray; 17,954; 42.55%	Steven John Fletcher; 18,688; 44.29%	Peter Carney; 4,283; 10.15%	Andrew Basham; 880; 2.09%	Beatriz Alas; 49; 0.12%	Dan Zupansky; 337; 0.80%		Vacant (Note: John Harvard was elected Liberal MP in the Charleswood—St. James—Assiniboia riding in 2000. He resigned his seat on May 6, 2004 to be appointed Lieutenant Governor of Manitoba.); Charleswood—St. James—Assiniboia
Elmwood—Transcona	Tanya Parks; 4,923; 16.81%	Bryan McLeod; 7,644; 26.11%	Bill Blaikie; 15,221; 51.99%	Elijah Gair; 719; 2.46%	Paul Sidon; 74; 0.25%	Gavin Whittaker; 311; 1.06%	Robert Scott (CHP); 386; 1.32%	Bill Blaikie; Winnipeg—Transcona
Kildonan—St. Paul	Terry Duguid; 13,304; 36.54%	Joy Smith; 13,582; 37.30%	Lorene Mahoney; 8,202; 22.53%	Jacob Giesbrecht; 756; 2.08%		Rebecca Whittaker; 290; 0.80%	Katharine Reimer (CHP); 278; 0.76%	New district
Saint Boniface	Raymond Simard; 17,989; 46.61%	Ken Cooper; 11,956; 30.98%	Mathieu Allard; 6,954; 18.02%	Daniel Backé; 925; 2.40%	Gérard Guay; 77; 0.20%	Chris Buors; 317; 0.82%	Jeannine Moquin-Perry (CHP); 378; 0.98%	Raymond Simard
Winnipeg Centre	David Northcott; 9,285; 34.69%	Robert Eng; 3,631; 13.56%	Pat Martin; 12,149; 45.39%	Robin (Pilar) Faye; 1,151; 4.30%	Anna-Celestrya Carr; 114; 0.43%	John M. Siedleski; 346; 1.29%	Douglas Edward Schweitzer (Ind.); 92; 0.34%	Pat Martin
Winnipeg North	Rey D. Pagtakhan; 9,491; 36.55%	Kris Stevenson; 3,186; 12.27%	Judy Wasylycia-Leis; 12,507; 2.04%	Darrell Rankin; 111; 0.43%			Eric Truijen (CHP); 141; 0.54%	Rey Pagtakhan; Winnipeg North—St. Paul
Winnipeg North	Rey D. Pagtakhan; 9,491; 36.55%	Kris Stevenson; 3,186; 12.27%	Judy Wasylycia-Leis; 12,507; 2.04%	Darrell Rankin; 111; 0.43%			Eric Truijen (CHP); 141; 0.54%	merged district
Winnipeg North	Rey D. Pagtakhan; 9,491; 36.55%	Kris Stevenson; 3,186; 12.27%	Judy Wasylycia-Leis; 12,507; 2.04%	Darrell Rankin; 111; 0.43%			Eric Truijen (CHP); 141; 0.54%	Judy Wasylycia-Leis; Winnipeg North Centre
Winnipeg South	Reg Alcock; 19,270; 51.31%	Rod Bruinooge; 12,770; 34.00%	Catherine Green; 4,217; 11.23%	Ron Cameron; 1,003; 2.67%			Jane MacDiarmid (CHP); 296; 0.79%	Reg Alcock
Winnipeg South Centre	Anita Neville; 18,133; 46.60%	Raj Joshi; 10,516; 27.02%	James Allum; 8,270; 21.25%	Ian Scott; 1,508; 3.88%	Andrew Dalgliesh; 81; 0.21%	Andy Caisse; 293; 0.75%	Magnus Thompson (CAP); 114; 0.29%	Anita Neville

=== 2000 ===
Electoral district	Candidates						Incumbent
Electoral district	Liberal	Canadian Alliance	NDP	PC	Communist	Other	Incumbent
Charleswood—St. James—Assiniboia	John Harvard; 13,901; 36.21%	Cyril McFate; 11,569; 30.14%	Dennis Kshyk; 2,786; 7.26%	Curtis Moore; 9,991; 26.03%	Greg Crowe; 138; 0.36%		John Harvard; Charleswood—Assiniboine
Saint Boniface	Ronald J. Duhamel; 20,173; 52.17%	Joyce M. Chilton; 8,962; 23.18%	John Parry; 5,026; 13.00%	Mike Reilly; 4,505; 11.65%			Ron Duhamel
Winnipeg Centre	Kevin Lamoureux; 9,310; 34.11%	Reg Smith; 3,975; 14.56%	Pat Martin; 11,263; 41.26%	Michel Allard; 1,915; 7.02%	Harold Dyck; 134; 0.49%	Mikel Magnusson (Green); 698; 2.56%	Pat Martin
Winnipeg North Centre	Mary Richard; 6,755; 27.47%		Judy Wasylycia-Leis; 14,356; 58.39%	Myron Troniak; 2,950; 12.00%	Darrell Rankin; 525; 2.14%		Judy Wasylycia-Leis
Winnipeg North—St. Paul	Rey D. Pagtakhan; 14,556; 38.78%	Trevor Sprague; 11,412; 30.40%	Roman Yereniuk; 7,931; 21.13%	Dave Vust; 2,959; 7.88%	Paul Sidon; 110; 0.29%	Cynthia Cooke (CAP); 208 0.55%	Rey Pagtakhan
Winnipeg North—St. Paul	Rey D. Pagtakhan; 14,556; 38.78%	Trevor Sprague; 11,412; 30.40%	Roman Yereniuk; 7,931; 21.13%	Dave Vust; 2,959; 7.88%	Paul Sidon; 110; 0.29%	Georgina Rhéaume (Green); 232 0.62%	Rey Pagtakhan
Winnipeg North—St. Paul	Rey D. Pagtakhan; 14,556; 38.78%	Trevor Sprague; 11,412; 30.40%	Roman Yereniuk; 7,931; 21.13%	Dave Vust; 2,959; 7.88%	Paul Sidon; 110; 0.29%	Eric Truijen (NA); 126 0.34%	Rey Pagtakhan
Winnipeg South	Reg Alcock; 21,433; 50.94%	Bill Hancock; 12,638; 30.04%	Duane Nicol; 4,224; 10.04%	Geoffrey Lambert; 3,599; 8.55%		Didz Zuzens (Ind.); 183; 0.43%	Reg Alcock
Winnipeg South Centre	Anita Neville; 15,231; 40.46%	Betty Granger; 3,210; 8.53%	James Allum; 7,501; 19.93%	David Newman; 10,675; 28.36%	David Allison; 181; 0.48%	Chris Buors (Mar.); 640 1.70%	Lloyd Axworthy†
Winnipeg South Centre	Anita Neville; 15,231; 40.46%	Betty Granger; 3,210; 8.53%	James Allum; 7,501; 19.93%	David Newman; 10,675; 28.36%	David Allison; 181; 0.48%	Magnus Thompson (CAP); 202 0.54%	Lloyd Axworthy†
Winnipeg—Transcona	Bret Dobbin; 6,041; 18.43%	Shawn Rattai; 8,336; 25.44%	Bill Blaikie; 15,680; 47.85%	Chris Brewer; 2,133; 6.51%	James Hogaboam; 87; 0.27%	Theresa Ducharme (Ind.); 118 0.36%	Bill Blaikie
Winnipeg—Transcona	Bret Dobbin; 6,041; 18.43%	Shawn Rattai; 8,336; 25.44%	Bill Blaikie; 15,680; 47.85%	Chris Brewer; 2,133; 6.51%	James Hogaboam; 87; 0.27%	C. David Nickarz (Green); 229 0.70%	Bill Blaikie
Winnipeg—Transcona	Bret Dobbin; 6,041; 18.43%	Shawn Rattai; 8,336; 25.44%	Bill Blaikie; 15,680; 47.85%	Chris Brewer; 2,133; 6.51%	James Hogaboam; 87; 0.27%	Robert Scott (NA); 146 0.45%	Bill Blaikie

=== 1997 ===
Electoral district	Candidates					Incumbent
Electoral district	Liberal	NDP	Reform	PC	Other	Incumbent
Charleswood—Assiniboine	John Harvard; 15,925	Rupert Forde; 3,923	Cyril Mcfate; 8,398	Felix Holtmann; 8,664	154	John Harvard; Winnipeg—St. James
Saint Boniface	Ron Duhamel; 18,948	Peter Carney; 6,663	Denis Simard; 6,658	Jennifer Clark; 4,555	171	Ron Duhamel; St. Boniface
Winnipeg Centre	David Walker; 9,895	Pat Martin; 10,979	Reginald A. Smith; 3,095	Campbell Alexander; 2,442	436	New riding
Winnipeg North Centre	Judy Opitz Silver; 7,801	Judy Wasylycia-Leis; 13,663	Mike Wiens; 3,678	Marni Larkin; 1,742	297	David Walker
Winnipeg North—St. Paul	Rey Pagtakhan; 13,524	Roman Yereniuk; 9,487	Terry Lewis; 7,108	George Wall; 5,430	534	Rey Pagtakhan; Winnipeg North
Winnipeg South	Reg Alcock; 18,800	Iris Taylor; 4,629	Greg Yost; 7,510	Bill Mackness; 6,547	438	Reg Alcock
Winnipeg South Centre	Lloyd Axworthy; 20,006	Sara Malabar; 5,717	Gary Hollingshead; 4,457	Andrea Rolstone; 5,011	606	Lloyd Axworthy
Winnipeg—Transcona	Rosemary Broadbent; 7,105	Bill Blaikie; 16,640	Helen Sterzer; 5,703	Glenn Buffie; 2,968	688	Bill Blaikie
