= Strangers (Parliament of the United Kingdom) =

Non-parliamentary person present at a parliament

The term stranger is the traditional way of referring to someone physically present in the Palace of Westminster who is neither a member of parliament nor a parliamentary official. In 2004, a motion was approved implementing the recommendation of the Modernisation Committee that the term stranger no longer be used and be replaced with either member of the public or the public, although Standing Order No. 13, paragraph 1 of the House of Lords still mentions strangers to this present day.

Nowadays, visitors can watch debates, and can sit in the Strangers' Gallery. Historically, visitors were not allowed in at all. Parliament still has the right to debate in private, and any visitor causing a disturbance can be ejected, or even taken into custody by the Serjeant at Arms. The House of Commons rarely goes into private session (the last occasion being on 4 December 2001 when it was debating the Anti-Terrorism, Crime and Security Bill), and although much routine business is handled by select committees, second reading and third reading and usually attracts little attention, most main debates are public. Although BBC Parliament now broadcasts from the main debating chambers of both the House of Commons and House of Lords, as well as from important committees which may meet outside the chambers, it must turn off sound transmission during divisions.

Attempts to exclude visitors are usually employed simply to disrupt or delay the House's proceedings, a kind of filibustering. An MP wishing to interrupt used to shout "I spy strangers!" The Speaker then immediately put the motion "That strangers do now withdraw", as a point of order. If the motion was carried, the public galleries were cleared – this could (but rarely did) include the press gallery and Hansard; broadcast television and radio stops, and business continues in private. This was Standing Order No. 163 of the House. It has been amended as part of modernisation of Commons business, but the principle remains much the same.

On 27 April 1875, the Irish Nationalist MP Joseph Biggar caused the Prince of Wales (later King Edward VII) to be removed from the viewing gallery using this method.

During the English Civil War William Lenthall, the Speaker, essentially recognized the King only as a stranger, and not entitled to be in the chamber. He said, on being interrogated in the Commons by the king: "May it please your Majesty, I have neither eyes to see nor tongue to speak in this place but as the House is pleased to direct me, whose servant I am here."

To this day, the reigning monarch of the United Kingdom is not allowed entry to the House of Commons. At the State Opening of Parliament the monarch, through his or her servant Black Rod, summons the members of the House of Commons to the House of Lords; the door of the Commons is slammed shut and they must knock on it to request entry. The same tradition is preserved in Canada, where the Members of Parliament are summoned to the Senate Chamber at the State Opening of Parliament by the Governor General; similarly in Australia; and in New Zealand, where members of the House of Representatives are summoned to the chamber of the Legislative Council, although the Legislative Council abolished itself in 1951.

== See also ==
- Strangers' Bar
- Stranger to the House (Canada)
