= Visitors' Gallery =

Part of the British House of Commons

Coordinates: 51.4997°N 0.1244°W

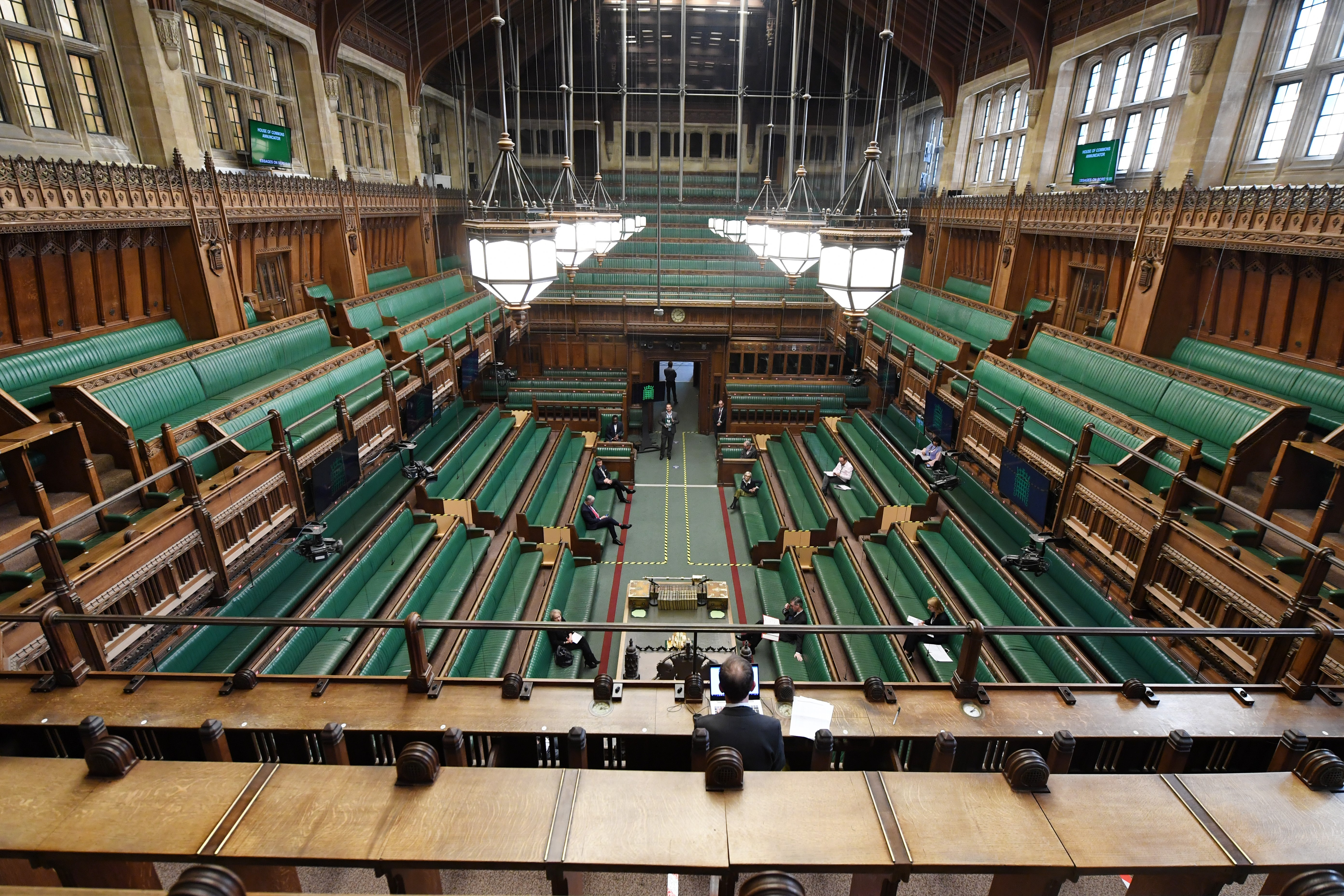
View from the Press Gallery above the Speaker's chair, looking towards the Public Gallery located above the entrance to the chamber

The Visitors' Gallery, formerly known as the Strangers' Gallery, is set aside for members of the public at the British House of Commons, and is intended for both invited and uninvited members of the public to watch the proceedings of the House. A similar gallery exists in the House of Lords.

The gallery of the House of Commons is located on a level above the floor of the Commons chamber and looks down on it. The section of the gallery above the Speaker's chair is reserved for members of the press, while the area set aside for members of the general public is situated above the entrance to the chamber. There is a glass screen at the front of the public area of the gallery to prevent the throwing of objects into the chamber, which was installed in April 2004 at the cost of £600,000.

Members of the public may obtain tickets from their Member of Parliament. It is possible to queue outside St Stephen's Tower and be admitted to the gallery without booking, especially on Fridays, however during popular debates it will be nearly impossible to obtain a place without booking. The former name "Stranger's Gallery" refers to the traditional use of the term strangers to refer to those present in Parliament that are neither members nor staff.

Other parliaments throughout the Commonwealth have similar facilities, which are known by the same terms.

== See also ==
- Strangers' Bar
