= Stranger to the House =

In the House of Commons of Canada and its provinces' Legislative Assemblies (and possibly other Westminster systems), a Stranger to the House is anyone permitted to be on the floor of the House who is not either a Member of Parliament, an Officer of the House (such as the clerks or the Sergeant-at-Arms) or a parliamentary page.

The position was created at the federal level following the 2004 federal election when a Winnipeg district elected a quadriplegic candidate, Conservative Steven Fletcher, who requires the constant presence of an aide to provide personal care and assist in his duties.

Fletcher's assistant is the first (and so far only) adult Stranger to the House to be permitted on the Commons floor while the House is in session.

In addition, MPs have brought their infant children into the Chamber on several occasions. A ruling by the Speaker on February 16, 2012, clarified that members may bring their infants into the Chamber provided it does not cause a disruption.

On other occasions, when it has been desired to admit guests to the House of Commons during proceedings, this has been accomplished by converting the sitting of the House into a Committee of the Whole, which is entitled to receive guests and to offer them the opportunity to speak in response to the comments of members.

== See also ==
- Strangers (Parliament of the United Kingdom)
