= Winnipeg West (federal electoral district) =

Federal electoral district in Manitoba, Canada

Coordinates: 49.869°N 97.325°W

Manitoba electoral district
- Interactive map of riding boundaries from the 2025 federal election

Federal electoral district
- Legislature: House of Commons
MP
Doug Eyolfson
Liberal
- District created: 1996
- First contested: 1997
- Last contested: 2025
- District webpage: profile, map

Demographics
- Population (2021): 84,767
- Electors (2021): 65,423
- Area (km²): 204.85
- Pop. density (per km²): 413.8
- Census division: Division No. 11
- Census subdivision(s): Winnipeg (part), Headingley, Rosser

Winnipeg West (French: Winnipeg-Ouest; formerly known as Charleswood—St. James—Assiniboia—Headingley) is a federal electoral district in Manitoba, Canada, that has been represented in the House of Commons of Canada since 1997.

Following the 2022 Canadian federal electoral redistribution, this riding was renamed for the 2025 Canadian federal election. It gained the Rural Municipality of Rosser from Selkirk—Interlake—Eastman and the Winnipeg suburb of Tuxedo from Winnipeg South Centre.

Its current Member of Parliament is Doug Eyolfson of the Liberal Party of Canada, who was first elected in 2015. He was defeated by Marty Morantz of the Conservative Party of Canada in 2019 and 2021, but regained his seat in 2025 after a third consecutive match with Morantz.

== Demographics ==
According to the 2021 Canadian census

- Ethnic groups: 75.4% White, 11.3% Indigenous, 4.2% Filipino, 2.4% South Asian, 2.1% Black, 1.1% Chinese
- Languages: 83% English, 2.1% Tagalog, 1.5% French, 1.3% German, 1.1 Russian
- Religions (2021): 52.2% Christian (19.1% Catholic, 7.9% United Church, 4.8% Anglican, 2.9% Lutheran, 1.6% Christian Orthodox, 1.3% Anabaptist, 1.2% Baptist), 42.6% No religion, 1.3% Muslim, 1.2% Jewish, 1% Sikh
- Median income (2020): $46,000
- Average income (2020): $57,050

Panethnic groups in Charleswood—St. James—Assiniboia—Headingley (2011−2021)
Panethnic group	2021		2016		2011	
Panethnic group	Pop.	%	Pop.	%	Pop.	%
European (Note: Statistic includes all persons that did not make up part of a visible minority or an indigenous identity.)	62,090	75.46%	64,190	80%	67,785	85.14%
Indigenous	9,285	11.28%	7,880	9.82%	6,105	7.67%
Southeast Asian (Note: Statistic includes total responses of "Filipino" and "Southeast Asian" under visible minority section on census.)	3,875	4.71%	2,870	3.58%	1,200	1.51%
South Asian	1,985	2.41%	1,400	1.74%	1,120	1.41%
African	1,740	2.11%	1,380	1.72%	1,380	1.73%
East Asian (Note: Statistic includes total responses of "Chinese", "Korean", and "Japanese" under visible minority section on census.)	1,405	1.71%	1,165	1.45%	1,170	1.47%
Middle Eastern (Note: Statistic includes total responses of "West Asian" and "Arab" under visible minority section on census.)	650	0.79%	430	0.54%	265	0.33%
Latin American	575	0.7%	455	0.57%	300	0.38%
Other/multiracial (Note: Statistic includes total responses of "Visible minority, n.i.e." and "Multiple visible minorities" under visible minority section on census.)	665	0.81%	470	0.59%	290	0.36%
Total responses	82,280	97.07%	80,240	97.17%	79,615	97.25%
Total population	84,767	100%	82,574	100%	81,864	100%
Notes: Totals greater than 100% due to multiple origin responses. Demographics based on 2012 Canadian federal electoral redistribution riding boundaries.

== History ==
The riding was created in 1996 as "Charleswood—Assiniboine" from the Winnipeg—St. James riding.

In 1998, it was renamed "Charleswood—St. James—Assiniboia".

In 2003, it was abolished, but the entire district was transferred to "Charleswood—St. James", and small parts of Winnipeg Centre and Winnipeg South Centre were added.

In 2004, it was renamed "Charleswood—St. James—Assiniboia".

In 2015, it was renamed Charleswood—St. James—Assiniboia—Headingley but there was no boundary changes following the 2012 Canadian federal electoral redistribution.

In 2025, this riding was renamed Winnipeg West following the 2022 Canadian federal electoral redistribution. It gained the Rural Municipality of Rosser from Selkirk—Interlake—Eastman and the suburb of Tuxedo from Winnipeg South Centre.

=== Members of Parliament ===
Parliament	Years	Member	Party
Charleswood—Assiniboine; Riding created from Winnipeg—St. James and Winnipeg South
36th	1997–2000	John Harvard	Liberal
Charleswood—St. James—Assiniboia
37th	2000–2004	John Harvard	Liberal
Charleswood—St. James
38th	2004–2006	Steven Fletcher	Conservative
Charleswood—St. James—Assiniboia
39th	2006–2008	Steven Fletcher	Conservative
40th	2008–2011	Steven Fletcher	Conservative
41st	2011–2015	Steven Fletcher	Conservative
Charleswood—St. James—Assiniboia—Headingley
42nd	2015–2019	Doug Eyolfson	Liberal
43rd	2019–2021	Marty Morantz	Conservative
44th	2021–2025	Marty Morantz	Conservative
Winnipeg West
45th	2025–present	Doug Eyolfson	Liberal

== Election results ==
Graph of election results in Charleswood—St. James—Assiniboia—Headingley (minor parties that never got 2% of the vote or didn't run consistently are omitted) View source data.

=== Winnipeg West, 2025–present ===
2025 Canadian federal election
** Preliminary results — Not yet official **
Party	Candidate	Votes	%	±%	Expenditures
Liberal	Doug Eyolfson	30,275	54.42	+15.18	
Conservative	Marty Morantz	22,669	40.75	+0.40	
New Democratic	Avery Selby-Lyons	2,248	4.04	–10.87	
Green	Dennis Bayomi	444	0.80	–1.26	
Total valid votes/expense limit					
Total rejected ballots					
Turnout		55,636	75.86		
Eligible voters		73,515			
Liberal notional gain from Conservative		Swing		+7.39	
Source: Elections Canada

2021 federal election redistributed results
Party	Vote	%
Conservative	20,382	40.35
Liberal	19,824	39.24
New Democratic	7,533	14.91
People's	1,727	3.42
Green	1,042	2.06
Others	8	0.02

=== Charleswood—St. James—Assiniboia—Headingley, 2015–2025 ===
2021 Canadian federal election: Charleswood—St. James—Assiniboia—Headingley
Party	Candidate	Votes	%	±%	Expenditures
Conservative	Marty Morantz	18,111	40.0	-0.7	$97,370.69
Liberal	Doug Eyolfson	17,651	39.0	+3.5	$79,799.09
New Democratic	Madelaine Dwyer	6,974	15.4	+1.2	$0.00
People's	Angela Van Hussen	1,594	3.5	-0.8	$417.99
Green	Vanessa Parks	947	2.1	-2.6	$0.00
Total valid votes/expense limit		45,277	99.4	–	$104,740.13
Total rejected ballots		296	0.6		
Turnout		45,573	69.7		
Eligible voters		65,423			
Conservative hold		Swing		-2.1	
Source: Elections Canada

2019 Canadian federal election: Charleswood—St. James—Assiniboia—Headingley
Party	Candidate	Votes	%	±%	Expenditures
Conservative	Marty Morantz	18,815	40.7	+1.66	$96,689.75
Liberal	Doug Eyolfson	16,398	35.5	-16.52	$75,789.03
New Democratic	Ken St. George	6,556	14.2	+8.17	none listed
Green	Kristin Lauhn-Jensen	2,178	4.7	+1.78	$0.00
People's	Steven Fletcher	1,975	4.3	–	none listed
Christian Heritage	Melissa Penner	166	0.4	–	none listed
Independent	Brian Ho	140	0.3	–	none listed
Total valid votes/expense limit		46,228	100.0		
Total rejected ballots		256			
Turnout		46,484	71.1		
Eligible voters		65,375			
Conservative gain from Liberal		Swing		+9.13	
Source: Elections Canada

2015 Canadian federal election
Party	Candidate	Votes	%	±%	Expenditures
Liberal	Doug Eyolfson	24,531	52.02	+33.63	–
Conservative	Steven Fletcher	18,408	39.04	-18.52	–
New Democratic	Tom Paulley	2,842	6.03	-14.10	–
Green	Kevin Nichols	1,376	2.92	-1.01	–
Total valid votes/Expense limit		47,157	99.59		$197,421.64
Total rejected ballots		195	0.41	–	
Turnout		47,352	74.61	–	
Eligible voters		63,466			
Liberal gain from Conservative		Swing		+26.08	
Source: Elections Canada

=== Charleswood—St. James—Assiniboia, 2004–2015 ===
2011 Canadian federal election
Party	Candidate	Votes	%	±%	Expenditures
Conservative	Steven Fletcher	23,264	57.56	+3.73	–
New Democratic	Tom Paulley	8,134	20.12	+2.20	–
Liberal	Rob Clement	7,433	18.39	-2.84	–
Green	Denali Enns	1,587	3.93	-2.64	–
Total valid votes/Expense limit		40,418	99.67		–
Total rejected ballots		135	0.33	-0.01	
Turnout		40,553	64.77	+1.41	
Eligible voters		62,609	–	–	
Conservative hold		Swing		+0.77	

2008 Canadian federal election
Party	Candidate	Votes	%	±%	Expenditures
Conservative	Steven Fletcher	21,588	53.83	+6.86	$69,196
Liberal	Bob Friesen	8,514	21.22	-15.15	$32,010
New Democratic	Fiona Shiells	7,190	17.92	+5.12	$14,322
Green	Brian Timlick	2,632	6.56	+2.72	$2,383
Christian Heritage	Mark Price	180	0.44	–	–
Total valid votes/Expense limit		40,104	100.00		$78,841
Total rejected ballots		136	0.34	-0.01	
Turnout		40,240	63.36	-6.03	

2006 Canadian federal election
Party	Candidate	Votes	%	±%	Expenditures
Conservative	Steven Fletcher	20,791	46.97	+2.7	$71,903
Liberal	John Loewen	16,099	36.37	-6.2	$68,104
New Democratic	Dennis Kshyk	5,669	12.80	+2.7	$1,977
Green	Michael Johannson	1,700	3.84	+1.7	$397.50
Total valid votes		44,259	100.00		–
Total rejected ballots		157	0.35	+0.1	
Turnout		44,416	69.39	+3.9	

=== Charleswood—St. James, 2003–2004 ===
2004 Canadian federal election
Party	Candidate	Votes	%	±%	Expenditures
Conservative	Steven Fletcher	18,688	44.3	-11.9	$71,182
Liberal	Glen Murray	17,954	42.6	+6.3	$71,685
New Democratic	Peter Carney	4,283	10.2	+2.9	$6,030
Green	Andrew Basham	880	2.1	–	$1,061
Marijuana	Dan Zupansky	337	0.8	–	–
Communist	Beatriz Alas	49	0.1	-0.2	$654
Total valid votes		42,191	100.0		–
Total rejected ballots		109	0.3	0.0	
Turnout		42,300	65.5	-1.6	

Note: Conservative vote is compared to the total of the Canadian Alliance vote and Progressive Conservative vote in 2000 election.

=== Charleswood St. James—Assiniboia, 1998–2003 ===
2000 Canadian federal election
Party	Candidate	Votes	%	±%	Expenditures
Liberal	John Harvard	13,901	36.2	-6.8	$56,399
Alliance	Cyril McFate	11,569	30.1	+7.5	$51,131
Progressive Conservative	Curtis Moore	9,991	26.0	+2.7	$18,126
New Democratic	Dennis Kshyk	2,786	7.3	-3.3	$1,741
Communist	Greg Crowe	138	0.4	–	$287
Total valid votes		38,385	100.0		–
Total rejected ballots		89	0.2	-0.1	
Turnout		38,474	67.0	-0.6	

Note: Canadian Alliance vote is compared to the Reform vote in 1997 election.

=== Charleswood—Assiniboine, 1996–1998 ===
1997 Canadian federal election: Charleswood—Assiniboine
Party	Candidate	Votes	%	Expenditures
Liberal	John Harvard	15,925	43.0	$37,585
Progressive Conservative	Felix Holtmann	8,664	23.4	$51,089
Reform	Cyril McFate	8,398	22.7	$21,501
New Democratic	Rupert Forde	3,923	10.6	$1,850
Marxist–Leninist	Mary Stanley	154	0.4	$11
Total valid votes		37,064	100.0	
Total rejected ballots		262	0.4	
Turnout		37,326	67.6	
History of Federal Ridings since 1867: CHARLESWOOD--ASSINIBOINE, Manitoba (1996 - 1998), Library of Parliament, Parliament of Canada. Retrieved 26 January 2010.

== See also ==
- List of Canadian electoral districts
- Historical federal electoral districts of Canada
