= Strangers' Bar =

Bar in the Palace of Westminster

Coordinates: 51°29′59″N 0°7′27″W

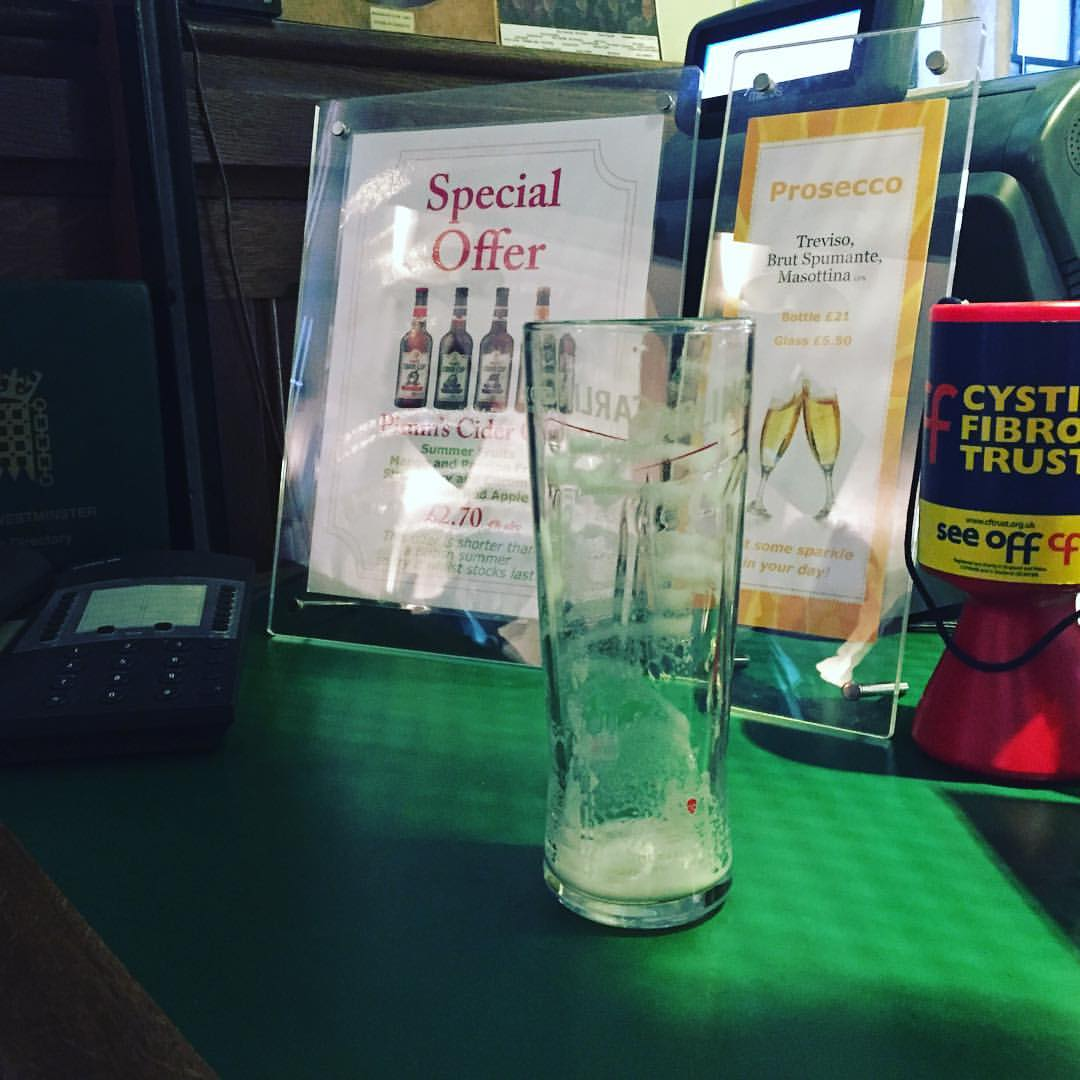
The bartop in the Strangers' Bar

The Strangers' Bar is one of several bars in the Palace of Westminster, the home of the Parliament of the United Kingdom, situated near the House of Commons. It is open to Members of Parliament and officers of Parliament, their guests, and members of parliamentary staff. The bar often sells ales and other beverages from small breweries across the UK. The bar was historically nicknamed the Kremlin due to its popularity with Labour MPs while Conservatives preferred The Smoking Room. This preference has been credited to the bar more closely resembling a northern working men's club, including serving the same beers, than anywhere else in Westminster. Parliamentary privilege means that the bar does not require an alcohol licence.

Smoking was banned in the bar from 4 April 2005. In 2013 the bar underwent a £13,000 refit. In 2018 it had a dartboard and served pork scratchings.

On 22 February 2012, the bar was the scene of an incident involving Labour MP Eric Joyce, who hit several MPs and councillors during an altercation. He headbutted Conservative MP Stuart Andrew, hit Conservative councillors Luke Mackenzie and Ben Maney, and assaulted fellow Labour MP Phil Wilson. Conservative MPs Jackie Doyle-Price, Alec Shelbrooke and Andrew Percy were also involved. Police were called to attend, and Joyce pleaded guilty to four charges, including one of assault by beating. He was given a fine, a 12-month community order and was ordered to pay £1,400 in compensation to his victims. In a Commons statement, Joyce apologised for his behaviour. Following his suspension from Labour, Joyce announced he was standing down as an MP.

In the financial year 2013/2014 Strangers' Bar, unlike most places in the Commons that serve alcohol, turned a profit on its takings of £202,575.

In 2024 the Independent Complaints and Grievance Scheme found that the conservative MP Aaron Bell had touched a woman on her left thigh, waist and bottom inappropriately and without her consent while in the bar in December 2023. Also in 2024 the House of Lords Conduct Committee found that Lord Ranger of Northwood had harassed a group of people in the Strangers' Bar in January of that year.

In January 2025 the bar was closed for a review of security and safety procedures after a report of drink spiking. By 11 February 2025 plans were in place to reopen it with CCTV, more security guards and additional staff training. The reopening took place on 24 February 2025. In November 2025 a guest of Andrew Rosindell got into a dispute with the bar doorman which resulted in the police being called.

== Access ==
In 2017 the bar was open to MPs, House of Commons staff grade B or above, senior civil service members of Office of Parliamentary Counsel and former MPs who were either peers or had sat in parliament for at least 10 years. It was also open to retired House of Commons staff if they were previously band A3 and above and had worked there for 30 or more years. The Trade Union Side Administrator and Staff News Editor could be served if they were there on official duties. MPs could bring up to three guests with the proviso that only the MP can purchase drinks.

When parliament was not sitting the bar was open to all House of Commons staff.

In February 2025 the bar was limited to no more than 50 people at a time.

== See also ==
- Strangers' Gallery
