= Marty Morantz =

Canadian politician (born 1962)

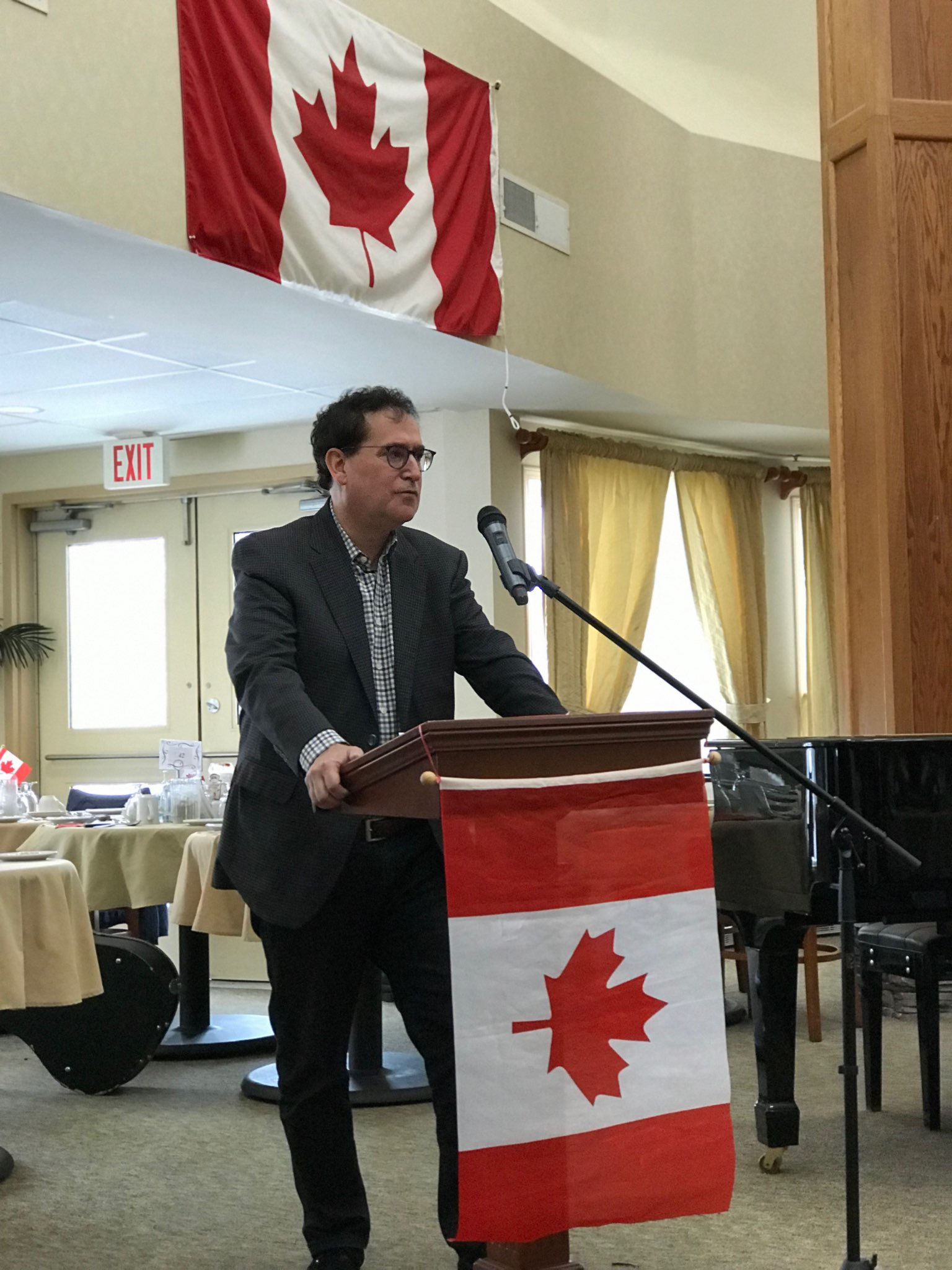

Member of Parliament for Charleswood—St. James—Assiniboia—Headingley
- In office October 21, 2019 – April 28, 2025
- Preceded by: Doug Eyolfson
- Succeeded by: Doug Eyolfson

Winnipeg City Councillor for Charleswood-Tuxedo-Whyte Ridge
- In office October 22, 2014 – October 24, 2018
- Preceded by: Paula Havixbeck
- Succeeded by: Kevin Klein

Personal details
- Born: April 7, 1962 (age 64) Winnipeg, Manitoba, Canada
- Party: Conservative
- Education: University of Manitoba (BA); Osgoode Hall Law School (LLB)
- Profession: Lawyer; politician

Martin B. "Marty" Morantz (born April 7, 1962) is a Canadian politician, best known for being the Conservative Member of Parliament in the House of Commons of Canada, representing the riding of Charleswood—St. James—Assiniboia—Headingley from 2019 until his defeat in 2025. Morantz is also a lawyer, businessperson, and philanthropist.

Prior to serving in the House of Commons, Morantz served as city councillor for the Charleswood-Tuxedo-Whyte Ridge ward on Winnipeg City Council from 2014 to 2018 after his win in the 2014 Winnipeg municipal election. During his time on City Council, Morantz chaired both the Finance and Infrastructure committees and also served on the Executive Policy Committee.

In 2011, Morantz secured the Progressive Conservative Party of Manitoba nomination in River Heights. He ran in the 2011 Manitoba general election against incumbent, the then Manitoba Liberal Party leader, Jon Gerrard. He won more than eight percentage points more than the party's candidate in the riding had won in the 2007 provincial election but he came second to Gerrard.

== Early life and education ==
Morantz earned a Bachelor of Arts in Political Studies at the University of Manitoba. Following this, he attended Osgoode Hall at York University in Toronto to acquire his law degree. He spent twenty-three years as a partner at a downtown Winnipeg law firm.

In 2009, Morantz became president of Jernat Investments Ltd., a property investment and financial services firm with holdings primarily in multi-unit apartment buildings.

Morantz has also served on the boards of many community groups, including those focused on autism advocacy and research, assisted living, and numerous groups in the Jewish community.

== Political career ==
Morantz has served as a member of the Canadian House of Commons Standing Committee on Foreign Affairs and International Development and the House of Commons Standing Committee on Finance. In 2020, he served as the Conservative Shadow Minister for National Revenue, focused on CRA-related matters.

In September 2020, Morantz became a member of the multipartisan Interparliamentary Task Force on Combatting Online Antisemitism with elected officials from other countries across the world.

In November 2020, Morantz introduced Bill C-256, the Supporting Canadian Charities Act. This bill amends the Income Tax Act by providing a similar tax treatment to privately held shares or real estate as is currently given to public shares when the proceeds are donated to a charitable organization. Estimates project this legislation would generate up to $200 million per year in donations, and is widely supported by charitable organizations from across Canada.

== Electoral record ==
=== Federal ===
2025 Canadian federal election: Winnipeg West
** Preliminary results — Not yet official **
Party	Candidate	Votes	%	±%	Expenditures
Liberal	Doug Eyolfson	30,275	54.42	+15.18	
Conservative	Marty Morantz	22,669	40.75	+0.40	
New Democratic	Avery Selby-Lyons	2,248	4.04	–10.87	
Green	Dennis Bayomi	444	0.80	–1.26	
Total valid votes/expense limit					
Total rejected ballots					
Turnout		55,636	75.86		
Eligible voters		73,515			
Liberal notional gain from Conservative		Swing		+7.39	
Source: Elections Canada

2021 Canadian federal election: Charleswood—St. James—Assiniboia—Headingley
Party	Candidate	Votes	%	±%	Expenditures
Conservative	Marty Morantz	18,111	40.0	-0.7	$97,370.69
Liberal	Doug Eyolfson	17,651	39.0	+3.5	$79,799.09
New Democratic	Madelaine Dwyer	6,974	15.4	+1.2	$0.00
People's	Angela Van Hussen	1,594	3.5	-0.8	$417.99
Green	Vanessa Parks	947	2.1	-2.6	$0.00
Total valid votes/expense limit		45,277	99.4	–	$104,740.13
Total rejected ballots		296	0.6		
Turnout		45,573	69.7		
Eligible voters		65,423			
Conservative hold		Swing		-2.1	
Source: Elections Canada

2019 Canadian federal election: Charleswood—St. James—Assiniboia—Headingley
Party	Candidate	Votes	%	±%	Expenditures
Conservative	Marty Morantz	18,815	40.7	+1.66	$96,689.75
Liberal	Doug Eyolfson	16,398	35.5	-16.52	$75,789.03
New Democratic	Ken St. George	6,556	14.2	+8.17	none listed
Green	Kristin Lauhn-Jensen	2,178	4.7	+1.78	$0.00
People's	Steven Fletcher	1,975	4.3	–	none listed
Christian Heritage	Melissa Penner	166	0.4	–	none listed
Independent	Brian Ho	140	0.3	–	none listed
Total valid votes/expense limit		46,228	100.0		
Total rejected ballots		256			
Turnout		46,484	71.1		
Eligible voters		65,375			
Conservative gain from Liberal		Swing		+9.13	
Source: Elections Canada

=== Municipal ===
Charleswood-Tuxedo
Candidate	Votes	%
Marty Morantz	6,281	34.94
Evan Duncan	5,812	32.33
Luc Lewandoski	2,950	16.41
Nadine Stiller	1,956	10.88
Kevin Nichols	978	5.44

=== Provincial ===
2011 Manitoba general election: River Heights
Party	Candidate	Votes	%	±%	Expenditures
Liberal	Jon Gerrard	4,742	45.91	−5.15	$35,683.03
Progressive Conservative	Marty Morantz	3,384	32.76	+7.65	$37,469.17
New Democratic	Dan Manning	1,835	17.76	−2.01	$10,119.45
Green	Elizabeth May Cameron	370	3.57	−0.48	$498.55
Total valid votes		10,358			
Rejected and declined votes		29			
Turnout		10,387	72.51	+3.17	
Electors on the lists		14,325			
Source: Elections Manitoba
