= Doug Eyolfson =

Canadian politician

Doug Eyolfson MP M.D. FRCPC
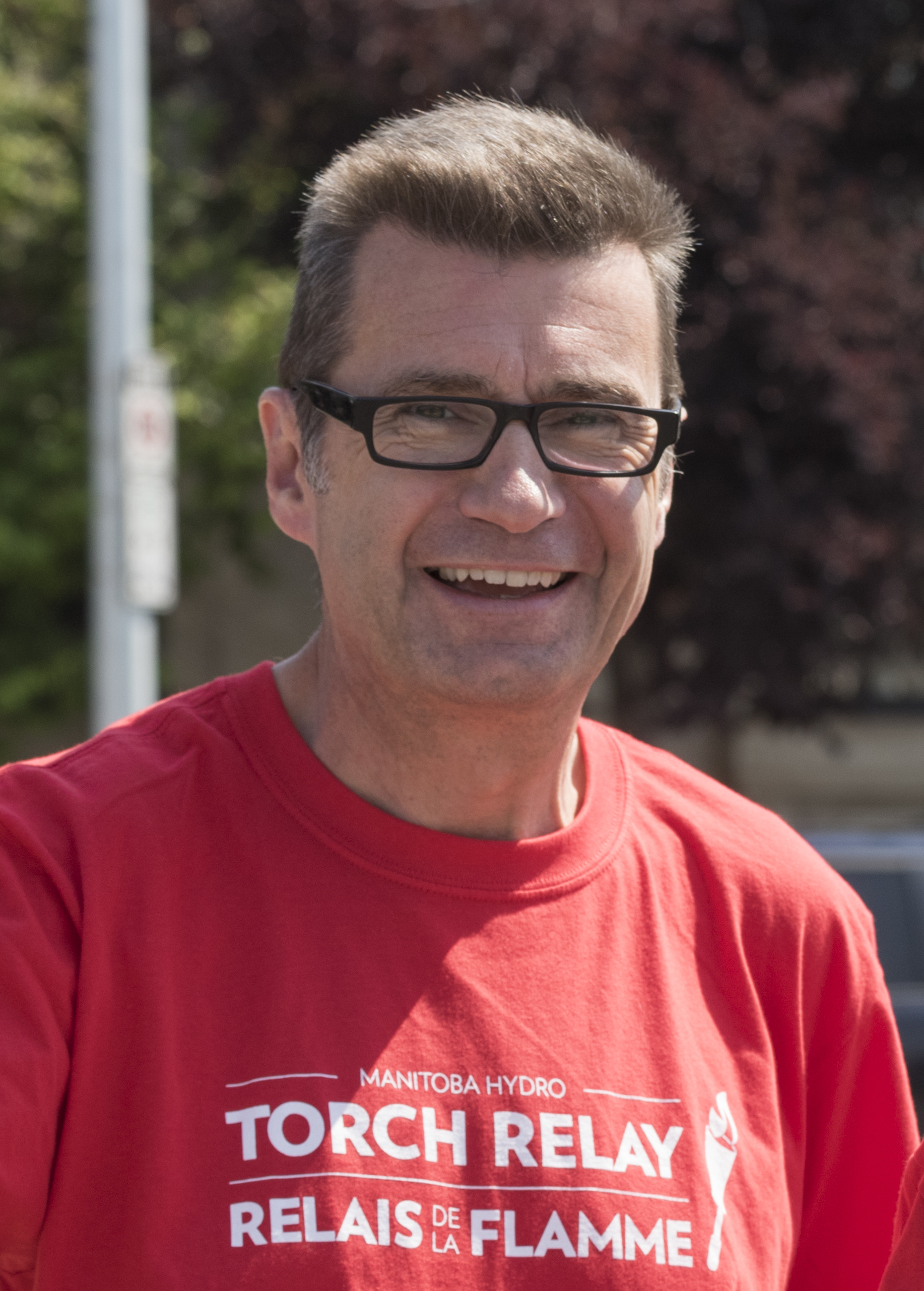

Member of Parliament for Winnipeg West Charleswood—St. James—Assiniboia—Headingley (2015–2019)
- Incumbent
- Assumed office April 28, 2025
- Preceded by: Marty Morantz
- In office October 19, 2015 – September 11, 2019
- Preceded by: Steven Fletcher
- Succeeded by: Marty Morantz

Personal details
- Born: Douglas Eyolfson; January 1, 1963 (age 63) Winnipeg, Manitoba, Canada
- Party: Liberal
- Spouse: Sowmya Dakshinamurti
- Education: University of Manitoba (BSc, MD)
- Profession: Physician; politician
- Website: deyolfson.liberal.ca

Douglas Eyolfson (born January 1, 1963) is a Canadian physician and politician. A member of the Liberal Party of Canada, he was first elected to the House of Commons in the 2015 Canadian federal election, serving as the member of Parliament (MP) for Winnipeg West.

In the 2019 Canadian federal election, Eyolfson was defeated by Conservative candidate Marty Morantz. After two close election losses to try and win back his seat, Eyolfson defeated Morantz in the 2025 Canadian federal election and returned to Parliament. He was a member of the Standing Committee on Health, the Standing Committee on Veteran Affairs and the Subcommittee on Sports-Related Concussions in Canada. He was also the chair of the Manitoba Liberal Caucus.

== Early life ==
Eyolfson was born and raised in Winnipeg, and studied medicine at the University of Manitoba. He worked for 20 years as an emergency department physician in Winnipeg. During his medical career he was a Flight Physician with Manitoba Air Ambulance, medical director of Manitoba's Land Ambulance Program and medical director of the Province of Manitoba's EMS Medical Dispatch Centre.

On February 9, 2013, he attracted notice for saving the life of a man who went into cardiac arrest on a transit bus that Eyolfson happened to be riding on at the time.

== Political career ==
Eyolfson was acclaimed as the Liberal Party's nominee in Charleswood—St. James—Assiniboia—Headingley on March 30, 2015, and took a leave of absence from his medical practice during the campaign. He stated that his reason for running for Parliament stemmed from his experience as an emergency physician where he saw the daily impacts of poverty, homelessness, substance abuse, and crime. Eyolfson won the election, unseating Conservative incumbent and former cabinet minister Steven Fletcher by over 6,000 votes in a huge upset.

Eyolfson introduced his first private member's bill, C-373, an act respecting a federal framework on distracted driving in October 2017. Eyolfson's private member's bill would have the federal justice and transport ministers work with the provinces to create a framework aimed at deterring and preventing distracted driving. Eyolfson stated the reason he introduced the bill was due to his experiences as an emergency department physician where he treated multiple victims of distracted driving. The bill was defeated at Second Reading March 21, 2018.

In October 2017, Eyolfson sponsored S-228, the Child Health Protection Act in the House of Commons. The bill seeks to amend the Food and Drugs Act in an effort to fight childhood obesity by prohibiting the marketing of unhealthy food and beverages towards children. Eyolfson stated his previous experience as a doctor and his desire to take steps towards reducing childhood obesity and the risk of premature onset of chronic conditions such as Type 2 diabetes and heart disease as his reasoning for sponsoring the legislation.

On April 18, 2018, the Standing Committee on Health tabled its report Pharmacare now: prescription medicine coverage for all Canadians. Eyolfson, a member of the health committee, helped draft the committee's report. The committee made 18 recommendations it said could form a blueprint for a new single-payer, publicly funded prescription drug program for all Canadians. Eyolfson told the Winnipeg Free Press that a national pharmacare program would mean "the ability to bulk-buy [pharmaceuticals] would save billions of dollars a year," and could introduce provinces to newer, cheaper medications that are more effective. In his community report, Eyolfson stated, "It's evident a National Pharmacare Plan would both save billions annually and save lives. As a result, I’m calling upon the government to fully implement a National Pharmacare Plan that is universal, comprehensive, evidence-based, and sustainable."

Due to the rising number of incidents related methamphetamine abuse in Manitoba, Eyolfson tabled a motion for the Standing Committee on Health to study the impacts of methamphetamine abuse in Canada in order to develop recommendations on actions that the federal government can take, in partnership with the provinces and territories. The committee unanimously agreed to his study. Regarding the outline of the committee study, Eyolfson said, "the medical evidence says that if you’re dealing with drug problems, the number of things that need to be factored in go so far beyond the actual substance; you look at the root causes,” and that he also hopes the committee's findings will help lead to a federal strategy for dealing with meth that could include funding treatments, issuing recommendations to drug manufacturers, shaping the Liberals’ poverty-reduction strategy and restrictions on key ingredients without compromising its legitimate use.

On June 13, Eyolfson moved a motion at the Standing Committee on Health to initiate a study to address violence faced by healthcare workers. The committee unanimously agreed to his study. In a community report prepared by Eyolfson, he wrote that sixty one per cent of nurses report abuse, harassment or assault on the job over a one-year period which leads many to suffer from the effects of PTSD. And that from 2006 to 2015, there were nearly 17,000 violence-related lost-time claims for health care workers. In 2016, this cost Canada nearly a billion dollars as a result of absenteeism for full-time nurses due to illness or injury. In a statement in the House of Commons, Eyolfson said, “As an emergency room physician for 20 years, I would regularly be exposed to violence, even on two occasions having been assaulted myself… It is evident that there is a need for federal engagement on this issue, which is why I introduced a motion in the health committee to study and develop recommendations on actions that the federal government could take to improve violence prevention in health care.”

On March 1, 2019, Eyolfson tabled a petition in the House of Commons to address violence against health care workers. The petition had 8,743 signatures from every province and territory in Canada. His petition called upon the Minister of Health to develop a pan-Canadian prevention strategy to address growing incidents of violence against health-care workers. Eyolfson hopes that a national prevention strategy would continue to change perceptions that violence in workplace settings was acceptable. Eyolfson stated, "Part of it's a cultural shift. It was always just simply accepted that this was a 'part of the job…It took a long time for society, in general, to say that, 'No, this is not acceptable in the hospital workplace; this is not acceptable in any workplace.’"

In December 2018, the City of Winnipeg, the Province of Manitoba and Government of Canada formed a tri-level task force to address the distribution of illicit drugs and the root causes of the province's meth crisis. Because of his experience in emergency medicine, Eyolfson was brought in to support the task force from a public health perspective.

Eyolfson ran for re-election in Charleswood—St. James—Assiniboia—Headingley in the 2019 federal election. Amid a nationwide drop in Liberal support from the 2015 election, he lost to Conservative challenger Marty Morantz by a margin of 2,417 votes. He challenged Morantz in 2021. After the first count of the ballots on polling day, September 20, in the latter election, Morantz led Eyolfson by 24 votes, which touched off a mandatory recount. Eight days later, Eyolfson conceded after the validated results had widened Morantz's lead to 460 votes, which was approximately 1 per cent of the total vote.

Eyolfson ran in Winnipeg West in the 2025 Canadian federal election and defeated Conservative incumbent Marty Morantz by a margin of 7,606 votes

== Personal life ==
In July 2022, Eyolfson suffered a cardiac arrest while training for a marathon in Vancouver, British Columbia. A passerby who witnessed the incident called 911 and performed CPR on Eyolfson until paramedics arrived. He had a quadruple bypass surgery at St. Paul’s Hospital three days after his cardiac arrest.

== Electoral record ==
2025 Canadian federal election: Winnipeg West
** Preliminary results — Not yet official **
Party	Candidate	Votes	%	±%	Expenditures
Liberal	Doug Eyolfson	30,275	54.42	+15.18	
Conservative	Marty Morantz	22,669	40.75	+0.40	
New Democratic	Avery Selby-Lyons	2,248	4.04	–10.87	
Green	Dennis Bayomi	444	0.80	–1.26	
Total valid votes/expense limit					
Total rejected ballots					
Turnout		55,636	75.86		
Eligible voters		73,515			
Liberal notional gain from Conservative		Swing		+7.39	
Source: Elections Canada

2021 Canadian federal election: Charleswood—St. James—Assiniboia—Headingley
Party	Candidate	Votes	%	±%	Expenditures
Conservative	Marty Morantz	18,111	40.0	-0.7	$97,370.69
Liberal	Doug Eyolfson	17,651	39.0	+3.5	$79,799.09
New Democratic	Madelaine Dwyer	6,974	15.4	+1.2	$0.00
People's	Angela Van Hussen	1,594	3.5	-0.8	$417.99
Green	Vanessa Parks	947	2.1	-2.6	$0.00
Total valid votes/expense limit		45,277	99.4	–	$104,740.13
Total rejected ballots		296	0.6		
Turnout		45,573	69.7		
Eligible voters		65,423			
Conservative hold		Swing		-2.1	
Source: Elections Canada

2019 Canadian federal election: Charleswood—St. James—Assiniboia—Headingley
Party	Candidate	Votes	%	±%	Expenditures
Conservative	Marty Morantz	18,815	40.7	+1.66	$96,689.75
Liberal	Doug Eyolfson	16,398	35.5	-16.52	$75,789.03
New Democratic	Ken St. George	6,556	14.2	+8.17	none listed
Green	Kristin Lauhn-Jensen	2,178	4.7	+1.78	$0.00
People's	Steven Fletcher	1,975	4.3	–	none listed
Christian Heritage	Melissa Penner	166	0.4	–	none listed
Independent	Brian Ho	140	0.3	–	none listed
Total valid votes/expense limit		46,228	100.0		
Total rejected ballots		256			
Turnout		46,484	71.1		
Eligible voters		65,375			
Conservative gain from Liberal		Swing		+9.13	
Source: Elections Canada

2015 Canadian federal election
Party	Candidate	Votes	%	±%	Expenditures
Liberal	Doug Eyolfson	24,531	52.02	+33.63	–
Conservative	Steven Fletcher	18,408	39.04	-18.52	–
New Democratic	Tom Paulley	2,842	6.03	-14.10	–
Green	Kevin Nichols	1,376	2.92	-1.01	–
Total valid votes/Expense limit		47,157	99.59		$197,421.64
Total rejected ballots		195	0.41	–	
Turnout		47,352	74.61	–	
Eligible voters		63,466			
Liberal gain from Conservative		Swing		+26.08	
Source: Elections Canada
