= John Harvard (politician) =

Canadian politician (1938–2016)

The Honourable John Harvard PC OM
- Harvard in 2007

23rd Lieutenant Governor of Manitoba
- In office June 30, 2004 – August 4, 2009
- Monarch: Elizabeth II
- Governors General: Adrienne Clarkson; Michaëlle Jean
- Premier: Gary Doer
- Preceded by: Peter Liba
- Succeeded by: Philip S. Lee

Member of Parliament for Charleswood—St. James—Assiniboia (Winnipeg—St. James; 1988–1997)
- In office November 21, 1988 – May 6, 2004
- Preceded by: George Minaker
- Succeeded by: Steven Fletcher (Charleswood—St. James)

Personal details
- Born: June 4, 1938 Glenboro, Manitoba, Canada
- Died: January 9, 2016 (aged 77) Winnipeg, Manitoba, Canada
- Party: Liberal
- Spouse(s): Lenore Denise Berscheid (div.); Patricia Bovey
- Children: 5
- Profession: Politician; broadcast journalist

John Harvard PC OM (June 4, 1938 – January 9, 2016) was a Canadian journalist and politician. He served as a federal Member of Parliament (MP) from 1988 to 2004, and was appointed the 23rd Lieutenant Governor of Manitoba just before Canada's 2004 federal election.

== Journalism career ==
Harvard was a broadcast journalist from 1957 to 1988. He worked for the Canadian Broadcasting Corporation (CBC) for eighteen years and was for many years the host of a popular call-in show in Winnipeg called Talk Back, on CJOB-AM. Coincidentally, his predecessor as lieutenant-governor, Peter Liba, worked as a journalist for CBC's competitor CanWest.

== Political career ==
Harvard was elected to the House of Commons of Canada in the 1988 election as a Liberal, defeating incumbent Progressive Conservative George Minaker by 18,695 votes to 16,993 in the middle-class suburban riding of Winnipeg—St. James (in the previous election in 1984, the Liberal candidate had finished third). Harvard sat as a backbench member of the parliamentary opposition, led by John Turner and later Jean Chrétien, from 1988 to 1993.

The Liberal Party won the 1993 federal election, and Harvard was easily re-elected in Winnipeg—St. James, defeating his nearest competitor, Reformer Peter Blumenschein, by about 13,000 votes. He was not appointed to Chrétien's cabinet, but was named Parliamentary Secretary to the Minister of Public Works and Government Services in 1996.

Harvard was again re-elected without difficulty in the federal election of 1997, running in the redistributed riding of Charleswood—Assiniboia. He was named parliamentary secretary to the Minister of Agriculture and Agri-Food after the election, serving until 1998.

Harvard faced his most difficult bid for re-election in the 2000 campaign, narrowly defeating Canadian Alliance challenger Cyril McFate by 13,901 votes to 11,569. Progressive Conservative Curtis Moore finished third with 9,991 votes, causing many to regard the riding as winnable for a "united right" in the next election.

Harvard supported Paul Martin for the Liberal Party leadership over a period of several years, and it was perhaps for this reason that Jean Chrétien never appointed him to the Cabinet of Canada. As early as 2000, Harvard publicly suggested that Chrétien should consider resigning as party leader. When Martin became prime minister on December 12, 2003, Harvard was sworn into the Privy Council as parliamentary secretary to the minister of international trade.

=== Lieutenant Governor of Manitoba ===
Harvard resigned his parliamentary seat on May 6, 2004. It is rumoured that this was done at the urging of Winnipeg mayor Glen Murray, who was seeking the Liberal candidacy for a Winnipeg-area riding in the upcoming federal election. It was announced the next day that Harvard would be appointed lieutenant-governor of Manitoba, and he was sworn in on June 30. Murray was unable to retain the seat for the Liberals.

The position of lieutenant-governor is largely ceremonial, and Harvard held very little direct influence over the government of Manitoba. While serving as the LG, as is the tradition, he and his wife Lenore Berscheid resided in Government House (Manitoba) in Winnipeg. She held two Masters degrees and had a career in education and family therapy before her death in 2018.

His fourth child, Sasha Harvard (1979–2013) was completing his Law degree, and lived in Government House with his parents and their cats.

== Later life and death ==
In October 2005, Harvard was awarded an honorary Doctor of Laws degree from the University of Manitoba. In August 2009, after his term ended, he was succeeded by Lieutenant-Governor by Philip S. Lee. Harvard died of cancer aged 77 on January 9, 2016.

== Arms ==
Coat of arms of John Harvard
Notes The arms of John Harvard consist of: Crest The statue Eternal Youth, known as "Golden Boy", by Georges Gardet, Or. Escutcheon Gyronny of twelve Gules and Argent, a roundel counterchanged. Supporters Two sandhill cranes Argent crested Gules beaked and membered Sable. Compartment A rocky mound Argent issuant from a base tapissé of wheat Or. Motto Support the Public Good
