= Steven Fletcher (politician) =

Canadian politician (born 1972)

The Honourable Steven Fletcher PC

Minister of State (Transport)
- In office 18 May 2011 – 14 July 2013
- Prime Minister: Stephen Harper
- Preceded by: Rob Merrifield
- Succeeded by: Position abolished

Minister of State (Democratic Reform)
- In office 30 October 2008 – 18 May 2011
- Prime Minister: Stephen Harper
- Preceded by: Peter Van Loan
- Succeeded by: Tim Uppal

Leader of the Manitoba Party
- In office 11 September 2018 – 22 May 2019
- Preceded by: Gary Marshall
- Succeeded by: David Sutherland
Parliamentary constituencies
Member of the Legislative Assembly of Manitoba for Assiniboia
In office 19 April 2016 – 10 September 2019
Preceded by	Jim Rondeau
Succeeded by	Scott Johnston
Member of Parliament for Charleswood—St. James—Assiniboia (Charleswood—St. James; 2004–2006)
In office 28 June 2004 – 19 October 2015
Preceded by	John Harvard
Succeeded by	Doug Eyolfson

Personal details
- Born: Steven John Fletcher; 17 June 1972 (age 54) Rio de Janeiro, Brazil
- Party: Manitoba Party (2018–2019)
- Other political affiliations: Provincial: Independent (2017–2018); Progressive Conservative (2001–2017); Federal: People's (2019–2019); Conservative (2003–2018); Canadian Alliance (2001–2003)
- Profession: Engineer; manager

Steven John Fletcher PC (born 17 June 1972) is a former Canadian politician. He served in senior roles in the Conservative Party of Canada in opposition and in government, including five years as a federal cabinet minister. After four terms as a member of Parliament, he served a term as a member of the Manitoba Legislative Assembly for one term.

Fletcher served in the House of Commons of Canada from 2004 to 2015, representing the riding of Charleswood—St. James—Assiniboia as a member of the Conservative Party. In 2004, the then leader of the opposition Stephen Harper appointed Fletcher to the shadow cabinet as health critic. After forming government, Fletcher was appointed as Parliamentary secretary to Health in 2006. He was appointed to the cabinet in 2008. He served on numerous cabinet committees. He was the minister for Democratic Reform, and after the 2011 election, was appointed to minister of State (Transport). He was the first quadriplegic and wheelchair user to serve in the House of Commons, as well as in Cabinet. Fletcher was appointed as minister of State (Democratic Reform) on 30 October 2008. After the Conservative Party victory on 2 May 2011, Fletcher was appointed as minister of State (Transport).

Fletcher received the Queen's Golden Jubilee Medal on 17 December 2002, for his contributions to society and advocacy work. He received the Queen's Diamond Jubilee Medal in 2012.

Fletcher was the leader of the Manitoba Party and an MLA in the Manitoba Legislative Assembly.

In an effort to increase the number of women in cabinet, Fletcher was left out of cabinet in the 15 July 2013 cabinet shuffle by Prime Minister Stephen Harper. Although not officially in the cabinet, he continued to sit on the treasury board cabinet committee. Fletcher was defeated in the federal election of 2015, but was elected six months later to the riding of Assiniboia in Manitoba's 2016 provincial election.

Fletcher resigned his membership in the Federal Conservative party in October 2018, and his party membership in the Provincial Progressive Conservative Party in June of the same year, exactly one year after leaving the Provincial Caucus.

== Early life and accident ==
Fletcher was born in Rio de Janeiro, Brazil, where his Canadian father was working as an engineer. He was raised in Manitoba, and attended Shaftesbury High School in Winnipeg. Fletcher received a degree in Geological Engineering from the University of Manitoba in 1995.

He became a complete quadriplegic on 11 January 1996, after hitting a moose with his vehicle while travelling to a geological engineering job in northern Manitoba. The accident left him completely paralysed below the neck, and he now requires 24-hour-a-day attendant care. He was unable to speak for several months, and only regained this ability after a long process of recovery.

In the immediate aftermath of his accident, Fletcher was told that he would have to spend the rest of his life in an institution. Years later, he joked: "I don't think the doctors ever thought the institution would be Parliament." When asked about his disability during his first campaign for public office, he quipped: "I would rather be paralyzed from the neck down than from the neck up."

Before his accident, Fletcher was a wilderness canoe enthusiast. He served as president of the Manitoba Recreational Canoeing Association, was a two-time former Manitoba Kayak Champion, and competed in national events. He was able to resume his life as an outdoorsman in the mid-2000s through inventions such as the TrailRider, a device which allows quadriplegics to travel over rough terrain. In late 2004, he was able to stand again with the assistance of an hydraulic wheelchair. He has competed in water races, and has won awards using "sip and puff" steering technology. In 2006, he visited the Burgess Shale in the Rocky Mountains with the help of a TrailRider and other hikers.

Fletcher has said that the accident changed his political views. He acknowledges that he "didn't give the less-fortunate any consideration" before 1996, but now describes himself as a "compassionate conservative". More recently, he has expressed his views on the conditions under which Medical aid in dying should be allowed.

== Students' union president ==
Fletcher returned to the University of Manitoba in 1997 to take a Master of Business Administration (MBA) program. He was elected president of the University of Manitoba Students' Union (UMSU) in February 1999, and identified his main priorities as improving the university's public profile and increasing access for students in financial need. He also called for greater university access for disabled students and for higher aboriginal enrollment. In October 1999, he met with federal Finance Minister Paul Martin to lobby for increased student funding.

Fletcher's political views often put him at odds with other campus organizations during much of his tenure, and he was sometimes accused of administrative bias against left-wing groups. In early 2000, he supported a decision by student council to freeze university funding for The Manitoban, a campus newspaper with a left-leaning editorial board. He argued that the issue at stake was one of financial accountability, although his opponents suggested he was trying to infringe on the paper's autonomy. Funding was restored when the newspaper staff agreed to accept an Ombudsman Board.

Fletcher was elected as a director of the Canadian Alliance of Student Associations during his first term. He was re-elected student body president in 2000, and presided over the elimination of the UMSU's debt in May 2000. He credited a partnership with Starbucks for much of the council's $43,000 surplus.

In late 2000, Fletcher announced that he would seek the Progressive Conservative nomination for a provincial by-election in Tuxedo. Some of his opponents later tried to remove him as student president, arguing that such partisan activity was inappropriate for someone elected to represent the interests of all students. Fletcher argued that the university's constitution did not prevent him from participating in provincial politics, and described his opponents as "far left extremists". He lost the provincial nomination to Heather Stefanson. His opponents in the Graduate Students Association later voted to separate from the UMSU, although the University of Manitoba refused to sanction the separation.

Near the end of 2000, Fletcher endorsed a report from the right-wing Fraser Institute which suggested that Canada would have to end university union contracts and professorial tenure to retain bright young academics. He was quoted as saying: "There is merit. You'd have to break the union, I would guess."

During the 2001 student election campaign, Fletcher, with the assistance of Colleen Bready, then UMSU vice-president, and a Security Services officer, performed an unannounced search of several student group offices. The affected groups included the Graduate Students' Association, the Womyn's Centre, Amnesty International, the U of M Recycling Group (UMREG), the Rainbow Pride Mosaic, and the Manitoban. Fletcher and Bready said they had been "made aware of a suspicion" that campaign materials were being stored in the student group offices in violation of UMSU election bylaws. The search was condemned by other campus groups, with UMREG coordinator Rob Altemeyer describing Fletcher's actions as "completely inappropriate". Fletcher defended his actions, saying: "It's UMSU space. We have the authority and the right to check [student organization] space at any time." Bready said they felt warranted since a slate of candidates had already been found guilty earlier in the week of using the Graduate Students' Association office for campaign activities.

In March 2001, Fletcher called for a central co-ordination body to oversee Manitoba's universities, arguing that the province "is too small to have five universities offering the same thing". He opposed the provincial government's 2001 decision to build a new university in northern Manitoba. Fletcher finished his second and final term as student president in May 2001, and received his MBA in 2002.

== Political career ==
=== Party president ===
Fletcher was elected president of the Progressive Conservative Party of Manitoba in November 2001, and was re-elected in 2003. His relationship with party leader Stuart Murray was sometimes fractious. Fletcher criticized Murray in 2002 for hiring discredited advisor Taras Sokolyk without informing him, and suggested that Murray had not taken sufficient action to improve the state of the party's finances.

After Fletcher's election as party president, Manitoba Public Insurance announced that it would no longer provide travel expenses for his personal assistant. A representative for MPI argued that attending party functions was not a prerequisite for Fletcher's stated career goal of becoming an elected politician, and indicated that the fund was not legally required to pay for these activities. Fletcher appealed this decision before the Manitoba Court of Appeal, hiring former New Democratic Party cabinet minister Sidney Green as his attorney. In May 2003, the Court of Appeal ruled that MPI has the discretion to fund such activities under Section 138 of the MPI Act, but is not obliged to use this discretion. He later tried to appeal the decision to the Supreme Court of Canada, but the court twice declined to hear his case. Fletcher filed a lawsuit against former provincial cabinet minister Becky Barrett in September 2003, arguing that she had "maliciously" interfered in his legal battles.

=== Federal politician ===
In late 2003, Fletcher defeated Don Murdock to win the Canadian Alliance nomination in Charleswood—St. James for the 2004 federal election. He later supported the merger of the Canadian Alliance with the more centrist Progressive Conservative Party of Canada, and endorsed Stephen Harper's bid to lead the merged Conservative Party of Canada in early 2004. Fletcher's Alliance nomination was rendered void by the merger, and he was required to contest another nomination for the new party. He defeated Murdock a second time, and was declared the riding's Conservative Party candidate in March 2004.

Fletcher defeated star Liberal candidate Glen Murray, a popular former mayor of Winnipeg, by 734 votes in the 2004 election. His victory was considered an upset, although polls before election day indicated the result would be close. The Liberal Party won a minority government nationally, and Fletcher was named as Senior Health Critic in the Official Opposition.

Fletcher is the first Member of Parliament (MP) in Canadian history with a permanent disability. A running joke during his first campaign was that he would have to be a front bench MP, as the backbenches are not wheelchair-accessible. His election created the need for a "stranger to the House"—a person who is not officially an MP or officer of Parliament—in this case, his aide, to actually be on the floor of the Commons during sessions.

The Parliament buildings had to be adapted to accommodate Fletcher. In Ottawa, Fletcher has advocated for community living, the integration of physically or mentally disabled individuals into society. He has said, "Community living is better for the individual for sure, better for their families, and in most cases—not all—it's better on the taxpayer too."

=== Opposition MP ===
As Conservative Health Critic, Fletcher described himself as a supporter of the Canada Health Act but also indicated a willingness to permit greater private-sector involvement. He suggested that the government is "notorious for stifling innovation", and argued that the private sector should not be "pigeonholed like doctors who tried to pigeonhole me". Liberal Health Minister Ujjal Dosanjh responded by arguing that the Conservative position would jeopardize the principles of the Canada Health Act.

On 20 April 2005, the House of Commons supported Fletcher's motion to compensate all Canadians who were infected with Hepatitis C by the Canadian Red Cross as a result of its failure to test blood samples. This was a major development in a decade-long struggle to have the pre-1986 and post-1990 Hepatitis C victims included in a federal compensation package. A compensation funding package was announced in 2006.

The following month, Fletcher became involved in a controversy unrelated to his parliamentary duties. On 21 May 2005, he apologized for saying "The Japs were bastards" at a veterans' convention in Winnipeg the previous week, in reference to Japanese Imperial Army during World War II. He defended the general intent of his remarks, noting that his grandfather had witnessed the Japanese army commit atrocities when he was taken as a prisoner of war after that fall of Singapore. He also acknowledged that he used "language that was inappropriate".

In November 2005, Fletcher and New Democratic Party MP Pat Martin endorsed a motion to minimize trans-fats in the Canadian food supply. A task force to investigate the issue of trans-fats was subsequently struck, and provided recommendations to the government in 2007.

=== Government MP ===
Fletcher was re-elected with an increased majority in the 2006 federal election, as the Conservatives won a minority government nationally. After the election, he was appointed as parliamentary secretary to the minister of Health and the minister for the Federal Economic Development Initiative for Northern Ontario.

Fletcher supported Sam Katz's bid for re-election as mayor of Winnipeg in 2006. In late 2006, he assisted Liberal MP Andy Scott in presenting a motion for a national strategy on the treatment of persons with autism. He received a 2006 Champion of Mental Health Award.

Fletcher has received awards for community involvement, including a special award from the National Cancer Leadership Forum for advocating a national cancer strategy. He has also received the Courage and Leadership Award from the Canadian Cancer Society, and was inducted into the Terry Fox Hall of Fame on 13 November 2006. Fletcher was given the King Clancy Award, as well as being a recipient of her Majesty's Golden Jubilee Medal for his contributions to Canada.

Fletcher has advocated for embryonic stem cell research using embryos that would otherwise be discarded from in-vitro fertilization techniques. He stated on CBC's The National, "I would ask this question. A Canadian who finds themselves with a terrible ailment or a loved one with a terrible ailment and there is a cure that is derived by embryonic stem cell research, would they deny their loved one or themselves that cure because of the source of the cure? Most Canadians would say please, cure me."

In March 2007, Fletcher began a campaign to have Ottawa's taxi service improve its wheelchair accessibility. Linda McIntosh, a former member of the Legislative Assembly in Manitoba, wrote a book about Fletcher's life entitled What Do You Do If You Don't Die?, released in December 2008.

=== Minister of State (Democratic Reform) ===
After being elected for a third time in the 2008 federal election, Fletcher was appointed as Minister of State for Democratic Reform on 30 October 2008. Fletcher is the first person in history with a permanent disability to be named to the Canadian cabinet. At the time of his appointment, he was quoted saying "I would pinch myself if I could."

Fletcher is only the third federal conservative cabinet minister from a Winnipeg riding. The previous two were Gordon Churchill during the 1950s and the son of Canada's first Prime Minister, Hugh John Macdonald, who served as a cabinet minister in the late 19th century.

On 4 March 2010, Fletcher received the Christopher Reeve Award from the Canadian Paraplegic Association. Teren Clarke, executive director of the Canadian Paraplegic Association said when the announcement was made." Steven Fletcher's journey is an inspiration to all of us since sustaining a high level spinal cord injury only a few years ago. And now as a member of the Federal Cabinet, he deals with matters well beyond the scope of disability issues, and that deserves our recognition with this national/international award."

=== Minister of State (Transport) ===
Fletcher was re-elected in the 2011 General Election, after capturing 58 percent of votes. As Minister of State for Transport, Fletcher's new responsibilities fall within the larger portfolio of the Honourable Denis Lebel, Minister of Transport, Infrastructure and Communities. In addition to continuing to serve on Treasury Board, Minister Fletcher also serves on the Cabinet Committee on Economic Prosperity and Sustainable Growth. "When it comes to Canada's transportation systems, our Government is committed to protecting the safety and security of Canadians", said Fletcher.

As Minister of State, Fletcher is responsible for the Crown Corporations the fall within the Transport portfolio. These include but are not limited to; Canada Post, VIA Rail, Canadian Air Transport Security Authority (CATSA), Ridley Coal Terminals, and half a dozen federally owned bridges. Fletcher also conducted National Round Tables on Infrastructure in the year 2012 to help develop a National Infrastructure Program. In budget 2013 a 70 Billion dollar investment over 10 years into infrastructure was announced by the Minister of Finance Jim Flaherty.

On 16 January 2012, Fletcher announced that he was temporarily stepping down from his position as Minister of State for Transport for an unspecified medical procedure.

Fletcher underwent a 12-hour surgery on 19 January 2012. The doctors removed an old titanium rod and replaced it with a much longer rod, this time secured to the back of his neck, not the front. It stretches from the middle of Fletcher's head to the middle of his back. "If our civilization lasts 1,000 years, my neck will last 1,000 years. It feels better than I can remember", Fletcher said.

On 26 March 2012, Fletcher returned to office and resumed full activities as Minister of State (Transport) and Member of Parliament for Charleswood – St. James – Assiniboia – Headingley.

On 15 July 2013, Fletcher was moved from Cabinet by Prime Minister Stephen Harper in order to make way for more women in a wide-ranging cabinet shuffle that saw several members of the Cabinet replaced. Fletcher stated on Twitter "I am Conservative. I am a traditionalist. I wish I had left Cabinet in the traditional way--- with a sex scandal." Prime Minister Harper kept Fletcher on Treasury Board after the Cabinet Shuffle. Fletcher was the longest serving member on the board.

In March 2014, Fletcher introduced a private member's bill to make physician-assisted death legal under Canadian laws. When the Supreme Court struck down the law prohibiting assisted suicide in February 2015, Fletcher spoke out in support of the court's ruling. The Supreme Court used a substantial portion of Fletchers private members bill word for word in their decision.

During the 2015 election a book titled "Master of My Own Fate" was released, written by Linda McIntosh and Steven Fletcher. The book chronicles the seven years after the end of the first biography "What Do You Do If You Don't Die?" by Linda McIntosh. The book describes events leading up to Fletcher introducing his two private member bills on physician assisted death. It also provides anecdotes on people and events on Parliament Hill including the October 2014 shooting at Parliament Hill and well known Conservatives who are now deceased including former finance minister Jim Flaherty and former senator Doug Finley. The views of other former and current parliamentarians on this issue include Senator Nancy Ruth, Senator Larry Campbell, MP Peter Kent, former MP Svend Robinson and Green Party leader Elizabeth May.

Fletcher was defeated in the 2015 federal election by Liberal Doug Eyolfson as the Conservatives lost all of their seats in Winnipeg.

=== Provincial MLA ===
Six months after his defeat, Fletcher moved to provincial politics when he was elected in the 2016 Manitoba general election as the Progressive Conservative MLA for Assiniboia, which covers much of his former federal riding.

Fletcher was later removed from the PC caucus on 30 June 2017, and would sit as an independent, after publicly breaking with the party on multiple issues, specifically the creation of a new Crown Corporation and the Manitoba government's attempt to introduce a Manitoba only carbon tax.

On 13 August 2018, Fletcher joined the Manitoba Party. He became leader of the Manitoba Party on 11 September 2018.

According to the Winnipeg free press, three reasons lead to Fletchers removal from the PC Manitoba caucus. They are; His introduction of private members legislations, opposing a government bill to create a crown corporation for energy efficiency, and a presentation he gave at a town hall hosted by Manitoba Forward.

Fletcher argued that the PC party did not run on creating a new Crown corporation. That the new crown corporation went far beyond what the government had stated and included items such as potable water. His main argument is that Manitoba has a massive supply of hydro generated power and continues to build more generation at the cost of billions of dollars, with no acceptor to sell the power. Fletcher argues that the demand side management of power usage is not appropriate in the Manitoba context. This is because supply of power will exceed the demand for power until 2044. Combine with the facts that 97% of Manitoba power generation is clean, cheap, green energy, it does not help the environment or hydro fiscal position to reduce the demand of a product that Manitoba has far too much of. In addition, due to the over building undertaken by Manitoba Hydro under the previous government, Hydro has no choice but to raise rates. This in itself with reduce demand. The additional cost of creating a crown will increase rates further due to the huge expense.

Fletcher has introduced many pieces of legislation as an independent member, or as leader of the new Manitoba party.

=== Legislation introduced by Fletcher as an MLA ===
Indigenous Representation Act. This landmark legislation provides a template on how to increase Indigenous representation in the Manitoba Legislature. The legislation is designed to be constitutional within the gift of the Manitoba legislative assembly, and is inspired by current practices in New Zealand.

The Gift of Life Act. This legislation is designed to increase organ donations. It changes the paradigm to assume that everyone is an organ donor for transplant purposes, unless they state otherwise.

The Conflict of Interest Amendment Act. This legislation's purpose is to update the current legislation, which Fletcher describes as "woefully inadequate".

The Electoral Divisions Amendment Act. This legislation would reduce the number of seats in the Manitoba legislature by eight. The current number of sitting MLAs are 57, Fletcher's bill would reduce this to 49 by the next election. He argues that Manitoba is over-governed, that there would be significant cost savings, and that it would increase the competition to be an MLA.

The Manitoba Public Insurance Act. This bill would remove artificial caps that penalize youth and the catastrophically injured, given Manitoba's no-fault system for automobile collisions.

Brookside Cemetery Recognition Act. This legislation will recognize one of the largest Commonwealth cemetery's in the world, and Winnipeg's oldest cemeteries. Many historic figures have been laid to rest here.

The Legal Profession Amendment Act (Queen's Counsel Appointments). This legislation recognizes lawyers who have served society with distinction. It will bring Manitoba in line with other provinces.

Fletcher announced that he would launch a constitutional court challenge against the legislation introduced by the previous government affecting parliamentary privilege.

Fletcher has challenged the Manitoba legislature to become more accessible to Manitobans. In particular, the legislative buildings needed to be updated to meet modern wheelchair accessible laws.

=== Return to federal politics ===
On 22 May 2019, Fletcher announced that he would run again for his former seat in Charleswood—St. James—Assiniboia—Headingley for the party of another former Conservative minister Maxime Bernier with the People's Party of Canada. Fletcher claimed that he and Bernier are "ideological soulmates."

== Electoral record ==
=== Provincial elections ===
2016 Manitoba general election: Assiniboia
Party	Candidate	Votes	%	±%
Progressive Conservative	Steven Fletcher	3,450	43.90	+6.81
New Democratic	Joe McKellep	2,196	27.94	-30.06
Liberal	Ian McCausland	1,631	20.75	+18.54
Green	Ileana Ohlsson	580	7.38	+5.05
Total valid votes		7,857	100.0	
Eligible voters		–		
Source: Elections Manitoba

=== Federal elections ===
2019 Canadian federal election: Charleswood—St. James—Assiniboia—Headingley
Party	Candidate	Votes	%	±%	Expenditures
Conservative	Marty Morantz	18,815	40.7	+1.66	$96,689.75
Liberal	Doug Eyolfson	16,398	35.5	-16.52	$75,789.03
New Democratic	Ken St. George	6,556	14.2	+8.17	none listed
Green	Kristin Lauhn-Jensen	2,178	4.7	+1.78	$0.00
People's	Steven Fletcher	1,975	4.3	–	none listed
Christian Heritage	Melissa Penner	166	0.4	–	none listed
Independent	Brian Ho	140	0.3	–	none listed
Total valid votes/expense limit		46,228	100.0		
Total rejected ballots		256			
Turnout		46,484	71.1		
Eligible voters		65,375			
Conservative gain from Liberal		Swing		+9.13	
Source: Elections Canada

2015 Canadian federal election
Party	Candidate	Votes	%	±%	Expenditures
Liberal	Doug Eyolfson	24,531	52.02	+33.63	–
Conservative	Steven Fletcher	18,408	39.04	-18.52	–
New Democratic	Tom Paulley	2,842	6.03	-14.10	–
Green	Kevin Nichols	1,376	2.92	-1.01	–
Total valid votes/Expense limit		47,157	100.00		$197,421.64
Total rejected ballots		195	0.41	–	
Turnout		47,352	74.61	–	
Eligible voters		63,466			
Source: Elections Canada

2011 Canadian federal election
Party	Candidate	Votes	%	±%
Conservative	Steven Fletcher	23,264	57.6%	
New Democratic	Tom Paulley	8,134	20.1%	
Liberal	Rob Clement	7,433	18.4%	
Green	Denali Enns	1,587	3.9%	
Total valid votes		40,418	100.00%	
Total rejected ballots		135		
Turnout		40,553	64.8%	

2008 Canadian federal election
Party	Candidate	Votes	%	±%
Conservative	Steven Fletcher	21,588	53.8%	
Liberal	Bob Friesen	8,514	21.2%	
New Democratic	Fiona Shiells	7,190	17.9%	
Green	Brian Timlick	2,632	6.6%	
Christian Heritage	Mark Price	180	0.4%	
Total valid votes		40,104	100.00%	
Total rejected ballots		136		
Turnout		40,240	63.4%	

2006 Canadian federal election: Charleswood—St. James—Assiniboia
Party	Candidate	Votes	%	Expenditures
Conservative	Steven Fletcher	20,791	46.98	$71,903.92
Liberal	John Loewen	16,099	36.37	$68,104.46
New Democratic	Dennis Kshyk	5,669	12.81	$1,977.65
Green	Mike Johannson	1,700	3.84	$397.50
Total valid votes		44,259	100.00	
Total rejected ballots		157		
Turnout		44,416	69.93	
Electors on the lists		63,517		
Sources: Official Results, Elections Canada and Financial Returns, Elections Canada.

2004 Canadian federal election: Charleswood—St. James
Party	Candidate	Votes	%	Expenditures
Conservative	Steven Fletcher	18,688	44.29	$70,305.19
Liberal	Glen Murray	17,954	42.55	$71,990.15
New Democratic	Peter Carney	4,283	10.15	$6,030.25
Green	Andrew Basham	880	2.09	$1,061.82
Marijuana	Dan Zupansky	337	0.80	$0.00
Communist	Beatriz Alas	49	0.12	$654.58
Total valid votes		42,191	100.00	
Total rejected ballots		109		
Turnout		42,300	65.45	
Electors on the lists		64,627		
Percentage change figures are factored for redistribution. Conservative Party percentages are contrasted with the combined Canadian Alliance and Progressive Conservative percentages from 2000.
Sources: Official Results, Elections Canada and Financial Returns, Elections Canada.

All electoral information is taken from Elections Canada. Italicized expenditures refer to submitted totals, and are presented when the final reviewed totals are not available.

== Footnotes ==
28th Canadian Ministry (2006–2015) – Cabinet of Stephen Harper
Cabinet post (1)
Predecessor	Office	Successor
Peter Van Loan	Minister for Democratic Reform; 2008–2011	Tim Uppal
